= List of airports by ICAO code: LA-LJ =

List of airports by ICAO code: A - B - C - D - EB-EG - EH-EY - FA-FM - FN-FZ - G - H - ~~I~~ - J - KA-KH - KI-KP - KR-KZ - LA-LJ - LK-LZ - M - N - O - P - Q - R - SA-SC - SD-SH - SI - SJ - SK-SM - SN-SP - SQ - SS-SU - SV-SY - T - U - V - W - ~~X~~ - Y - Z

== LA – Albania ==
Also see airport category and list.

ICAO	IATA	Airport name	Community	Coordinates
LAFK		Farkë Heliport	Tirana	41°18′56″N 019°53′08″E
LAGJ		Gjadër Aerodrome	Gjadër	41°53′43″N 019°35′55″E
LAGK		Gjirokastër Airfield	Gjirokastër	40°05′14″N 020°09′11″E
LAKO		Korçë Airfield	Korçë	40°38′45″N 020°44′29″E
LAKU	KFZ	Kukës International Airport Zayed	Kukës	42°02′01″N 020°24′57″E
LAKV		Kuçovë Aerodrome	Kuçovë	40°46′19″N 019°54′07″E
LASK		Shkodër Airfield	Shkodër (Shkodra)	42°05′22″N 019°30′33″E
LASR		Sarandë Airfield	Sarandë	39°52′43″N 020°02′09″E
LATI	TIA	Tirana International Airport Nënë Tereza	Tirana	41°24′53″N 019°43′14″E
LAVL	VLO	Vlora International Airport	Vlorë	40°36′26″N 019°25′42″E

== LB – Bulgaria ==
Also see airport category and list.

ICAO	IATA	Airport name	Community	Coordinates	Notes
LBAM		Alfa-Metal Airport	Uzunite	42°56′55″N 025°21′32″E	
LBBA		Bahovitsa Airport	Lisets	43°12′22″N 024°39′20″E	
LBBB		Belchinski Bani Airport	Samokov	42°22′29″N 023°23′33″E	
LBBG	BOJ	Burgas Airport (Sarafovo Airport)	Burgas	42°34′10″N 027°30′54″E	
LBBL		Blagoevo Airport	Razgrad	43°27′19″N 026°25′54″E	
LBBO		Bohot Airfield	Bohot	43°18′23″N 024°41′29″E	
LBBQ		Byala Airport	Byala	43°27′49″N 025°42′42″E	
LBBR		Ravnets Air Base (military)	Ravnets, Burgas Province	42°31′37″N 027°16′05″E	
LBBZ		Bazan Airport	Bazan	43°43′42″N 026°07′11″E	
LBDA		Daskal-Atanasovo Airport	Radnevo	42°19′17″N 025°53′37″E	
LBDB		Dolna Banya Airport (private)	Dolna Bania	42°18′31″N 023°49′13″E	
LBDM		Dve Mogili Airport	Dve Mogili	43°36′24″N 025°53′26″E	
LBDR		Draganovtsi Airport	Draganovtsi	42°56′35″N 025°10′10″E	
LBGI		Gorski Izvor Airport	Gorski izvor	42°02′09″N 025°24′30″E	
LBGO	GOZ	Gorna Oryahovitsa Airport	Gorna Oryahovitsa	43°09′05″N 025°42′46″E	
LBGR		Grivitza Airfield	Grivitsa	43°24′00″N 024°46′00″E	
LBHS	HKV	Haskovo Malevo Airport	Haskovo	41°52′18″N 025°36′17″E	
LBHT		Ihtiman Airfield	Ihtiman	42°25′19″N 023°46′02″E	
LBIA	JAM	Bezmer Air Base (military)	Bezmer, Yambol Province	42°27′17″N 026°21′08″E	
LBKJ		Kainardzha Airport	Kainardzha	43°58′12″N 027°28′11″E	
LBKL		Kazanlak Airport	Ovoshtnik, Kazanlak	42°35′41″N 025°25′13″E	
LBLS		Lesnovo Airport (private)	Lesnovo	42°38′04″N 023°38′47″E	
LBMA		Maritsa Airport	Maritsa	42°15′55″N 024°43′14″E	
LBMG		Gabrovnitsa Air Base (military)	Gabrovnitsa (Gabrovnica)	43°32′39″N 023°16′21″E	
LBMO		Montana Airport	Montana	43°22′57″N 023°15′48″E	
LBPD	PDV	Plovdiv Airport	Plovdiv	42°04′04″N 024°51′03″E	
LBPG		Graf Ignatievo Air Base (military)	Graf Ignatievo / Plovdiv	42°17′25″N 024°42′50″E	
LBPL	PVN	Dolna Mitropolia Air Base (military)	Dolna Mitropoliia / Pleven	43°27′05″N 024°30′10″E	
LBPR		Primorsko Airport (private)	Primorsko	42°15′33″N 027°42′11″E	
LBPS		Cheshnigirovo Air Base	Sadovo	42°06′50″N 024°59′29″E	
LBRD		Erden Airfield (private)	Erden	43°29′57″N 023°18′17″E	
LBRS	ROU	Ruse Airport	Rousse	43°41′41″N 026°03′24″E	
LBSA		Slivnitsa Airport	Slivnitsa	42°50′39″N 023°00′51″E	
LBSB		Slanchev Bryag Airport	Sunny Beach	42°43′36″N 027°37′28″E	
LBSD		Dobroslavtsi Air Base (military)	Dobroslavtsi (Dobroslavci)	42°48′44″N 023°17′58″E	
LBSE		Staro Selishte Airport	Isperih	43°39′01″N 026°45′15″E	
LBSF	SOF	Vasil Levski Sofia Airport (Vrazhdebna)	Sofia	42°41′42″N 023°24′22″E	
LBSL		Sliven Airfield (military)	Sliven	42°38′46″N 026°21′33″E	
LBSP		Sapareva Banya Airport	Sapareva Banya	42°18′41″N 023°14′46″E	
LBSS	SLS	Silistra Airfield (military)	Silistra	44°03′18″N 027°10′43″E	
LBST		Stryama Airport	Banya	42°32′16″N 024°49′39″E	
LBSW		Sofia West Airport	Radomir	42°26′36″N 022°59′00″E	
LBSZ	SZR	Stara Zagora Airport	Stara Zagora	42°22′36″N 025°39′18″E	
LBTG	TGV	Bukhovtsi Airfield	Targovishte	43°18′24″N 026°42′00″E	Military
LBTS		Tsalapitsa Airport	Rodopi	42°11′19″N 024°32′09″E	
LBVD	VID	Vidin Airfield (military)	Vidin	44°01′20″N 022°48′58″E	
LBVR		Vratsa Airport	Vratsa	43°15′21″N 023°31′58″E	
LBWB		Balchik Air Base (military)	Balchik	43°25′28″N 028°10′51″E	
LBWC		Chaika Heliport (military)	Varna	43°11′13″N 027°50′53″E	
LBWK		Izgrev Airport	Kalimanci / Varna	43°16′39″N 027°42′09″E	
LBWN	VAR	Varna Airport	Varna	43°13′55″N 027°49′30″E	

== LC – Island of Cyprus ==
Also see airport category and list.

ICAO	IATA	Airport name	Community	Coordinates	Notes
LCEN	ECN	Ercan International Airport	Tymvou	35°09′35″N 033°30′00″E	
LCGK	GEC	Geçitkale Air Base	Lefkoniko	35°14′00″N 033°43′58″E	
LCLK	LCA	Larnaca International Airport	Larnaca	34°52′44″N 033°37′49″E	
LCNC	NIC	Nicosia International Airport	Nicosia	35°09′00″N 033°16′38″E	Abandoned
LCPH	PFO	Paphos International Airport	Paphos	34°43′06″N 032°29′06″E	
LCRA	AKT	RAF Akrotiri	Akrotiri	34°35′25″N 032°59′16″E	
LCRE	KIN	Kingsfield Air Base	Dhekelia	35°00′55″N 033°43′02″E	
LCRO		Lakatamia Air Force Base	Lakatamia	35°06′21″N 033°19′17″E	

== LD – Croatia ==
Also see airport category and list.

ICAO	IATA	Airport name	Community	Coordinates
LDDA		Daruvar Airport	Daruvar	45°35′06″N 017°12′41″E
LDDP		Ploče Airport	Ploče	43°02′19″N 017°25′47″E
LDDU	DBV	Dubrovnik Airport	Dubrovnik	42°33′44″N 018°15′57″E
LDLO	LSZ	Lošinj Airport	Lošinj	44°33′56″N 014°23′53″E
LDOB		Borovo Airport	Borovo	45°23′11″N 018°57′46″E
LDOC		Osijek Čepin Airfield	Čepin	45°32′34″N 018°37′55″E
LDOR		Slavonski Brod Airport	Slavonski Brod	45°09′22″N 017°59′17″E
LDOS	OSI	Osijek Airport	Osijek	45°27′32″N 018°49′24″E
LDOV		Vinkovci Sopot Airport	Rokovci	45°15′04″N 018°45′33″E
LDPL	PUY	Pula Airport	Pula	44°53′34″N 013°55′00″E
LDPM		Medulin Airport	Medulin	44°50′38″N 013°54′16″E
LDPN		Unije Airport	Unije	44°37′42″N 014°14′28″E
LDPV		Vrsar Airport	Vrsar	45°08′30″N 013°37′50″E
LDRG		Grobničko Polje Airfield	Grobnik	45°22′49″N 014°30′29″E
LDRI	RJK	Rijeka Airport	Rijeka	45°13′12″N 014°34′03″E
LDRO		Otočac Airport	Otočac	44°50′44″N 015°17′19″E
LDSB	BWK	Brač Airport	Brač	43°17′09″N 016°40′47″E
LDSH		Hvar Airport	Hvar	43°10′54″N 016°38′00″E
LDSM		Lumbarda Airport	Lumbarda	42°55′43″N 017°10′32″E
LDSP	SPU	Split Airport	Split	43°32′19″N 016°17′55″E
LDSS		Sinj Airport	Sinj	43°42′01″N 016°40′17″E
LDVA		Varaždin Airport	Varaždin	46°17′41″N 016°23′00″E
LDVC		Čakovec Airport	Čakovec	46°23′31″N 016°30′01″E
LDVD		Daruvar Blagorod Airport	Blagorodovac	45°33′34″N 017°01′59″E
LDVK		Koprivnica Airport	Koprivnica	46°12′47″N 016°50′14″E
LDVR		Daruvar Airport	Daruvar	45°35′06″N 017°12′41″E
LDZA	ZAG	Franjo Tuđman Airport	Zagreb	45°44′18″N 016°03′38″E
LDZB		Buševec Velika Airport	Buševec	45°38′51″N 016°07′28″E
LDZD	ZAD	Zadar Airport	Zadar	44°05′40″N 015°21′10″E
LDZE		Zvekovac Airport	Dubrava	45°49′23″N 016°30′00″E
LDZI		Ivanić-Grad Airport	Ivanić-Grad	45°43′12″N 016°20′36″E
LDZJ		Bjelovar Brezovac Airport	Brezovac	45°51′39″N 016°50′09″E
LDZK		Zabok Airport	Zabok	46°00′46″N 015°51′37″E
LDZL		Lučko Airfield	Zagreb	45°46′00″N 015°50′55″E
LDZP		Zvonimir Rain Glider Airfield	Bjelopolje	44°41′59″N 015°46′54″E
LDZS		Sisak Airport	Sisak	45°27′56″N 016°29′11″E
LDZU		Udbina Airport	Udbina	44°33′27″N 015°46′28″E

== LE – Spain (Peninsula and Balearic Islands) ==
Also see airport category and list.

ICAO	IATA	Airport name	Community	Coordinates	Notes
LEAB	ABC	Albacete Airport	Albacete	38°56′54″N 001°51′48″W	
LEAG		Algeciras Heliport	Algeciras	36°07′44″N 005°26′28″W	
LEAL	ALC	Alicante–Elche Miguel Hernández Airport	Alicante	38°16′56″N 000°33′29″W	
LEAM	LEI	Almería Airport	Almería	36°50′38″N 002°22′12″W	
LEAO		Ciudad Real Almagro Heliport	Ciudad Real	38°57′08″N 003°44′28″W	
LEAS	OVD	Asturias Airport	Asturias	43°33′49″N 006°02′05″W	
LEBA	ODB	Córdoba Airport	Córdoba	37°50′36″N 004°50′31″W	
LEBB	BIO	Bilbao Airport	Bilbao	43°18′04″N 002°54′38″W	
LEBG	RGS	Burgos Airport	Burgos	42°21′27″N 003°36′49″W	
LEBL	BCN	Josep Tarradellas Barcelona-El Prat Airport	Barcelona	41°17′49″N 002°04′42″E	
LEBT		Valencia Bétera Heliport	Bétera	39°37′28″N 000°28′21″W	
LEBZ	BJZ	Badajoz Airport	Badajoz	38°53′29″N 006°49′17″W	
LECD		La Cerdanya Aerodrome	Catalonia	42°23′18″N 001°52′00″E	
LECH	CDT	Castellón–Costa Azahar Airport	Castellon	40°12′35″N 000°04′11″E	
LECN		Castellón Aerodrome	Castellón	39°59′56″N 000°01′34″E	
LECO	LCG	A Coruña Airport	A Coruña	43°18′07″N 008°22′38″W	
LECU		Madrid-Cuatro Vientos Airport	Madrid	40°22′14″N 003°47′06″W	
LECV		Madrid Colmenar Viejo Heliport	Colmenar Viejo	40°41′50″N 003°45′48″W	
LEDA	ILD	Lleida–Alguaire Airport	Lleida	41°43′40″N 000°32′09″E	
LEEC		El Copero Military Base Heliport	Dos Hermanas	37°18′47″N 005°59′57″W	
LEEX		La Cartuja Heliport	Seville	37°23′57″N 006°00′38″W	
LEGA		Armilla Air Base	Churriana de la Vega	37°08′00″N 003°38′08″W	
LEGE	GRO	Girona–Costa Brava Airport	Girona	41°54′03″N 002°45′38″E	
LEGR	GRX	Federico García Lorca Granada Airport	Granada	37°11′19″N 003°46′38″W	
LEGT		Getafe Air Base	Madrid	40°17′45″N 003°43′30″W	
LEHC	HSK	Huesca–Pirineos Airport	Huesca	42°04′51″N 000°19′24″W	
LEIB	IBZ	Ibiza Airport	Ibiza, Islas Baleares	38°52′22″N 001°22′33″E	
LEJR	XRY	Jerez Airport	Jerez de la Frontera	36°44′41″N 006°03′36″W	
LEJU		La Juliana Aerodrome	Seville	37°17′42″N 006°09′45″W	
LELC	MJV	Murcia–San Javier Airport	Murcia	37°46′29″N 000°48′44″W	
LELL	QSA	Sabadell Airport	Barcelona	41°31′15″N 002°06′18″E	
LELN	LEN	León Airport	León	42°35′20″N 005°39′20″W	
LEMD	MAD	Adolfo Suárez Madrid-Barajas Airport	Madrid	40°28′20″N 003°33′39″W	
LEMG	AGP	Málaga-Costa del Sol Airport	Málaga	36°40′30″N 004°29′57″W	
LEMH	MAH	Menorca Airport	Menorca, Islas Baleares	39°51′45″N 004°13′07″E	
LEMI	RMU	Región de Murcia International Airport	Valladolises	37°48′09″N 001°07′31″W	
LEMO	OZP	Morón Air Base	Morón de la Frontera	37°10′29″N 005°36′57″W	
LEPA	PMI	Palma de Mallorca Airport	Mallorca, Islas Baleares	39°33′06″N 002°44′20″E	
LEPO		Pollença Seaplane Base	Pollença	39°54′29″N 003°06′07″E	
LEPP	PNA	Pamplona Airport	Pamplona	42°46′12″N 001°38′49″W	
LERE		Requena Aerodrome	Requena / Valencia	39°28′29″N 001°02′04″W	
LERI		Alcantarilla Air Base	Murcia	37°57′04″N 001°13′49″W	
LERJ	RJL	Logroño–Agoncillo Airport	La Rioja	42°27′37″N 002°19′13″W	Shared public and military; helicopter operations use ICAO code LELO
LERL	CQM	Ciudad Real International Airport	Ciudad Real	38°51′23″N 003°58′12″W	
LERS	REU	Reus Airport	Reus / Constanti	41°08′51″N 001°10′02″E	
LERT	ROZ	Naval Station Rota	Cádiz	36°38′43″N 006°20′58″W	
LESA	SLM	Salamanca Airport	Salamanca	40°57′07″N 005°30′07″W	
LESB		Son Bonet Aerodrome	Mallorca, Islas Baleares	39°35′56″N 002°42′10″E	
LESL		San Luis Aerodrome	Menorca, Islas Baleares	39°51′44″N 004°15′30″E	
LESO	EAS	San Sebastián Airport	Gipuzkoa	43°21′23″N 001°47′26″W	
LEST	SCQ	Santiago de Compostela Airport	Santiago de Compostela	42°53′47″N 008°24′55″W	
LESU	LEU	Andorra–La Seu d'Urgell Airport	Montferrer i Castellbò	42°20′29″N 001°24′17″E	
LETA		Servei Generals Del Circuit De Catalunya Heliport	Barcelona	41°34′26″N 002°15′26″E	
LETL	TEV	Teruel Airport	Teruel	40°24′43″N 001°13′03″W	
LETO	TOJ	Madrid–Torrejón Airport	Madrid	40°29′48″N 003°26′45″W	
LEVC	VLC	Valencia Airport	Valencia	39°29′22″N 000°28′54″W	
LEVD	VLL	Valladolid Airport	Valladolid	41°42′22″N 004°51′07″W	
LEVT	VIT	Vitoria Airport	Vitoria-Gasteiz	42°52′58″N 002°43′28″W	
LEVX	VGO	Vigo–Peinador Airport	Vigo, Pontevedra	42°13′45″N 008°37′39″W	
LEXJ	SDR	Santander Airport	Maliaño, Cantabria	43°25′37″N 003°49′12″W	
LEZG	ZAZ	Zaragoza Airport	Zaragoza	41°39′58″N 001°02′30″W	
LEZL	SVQ	Seville Airport (San Pablo Airport)	Seville	37°25′05″N 005°53′56″W	

== LF – Metropolitan France, Saint Pierre and Miquelon ==
Also see airport category and list.

ICAO	IATA	Airport name	Community	Coordinates	Notes
LFAB	DPE	Dieppe – Saint-Aubin Airport	Dieppe	49°53′05″N 001°04′52″E	
LFAC	CQF	Calais–Dunkerque Airport	Calais, Dunkirk	50°57′39″N 001°57′05″E	
LFAD	XCP	Compiègne – Margny Airport	Compiègne	49°25′52″N 002°48′05″E	
LFAE		Eu Mers – Le Tréport Airport	Eu, Le Tréport	50°04′05″N 001°25′29″E	
LFAF	XLN	Laon – Chambry Airport	Laon	49°35′45″N 003°37′54″E	
LFAG		Peronne-St Quentin Airfield	Péronne	49°52′11″N 003°01′43″E	
LFAI		Nangis – Les Loges Aerodrome	Nangis	48°35′46″N 003°00′24″E	
LFAJ		Argentan Airport	Argentan	48°42′34″N 000°00′10″E	
LFAK		Dunkerque – Les Moëres Airfield	Dunkirk	51°02′32″N 002°33′11″E	
LFAL		La Flèche – Thorée Les Pins Airport	La Flèche	47°41′33″N 000°00′08″W	
LFAM		Berck-sur-Mer Airfield	Berck	50°25′23″N 001°35′31″E	
LFAN		Condé-sur-Noireau Airport	Condé-en-Normandie	48°53′30″N 000°30′07″W	Closed
LFAO		Bagnoles-de-l'Orne Airfield	Bagnoles-de-l'Orne	48°32′45″N 000°23′15″W	
LFAP		Rethel – Perthes Airport	Rethel	49°28′51″N 004°21′48″E	
LFAQ		Albert – Picardie Airport	Albert	49°58′12″N 002°41′33″E	
LFAR		Montdidier Airport	Montdidier	49°40′20″N 002°34′04″E	
LFAS		Falaise – Monts d'Eraines Airport	Falaise	48°55′38″N 000°08′41″W	
LFAT	LTQ	Le Touquet – Côte d'Opale Airport	Le Touquet	50°30′53″N 001°37′39″E	
LFAU		Vauville Airport	Vauville	49°37′22″N 001°49′50″W	
LFAV	XVS	Denain Airport	Valenciennes	50°19′32″N 003°27′40″E	
LFAW		Villerupt Airport	Villerupt	49°24′38″N 005°53′21″E	
LFAX		Mortagne-au-Perche Airport	Mortagne-au-Perche	48°32′21″N 000°31′55″E	
LFAY	QAM	Amiens – Glisy Aerodrome	Amiens	49°52′23″N 002°23′13″E	
LFBA	AGF	Agen – La Garenne Aerodrome	Agen	44°10′29″N 000°35′26″E	
LFBC		Cazaux [BA120]	Cazaux	44°31′56″N 001°07′43″W	
LFBD	BOD	Bordeaux–Mérignac Airport	Bordeaux	44°49′42″N 000°42′56″W	
LFBE	EGC	Bergerac Dordogne Périgord Airport	Bergerac	44°49′28″N 000°31′14″E	
LFBF	QYF	Aéroport de Toulouse Francazal	Toulouse	43°32′44″N 001°22′03″E	
LFBG	CNG	Cognac – Châteaubernard Air Base	Cognac	45°39′30″N 000°19′03″W	
LFBH	LRH	La Rochelle – Île de Ré Airport	La Rochelle	46°10′45″N 001°11′43″W	
LFBI	PIS	Poitiers–Biard Airport	Poitiers	46°35′15″N 000°18′24″E	
LFBJ		Saint-Junien Airport	Saint-Junien	45°54′08″N 000°55′06″E	
LFBK	MCU	Montluçon – Guéret Airport	Montluçon	46°13′34″N 002°21′46″E	
LFBL	LIG	Limoges – Bellegarde Airport	Limoges	45°51′39″N 001°10′49″E	
LFBM	XMJ	Mont-de-Marsan Air Base	Mont-de-Marsan	43°54′42″N 000°30′33″W	
LFBN	NIT	Niort – Souche Airport	Niort	46°18′49″N 000°23′40″W	
LFBO	TLS	Toulouse–Blagnac Airport	Toulouse	43°38′06″N 001°22′04″E	
LFBP	PUF	Pau Pyrénées Airport	Pau, Pyrenees	43°22′48″N 000°25′07″W	
LFBR		Muret – Lherm Airport	Muret, Lherm	43°26′59″N 001°15′49″E	
LFBS		Biscarrosse – Parentis Airport	Biscarrosse	44°22′05″N 001°07′56″W	
LFBT	LDE	Tarbes–Lourdes–Pyrénées Airport	Tarbes	43°11′06″N 000°00′07″W	
LFBU	ANG	Angoulême – Cognac International Airport	Angoulême	45°43′44″N 000°13′08″E	
LFBV	BVE	Brive–La Roche Airport	Brive-la-Gaillarde	45°08′59″N 001°28′28″E	
LFBX	PGX	Périgueux Bassillac Airport	Périgueux	45°11′51″N 000°48′55″E	
LFBY	XDA	Dax – Seyresse Airport	Dax	43°41′21″N 001°04′08″W	
LFBZ	BIQ	Biarritz Pays Basque Airport	Biarritz, Bayonne, Anglet	43°28′06″N 001°31′24″W	
LFCA	XCX	Châtellerault – Targé Airport	Châtellerault	46°46′58″N 000°33′02″E	
LFCB		Bagnères-de-Luchon Airport	Bagnères-de-Luchon	42°48′00″N 000°36′00″E	
LFCC	ZAO	Cahors Lalbenque Airport	Cahors	44°21′05″N 001°28′31″E	
LFCD		Andernos-les-Bains Airport	Andernos-les-Bains	44°45′18″N 001°03′54″W	
LFCE	XGT	Guéret – Saint-Laurent Airport	Guéret	46°10′34″N 001°57′14″E	
LFCF		Figeac Livernon Airport	Figeac	44°40′24″N 001°47′21″E	
LFCG		Saint-Girons Antichan Airport	Saint-Girons	43°00′28″N 001°06′11″E	
LFCH	XAC	Arcachon – La Teste-de-Buch Airport	Arcachon	44°35′47″N 001°06′39″W	
LFCI	LBI	Albi – Le Sequestre Airport	Albi	43°54′50″N 002°06′47″E	
LFCJ		Jonzac – Neulles Airport	Jonzac	45°29′03″N 000°25′17″W	
LFCK	DCM	Castres–Mazamet Airport	Castres, Mazamet	43°33′18″N 002°17′26″E	
LFCL		Toulouse – Lasbordes Airport	Toulouse	43°35′16″N 001°29′55″E	
LFCM		Millau-Larzac Airport	Millau	43°59′21″N 003°10′59″E	
LFCN		Nogaro Airport	Nogaro	43°46′11″N 000°01′58″W	
LFCO		Oloron – Herrère Airport	Oloron-Sainte-Marie	43°09′49″N 000°33′41″W	
LFCP		Pons – Avy Airport	Pons	45°34′12″N 000°30′54″W	
LFCQ		Graulhet – Montdragon Airport	Graulhet	43°46′16″N 002°00′39″E	
LFCR	RDZ	Rodez–Aveyron Airport	Rodez	44°24′39″N 002°29′00″E	
LFCS		Bordeaux – Léognan – Saucats Airport	Bordeaux	44°42′01″N 000°35′44″W	
LFCT		Thouars Airport	Thouars	46°57′43″N 000°09′10″W	
LFCU		Ussel – Thalamy Airport	Ussel, Thalamy	45°32′09″N 002°25′28″E	
LFCV		Villefranche-de-Rouergue Airport	Villefranche-de-Rouergue	44°22′10″N 002°01′33″E	
LFCW		Villeneuve-sur-Lot Airport	Villeneuve-sur-Lot	44°23′49″N 000°45′32″E	
LFCX		Castelsarrazin – Moissac Airport	Castelsarrasin	44°05′11″N 001°07′38″E	
LFCY	RYN	Royan – Medis Airport	Royan	45°37′52″N 000°58′32″W	
LFCZ		Mimizan Airport	Mimizan	44°08′45″N 001°09′52″W	
LFDA		Aire-sur-l'Adour Airport	Aire-sur-l'Adour	43°42′34″N 000°14′43″W	
LFDB	XMW	Montauban Airport	Montauban	44°01′33″N 001°22′41″E	
LFDC		Montendre – Marcillac Airport	Montendre	45°16′28″N 000°27′08″W	
LFDE		Egletons Airport	Égletons	45°25′17″N 002°04′08″E	
LFDF		Sainte-Foy-la-Grande Airport	Sainte-Foy-la-Grande	44°51′13″N 000°10′36″E	
LFDG		Gaillac – Lisle-sur-Tarn Airport	Gaillac	43°53′02″N 001°52′32″E	
LFDH		Auch – Lamothe Airport	Auch	43°41′01″N 000°35′59″E	
LFDI	XLR	Libourne – Artigues-de-Lussac Airport	Libourne	44°59′00″N 000°08′18″W	
LFDJ		Pamiers – Les Pujols Airport	Pamiers	43°05′26″N 001°41′45″E	
LFDK		Soulac-sur-Mer Airport	Soulac-sur-Mer	45°29′42″N 001°04′56″W	
LFDL		Loudun Airport	Loudun	47°02′09″N 000°06′02″E	
LFDM		Marmande – Virazeil Airport	Marmande	44°29′57″N 000°12′01″E	
LFDN	RCO	Rochefort – Saint-Agnant Airport	Rochefort	45°53′16″N 000°58′59″W	
LFDO		Bordeaux-Souge Airport	Bordeaux	44°52′12″N 000°28′12″W	Closed
LFDP		Saint-Pierre-d'Oléron Airport	Saint-Pierre-d'Oléron	45°57′33″N 001°18′58″W	
LFDQ		Castelnau-Magnoac Airport	Castelnau-Magnoac	43°16′46″N 000°31′18″E	
LFDR		La Réole – Floudes Airport	La Réole	44°34′05″N 000°03′22″W	
LFDS	XSL	Sarlat – Domme Airport	Sarlat-la-Canéda	44°47′30″N 001°14′49″E	
LFDT		Tarbes – Laloubère Airport	Tarbes	43°12′55″N 000°04′38″E	
LFDU		Lesparre – Saint-Laurent-de-Médoc Airport	Lesparre-Médoc	45°11′52″N 000°52′56″W	
LFDV		Couhé – Vérac Airport	Couhé	46°16′22″N 000°11′26″E	
LFDW		Chauvigny Airport	Chauvigny	46°35′01″N 000°38′33″E	
LFDX		Fumel – Montayral Airport	Fumel	44°27′39″N 001°00′24″E	
LFDY		Bordeaux – Yvrac Airport	Bordeaux	44°52′34″N 000°28′50″W	
LFEA		Belle Île Airport	Belle Île	47°19′31″N 003°12′05″W	
LFEB		Dinan Trelivan Airport	Dinan	48°26′36″N 002°06′11″W	
LFEC	OUI	Ouessant Airport	Ushant	48°27′49″N 005°03′43″W	
LFED		Pontivy Airport	Pontivy	48°03′24″N 002°55′15″W	
LFEF	XAM	Amboise Dierre Airport	Amboise	47°20′23″N 000°56′45″E	
LFEG		Argenton-sur-Creuse Airport	Argenton-sur-Creuse	46°35′47″N 001°36′06″E	
LFEH		Aubigny-sur-Nère Airport	Aubigny-sur-Nère	47°28′48″N 002°23′36″E	
LFEI		Briare Châtillon Airport	Briare	47°36′52″N 002°46′55″E	
LFEJ		Châteauroux Villers Airport	Châteauroux	46°50′27″N 001°37′12″E	
LFEK		Issoudun Le Fay Airport	Issoudun	46°53′17″N 002°02′24″E	
LFEL		Le Blanc Airport	Le Blanc	46°37′15″N 001°05′15″E	
LFEM		Montargis Vimory Airport	Montargis	47°57′38″N 002°41′09″E	
LFEN		Tours Sorigny Airport	Tours	47°15′58″N 000°41′55″E	
LFEO	XSB	Saint-Servan Airport	Saint-Malo	48°36′44″N 001°58′31″W	Closed
LFEP		Pouilly Maconge Airport	Pouilly-en-Auxois	47°13′17″N 004°33′40″E	
LFEQ		Quiberon Airport	Quiberon	47°28′56″N 003°06′00″W	
LFER	XRN	Redon Bains-sur-Oust Airport	Redon	47°41′58″N 002°02′12″W	
LFES		Guiscriff Scaer Airport	Guiscriff	48°03′09″N 003°39′53″W	
LFET		Til-Châtel Airport	Til-Châtel	47°32′47″N 005°12′38″E	
LFEU	XBD	Bar-le-Duc Airport	Bar-le-Duc	48°52′03″N 005°11′06″E	
LFEV		Gray Saint-Adrien Airport	Gray	47°25′54″N 005°37′04″E	
LFEW		Saulieu Liernais Airport	Saulieu	47°14′21″N 004°15′57″E	
LFEX		Nancy Azelot Airport	Nancy	48°35′36″N 006°14′28″E	
LFEY	IDY	Île d'Yeu Aerodrome	Île d'Yeu	46°43′03″N 002°23′33″W	
LFEZ		Nancy Malzeville Airport	Nancy	48°43′28″N 006°12′28″E	
LFFB		Buno Bonnevaux Airport	Buno	48°21′00″N 002°25′28″E	
LFFC		Mantes Cherence Airport	Mantes-la-Jolie	49°04′44″N 001°41′18″E	
LFFD		Saint-André-de-l'Eure Airport	Saint-André-de-l'Eure	48°53′43″N 001°15′05″E	
LFFE		Enghien Moisselles Airfield	Enghien	49°02′44″N 002°21′07″E	
LFFG		La Ferté-Gaucher Airport	La Ferté-Gaucher	48°45′25″N 003°16′41″E	
LFFH		Château-Thierry – Belleau Aerodrome	Château-Thierry	49°04′00″N 003°21′20″E	
LFFI		Ancenis Airport	Ancenis	47°24′29″N 001°10′39″W	
LFFJ		Joinville Mussey Airport	Joinville	48°23′06″N 005°08′36″E	
LFFK		Fontenay-le-Comte Airport	Fontenay-le-Comte	46°26′29″N 000°47′34″W	
LFFL		Bailleau-Armenonville Airport	Bailleau-Armenonville	48°30′57″N 001°38′24″E	
LFFM		Lamotte-Beuvron Airport	Lamotte-Beuvron	47°39′24″N 001°59′21″E	
LFFN		Brienne-le-Château Airfield	Brienne-le-Château	48°25′49″N 004°28′21″E	
LFFP		Pithiviers Airport	Pithiviers	48°09′19″N 002°11′15″E	
LFFQ		La Ferté-Alais Airport	La Ferté-Alais	48°29′55″N 002°20′13″E	
LFFR		Bar-sur-Seine Airport	Bar-sur-Seine	48°03′57″N 004°24′45″E	
LFFT		Neufchâteau Airport	Neufchâteau	48°21′32″N 005°43′11″E	
LFFU		Châteauneuf-sur-Cher Airport	Châteauneuf-sur-Cher	46°52′16″N 002°22′37″E	
LFFV	XVZ	Vierzon Mereau Airport	Vierzon	47°11′39″N 002°03′55″E	
LFFW		Montaigu – Saint-Georges Airport	Montaigu	46°55′55″N 001°19′40″W	
LFFX		Tournus Cruisery Airport	Tournus	46°33′43″N 004°58′32″E	
LFFY		Étrépagny Airport	Étrépagny	49°18′19″N 001°38′16″E	
LFFZ		Sézanne – Saint-Remy Airport	Sézanne	48°42′34″N 003°45′48″E	
LFGA	CMR	Colmar-Houssen Airport	Colmar	48°06′37″N 007°21′33″E	
LFGB		Mulhouse–Habsheim Airport	Mulhouse	47°44′17″N 007°25′56″E	
LFGC		Strasbourg Neuhof Airport	Strasbourg	48°33′12″N 007°46′36″E	
LFGD		Arbois Airport	Arbois	46°55′13″N 005°45′36″E	
LFGE		Avallon Airport	Avallon	47°30′14″N 003°54′04″E	
LFGF	XBV	Beaune Challanges Airport	Beaune	47°00′24″N 004°53′39″E	
LFGG		Belfort Chaux Airport	Belfort	47°42′04″N 006°49′51″E	
LFGH		Cosne-sur-Loire Airport	Cosne-Cours-sur-Loire	47°21′39″N 002°54′57″E	
LFGI		Dijon Darois Airport	Dijon	47°23′07″N 004°56′49″E	
LFGJ	DLE	Dole-Jura Airport	Dole	47°02′34″N 005°26′06″E	
LFGK		Joigny Airport	Joigny	47°59′40″N 003°23′34″E	
LFGL	XLL	Lons-le-Saunier Courlaoux Airport	Lons-le-Saunier	46°40′30″N 005°28′09″E	
LFGM		Montceau-les-Mines Pouilloux Airport	Montceau-les-Mines	46°36′11″N 004°20′17″E	
LFGN		Paray-le-Monial Airport	Paray-le-Monial	46°27′57″N 004°08′04″E	
LFGO		Pont-sur-Yonne Airport	Pont-sur-Yonne	48°17′30″N 003°14′45″E	
LFGP		Saint-Florentin Cheu Airport	Saint-Florentin	47°58′49″N 003°46′32″E	
LFGQ		Semur-en-Auxois Airport	Semur-en-Auxois	47°28′52″N 004°20′35″E	
LFGR		Doncourt-lès-Conflans Airport	Doncourt-lès-Conflans	49°09′06″N 005°55′54″E	
LFGS		Longuyon Villette Airport	Longuyon	49°29′01″N 005°34′19″E	
LFGT		Sarrebourg Buhl Airport	Sarrebourg	48°43′01″N 007°04′28″E	
LFGU		Sarreguemines Neunkirch Airport	Sarreguemines	49°07′41″N 007°06′30″E	
LFGV	XTH	Thionville Yutz Airport	Thionville	49°21′17″N 006°12′05″E	
LFGW	XVN	Verdun-Le-Rozelier Airport	Verdun	49°07′20″N 005°28′09″E	
LFGX		Champagnole Crotenay Airport	Champagnole	46°45′47″N 005°49′11″E	
LFGY	XTD	Saint-Dié Remomeix Airport	Saint-Dié	48°15′59″N 007°00′27″E	
LFGZ		Nuits-Saint-Georges Airport	Nuits-Saint-Georges	47°08′31″N 004°58′07″E	
LFHA		Issoire Le Broc Airport	Issoire	45°30′54″N 003°16′03″E	
LFHB		Biscarrosse Latecoere Hydrobase	Biscarrosse	44°21′36″N 001°10′04″W	
LFHC		Pérouges Meximieux Airport	Pérouges	45°52′11″N 005°11′14″E	
LFHD		Pierrelate Airport	Pierrelatte	44°23′51″N 004°43′04″E	
LFHE		Romans Saint-Paul Airport	Romans-sur-Isère	45°03′58″N 005°06′12″E	
LFHF		Ruoms Airport	Ruoms	44°26′41″N 004°19′58″E	
LFHG		Saint-Chamond L'Horme Airport	Saint-Chamond	45°29′31″N 004°32′04″E	
LFHH	XVI	Vienne Reventin Airport	Vienne	45°27′45″N 004°49′41″E	
LFHI		Morestel Airport	Morestel	45°41′13″N 005°27′08″E	
LFHJ		Lyon Corbas Airport	Lyon	45°39′15″N 004°54′49″E	
LFHL		Langogne Lesperon Airport	Langogne	44°42′13″N 003°53′05″E	
LFHM	MVV	Megève Altiport	Megève	45°49′25″N 006°38′57″E	
LFHN	XBF	Bellegarde – Vouvray Airport	Bellegarde	46°07′24″N 005°48′17″E	
LFHO	OBS	Aubenas Ardèche Méridionale Aerodrome	Aubenas	44°32′24″N 004°22′09″E	
LFHP	LPY	Le Puy – Loudes Airport	Le Puy-en-Velay	45°04′47″N 003°45′48″E	
LFHQ		Saint-Flour Coltines Airport	Saint-Flour	45°04′35″N 002°59′37″E	
LFHR		Brioude Beaumont Airport	Brioude	45°19′12″N 003°21′42″E	
LFHS	XBK	Bourg – Ceyzériat Airport	Bourg-en-Bresse	46°12′20″N 005°17′30″E	
LFHT		Ambert Le Poyet Airport	Ambert	45°30′58″N 003°44′43″E	
LFHU	AHZ	Alpe d'Huez Airport	L'Alpe d'Huez	45°05′16″N 006°05′06″E	
LFHV	XVF	Villefranche Tarare Airport	Tarare	45°55′07″N 004°38′06″E	
LFHW		Belleville Villié-Morgon Airport	Belleville, Rhône	46°08′27″N 004°42′50″E	
LFHX		Lapalisse Périgny Airport	Lapalisse	46°15′14″N 003°35′19″E	
LFHY	XMU	Moulins – Montbeugny Airport	Moulins	46°32′04″N 003°25′18″E	
LFHZ	XSN	Sallanches Aerodrome	Sallanches	45°57′00″N 006°38′20″E	
LFIB		Belvès Saint-Pardoux Airport	Belvès	44°46′57″N 000°57′32″E	
LFID		Condom Valence-sur-Baïse Airport	Condom	43°54′37″N 000°23′14″E	
LFIF		Saint-Affrique Belmont Airport	Saint-Affrique	43°49′28″N 002°44′38″E	
LFIG		Cassagnes-Bégonhès Airport	Cassagnes-Bégonhès	44°10′40″N 002°30′54″E	
LFIH		Chalais Airport	Chalais	45°16′05″N 000°01′01″E	
LFIK		Ribérac Saint-Aulaye Airport	Ribérac	45°14′19″N 000°15′53″E	
LFIL		Rion-des-Landes Airport	Rion-des-Landes	43°54′57″N 000°56′57″W	
LFIM		Saint-Gaudens Montrejeau Airport	Saint-Gaudens	43°06′27″N 000°37′09″E	
LFIO	XYT	Toulouse-Montaudran Airport	Toulouse-Montaudran	43°34′08″N 001°28′51″E	
LFIP		Peyresourde Balestas Airport	Peyresourde	42°47′48″N 000°26′11″E	
LFIR		Revel Montgey Airport	Revel	43°28′53″N 001°58′48″E	
LFIS		Saint-Inglevert Airfield	Saint-Inglevert	50°52′57″N 001°44′09″E	
LFIT		Toulouse Bourg-Saint-Bernard Airport	Toulouse	43°36′44″N 001°43′31″E	
LFIV		Vendays-Montalivet Airport	Vendays-Montalivet	45°22′50″N 001°06′57″W	
LFIX		Itxassou Airport	Itxassou	43°20′15″N 001°25′20″W	
LFIY		Saint-Jean-d'Angély Airport	Saint-Jean-d'Angély	45°57′54″N 000°31′24″W	
LFJA		Chaumont Semoutiers Airport	Chaumont	48°04′47″N 005°03′01″E	
LFJB		Mauléon Airport	Mauléon	46°54′10″N 000°41′52″W	
LFJC		Clamecy Airport	Clamecy	47°26′15″N 003°30′27″E	
LFJD		Corlier Aerodrome	Corlier	46°02′23″N 005°29′48″E	
LFJE		La Motte-Chalancon Airport	La Motte-Chalancon	44°29′45″N 005°24′10″E	
LFJF		Aubenasson Airport	Aubenasson	44°41′40″N 005°09′04″E	
LFJH		Cazères Palaminy Airport	Cazères	43°12′08″N 001°03′04″E	
LFJI		Marennes Airport	Marennes	45°49′30″N 001°04′36″W	
LFJL	ETZ	Metz–Nancy–Lorraine Airport	Metz	48°58′42″N 006°14′48″E	
LFJR	ANE	Angers – Loire Airport	Marcé	47°33′37″N 000°18′44″W	
LFJS	XSS	Soissons Courmelles Airport	Soissons	49°20′42″N 003°16′58″E	
LFJT		Tours Le Louroux Airport	Tours	47°08′57″N 000°42′40″E	
LFJU		Lurcy Levis Airport	Lurcy	46°42′44″N 002°56′41″E	
LFJV		Lasclaveries Aerodrome	Lasclaveries	43°25′31″N 000°17′13″W	
LFJY		Chambley-Bussières Air Base	Chambley-Bussières	49°01′32″N 005°52′34″E	
LFKA	XAV	Albertville Aerodrome	Albertville	45°37′39″N 006°19′47″E	
LFKB	BIA	Bastia – Poretta Airport	Bastia	42°33′00″N 009°29′05″E	
LFKC	CLY	Calvi – Sainte-Catherine Airport	Calvi	42°31′30″N 008°47′24″E	
LFKD		Sollières-Sardières Airport	Sollières-Sardières	45°15′14″N 006°48′04″E	
LFKE		Saint-Jean-en-Royans Airport	Saint-Jean-en-Royans	45°01′40″N 005°18′36″E	
LFKF	FSC	Figari–Sud Corse Airport	Figari	41°30′08″N 009°05′48″E	
LFKG		Ghisonaccia Alzitone Airport	Ghisonaccia	42°03′18″N 009°24′07″E	
LFKH		Saint-Jean-d'Avelanne Airport	Saint-Jean-d'Avelanne	45°31′00″N 005°40′50″E	
LFKJ	AJA	Ajaccio Napoleon Bonaparte Airport	Ajaccio	41°55′26″N 008°48′09″E	
LFKL		Lyon Brindas Airport	Lyon	45°42′38″N 004°41′48″E	
LFKM		Saint-Galmier Airport	Saint-Galmier	45°36′26″N 004°18′21″E	
LFKO		Propriano Airport	Propriano	41°39′38″N 008°53′23″E	
LFKP		La Tour-du-Pin Cessieu Airport	La Tour-du-Pin	45°33′18″N 005°23′09″E	
LFKR		Saint-Rémy-de-Maurienne Airport	Saint-Rémy-de-Maurienne	45°22′30″N 006°16′40″E	
LFKS	SOZ	Solenzara Airport	Solenzara	41°55′28″N 009°24′20″E	
LFKT		Corte Airport	Corte	42°17′31″N 009°11′20″E	
LFKX	MFX	Méribel Altiport	Méribel	45°24′27″N 006°34′39″E	
LFKY		Belley Peyrieu Airport	Belley	45°41′39″N 005°41′30″E	
LFKZ	XTC	Saint-Claude Pratz Airport	Saint-Claude	46°23′06″N 005°46′14″E	
LFLA	AUF	Auxerre Branches Airport	Auxerre	47°50′47″N 003°29′48″E	
LFLB	CMF	Chambéry Airport	Chambéry, Aix-les-Bains	45°38′24″N 005°52′52″E	
LFLC	CFE	Clermont-Ferrand Auvergne Airport	Clermont-Ferrand	45°47′09″N 003°09′45″E	
LFLD	BOU	Bourges Airport	Bourges	47°03′39″N 002°22′12″E	
LFLE		Chambéry Aerodrome	Challes-les-Eaux	45°33′38″N 005°58′37″E	
LFLG		Grenoble – Le Versoud Aerodrome	Grenoble	45°13′05″N 005°50′55″E	
LFLH	XCD	Chalon – Champforgeuil Airfield	Chalon-sur-Saône	46°49′34″N 004°49′03″E	
LFLI	QNJ	Annemasse Aerodrome	Annemasse	46°11′32″N 006°16′05″E	
LFLJ	CVF	Courchevel Altiport	Courchevel	45°23′51″N 006°38′04″E	
LFLK		Oyonnax Arbent Airport	Oyonnax	46°16′45″N 005°40′03″E	
LFLL	LYS	Lyon–Saint Exupéry Airport (formerly Satolas Airport)	Lyon	45°43′32″N 005°04′52″E	
LFLM	QNX	Mâcon Charnay Airport	Mâcon	46°17′42″N 004°47′46″E	
LFLN	SYT	Saint-Yan Airport	Saint-Yan	46°24′23″N 004°01′16″E	
LFLO	RNE	Roanne Renaison Airport	Roanne	46°03′14″N 003°59′56″E	
LFLP	NCY	Annecy – Haute-Savoie – Mont Blanc Airport	Meythet	45°55′51″N 006°06′23″E	
LFLQ	XMK	Montélimar Ancone Airport	Montélimar	44°34′48″N 004°44′20″E	
LFLR		Saint-Rambert-d'Albon Airport	Saint-Rambert-d'Albon	45°15′06″N 004°49′35″E	
LFLS	GNB	Alpes–Isère Airport	Saint-Etienne-de-Saint-Geoirs	45°21′47″N 005°19′46″E	
LFLT		Montluçon – Domérat Airport	Montluçon	46°21′10″N 002°34′14″E	
LFLU	VAF	Valence-Chabeuil Airport	Valence	44°54′56″N 004°58′07″E	
LFLV	VHY	Vichy — Charmeil Airport	Vichy	46°10′18″N 003°24′15″E	
LFLW	AUR	Aurillac – Tronquières Airport	Aurillac	44°53′51″N 002°25′00″E	
LFLX	CHR	Châteauroux-Centre "Marcel Dassault" Airport	Châteauroux, Déols	46°51′37″N 001°43′16″E	
LFLY	LYN	Lyon–Bron Airport	Lyon	45°43′46″N 004°56′20″E	
LFLZ		Feurs – Chambéon Airport	Feurs	45°42′22″N 004°11′50″E	
LFMA		Aix-en-Provence Aerodrome	Les Milles/Aix-en-Provence	43°30′19″N 005°22′02″E	
LFMC		Le Luc – Le Cannet Airport	Le Luc	43°23′05″N 006°23′13″E	
LFMD	CEQ	Cannes – Mandelieu Airport	Cannes	43°32′47″N 006°57′15″E	
LFME		Nîmes Courbessac Airport	Nîmes	43°51′14″N 004°24′49″E	
LFMF		Fayence-Tourrettes Airfield	Fayence	43°36′29″N 006°42′06″E	
LFMG		La Montagne Noire Airport	Montagne Noire	43°24′27″N 001°59′25″E	
LFMH	EBU	Saint-Étienne–Bouthéon Airport	Saint-Étienne	45°32′26″N 004°17′47″E	
LFMI	QIE	Istres-Le Tubé Air Base	Istres	43°31′28″N 004°56′30″E	
LFMK	CCF	Carcassonne Airport	Carcassonne	43°12′57″N 002°18′31″E	
LFML	MRS	Marseille Provence Airport	Marseille	43°26′12″N 005°12′54″E	
LFMN	NCE	Nice Côte d'Azur Airport	Nice	43°39′55″N 007°12′54″E	
LFMO	XOG	Orange Caritat Airport	Orange	44°08′24″N 004°52′07″E	
LFMP	PGF	Perpignan–Rivesaltes Airport	Perpignan	42°44′26″N 002°52′14″E	
LFMQ	CTT	Le Castellet Airport	Le Castellet	43°15′09″N 005°47′07″E	
LFMR	BAE	Barcelonnette – Saint-Pons Airport	Barcelonnette	44°23′14″N 006°36′33″E	
LFMS	XAS	Alès Deaux Airport	Alès	44°04′11″N 004°08′32″E	
LFMT	MPL	Montpellier–Méditerranée Airport	Mauguio	43°34′35″N 003°57′47″E	
LFMU	BZR	Béziers Cap d'Agde Airport	Béziers	43°19′24″N 003°21′12″E	
LFMV	AVN	Avignon – Provence Airport	Avignon	43°54′24″N 004°54′07″E	
LFMW		Castelnaudary – Villeneuve Airport	Castelnaudary	43°18′40″N 001°55′12″E	
LFMX		Château-Arnoux-Saint-Auban Airport	Château-Arnoux-Saint-Auban	44°03′31″N 005°59′27″E	
LFMY		Salon-de-Provence Air Base	Salon-de-Provence	43°36′23″N 005°06′33″E	
LFMZ		Lézignan-Corbières Airport	Lézignan-Corbières	43°10′33″N 002°44′03″E	
LFNA	GAT	Gap Tallard Airport	Gap	44°27′14″N 006°02′12″E	
LFNB	MEN	Mende Brenoux Airport	Mende	44°30′08″N 003°31′58″E	
LFNC		Mont-Dauphin – Saint-Crépin Airport	Mont-Dauphin	44°42′06″N 006°36′01″E	
LFND		Pont-Saint-Esprit Airport	Pont-Saint-Esprit	44°16′10″N 004°39′12″E	
LFNE		Salon Eyguières Airport	Salon	43°39′30″N 005°00′49″E	
LFNF		Vinon Airport	Vinon	43°44′16″N 005°47′03″E	
LFNG		Montpellier Candillargues Airport	Montpellier	43°36′37″N 004°04′13″E	
LFNH		Carpentras Airport	Carpentras	44°01′40″N 005°05′03″E	
LFNJ		Aspres-sur-Buëch Airport	Aspres-sur-Buëch	44°31′03″N 005°44′09″E	
LFNL		Saint-Martin-de-Londres Airport	Saint-Martin-de-Londres	43°48′03″N 003°46′57″E	
LFNO		Florac Sainte-Enimie Airport	Florac	44°17′11″N 003°28′00″E	
LFNP		Pézenas Nizas Airport	Pézenas	43°30′17″N 003°24′48″E	Closed
LFNQ	QZE	Mont-Louis La Quillane Airport	Mont-Louis	42°32′37″N 002°07′12″E	
LFNR		Berre La Fare Airport	Berre	43°32′12″N 005°10′39″E	
LFNS		Sisteron Thèze Airport	Sisteron	44°17′11″N 005°55′45″E	
LFNT		Avignon Pujaut Airport	Avignon	43°59′49″N 004°45′20″E	
LFNU		Uzès Airport	Uzès	44°04′56″N 004°23′38″E	
LFNV		Valréas Visan Airport	Valréas	44°20′09″N 004°54′25″E	
LFNW		Puivert Airport	Puivert	42°54′41″N 002°03′22″E	
LFNX		Bédarieux La Tour-sur-Orb Airport	Bédarieux	43°38′27″N 003°08′44″E	
LFNZ		Le Mazet-de-Romanin Airport	Le Mazet	43°46′08″N 004°53′37″E	
LFOA		Avord Air Base	Avord	47°03′12″N 002°37′57″E	
LFOB	BVA	Beauvais–Tillé Airport	Beauvais	49°27′16″N 002°06′46″E	
LFOC		Châteaudun Air Base	Châteaudun	48°03′28″N 001°22′46″E	
LFOD	XSU	Saumur Saint-Florent Airport	Saumur	47°15′24″N 000°06′55″W	
LFOE	EVX	Évreux Fauville Airport	Évreux	49°01′43″N 001°13′11″E	
LFOF	XAN	Alençon Valframbert Airport	Alençon	48°26′48″N 000°06′29″E	
LFOG		Flers Saint-Paul Airport	Flers	48°45′00″N 000°35′38″W	
LFOH	LEH	Le Havre – Octeville Airport	Le Havre	49°32′02″N 000°05′17″E	
LFOI	XAB	Aerodrome Abbeville	Abbeville	50°08′35″N 001°49′57″E	
LFOJ	ORE	Orléans – Bricy Air Base	Orléans	47°59′15″N 001°45′38″E	
LFOK	XCR	Châlons Vatry Airport	Châlons-en-Champagne	48°46′24″N 004°12′22″E	
LFOL		L'Aigle Saint-Michel Airport	L'Aigle	48°45′31″N 000°39′24″E	
LFOM		Lessay Airport	Lessay	49°12′08″N 001°30′29″W	
LFON		Vernouillet Airport	Dreux	48°42′22″N 001°21′42″E	
LFOO	LSO	Les Sables-d'Olonne Talmont Airport	Les Sables-d'Olonne	46°28′37″N 001°43′22″W	
LFOP	URO	Rouen Airport	Rouen	49°23′27″N 001°11′02″E	
LFOQ	XBQ	Blois Le Breuil Airport	Blois	47°40′43″N 001°12′32″E	
LFOR	QTJ	Chartres – Champhol Aerodrome	Chartres	48°27′32″N 001°31′26″E	
LFOS		Saint-Valery Vittefleur Airport	Saint-Valery	49°50′07″N 000°39′19″E	
LFOT	TUF	Tours Val de Loire Airport	Tours	47°25′55″N 000°43′23″E	
LFOU	CET	Cholet Le Pontreau Airport	Cholet	47°04′56″N 000°52′37″W	
LFOV	LVA	Laval Entrammes Airport	Laval	48°01′56″N 000°44′38″W	
LFOW		Saint-Quentin Roupy Airport	Saint-Quentin	49°48′58″N 003°12′21″E	
LFOX		Étampes – Montdésir Airport	Étampes	48°22′55″N 002°04′31″E	
LFOY		Le Havre Saint-Romain Airport	Le Havre	49°32′41″N 000°21′37″E	
LFOZ		Orléans Saint-Denis-de-l'Hotel Airport	Orléans	47°53′51″N 002°09′51″E	
LFPA		Persan-Beaumont Airport	Persan, Beaumont	49°09′54″N 002°18′42″E	
LFPB	LBG	Paris–Le Bourget Airport	Paris	48°57′36″N 002°26′06″E	
LFPC	CSF	Creil Air Base	Creil	49°15′13″N 002°31′09″E	Closed
LFPD	XBX	Bernay–St Martin Airport	Bernay, Eure	49°06′08″N 000°33′57″E	
LFPE		Meaux Esbly Airport	Meaux	48°55′39″N 002°50′00″E	
LFPF		Beynes Thiverval Airport	Beynes	48°50′35″N 001°54′23″E	
LFPG	CDG	Charles de Gaulle Airport (Roissy Airport)	Paris	49°00′35″N 002°32′52″E	
LFPH		Chelles Le Pin Airport	Chelles	48°53′48″N 002°36′22″E	
LFPI		Paris Issy-les-Moulineaux Airport	Paris	48°49′59″N 002°16′23″E	
LFPK		Coulommiers – Voisins Aerodrome	Coulommiers	48°50′15″N 003°00′52″E	
LFPL	XLG	Lognes Emerainville Aerodrome	Lognes	48°49′19″N 002°37′22″E	
LFPM		Melun Villaroche Aerodrome	Melun	48°36′19″N 002°40′15″E	
LFPN	TNF	Toussus-le-Noble Airport	Toussus-le-Noble	48°45′05″N 002°06′22″E	
LFPO	ORY	Orly Airport	Orly (near Paris)	48°43′24″N 002°22′46″E	
LFPP		Le Plessis-Belleville Airport	Le Plessis-Belleville	49°06′32″N 002°44′10″E	
LFPQ		Fontenay Tresigny Airport	Fontenay-Trésigny	48°42′23″N 002°54′10″E	
LFPR		Orange Plan de Dieu Airport	Travaillan	44°10′46″N 004°55′08″E	
LFPT	POX	Pontoise – Cormeilles Aerodrome	Pontoise	49°05′48″N 002°02′27″E	
LFPU		Moret Episy Airport	Moret-sur-Loing	48°20′28″N 002°47′55″E	
LFPV		Vélizy – Villacoublay Air Base	Vélizy-Villacoublay	48°46′23″N 002°11′59″E	
LFPX		Chavenay Villepreux Airport	Chavenay	48°50′32″N 001°58′50″E	
LFPY		Brétigny-sur-Orge Air Base	Brétigny-sur-Orge	48°35′48″N 002°19′59″E	
LFPZ		Saint-Cyr-l'École Airport	Saint-Cyr-l'École	48°48′45″N 002°04′03″E	
LFQA		Reims – Prunay Aerodrome	Reims	49°12′31″N 004°09′24″E	
LFQB	QYR	Troyes – Barberey Airport	Troyes	48°19′18″N 004°01′00″E	
LFQC		Lunéville-Croismare Airport	Lunéville	48°35′36″N 006°32′36″E	
LFQD	QRV	Arras – Roclincourt Airport	Arras	50°19′26″N 002°48′10″E	
LFQE		Base Lieutenant Étienne Mantoux	Étain	49°13′37″N 005°40′20″E	
LFQF		Autun Bellevue Airport	Autun	46°58′02″N 004°15′39″E	
LFQG	NVS	Nevers Fourchambault Airport	Nevers	47°00′10″N 003°06′47″E	
LFQH		Châtillon-sur-Seine Airport	Châtillon-sur-Seine	47°50′38″N 004°34′48″E	
LFQI	XCB	Cambrai Epinoy Airport	Cambrai	50°13′09″N 003°09′08″E	
LFQJ	XME	Maubeuge Elesmes Airport	Maubeuge	50°18′38″N 004°01′59″E	
LFQK		Châlons Écury-sur-Coole Airport	Châlons-en-Champagne	48°54′18″N 004°21′10″E	
LFQL	XLE	Lens Benifontaine Airport	Lens	50°27′59″N 002°49′11″E	
LFQM		Besançon La Veze Airport	Besançon	47°12′19″N 006°04′50″E	
LFQN	XSG	Saint-Omer Wizernes Airport	Saint-Omer	50°43′39″N 002°13′57″E	
LFQO		Lille Marcq-en-Baroeul Airport	Lille	50°41′14″N 003°04′32″E	
LFQP		Quartier La Horie	Phalsbourg	48°45′57″N 007°12′10″E	
LFQQ	LIL	Lille Airport	Lille	50°33′48″N 003°05′13″E	
LFQR		Romilly-sur-Seine Airport	Romilly-sur-Seine	48°30′02″N 003°45′48″E	
LFQS		Vitry-en-Artois Airfield	Vitry-en-Artois	50°20′15″N 002°59′30″E	
LFQT	HZB	Merville Calonne Airport	Merville / Hazebrouck	50°37′00″N 002°38′24″E	
LFQU		Sarre-Union Airport	Sarre-Union	48°57′03″N 007°04′42″E	
LFQV	XCZ	Charleville-Mézières Airport	Charleville-Mézières	49°47′02″N 004°38′49″E	
LFQW	XVO	Vesoul Frotey Airport	Vesoul	47°38′19″N 006°12′16″E	
LFQX		Juvancourt Airport	Juvancourt	48°06′50″N 004°49′10″E	
LFQY		Saverne Steinbourg Airport	Saverne	48°45′12″N 007°25′31″E	
LFQZ		Dieuze Gueblange Airport	Dieuze	48°46′28″N 006°42′51″E	
LFRA	ANE	Angers Avrille Airport	Angers	47°29′52″N 000°34′25″W	Closed 2003
LFRB	BES	Brest Bretagne Airport	Brest	48°26′50″N 004°25′18″W	
LFRC	CER	Cherbourg – Maupertus Airport	Cherbourg-Octeville	49°39′03″N 001°28′31″W	
LFRD	DNR	Dinard–Pleurtuit–Saint-Malo Airport	Dinard	48°35′16″N 002°04′48″W	
LFRE	LBY	La Baule-Escoublac Airport	La Baule-Escoublac	47°17′22″N 002°20′47″W	
LFRF	GFR	Granville-Mont Saint-Michel Aerodrome	Granville	48°52′59″N 001°33′51″W	
LFRG	DOL	Deauville – Normandie Airport	Deauville	49°21′55″N 000°09′15″E	
LFRH	LRT	Lorient South Brittany Airport	Lorient	47°45′38″N 003°26′24″W	
LFRI	EDM	La Roche-sur-Yon Les Ajoncs Airport	La Roche-sur-Yon	46°42′07″N 001°22′43″W	
LFRJ	LDV	Landivisiau Airport	Landivisiau	48°31′49″N 004°09′06″W	
LFRK	CFR	Caen – Carpiquet Airport	Caen	49°10′24″N 000°27′00″W	
LFRL		Lanvéoc-Poulmic Naval Air Base	Lanvéoc	48°16′54″N 004°26′42″W	
LFRM	LME	Le Mans Arnage Airport	Le Mans	47°56′55″N 000°12′06″E	
LFRN	RNS	Rennes–Saint-Jacques Airport	Rennes	48°04′00″N 001°44′00″W	
LFRO	LAI	Lannion – Côte de Granit Airport	Lannion	48°45′15″N 003°28′28″W	
LFRP		Ploermel Loyat Airport	Ploërmel	48°00′10″N 002°22′38″W	
LFRQ	UIP	Quimper–Cornouaille Airport	Quimper	47°58′30″N 004°10′04″W	
LFRS	NTE	Nantes Atlantique Airport	Nantes	47°09′25″N 001°36′28″W	Formerly Aéroport Château Bougon
LFRT	SBK	Saint-Brieuc – Armor Airport	Saint-Brieuc	48°32′15″N 002°51′24″W	
LFRU	MXN	Morlaix – Ploujean Airport	Morlaix	48°36′03″N 003°49′00″W	
LFRV	VNE	Meucon Airport	Vannes	47°43′10″N 002°43′24″W	
LFRW		Avranches Le Val Saint-Pere Airport	Avranches	48°39′44″N 001°24′13″W	
LFRZ	SNR	Saint-Nazaire Montoir Airport	Saint-Nazaire	47°18′38″N 002°09′24″W	
LFSA	QBQ	Besançon Thise Airport	Besançon	47°16′23″N 006°04′58″E	
LFSB	BSL	EuroAirport Basel Mulhouse Freiburg	Mulhouse, France / Basel, Switzerland	47°35′24″N 007°31′45″E	Also has IATA code MLH
LFSC		Quartier Colonel Dio	Meyenheim	47°55′21″N 007°23′59″E	
LFSD	DIJ	Dijon Air Base	Dijon	47°16′26″N 005°05′20″E	
LFSE		Épinal Dogneville Airport	Épinal	48°12′43″N 006°26′57″E	
LFSF	MZM	Metz Frescaty Airport	Metz	49°04′18″N 006°07′54″E	Closed
LFSG	EPL	Épinal – Mirecourt Airport	Épinal	48°19′29″N 006°04′01″E	
LFSH		Haguenau Airport	Haguenau	48°47′42″N 007°48′57″E	
LFSI		Saint-Dizier – Robinson Air Base	Saint-Dizier	48°38′09″N 004°53′57″E	
LFSJ	XSW	Sedan Douzy Airport	Sedan	49°39′35″N 005°02′16″E	
LFSK		Vitry-le-François Vauclerc Airport	Vitry-le-François	48°42′09″N 004°40′59″E	
LFSL	BVE	Brive–Souillac Airport	Brive-la-Gaillarde	45°02′23″N 001°29′08″E	
LFSM	XMF	Montbéliard – Courcelles Aerodrome	Montbéliard	47°29′12″N 006°47′29″E	
LFSN	ENC	Nancy-Essey Airport	Nancy	48°41′32″N 006°13′34″E	
LFSO		Nancy – Ochey Air Base	Ochey	48°34′59″N 005°57′15″E	
LFSP		Pontarlier Airfield	Pontarlier	46°54′30″N 006°19′45″E	
LFSQ	BOR	Belfort Fontaine Airport	Belfort	47°39′20″N 007°00′39″E	
LFSR	RHE	Reims – Champagne Air Base	Reims	49°18′37″N 004°03′03″E	
LFSS		Saint-Sulpice-des-Landes Airport	Saint-Sulpice-des-Landes	47°47′30″N 001°38′37″W	
LFST	SXB	Strasbourg Airport	Strasbourg	48°32′31″N 007°38′04″E	
LFSU		Langres Rolampont Airport	Langres	47°57′53″N 005°17′37″E	
LFSV		Pont-Saint-Vincent Airport	Pont-Saint-Vincent	48°36′00″N 006°03′23″E	
LFSW	XEP	Épernay Plivot Airport	Épernay	49°00′16″N 004°05′07″E	
LFSX		Luxeuil - Saint-Sauveur Air Base	Luxeuil-les-Bains	47°46′59″N 006°21′51″E	
LFSY		Cessey Airport	Cessey	47°36′33″N 004°37′05″E	
LFSZ	VTL	Vittel Champ-de-Courses Airport	Vittel	48°13′26″N 005°56′07″E	
LFTA		La Tranche-sur-Mer Airport	La Tranche-sur-Mer	46°21′49″N 001°25′38″W	
LFTB		Marignane Berre Airport	Marignane	43°26′41″N 005°12′35″E	
LFTF		Cuers Pierrefeu Airport	Cuers	43°14′51″N 006°07′36″E	
LFTH	TLN	Toulon–Hyères Airport (Hyères Le Palyvestre Airport)	Toulon	43°05′50″N 006°08′46″E	
LFTM		Serres La Batie Montsaleon Airport	Serres-la-Batie	44°27′16″N 005°43′37″E	
LFTN		La Grand'Combe Airport	La Grand-Combe	44°14′40″N 004°00′44″E	
LFTP		Puimoisson Airport	Puimoisson	43°52′08″N 006°09′46″E	
LFTQ		Châteaubriant Pouance Airport	Châteaubriant	47°44′22″N 001°11′22″W	
LFTR		Toulon-St. Mandrier Heliport	Saint-Mandrier-sur-Mer	43°04′58″N 005°56′02″E	Closed
LFTU	FRJ	Fréjus Saint-Raphael Airport	Fréjus	43°25′03″N 006°44′08″E	Closed
LFTW	FNI	Nîmes–Alès–Camargue–Cévennes Airport (Garons Airport)	Nîmes	43°45′27″N 004°24′59″E	
LFTZ	LTT	La Môle – Saint-Tropez Airport	La Môle	43°12′23″N 006°28′57″E	
LFVM	MQC	Miquelon Airport	Miquelon	47°05′45″N 056°23′04″W	
LFVP	FSP	Saint-Pierre Airport	Saint-Pierre	46°45′47″N 056°10′27″W	
LFWF		Brest Centre Hospitalier La Cavale Blanche Heliport	Brest	48°24′12″N 004°31′46″W	
LFWM		Colmar Hôpital Pasteur Heliport	Colmar	48°04′26″N 007°20′17″E	
LFXA		Ambérieu-en-Bugey Air Base	Ambérieu-en-Bugey	45°59′14″N 005°19′42″E	
LFXB	XST	Saintes Thenac Airport	Saintes	45°42′07″N 000°38′10″W	
LFXC		Vittel–Auzainvilliers Aerodrome	Auzainvilliers	48°13′43″N 005°50′35″E	
LFXH		Valdahon Air Base	Valdahon	47°10′01″N 006°21′00″E	Closed
LFXI		Saint-Christol Air Base	Saint-Christol	44°03′20″N 005°29′48″E	
LFXM		Mourmelon Airport	Mourmelon	49°06′43″N 004°22′05″E	
LFXN	XNA	Narbonne Airport	Narbonne	43°11′39″N 003°03′06″E	
LFXQ		Coëtquidan Air Base	Beignon	47°56′35″N 002°11′09″W	
LFXR		Rochefort–Soubise Aerodrome	Rochefort	45°55′52″N 000°59′41″W	
LFXU		Les Mureaux Airport	Les Mureaux	48°59′54″N 001°56′34″E	
LFYD		Damblain Airport	Damblain	48°05′11″N 005°39′51″E	Closed
LFYG		Cambrai-Niergnies Airport	Cambrai	50°08′08″N 003°15′53″E	
LFYH		Broyes-lès-Pesmes Airport	Broye-Aubigney-Montseugny	47°20′04″N 005°30′51″E	Closed
LFYK		Marville–Montmédy Aerodrome	Marville	49°27′15″N 005°25′51″E	Closed
LFYL		Lure–Malbouhans Airport	La Neuvelle-lès-Lure	47°42′08″N 006°32′39″E	Closed
LFYM		Marigny–Le Grand Airport	Marigny	48°39′36″N 003°49′59″E	Closed
LFYR		Romorantin Pruniers Airport	Romorantin	47°19′03″N 001°41′28″E	
LFYS		Sainte-Léocadie Airport	Sainte-Léocadie	42°26′50″N 002°00′39″E	
LFYT		Saint-Simon – Clastres Air Base	Clastres	49°45′26″N 003°12′44″E	Closed
LFYV		Yvetot–Baons Le Comte Airport	Yvetot	49°38′18″N 000°43′42″E	

== LG – Greece ==
Also see airport category and list.

ICAO	IATA	Airport name	Community	Coordinates	Notes
LGAD	PYR	Andravida Airport	Andravida	37°55′11″N 021°17′32″E	Military
LGAG	AGQ	Agrinion Airport	Agrinion	38°36′07″N 021°21′00″E	Operations suspended
LGAL	AXD	Alexandroupolis Airport, "Dimokritos" (Democritus)	Alexandroupolis	40°51′21″N 025°57′23″E	
LGAT	ATH	Ellinikon International Airport	Athens	37°53′54″N 023°43′46″E	Closed 2001
LGAV	ATH	Athens International Airport, "Eleftherios Venizelos"	Athens (Athina)	37°56′11″N 023°56′50″E	
LGAX		Alexandria Airport (Greece)	Alexandreia, Greece	40°39′04″N 022°29′19″E	
LGBL	VOL	Nea Anchialos National Airport (Volos Central Greece Airport)	Nea Anchialos/Volos	39°13′10″N 022°47′39″E	
LGEL		Elfesis Airport	Elfesis/Eleusis	38°03′53″N 023°33′20″E	Military
LGEP		Epitalio Airport	Epitalio	37°36′59″N 021°29′59″E	Closed
LGHI	JKH	Chios Island National Airport, "Omiros"	Chios	38°20′35″N 026°08′26″E	
LGHL	PKH	Porto Cheli Airport	Porto Cheli, Argolis	37°17′56″N 023°08′56″E	Closed 2006
LGIK	JIK	Ikaria Island National Airport, "Ikaros" (Icarus)	Ikaria	37°40′58″N 026°20′49″E	
LGIO	IOA	Ioannina International Airport, "King Pyrrhus"	Ioannina	39°41′47″N 020°49′21″E	
LGIR	HER	Heraklion International Airport, "Nikos Kazantzakis"	Heraklion (Iraklion), Crete	35°20′23″N 025°10′49″E	
LGKA	KSO	Kastoria National Airport, "Aristotelis" (Aristotle)	Kastoria	40°26′50″N 021°16′46″E	
LGKC	KIT	Kithira Island National Airport, "Alexandros Aristotelous Onassis"	Kythira (Kithira)	36°16′27″N 023°01′01″E	
LGKF	EFL	Kefalonia International Airport, "Anna Pollatou"	Kefalonia (Kefallinia, Cephallonia)	38°07′12″N 020°30′01″E	
LGKJ	KZS	Kastellorizo Island Public Airport, "Megisti"	Kastellorizo	36°08′30″N 029°34′35″E	
LGKL	KLX	Kalamata International Airport, "Captain Vassilis Constantakopoulos"	Kalamata	37°04′06″N 022°01′32″E	
LGKM		Amigdaleon	Kavala	40°58′24″N 024°20′28″E	Military, closed
LGKN		Kotroni Airport	Marathon	38°08′15″N 023°57′06″E	Military
LGKO	KGS	Kos Island International Airport, "Ippokratis" (Hippocrates)	Kos	36°47′36″N 027°05′30″E	
LGKP	AOK	Karpathos Island National Airport	Karpathos	35°25′14″N 027°08′48″E	
LGKR	CFU	Corfu International Airport, "Ioannis Kapodistrias "	Corfu (Kerkyra, Kerkira)	39°36′07″N 019°54′42″E	
LGKS	KSJ	Kasos Island Public Airport, "Agia Marina"	Kasos (Kassos)	35°25′17″N 026°54′36″E	
LGKV	KVA	Kavala International Airport, "Megas Alexandros" (Alexander the Great)	Kavala	40°54′48″N 024°37′09″E	
LGKY	JKL	Kalymnos Island National Airport, "Pothia"	Kalimnos	36°57′48″N 026°56′26″E	
LGKZ	KZI	Kozani National Airport, "Filippos" (Philip II)	Kozani	40°17′10″N 021°50′27″E	
LGLE	LRS	Leros Municipal Airport, "Dodekanisos"	Leros	37°11′05″N 026°48′01″E	
LGLM	LXS	Lemnos International Airport, "Ifaestos" (Hephaestus)	Lemnos (Limnos)	39°55′01″N 025°14′11″E	
LGLR	LRA	Larissa National Airport, "Thessaly"	Larissa	39°39′00″N 022°27′46″E	Military
LGMG		Megara Airport	Megara	37°58′52″N 023°21′57″E	Military and domestic general aviation only
LGMK	JMK	Mykonos Island National Airport, "Dilos"	Mykonos (Mikonos)	37°26′06″N 025°20′53″E	
LGML	MLO	Milos Island National Airport, "Afroditi" (Aphrodite)	Milos	36°41′49″N 024°28′37″E	
LGMT	MJT	Mytilene International Airport, "Odysseas Elytis"	Mytilene (Mitilini), Lesbos	39°03′24″N 026°35′58″E	
LGNX	JNX	Naxos Island National Airport, "Apollon" (Apollo)	Naxos	37°04′52″N 025°22′05″E	
LGPA	PAS	Paros National Airport, "Panteleou"	Paros	37°01′15″N 025°06′47″E	
LGPL	JTY	Astypalaia Island National Airport, "Panaghia"	Analipsis, Astypalaia	36°34′45″N 026°22′32″E	
LGPZ	PVK	Aktion National Airport (Preveza Airport)	Prevesa/Lefkada	38°55′32″N 020°45′55″E	
LGRD		Rhodes Maritsa Airport	Maritsa, Rhodes	36°23′04″N 028°07′04″E	Military
LGRP	RHO	Rhodes International Airport, "Diagoras"	Rhodes (Rhodos, Rodos)	36°24′20″N 028°05′10″E	
LGRX	GPA	Araxos Airport, "Agamemnon"	Araxos	38°09′04″N 021°25′32″E	
LGSA	CHQ	Chania International Airport, "Ioannis Daskalogiannis"	Chania, Crete	35°31′54″N 024°08′59″E	
LGSD		Sedes Airport	Sedes	40°32′02″N 023°01′27″E	Military
LGSK	JSI	Skiathos International Airport, "Alexandros Papadiamantis"	Skiathos	39°10′39″N 023°30′13″E	
LGSM	SMI	Samos International Airport, "Aristarchos"	Samos	37°41′21″N 026°54′42″E	
LGSO	JSY	Syros Island National Airport, "Dimitrios Vikelas"	Syros (Siros)	37°25′22″N 024°56′59″E	
LGSP	SPJ	Sparti Airport	Sparti, Laconia	36°58′26″N 022°31′34″E	Closed, may be open again by the Municipality of Sparti
LGSR	JTR	Santorini (Thira) National Airport, "Zefiros"	Santorini (Thira)	36°23′57″N 025°28′46″E	
LGST	JSH	Sitia Public Airport	Sitia, "Vitsentzos Kornaros" Crete	35°12′58″N 026°06′05″E	
LGSV		Stefanovikio Airport	Stefanovikeio	39°28′48″N 022°46′02″E	Military
LGSY	SKU	Skyros Island National Airport, "Aegeon"	Skyros (Skiros)	38°58′03″N 024°29′14″E	
LGTG		Tanagra Airport	Tanagra	38°20′23″N 023°33′54″E	Military
LGTL		Kasteli Airport	Kastelli	35°11′27″N 025°19′35″E	Opening in 2027
LGTP		Tripolis Airport	Tripoli	37°31′50″N 022°24′13″E	
LGTS	SKG	Thessaloniki International Airport, "Makedonia"	Thessaloniki	40°31′11″N 022°58′15″E	
LGTT		Tatoi Airport	Tatoi	38°06′31″N 023°47′01″E	Military
LGZA	ZTH	Zakynthos International Airport, "Dionysios Solomos"	Zakynthos (Zakinthos)	37°45′03″N 020°53′03″E	

== LH – Hungary ==
Also see airport category and list.

ICAO	IATA	Airport name	Community	Coordinates	Notes
LHAK		Atkár-Gyöngyöshalász Airport	Atkár	47°43′16″N 019°54′16″E	
LHBA		Plangi Airport	Balkány	47°46′19″N 021°48′54″E	
LHBC		Békés Airport	Békéscsaba	46°41′00″N 021°09′45″E	
LHBD		Börgönd Airport	Székesfehérvár	47°07′25″N 018°29′55″E	
LHBF		Bükfürdő Airport	Bő	47°23′05″N 016°48′10″E	
LHBI		Biharkeresztes Airport	Biharkeresztes	47°08′15″N 021°40′32″E	
LHBK		Balatonkeresztúr Airport	Balatonkeresztúr	46°41′35″N 017°23′52″E	
LHBL		Ballószög Airport	Ballószög	46°51′42″N 019°33′24″E	
LHBP	BUD	Ferenc Liszt International Airport (Franz Liszt International Airport)	Budapest	47°26′22″N 019°15′43″E	
LHBS		Budaörs Airport	Budaörs	47°27′03″N 018°58′50″E	
LHBY		Bőny Airport	Bőny	47°40′02″N 017°47′05″E	
LHCL		Cegléd Airport	Cegléd	47°09′45″N 019°52′39″E	
LHDA		Dáka Airport	Dáka	47°16′18″N 017°24′38″E	
LHDC	DEB	Debrecen International Airport	Debrecen	47°29′20″N 021°36′55″E	
LHDK		Dunakeszi Airport	Dunakeszi	47°36′50″N 019°08′36″E	
LHDV		Dunaújváros Airport	Dunaújváros	46°53′45″N 018°54′50″E	
LHEC		Érsekcsanád Airport	Érsekcsanád	46°14′59″N 018°55′39″E	
LHEM		Esztergom Airport	Esztergom	47°45′25″N 018°43′50″E	
LHER		Eger Airport	Eger	47°54′19″N 020°24′20″E	
LHFC		Bodmér-Felcsút Airport	Felcsút	47°26′41″N 018°33′26″E	
LHFH		Farkashegy Airport	Budakeszi	47°29′10″N 018°54′55″E	
LHFM		Fertőszentmiklós Airfield (Meidl Airport)	Fertőszentmiklós	47°34′58″N 016°50′43″E	
LHGD		Gödöllő Airport	Gödöllő	47°34′18″N 019°20′12″E	
LHGR		Gyúró Airport	Gyúró	47°23′29″N 018°45′25″E	
LHGU		Győrújbarát Airport	Győrújbarát	47°36′19″N 017°39′37″E	
LHGY		Gyöngyös Pipishegy Airport	Gyöngyös	47°48′51″N 019°58′36″E	
LHHH		Hármas-határ-hegy Airfield	Budapest	47°33′05″N 018°58′35″E	
LHHK		Hajmáskér Airport	Hajmáskér	47°08′34″N 017°59′51″E	
LHHO		Hajdúszoboszló Airport	Hajdúszoboszló	47°27′35″N 021°23′27″E	
LHJK		Jakabszállás Airport	Jakabszállás	46°44′52″N 019°36′17″E	
LHJT		Földes Airport	Földes	46°58′07″N 017°50′41″E	
LHKA		Kalocsa Airport	Foktő	46°33′00″N 018°56′25″E	Closed
LHKD		Kecskéd Airport	Kecskéd	47°31′02″N 018°19′30″E	
LHKE		Kecskemét Air Base	Kecskemét	46°55′03″N 019°44′57″E	
LHKH		Kiskunfélegyháza Airport	Kiskunfélegyháza	46°43′59″N 019°53′36″E	
LHKI		Kiskőrös-Akasztó Airport	Akasztó	46°39′24″N 019°14′35″E	
LHKK		Kiskunlacháza Airport	Kiskunlacháza	47°10′28″N 019°04′39″E	
LHKM		Kunmadaras Airport	Kunmadaras	47°23′28″N 020°47′06″E	
LHKT		Kadarkút Airport	Kadarkút	46°14′51″N 017°36′28″E	
LHKU		Hertelendy Airport	Kutas	46°22′23″N 017°25′41″E	
LHKV		Kaposújlak Airport	Kaposújlak	46°23′11″N 017°44′01″E	
LHLI		Szigetköz-Lipót Airport	Darnózseli	47°51′27″N 017°26′54″E	
LHMC	MCQ	Miskolc Airport	Miskolc	48°08′16″N 020°47′24″E	
LHMP		Matkó Airport	Kecskemét	46°48′01″N 019°40′55″E	
LHMR		Maklár Airport	Maklár	47°48′43″N 020°25′20″E	
LHNK		Nagykanizsa Airport	Nagykanizsa	46°25′42″N 016°57′27″E	
LHNY		Nyíregyháza Airport	Nyíregyháza	47°59′02″N 021°41′32″E	
LHOY		Őcsény Airport	Őcsény	46°18′14″N 018°46′09″E	
LHPA		Pápa Air Base	Pápa	47°21′50″N 017°29′50″E	
LHPK		Papkutapuszta Airport	Siófok	46°52′31″N 018°02′21″E	
LHPL		Pilis Airport	Pilis	47°18′13″N 019°31′44″E	
LHPP	PEV	Pécs-Pogány International Airport	Pécs	45°59′20″N 018°14′31″E	
LHPR	QGY	Győr-Pér International Airport	Győr, Pér	47°37′40″N 017°48′23″E	
LHPS		Pusztaszer Airport	Pusztaszer	46°34′37″N 019°59′25″E	
LHPW		Pusztaszer West Airport	Pusztaszer	46°32′48″N 019°57′36″E	
LHSA		Szentkirályszabadja Airport	Szentkirályszabadja	47°04′40″N 017°58′06″E	
LHSI		Sitke Airport	Sitke	47°14′04″N 017°01′38″E	
LHSK		Siófok-Kiliti Airfield	Ságvár	46°51′37″N 018°05′37″E	
LHSM	SOB	Hévíz-Balaton Airport	Sármellék	46°41′11″N 017°09′33″E	
LHSN		Szolnok Air Base	Szolnok	47°07′22″N 020°14′07″E	
LHSS		Szolnok–Szandaszőlős Airport	Szolnok	47°08′34″N 020°11′50″E	
LHST		Szatymaz Airport	Szatymaz	46°19′22″N 020°03′12″E	
LHSU		Surjány Airport	Törökszentmiklós	47°12′00″N 020°28′55″E	
LHSV		Szarvas-Kákahalom Airport	Szarvas	46°48′14″N 020°31′40″E	
LHSY		Szombathely Airfield	Szombathely	47°16′48″N 016°37′35″E	
LHSZ		Szentes Airport	Szentes	46°36′45″N 020°17′00″E	
LHTA	TZR	Taszár Air Base	Taszár	46°23′36″N 017°55′06″E	
LHTL		Tököl Airport	Tököl	47°20′43″N 018°58′51″E	
LHTM		Tápiószentmárton Airport	Tápiószentmárton	47°18′50″N 019°46′26″E	
LHUD		Szeged Airport	Szeged	46°15′03″N 020°05′21″E	
LHUH		Sárszentmihály-Úrhida Airport	Sárszentmihály	47°07′42″N 018°18′47″E	
LHVE		Veresegyház Airport	Veresegyház	47°38′17″N 019°15′18″E	
LHZA		Zalaegerszeg-Andráshida Airport	Zalaegerszeg	46°53′05″N 016°47′20″E	
LHZK		Zalakaros Airport	Zalakaros	46°33′14″N 017°09′04″E	

== LI – Italy and San Marino ==
Also see airport category and list.

ICAO	IATA	Airport name	Community	Coordinates	Notes
LIAA	QIL	Terni Alvaro Leonardi Airport	Terni	42°34′24″N 012°35′04″E	
LIAF		Foligno Airport	Foligno	42°55′58″N 012°42′36″E	
LIAL		Sant'Illuminato Light Airfield	Città di Castello	43°21′18″N 012°13′05″E	
LIAP	QAQ	Preturo Airport	L'Aquila	42°22′47″N 013°18′33″E	
LIAQ		Aquino Airport	Aquino	41°29′31″N 013°43′10″E	
LIAR		Furbara Air Base	Cerveteri	41°59′39″N 012°00′49″E	
LIAT		Pontedera Airport	Pontedera, Pisa	43°39′00″N 010°37′00″E	
LIAU		Capua Airport	Capua	41°06′57″N 014°10′41″E	
LIBA		Amendola Air Force Base	Foggia	41°32′29″N 015°43′05″E	
LIBC	CRV	Crotone Airport (Sant'Anna Airport)	Crotone	38°59′50″N 017°04′49″E	
LIBD	BRI	Bari Karol Wojtyla Airport	Bari	41°08′20″N 016°45′38″E	
LIBF	FOG	Foggia "Gino Lisa" Airport	Foggia	41°25′58″N 015°32′06″E	
LIBG	TAR	Taranto-Grottaglie "Marcello Arlotta" Airport	Taranto	40°31′03″N 017°24′11″E	
LIBN	LCC	Galatina Air Base (military)	Lecce	40°14′21″N 018°07′59″E	
LIBP	PSR	Abruzzo Airport	Pescara	42°26′14″N 014°11′14″E	
LIBR	BDS	Brindisi Airport	Brindisi	40°39′27″N 017°56′49″E	
LIBV		Gioia del Colle Air Base	Gioia del Colle, Bari	40°45′51″N 016°56′00″E	
LIBX		Martina Franca Air Force Base	Martina Franca, Taranto	40°42′00″N 017°19′59″E	
LICA	SUF	Lamezia Terme International Airport	Lamezia Terme, Catanzaro	38°54′19″N 016°14′32″E	
LICB	CIY	Comiso Airport	Comiso, Ragusa	36°59′30″N 014°36′25″E	
LICC	CTA	Catania-Fontanarossa Airport (Vincenzo Bellini Airport)	Catania	37°28′00″N 015°03′50″E	
LICD	LMP	Lampedusa Airport	Lampedusa, Agrigento	35°29′52″N 012°37′05″E	
LICG	PNL	Pantelleria Airport	Pantelleria, Trapani	36°48′59″N 011°58′07″E	
LICJ	PMO	Falcone Borsellino Airport/Palermo Airport (formerly Punta Raisi Airport)	Palermo / Cinisi	38°10′55″N 013°05′58″E	
LICK		Scalea Airport	Scalea	39°46′34″N 015°48′41″E	
LICN		Calatabiano Airport	Calatabiano	37°47′58″N 015°13′40″E	
LICP		Palermo-Boccadifalco Airport (Giuseppe and Francesco Notarbartolo Airport)	Palermo	38°07′06″N 013°18′47″E	
LICR	REG	Reggio di Calabria "Tito Minniti" Airport (Aeroporto dello Stretto)	Reggio Calabria	38°04′19″N 015°39′13″E	
LICS		AvioSciacca Airport	Sciacca	37°31′44″N 013°00′11″E	
LICT	TPS	Trapani-Birgi Airport (Vincenzo Florio Airport)	Trapani	37°54′43″N 012°29′36″E	
LICZ	NSY	Naval Air Station Sigonella	Lentini, Syracuse	37°24′06″N 014°55′20″E	
LIDA		Asiago Airport	Asiago, Vicenza	45°53′13″N 011°31′00″E	
LIDB	BLX	Belluno Airport	Belluno	46°10′00″N 012°14′53″E	
LIDC		Cà Negra Airport	Cavarzere	45°05′10″N 012°09′41″E	
LIDE	QIE	Reggio Emilia Airport	Reggio Emilia	44°41′56″N 010°39′45″E	
LIDF		Fano Airfield	Fano, Pesaro & Urbino	43°49′26″N 013°01′32″E	
LIDG		Lugo di Romagna Airfield	Lugo di Romagna, Ravenna	44°23′54″N 011°51′19″E	
LIDH		Thiene Airfield	Thiene	45°40′40″N 011°29′47″E	
LIDK		Francesco Baracca Air Base	Casarsa della Delizia	45°57′12″N 012°49′03″E	
LIDL		Legnago Airport	Legnago	45°07′48″N 011°17′36″E	
LIDP		Pavullo nel Frignano Airport	Pavullo nel Frignano	44°19′20″N 010°49′54″E	
LIDR	RAN	Ravenna Airport	Ravenna	44°21′52″N 012°13′32″E	
LIDT	QIT	Trento-Mattarello Airport (G. Caproni Airport)	Trento	46°01′24″N 011°07′30″E	
LIDU		Carpi Budrione Airport	Carpi	44°50′04″N 010°52′19″E	
LIDV		Prati Vecchi d'Aguscello Airport	Ferrara	44°47′24″N 011°40′22″E	
LIDW		Luciano Narder Light Airfield	Salgareda	45°41′57″N 012°32′35″E	
LIEA	AHO	Alghero - Riviera del Corallo Airport (Alghero-Fertilia Airport)	Alghero	40°37′52″N 008°17′19″E	
LIED	DCI	Decimomannu Air Base	Decimomannu, Cagliari	39°21′15″N 008°58′20″E	
LIEE	CAG	Cagliari Elmas Airport ("Mario Marmelli")	Cagliari	39°15′05″N 009°03′15″E	
LIEO	OLB	Olbia Costa Smeralda Airport	Olbia	40°53′09″N 009°31′01″E	
LIEP		Aliquirra Light Airfield	Perdasdefogu	39°40′42″N 009°27′44″E	
LIER	FNU	Oristano-Fenosu Airport	Oristano	39°53′43″N 008°38′33″E	
LIET	TTB	Tortolì Airport	Tortolì	39°55′09″N 009°40′57″E	
LIGT		San Genesio Light Airfield	Jenesien	46°34′22″N 011°18′27″E	
LIKD		Torraccia airfield	Torraccia (San Marino)	43°57′01″N 012°30′39″E	
LIKO		Ozzano – Guglielmo Zamboni Light Airfield	Ozzano dell'Emilia	44°28′23″N 011°32′29″E	
LILA		Alessandria Airport	Alessandria	44°55′28″N 008°37′32″E	
LILB		Alzate Brianza Airport	Alzate Brianza	45°46′11″N 009°09′44″E	
LILC		Calcinate del Pesce Airport	Varese	45°48′35″N 008°46′05″E	
LILE	QIC	Cerrione Airport	Biella	45°29′43″N 008°06′10″E	
LILG		Vergiate Airport	Vergiate, Varese	45°42′48″N 008°41′57″E	
LILH		Rivanazzano Airport	Voghera, Pavia	44°57′07″N 009°00′59″E	
LILI		Vercelli Carlo Del Priete Airport	Vercelli	45°18′36″N 008°25′02″E	
LILM		Casale Monferrato Airport	Casale Monferrato	45°06′38″N 008°27′23″E	
LILN	QIV	Varese-Venegono Airport	Varese	45°44′29″N 008°53′12″E	
LILO		Caiolo Sondrio Airport	Caiolo	46°09′17″N 009°47′43″E	
LILQ		Massa Cinquale Airport	Massa	43°59′08″N 010°08′35″E	
LILR		Migliaro Airport	Cremona	45°10′02″N 010°00′07″E	
LILV		Valbrembo Airport	Valbrembo	45°43′02″N 009°35′35″E	
LILY		Como Idroscalo (water aerodrome)	Como	45°48′50″N 009°04′12″E	
LIMA	QIA	Aeritalia Airport	Turin (Torino)	45°05′20″N 007°36′20″E	
LIMB	QIB	Bresso Airfield	Milan	45°32′22″N 009°12′08″E	
LIMC	MXP	Malpensa International Airport	Milan	45°37′48″N 008°43′23″E	
LIME	BGY	Orio al Serio International Airport (Milan Bergamo Airport)	Bergamo	45°40′08″N 009°42′01″E	
LIMF	TRN	Turin Airport (Torino Caselle Airport/Sandro Pertini Airport)	Turin (Torino)	45°12′09″N 007°38′58″E	
LIMG	ALL	Riviera Airport (Albenga Airport/C. Panero Airport)	Villanova d'Albenga, Savona	44°02′45″N 008°07′32″E	
LIMJ	GOA	Genoa Cristoforo Colombo Airport ("Christopher Columbus"/Genoa-Sestri Ponente Airport)	Genoa (Genova)	44°24′48″N 008°50′15″E	
LIML	LIN	Linate Airport	Milan	45°26′58″N 009°16′42″E	
LIMN		Cameri Air Force Base	Cameri, Novara	45°31′48″N 008°40′09″E	
LIMP	PMF	Parma Airport (Giuseppe Verdi Airport)	Parma	44°49′20″N 010°17′43″E	
LIMR		Novi Ligure Eugenio Mossi Glider Field	Novi Ligure	44°46′54″N 008°47′18″E	
LIMS		San Damiano Air Force Base	Piacenza	44°54′47″N 009°43′24″E	
LIMW	AOT	Aosta Valley Airport	Aosta	45°44′18″N 007°22′07″E	Formerly Corrado Gex Airport
LIMZ	CUF	Cuneo International Airport (Cuneo Levaldigi Airport)	Cuneo	44°32′49″N 007°37′23″E	
LINB		Corte De' Droso Light Airfield	Melpignano	40°06′25″N 018°15′28″E	
LINF		Fermano Light Airfield	Fermo	43°13′36″N 013°44′36″E	
LINL		Lecce-Lepore Airport	Lecce	40°21′27″N 018°17′38″E	
LION		Dominio di Bagnoli Light Airfield	Bagnoli di Sopra	45°11′02″N 011°51′26″E	
LIPA	AVB	Aviano Air Base	Aviano, Pordenone	46°01′53″N 012°35′49″E	
LIPB	BZO	Bolzano Dolomiti Airport ("Francesco Baracca")	Bolzano, South Tyrol	46°27′37″N 011°19′35″E	
LIPC		Cervia Air Force Base	Cervia, Ravenna	44°13′27″N 012°18′26″E	
LIPD	UDN	Campoformido Airport	Campoformido / Udine	46°01′53″N 013°11′13″E	Military prior to 2008
LIPE	BLQ	Bologna Airport ("Guglielmo Marconi")	Bologna	44°32′08″N 011°17′19″E	
LIPF		Ferrara Airport	Ferrara	44°48′51″N 011°36′49″E	
LIPG		Gorizia Duca d'Aosta Airport	Savogna d'Isonzo	45°54′22″N 013°35′58″E	
LIPH	TSF	Treviso Airport (Sant'Angelo Airport)	Treviso	45°39′03″N 012°11′52″E	
LIPI		Rivolto Air Force Base	Rivolto / Udine	45°58′54″N 013°03′03″E	
LIPK	FRL	Forlì Airport (L. Ridolfi Airport)	Forlì	44°11′42″N 012°04′13″E	
LIPL		Ghedi Air Base (military)	Ghedi, Brescia	45°25′56″N 010°16′04″E	
LIPM		Modena Marzaglia Airport	Modena	44°37′53″N 010°48′31″E	
LIPN	QIO	Boscomantico Airport	Verona	45°28′23″N 010°55′37″E	
LIPO	VBS	Brescia Airport ("Gabriele D'Annunzio"/Montichiari Airport)	Montichiari, Lombardy	45°25′44″N 010°19′50″E	
LIPQ	TRS	Trieste - Friuli Venezia Giulia Airport (Ronchi dei Legionari Airport)	Ronchi dei Legionari / Trieste	45°49′39″N 013°28′20″E	
LIPR	RMI	Federico Fellini International Airport	Rimini	44°01′10″N 012°36′34″E	
LIPS		Istrana Air Force Base	Treviso	45°41′06″N 012°04′59″E	
LIPT	VIC	Vicenza Airport (“Tommaso Dal Molin”)	Vicenza	45°34′24″N 011°31′47″E	
LIPU	QPA	Padua Airport (Gino Allegri Airport)	Padua (Padova)	45°23′45″N 011°50′53″E	
LIPV		Venice-Lido Airport (Giovanni Nicelli Airport)	Venice (Venezia)	45°25′44″N 012°23′16″E	
LIPX	VRN	Verona Villafranca Airport (Valerio Catullo Airport)	Verona	45°23′47″N 010°53′17″E	
LIPY	AOI	Falconara Airbase (Raffaello Sanzio Airport)	Ancona	43°36′58″N 013°21′44″E	
LIPZ	VCE	Venice Marco Polo Airport (Marco Polo International Airport)	Venice (Venezia)	45°30′19″N 012°21′07″E	
LIQB	QZO	Molin Bianco Airport	Arezzo	43°27′04″N 011°50′08″E	
LIQF		Sansepolcro Airport	Sansepolcro	43°33′36″N 012°09′23″E	
LIQG		Cecina Airport	Cecina	43°17′08″N 010°31′16″E	
LIQL	LCV	Tassignano Airport	Lucca	43°49′33″N 010°34′41″E	
LIQN		Rieti Airport (G. Ciuffelli Airport)	Rieti	42°25′36″N 012°51′00″E	
LIQQ		Serristori Airfield	Castiglion Fiorentino	43°19′57″N 011°51′29″E	
LIQS	SAY	Siena-Ampugnano Airport	Siena	43°15′23″N 011°15′18″E	
LIQW		Luni Airport (military/Navy)	Sarzana, Genoa	44°05′20″N 009°59′20″E	
LIRA	CIA	Ciampino-G. B. Pastine International Airport ("Giovan Battista Pastine")	Rome	41°47′58″N 012°35′50″E	
LIRC		Centocelle Air Force Base	Centocelle, Rome	41°52′21″N 012°33′46″E	
LIRE		Pratica di Mare Air Force Base	Pomezia, Rome	41°39′16″N 012°26′42″E	
LIRF	FCO	Fiumicino International Airport ("Leonardo da Vinci")	Rome	41°48′01″N 012°14′20″E	
LIRG		Guidonia Air Force Base	Guidonia Montecelio, Rome	41°59′25″N 012°44′27″E	
LIRH		Frosinone Air Base	Frosinone	41°38′42″N 013°17′56″E	
LIRI	QSR	Salerno Costa d'Amalfi Airport	Salerno	40°37′12″N 014°54′45″E	
LIRJ	EBA	Marina di Campo Airport	Marina di Campo, Elba	42°45′37″N 010°14′22″E	
LIRL	QLT	Latina Airport (military)	Latina	41°32′32″N 012°54′32″E	
LIRM		Grazzanise Air Base (military)	Caserta	41°03′39″N 014°04′55″E	
LIRN	NAP	Naples International Airport (Capodichino Ugo Niutta Airport)	Naples	40°53′04″N 014°17′27″E	
LIRO		Benevento Generale Nicola Collarile Airport	Benevento	41°10′39″N 014°44′50″E	
LIRP	PSA	Pisa International Airport ("Galileo Galilei" Airport)	Pisa	43°41′02″N 010°23′33″E	
LIRQ	FLR	Florence Airport ("Amerigo Vespucci"/Peretola Airport)	Florence (Firenze)	43°48′36″N 011°12′14″E	
LIRS	GRS	Grosseto Air Base	Grosseto	42°45′35″N 011°04′18″E	
LIRU		Rome Urbe Airport	Rome	41°57′07″N 012°29′56″E	
LIRV	VTR	Viterbo Air Force Base / Rome Viterbo Airport	Viterbo	42°26′10″N 012°03′42″E	
LIRZ	PEG	Perugia San Francesco d'Assisi – Umbria International Airport	Perugia	43°05′45″N 012°30′47″E	
LIVD		Toblach Airport	Toblach	46°43′37″N 012°13′50″E	
LIVV		Moncucco-Vische Light Airfield	Vische	45°20′41″N 007°55′09″E	

== LJ – Slovenia ==
Also see airport category and list.

ICAO	IATA	Airport name	Community	Coordinates	Notes
LJAJ		Ajdovščina Airport	Ajdovščina	45°53′19″N 013°53′13″E	
LJBL		Lesce-Bled Airport	Lesce	46°21′30″N 014°10′41″E	
LJBO		Bovec Airport	Bovec	46°19′44″N 013°33′01″E	
LJCE		Cerklje ob Krki Airport	Cerklje ob Krki, Brežice	45°53′59″N 015°30′55″E	Shared military and civilian use
LJCL		Celje Airport	Celje (Levec)	46°14′37″N 015°13′32″E	
LJDI		Divača Airport	Divača	45°40′59″N 014°00′10″E	
LJLJ	LJU	Ljubljana Jože Pučnik Airport (Brnik Airport)	Ljubljana	46°13′28″N 014°27′22″E	
LJMB	MBX	Maribor Edvard Rusjan Airport	Maribor	46°28′47″N 015°41′10″E	
LJMS		Murska Sobota Airport	Murska Sobota (Rakičan)	46°37′46″N 016°10′30″E	
LJNM		Novo Mesto-Prečna Airport	Novo Mesto (Prečna)	45°48′06″N 015°06′16″E	
LJPO		Postojna Airport	Postojna	45°45′08″N 014°11′41″E	
LJPT		Ptuj Airport	Ptuj (Moškanjci)	46°25′07″N 015°59′02″E	
LJPZ	POW	Portorož Airport	Portorož	45°28′24″N 013°36′54″E	
LJSG		Slovenj Gradec Airport	Slovenj Gradec	46°28′19″N 015°07′11″E	
LJSK		Slovenske Konjice Airport	Slovenske Konjice (Senožet)	46°18′40″N 015°19′47″E	
LJSO		Šoštanj Airport	Šoštanj (Lajše)	46°23′53″N 015°02′42″E	
