= Fertőszentmiklós Airfield =

Airport in Hungary

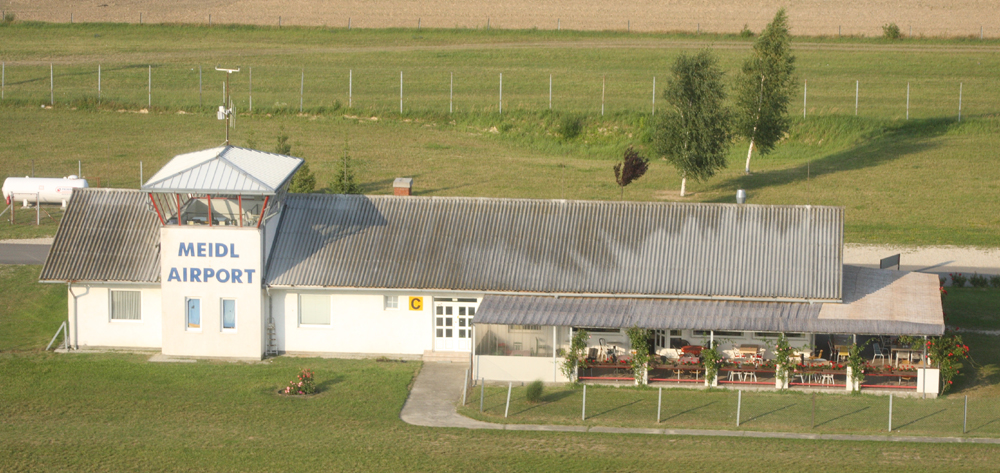
- Main building
- IATA: none; ICAO: LHFM

Summary
- Airport type: Public
- Operator: Meidl Airport Kft
- Serves: Fertőszentmiklós, Hungary
- Elevation AMSL: 440 ft (130 m)
- Coordinates: 47°34′58″N 016°50′43″E
- Website: www.LHFM.hu

Map
- Location of airport in Hungary

Runways
Direction	Length		Surface
Direction	m	ft	Surface
16/34	985	3,232	Asphalt

Fertőszentmiklós Airfield (ICAO: LHFM), also known as Meidl Airport, is an aerodrome located in the countryside southwest of Fertőszentmiklós, a city in Győr-Moson-Sopron county, Hungary. It is near the border with Austria.

== Facilities ==
The airport resides at an elevation of 440 feet (134 m) above mean sea level. It has one runway designated 16/34 with an asphalt surface measuring 985 by 23 metres (3,232 ft × 75 ft).

Only daylight VFR flights with a filed flight plan are allowed. Customs services to allow international flights are available upon request.
