= Šoštanj Airport =

Šoštanj Airport Letališče Šoštanj
- IATA: none; ICAO: LJSO (formerly LJVE)

Summary
- Airport type: Public
- Operator: Šaleški Aeroklub
- Serves: Šoštanj; Velenje
- Location: Topolšica
- Elevation AMSL: 378 m / 1,240 ft
- Coordinates: 46°23′53″N 015°02′42″E
- Website: http://www.saleskiaeroklub.si/

Map
- Location of airport in Slovenia

Runways
Direction	Length		Surface
Direction	m	ft	Surface
15/33	714	2,343	Asphalt

Šoštanj Airport (ICAO: LJSO) (Slovene: Letališče Šoštanj) is a small airport located in the settlement of Topolšica, Slovenia. It lies 2.2 kilometers (1.4 mi) north of Šoštanj and 6.2 kilometers (3.9 mi) northwest of Velenje. Given its short asphalt runway, the airport serves only small general aviation aircraft, up to 5,670 kilograms (12,500 lb) MTOM. Heavier aircraft can land at the discretion of the PIC if the performance is adequate. Examples of the heaviest aircraft operated at LJSO are Slovenian Air Force Cougar at 9000 kg MTOM, Solinair Turbolet 410 at 6600 kg MTOM, and Gorenje Cessna Citation I 5375 kg MTOM. The airport is maintained by Šaleški Aeroklub.

== History ==
=== First flights ===
Interest in aviation in the Šalek Valley was catalyzed by the landing of a first powered Italian aircraft in 1927. The second plane flew to Šoštanj in 1930 and landed under the Marovška manor near the current airport. This aircraft was a Comper Swift, owned by industrialist Tomáš Baťa in 1930.

Through the 1930s, aviation enthusiasts Maks Medved and Valter Muhovec attempted to circumvent the lack of tools and equipment and assembled a home-built glider; however, the aircraft was completely destroyed during a test run in 1937. The pair then enlisted the expertise Žarko Majcen, who was an active aviator of the flying club Naša Krila in Maribor for help and created their own flying club.

=== The aeroclub ===
A constituent assembly for the club was held on 19 February 1939, at which Valter Muhovec was elected chairman of the committee. In 1939, following the plans and expert guidance of Žarko Majcen from Maribor, the construction of the DFS Zögling glider began. They also built a “flight simulator”. After seven months and 1500 hours of construction, the Zögling glider was finished. Test pilot Žarko Majcen made his first flight successfully on 24 September 1939 in Lajše. After a successful trial, they organized an introductory sailing course. By 22 November 1939, they stopped flying and some “A” exams had been completed. On 3 February 1940, the authorities prohibited operation of the aeroclub. On 11 December 1940, the members held a general assembly in Šoštanj and a modeling section was established. They elected a new president of the board, Dr. Stane Medic, and vice-president Srečko Robinščak. The aspirations of these early aviators were cut short by the outbreak of World War II.

=== After WW2 ===
Following the Second World War, new activities began at the airport in May 1961. The aeroclub was officially established on 24 November 1971. The first post-war president of the club was Peter Robida, and the vice-president Tone Kovačič. The first manager of the club was Vladimir Kočevar. The airport's grass runway was constructed between 1972 and 1973. The club's first silver C flight was performed by Jože Ocepek on 24 March 1974 from Celje airport to the then existing Ljubljana Polje airport with the Blanik L-13 glider. The flying club took possession of the hangar on 14 December 1974, and the asphalt runway was finished in October 1980. Today, the Šalek flying club is the sole owner and operator of the airport.

== Facilities ==
The airport has one asphalt runway with dimensions 714 by 18 meters (2,343 ft × 59 ft). It lies on a northeast-southwest axis with true heading 149.2° (329.2°). Significantly, surrounding terrain and wind patterns mean that the runway is usable only in one direction: runway 15 is for takeoff only, while runway 33 may only be used for landing. An area of hardened grass stretches approximately 150 meters (490 ft) beyond the threshold of runway 33, and may be used for aircraft maneuvering in appropriate weather.

The runway is connected to small ramp and hangar by a single paved taxiway designated A, necessitating either a backtrack along the runway or taxiing on the grass following landing and preceding takeoff. Several areas of grass between the runway and hangar are also sufficiently hardened to be used by light aircraft during appropriate weather. There is another taxiway on the north side of the airport designated as taxiway Y, which is in use for aircraft access from a private hangar to the runway.

The airport is also equipped with a fuel pump, light maintenance equipment, and a guest house. The airport has no control tower, and is open to VFR flights only; pilots communicate with each other on the frequency 128.305 MHz.

Nearby navigation aids include:

- VOR/DME Dolsko, DOL 112.70Mhz, Radial/Range: 026°/21.9NM
- VOR/DME Klangenfurt, KFT 113.1Mhz, Radial/Range: 116°/23.3NM
- VOR/DME Koralalpe, KOR 109.4Mhz, Radial/Range: 168°/23.6NM
- NDB Ljubljana, MG 296khz, Bearing/Range: QDR236/24.4NM
- NDB Klagenfurt, KFT 374khz, Bearing/Range: QDR302/25.2NM
- VOR/DME Ljubljana, LBL 117.2Mhz, Radial/Range: 065°/27.4NM
- NDB Maribor, MI 355khz, Bearing/Range: QDR081/27.6NM
- NDB Klagenfurt, KI 313khz, Bearing/Range: QDR313/30.9NM
- NDB Maribor, MR 334khz, Bearing/Range: QDR090/31.1NM
- VOR/DME Cerklje ob Krki COK 108.25Mhz, Radial/Range: 332°/35.8NM
