= Château-Thierry – Belleau Aerodrome =

Airport in Belleau, France

Château-Thierry - Belleau Aerodrome Aérodrome de Château-Thierry - Belleau
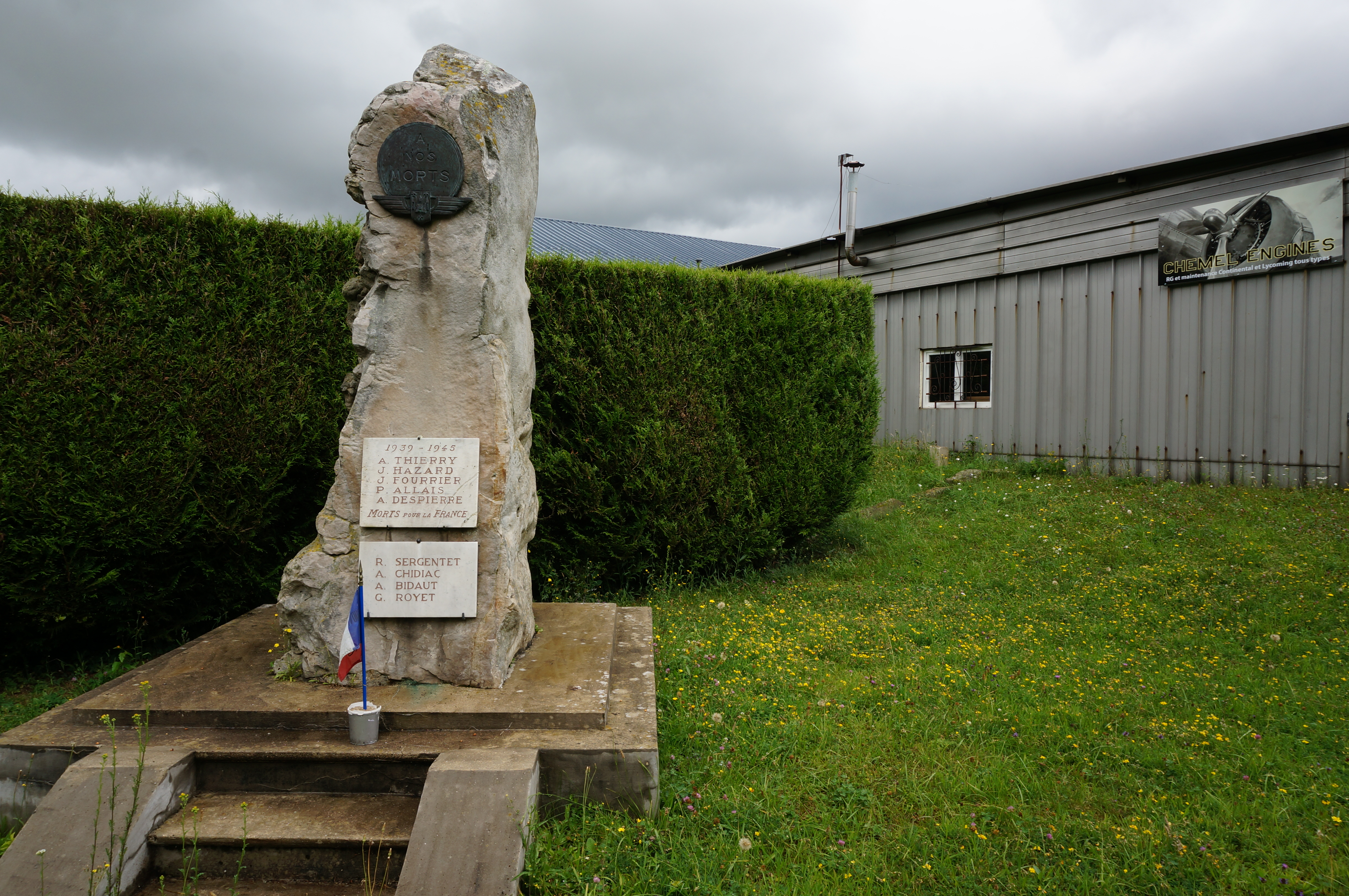
- IATA: none; ICAO: LFFH

Summary
- Airport type: Public
- Operator: Club aéronautique de Château Thierry
- Serves: Château-Thierry, France
- Location: Belleau
- Elevation AMSL: 723 ft / 220 m
- Coordinates: 49°04′00″N 003°21′20″E

Map
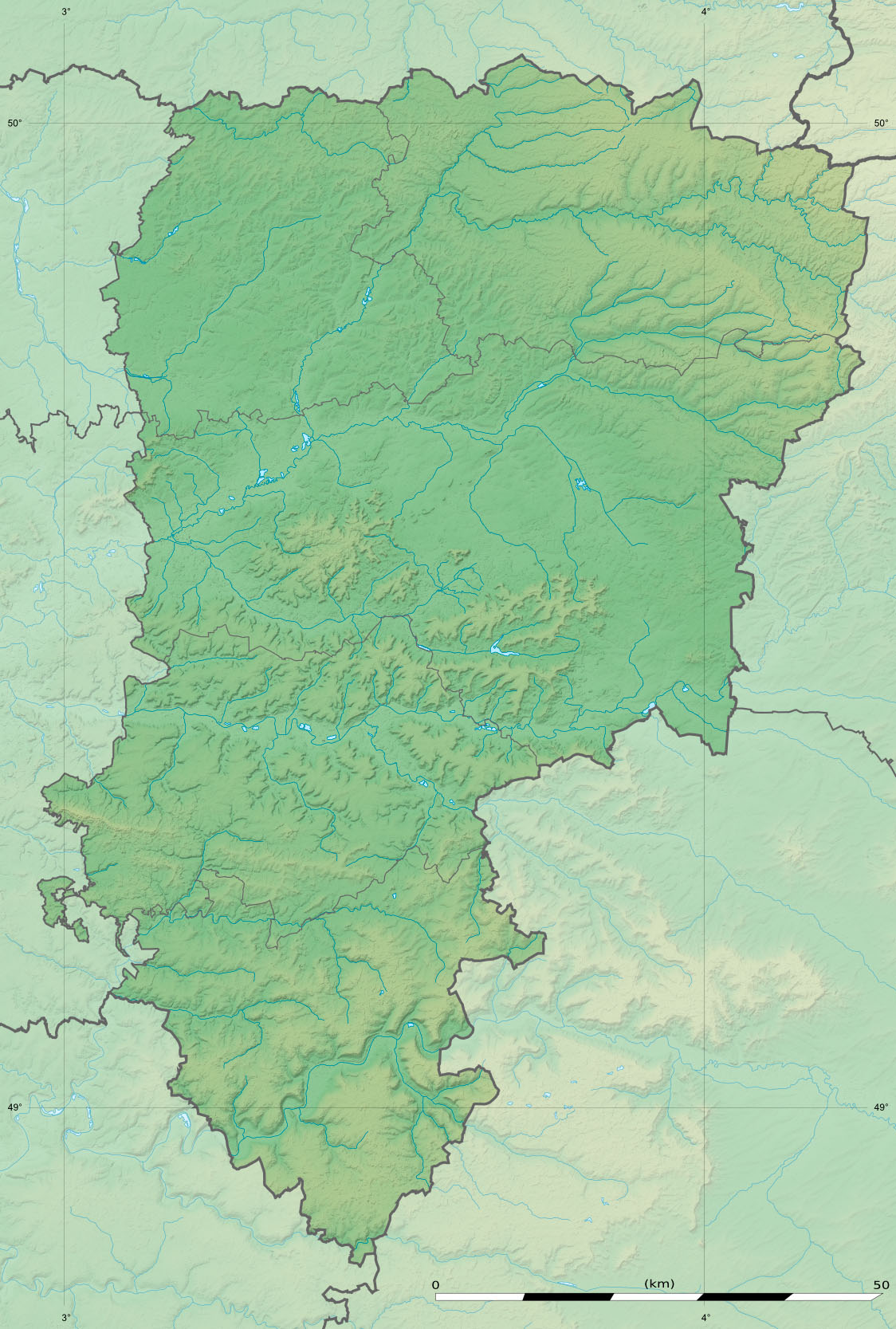
- Location of airport in Aisne department Location of Aisne department in France

Runways
Direction	Length		Surface
Direction	m	ft	Surface
04/22	930	3,051	Grass
- Source: AIP France

Château-Thierry – Belleau Aerodrome (French: Aérodrome de Château-Thierry - Belleau) (ICAO: LFFH) is an aerodrome or airport located 3 km (2 NM) northwest of Château-Thierry and southeast of Belleau, both communes in the Aisne department of the Picardy (Picardie) region in France.

== Facilities ==
The airport resides at an elevation of 723 feet (220 m) above mean sea level. It has one runway designated 04/22 with a grass surface measuring 930 by 50 metres (3,051 ft × 164 ft).

The airport is not controlled. The communications frequency is 120.375 MHz, which is shared with the nearby Soissons-Courmelles Aerodrome.
