= Marmande – Virazeil Airport =

Marmande - Virazeil Airport
- IATA: none; ICAO: LFDM

Summary
- Airport type: Public
- Location: Virazeil, Lot-et-Garonne, France
- Elevation AMSL: 105 ft / 32 m
- Coordinates: 44°29′57″N 000°12′01″E

Map

Runways
Direction	Length		Surface
Direction	m	ft	Surface
11/29	1,200	3,934	Asphalt
- Source: French AIP

Marmande – Virazeil Airport (IATA: none, ICAO: LFDM) is an airport located near Marmande in the Lot-et-Garonne in South West France.
