= Belfort Chaux Airport =

Belfort Chaux Airport Aérodrome de Belfort - Chaux
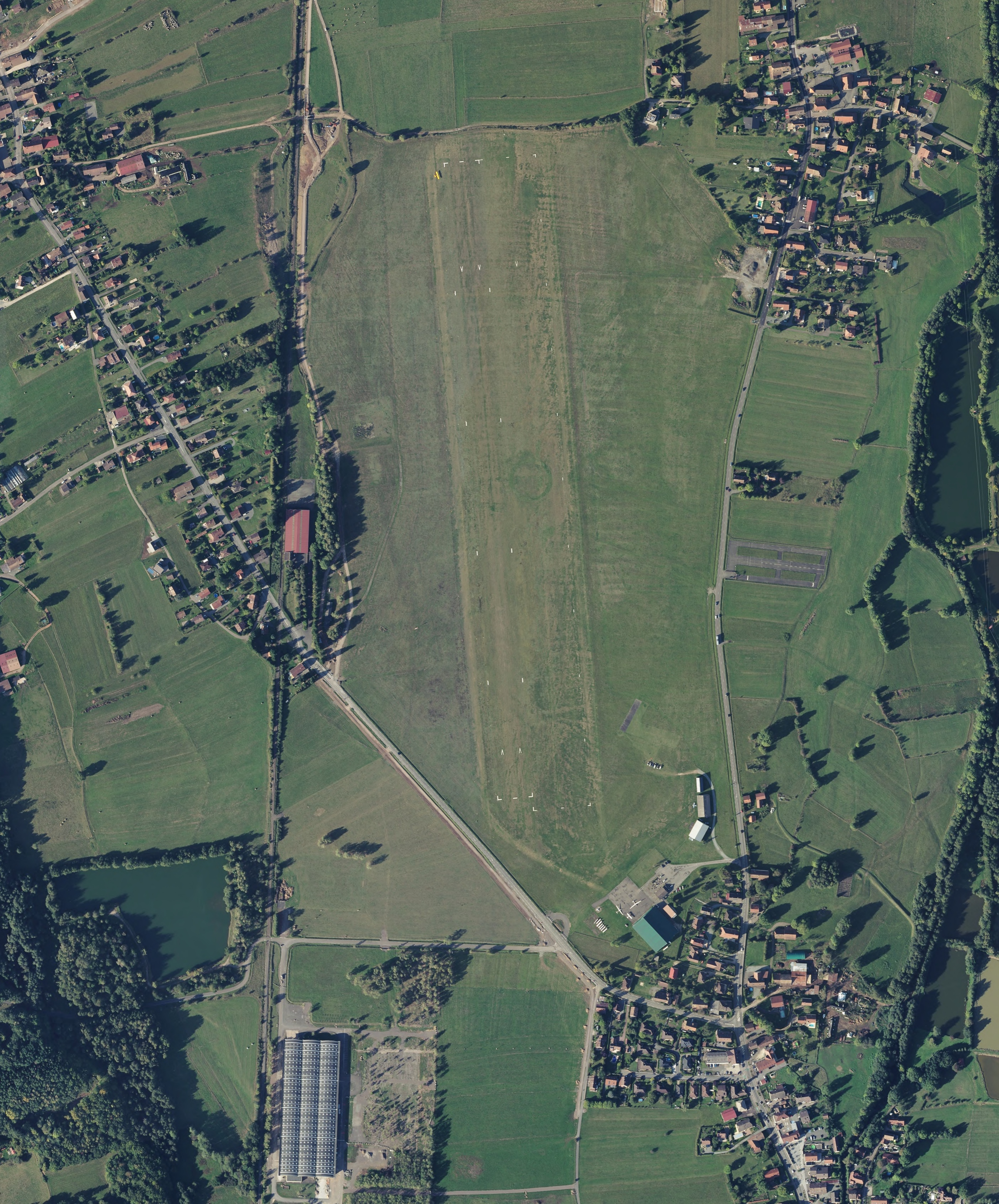
- IATA: none; ICAO: LFGG

Summary
- Airport type: Public
- Operator: Conseil Général du Territoire de Belfort
- Serves: Belfort, France
- Location: Chaux
- Elevation AMSL: 1,367 ft / 417 m
- Coordinates: 47°42′04″N 006°49′51″E

Map
- Location of airport in France

Runways
Direction	Length		Surface
Direction	m	ft	Surface
18R/36L	920	3,018	Grass
18L/36R	920	3,018	Grass
- Source: AIP France

Belfort Chaux Airport (French: Aérodrome de Belfort - Chaux, ICAO: LFGG) is a small aerodrome in Chaux, a commune in the Territoire de Belfort department in Franche-Comté in north eastern France. It is located 7 kilometres (4 mi) north of Belfort. There is an aeroclub based here.

The airport is served by only one regular bus link, provided by Optymo. This is bus line number 37, which runs from Belfort town centre every hour. A restaurant with excellent views across the airfield is open all year. Parking is available on site. This is the only airport in Belfort, after the closure of Belfort's other airport in the 1970s.

== Facilities ==
The airport resides at an elevation of 1,367 feet (417 m) above mean sea level. There are two parallel grass runways: 18R/36L measures 920 by 50 metres (3,020 ft × 160 ft) and 18L/36R is 920 by 80 metres (3,020 ft × 260 ft).

There are no visual aids to aircraft on the airfield. There are also hangars used to store light aircraft, mainly for the aeroclub. The airport has also been used for music festivals and special events including air shows, usually in summer.

The airport has some physical challenges. It is situated next to mountain ranges, which causes strong and sometimes severe northeast winds. During winter, the airport is usually closed if the runways are covered in snow.
