= Dunkerque – Les Moëres Airfield =

- IATA: none; ICAO: LFAK

Summary
- Airport type: Restricted use
- Operator: Syndicat Intercommunal des Dunes de Flandre
- Location: Dunkerque
- Elevation AMSL: −3 ft (−0.91 m)
- Coordinates: 51°2′32″N 2°33′11″E
- Website: www.aeroclub-dunkerque.com
- Interactive map of Dunkerque – Les Moëres Airfield

Runways
Direction	Length		Surface
Direction	m	ft	Surface
07/25	638	2,100	Grass
- Source: DGAC

Dunkerque – Les Moëres Airfield (ICAO: LFAK) is a recreational aerodrome in Les Moëres, 12 kilometres (7.5 mi) east of Dunkerque, Nord, France.

== History ==
Unfar from the then front line, the airfield served French and Belgian aviators in World War I.

== Characteristics ==
- Terrain elevation : -1 metre
- Runway : 07/25 grass, 638x50m
- Two hangars for club planes
- Ultralight aviation activity on adjacent terrain

== Aeroclubs on the airfield ==
- Dunkerque aeroclub
- Ultralight aviation club Les Cigognes, on a zone (200x35m) next to the main airfield

== Events ==
- Annual meeting in June.

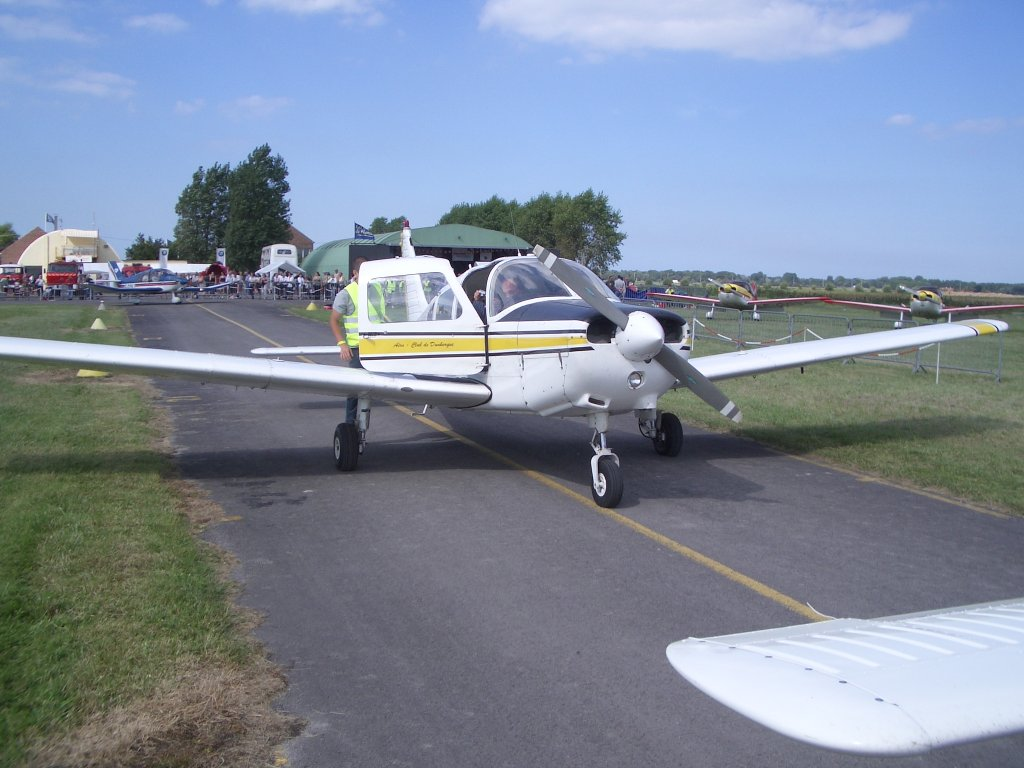
General view of 2005 meeting

== Planes ==
- 2 Robin DR400 (F-GDEM and F-GMOA)
- 2 Piper PA28 (F-GFJJ and F-GMSE)
