= Erden Airfield =

- IATA: none; ICAO: LBRD

Summary
- Airport type: Public
- Owner: AVA Sky EAD
- Location: Boychinovtsi, Bulgaria
- Elevation AMSL: 623 ft / 192 m
- Coordinates: 43°29′57″N 023°18′17″E
- Interactive map of Erden Airfield

Runways
Direction	Length		Surface
Direction	m	ft	Surface
13/31	700	2,296	Macadam
- Source: Bulgarian CAA

Erden Airfield (ICAO: LBRD) is an airfield in Montana Province, Bulgaria. The airfield was built in 2006 and is located 5 km south of Boychinovtsi near the village of Erden.
