= Börgönd Airport =

- IATA: none; ICAO: LHBD

Summary
- Airport type: Public
- Operator: Albatrosz Repülő Egyesület
- Serves: Székesfehérvár, Hungary
- Location: Börgönd, Fejér County, Hungary
- Opened: 1936
- Elevation AMSL: 404 ft (123 m)
- Coordinates: 47°07′25″N 18°29′55″E
- Website: www.albaairport.hu
- Interactive map of Börgönd Airport

Runways
Direction	Length		Surface
Direction	ft	m	Surface
01/19	1,200	366	Grass

Börgönd Airport (Hungarian: Börgöndi repülőtér) is located in the administrative area of Székesfehérvár and Aba, 10 km south of Székesfehérvár, near the district of Börgönd. Since its opening, it has hosted numerous airshows and other events.

== History ==
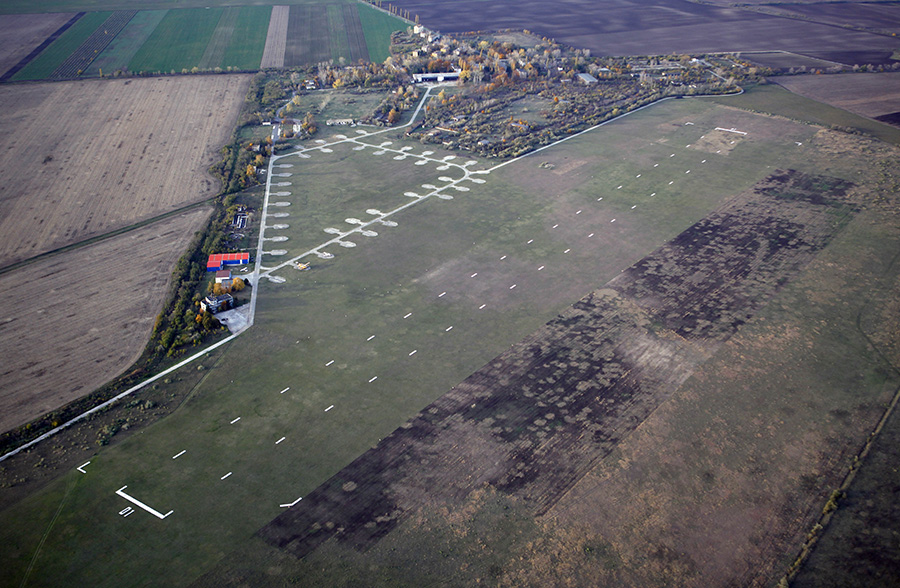
The airport

Since 1995, the Albatrosz Flying Association has represented aviation and flying sports in Börgönd and, at the same time, in Székesfehérvár.

In 2008, Alba Airport signed a development contract with the leaders of Székesfehérvár and Aba, which own the airport area, and Biggeorge's-NV ZRt became involved in the development of the airport. The developments were intended to make the airport an international airport and accessible to low-cost carrier airlines.
