= Villefranche–Tarare Airfield =

Villefranche–Tarare Airfield Aérodrome de Villefranche–Tarare
- IATA: none; ICAO: LFHV

Summary
- Airport type: Public
- Operator: CCI de Villefranche
- Location: Villefranche-sur-Saône
- Elevation AMSL: 328 m / 1,076 ft
- Coordinates: 45°55′07″N 004°38′06″E
- Interactive map of Villefranche–Tarare Airfield

Runways
| Direction | Length | | Surface |
| Direction | m | ft | Surface |
|---|---|---|---|
| 18/36 | 1,040 | 3,412 | Asphalt |
| 18L/36R | 880 | 2,887 | Grass |

Villefranche–Tarare Airfield (French: Aérodrome de Villefranche–Tarare) (ICAO: LFHV) is a recreational airfield situated 10 km southwest of Villefranche-sur-Saône, a commune in the Rhône département of the Rhône-Alpes région of east-central France.

== Airlines and destinations ==
No scheduled commercial air service as of 2024, and none in the pipeline as far as documented.
