= Albertville Aerodrome =

Albertville Aerodrome Aérodrome d'Albertville
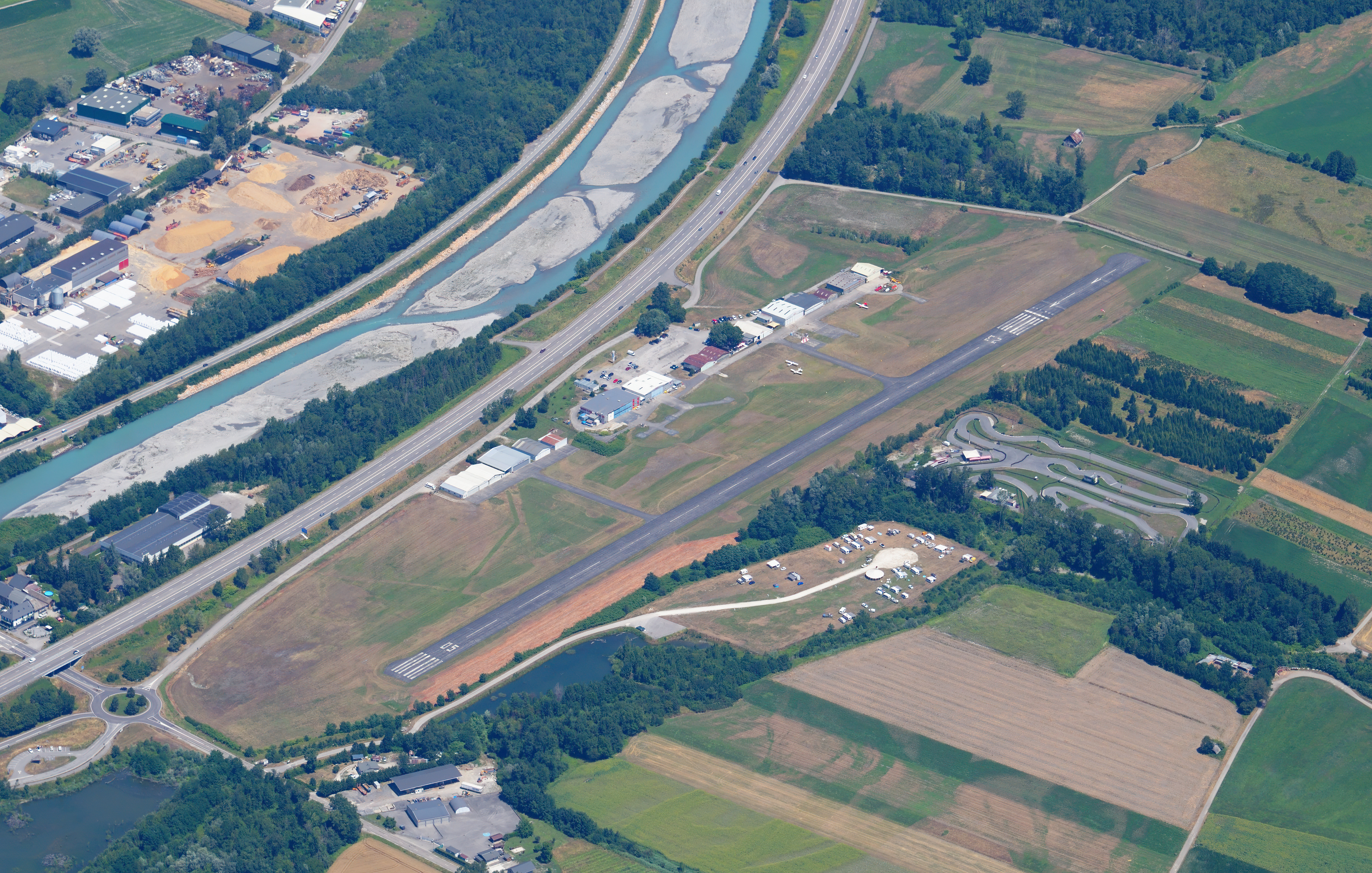
- IATA: XAV; ICAO: LFKA

Summary
- Airport type: Public
- Serves: Albertville
- Location: Tournon
- Elevation AMSL: 1,033 ft (315 m)
- Coordinates: 45°37′39″N 006°19′47″E
- Interactive map of Albertville Aerodrome

Runways
| Direction | Length | | Surface |
| Direction | ft | m | Surface |
|---|---|---|---|
| 05/23 | 2,625 | 800 | Paved |

Albertville Aerodrome (French: Aérodrome d'Albertville) (IATA: XAV, ICAO: LFKA) is an airport in Tournon, a commune in Savoie, France.
