= Divača Airport =

Airport in Divača, Slovenia

Divača Airport Letališče Divača
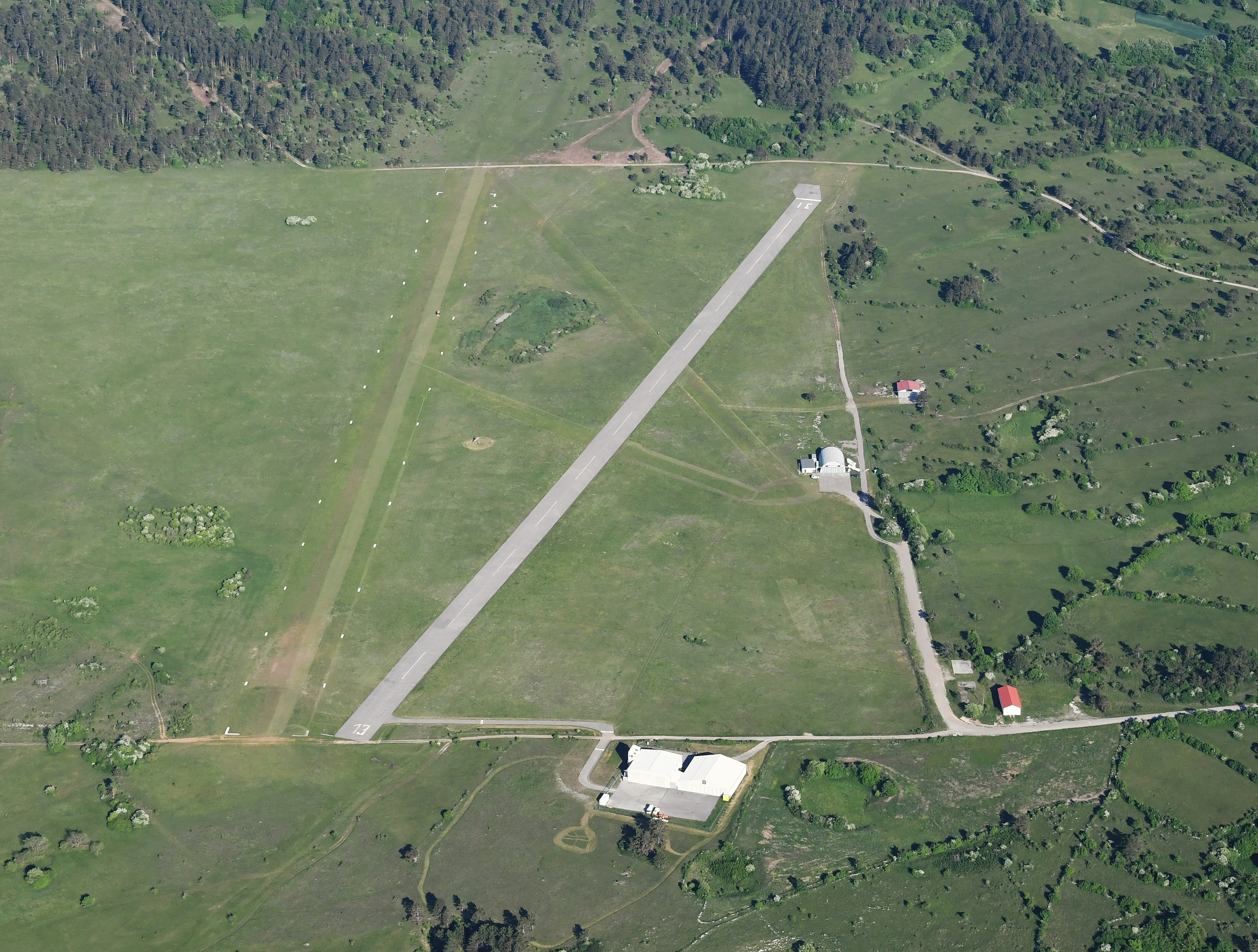
- IATA: none; ICAO: LJDI

Summary
- Airport type: Public
- Operator: JanezLet d.o.o.
- Serves: Divača
- Location: Divača, Slovenia
- Elevation AMSL: 432 m / 1,439 ft
- Coordinates: 45°40′58.69″N 014°0′10.34″E
- Website: https://web.archive.org/web/20090912115957/http://www.janezlet.si/e/
- Interactive map of Divača Airport

Runways
Direction	Length		Surface
Direction	m	ft	Surface
12/30	800	2,625	Grass
13/31	800	2,625	Asphalt

Divača Airport is one of two airports still in use after being built for the Battles of the Soča.

== JanezLet ==
=== Aircraft ===
Aircraft	Origin	Registration	Number	Notes
Beechcraft Musketeer	United States		1	
Partenavia P.68	United States	S5-CER	1	
Cessna 172	United States	S5-DOO - S5-DKM	2	

== History ==
Divača airport is the oldest active airport in Slovenia and has interesting history. The airport was built from 1916 to 1917 (109 years ago) and was used as a bomber base during World War I. After that, the airport was owned by Italian authorities and until 1942 the Italian Army used it. After World War II, the airport started to perish. In the mid-1980s, Divača airport started developing again. There was a gradual development through years.

The airport has two 800-meter (2,600 ft) long runways, one paved and other one covered with grass;, two hangars, control tower, offices and all the necessary equipment for aircraft operations. Airport Divača is a home for 12 aircraft. It is located at the foot of a hill Vremščica, 3.5 km (2.2 mi) east from city of Divača.
