= El Copero =

Spanish Military Base

El Copero Military Base
- Base Militar "El Copero"
- Dos Hermanas, Seville, Spain.
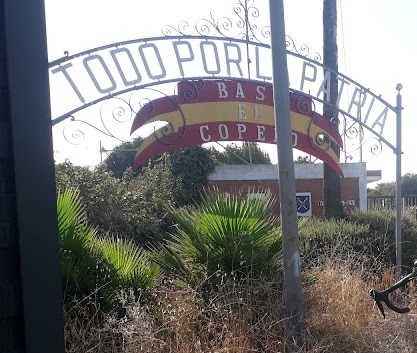
- The enttrance of the military base

Site information
- Type: Military base
- Operator: Ejército de Tierra
- Controlled by: Spain

Location
- Coordinates: 37.18°N 6.0°W

El Copero is a Spanish military base located in Dos Hermanas, Spain.

== Geography ==
The base is located next to the river Guadalquivir, one of the major rivers of Spain.

== Installations ==
The base counts with a military heliport.

In April 2022, an investment of 43 million euros was made to expand the base. Its infrastructure is famous for being environment friendly.

El Copero Military Base Aerodrome El Copero Aeródromo Militar
- IATA: none; ICAO: none

Summary
- Owner/Operator: Ejército de Tierra
- Location: Dos Hermanas
- Interactive map of El Copero Military Base Aerodrome

=== Regiments and Brigades ===
Inside this base, the 32 Regiment of Electronic War is located there since 1996, when it merged with the Regiment of the same name 22.

El Copero also counts with the Bhelma-IV brigade, a helicopter battalion, which has existed continuously since 1979.

== History ==
In the year 2000, a helicopter accident caused by the Bhelma-IV brigade, which is located there, when it was transporting an injured man from another military base in Ceuta. There were no survivors.

In consequence of the COVID-19 pandemic, 25 soldiers received special training to control the health situation in the base. In 2023, around 20 Ukrainian soldiers received special training in the base, with an 80 hours a week program for two weeks.

== Awards ==
In 2020, the base was awarded the Sistema de Acuartelamiento del Éjercito de Tierra. This award made it the best military base in Spain of 2020.

=== Visits by public figures ===
In 2002, the King of Spain Juan Carlos I visited the military base. Fifteen years after his father, in 2018, the current King of Spain Felipe VI went to see the installations.

In 2022, the Minister of Defence Margarita Robles visited the place. In September 2024, the mayor of Dos Hermanas, Seville, visited the base.
