= Fertőszentmiklós =

- Town
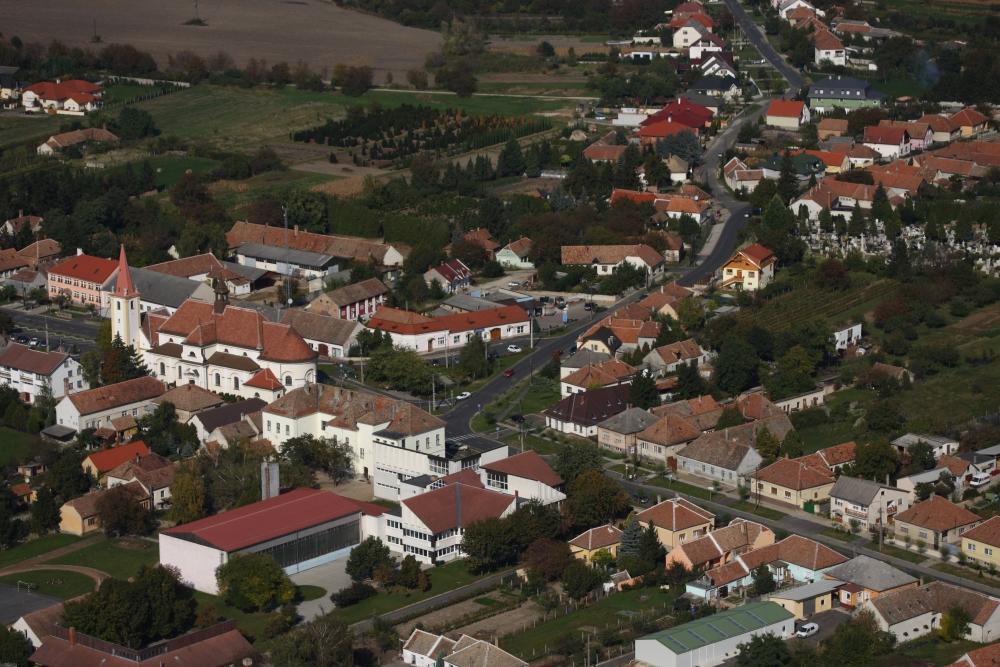
- Aerial view

- Flag Coat of arms

- Location of Győr-Moson-Sopron county in Hungary

- Location of Fertőszentmiklós
- Coordinates: 47.58533°N 16.87052°E
- Country: Hungary
- County: Győr-Moson-Sopron
- District: Sopron

Area
  - Total: 39.39 km^{2} (15.21 sq mi)

Population (2015)
  - Total: 3,854
  - Density: 97.84/km^{2} (253.4/sq mi)
- Time zone: UTC+1 (CET)
  - Summer (DST): UTC+2 (CEST)
- Postal code: 9444
- Area code: (+36) 99
- Website: www.fertoszentmiklos.hu

Fertőszentmiklós is a small town in Győr-Moson-Sopron county, Hungary.

== Geography ==
Fertőszentmiklós is located on the Small Plain and it is part of the Transdanubian region. It has a population of 3854 people (2015). Fertőszentmiklós is very well situated because it's close to the Hungarian-Austrian border. The name of the town comes from the fusion of two smaller villages: Szentmiklós and Szerdahely. So they called the new village Fertőszentmiklós.

== Twin towns — sister cities ==
Fertőszentmiklós is twinned with:

- Pleidelsheim, Germany (1994)
- Leopoldov, Slovakia (2003)
