= List of airports in Hungary =

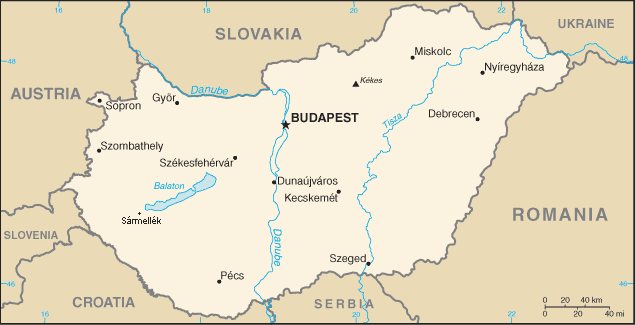
Map of Hungary

This is a list of airports in Hungary, grouped by type and sorted by location.

Hungary (Hungarian: Magyarország) is a landlocked country in the Carpathian Basin in Central Europe. It is bordered by Austria, Slovakia, Ukraine, Romania, Serbia, Croatia, and Slovenia. The capital city is Budapest.

Hungary is subdivided administratively into 20 regions which are the 19 counties (megyék, singular: megye) and the capital city (főváros) of Budapest. These are further subdivided into 198 townships (járások).

== Airports ==
ICAO location indicators link to airport page at HungaryAirport.hu. Airport names shown in bold indicate that the facility has commercial service on scheduled airlines.

Location served	County	ICAO	IATA	Airport name	Elev.	Runways
**International airports**						
Budapest		LHBP	BUD	**Budapest Ferenc Liszt International Airport**	151 m (495 ft)	3010 m x 59 m 3707 x 59 m
Debrecen	Hajdú-Bihar	LHDC	DEB	**Debrecen International Airport**	109 m (359 ft)	2498 m x 40 m
Sármellék	Zala	LHSM	SOB	Hévíz-Balaton Airport	124 m (408 ft)	2500 x 60 m
Győr-Pér	Győr-Moson-Sopron	LHPR	QGY	Győr-Pér International Airport	129 m (424 ft)	2030 x 30 m 1134 x 43 m
Pécs-Pogány	Baranya	LHPP	PEV	**Pécs-Pogány International Airport**	198 m (650 ft)	1500 x 30 m
**Domestic airports**						
Fertőszentmiklós	Győr-Moson-Sopron	LHFM		Fertőszentmiklós Airport	134 m (440 ft)	985 x 23 m
Nyíregyháza	Szabolcs-Szatmár-Bereg	LHNY		Nyíregyháza Airport	103 m (338 ft)	1000 x 20 m
Siófok	Somogy	LHSK		Siófok-Kiliti Airport	127 m (416 ft)	1250 x 50 m
Szeged	Csongrád	LHUD		Szeged Airport	80 m (262 ft)	1185 x 30 m 1177 x 50 m 610 x 50 m
**Military airports**						
Kecskemét	Bács-Kiskun	LHKE		Kecskemét Air Base	115 m (376 ft)	2499 x 60 m
Pápa	Veszprém	LHPA		Pápa Air Base	148 m (485 ft)	2400 x 60 m
Szolnok	Jász-Nagykun-Szolnok	LHSN		Szolnok Air Base	89 m (292 ft)	1999 x 70 m
Taszár	Somogy	LHTA		Taszár Air Base	160 m (526 ft)	2500 x 70 m
**Non-public airports**						
Békéscsaba	Békés	LHBC		Békéscsaba Airport	90 m (295 ft)	1300 x 30 m 790 x 40 m
Budakeszi	Pest	LHFH		Farkashegy Airport	215 m (705 ft)	1000 x 200 m
Budaörs	Pest	LHBS		Budaörs Airport	126 m (413 ft)	980 x 60 m 750 x 40 m
Budapest-Hármashatárhegy	(capital)	LHHH		Hármashatárhegy Airport	296 m (961 ft)	1000 x 100 m
Dunakeszi	Pest	LHDK		Dunakeszi Airport	126 m (413 ft)	800 x 500 m
Dunaújváros	Fejér	LHDV		Dunaújváros Airport	123 m (404 ft)	950 x 60 m
Eger	Heves	LHER		Eger Airport	258 m (846 ft)	800 x 70 m
Esztergom	Komárom-Esztergom	LHEM		Esztergom Airport	113 m (371 ft)	1000 x 80 m
Gödöllő	Pest	LHGD		Gödöllő Airport	218 m (715 ft)	1000 x 100 m
Gyöngyös-Pipishegy	Heves	LHGY		Gyöngyös Pipishegy Airport	350 m (1148 ft)	760 x 20 m
Gyúró	Fejér	LHGR		Gyúró Airport	199 m (653 ft)	750 x 20 m
Hajdúszoboszló	Hajdú-Bihar	LHHO		Hajdúszoboszló Airport	102 m (335 ft)	1000 x 50 m
Jakabszállás	Bács-Kiskun	LHJK		Jakabszállás Airport	111 m (364 ft)	600 x 18 m 1000 x 30 m
Kalocsa	Bács-Kiskun	LHKA		Kalocsa Airport	91 m (299 ft)	2500 x 60 m 1900 x 300 m
Kaposújlak	Somogy	LHKV		Kaposújlak Airport	156 m (512 ft)	610 x 18 m 1200 x 200 m
Kecskéd	Komárom-Esztergom	LHKD		Kecskéd Airport	174 m (571 ft)	1200 x 50 m 1000 x 50 m
Kecskemét	Bács-Kiskun	LHMP		Matkópuszta Airport	112 m (367 ft)	1200 x 100 m
Kiskunfélegyháza	Bács-Kiskun	LHKH		Kiskunfélegyháza Airport	97 m (318 ft)	758 x 160 m 536 x 100 m
Kiskunlacháza	Pest	LHKK		Kiskunlacháza Airport	98 m (322 ft)	2500 x 45 m
Maklár	Heves	LHMR		Maklár Airport	165 m (541 ft)	800 x 80 m
Miskolc	Borsod-Abaúj-Zemplén	LHMC	MCQ	Miskolc Airport	119 m (390 ft)	800 x 100 m
Nagykanizsa	Zala	LHNK		Nagykanizsa Airport	142 m (466 ft)	1000 x 100 m
Székesfehérvár	Fejér	LHBD		Börgönd Airport	123 m (404 ft)	1200 x 200 m
Szekszárd	Tolna	LHOY		Õcsény Airport	90 m (295 ft)	1200 x 150 m
Szentes	Csongrád	LHSZ		Szentes Airport	84 m (276 ft)	750 x 150 m
Szolnok-Szandaszőlős	Jász-Nagykun-Szolnok	LHSS		Szolnok–Szandaszőlős Airport	85 m (279 ft)	1050 x 200 m
Szombathely	Vas	LHSY		Szombathely Airport	223 m (732 ft)	1150 x 80 m
Tököl	Pest	LHTL		Tököl Airport	100 m (328 ft)	2500 x 60 m 1100 x 50 m
Veszprém-Szentkirályszabadja	Veszprém	LHSA		Veszprém-Szentkirályszabadja Airport (BudaWest Airport)	280 m (918 ft)	2000 x 60 m
Zalaegerszeg-Andráshida	Zala	LHZA		Zalaegerszeg-Andráshida Airport	196 m (643 ft)	1500 x 40 m
Zalakaros	Zala	LHZK		Zalakaros Airport	127 m (445 ft)	900 x 60 m

== See also ==
- Hungarian Air Force
- Transport in Hungary
- List of airports by ICAO code: L#LH – Hungary
- Wikipedia:WikiProject Aviation/Airline destination lists: Europe#Hungary
