= Maszovlet =

Hungarian Airline

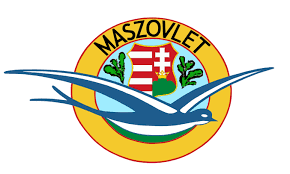
IATA	ICAO	Call sign
–	MSU	–
- Founded: March 29, 1946
- Commenced operations: October 15, 1946
- Ceased operations: November 25, 1954
- Operating bases: Budaörs Airport (1946–1950) Ferihegy International Airport (1950–1954)
- Fleet size: 10
- Destinations: 17
- Headquarters: Budapest

Maszovlet (short for Magyar–Szovjet Polgári Légiforgalmi Részvénytársaság, "Hungarian-Soviet Civil Air Transport Joint Stock Company") was a Hungarian airline founded on March 29, 1946. It was a predecessor of Malév Hungarian Airlines.

== History ==
The first Hungarian airline companies, Aeroexpress Rt., Magyar Aeroforgalmi Rt. (Maefort) and Magyar Légiforgalmi Rt. (Malert) had to suspend operations during World War II. Maszovlet was founded after the war as the national airline of the newly Communist state, with technical assistance from the Soviet Union. The airline was jointly owned by Hungary and the USSR.

In the beginning its fleet consisted of five 21-seat Lisunov Li-2 passenger aircraft (a licensed Soviet version of Douglas DC-3) and five 3-seat Po-2 plane which carried air mail. Its base was Budaörs Airport, the pre-war international airport of the country (Ferihegy airport had already been under construction but suffered severe damages during the war). Domestic flights started on October 15, 1946 from Budapest to Szombathely and Debrecen; flights to Szeged and Győr started the same year. The airline had 1864 passengers in the short period between October 15 and the end of the year. In 1947 the airline received another four Li-2 aircraft, followed by two in 1948, finally in 1952 another Li-2, originally bought for the Army, was added to the airline fleet to replace a plane lost to an accident earlier during the year.

From 1947 the capital was connected by regular flights to Miskolc and Pécs, and during the next years Békéscsaba, Kaposvár, Nagykanizsa, Nyíregyháza and Zalaegerszeg also joined the list of destinations. Seasonal summer flights connected the capital to Siófok, a popular holiday destination next to Lake Balaton. Not all flights originated from Budapest; for example, from 1952 there were flights between Szeged and Pécs, and from 1954 between Pécs and Kaposvár. The extensive domestic flight network consisting of relatively short routes (the distance to most of these cities is between 120 km and 230 km) was necessitated by the fact that motorways and railways suffered great damage during the war. Flights cost around the same as a first-class train ticket.

International flights started already in 1947, with the Budapest-Prague route. By the summer of 1954 the airline served 12 domestic airports and started services on the Warsaw, East Berlin and Bucharest routes.

In 1950 operations moved to the newly finished Ferihegy International Airport which has been Hungary's main airport ever since then. Budaörs airport is now used for general aviation only.

On November 25, 1954 Hungary bought the Soviet Union's shares in the company. This meant the end of Maszovlet and the birth of the new national airline Malév, which existed until its dissolution in 2012.

== Destinations ==
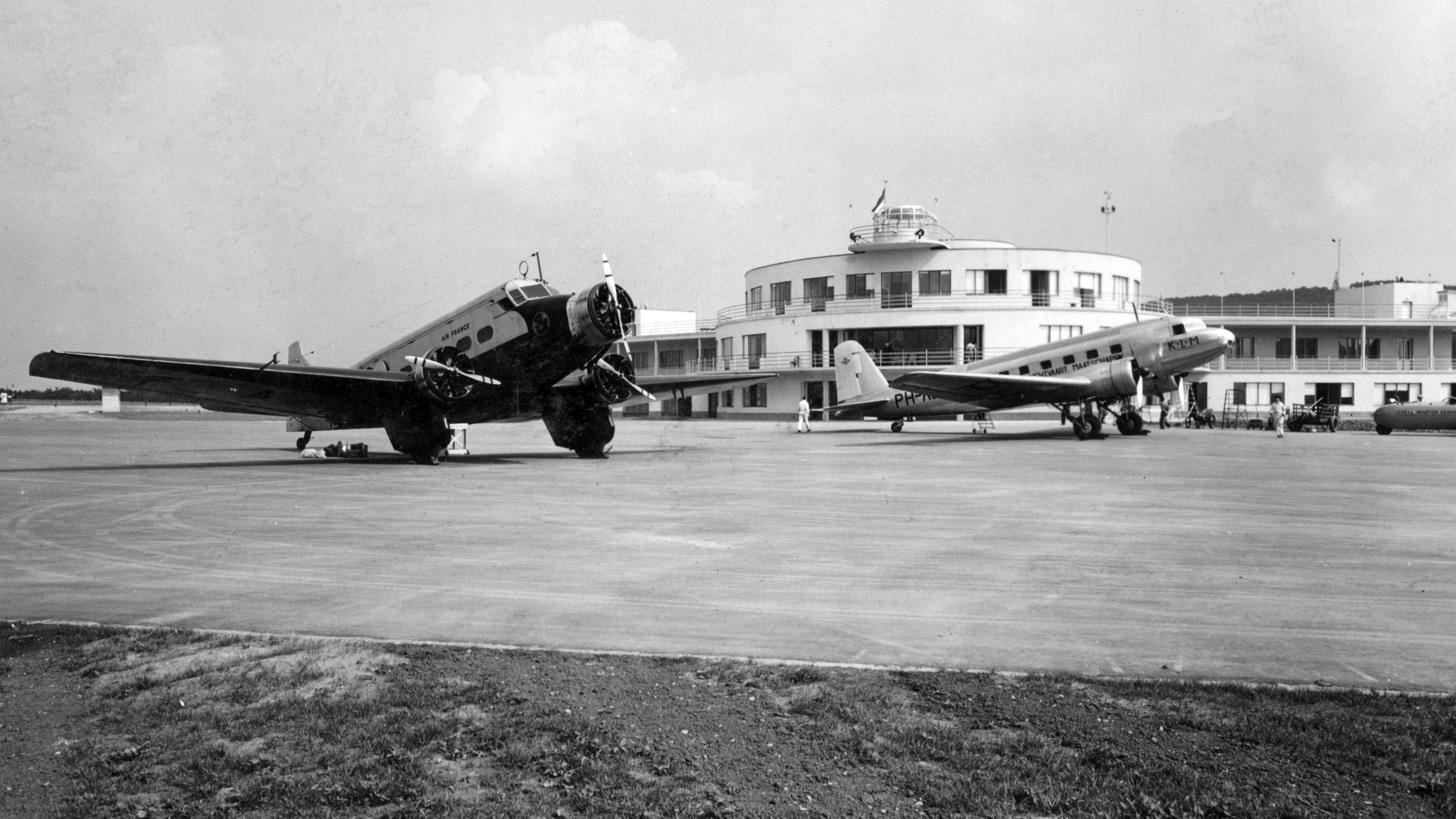
Planes at Budaörs Airport

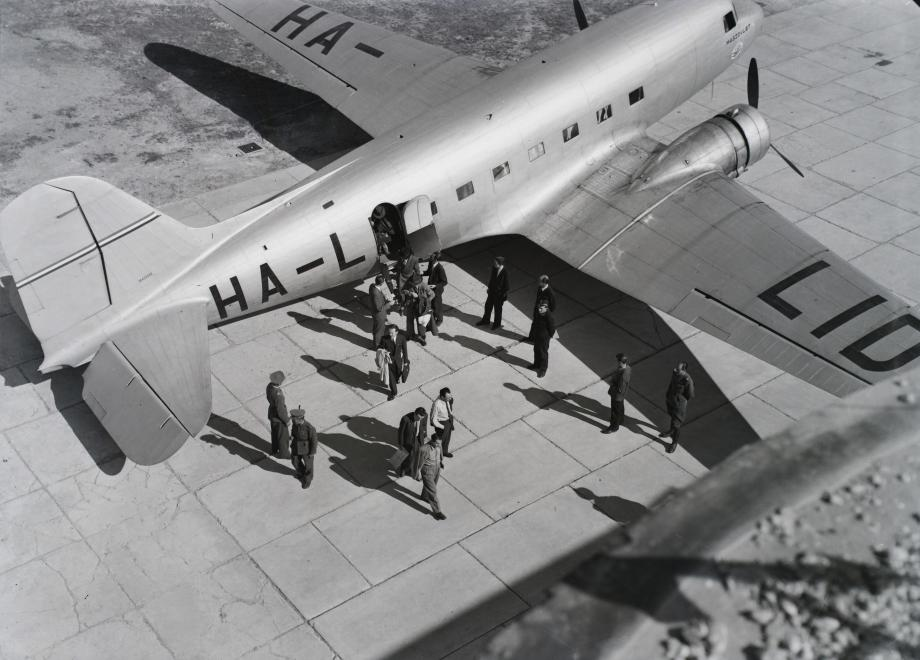
A Lisunov Li-2 (HA-LID) operated by Maszovlet at Budaörs in 1946

Domestic

- Békéscsaba Airport
- Budapest
  - Budaörs Airport (base until May 7, 1950)
  - Ferihegy International Airport (base after May 7, 1950)
- Debrecen Airport
- Győr Airport
- Kaposvár Airport
- Miskolc Airport
- Nagykanizsa Airport
- Nyíregyháza Airport
- Pécs Airport
- Siófok Airport (seasonal)
- Szeged Airport
- Szombathely Airport
- Zalaegerszeg Airport

International

- Berlin-Schönefeld Airport
- Bucharest–Băneasa Airport
- Prague–Ruzyně Airport
- Warsaw–Okęcie Airport

== Incidents and accidents ==
- On January 4, 1949 an Li-2 (HA-LIE) en route from Pécs to Budapest was hijacked by reserve flight lieutenant János Majoros and pilot Miklós Kun. The plane landed in Munich, West Germany. This was the first plane hijacking in Hungary after World War II. Both hijackers and some passengers stayed abroad; others returned to Hungary. After this incident planes carried ÁVH agents in civilian clothing, disguised as passengers.
- On November 14, 1949 Maszovlet Flight 381, a Li-2 (HA-LIK), en route from Budapest to Pécs, crashed into the Mecsek mountains due to poor visibility. All crew and one passenger, six persons in total, died, a security officer survived.
- On March 2, 1951 two aircraft mechanics took off in a Po-2 from Ferihegy and fled to the West.
- On October 2, 1952 an Li-2 (HA-LIL) was flying the Budapest–Miskolc–Nyíregyháza–Budapest route. Due to poor weather conditions the landing in Miskolc succeeded only at the third attempt, yet the crew decided to continue the flight towards Nyíregyháza, where after several landing attempts the plane landed on slippery grass and crashed into a building. Three crew members, including the pilot and the co-pilot, died, two other crew members and the three passengers suffered severe injuries.
