= List of the busiest airports in Hungary =

== Hungary's busiest airports by passenger traffic ==
Hungary's busiest airports by passenger traffic are mentioned below according to respective year.

== 2010-22 ==
Rank	Airport	2010	2011	2012	2013	2014	2015	2016	2017	2018	2019	2020	2021	2022
1	Budapest	8,190,089	8,920,653	8,504,020	8,520,880	9,155,961	10,298,963	11,441,999	13,097,223	14,867,491	16,173,399	3,859,379	4,622,886	12,205,070
2	Debrecen	24,415	19,135	47,746	129,231	145,709	172,212	284,965	318,342	381,391	601,236	122,742	75,716	249,448
3	Nyíregyháza	29,591	13,488	17,137	15,863	7,840	27,320	34,313	29,430					
4	Győr-Pér	11,112	18,976	30,314	31,274	33,817	29,437	21,454	22,785					
5	Hévíz-Balaton	14,828	18,191	18,831	25,015	28,588	15,748	17,663	13,229					
6	Pécs-Pogány	6,201	7,200	5,400	3,946	2,341	2,582	3,644	4,595					
7	Szeged	29,222	22,107	24,572	22,643	19,891								

== 2015 ==
Rank	Airport	Total Passengers	Annual change	Rank change
1	Budapest	10,298,963	▲11.75%	Steady
2	Debrecen	172,212	▲18.19%	Steady
3	Győr-Pér	29,437	▼12.95%	Steady
4	Nyíregyháza	27,320	▲248.47%	+1 ▲
5	Hévíz-Balaton	15,748	▼38.45%	-1 ▼
6	Pécs-Pogány	2,582	▲10.29%	Steady

== 2014 ==
Rank	Airport	Total Passengers	Annual change	Rank change
1	Budapest	9,155,961	▲7.19%	Steady
2	Debrecen	145,709	▲12.75%	Steady
3	Győr-Pér	33,817	▲8.13%	Steady
4	Hévíz-Balaton	28,588	▲14.28%	Steady
5	Nyíregyháza	7,840	▼50.57%	Steady
6	Pécs-Pogány	2,341	▼40.67%	Steady

== 2013 ==
Rank	Airport	Total Passengers	Annual change	Rank change
1	Budapest	8,520,880	▲0.2%	Steady
2	Debrecen	129,231	▲170.7%	Steady
3	Győr-Pér	31,274	▲3.2%	Steady
4	Hévíz-Balaton	25,015	▲32.8%	Steady
5	Nyíregyháza	15,863	▼7.4%	Steady
6	Pécs-Pogány	3,946	▼26.9%	Steady

== 2012 ==
Rank	Airport	Total Passengers	Annual change	Rank change
1	Budapest	8,504,020	▼4.6%	Steady
2	Debrecen	47,746	▲149.5%	Steady
3	Győr-Pér	30,314	▲59.7%	Steady
4	Hévíz-Balaton	18,831	▲3.5%	Steady
5	Nyíregyháza	17,137	▲27.1%	Steady
6	Pécs-Pogány	5,400	▼25.0%	Steady
