= Transport in Hungary =

Economy of Hungary

Transport in Hungary relies on several main modes, including transport by road, rail, air and water.

== Roads ==
Speed Limits in Hungary based on road type and vehicle category

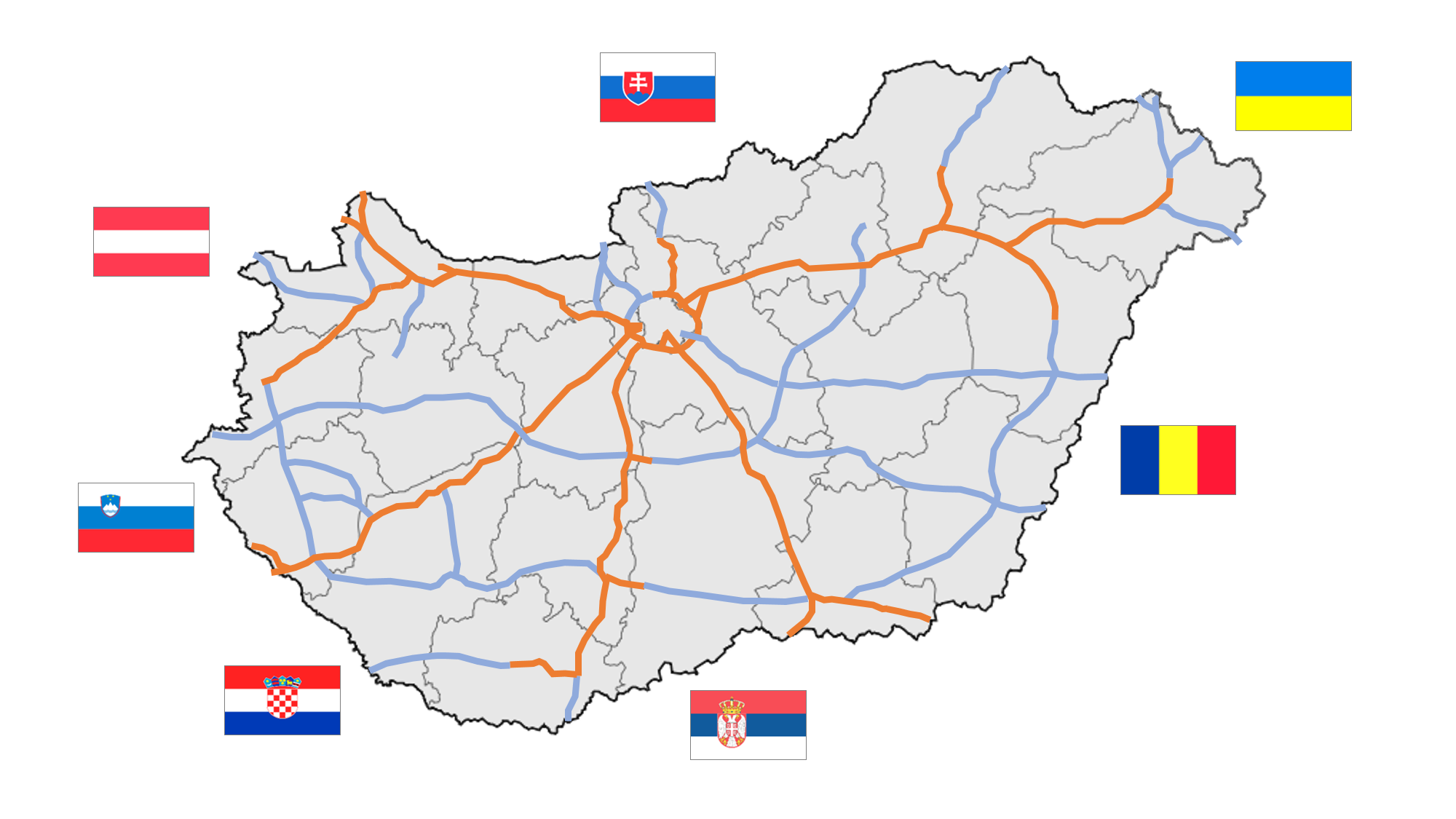
Map of planned motorway and expressway network in Hungary

Hungary has a total of 159,568 km (99,150 mi) of public roads, of which 70,050 km (43,530 mi) are paved (including 1481 km of motorways, as of 2016); and 89,518 km (55,620 mi) are unpaved (2005 etc.):

Hungarian road categories are as follows:

- Gyorsforgalmi út (controlled-access highway):
  - Autópálya (motorway): 2+2 travel lanes and 1+1 emergency lane, central reservation, no at-grade intersections, speed limit 130 kilometres per hour (81 mph)
  - Gyorsút (high-speed highway): 2+2 travel lanes, central reservation, few at-grade intersections, speed limit 110 kilometres per hour (68 mph)
  - Autóút (expressway): 2+2, 2+1 or 1+1 travel lanes, central reservation, some at-grade intersections, speed limit 110 kilometres per hour (68 mph)
- Elsőrendű főút (primary arterial road or primary main road) (with one-digit number, e.g. 6-os főút)
- Másodrendű főút (secondary main road) (with two or three digits, e.g. 57-es főút)
- Helyi út (local road) (with three or more digits, e.g. 4519-es közút)

=== Motorways and expressways ===
Hungarian motorways and expressways are part of the national road network. As of October 2016, there are 1,481 kilometres (920 mi) of controlled-access highways.

Motorways (autópályák, singular - autópálya) in Hungary:

M1 | M3 | M4 | M5 | M6 | M7 | M8 | M15 | M19 | M30 | M31 | M35 | M43 | M60

Expressways (autóutak, singular - autóút) in Hungary:

M0 | M2 | M9 | M51 | M70 | M85 | M86

New motorway sections are being added to the existing network, which already connects many major economically important cities to the capital.

=== Bus transport ===
Bus transport between municipalities was provided by Volán Companies, twenty-four bus companies founded in 1970 and named after the regions they served. They also provided local transport in cities and towns that did not have their own public transport company (all cities except for Budapest, Miskolc, Pécs, Kaposvár and also Debrecen after 2009), and operated bus lines in cities where the local company operated only tram and trolley bus lines (Szeged and Debrecen, the latter until 2009, when DKV took over the bus lines). In early 2015, the 24 companies were organized into seven regional companies.

== Railways ==
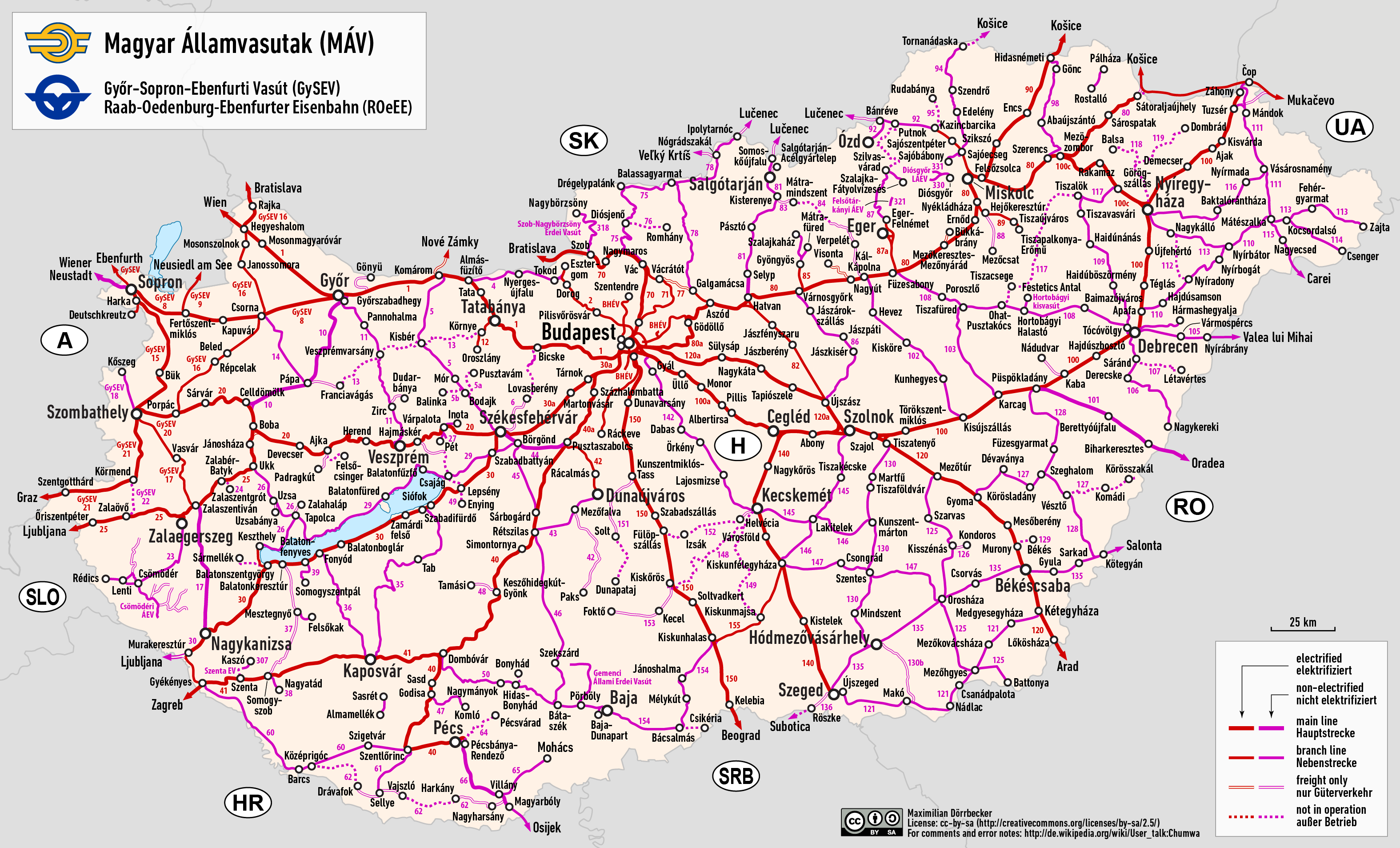
Rail transport map of Hungary

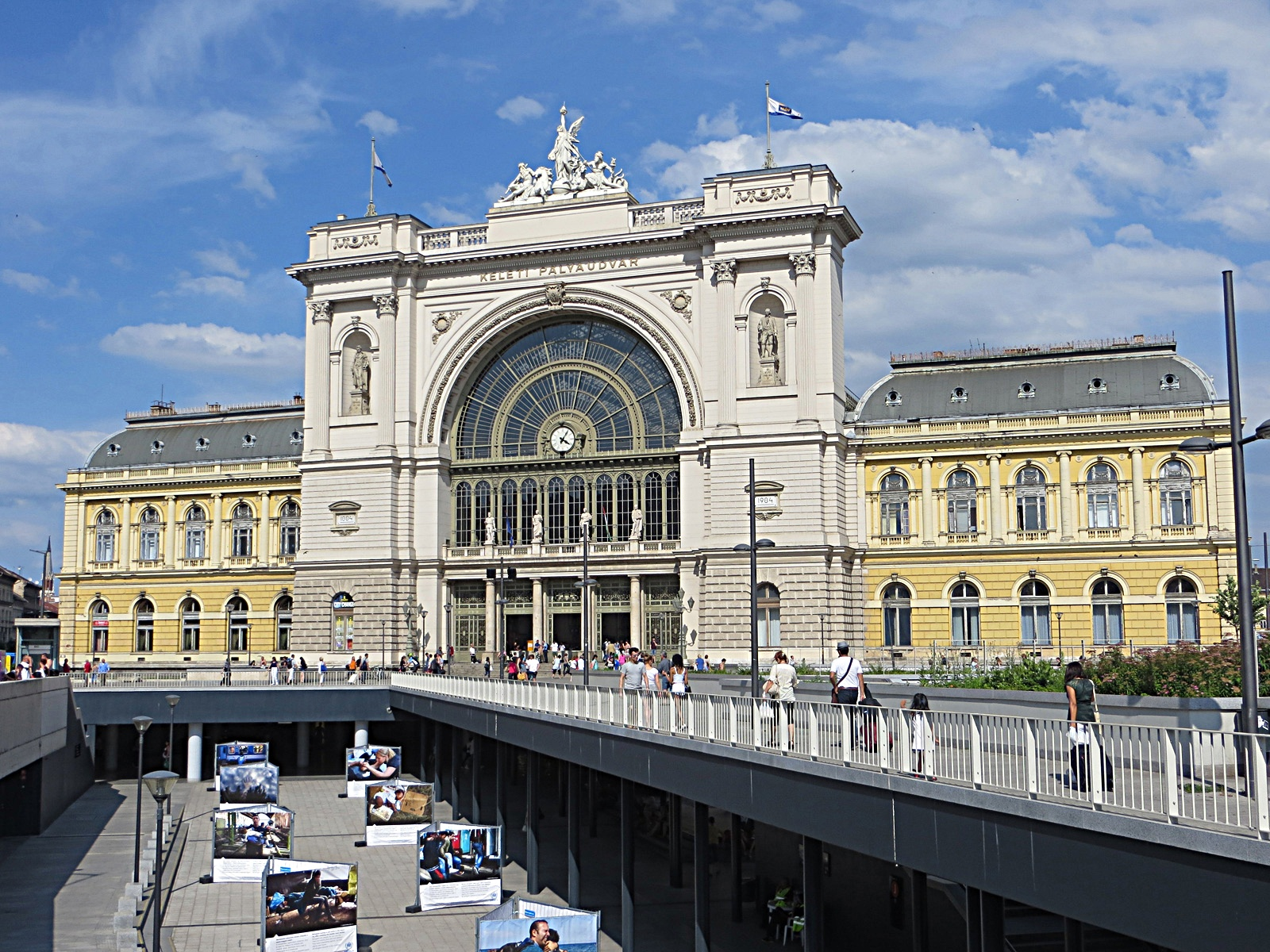
Keleti Railway Station, Budapest

Note: Hungary and Austria jointly manage the cross-border standard-gauge railway between Győr–Sopron–Ebenfurt (GySEV/ROeEE), a distance of about 101 km (63 mi) in Hungary and 65 km (40 mi) in Austria.

In Budapest, the three main railway stations are the Eastern (Keleti), Western (Nyugati) and Southern (Déli), with other outlying stations like Kelenföld. Of the three, the Southern is the most modern but the Eastern and the Western are more decorative and architecturally interesting.

Other important railway stations countrywide include Szolnok (the most important railway intersection outside Budapest), Tiszai Railway Station in Miskolc and the stations of Pécs, Győr, Debrecen, Szeged and Székesfehérvár.

The only city with an underground railway system is Budapest with its Metro.

In Budapest, there is also a suburban rail service in and around the city, operated under the name HÉV.

=== Rail system ===
- Total: 7,606 km (4,726 mi)
  - Standard gauge: 7,394 km (4,594 mi) – 1,435 mm (4 ft 8 1/2 in) gauge (2,911 km electrified, and 1,236 km double-track)
  - Broad gauge: 36 km (22 mi) – 1,520 mm (4 ft 11 27/32 in) gauge
  - Narrow gauge: 176 km (109 mi) – 760 mm (2 ft 5 15/16 in) gauge (1998)

==== Rail links with adjacent countries ====
- Same gauge:
  - Austria (6 line)
  - Croatia (3 line)
  - Romania (5 line)
  - Serbia (2 line)
  - Slovakia (10 line)
  - Slovenia (1 line)
- Break-of-gauge – 1,435 mm (4 ft 8 1/2 in) / 1,520 mm (4 ft 11 27/32 in)
  - Ukraine (2 line)

== Airports ==
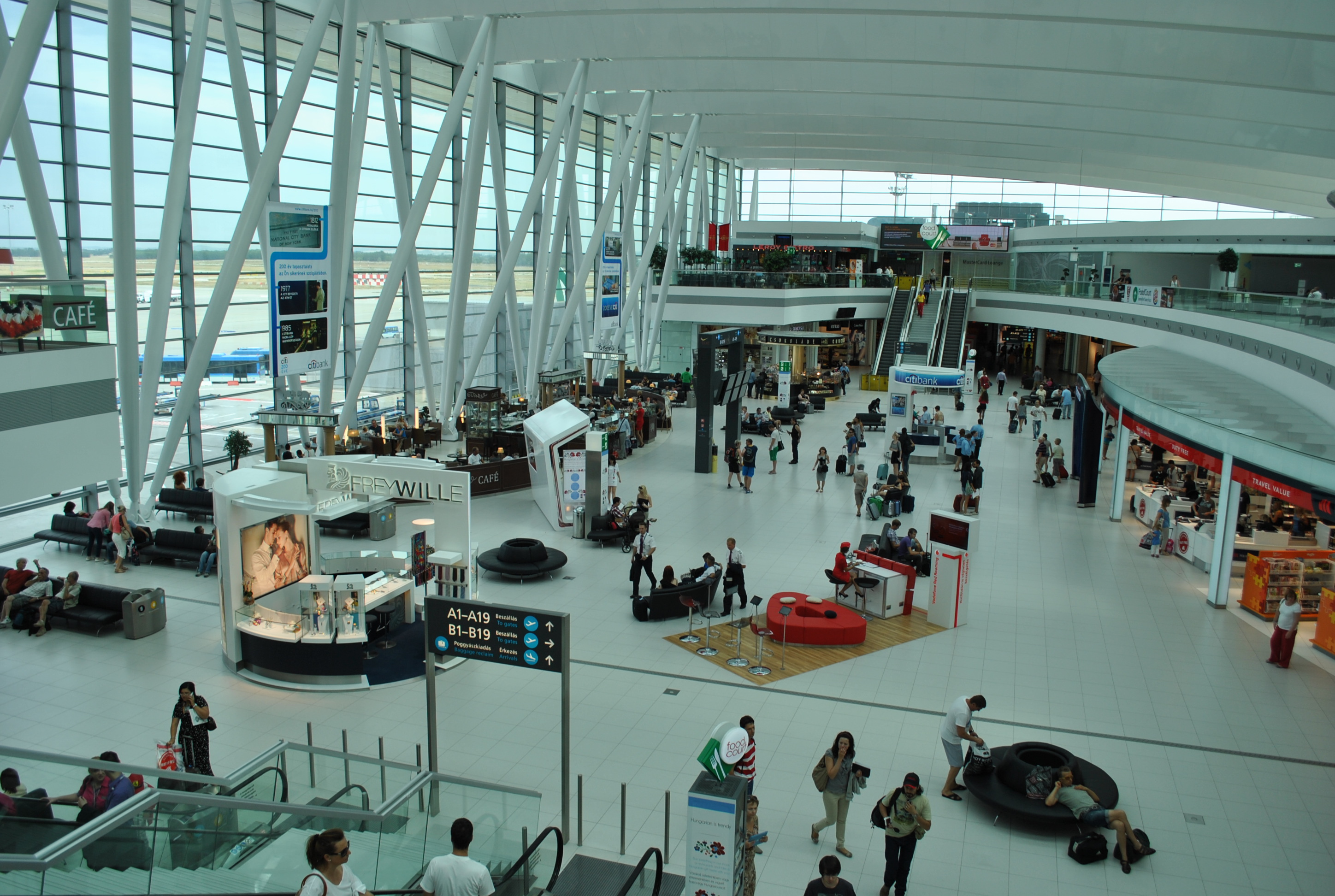
Budapest Liszt Ferenc International Airport inside of SkyCourt

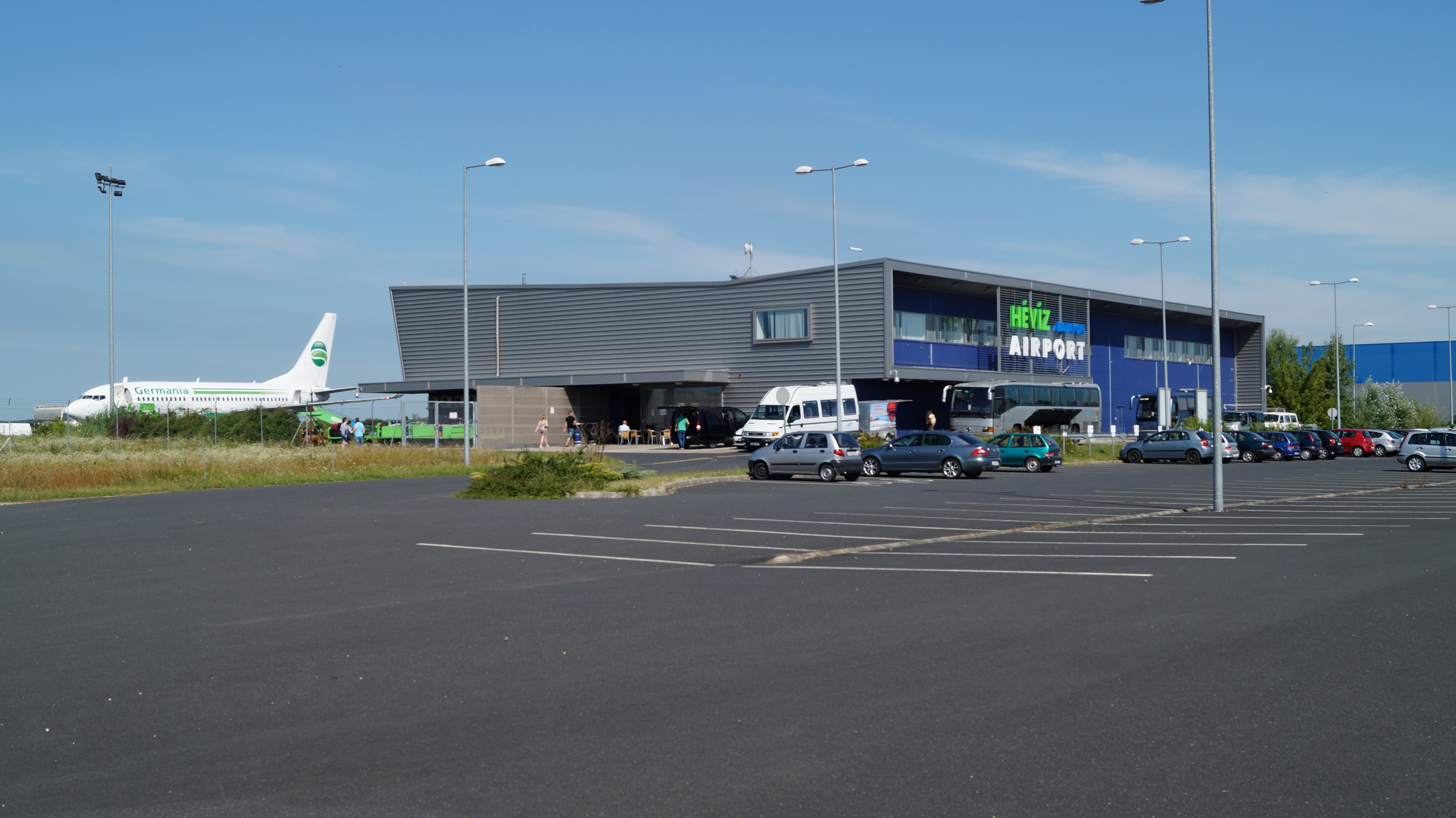
Hévíz–Balaton Airport - inside

There are 43-45 airports in Hungary, including smaller, unpaved airports, too. The five international airports are Budapest-Liszt Ferenc, Debrecen Airport, Hévíz–Balaton International Airport (previously Sármellék, also called FlyBalaton for its proximity to Lake Balaton, Hungary's number one tourist attraction), Győr-Pér and Pécs-Pogány (as of 2015. there are no regular passenger flights from Győr-Pér and Pécs-Pogány). Malév Hungarian Airlines ceased operations in 2012.

Airports with paved runways

Total: 20 (1999 est.)

- Over 3,047 m: 2
- 2,438 to 3,047 m: 8
- 1,524 to 2,437 m: 4
- 914 to 1,523 m: 1
- Under 914 m: 1

Airports with unpaved runways

Total: 27 (1999 est.)

- 2,438 to 3,047 m: 3
- 1,524 to 2,437 m: 5
- 914 to 1,523 m: 12
- Under 914 m: 7

=== International airports ===
List of airports in Hungary; The following are the largest airports in Hungary (In descending order for 2015):

- Budapest Ferenc Liszt International Airport (BUD)
- Debrecen International Airport (DEB)
- Hévíz–Balaton Airport (SOB)
- Győr-Pér International Airport (QGY)
- Pécs-Pogány International Airport (PEV)

=== Heliports ===
Hungary has five heliports.

== Waterways ==
1,373 km permanently navigable (1997)

=== Ports and harbors ===
The most important port is Budapest, the capital. Other important ones include Dunaújváros and Baja.

Ports on the Danube:

- Győr-Gönyű (Port of Győr)
- Komárom
- Budapest (Port of Csepel)
- Dunaújváros (Port of Dunaújváros)
- Dunavecse
- Madocsa
- Paks
- Fadd-Dombori
- Bogyiszló
- Baja (Port of Baja)
- Mohács (Port of Mohács)

Ports on the Tisza:

- Szeged (Port of Szeged)

=== Merchant marine ===
- Total: 2 ships (with a volume of 1,000 gross tonnage (GT) or over) totaling 12,949 GT/14,550 tonnes deadweight (DWT)
- Ships by type: cargo ship 2 (1999 est.)

== Transport in cities ==
=== Transport companies of cities ===
- BKK (Budapest) (buses, trams, trolley buses and metro)
- DKV Zrt. (Debrecen) (buses, trams & trolley buses)
- MVK Zrt. (Miskolc) (buses and trams)
- SzKT Kft. (Szeged) (trams and trolley buses only; buses belong to Volánbusz)
- Tüke Busz Zrt. (Pécs) (buses)
- KT Zrt. (Kaposvár) (buses)
- T-busz Kft. (Tatabánya) (buses)
- V-busz Kft. (Veszprém) (buses)
- KeKo (Kecskemét) (buses)

In the rest of the cities and towns local transport is provided by Volánbusz companies that also provide intercity bus lines.

=== Metro ===

The Budapest Metro (Hungarian: Budapesti metró) is the rapid transit system in the Hungarian capital Budapest. Its line 1 (opened in 1896) is the oldest electrified underground railway on the European continent. The second (red) line was opened in 1970, third (blue) line was opened in 1976, the newest line is the fourth (green), it was opened in 2014.

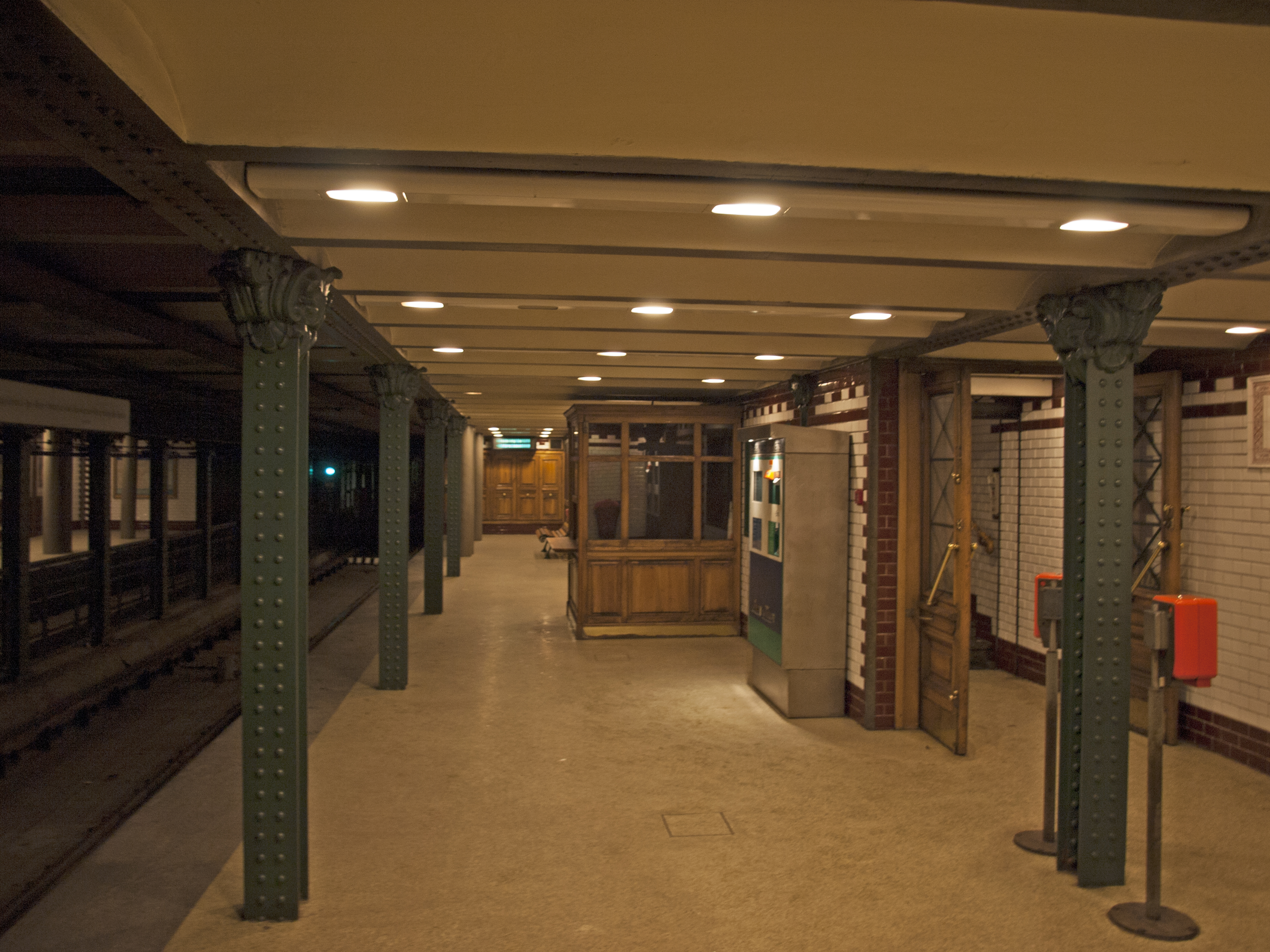
Bajza utca station, M1

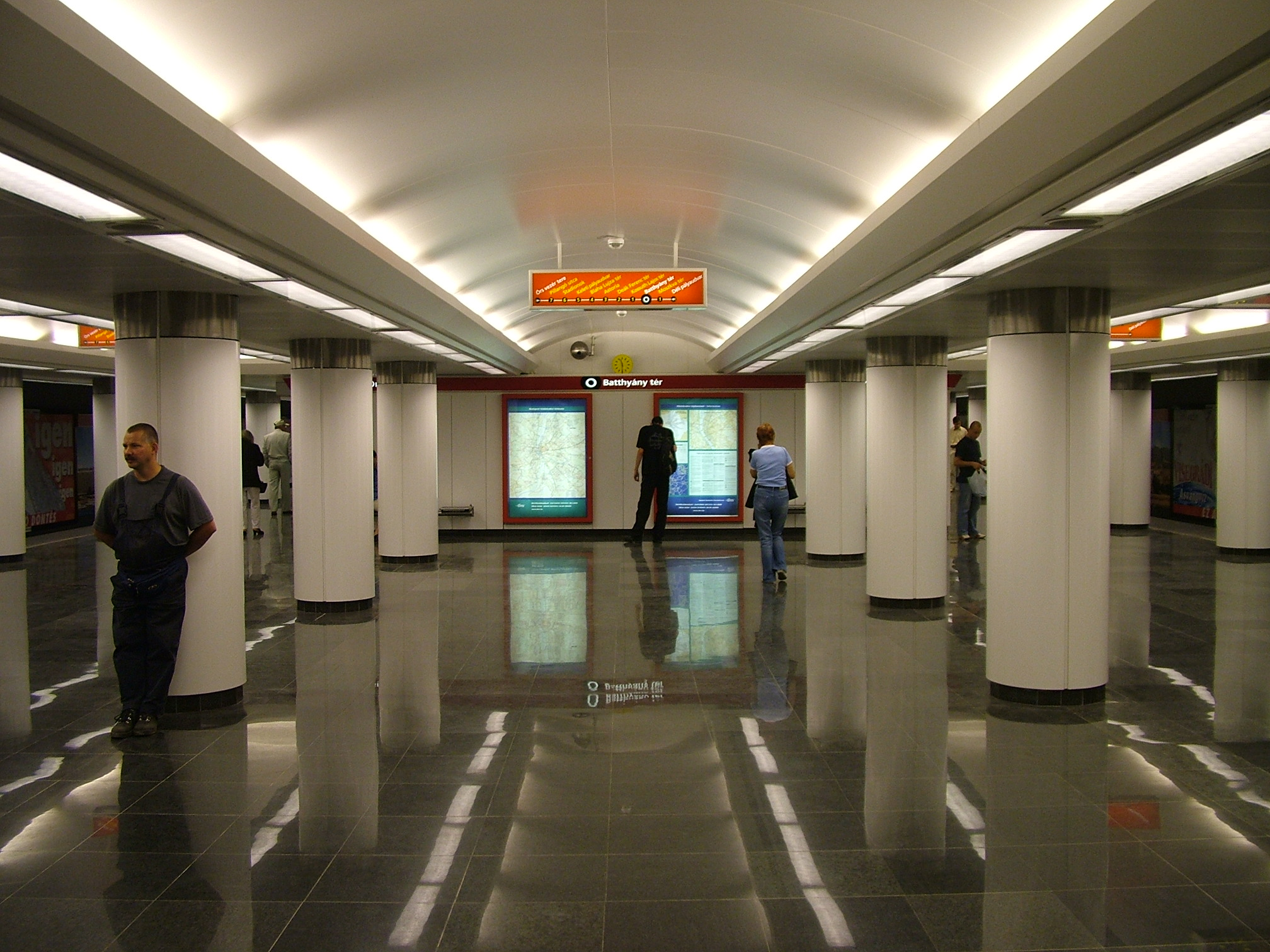
Batthyány tér, M2

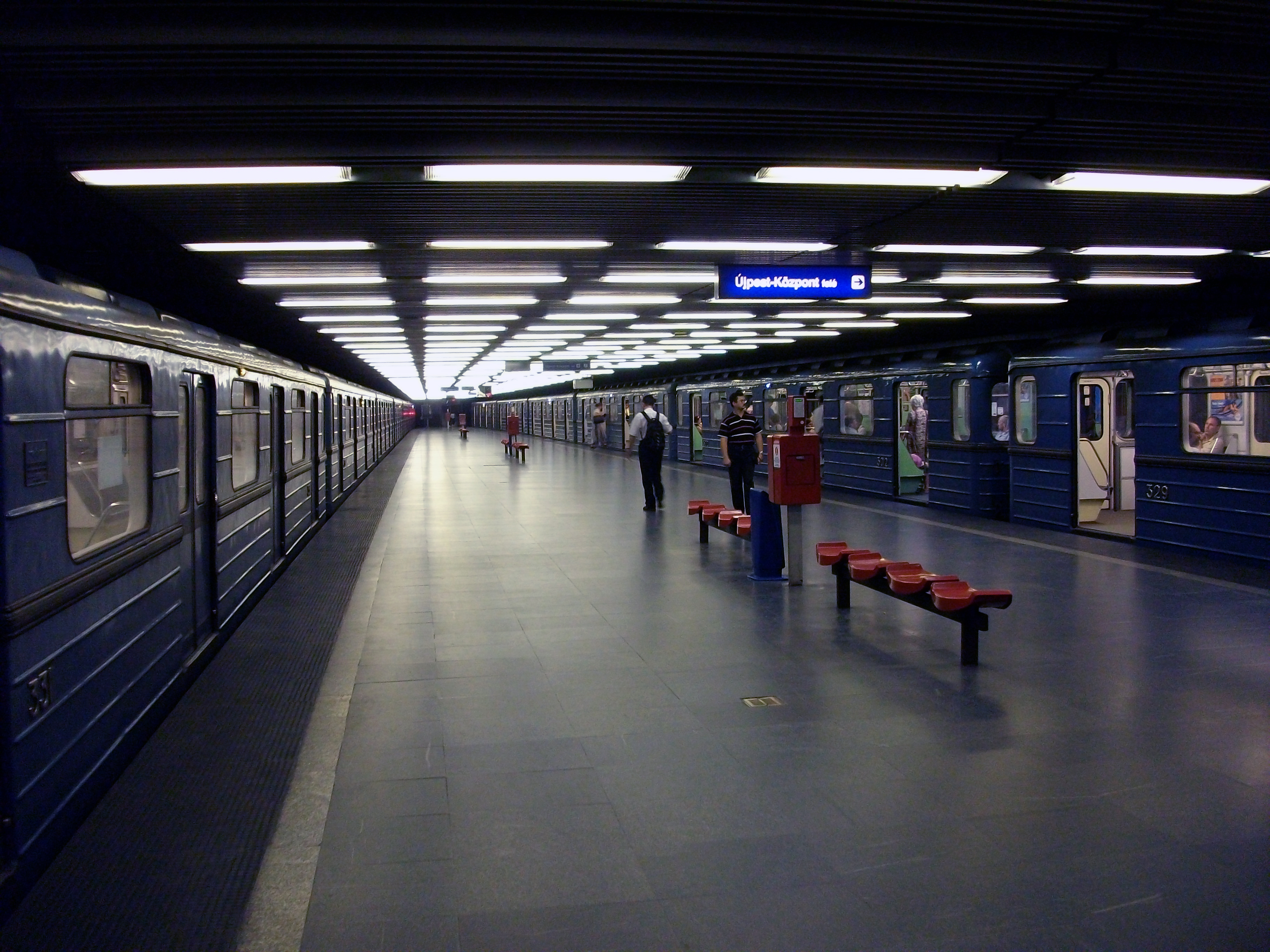
Határ út, M3

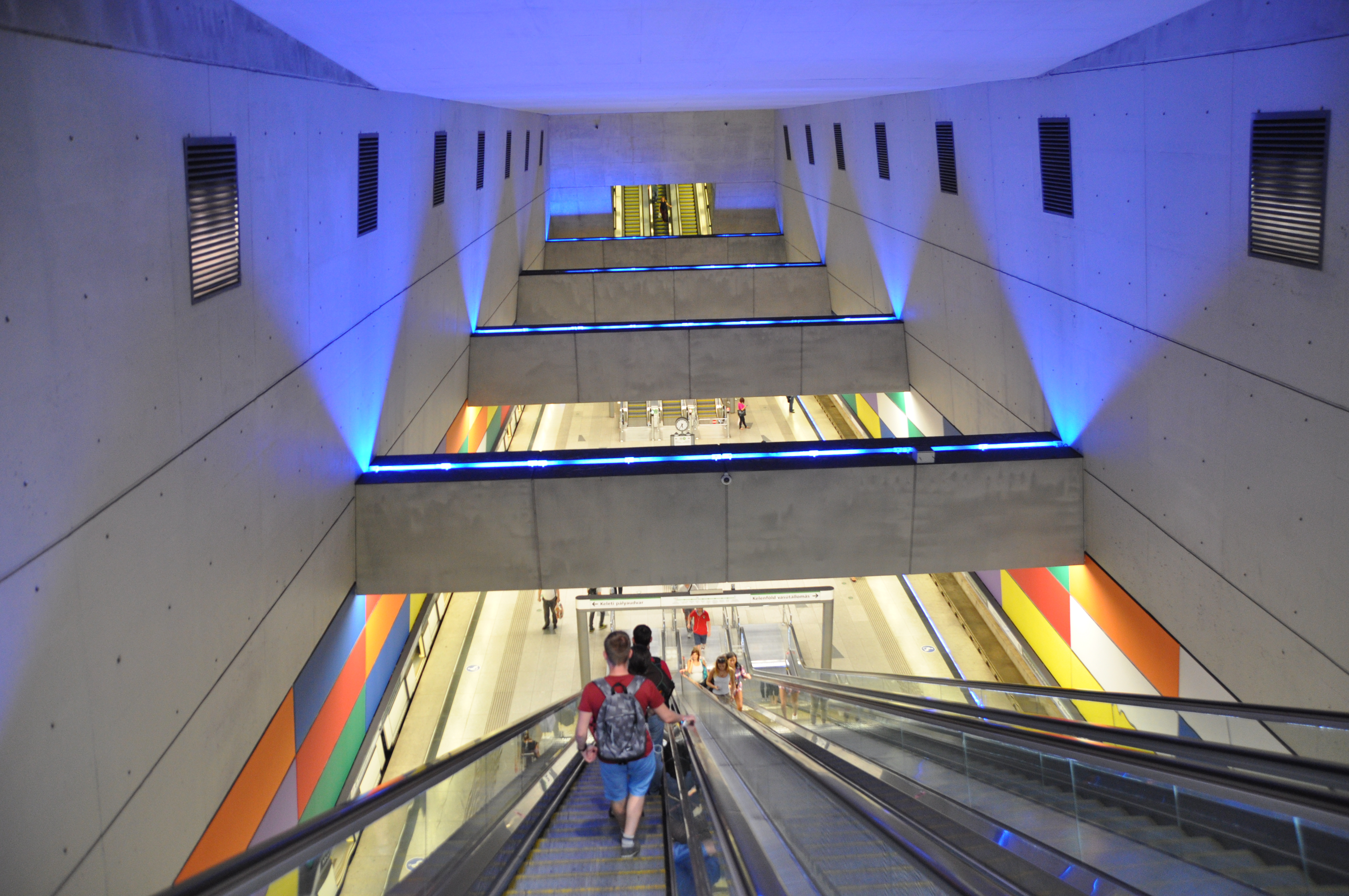
Móricz Zsigmond körtér, M4

=== Trams ===

The busiest traditional city tram line in the world is still route 4/6 in Budapest, where 50-meter long trams run at 120 to 180 second intervals at peak time and are usually packed with people. A part of this route is the same as where electric trams made their world first run in 1887. Since the 2000s, the Budapest tram network has been improved, by ordering new trams (Combino Supra and CAF Urbos 3) as well as extending some lines (such as line 1 to Kelenföld railway station).

==== Cities with tram lines ====
- Budapest (since November 28, 1887)
- Miskolc (since July 10, 1897)
- Szeged (since October 1, 1908)
- Debrecen (since March 16, 1911)
- Hódmezővásárhely (since November 29, 2021)

==== Cities with former tram lines ====
- Szombathely (1897–1974)
- Sopron (1900–1923)
- Nyíregyháza (1905–1969)
- Pécs (1913 – August 31, 1960)

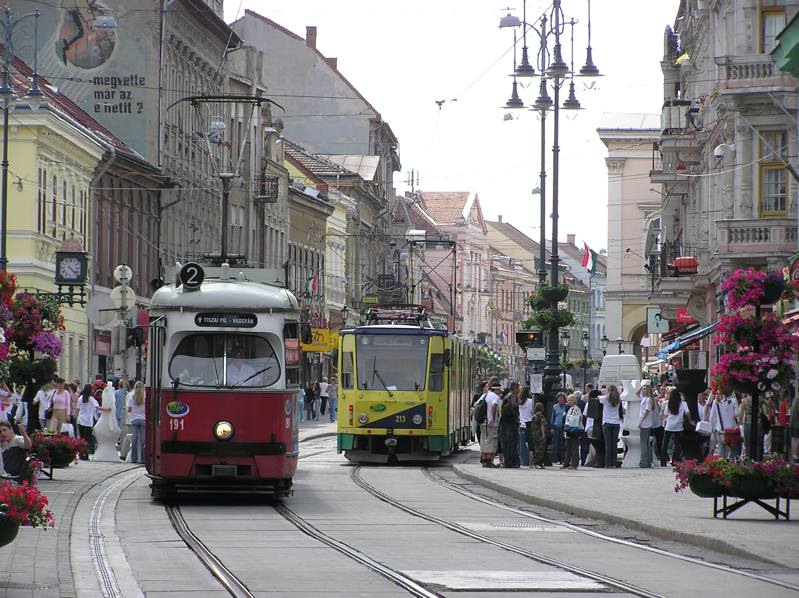
Trams in Miskolc

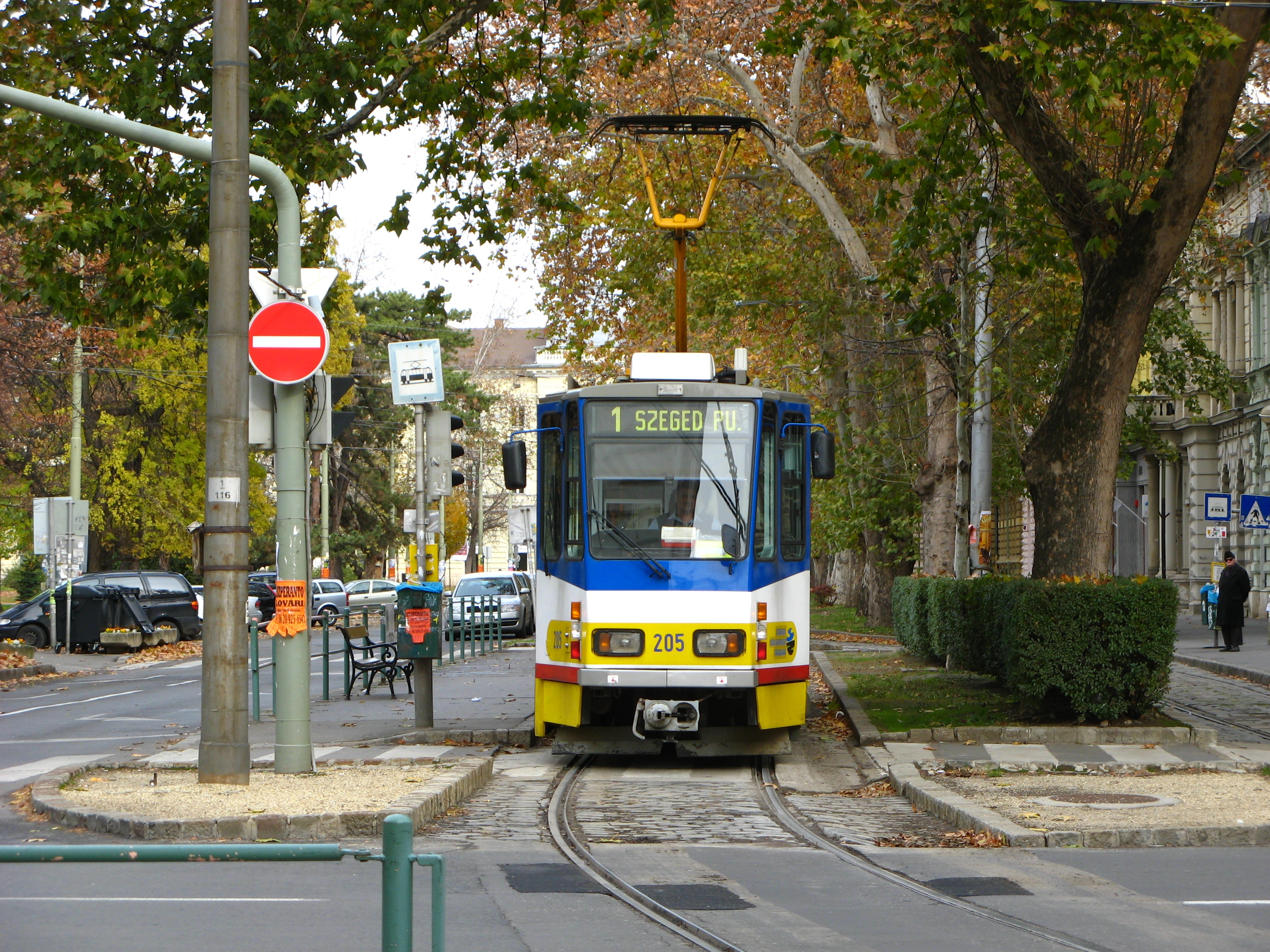
Trams in Szeged

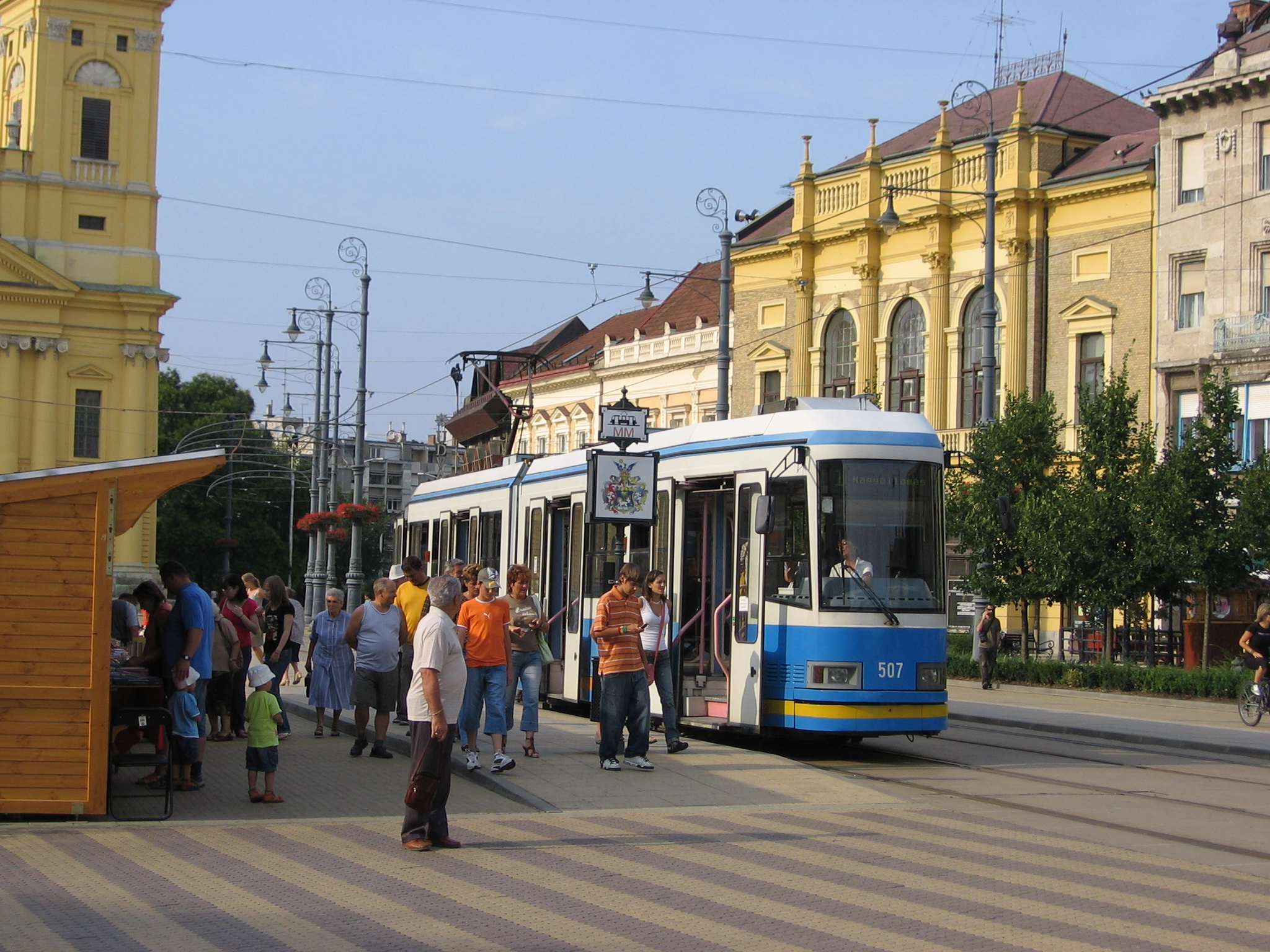
Trams in Debrecen

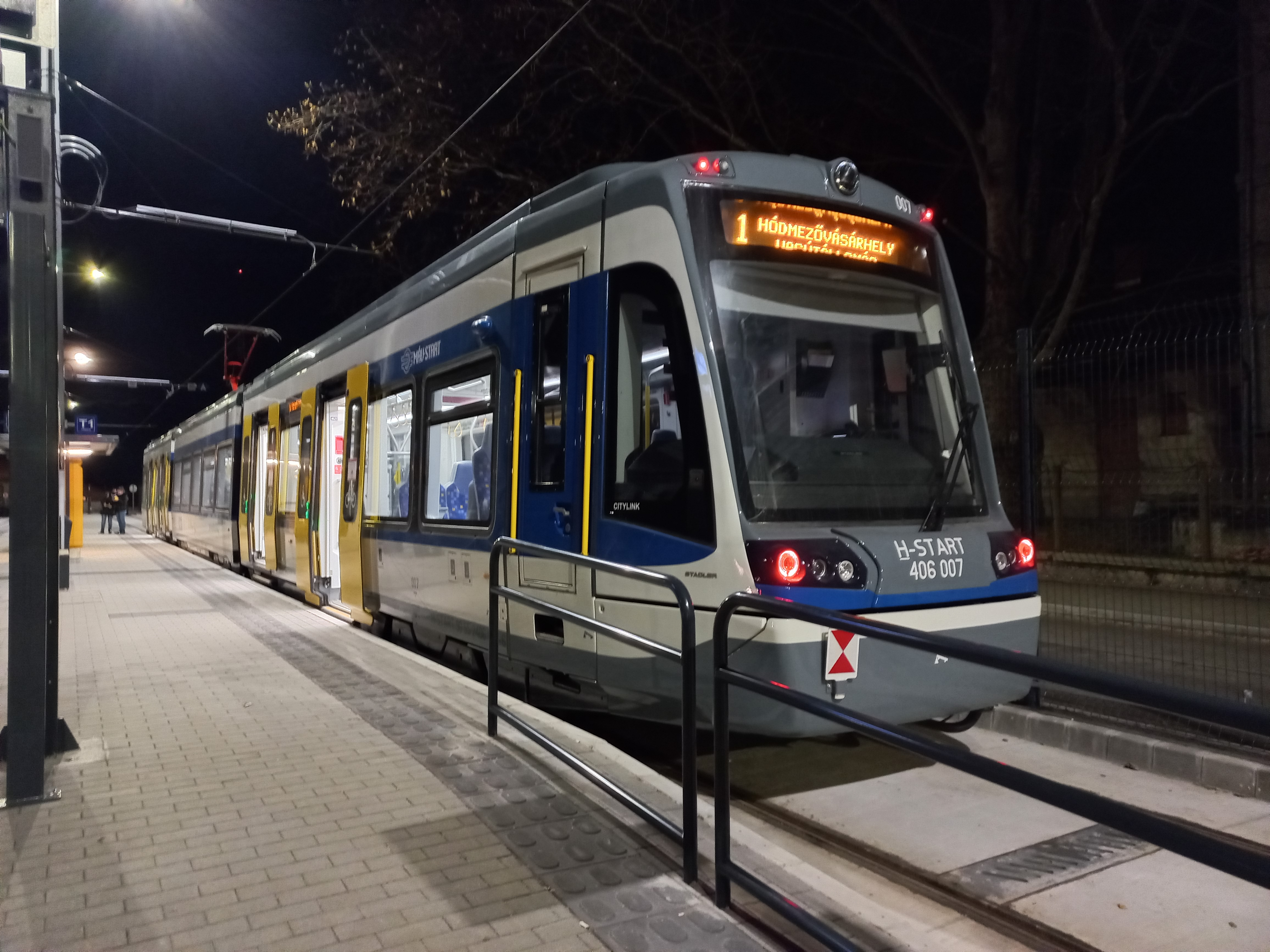
Szeged-Hódmezővásárhely Tram-train

There were some towns, where narrow-gauge railways were used as tram lines or interurban lines (for example: Sárospatak, Sátoraljaújhely, Békéscsaba, Békés, Cegléd). These lines were closed in the 1970s.

=== Trolleybus ===
Trolleybuses can be found in three cities: Budapest, Debrecen and Szeged.

== Pipelines ==
- Crude oil: 1,204 km
- Natural gas: 4,387 km (1991)

== See also ==
- Hungary
- Hungarian State Railways
- List of airports in Hungary
- List of motorways in Hungary
- Plug-in electric vehicles in Hungary
- Suburban railway lines in Budapest
