= Maszovlet Flight 381 =

Aviation accident

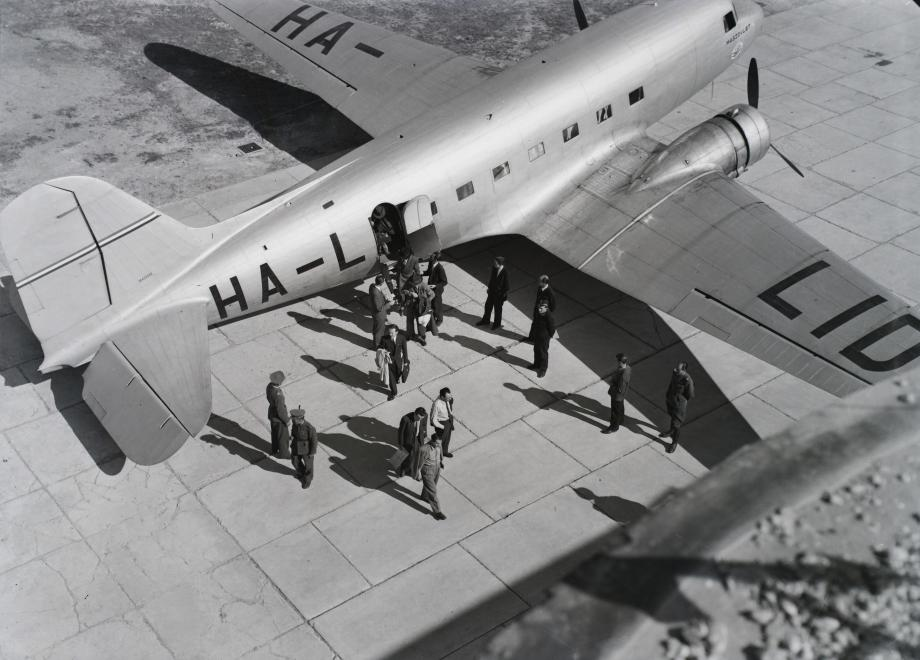
- A Maszovlet Lisunov Li-2P, similar to the one involved in the incident

Accident
- Date: November 14, 1949
- Summary: Controlled flight into terrain due to pilot error and loss of situational awareness
- Site: Jakab-hegy, Kővágószőlős, Hungarian People's Republic; 46°05′44″N 18°07′44″E

Aircraft
- Aircraft type: Lisunov Li-2P
- Operator: Maszovlet
- Registration: HA-LIK
- Flight origin: Budaörs Airport
- Destination: Pécs Airport
- Occupants: 7
- Passengers: 1
- Crew: 6
- Fatalities: 6
- Injuries: 1
- Survivors: 1

Maszovlet Flight 381 was a scheduled domestic passenger flight operated by Maszovlet, a Hungarian-Soviet joint venture, between Budaörs Airport and Pécs Airport. On November 14, 1949, the aircraft, a Lisunov Li-2P with registration number HA-LIK, crashed near Pécs, on the outskirts of Kővágószőlős. Of the seven people on board, only one survived the accident. This tragedy was the first disaster in Hungarian civil aviation after World War II.

== Flight ==
The flight took off from Budaörs Airport at 9:34 local time on November 14, 1949, on the scheduled Budapest–Pécs route, bound for Pécs Airport—which was then located near the city center, in what is now the Uránváros district, and has since closed— under the command of Captain Béla Molnár and First Officer József Bartos. On that day, only a single passenger had purchased a ticket for the aircraft, which could carry 21 passengers, in addition to the six-member crew. This was unusual, as the recently resumed domestic air service was very popular, and flights to Pécs were usually fully booked. In addition to the five-member flight crew, an officer from the State Protection Authority was on board, as, following a previous hijacking incident, every domestic flight had been escorted by a plainclothes State Protection Authority officer since 1949.

Weather conditions in the Pécs area were exceptionally poor that day, so air traffic controllers at Pécs Airport had already indicated that they could only accept aircraft capable of instrument flight. Visibility was approximately 4,000 meters. The air controllers of Pécs were not notified of the Maszovlet flight's arrival until around 10:00, but by then the weather had deteriorated further, visibility had dropped below 3,000 meters, and the mountains surrounding the airport were shrouded in fog. Despite all this, the airport did not issue a landing ban. The aircraft arrived at the outskirts of Pécs around 10:28, where they reported that they were flying at an altitude of 150 meters and that they would not need ground-based guidance. However, they missed their first attempt at the turn, so at 10:31 the aircraft requested that the guidance system be activated, which was done. The aircraft was flying in clouds at the time, with visibility practically zero. They climbed about 300 meters and, instead of a left turn, began their approach with a wide right turn at 450 meters. They were unable to complete the maneuver: the pilots noticed the mountainside of Jakab Mountain looming ahead of them too late, so the plane crashed nose-first into the mountain and was destroyed, its burning debris covering the entire mountainside. The explosion following the crash could be heard as far away as the nearby village of Kővágószőlős, from where locals were the first to rush to the scene. A total of six people lost their lives in the disaster: the five-member crew and the sole passenger. The only survivor of the accident was Lajos Tóth, the escort from the State Protection Authority, who was seated in the rear of the aircraft.

== Aircraft ==
The aircraft was a one-year-old Lisunov Li-2P built in 1948 at the Chkalov Mechanical Plant in Tashkent, Soviet Uzbekistan. It was transferred to Hungary that same year, joining the fleet of the newly established Maszovlet, where it flew as a 21-seat passenger aircraft under the registration number HA-LIK. By the end of 1948, it had flown a total of 225 hours and made 142 takeoffs.

=== Passengers and crew ===
The six-member crew consisted of the captain, first officer, radio operator, engineer, an apprentice engineer, and the security officer. The sole passenger was named Endre Reiter.

== Aftermath ==
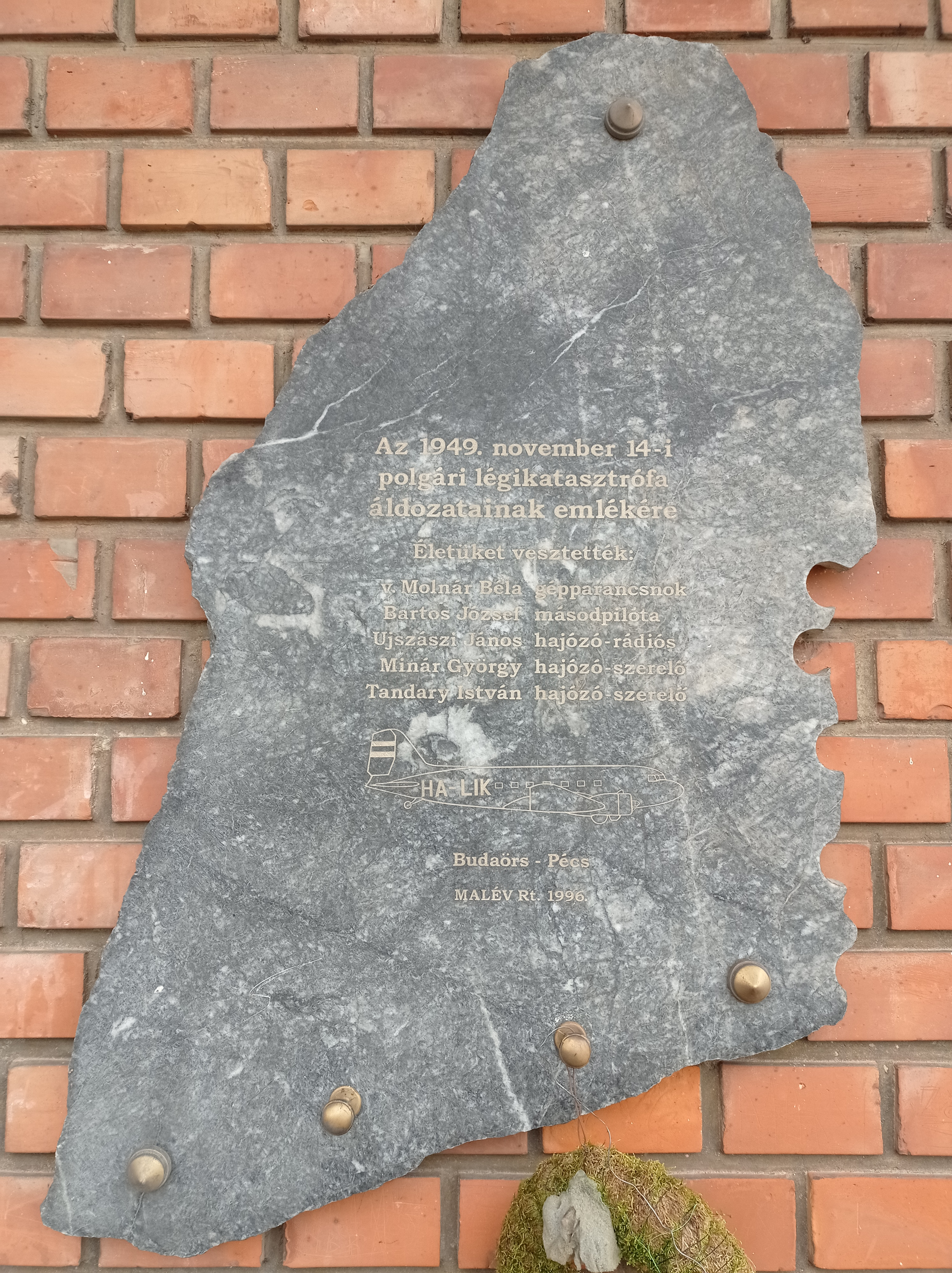
A commemorative plaque at the site of the former Pécs Airport

Due to the state censorship typical of the Rákosi era, the press reported on the disaster only very sparingly. Two days later, local daily newspaper Dunántúli Napló reported on the incident in a six-line news item at the bottom of page 2, while one of the newspaper's lead stories was that a 15-member Soviet construction delegation was arriving in the country. The State Protection Authority, where the sole survivor, Lajos Tóth, worked, forbade him from speaking publicly about the accident. He was later allowed to visit the villagers in Kővágószőlős and thank them for rescuing him from the wreckage, but even then, two of his colleagues were there to monitor what he said to them.

In memory of the victims, a memorial plaque was erected in 1996 in Pécs at the site of the former airport, on the wall of the building at 7 Építők Road.
