= Nyíregyháza Airport =

Civil airport in Szabolcs-Szatmár-Bereg, Hungary

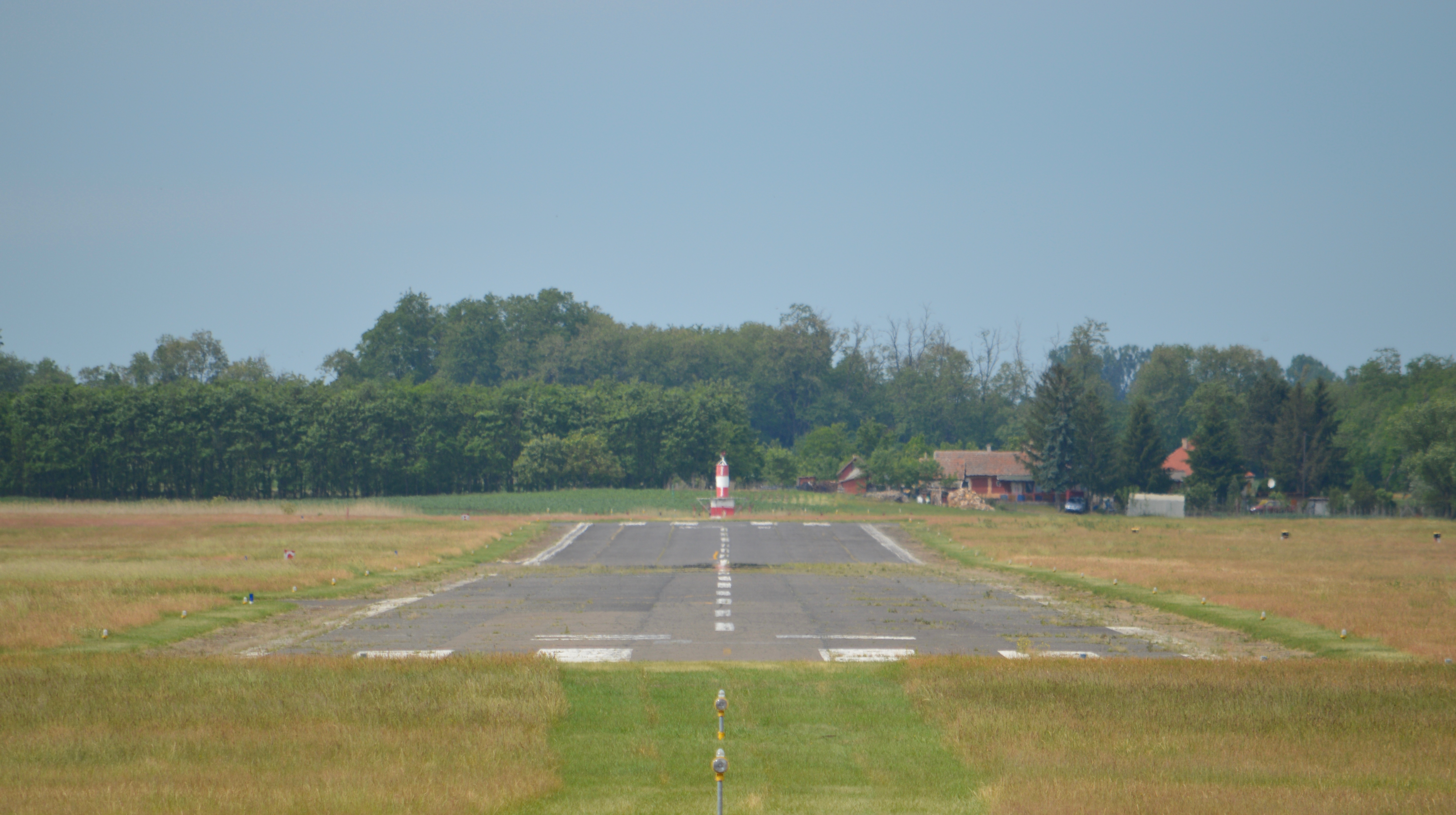
- The runway
- IATA: none; ICAO: LHNY

Summary
- Airport type: Public
- Serves: Nyíregyháza, Hungary
- Elevation AMSL: 338 ft (103 m)
- Coordinates: 47°59′02″N 021°41′32″E
- Website: trenerkft.hu

Map
- Location of airport in Hungary

Runways
Direction	Length		Surface
Direction	m	ft	Surface
18R/36L	1,000	3,281	Asphalt
18L/36R	1,000	3,281	Grass
- Source: DAFIF

Nyíregyháza Airport (ICAO: LHNY) is a small civil airport serving Nyíregyháza, a city in Szabolcs-Szatmár-Bereg county, Hungary.

== Facilities ==
The airport resides at an elevation of 338 feet (103 m) above mean sea level. It has two runways: 18R/36L has an asphalt pavement measuring 1,000 by 20 metres (3,281 ft × 66 ft) and 18L/36R has a grass surface measuring 1,000 by 60 metres (3,281 ft × 197 ft).

The airport is the home base of Tréner Ltd, a Hungarian pilot training organization which together with the University of Nyíregyháza (responsible for theoretical training) provides ATPL integrated courses and a professional airline pilot degree.

== Airlines and destinations ==
Between 1948 and 1963, the airport served the then-frequent domestic flights operated by Maszovlet and its successor Malév. Apart from a short-lived attempt in 1990, which tried to restart domestic flights within Hungary with a Nyíregyháza-Budaörs Airport route, there have been no scheduled flights to or from the airport since then.

== Statistics ==
Year	Passengers	Change
2009	31 345	n/a
2010	29 591	−5.59%
2011	13 488	−54.42%
2012	17 137	+27.05%
2013	15 863	−7.43%
2014	7 840	−50.57%
2015	27 320	+248.47%
2016	34 313	+25.59%

== Accidents ==
The second of two accidents of Maszovlet took place at this airport. On 2 October 1952, an Li-2 (HA-LIL) was flying the Budapest–Miskolc–Nyíregyháza–Budapest route. Due to poor weather conditions, the landing in Miskolc succeeded only at the third attempt, yet the crew decided to continue the flight towards Nyíregyháza, where after several landing attempts the plane landed on slippery grass and crashed into a building. Three crew members, including the pilot and the co-pilot, died, two other crew members and the three passengers suffered severe injuries.
