= Plug-in electric vehicles in Hungary =

As of March 2023, there were 70,000 electric vehicles registered in Hungary, including 38,000 fully electric vehicles. As of 2022, 5.5% of new cars sold in Hungary were fully electric, and 4.8% were plug-in hybrid.

As of 2022, the Tesla Model 3 was the best-selling electric car in Hungary.

== Charging stations ==
As of September 2022, there were 3,579 public charging stations in Hungary.

== By county ==
=== Budapest ===
As of August 2024, the Budapest municipal government offers free parking citywide for electric cars.

=== Hajdú-Bihar ===
Initially, parking for electric cars was free in Debrecen; however, this ended on 1 January 2023. From this date parking is free for local residents only.
