= Debrecen International Airport =

Debrecen International Airport Debrecen Nemzetközi Repülőtér
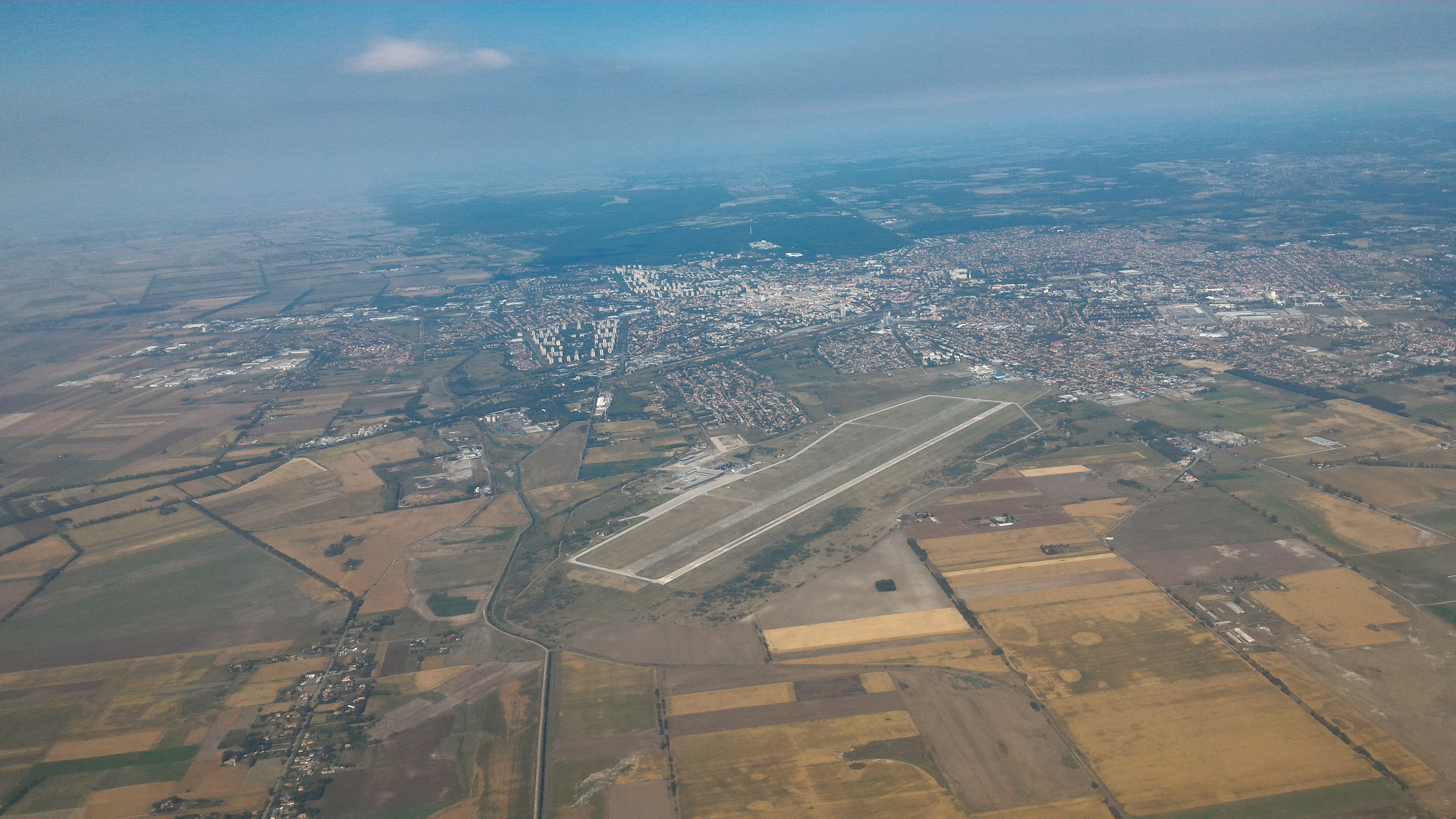
- IATA: DEB; ICAO: LHDC

Summary
- Operator: Debrecen International Airport Kft.
- Serves: Debrecen, Hungary
- Elevation AMSL: 110 m (360 ft)
- Coordinates: 47°29′20″N 021°36′55″E
- Website: debrecenairport.com

Map
- Location of the airport in Hungary

Runways
Direction	Length		Surface
Direction	m	ft	Surface
04R/22L	2,500	8,202	Concrete

Helipads
Number	Length		Surface
Number	m	ft	Surface
H1	40	131	Asphalt

Statistics (2023)
- Passengers: 306 095
- Passenger change 2022–2023: ▲23.30%
- Source: Hungarian AIP at EUROCONTROL

Debrecen International Airport (IATA: DEB, ICAO: LHDC) is the international airport of Debrecen in the Hajdú-Bihar County of Hungary. It is the second largest airport in Hungary, after Budapest and ahead of Hévíz–Balaton. Debrecen is the second largest city in Hungary, after Budapest and ahead of Szeged. DEB is located 5 km (3.1 mi) south southwest of the city center and also easily accessible to adjacent regions of Romania and Ukraine.

== History ==
=== Foundation and early years ===
The history of Debrecen Airport goes back to the early 20th Century. The first official regular flight carrying mail took off in 1930. Subsequently, the airport served sport and military purposes. From 1930, it had remarkable domestic traffic serving flights from Debrecen to Budapest and to other major cities in Hungary. During World War II it was the base of a Hungarian bombing squad.

Between 1946 and 1968, Debrecen Airport functioned also as an emergency airfield for Budapest Airport. Following World War II, the Soviet air force had control over the airport until 1990. One of the last Soviet units at the airfield appears to have been the 727th Guards Bomber Aviation Regiment, which left in 1987. The political transition brought the revival of the airport and international civilian traffic was launched together with sports aviation.

In May 1991, Soviet troops vacated the airport and handed it over to the Hungarian government. In 1994, the Debrecen Municipal Government realized the need to develop the airport and included it in its development plan. The city purchased the airport and has been steadily developing it.

=== Development since 2000 ===
By 2004, the city of Debrecen had invested 3.5 billion forints to purchase, operate, and continually develop Debrecen Airport.

On 18 June 2012, Wizz Air launched its scheduled service between Debrecen and London-Luton, initially with 3 weekly flights. In 2012–2013, Tatarstan Airlines operated a bi-weekly flight to Moscow-Domodedovo. After the disaster of Tatarstan Airlines Flight 363 which forced Tatarstan Airlines into bankruptcy, the route was taken over by UTair Aviation. In 2014, due to souring Russia–European Union relations, a number of punitive sanctions were implemented vice versa that forced UTair to cancel the flight.

In 2015, Wizz Air established a cadet pilot school at the airport under the company Pharma-Flight Kft which also researches and produces pharmaceutical products for flight staff. Wizz Air in 2015 announced they would base one Airbus A320 at Debrecen.

The construction of a new "innovation and incubation centre" at the airport which would host the new terminal on its ground floor began in June 2015. and scheduled to open in 2017.

In July 2024, Wizz Air announced it would close its Debrecen base by October 2024, leading to the cancellation of most routes.

== Airlines and destinations ==
The following airlines operate regular year-round and seasonal services at the airport:

Airlines	Destinations
Israir	Tel Aviv
Lufthansa	Munich
Smartwings	Seasonal charter: Antalya, Barcelona, Chania, Heraklion, Monastir, Tirana
Tailwind Airlines	Antalya
Wizz Air	Eindhoven, Istanbul, London–Luton, Tel Aviv (suspended); Seasonal: Larnaca, Varna

== Statistics ==
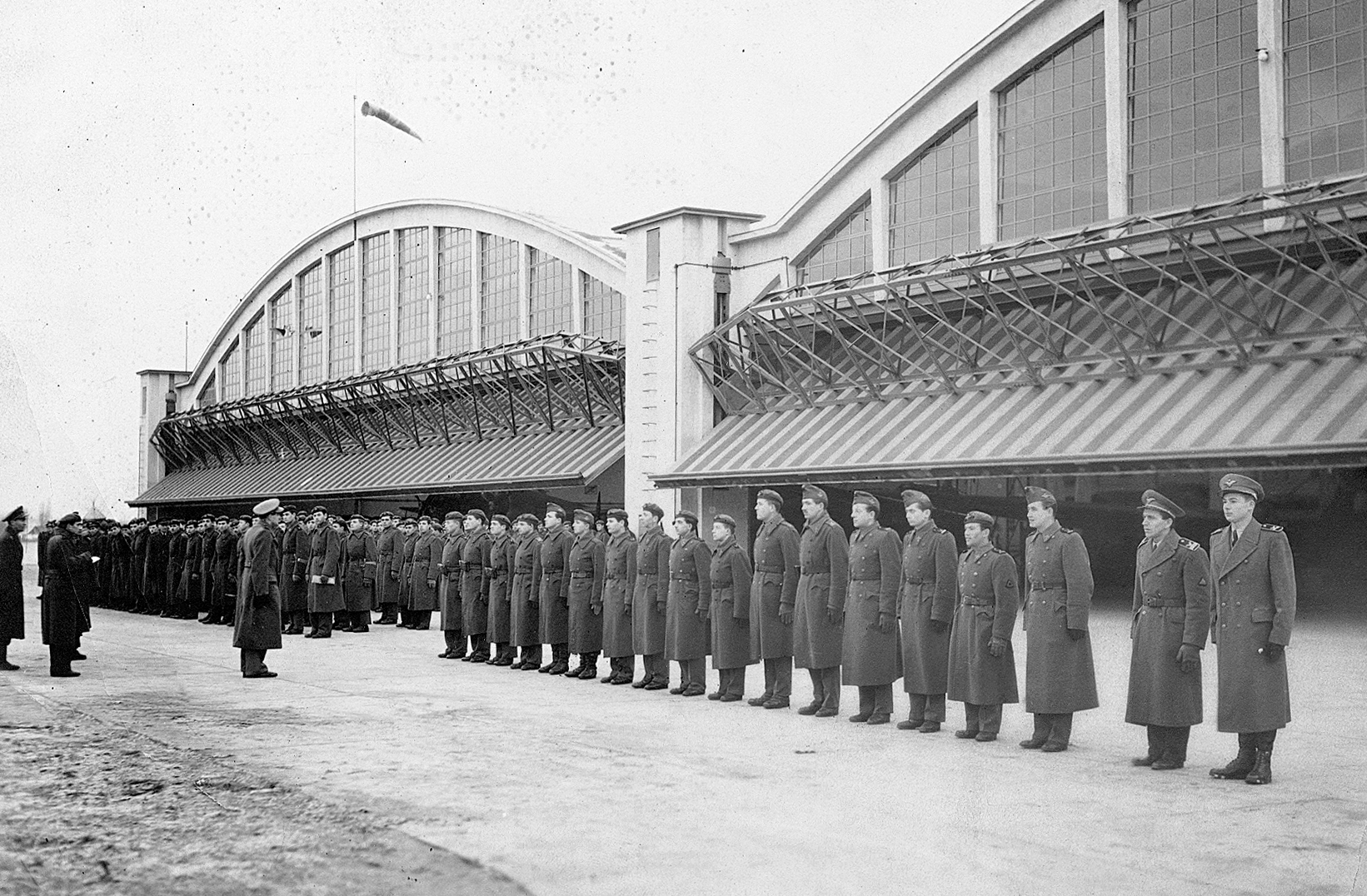
Members of the Royal Hungarian Air Force at Debrecen Airport, 1940

=== Top destinations ===
Busiest routes (2019)
Rank	Airport	Passengers handled 2018/19
1	London-Luton	154,819
2	Eindhoven	48,743
3	Tel Aviv	44,671
4	Paris-Beauvais	44,154
5	Dortmund	38,234
6	Barcelona	33,801
7	Doncaster/Sheffield	32,703
8	Moscow-Vnukovo	31,659
9	Milan-Malpensa	30,562
10	Basel/Mulhouse	28,769

=== Annual passenger numbers ===
	Passengers handled (Note: Number of passengers including domestic, international and transit)	Passenger % Change
2004	21,476	n/a
2005	42,119	128.78% ▲
2006	58,939	11.53% ▲
2007	61,900	16.13% ▲
2008	72,650	−0.58% ▼
2009	89,060	−41.24% ▼
2010	104,415	−2.57% ▼
2011	129,135	−21.62% ▼
2012	157,746	149.52% ▲
2013	184,231	170.66% ▲
2014	208,709	12.75% ▲
2015	231,212	18.19% ▲
2016	259,965	65.47% ▲
2017	318,342	11,01% ▲
2018	421,391	19.87% ▲
2019	601,236	57.64% ▲
2020	-	-79.58% ▼
2021	75.000	-38.31% ▼
2022	248.252	229.45% ▲
2023	306,095	22.72% ▲
Source: KSH, OpenPR

== Ground transportation ==
=== Bus ===
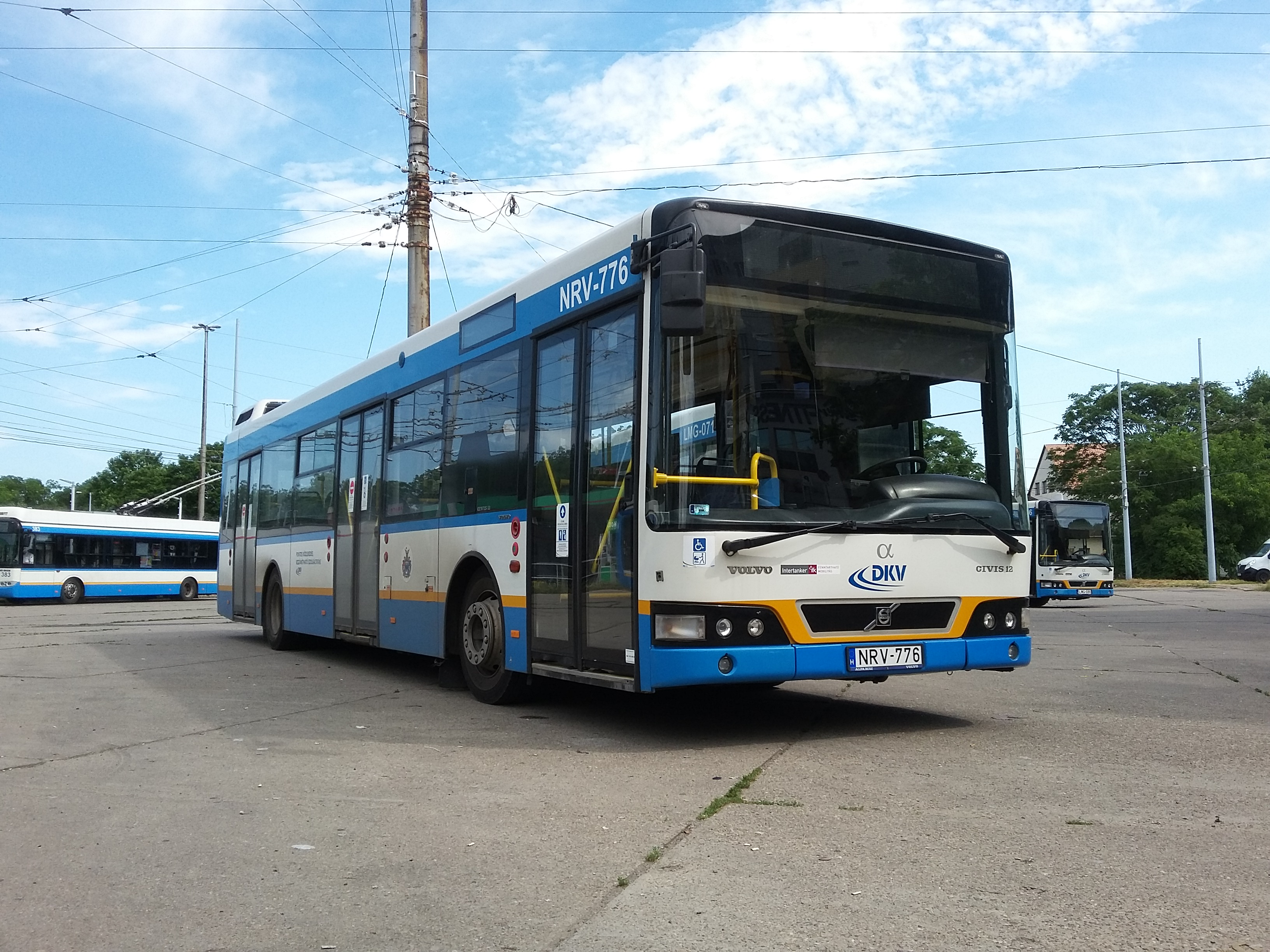
DKV Bus

Buses Airport1 and Airport2 are operated by the local public transport company, called Debreceni Közlekedési Vállalat (DKV). Airport1 runs between the airport and the main train station of Debrecen, where connections are available to local, regional and international buses, trams and trains, while Airport2 runs between the Airport and the northern end of the city. The schedule of the buses are matched with the departure and arrival times of the planes at the airport, serving all inbound and outbound flights and can be used with any of the regular DKV tickets or passes.

A direct bus connection was established in March 2016 between Nagyvárad (Oradea) and Debrecen International Airport. The schedule is matched with the arrival and departure times of the planes.

=== Train ===
The airport has a recently reconstructed direct rail connection, but it is used for freight moving only. It will be made suitable for passenger traffic only if there is a reasonable demand for the construction sometime in the future.

== See also ==
- List of airports in Hungary
- Transport in Hungary
- Budapest Ferenc Liszt International Airport
