= Miskolc Airfield =

Miskolc Airport Miskolci repülőtér
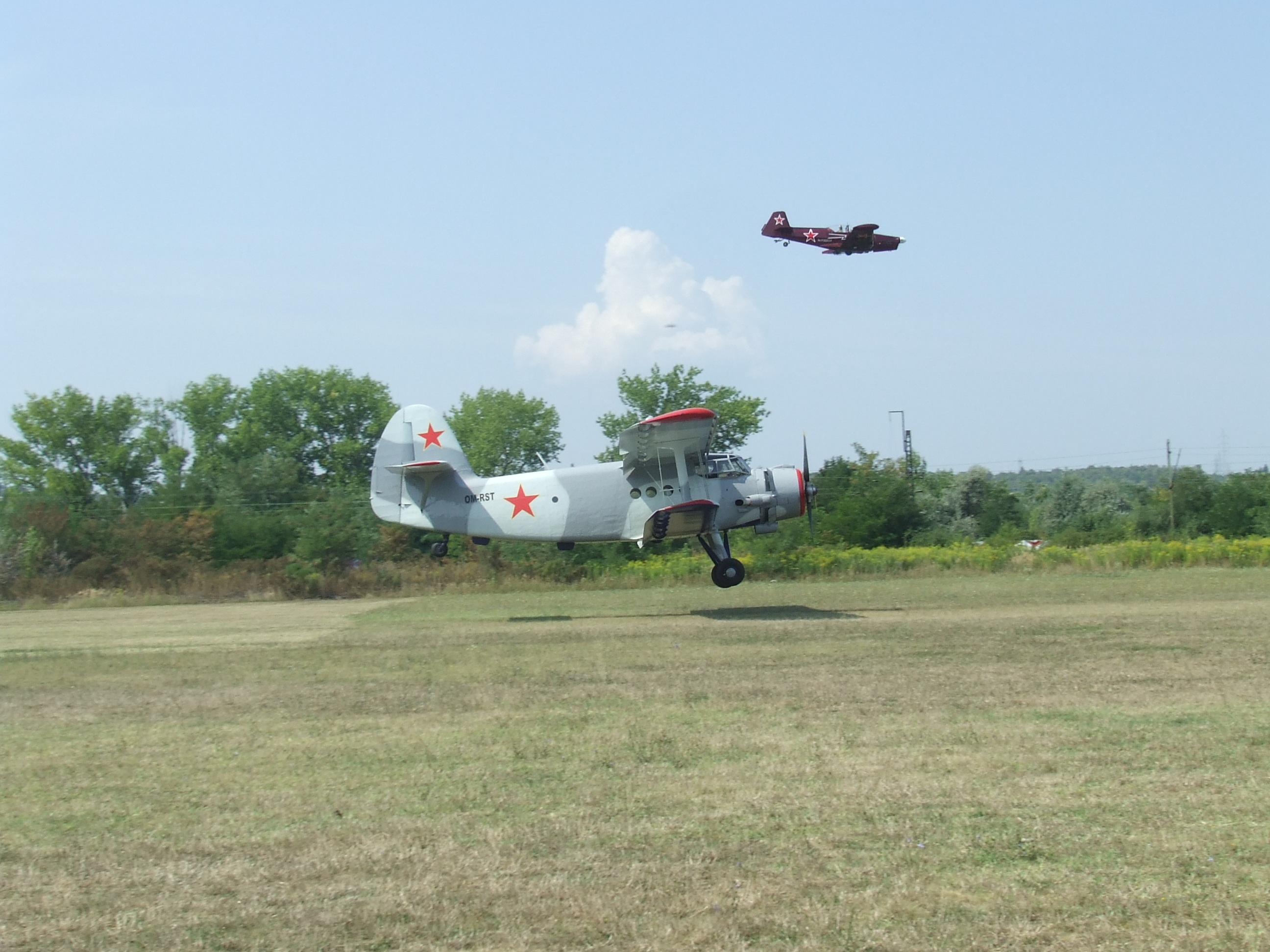
- Planes during take-off at Miskolc Airport
- IATA: MCQ; ICAO: LHMC

Summary
- Airport type: Private
- Operator: Borsod County Flight Club
- Serves: Miskolc, Borsod-Abaúj-Zemplén County, Hungary
- Elevation AMSL: 119 m / 390 ft
- Coordinates: 48°08′16″N 020°47′24″E
- Website: http://www.lhmc.hu/ (hu)

Map
- Location of the airport in Hungary

Runways
Direction	Length		Surface
Direction	m	ft	Surface
16L/34R	800	2,625	Grass

Miskolc Airfield (Hungarian: Miskolci repülőtér) (IATA: MCQ, ICAO: LHMC) was a small unpaved aerodrome in Miskolc, in the Borsod-Abaúj-Zemplén County of Hungary. It operated regular domestic flights until 1967, then served general aviation (gliding, parachuting, sightseeing) until 2022. Now it is a closed private airport unused.

== See also ==
- List of airports in Hungary
