= Pér =

- Flag Coat of arms

- Location of Győr-Moson-Sopron county in Hungary

- Location of Pér
- Coordinates: 47.61305°N 17.80106°E
- Country: Hungary
- County: Győr-Moson-Sopron

Area
  - Total: 31.48 km^{2} (12.15 sq mi)

Population (2019)
  - Total: 2,577
  - Density: 75.79/km^{2} (196.3/sq mi)
- Time zone: UTC+1 (CET)
  - Summer (DST): UTC+2 (CEST)
- Postal code: 9099
- Area code: 96

Pér is a village in Győr-Moson-Sopron county, Hungary.

This settlement of the south-eastern part of the Bakony-Kisalföld reaches the valley of the Győr Székesfehérvár and can be accessed via the M81 highway. The main city Győr can be found 15 km northwest. Pér has an average altitude of 132 meters.

== Climate ==
Pér's climate is classified as oceanic climate (Köppen Cfb). The annual average temperature is 10.7 °C (51.3 °F), the hottest month in July is 21.2 °C (70.2 °F), and the coldest month is 0.0 °C (32.0 °F) in January. The annual precipitation is 555.1 millimetres (21.85 in), of which July is the wettest with 66.8 millimetres (2.63 in), while February is the driest with only 25.4 millimetres (1.00 in). The extreme temperature throughout the year ranged from −22.0 °C (−7.6 °F) on 28 December 1996, to 40.1 °C (104.2 °F) on 8 August 2013.

Climate data for Pér, 1991−2020 normals
Month	Jan	Feb	Mar	Apr	May	Jun	Jul	Aug	Sep	Oct	Nov	Dec	Year
Record high °C (°F)	17.4 (63.3)	20.4 (68.7)	23.1 (73.6)	30.0 (86.0)	32.0 (89.6)	35.9 (96.6)	39.6 (103.3)	40.1 (104.2)	32.9 (91.2)	27.6 (81.7)	22.8 (73.0)	17.6 (63.7)	40.1 (104.2)
Mean daily maximum °C (°F)	3.3 (37.9)	5.8 (42.4)	11.2 (52.2)	17.2 (63.0)	21.6 (70.9)	25.4 (77.7)	27.5 (81.5)	27.5 (81.5)	22.0 (71.6)	16.1 (61.0)	9.5 (49.1)	4.0 (39.2)	15.9 (60.6)
Daily mean °C (°F)	0.0 (32.0)	1.7 (35.1)	5.8 (42.4)	11.2 (52.2)	15.7 (60.3)	19.4 (66.9)	21.2 (70.2)	20.7 (69.3)	15.9 (60.6)	10.6 (51.1)	5.6 (42.1)	1.0 (33.8)	10.7 (51.3)
Mean daily minimum °C (°F)	−3.3 (26.1)	−2.3 (27.9)	0.8 (33.4)	4.8 (40.6)	9.2 (48.6)	13.1 (55.6)	14.6 (58.3)	14.2 (57.6)	10.2 (50.4)	5.8 (42.4)	2.3 (36.1)	−1.9 (28.6)	5.6 (42.1)
Record low °C (°F)	−18.6 (−1.5)	−21.0 (−5.8)	−20.3 (−4.5)	−6.9 (19.6)	−2.6 (27.3)	3.0 (37.4)	5.6 (42.1)	4.9 (40.8)	−0.7 (30.7)	−9.8 (14.4)	−12.2 (10.0)	−22.0 (−7.6)	−22.0 (−7.6)
Average precipitation mm (inches)	31.5 (1.24)	25.4 (1.00)	33.9 (1.33)	34.5 (1.36)	62.4 (2.46)	55.5 (2.19)	66.8 (2.63)	59.1 (2.33)	59.1 (2.33)	46.1 (1.81)	44.1 (1.74)	36.7 (1.44)	555.1 (21.85)
Average precipitation days (≥ 1.0 mm)	6.8	6.0	6.9	5.8	8.4	7.1	7.4	6.4	6.9	6.9	7.4	6.6	82.6
Average relative humidity (%)	84.4	79.1	71.9	65.6	69.9	69.2	67.4	69.4	74.8	80.4	85.3	85.9	75.3
Source: NOAA
