= Siófok-Kiliti Airfield =

Siófok-Kiliti Airfield Siófok-Kiliti Repülőtér
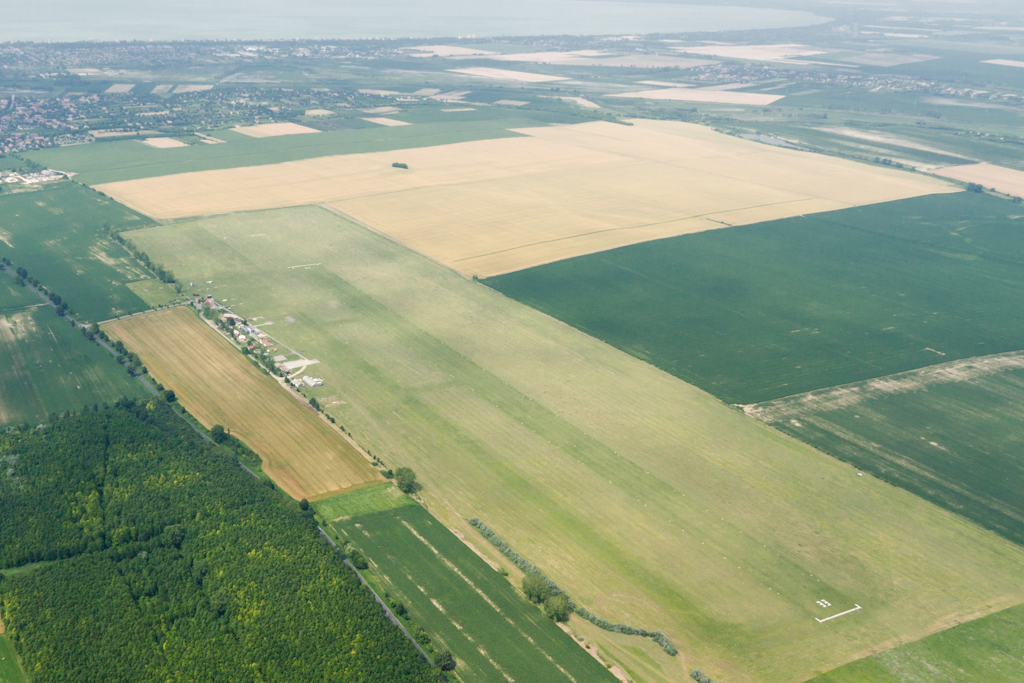
- IATA: none; ICAO: LHSK

Summary
- Airport type: Private
- Serves: Siófok, Hungary
- Elevation AMSL: 416 ft / 127 m
- Coordinates: 46°51′37″N 018°05′37″E
- Website: www.kiliti-airport.hu/en

Map
- Location in Hungary

Runways
Direction	Length		Surface
Direction	m	ft	Surface
15L/33R	1,250	3,281	Grass
15R/33L	600	1,969	Asphalt

Siófok-Kiliti Airfield (ICAO: LHSK) is a recreational aerodrome serving Siófok, the capital of Lake Balaton, Hungary.
