= Békés Airport =

Békés Airport Békéscsabai repülőtér
- IATA: none; ICAO: LHBC

Summary
- Airport type: Public
- Operator: Békés Airport Repülőtér Működtető Fejlesztő Kft. (Munkatársaink)
- Serves: Békéscsaba, Hungary
- Opened: 1943
- Elevation AMSL: 86 m (282 ft)
- Coordinates: 46°41′00″N 021°09′45″E
- Website: bekesairport.hu

Map
- Location within Hungary

Runways
Direction	Length		Surface
Direction	m	ft	Surface
17L/35R	1,300	4,265	Concrete/asphalt (98 ft or 30 m wide)
17R/35L	790	2,592	Grass (131 ft or 40 m wide)

Békés Airport, also known as Békéscsaba Airport, is a public airport serving Békéscsaba and the name-giving Békés County in south-eastern Hungary. It is located between Békéscsaba and Gyula, near main road 44 and close to the Hungarian–Romanian border. The airport has an asphalt runway of 1,300 m by 30 m and a grass runway of 790 m by 40 m, and is used for general aviation, sport aviation, air taxi operations and flight training. It hosted the 12th FAI World Aerobatic Championships in 1984.

== History ==
An airfield existed at this site prior to the Nazi occupation of Hungary, although region's main air access was the Szentesi airfield. In 1944, the Békéscsaba site was reactivated by the Luftwaffe, who stationed two squadrons of anti-tank aircraft at the airfield, Schlachtgeschwader 9 and Schlachtgeschwader 151.

The 12th FAI World Aerobatic Championships were held at the airport in 1984.

In 2006, the airport underwent substantial modernization which included paving of the main runway and taxi ways and modern lighting. While there are no regular or chartered commercial flights, the airport operator and local politics are working to establish such as soon as possible. In December 2008, an upgrade of the hangars was completed such that it can accommodate 8-seater aircraft.

=== Expansion ===
In 2022, the airport undertook a feasibility study to consider construction of a passenger terminal and new 2,500 m (8,200 ft) runway, citing government plans to develop an aerospace hub in the region.

Hungary's Minister of Construction and Transport János Lázár announced a major upgrade of the airport in October 2025. The upgrades, in cooperation with the Hungarian Defence Forces will expand the airport to handle both passenger and cargo flights to support industry developing around Békéscsaba, but it is not planned to handle regular airline traffic.

== Location and facilities ==
The airport is located 5 kilometres (3.1 mi) east of the centre of Békéscsaba and 14 kilometres (8.7 mi) west from the Hungarian-Romanian border next to Highway 44, a four-lane expressway between Békéscsaba and Gyula, Hungary.

The airport has two runways: runway 17L/35R, an asphalt runway measuring 1,300 m × 30 m, and runway 17R/35L, a grass runway measuring 790 m × 40 m. The airport provides AFIS on 123.260 MHz and has facilities for AVGAS 100LL and Jet A1 fuel. According to the airport operator, the commercial part of the airport includes taxiways, aprons and lighting for night operations, while the separate sport aviation area is used by the local aviation society.
