= Szeged Airport =

Szeged Airport Szeged repülőtér
- IATA: QZD; ICAO: LHUD

Summary
- Airport type: Public
- Operator: Szeged Transport Ltd.
- Serves: Szeged, Hungary
- Elevation AMSL: 80 m / 262 ft
- Coordinates: 46°15′03″N 020°05′21″E
- Website: www.AirportSzeged.hu

Map
- Location of airport in Hungary

Runways
Direction	Length		Surface
Direction	m	ft	Surface
16R/34L	1,185	3,888	Asphalt
16L/34R	1,177	3,862	Grass
09/27	610	2,001	Grass
- Sources: Airport website,

Szeged Airport (IATA: QZD, ICAO: LHUD) is an airport serving Szeged, a city in Csongrád county, Hungary. The airport is located 5 kilometres (3 NM) west of the city centre.

The airport is equipped with NDB and DME.

== Statistics ==
Year	Passengers	Change
2002	11 404	n/a
2003	8 532	−25,18%
2004	9 757	+14,35%
2005	4 400	−54,90%
2006	11 393	+158,93%
2007	16 358	+43,58%
2008	22 344	+36,59%
2009	24 942	+11,62%
2010	29 222	+17,16%
2011	22 107	-24,35%
2012	24 572	+11,15%
2013	22 643	-7,85%
2014	19 891	-12,15%
