= Győr-Pér International Airport =

Győr-Pér Airport Győr-Pér repülőtér
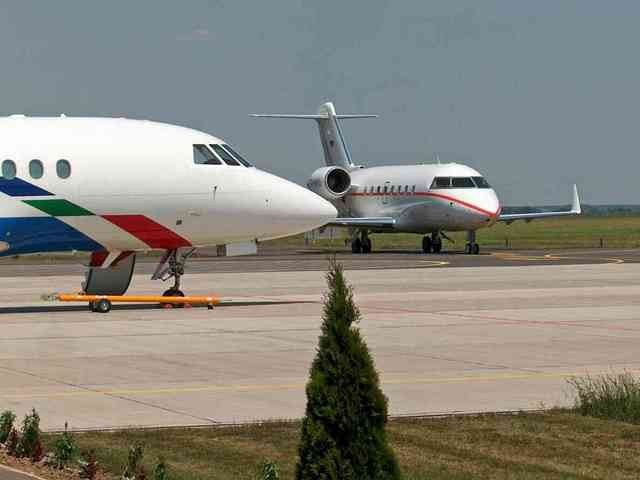
- IATA: QGY; ICAO: LHPR

Summary
- Airport type: Public
- Operator: Győr-Pér Repülőtér Kft.
- Serves: Győr, Hungary
- Location: Pér
- Elevation AMSL: 424 ft / 129 m
- Coordinates: 47°37′40″N 017°48′23″E
- Website: lhpr.hu

Map
- Location of the airport in Hungary

Runways
| Direction | Length | | Surface |
| Direction | m | ft | Surface |
|---|---|---|---|
| 11/19 | 2,030 | 6,660 | Asphalt |
| 11L/29R | 1,134 | 3,720 | Grass |
- Sources: Airport website and DAFIF

Győr-Pér Airport (Hungarian: Győr-Pér repülőtér) (ICAO: LHPR) is a public commercial airport near Győr, Hungary.

== Airlines and destinations ==
| Airlines | Destinations |
|---|---|
| Private Wings | Charter: Ingolstadt–Manching |

Effective December 2022, there are no regular passenger flights.

== Statistics ==
| Year | Passengers | Change |
|---|---|---|
| 2004 | 7 895 | n/a |
| 2005 | 11 134 | +41.02% |
| 2006 | 14 463 | +29.89% |
| 2007 | 13 405 | −7.31% |
| 2008 | 14 177 | +5.76% |
| 2009 | 8 770 | −38.14% |
| 2010 | 11 112 | +26.70% |
| 2011 | 18 976 | +70.77% |
| 2012 | 30 314 | +59.74% |
| 2013 | 31 274 | +3.16% |
| 2014 | 33 817 | +8.13% |
| 2015 | 29 437 | −12.95% |
| 2016 | 21 454 | −27.11% |
