= Budaörs Airport =

Airport in Hungary

Budaörs Airport Budaörsi Repülőtér
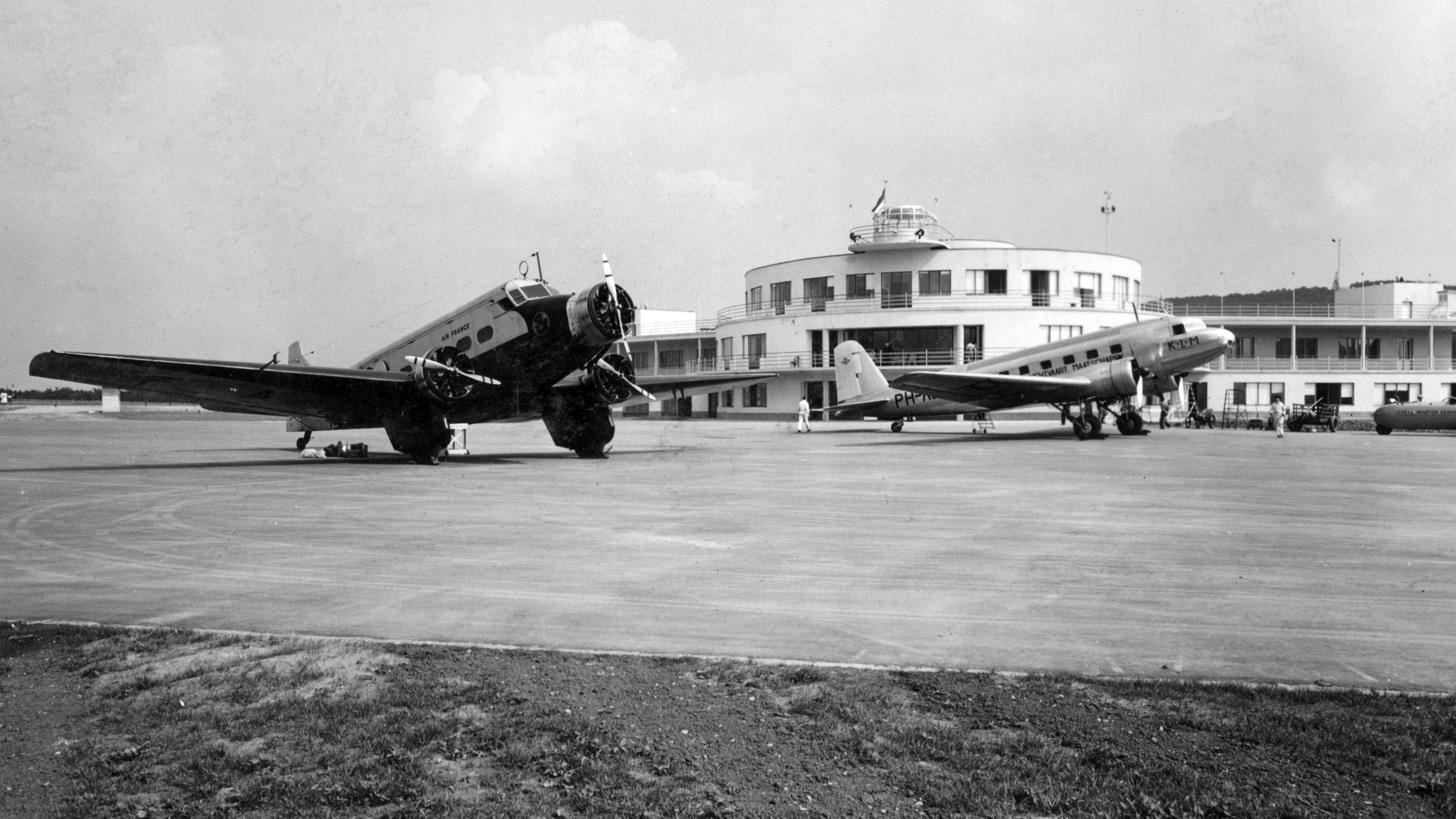
- Air France Wibault 283-T and KLM Douglas DC-2 in front of the terminal in 1939.
- IATA: none; ICAO: LHBS

Summary
- Airport type: Private
- Owner/Operator: AEROGLOBE Kft
- Serves: Budapest, Hungary
- Location: 7 km (4.3 mi) south-west of centre of Budapest
- Opened: 1937
- Elevation AMSL: 126 m (413 ft)
- Coordinates: 47°27′3″N 18°58′50″E
- Website: www.budaorsirepuloter.hu

Map
- Interactive map of Budaörs Airport

Runways
Direction	Length		Surface
Direction	m	ft	Surface
09R/27L	980	3,215	Grass
09L/27R	750	2,461	Grass

Budaörs Airport (Hungarian: Budaörsi Repülőtér), (ICAO: LHBS) is an airport located in the 11th district of Budapest, Hungary and was named after the neighboring town Budaörs. Now serving general aviation, it was once Hungary's only international airport.

== History ==
Until the opening of Budaörs, Budapest's main airport was Mátyásföld Airfield (Hungarian: Mátyásföld Repülőtér), 12 km (7.5 mi) east of Budapest. This was a very small airfield, and a replacement was established at Budaörs, at the south-western limit of Budapest's city boundary.

Planning for the airport started in 1935, and in 1936, design competitions for the terminal and main hangar were held. Construction started the same year, and the terminal was completed in 232 days, being opened on 20 June 1937. The main architect of the terminal was Virgil Bierbauer (Hungarian: Virgil Borbiró), and it is considered one of his finest works. Its grand main hall was particularly noteworthy. The building still exists, but is not accessible to the public.

The main hangar was also completed in 1937. With dimensions of 141 m (463 ft) by 41 m (135 ft), it was the largest hangar in Europe at the time. It is still in use today. The terminal and the main hangar are protected historical monuments.

The airfield was completed in the summer of 1937, immediately becoming the main and the only international airport of Hungary, and the home base of Malert (the forerunner airline of Maszovlet, which later became Malév Hungarian Airlines).

== Airlines and routes ==
The services operated in the summer of 1938 are shown here:

Company	Route	Notes
Air France	Belgrade — Bucharest	
Air France	Vienna — Prague — Strasbourg — Paris	
Ala Littoria	Vienna — Venice — Rome	
Czech Airlines	Bratislava	
Deutsche Luft Hansa	Belgrade — Athens — Rhodes — Damascus — Baghdad — Tehran	
Deutsche Luft Hansa	Belgrade — Sofia — Salonica — Athens	
Deutsche Luft Hansa	Berlin	
Deutsche Luft Hansa	Bucharest	
Deutsche Luft Hansa	Vienna — Berlin	
KLM	Athens — Batavia	
KLM	Leipzig — Amsterdam	
KLM	Vienna — Prague — Rotterdam — London	
MALERT	Arad — Bucharest	
MALERT	Prague	
MALERT	Vienna — Saltsburg — Munich — Zurich	
MALERT	Warsaw	

A service from Heston via Frankfurt was started by British Airways Ltd in April 1939, using Lockheed Model 14 Super Electra aircraft.

By 1950, Malert had been replaced by Maszovlet, 51% owned by the USSR, which operated services to Bratislava, Prague, Bucharest and Venice. Other airlines operating into Budaörs were Aeroflot, Czech Airlines, KLM, JAT Jugoslovenski Aerotransport, LOT Polish Airlines, and Transadriatica.

== End of airline service ==
As early as 1939, it was apparent that Budaörs needed to be replaced with a larger airport. Hills surrounding Budaörs Airport, a lack of room for expansion, and the need for longer, hard runways led the development of what would become Budapest Ferihegy International Airport. Ferihegy was ready in 1943, but was severely damaged by bombing during World War II. As Budaörs had survived the war relatively intact, it continued its service as the primary international airport until repairs at Ferihegy were completed. Ferihegy was reopened on 7 May 1950, and a Lisunov Li-2 flew in from Budaörs to mark the occasion.

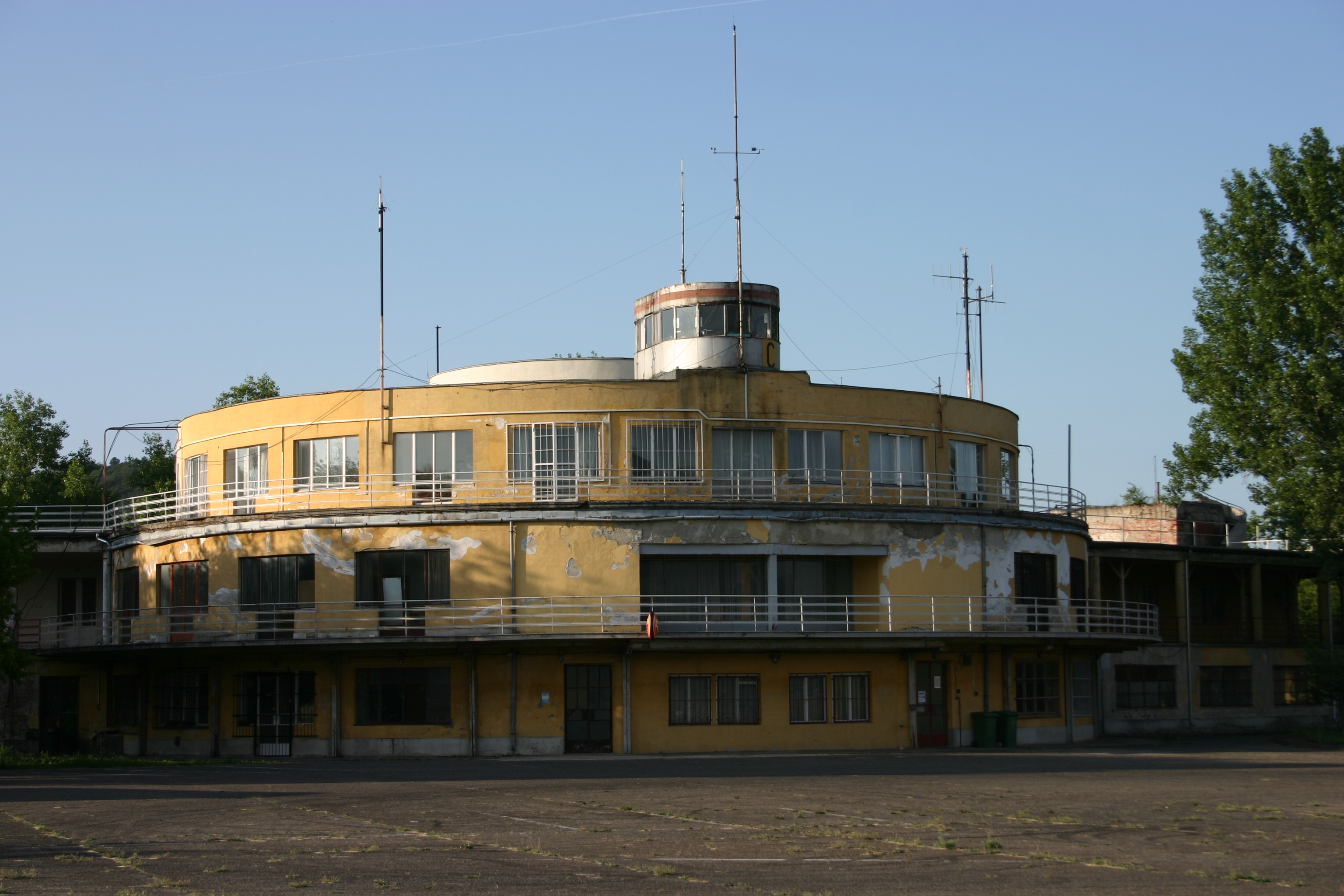
Terminal building in 2012

All international services transferred from Budaörs shortly afterwards, and recreational flying and parachuting activities which had gone on at Ferihegy moved to Budaörs.

== Current operations ==
Budaörs is now an active general aviation airport, with many light aircraft and gliders based there. It is home to several recreational- and flight training businesses, as well as of the Goldtimer Foundation, which restores and regularly gives passenger rides on its vintage aircraft, like the Lisunov Li-2, Polikarpov Po-2, Rubik R-18 Kánya and the Rubik R-11b Cimbora.
