= Hévíz–Balaton Airport =

Hévíz–Balaton Airport Hévíz-Balaton Repülőtér

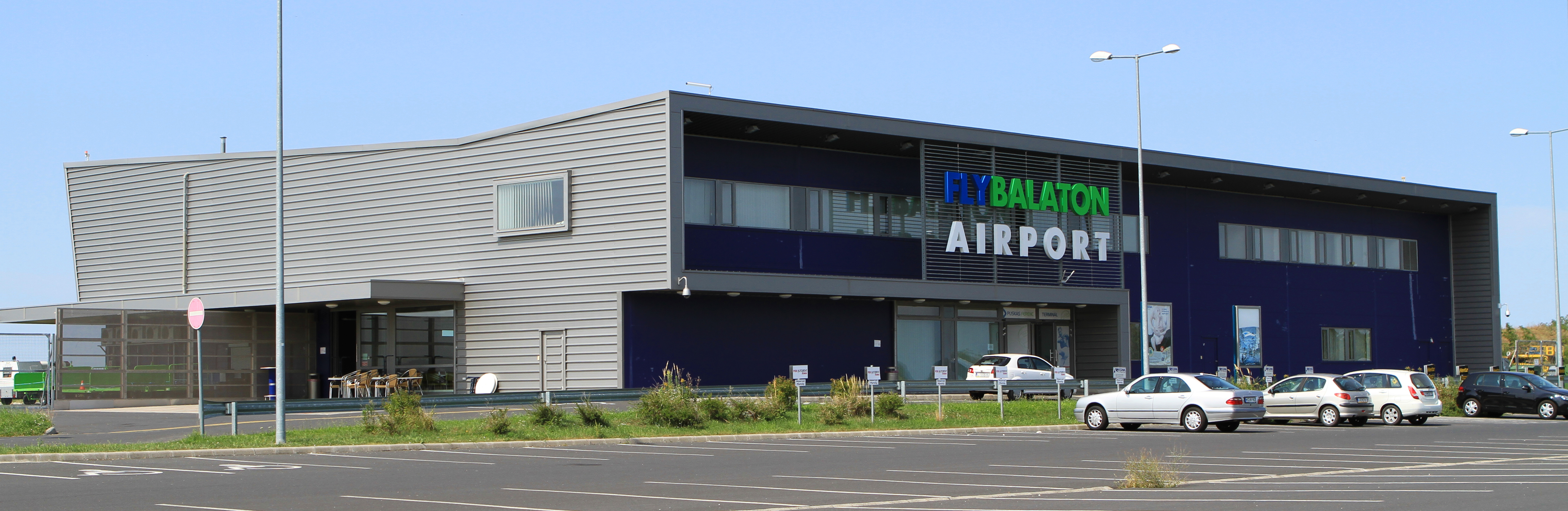
- IATA: SOB; ICAO: LHSM

Summary
- Airport type: Public
- Operator: Hévíz-Balaton Airport Kft.
- Serves: Hévíz and Lake Balaton, Hungary
- Location: Sármellék
- Elevation AMSL: 124 m / 408 ft
- Coordinates: 46°41′11″N 017°09′33″E
- Website: hevizairport.com

Map
- Location within Hungary

Runways
Direction	Length		Surface
Direction	m	ft	Surface
16/34	2,500	8,202	Concrete

Helipads
Number	Length		Surface
Number	m	ft	Surface
H1	3 × 45	10 × 150	Concrete
- Source: Hungarian AIP at EUROCONTROL

Hévíz–Balaton Airport (IATA: SOB, ICAO: LHSM), previously also known as Sármellék International Airport (Hungarian: Sármelléki nemzetközi repülőtér), is an international airport in Hungary located west of Lake Balaton, 1 kilometre (0.6 mi) south-southwest of the village of Sármellék, Zala County and Keszthely. It gains importance due to the proximity of Lake Balaton, Hungary's most important holiday resort and the thermal spas of Hévíz and Zalakaros.

== History ==
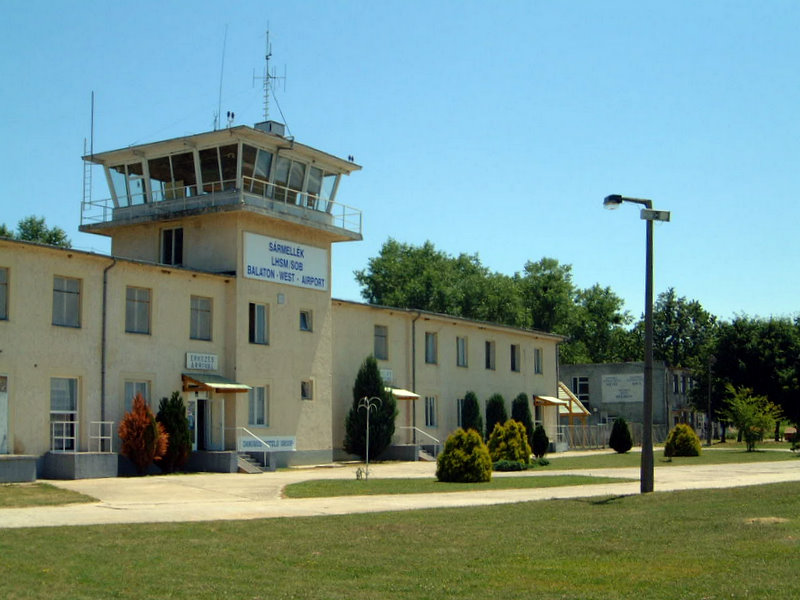
The historic airport building in 2005.

=== Foundation and early years ===
A military airport was located here in the 1940s. It was paved in the 1950s and functioned as a Hungarian military airport until 1960, and as a Soviet military airport between 1960 and the autumn of 1990. The current runways were constructed in 1982. Then named Sármellék International Airport, it had operated as a public airport since 1991.

=== Development since the 2000s ===
The airport became the second international airport of Hungary after Budapest on 15 May 2002. The airport is owned by the local governments of Sármellék and Zalavár since August 2002, operated by an Irish-Hungarian investment group, Cape Clear Aviation Ltd., since 2004.

In December 2005, Ryanair announced three weekly scheduled flights from London–Stansted, but the route was cut in October 2006, along with flights from Hahn. Due to financial problems, the airport closed over the winter period 2008–09, then closed indefinitely on 10 October 2009. A new buyer was then sought for the facility. It reopened, however, in April 2010. In the next two winters it closed, but it reopened again for the spring and summer months of 2011 and 2012. Since April 2012, the airport has been known by its new name: Hévíz–Balaton Airport. During summer 2022, Wizz Air flew to Dortmund, but the route was cancelled later in the same year.

== Airlines and destinations ==
The following airlines operate regular scheduled and charter services at Hévíz–Balaton Airport:

Airlines	Destinations
Sundair	Seasonal charter: Dresden

== Statistics ==
Year	Passengers	Change
2004	21,077	n/a
2005	25,932	▲23%
2006	63,627	▲145,34%
2007	105,697	▲66,11%
2008	102,131	▼3,37%
2009	15,075	▼85,23%
2010	14,828	▼1,63%
2011	18,191	▲22,68%
2012	18,831	▲3,51%
2013	25,015	▲32,84%
2014	28,588	▲14,28%
2015	15,748	▼38,45%
2016	17,663	▲12.16%

== Ground transport ==
A government decision in 2016 set the deadline of 2022 for the construction of a railway ring around Lake Balaton. As of 2017, there is still no decision as to whether a railway station at the airport would be part of the Balaton Rail Ring.
