= Malév Hungarian Airlines =

National airline of Hungary (1946–2012)

MALÉV Hungarian Airlines Magyar Légiközlekedési Vállalat

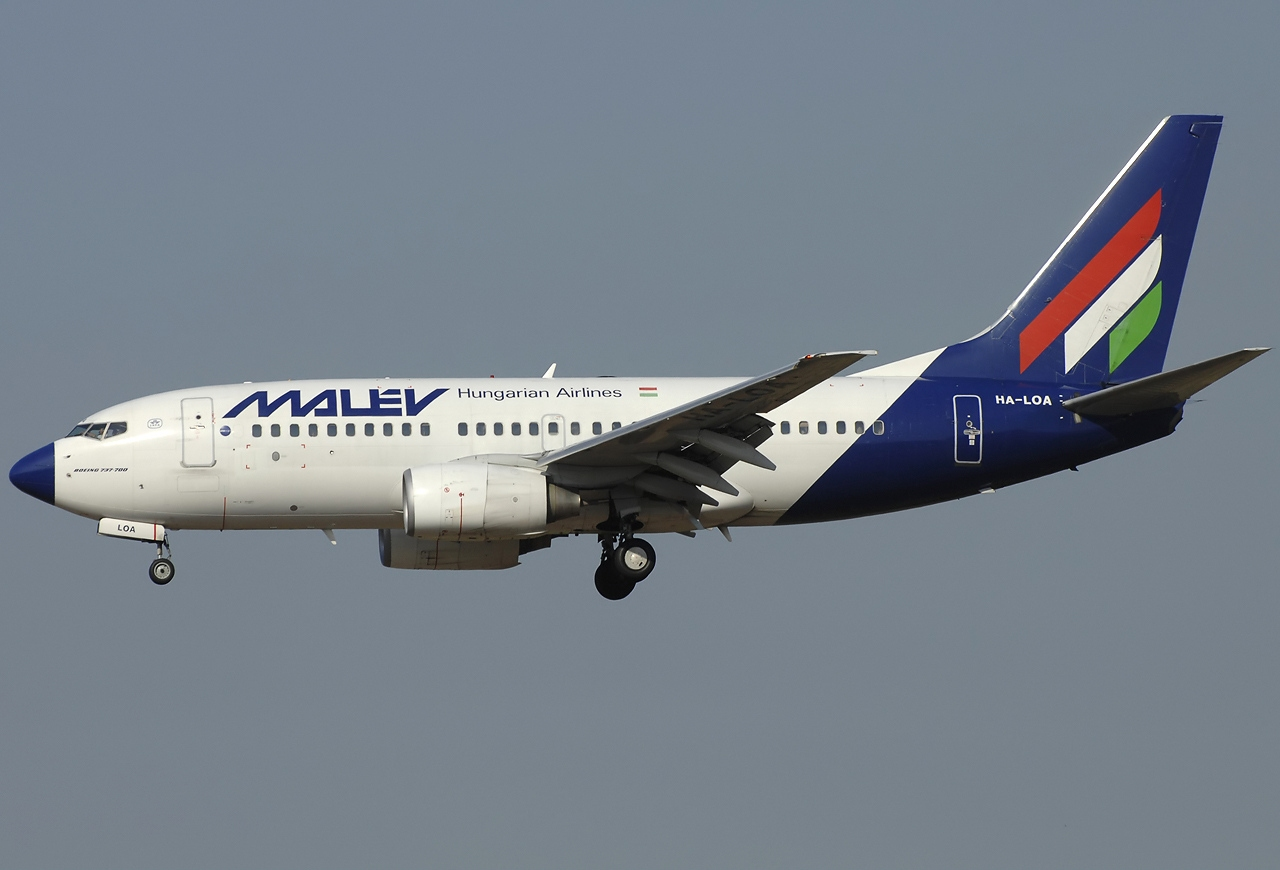
- MALÉV Boeing 737-700 in 2009
IATA	ICAO	Call sign
MA	MAH	MALEV
- Founded: 29 March 1946 (as Hungarian-Soviet Civil Air Transport Joint Stock Company)
- Commenced operations: 25 November 1954
- Ceased operations: 3 February 2012
- Hubs: Budapest Ferenc Liszt International Airport
- Frequent-flyer program: Duna Club
- Alliance: Oneworld (2007–2012)
- Subsidiaries: Malév Express (2002–2005)
- Parent company: MNV
- Headquarters: Budapest, Hungary
- Website: https://malevairlines.com

MALÉV Ltd. (Hungarian: Malév Zrt.), which did business as MALÉV Hungarian Airlines (Hungarian: Magyar Légiközlekedési Vállalat, MALÉV [ˈmɒleːv]), was the flag carrier of Hungary from 1946 until 2012. Its head office was in Budapest, with its main hub at Budapest Ferenc Liszt International Airport. The airline flew to over 50 cities in 34 countries with a fleet of 22 aircraft. Malév joined the Oneworld alliance on 29 March 2007. On 3 February 2012, Malév ceased operations and on 14 February 2012 was declared insolvent by the Metropolitan Court of Budapest.

== History ==
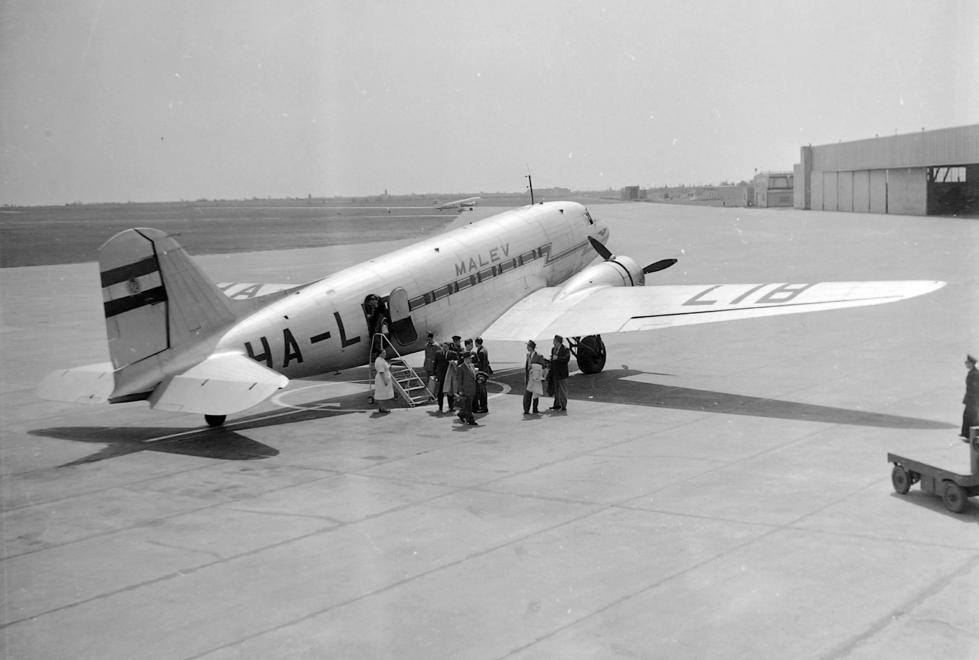
MALÉV Lisunov Li–2P in 1956

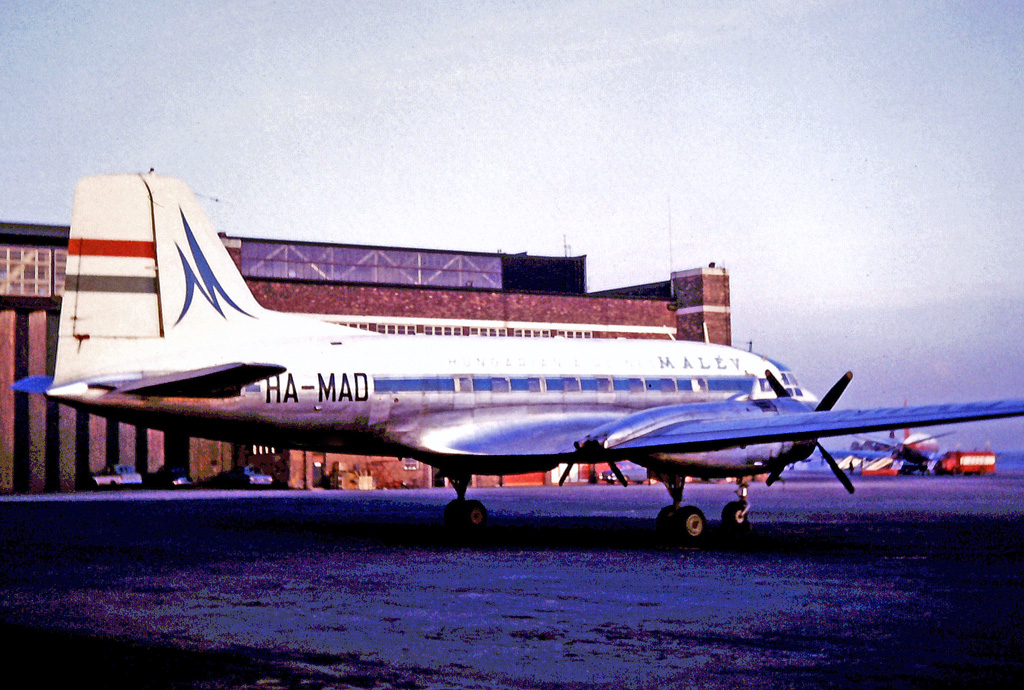
MALÉV Ilyushin Il-14P in 1966

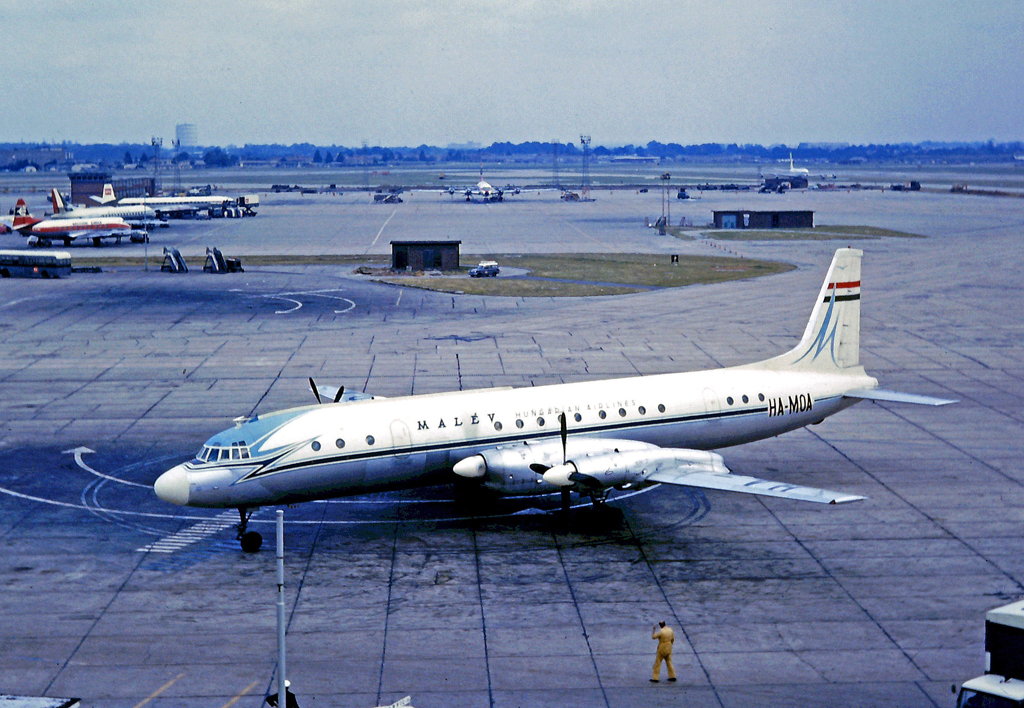
MALÉV Ilyushin Il-18 arriving at London Heathrow Airport in 1965.

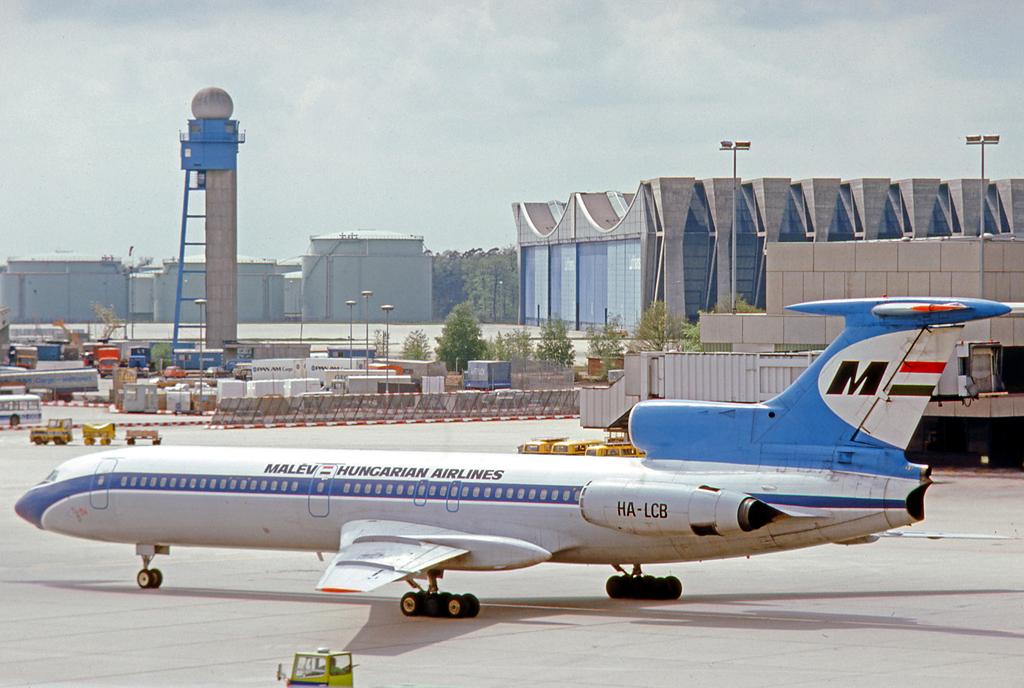
MALÉV Tupolev Tu-154 departing Frankfurt Airport in 1977.

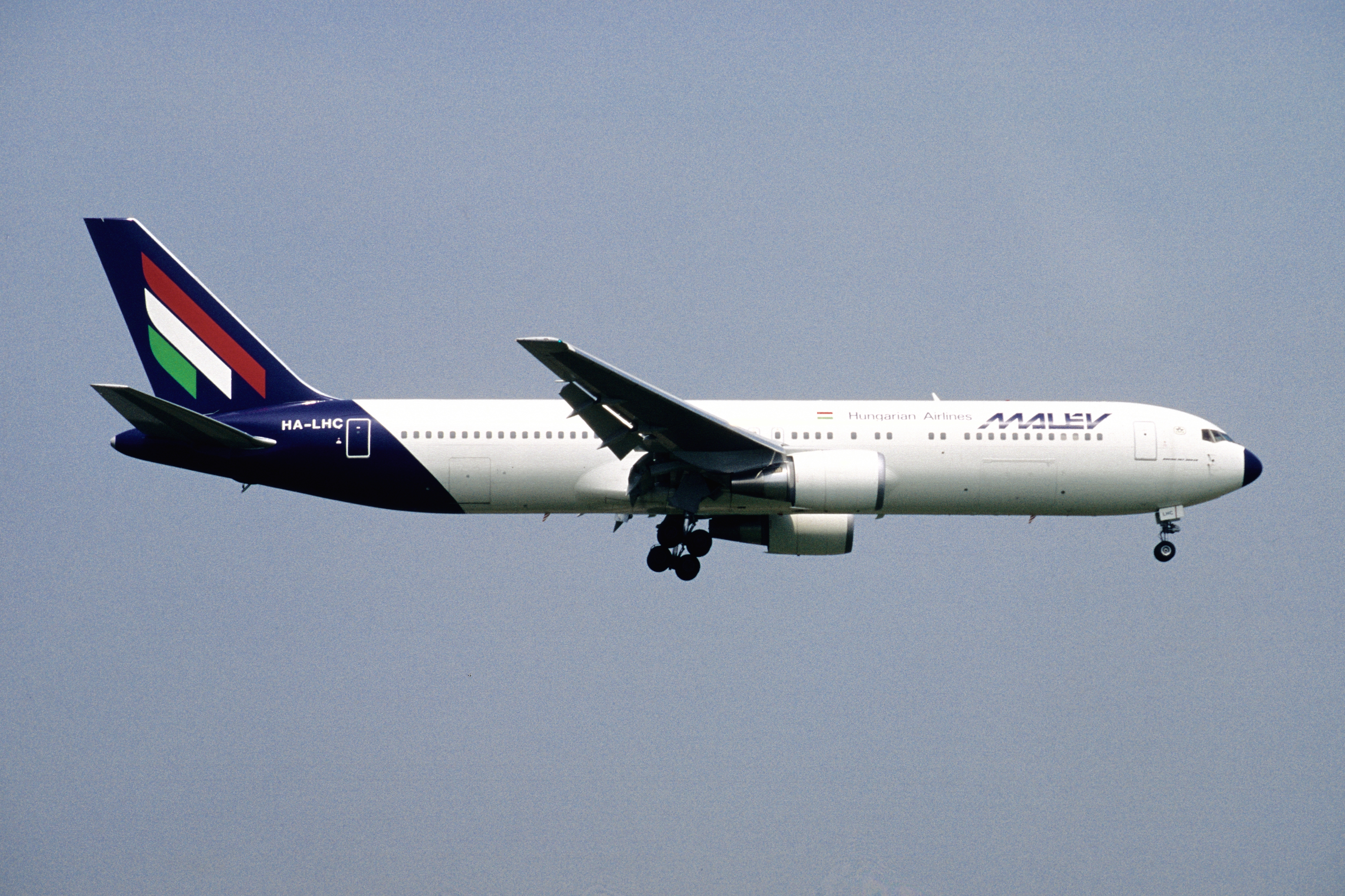
MALÉV Boeing 767-300ER operated from 1999 to 2009.

=== Beginnings ===
Hungarian civil aviation was pioneered by airlines such as Aero Rt. (founded 1910), Magyar Aeroforgalmi Rt. (Maefort) and Magyar Légiforgalmi Rt. (MALÉRT (mɒleːrt)). The widespread devastation of World War II forced these airlines to suspend airline service in 1940–44, and they were ultimately replaced by Maszovlet as the national airline after the war. Maszovlet was founded on 29 March 1946, as the Hungarian-Soviet Civil Air Transport Joint Stock Company (Magyar-Szovjet Polgári Légiforgalmi Rt. also known as MASZOVLET), as a merger between Malert, Maefort and the Hungarian part of Aeroflot.

The initial fleet consisted of 21-seat Li-2 passenger aircraft (the Soviet-licensed DC-3) and 3-seat Po-2 "taxis", used for precision air mail: sacks of mail were dropped from the aircraft when flying over its destination. In 1950, Malév's operating base moved from Budaörs to the newly opened airport at Ferihegy, where it remained.

On 25 November 1954, Hungary acquired all the Soviet shares of MASZOVLET, and renamed the company MALÉV. Ilyushin Il-14 twin piston-engined transport aircraft were acquired in the late 1950s. Operations were expanded, with flights extending to nearby countries and, following the 1965 acquisition of Ilyushin Il-18 turbine propeller airliners, and the subsequent 1968 purchase of jet-powered Tupolev Tu-134s from the Soviet Union, across Europe and the Middle East. In the summer of 1974, the Tupolev-154 was brought into scheduled service.

Even before the political changes of 1989 and the arrival of democracy, Malév had begun phasing out its Soviet-era planes with the introduction of the airline's first Western-designed aircraft, a Boeing 737-200 on 18 November 1988. With that, Malév was the second airline in the then-communist COMECON countries of Central Europe to operate a Western-built aircraft. (TAROM – Romanian Airlines started operating the BAC 1-11 in 1968 and the Boeing 707 in 1974. LOT – Polish Airlines was the third with its Boeing 767-300 aircraft launched in April 1989).

The company's logo, which turned out to be its last, was designed by graphic designer László Zsótér (DLA) in 1986 and consecutively adopted during the following years.

In 1989–1991, Malév played a key role in facilitating the emigration of Soviet Jews by operating charter flights from Moscow to Tel Aviv via Budapest. This operation, arranged in cooperation with the Jewish Agency, enabled over 160,000 Soviet Jewish refugees to reach Israel through Hungary during a period when direct flights from the USSR to Israel were not yet permitted.

=== 1990s–2007: Modernisation ===
The last Soviet-built Tupolev Tu-154 aircraft was withdrawn from service in 2001. In 2003, MALÉV began replacing its Boeing 737 Classic aircraft with 737 Next-Generation planes. It then ran a fleet of 18 Boeing 737 Next Generations, as well as 4 Bombardier Dash 8 Q-400s for short-haul routes.

From 1999 to 2007, the Hungarian State Privatization Company ÁPV Plc. (Állami Privatizációs és Vagyonkezelő Rt.) owned 99.5% of Malév shares. The other 0.5% were in the hands of small shareholders. József Váradi was CEO from 1999 to 2003. He later founded Wizz Air. ÁPV Plc. repeatedly tried to privatise Malév, finally selling it to AirBridge Zrt.

=== 2007–2011: In private hands ===
AirBridge acquired 99.9% of the airline in February 2007. It had 1,785 staff members, as of 31 December 2007.

Despite Czech Airlines' offer to sponsor Malév as an associate member of the SkyTeam alliance, and MALÉV's codeshare agreements with several SkyTeam carriers, Malév joined Oneworld on 29 March 2007.

On 12 July 2007, Lloyd Paxton was appointed CEO of MALÉV. Paxton replaced János Gönci, who remained on the board of directors as an adviser. Paxton was the first MALÉV CEO to come from the airline industry. He had been with British Airways for over 35 years and more recently with Air Astana. Two months later, on 14 September 2007, Lloyd Paxton resigned as CEO of MALÉV, replaced by Péter Leonov. In January 2009, Ballo Anatoly Borisovich became the chairman.

On 18 March 2009, the Russian state-owned Vnesheconombank took a 49% minority stake in AirBridge Zrt., the shareholder of the struggling airline, and gave managing control to Russian flag carrier Aeroflot. The Hungarian government retained 51% majority ownership. Martin Gauss, former CEO of DBA and Cirrus Airlines as well as a Boeing 737 pilot was elected CEO on 15 April 2009. During the management of Martin Gauss, MALÉV reached a load factor above industry average among "traditional" airlines, comparable to that of low-cost airlines. One of the reasons of the departure of Martin Gauss as CEO of MALÉV was the benefit ceiling established by the newly elected government, led by Viktor Orbán, in 2010, where a ceiling of €8000 gross monthly salary (approx €5000 net) was set for all managers, governing state-owned companies.

In 2009, Malév became the second airline outside of the former Soviet Union – after the Italian ItAli Airlines – to order the Russian Sukhoi Superjet 100, when it signed a letter of intent for 15 planes with an option for 15 more. News organizations speculated that the deal was influenced by minority owner Vneshekonombank and partner airline Aeroflot. The order was suspended in 2011, one year before Malév ceased operations.

The airline was renationalised in February 2010, with Hungarian state holding company MNV acquiring a 95% stake in the airline. The remaining 5% remained with AirBridge. In December 2010, the European Commission began an investigation into illegal government subsidies of Malév.

=== 2012: Financial collapse and cessation of operations ===
On 9 January 2012, the European Union considered the state aid received by MALÉV illegal and ordered Hungary to recover it from the company. The European Commission ordered MALÉV to repay various forms of state aid received from 2007 to 2010, totalling 38 billion forints (€130 m; $171 m), a sum equal to its entire 2010 revenue. At the end of January 2012, MALÉV announced that it could no longer fund its own operations, and requested more subsidies from the Hungarian government. After having two planes seized at foreign airports by creditors, MALÉV immediately ceased all flight activity on 3 February 2012, after 66 years of continuous operation. The airline's total debts were 60 billion forints (US$270.5 million) at the time of shutdown. The shutdown occurred at 6 am Western European Time on 3 February 2012. On 14 February 2012, the Metropolitan Court of Budapest declared MALÉV Ltd. insolvent. Hitelintézeti Felszámoló Nonprofit Kft. (Credit Institutional Liquidator Nonprofit Ltd.) received the appointment as the liquidator of MALÉV Ltd.

== Corporate affairs ==
=== Business figures ===
Before its closure, the airline had 2,600 employees and almost half of the air traffic at Budapest Ferenc Liszt International Airport. In 2011 about 40% of the revenues at Budapest airport originated from Malév operations, and during that year the airline served 3.2 million passengers.

=== Head office ===
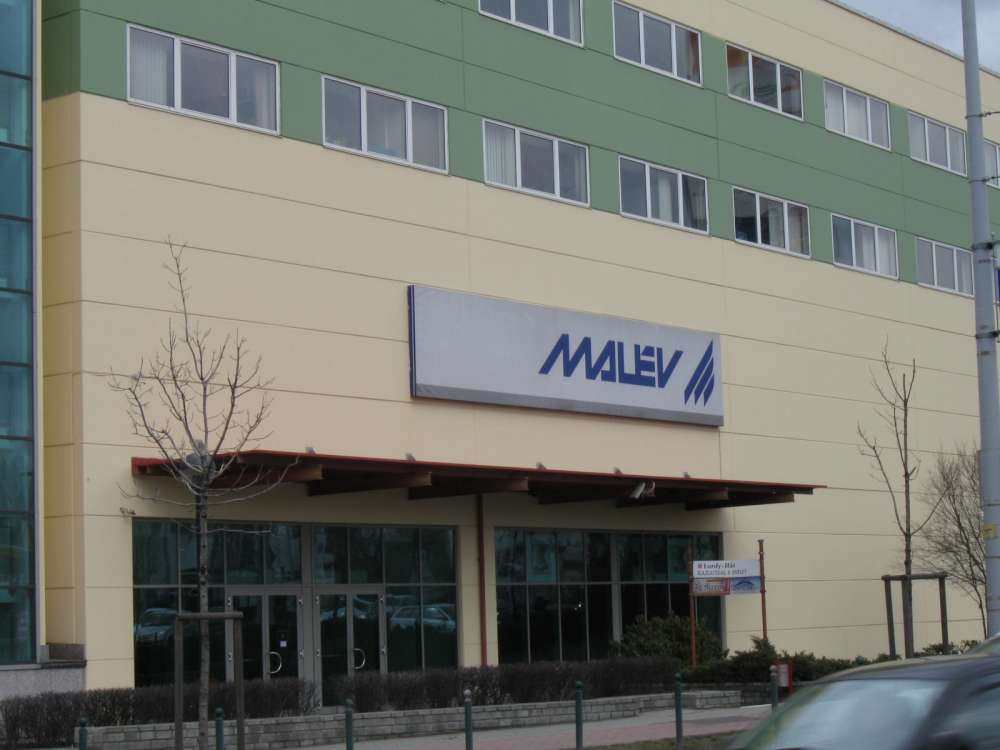
Malév's head office at Lurdy House

MALÉV's head office was located inside the Lurdy House (Lurdy Ház) in Budapest., an office and shopping complex that opened in 1998. Previously the airline head office was located elsewhere in Budapest. In the 1960s and 1970s it was in Vörösmarty tér 5. (District V), and in the 1990s it was in Roosevelt tér 2. The airline signed a lease agreement in the spring of 2011 with Budapest Ferenc Liszt International Airport agreeing to relocate its headquarters to three office buildings between Terminal 1 and Terminal 2 in the airport by the summer of 2012, but these plans were cancelled due to the shutdown.

=== Ownership ===
The airline was privatised in the 1990s. In December 1993, ÁPV Plc. sold 40,316 "A" series shares to the airline's employees. In 1998 ÁPV Plc. held 64.089% of the company (4,929,954 shares), Alitalia-Linee Aeree Italiane held 30% (2,307,693 shares), Simest held 5% (384,615 shares), private entities held 0.333% (25,577 shares), and several local governments held the rest of the company. Local governments with stakes in Malév were Agárd, Balatonlelle, Budapest, Debrecen, Budapest District 5, and Budapest District 18.

In 2007 the Russian brothers Alexander and Boris Abramovich acquired 49% of AirBridge Zrt as part of a privatisation program of the Hungarian government. After the AiRUnion alliance of the Abramovich brothers went bankrupt in 2009, Vnesheconombank took over the Abramovich stake.

The government of Hungary re-nationalized the airline on 26 February 2010, after Malev experienced changes in ownership and financial difficulties. The government held 95% of the airline while AirBridge Zrt held 5%. AirBridge Zrt was 51% owned by Kálmán Kiss and Magdolna Költő, two Hungarian individuals (very likely straw owners), and 49% owned by Boris Abramovich. Prior to 26 February 2010, AirBridge Zrt held 99.95% of Malév and minor shareholders held 0.05%.

== Destinations ==
Malev Hungarian destinations. Hungary Malev Hungarian Destinations

MALÉV Hungarian Airlines offered scheduled services to about fifty destinations in Europe and the Middle East; charter flights were also flown. Flights to Africa, East Asia, and North America had been terminated. Services on the Budapest-Toronto and Budapest-New York-JFK routes were suspended in mid-November 2007. Then, on 23 July 2008, MALÉV announced the cancellation of the New York and Toronto flights; these had been operated since the early 1990s.

=== Codeshare agreements ===
Malév Hungarian Airlines had codeshare agreements with the following airlines, beside oneworld members:

- Aeroflot (SkyTeam)
- Air Baltic
- Air France (SkyTeam)
- Alitalia (SkyTeam)
- Bulgaria Air
- Carpatair
- Czech Airlines (SkyTeam)
- Etihad Airways
- Hainan Airlines
- Moldavian Airlines
- Rossiya Airlines
- Syrian Air

== Fleet ==
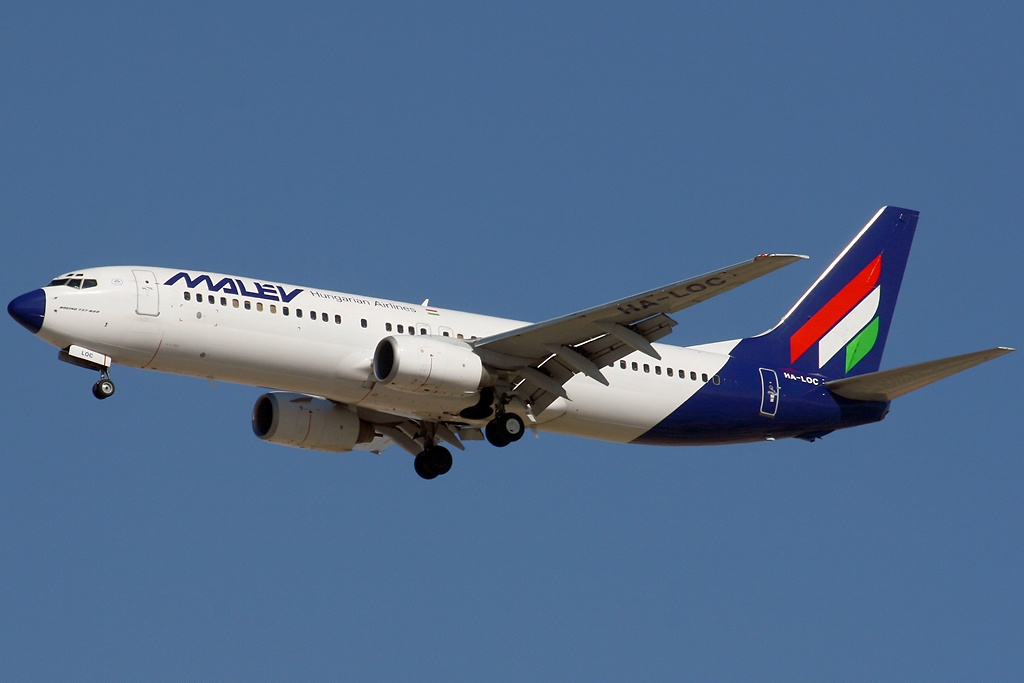
MALÉV Boeing 737-800

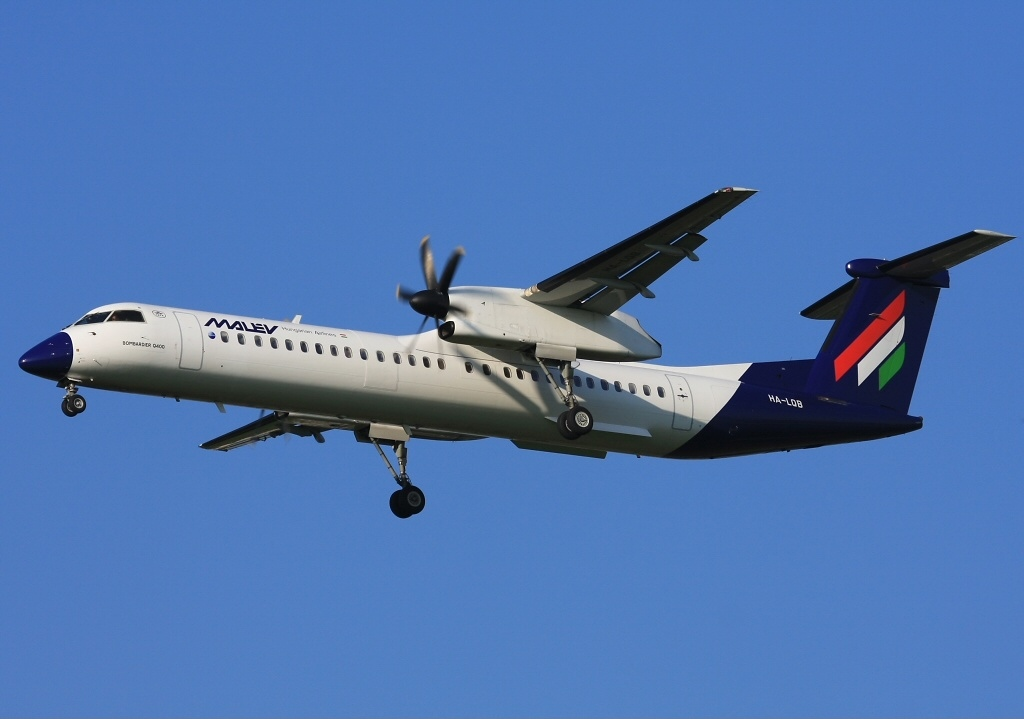
MALÉV Bombardier Dash 8 Q400

=== Final fleet ===
MALÉV's fleet consisted of the following aircraft at the time of its shutdown on 3 February 2012:

Malev fleet
Aircraft	In service	Passengers			Notes
Aircraft	In service	C		Total	Notes
Boeing 737-600	6	19	90	109	
Boeing 737-700	7	19	102	121	
Boeing 737-800	2	29	139	168	
Boeing 737-800	3	—	180	180	
Bombardier Dash 8 Q400	4	—	72	72	
Total	22				

=== Retired fleet ===
Over the years, Malév had in the past operated a variety of aircraft, including:

Malev retired fleet
Aircraft	Total	Introduced	Retired	Notes
Aero 45	1	1949	1957	
Antonov An-2PF	1	1988	2012	Used as a training aircraft by Malév Aero Club.
BAe 146-200QT	1	1988	1993	Used as a freighter jointly with TNT Airways
Bombardier CRJ100LR	1	2002	2002	Leased from Bombardier Capital
Bombardier CRJ200ER	4	2002	2009	
Boeing 707-320C	3	1990	1991	Leased from Buffalo Airways and Export Air Leasing. Used as freighters
Boeing 737-200	6	1988	2001	
Boeing 737-300	7	1991	2004	
Boeing 737-400	6	1994	2004	
Boeing 737-500	2	1998	2004	Leased from Hapag-Lloyd Flug
Boeing 767-200ER	2	1993	2009	
Boeing 767-300ER	3	1992	2008	
Cessna 152	2	2006	2012	Used as a training aircraft by Malév Aero Club.
Cessna 172	2	1993	2012	Used as a training aircraft by Malév Aero Club.
Douglas TS-62	1	1952	1961	Converted from a C-47 in 1956; written off as HA-TSA
Fokker 70	6	1995	2010	
Ilyushin Il-14M	3	1957	1970	
Ilyushin Il-14P	5	1958	1970	
Ilyushin Il-14T	1	2010	2012	Registration HA-MAL. Restored as tribute to Malév and on display at Aeropark aircraft museum.
Ilyushin Il-18V	8	1960	1989	Two (HA-MOA and HA-MOG) on display at the Aeropark aircraft museum One (HA-MOI) used as a restaurant in Abda, then moved to Košice for restoration in 2014
Ilyushin Il-62	1	1991	1991	Leased from CSA Czechoslovak Airlines for two months for flights between Hungary and Japan.
Let L-200 Morava	2	1993	2012	Used as a training aircraft by Malév Aero Club.
Lisunov Li-2P	15	1946	1962	One (HA-LIP) is privately owned and currently on display in Bócsa.
Lisunov Li-2T	9	1957	1964	One (HA-LIQ) on display at the Aeropark aircraft museum
Lisunov Li-2T	1	1980	2012	Last airworthy aircraft of the type (HA-LIX). Now owned by the Institute and Museum of Military History, and operated by a non-profit foundation.
Maule M-7	1	2009	2012	Used as a training aircraft by Malév Aero Club.
Polikarpov Po-2	5	1946	1960	Used as air taxies.
Tupolev Tu-134	14	1968	1998	One on display at the Aeropark aircraft museum One on display in Szolnok, and one on display in Auto & Technik Museum Sinsheim.
Tupolev Tu-154	18	1973	2001	Two (HA-LCG and HA-LRA) on display at the Aeropark aircraft museum
Yakovlev Yak-40	5	1987	1994	Two (HA-LCG and HA-LRA) on display at the Aeropark aircraft museum
Zlin Z-142	6	1982	2012	Used as a training aircraft by Malév Aero Club.
Zlin Z-143	1	2003	2006	Used as a training aircraft by Malév Aero Club.

== Accidents and incidents ==
- 23 December 1954: Lisunov Li-2P HA-LIF force-landed near Polná, Czechoslovakia (now Czech Republic) due to icing; while landing, the left landing gear collapsed; all 33 on board survived (one person was injured), but the aircraft was written off. On the same day Li-2P HA-LII belly-landed near Bratroňov, Czechoslovakia (now Czech Republic) due to icing; all 19 on board survived, but the aircraft was also written off.
- 13 July 1956: Flight 387, a Lisunov Li-2T (HA-LIG), was hijacked by seven people who demanded to be taken to West Germany; the aircraft landed safely at Ingolstadt Air Base with no casualties to the 20 passengers and crew on board.
- 13 October 1956: Lisunov Li-2P HA-LID was hijacked shortly after takeoff from Szombathely Airport by four armed men who wanted to be flown to the West; of the 19 on board, one died and two were injured.
- 9 June 1957: Li-2P HA-LIM stalled and crashed short of the runway at Ferihegy Airport while attempting to return following engine failure; no casualties.
- 6 August 1961: Douglas TS-62 HA-TSA crashed in a residential area in Budapest while on a sightseeing flight due to crew negligence and loss of control, killing all 27 on board and another three on the ground.
- 23 November 1962: Flight 355, an Ilyushin Il-18V (HA-MOD), crashed at Le Bourget Airport, probably as the result of a stall; all 21 on board died.
- 17 February 1964: VEB 14P HA-MAH was burnt out in a hangar fire at Ferihegy Airport.
- 19 November 1969: Tupolev Tu-134 HA-LBA overran the runway on landing at Atatürk Airport, collapsing the landing gear and injuring the navigator (in the nose); there were no other casualties, but the aircraft was written off.
- 28 August 1971: Flight 731, an Ilyushin Il-18V (HA-MOC), crashed into the sea on approach to Copenhagen Airport, killing 32; 2 survived. Dezső Szentgyörgyi, who was piloting the Il-18V at the time of the crash and also the top-scoring Hungarian ace of World War II, was among those who were killed.
- 16 September 1971:Flight 110, operated by Tupolev Tu-134 HA-LBD, crashed near Boryspil International Airport, Kiev in bad weather, following two missed approaches, after a generator failure caused the crew to switch to batteries; all 49 on board died.
- 15 January 1975: Flight 801A, a Ilyushin Il-18V (HA-MOH), was being ferried from East Berlin to Budapest when it crashed on approach to Ferihegy Airport due to weather, poor visibility, poor CRM and possible spatial disorientation, killing the nine crew.
- 30 September 1975: Flight 240, a Tupolev Tu-154, crashed in the Mediterranean Sea off Lebanon for reasons unknown, killing all 60 on board.
- 21 September 1977: Flight 203, a Tupolev Tu-134 (HA-LBC), flying from Istanbul to Budapest with an intermediate stop at Bucharest struck level ground on approach. The plane was flying at reduced power because a miscalibrated barometric altimeter caused the crew to overestimate their altitude. Of the 53 on board, 29 died, including all 8 crew members and an additional 21 passengers.
- 21 October 1981: Flight 641, a Tupolev Tu-154B (HA-LCF), struck the runway during a failed go-around attempt at Prague Airport, leading to a severe break-up on impact. No one of the 90 occupants died.
- 29 March 1989: Two teenagers from Czechoslovakia armed with grenades and shotguns hijacked Flight 640 at Prague Ruzyně Airport, and flew the Tupolev Tu-154B with 15 hostages to Frankfurt Airport before surrendering.
- 4 July 2000: Flight 262, a chartered Tupolev Tu-154 (HA-LCR), landed on its belly at Thessaloniki Airport in Greece. The crew had not successfully lowered the landing gear and the aircraft skidded 400 metres (440 yards) on the runway. The aircraft was able to become airborne again as the pilots applied full throttle. It circled until the crew managed to lower the landing gear and landed safely. There were no injuries, but the aircraft was written off, and was used for fire training until 2018, after which it was scrapped.

== See also ==
- List of airports in Hungary
- Transport in Hungary
