= Dezső Szentgyörgyi =

Hungarian fighter ace

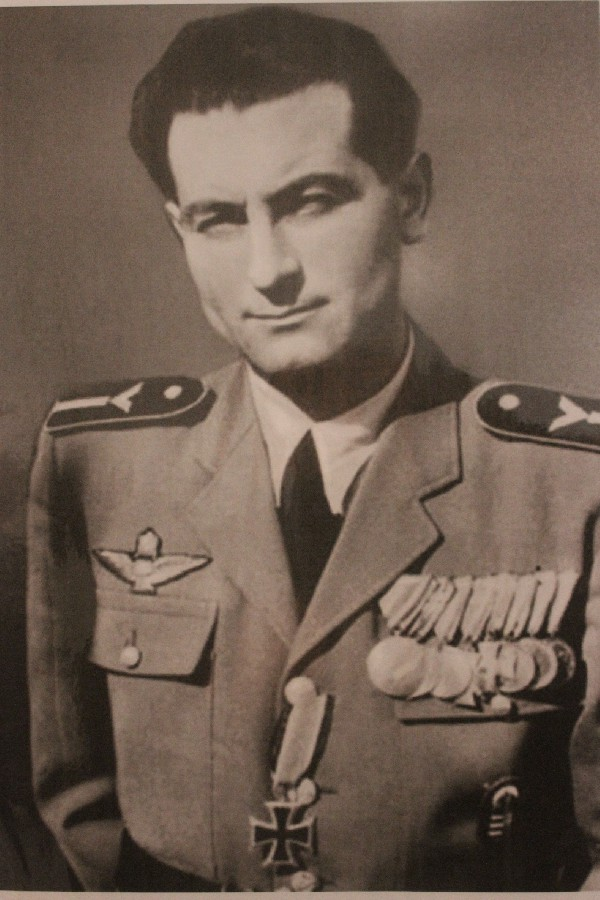
- Szentgyörgyi Dezső
- Born: 16 January 1915; Kőkút, Austria-Hungary
- Died: 28 August 1971 (aged 56); Copenhagen, Denmark
- Military career
- Allegiance: Kingdom of Hungary
- Branch: Royal Hungarian Air Force
- Service years: 1933–1945
- Rank: Warrant Officer
- Unit: 1/2. Ludas Matyi vadászrepülő század 1/1. Dongó vadászrepülő század: 101. Puma vadászrepülő osztály (101st Home Air Defence Fighter Wing)
- Conflicts: World War II; Eastern Front; Defense of Hungary
- Other work: Civilian Pilot

Warrant Officer Dezső Szentgyörgyi (16 January 1915 – 28 August 1971) was the highest scoring Hungarian fighter ace of the Royal Hungarian Honvéd Air Force in World War II.

== Early life/Royal Hungarian Honvéd Air Force ==
Dezső Szentgyörgyi was born in 1915 in Kőkút. He finished his studies in Enying, and was 18 years old when he volunteered for the Royal Hungarian Air Force. Initially he was an aircraft-mechanic, but later received pilot training. He finished the aviation school in Székesfehérvár with excellent ratings. He was trained as a fighter pilot, and took part in 1/2 FS's operations in northern Hungary with the Fiat CR.32. In summer 1942 he was transferred with the 1/1 "Dongó" (Bumblebee) Fighter Squadron to the Soviet front. He flew the Reggiane Re.2000 Falco (MÁVAG Héja), then the Messerschmitt Bf 109G. He shot down his first aircraft on 7 August 1942 in a friendly fire accident, while flying a Re.2000. The victim being a German Heinkel He 111 bomber that opened fire on him while Szentgyörgyi was trying to identify the aircraft. His first victory over an enemy fighter was almost a year later, 26 June 1943, a Soviet fighter, a Yak-1 or Yak-7, on Gresnoje. His record on the Eastern Front was 142 sorties and 6 kills.

=== In the Puma Group ===
The 101. Honi Légvédelmi Vadászrepülő Osztály (101st "Puma" Fighter Group) was formed on 1 May 1944. Szentgyörgyi was transferred to the 101/2 "Retek" (Radish) Fighter Squadron. He continued to score his kills among the Pumas, and shot down 6 American planes. By the summer of 1944 he was a flight leader. He was promoted to Ensign on 16 November 1944. After the "American Season" ended, once again Soviet fighters became the main enemy. Dezső scored an additional 17 kills. He achieved his last air victory on 16 April 1945: a Yak-9 on Guttenbrunn. He never crashed a plane due to pilot error, and he was never shot down. By the end of the war he had completed more than 220 sorties, and had 30 confirmed kills; the most successful Hungarian fighter pilot.

== After the war ==
After the war, he returned home and became a pilot of the MASZOVLET (Hungarian-Soviet Airlines) between 1946 and 1949. Between 1950 and 1956 he spent several years in Communist prisons, before becoming a pilot of the renamed Malév Hungarian Airlines again, logging 12,334 flight hours and covering more than 5 million kilometres in the air.

== Death ==
On 28 August 1971 Szentgyörgyi was the pilot of MALEV Hungarian Airlines Flight 731, and was among the 32 people killed when the Ilyushin Il-18 (HA-MOC) crashed into the sea during a storm on its approach to a landing in Copenhagen in Denmark; the crash was attributed to a microburst, a then yet poorly understood meteorological phenomenon. Szentgyörgyi and the other eight members of his crew perished, and only two of the 25 passengers survived. He was due to retire in less than three weeks.

The MH 59th "Szentgyörgyi Dezső" Air Base of the Hungarian Air Force in Kecskemét (equipped with MiG-29s until 2010 and JAS 39 Gripen fighters after) is named in his honour.

== Victories ==
Kill No.	Date	Type
1943
1	26 June	Yak-7b
2	7 July	La-5
3	3 August	La-5
4	3 August	Il-2
5	4 August	La-5
6	4 August	Pe-2
1944
7	14 June	P-38
8	27 June	P-51
9	2 July	B-24
10	16 July	B-24
11	27 July	B-24
12	22 August	B-24
13	13 November	Yak-9
14	16 November	Il-2
15	8 December	Yak-9
16	20 December	Il-2
1945
17	4 January	La-5
18	8 January	La-5
19	18 January	La-5
20	18 January	Il-2
21	28 January	Yak-9
22	30 January	Yak-9
23	12 February	Il-2
24	9 March	Yak-9
25	11 March	La-5
26	19 March	Il-2
27	19 March	La-5
28	20 March	La-7
29	23 March	Yak-3
30	15 April	Yak-9
Unconfirmed
1943
1	20 July	Soviet fighter
2	3 August	Soviet fighter
3	5 August	Soviet fighter
4	6 August	Soviet fighter
5	7 August	Soviet fighter
1945
6	19 March	La-5
