= Malév Flight 641 =

1981 aviation accident in Czechoslovakia

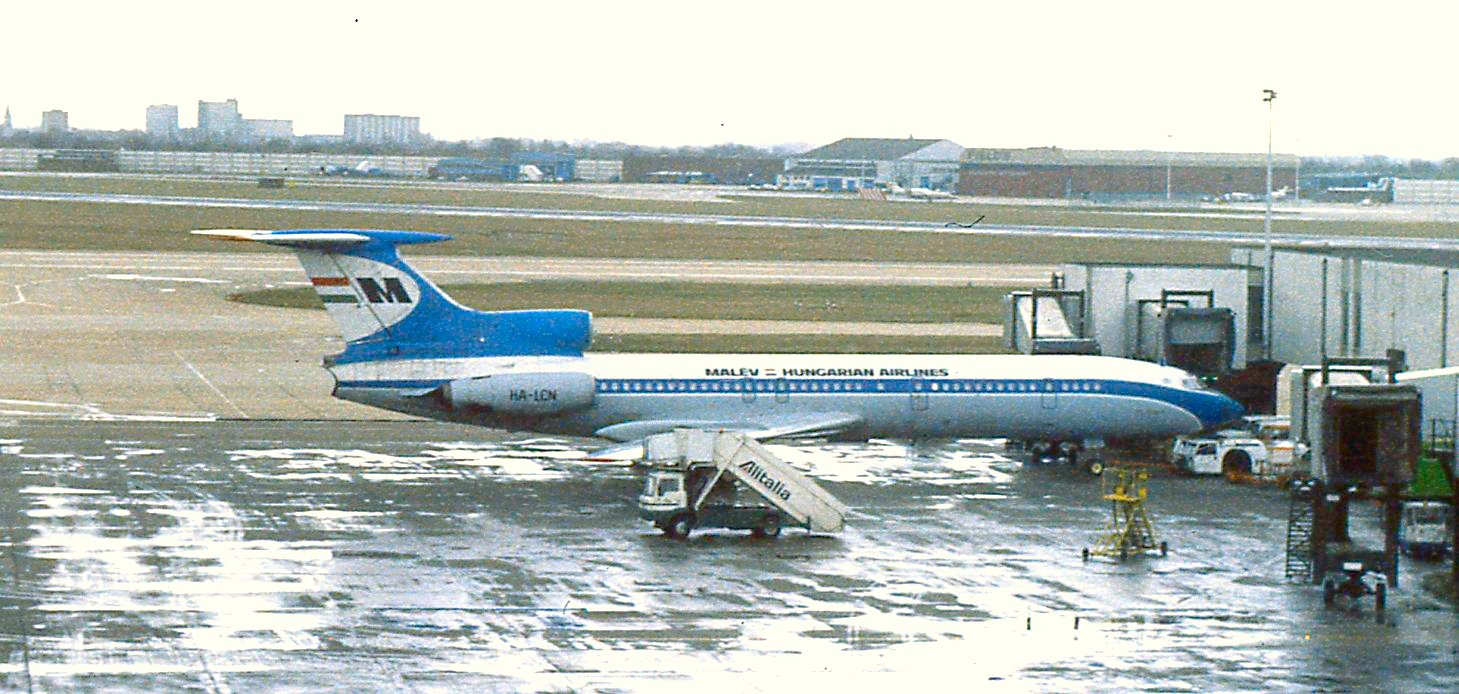
- A Malév Tu-154B, similar to the aircraft involved

Accident
- Date: 21 October 1981
- Summary: Hard landing due to pilot error, resulting in break-up
- Site: Prague Airport, Ruzyně, Prague, Czechoslovakia

Aircraft
- Aircraft type: Tupolev Tu-154
- Aircraft name: Ferenc
- Operator: Malév Hungarian Airlines
- Registration: HA-LCF
- Flight origin: Amsterdam Airport Schiphol, Haarlemmermeer, Netherlands
- Stopover: Prague Airport, Ruzyně, Prague, Czechoslovakia
- Destination: Budapest Ferihegy International Airport, Budapest, Hungary
- Occupants: 90
- Passengers: 81
- Crew: 9
- Fatalities: 0
- Injuries: 40
- Survivors: 90

Malév Flight 641 was a scheduled passenger flight from Amsterdam to Budapest with an intermediate stop in Prague. On 21 October 1981, the Tu-154B crashed in severe weather hard into the runway during landing and broke in half. None of the 90 occupants (81 passengers and nine crew members) were killed, but 40 of them were injured, 23 of which were servere.

== Aircraft ==
The aircraft involved was the Tupolev Tu-154B manufactured in October 1975. On November 30th, the aircraft received the tail registration HA-LCF and named Ferenc. In the history of the airline, this was the first representative of Tu-154B. Before the incident, the aircraft accumulated 8,893 flight hours and 5,642 landings..

== Crew and passengers ==
The crew consisted of nine people, including Captain: Ferenc "Fetya" Takacs Second pilot: Botond Szabadfi and Flight engineer: Lajos Farkas.

There were 81 passengers on board, with initial reports stating 83. Among the passengers were nine Dutch citizens, and at least one Hungarian citizen.

== Accident ==
The Tupolev Tu-154B was on a scheduled passengers flight Amsterdam-Prague-Budapest. She departed at 12:45 pm from Schiphol Airport in Amsterdam.

The landing approach at Prague Airport was carried out in overcast skies and heavy rain, combined with moderate crosswind. Horizontal visibility was 2,500 - 4,000 meters and a vertical visibility of 60 meters, which was within the meteorological minimum for this airport. The crew reported observing runway lights when the plane was 2 kilometers (1 nautical miles) left to the runway threshold. The descent was continued.

When the plane was 1 kilometer (0.5 nautical miles) left from the runway threshold, it was above the glide path, encouraged the crew to increase the rate of descent. However, the measure was not effective and the plane passed at an altitude of 60 metres (200 ft) instead of 15 metres (49 ft). When the aircraft was already 105 meters from the beginning of the runway with the flying speed of 265 km/h (143 knots), the captain reduced the engine power to idle and deployed the spoilers. The actions were made at a low altitude, which is prohibited by the flight manual. As a result, the aircraft's descent rate increased. The crew attempted to stabilize the plane by increasing thrust, but due to the inertia and the engine design (The NK-8-2U engines need 6-8 seconds to transition from idle to takeoff mode), they didn't have time to reach the specified mode.

At 13:57, with a vertical acceleration of approximately 13-14g the Tu-154B struck the ground to the left of the runway and 850 meters form its threshold. The central spar of the fuselage fractured behind the wing, separating the heavy tail. The airliner came to rest 1,220 meters from the beginning of the runway in a grass field. The aircraft was broken into two pieces. Its right landing gear remained on the runway, while the left and front landing gears were off the runway and dug into the ground.

== Aftermath ==
After the accident the airport closed for all traffic; and remained closed the full day.

According to initial reports 21 injured people were brought to a hospital in Prague. In the evening at 20:00 there was only still one Hungarian person hospitalized.

The injured people and other passengers were transported by bus that evening to Budapest, as flying was not possible because the airport was still closed. They arrived in Budapest the next day.

The pilot-in-command was blamed for the accident as he failed to perform a go-around and violated the Tu-154's flight manual (in regard to the deployment of the spoilers at a dangerously low altitude). Following the investigation, the pilot-in-command received a suspended sentence. One mitigating circumstance was that he entered the cabin immediately after landing, assisted the flight attendants in evacuating passengers, and his presence prevented panic on board.

Part of the aircraft fuselage was later used at Prague Airport as an outbuilding

== See also ==
- Aeroflot Flight 699
- Aeroflot Flight 141
- Malév Flight 262
- Inex-Adria Aviopromet Flight 450
