= Flight 355 =

Flight 355 may refer to:

- Malév Flight 355, crashed on 23 November 1962
- TWA Flight 355, hijacked on 10 September 1976
