= Malév Flight 387 =

1956 aircraft hijacking

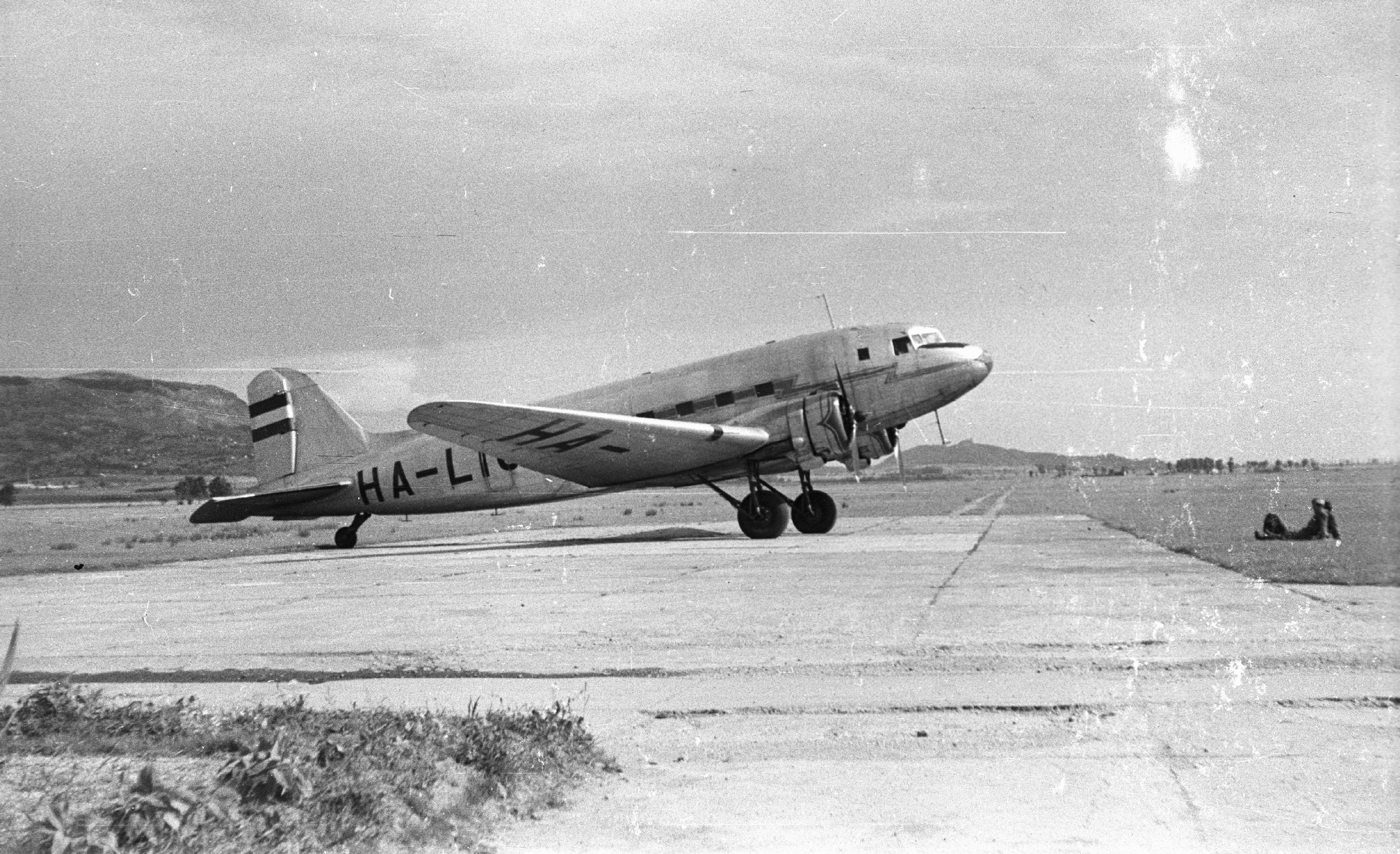
- HA-LIG, the aircraft involved, seen in 1961

Hijacking
- Date: July 13, 1956
- Summary: Hijacking
- Site: Ingolstadt Manching Airport, Ingolstadt, West Germany

Aircraft
- Aircraft type: Lisunov Li-2T
- Operator: Malév Hungarian Airlines
- Registration: HA-LIG
- Flight origin: Budapest Ferihegy International Airport
- Stopover: Szombathely Airport
- Destination: Zalaegerszeg Airport
- Occupants: 20
- Passengers: 15
- Crew: 5
- Fatalities: 0
- Injuries: 4
- Survivors: 20

Malév Hungarian Airlines Flight 387 was a scheduled domestic passenger flight from Budapest Ferihegy International Airport to Zalaegerszeg Airport, with a stopover at Szombathely Airport. On July 13, 1956, a group of seven people led by Ferenc Iszák and György Polyák hijacked the aircraft, a Lisunov Li-2 registration HA-LIG, took control of it, and flew it to Ingolstadt Manching Airport, West Germany. The two leaders of the hijackers later emigrated to the United States.

== Background ==
During the Rákosi era (1948–1956), travel outside of Hungary—particularly to Western countries—was nearly impossible for the average citizen. This period was characterized by a "siege mentality," where the state viewed free movement as a threat to national security and ideological purity. The restriction was both physical and bureaucratic. The southern and western borders were fortified with barbed wire, watchtowers, and landmines, transforming the frontier into a literal Iron Curtain. Passports were not a right, but a rare privilege. The state issued different types of travel documents, and "Western" (Blue) passports were subjected to extreme scrutiny. To travel, one usually needed to be part of a state-sanctioned delegation, a high-ranking party official (the "nomenclature"), or a trusted "reliable" worker on a specific mission. Even with a passport, a citizen required an exit permit for each specific trip. This involved rigorous background checks by the State Protection Authority (ÁVH) to ensure the traveler had no "reactionary" tendencies and wouldn't defect. Even travel to other Eastern Bloc countries was not entirely free: while significantly easier than going to the West, it still required various administrative approvals and was often organized through state-run trade unions or youth organizations rather than private initiative.

Following the successful hijacking of a Maszovlet flight on January 4, 1949, and the perpetrators’ defection, the communist Hungarian government assigned an armed security escort to every passenger flight.

== Flight ==
At 1:58 p.m. on July 13, 1956, the Li-2 aircraft took off on the Budapest–Szombathely–Zalaegerszeg flight with 14 passengers, the security officer, and a crew of four on board. At 2:53 p.m., at an altitude of nearly 3,000 meters, the seven hijackers stood up upon hearing the code phrase “Hey, that’s Győr!” and began beating the passengers with rubber batons, while also threatening them with a pistol to find out which of them was the security escort. However, the security officer, Elek Doktor, was in the cockpit; stepping out, he drew his gun and was about to fire at the attackers—but his gun suddenly jammed. The attackers thus easily overpowered him; they sent the pilots to the rear of the plane, and György Polyák, an experienced pilot among the hijackers, took control of the aircraft and set course for West Germany. Having taken control, Polyák crossed the Hungarian–Austrian border at an altitude of 300–400 meters, evading radar. As fuel ran low, the Li-2 landed at Ingolstadt Manching Airport near Munich. The aircraft landed with no fatalities and four injuries; the seven hijackers and two additional passengers decided to remain in Germany and requested asylum, while the rest of the passengers chose to return to Hungary.

== Aircraft ==
The aircraft involved was a Lisunov Li-2T with registration number HA-LIG, built in 1947 with serial number 18426601 at the Chkalov Mechanical Plant in Tashkent, Soviet Uzbekistan. The aircraft was delivered that same year to Maszovlet as a passenger aircraft. This airline later became Malév. After the hijacking, it was converted for cargo service in 1957, and a year later it was transferred to the Hungarian Air Force. It was decommissioned in 1962 and put on display in Tatabánya, then scrapped in 1968.

== Preparators ==
The hijackers were a group of seven. Their leader was Ferenc Iszák, a former left-wing journalist who had become disillusioned with socialism after witnessing the workings of the Rákosi regime. His partner, György Polyák, had previously been a test pilot in the air force, but after the takeover he was fired because he came from a “bourgeois” family, so he was forced to work in a factory. Joining them were Iszák’s wife, Emese, two heavyweight boxers József Balla and Gábor Kis, and two amateur glider pilots Károly Pintér and József Jakabfy. The group met that morning at Café Vörösmarty (now Café Gerbeaud), and from there they set off for the airport. After arriving in Ingolstadt, all seven applied for political asylum, and two additional passengers (Béla Horváth and Ilona Antal) joined them.

The Hungarian press called them bandits who had fallen from the dregs of society, and they were sentenced to death in absentia. György Polyák served in the United States Air Force, and lived in Richland, Washington, until his death in 2021, while Ferenc Iszák became an agent for the army. Later he taught martial arts, and ran a yoga studio, living in San Diego, California. He died in 2018.

== In popular culture ==
Ferenc Iszák wrote a novel about the hijacking titled Freedom Flight; in 2013, a Hungarian TV movie about the events, titled Szabadság-Különjárat ("Freedom Flight") was produced.
