= Malév Flight 203 =

1977 aviation accident in Romania

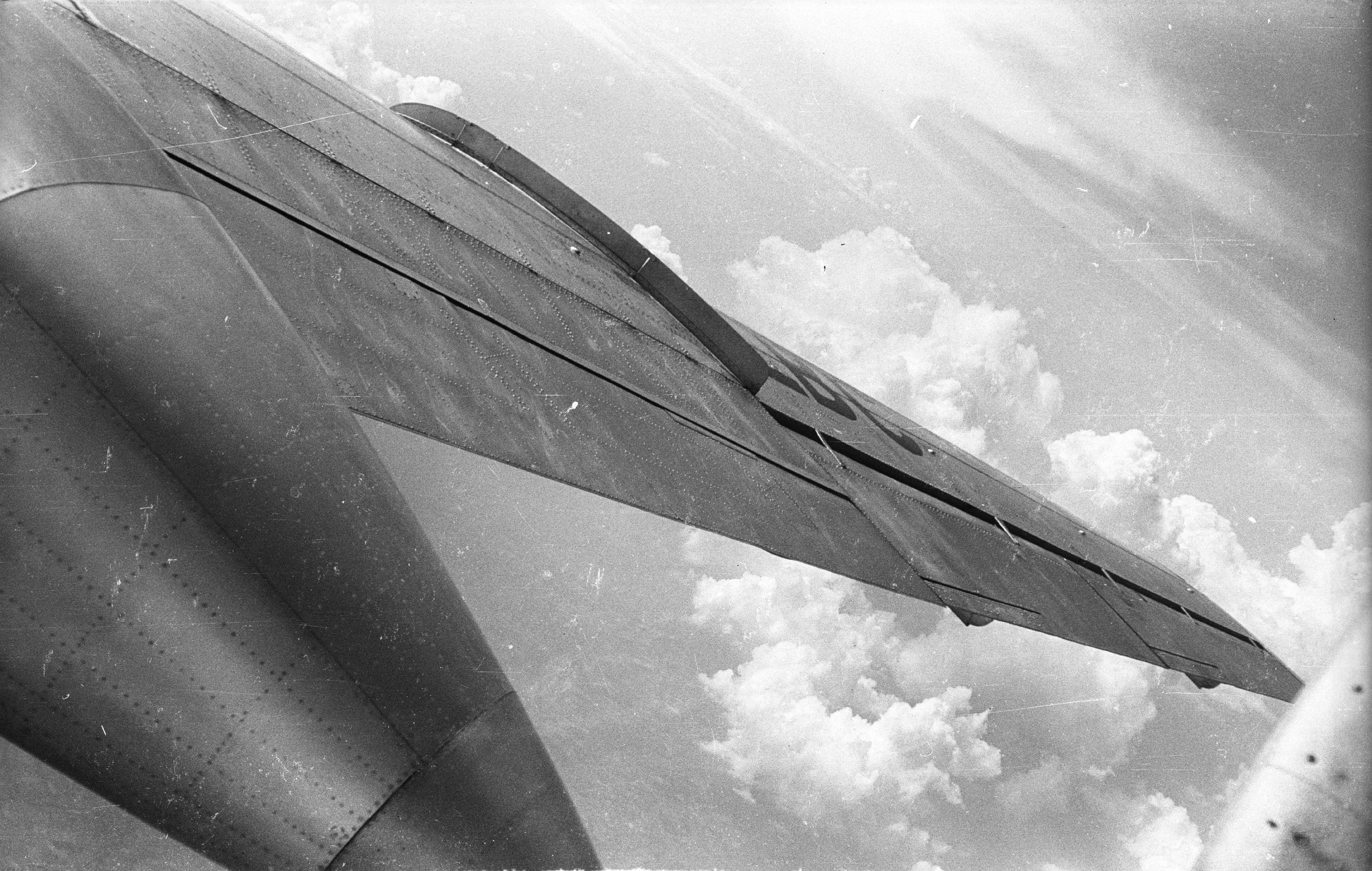
- An aerial photograph of HA-LBC, the aircraft involved, pictured in 1974

Accident
- Date: September 21, 1977
- Summary: Controlled flight into terrain during approach
- Site: near Urziceni, Muntenia, SR Romania

Aircraft
- Aircraft type: Tupolev Tu-134
- Operator: Malév Hungarian Airlines
- Registration: HA-LBC
- Flight origin: Atatürk Airport, Istanbul, Turkey
- Stopover: Bucharest Airport, Bucharest, SR Romania
- Destination: Budapest Ferenc Liszt International Airport, Budapest, Hungarian PR
- Occupants: 53
- Passengers: 45
- Crew: 8
- Fatalities: 29
- Survivors: 24

Malév Flight 203 was an international passenger flight from Istanbul, Turkey to Budapest, Hungarian PR with a stop at Bucharest, SR Romania. On September 21, 1977, the plane clipped some trees and crashed while approaching Bucharest Airport, killing 29 of the 53 on board.

== Background ==
=== Aircraft ===
The aircraft involved was a Tupolev Tu-134 manufactured in 1968 and registered as HA-LBC. Before the incident, the plane had accumulated 10,547 flight hours with 8,920 cycles.

=== Crew ===
Instead of Malév's crew, it was operated by eight crew members of the Ministry of the Interior's, including

- Captain: Miklós Bakcsi
- Co-pilot: Péter Fejes
- Navigator: László Révbíró
- Radio navigator: András Bohner
- Flight engineer: László Bocskai
- Flight attendant: Katalin Gaál
- Flight attendant: Katalin Jánosikné Harmath
- Flight attendant: Annamária Kissné Kiss

According to the final report, all eight of them died in the crash

In Hungary, the crew composition was kept secret, so that the public would not know that there were no people from the Hungarian airline Malev in the cockpit. Peter Fejes was allegedly the personal pilot and friend of János Kádár, the leader of the Hungarian People's Republic.

=== Passengers ===
Among the passengers boarding the plane were a group of young tourists from the Expressz Travel Agency, as well as Pál Tóth, the Győr correspondent of the Hungarian Radio, who wrote a full-page article entitled Moments of Tragedy in the October 1, 1977 issue of Népszabadság.

Nationalities of occupants
Nationality	Passengers	Crew	Total	Survived
Hungary	35	8	43	23
West Germany	4	0	4	0
Turkey	6	0	6	1

== Accident ==
While approaching Bucharest Airport, the Tu-134 descended significantly earlier than expected. It is found that the crew settled the barometric altimeters incorrectly, the crew didn't notice that the plane was flying too low. The spoilers (which were only allowed to be used on ground) were deployed for possibly technical problems. The aircraft descended sharply and it ended up at an altitude of 55 meters (180 feet) in the landing configuration, with 40 kilometers remaining before the runway, flying through the forest. As the crew pushed the throttle to avoid the terrain, it collided with treetops and crashed into the side of a ditch, veered into a field, where it came to rest and burned. The nose gear got stuck in an irrigation canal, the front of the fuselage broke off, and was crushed under the plane, which continued to slide from its momentum. The plane crashed at 16:58.

By the time the Romanian authorities and the fire department arrived at the scene, the firefighters just stared at the burning wreckage. The survivors were taken to Urziceni Hospital - the local hospital, where the staff did not have a good grasp of the circumstances. A survivor, who was a doctor, helped.

=== The missing Turkish survivor ===
Initially, only 23 surviving passengers were found at the scene of the accident. However, during the identification of the deceased, it was discovered that one passenger was missing. The documents were re-checked and a request was sent to Istanbul, confirming that a Turkish citizen had been on board, but for some inexplicable reason had disappeared. A few days later, the missing Turkish was found. He reported that he was unharmed and he got out of the intact part of the aircraft, took his suitcase and hitchhiked to Bucharest. After solving his problems in the Romanian capital, the Turk went to Otopeni Airport to return to Turkey.

== Investigation ==
From the orders of Nicolae Ceaușescu, a Romanian-Hungarian-Soviet commission was established, headed by the Romanian Minister of Transport.

=== Final report ===
The reported concluded that the plane had descended below the authorized altitude of 600 meters (1,970 feet). The crew had reduced the engine thrust while keeping the landing configuration; this cause the plane to increase the rate of descent. The airport only had the instrument landing system (ILS) beacons on the western side while the plane was approaching from eastward, so they have to land the plane visually. As the pilots had no visual contacts and were distracted from their conversation of the Malév's uniform, they didn't realize that the plane was losing altitude. When the crew recognized the issue and increased thrust to avoid, it was too late.

The Soviet Union and the Romanian accepted the conclusion, but the Hungarians rejected it.

=== Hungarians report ===
Ceaușescu himself, who arrived at the scene of the accident by helicopter, sent Kádár a telegram stating that the accident occurred due to a malfunction of Soviet-made equipment, while the crew fought to the end for the lives of the passengers and the aircraft.

According to the Hungarians, the plane was caused by technical problems. It is issued that when the landing gears were deployed, it also deployed the spoilers, which should only be used during touchdown. It led to the drastic decrease in speed and a sudden loss of altitude, which was not noticed by the pilots.

However, a report conducted by the chief of pilots at Malev concluded that the pilots of the Ministry of Interior were not prepared to fly civilian airliners such as the Tu-134.
