= Lloyd Paxton =

British airline CEO

Lloyd Paxton is a former CEO for Air Astana and Malév. Before heading up those airlines, he worked for British Airways.

At Air Astana, he was successful in expanding that airline's network. In the summer of 2007 he became CEO of Malév, but resigned two months later. From October 2012, he has worked as chief executive of Somon Air airline (Tajikistan).
