= Malév Flight 731 =

1971 aviation accident

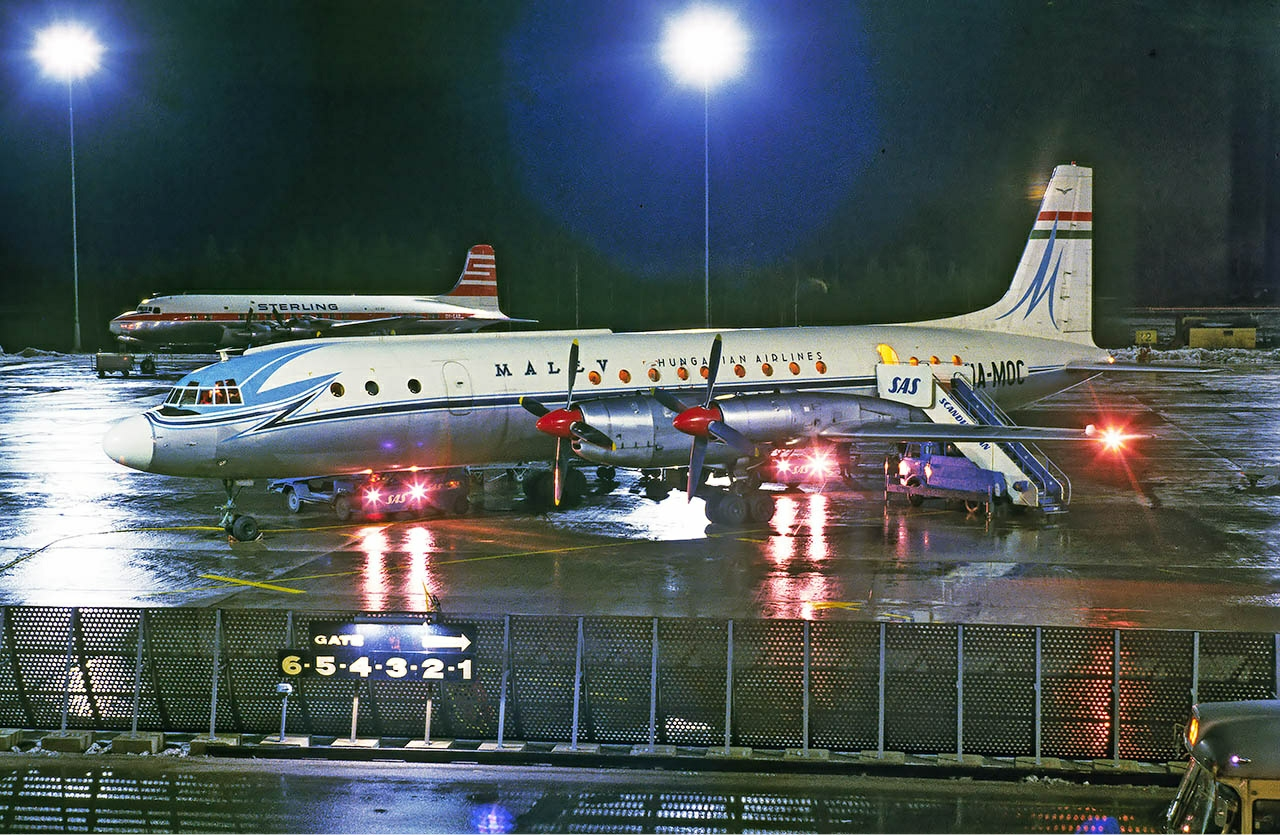
- HA-MOC, the aircraft involved, seen in 1966

Incident
- Date: 28 August 1971
- Summary: Crashed to sea due to microburst
- Site: Øresund, Copenhagen, Denmark, Scania, Sweden

Aircraft
- Aircraft type: Ilyushin Il-18V
- Operator: Malév Hungarian Airlines
- Registration: HA-MOC
- Flight origin: Oslo-Fornebu Airport
- 1st stopover: Copenhagen Airport
- Last stopover: Berlin Schönefeld Airport
- Destination: Budapest Ferihegy International Airport
- Occupants: 34
- Passengers: 25
- Crew: 9
- Fatalities: 32
- Injuries: 2
- Survivors: 2

Malév Hungarian Airlines Flight 731 was a scheduled passenger flight between Oslo-Fornebu Airport and Budapest Ferihegy International Airport, via Copenhagen Airport and Berlin-Schönefeld Airport. On 28 August 1971, during a heavy rainstorm, the aircraft, an Ilyushin Il-18, registration HA-MOC, crashed into the sea about 600 meters off the north coast of Saltholm, about 10 kilometres from the airport. Two of the 25 passengers and 9 crew survived the accident. The captain of the flight was Dezső Szentgyörgyi, the highest scoring Hungarian fighter ace of the Royal Hungarian Air Force in World War II.

== Aircraft ==
The aircraft involved was a 1961-built Ilyushin Il-18V, registration HA-MOC, which has been flying in the Malév fleet from the beginning. It flew with four Ivchenko AI-20K engines. After the disaster, the wreck of the plane was raised from the sea, and were stored in Copenhagen for further investigations.

== Flight ==
The Ilyushin Il-18 aircraft departed from Oslo, the capital of Norway, on a scheduled flight to Budapest, passing through Copenhagen, Denmark, and East Berlin, the capital of East Germany. The 10-year-old aircraft had an uneventful journey over the Scandinavian Peninsula and then turned west over the Øresund strait to approach Denmark, where it was due to arrive at Copenhagen Airport. There was a heavy thunderstorm off the Danish coast and visibility was poor. The aircraft kept in constant contact with the control tower and at 19:42 ground control cleared the aircraft to begin descent from 3300 metres to land. The power of the four engines was reduced and the aircraft began to descend. At 19:52, the aircraft reached an altitude of 500 m and released the landing gear. 20 seconds later, radio communication was lost. Less than half a minute later, the aircraft crashed into the sea and broke into three pieces, with most of its passenger compartment submerged. They were only 10 kilometres from the airport.

One German survivor, Jürgen Hermann, told to Népszava reporter: "It was raining outside. The lights inside were dimmed as usual, then suddenly I felt a great shaking, and then it was completely dark. (...) I didn't hesitate any longer, I jumped over my partner's head and crawled towards the light behind me. The wing on the tail of the plane broke off, and I found shelter from the rapidly approaching water. And slowly, in the darkness, the picture formed before me. The nose of the plane was bored into the sea and the tail was stuck up in the air, sticking out of the choppy sea about a metre."

At first Hermann thought he was the only survivor, but he heard voices coming from the water. He managed to pull one other survivor up to the base of the vertical ledge where he was standing: a young woman from West Berlin, and her 59-year-old mother-in-law managed to cling to another piece of wreckage. Also in the water was a flight attendant, with whom the two German women spoke, but he was found dead, drowned in the water. According to medical examinations, only four passengers and two crew members died from injuries sustained in the collision, the others from drowning. After the aircraft disappeared from radar and did not even respond to the controller's call, an alert was immediately issued and rescue boats were directed to the suspected scene. The wreckage was discovered twenty minutes later in the sea with the 3 survivors on board. However, one of them died in hospital 3 days later, leaving only two survivors.

== Aftermath ==
Most of the plane's wreckage and the engines were recovered from the sea. The investigation revealed that the aircraft did not have flight recorders, which is a violation of the ICAO requirement for propeller-driven gas turbine aircraft over 5,700 kg. Since Hungary became a member of the UN's International Civil Aviation Organisation in 1969, it should have applied its instructions after that date. Similarly, the cockpit lacked the voice recorder. Although the weather was stormy, no landing restrictions were imposed and the airport operated smoothly. During the flight, the wind direction and strength changed considerably, creating a so-called wind shear, which "pushes" the aircraft downwind. This can be helped by setting the engines to maximum power. This phenomenon was already known at the time of the accident, so the experts could not understand why Dezső Szentgyörgyi and his crew did not take action.

It was only more than a decade later that the real cause of the disaster was discovered: a particularly dangerous form of wind shear, the so-called microburst, which was unknown in 1971. A downburst is an extremely violent downdraft of high energy that covers a relatively small area. It is often associated with thunderstorms, but can also occur without them. An aircraft caught in the downdraft can descend up to 20–30 metres per second, with severe consequences on take-off or landing. It is particularly dangerous because the duration of the microburst is relatively short, only 5 to 10 minutes, so there is little time to detect it. Today, special weather radar monitors are operating in the areas around the airports to avoid microbursts. The problem began to be addressed more seriously after the crash of Delta Air Lines Flight 191.
