= Malév Express =

Regional airline of Hungary (2002–2005)

MALÉV Express
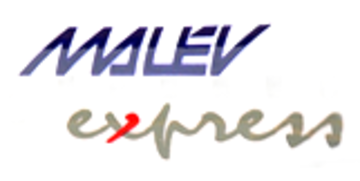
| IATA | ICAO | Call sign |
|---|---|---|
| MA | MEH | GREENMALEV |
- Founded: 2002
- Commenced operations: 11 July 2002
- Ceased operations: 1 May 2005
- Hubs: Budapest Ferenc Liszt International Airport
- Frequent-flyer program: Duna Club
- Parent company: Malév Hungarian Airlines
- Headquarters: Budapest, Hungary

MALÉV Express (also known as MAx) was a short lived Hungarian airline and a subsidiary of MALÉV Hungarian Airlines, which was founded in 2002 and shut down in 2005. The company was created to operate short-haul regional flights on behalf of MALÉV to the countries bordering Hungary, other countries close to Hungary, and some destinations in the Balkans.

== History ==
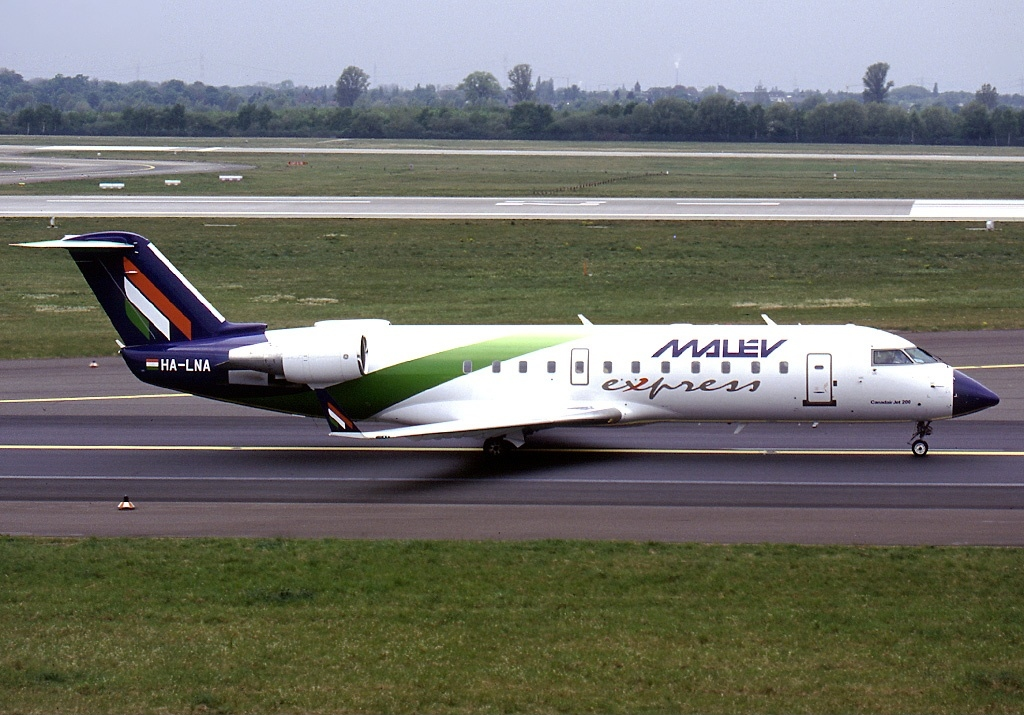
A former MALÉV Express Bombardier CRJ200 in 2003.

MALÉV Express was established due to a new strategy of MALÉV of increasing marketshare in Central and Eastern Europe. Initially, fleet consisted of a small number Bombardier CRJ-200s. According to their plans, MALÉV Express flights would feed passengers from smaller markets into Budapest Ferenc Liszt International Airport, connecting onwards on MALÉV flights, as well as its KLM/ Northwest code-sharing partners. Long-term plans included that if MALÉV Express passenger traffic increased, Fokker 70s would also be leased alongside CRJs.

On the original plans, Bombardier Aerospace would deliver MALÉV Express four aircraft, but in the end only two were delivered. When it commenced operations in July 2002, MALÉV Express launched daily flights to Stuttgart, Düsseldorf, Prague and Skopje, and from 16 September to Venice, Odesa, Timișoara and Bologna.

Although MALÉV Express initially seemed profitable, with high load factors soon after commencing operations, it became loss-making not long after. Passenger traffic was insufficient for MALÉV to sustain the subsidiary, and the Bombardier CRJ-200s were also more expensive than expected. According to some opinions, due to the small cargo space, there were regular problems with the stowage of luggage.

On 1 May 2005, MALÉV decided to cease MALÉV Express operations and incorporate its aircraft into MALÉV's mainline operations. In 2007, the CRJs were decommissioned and sold. The last MALÉV Express aircraft, HA-LNA, left Budapest Ferenc Liszt International Airport permanently in 2017, when it was sold to SCAT Airlines.

When MALÉV found itself in a near-bankruptcy situation in 2011, the idea arose that MALÉV Express could be re-established as MALÉV's legal successor, but this was only an idea and MALÉV went bankrupt in 2012.

== Destinations ==
This is the list of destinations that MALÉV Express used to serve before it ceased operations on 1 May 2005. The destinations continued to be served by MALÉV Hungarian Airlines.

MALÉV Express destinations
| City | Country | Airport |
|---|---|---|
| Bologna | Italy | Bologna Guglielmo Marconi Airport |
| Budapest | Hungary | Budapest Ferenc Liszt International Airport ^{[Base]} |
| Copenhagen | Denmark | Copenhagen Airport |
| Düsseldorf | Germany | Düsseldorf Airport |
| Geneva | Switzerland | Geneva Airport |
| Hamburg | Germany | Hamburg Airport |
| Kraków | Poland | Kraków Airport |
| Lyon | France | Lyon–Saint-Exupéry Airport |
| Milan | Italy | Milan Malpensa Airport |
| Munich | Germany | Munich Airport |
| Nuremberg | Germany | Nuremberg Airport |
| Odesa | Ukraine | Odesa International Airport |
| Prague | Czech Republic | Václav Havel Airport Prague |
| Skopje | North Macedonia | Skopje International Airport |
| Stuttgart | Germany | Stuttgart Airport |
| Timișoara | Romania | Timișoara Traian Vuia International Airport |
| Venice | Italy | Venice Marco Polo Airport |
| Warsaw | Poland | Warsaw Chopin Airport |
| Zürich | Switzerland | Zurich Airport |

== Fleet ==
=== Last fleet ===
Prior to its shutdown in May 2005, the fleet consisted of the following aircraft:

MALÉV Express Fleet
| Aircraft | In service | Orders | Passengers | Notes |
|---|---|---|---|---|
| Bombardier CRJ200 | 4 | — | 48 | All transferred to MALÉV Hungarian Airlines. |
| Total | 4 | — | | |

=== Historic fleet ===
Previously, the airline also operated the following aircraft:

MALÉV Express Historical Fleet
| Aircraft | Introduced | Retired | Total | Notes |
|---|---|---|---|---|
| Bombardier CRJ100 | 2002 | 2002 | 1 | Sold to BCIT. |

== See also ==
- List of airports in Hungary
- Transport in Hungary
