= 1961 Malév Hungarian Airlines Douglas C-47 Skytrain crash =

Airline accident

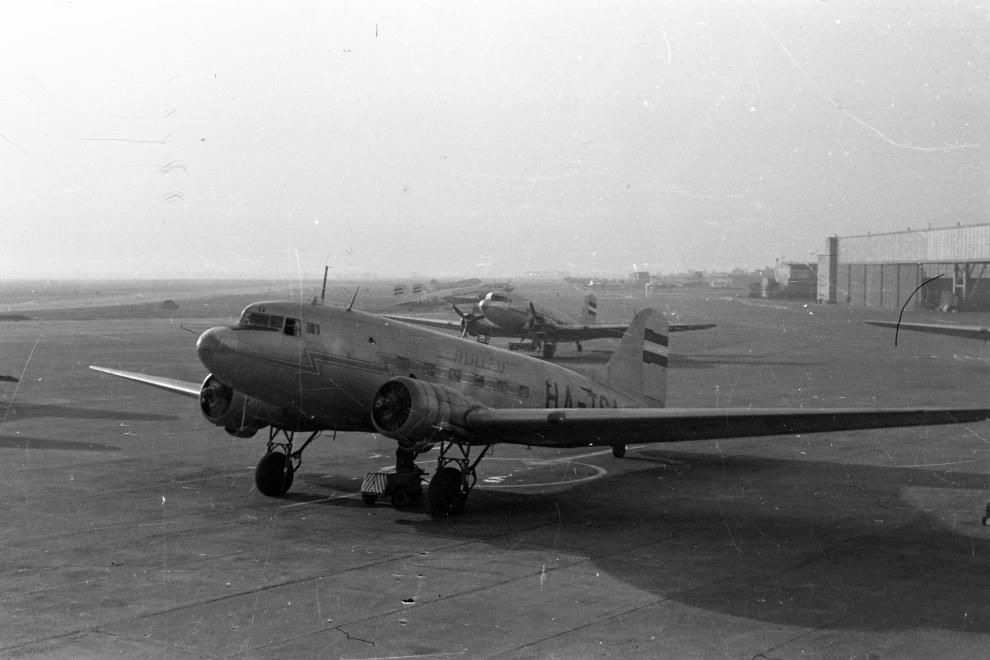
- HA-TSA, the aircraft involved in the accident, seen in 1960

Incident
- Date: August 6, 1961
- Summary: Crashed into building due to pilot error
- Site: Zugló, Budapest, Hungary
- Total fatalities: 30
- Total injuries: 2

Aircraft
- Aircraft type: Douglas TS-62
- Operator: Malév Hungarian Airlines
- Registration: HA-TSA
- Flight origin: Budapest Ferihegy International Airport
- Destination: Budapest Ferihegy International Airport
- Passengers: 23
- Crew: 4
- Fatalities: 27 (all)
- Survivors: 0

Ground casualties
- Ground fatalities: 3
- Ground injuries: 2

On August 6, 1961, a Malév Hungarian Airlines Douglas TS-62 passenger aircraft, registration HA-TSA, crashed during a sightseeing flight in a residential area in the 14th district of Budapest, Hungary, killing all 27 people on board and three others on the ground. It was the first fatal accident in Malév's history.

== Flight ==
One of the services offered by Malév that was very popular at the time were the sightseeing flights over the capital. On Sunday, 6 August 1961, the aircraft made sightseeing flights over Budapest under the command of Captain Róbert Hoffmann. The flight, which ended in an accident, was the fifth flight of the day. It left the airport at 15:44 and flew over Zugló. The flight would have taken 12 minutes. The aircraft (presumably for the amusement of the passengers) performed a wavy line flight, then began a left turn at an altitude of approximately 450 metres, after which, according to the ex-post calculations, it performed a left-right wing roll at 400 metres, with climb and descent. The nose lifted due to the elevator being held too long, the aircraft rolled to the right and then, with a severe loss of speed, turned onto its back and crashed into the apartment building at 224 Lumumba Street in a corkscrew. (The street is now called Róna Street).

The airplane did not catch fire or explode, so the building did not collapse and none of its occupants were killed. But on impact, the fuselage broke in two, the front part remained on the roof and the tail part fell down, crushing to death three young people (aged 20, 17 and 13) who were fixing their bicycles in the yard of the house. The airplane's four crew members, 17 adults and six child passengers (the youngest was only five years old) lost their lives. As it turned out, despite the 'air show', none of the passengers were fastened in their seat belts. A seriously injured woman and a three-month-old baby with minor injuries had to be rescued from the damaged building. It was only the next day that the wreckage could be pulled down and the cockpit was accessed, where the investigation revealed six bodies (two female passengers were in the cockpit without permission, while the flight mechanic was not there).

== Aircraft ==
The aircraft involved was a Douglas C-47A Skytrain, that was manufactured in 1943 in Long Beach, California, by Douglas Aircraft Company. From 1944, it flew in the United States Air Force with registration 316026 (43-16026). On 19 November 1951, the aircraft was due to fly from Erding, West Germany, to Belgrade, Yugoslavia with four American soldiers on board. They tried to avoid Hungary, which was part of the Eastern Bloc. That day, a strong southwest wind pushed the airplane towards the Hungarian border, and the pilots realised too late that they had arrived to the Mecsek mountains instead of the Yugoslav capital, where the air force tried to shoot it down, but without success. The airplane then turned back towards Yugoslavia, but was immediately fired upon (as an American border-crossing aircraft). From there it fled to Romania, and then returned to Hungarian territory. By this time the Soviet Union had also become aware of the case, and two Soviet MiG-15 fighter jets forced the military airplane to land at Pápa Air Base (the official reason given was that the Hungarians had requested the help of the Soviets stationed there because of "poor visibility"). The four soldiers on board were convicted, fined and expelled from Hungary, but the aircraft was confiscated. It was used by the Hungarian Air Force from 1952 to 1956 (with registration 026), but due to lack of documentation and spare parts it was out of the line, but it fitted in with the Lisunov Li-2s used by Malév, as they were manufactured by the Soviets under the Douglas DC-3 licence.

In early 1956, Malév took over and converted it into a passenger aircraft. It continued to operate with Soviet Shvetsov ASh-62IR engines instead of the original Pratt & Whitney R-1830 engines. The aircraft type was changed to TS-62. Its new civil registration mark HA-TSA, refers to the new type of aircraft. It entered service on 6 September 1956, first as an 18-seater and then as a 21-seater from 1959. In 1960 it was given a wing replacement.

The aircraft had already suffered one minor accident: on 16 December 1960, it departed from Szeged Airport to Budapest with four passengers. During the take-off from Szeged, the left landing gear blew out during the run-up at the moment of lift-off, but the captain noticed this only after take-off. The flight continued with the undercarriage extended. During the emergency landing at Ferihegy, the aircraft stalled and came to rest on its nose.

== Aftermath ==
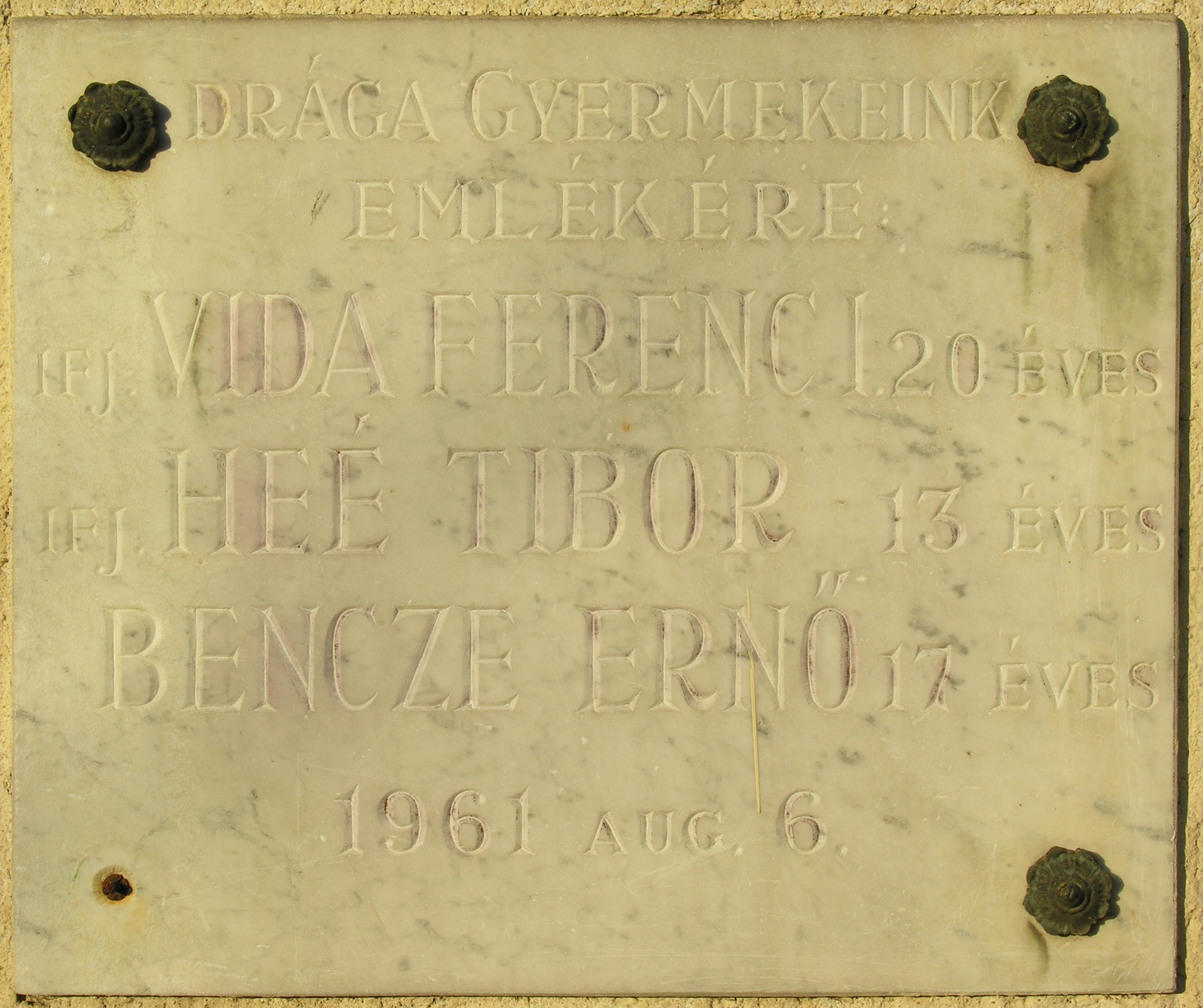
Memorial plaque on the wall of 224 Róna Street, Budapest, in memory of the three ground victims

In Hungary, the state media, controlled by the communist party, reported the disaster only in a subdued way. The official daily newspaper of the Hungarian Socialist Workers' Party, Népszabadság, reported the tragedy in a small 12-line article on its last page, and only 20 victims were reported instead of 30.

Investigations later found that the aircraft was technically sound, most likely the crew had let the passengers into the cockpit in violation of the rules of flight, and were performing wake and tight turns at low altitude for their amusement. Although the aircraft's load was 145 kilograms below the maximum permitted, 23 passengers were irregularly allocated to the 21 seats, while a total of 10 tickets were sold for the flight. After the accident, sightseeing flights over Budapest were banned for a long time.
