= 101st Home Air Defence Fighter Wing =

101. Honi Légvédelmi Vadászrepülő Osztály
- Active: 1944 – 1945
- Country: Kingdom of Hungary
- Branch: Air Force
- Type: Fighter Aircraft
- Role: Air superiority
- Size: Air Force Wing
- Nickname: Puma
- Mottos: Vezérünk a bátorság, kísérőnk a szerencse! (Courage leads, luck escorts us)
- Engagements: World War II

Commanders
- Notable commanders: Heppes Aladár

Insignia
- Identification symbol: howling red puma head

The 101st Home Air Defence Fighter Group later Wing (unit definition by US style) (101. Honi Légvédelmi Vadászrepülő Osztály later Ezred) was an elite fighter-group of the Royal Hungarian Air Force in World War II. Also known as the Puma after the unit's insignia, it was the most famous and well known of all Hungarian fighter units during the war. Created in the spring of 1944, under the Nazi German occupation of Hungary, it operated against US Fifteenth Air Force and the Soviet VVS during 1944–45 over Hungary and later, Austria. Analogue to Jagdverband 44, many of the highest scoring and most experienced Hungarian fighter pilots served in the unit, including the top scoring Hungarian ace of World War II, Szentgyörgyi Dezső.

== History of the unit ==
In the spring of 1944, following the occupation of Hungary by Nazi Germany with Operation Margarethe, the US Fifteenth Air Force, flying from bases in Italy, subjected Hungary to massed bombing attacks.

Before the actions was beginning in May, at the beginning of April 1944, the Fifteenth began operations in Hungary, Hitler's Axis ally. On 3 April, they attacked Budapest. On the German side only JG 27 groups were near enough to engage the bombers. They pilots claimed five bombers and two P-38s without loss. Two squadrons of Bf 109s and Messerschmitt Me 210 together with some other units from the Royal Hungarian Air Force took part in the defence claiming five bombers (only three was confirmed) for three losses. American total losses were five bombers, without any fighter loss, while P-38s claimed nine kills. On 13 April, the Fifteenth returned to Budapest but lost 18 bombers. III./JG 27, III./JG 3 were involved along with Bf 109 and Me 210s from Hungarian units - nine Me 210s were shot down.

The conclusion of the actions in April was the existing Hungarian fighter organisation was deemed tactically unsuitable for the effective protection of Hungarian air space from such attacks. Therefore, the Országos Légvédelmi Parancsnokság (Territorial Air Defence Command) decided to concentrate all existing fighters into a single fighter unit. The 101. “Puma” Honi Légvédelmi Vadászrepülő Osztály was created from several existing Hungarian fighter units on 1 May 1944. The unit flew Messerschmitt Bf 109 G-6, G-14, G-10 fighters, from both domestic and German production.

=== Organisation ===
Commander of the Puma Group (101/I.): Major Aladár Heppes, the "Old Puma"

Second-in-command: Captain Gyula Horváth

101/1. Fighter Squadron (nickname: Piano - "Zongora")

Squadron Leader: Captain Miklós Scholtz

The squadron was created by renaming the 2/1st Tőr (Dagger) Fighter Squadron.

101/2. Fighter Squadron (nickname: Radish - "Retek")

Squadron Leader: Captain György Újszászy

The squadron was formed by renaming the 1/1st Dongó (Bumblebee) Fighter Squadron.

101/3. Fighter Squadron (nickname: Wire Brush - "Drótkefe")

Squadron Leader: First lieutenant József Bejczy

The squadron was formed by renaming the 5/3rd Kőr-Ász (Heart As) Fighter Squadron.

=== The red Puma head and motto ===
The howling red puma head of the unit first appeared in the Royal Hungarian Air Force in 1938. Heppes Aladár designed it, and Baráth László drew the original graphic. Unlike other unit insignia, the red Puma head was not attached to a particular unit, but to the commander, Heppes Aladár, following him to his new commands. It was first used by the 1/3. (later renamed 2/2.) vadászrepülő század (fighter squadron), and then the 5/I. vadászosztály (fighter group) on the Eastern front. Ultimately, it was the unit insignia of the 101. Honi Légvédelmi Vadászrepülő Osztály and later, the 101. Honi Légvédelmi Vadászezred.

The motto, "Vezérünk a bátorság, kísérőnk a szerencse!" (Courage is our leader, luck is our escort) is originating to the commanding officer of the 1/3. vadászrepülő század, Nagy Mihály.

=== The American Season ===
The first sortie was on 24 May 1944. The US bombers attacked Wien and crossed Hungarian territory. Only the 101/1. squadron flown a sortie with 13 planes. They attacked the bombers and claimed five of them and additionally a Mustang for one killed, three wounded and seven Bf 109. There were some additional sortie, but until 14. June, the group could not encounter to the allies. On 14. June 31 Hungarian Bf 109 attacked 15 P-38 of 14. FG, 49. FS. The Pumas claimed five P-38 with one loss (JG 302 also claimed one P-38). The further actions were mostly successful, but the losses were heavy. E.g. on 16. June the group claimed seven P-38 (Sergeant Mátyás Lőrinc claimed alone three P-38 and the kills were confirmed although only one P-38 was downed.) and one P-47, but lost four pilots.

During 'The American Season', between May and August 1944, the 101. had claimed 15 P-51s, 33 P-38s and 56 four-engined bombers. The losses were, however, heavy, and the unit was pulled out for rest and refit for a brief period during the autumn. On 19 September 1944, the osztály (group) was increased to the size of a fighter wing, with Aladár Heppes in command. It was re-equipped with the latest Messerschmitt Bf 109G-10/U4 and G-14/U4 types equipped with MW-50 boost and the 3 cm MK 108 cannon.

=== Eastern Front ===
In the meantime the Russian troops stepped into Hungarian territory and the 101st's main adversary was the Red Air Force. The fight against the Russians were totally different, their operations consisted of ground attack, covering the ground troops and escorting Stukas and another bomber units. The Red Air Force used smaller units, usually in low or lower level as the USAAF. But, to shot down the heavy armored Iljusin Il-2 was also a challenge. The new Lavochkin and Yakovlev fighters were really good fighter planes, but the Hungarians lost a lot of pilots during ground attack sorties not against the fighters. The Red Army anti-aircraft guns were effective against the soft armored Messerschmitts.

On March 21, the wing was moved from Veszprém to Kenyeri. On March 26 and 27 it continued to Grosspetersdorf and on the 29th to Tulln. On April 5 the wing was transferred to Raffelding. From April 6 the aircraft quantity was shortened to 16 per group. The last confirmed kill was achieved by Lieutenant Elemér Kiss on April 17 in the Milowitz area over a Jak-9. The last mission was carried out on April 23. Three pilots were missed in the action (actually they are in MIA status until today). On May 5 the day of surrender. The squadron laid down its arms before the commander of the U.S. 206th Engineering Battalion and went to the POW camp near Wels.

=== Combat results ===
On the Eastern Front, during 1943 (5/I. “Puma” Fighter Group), the Pumas were officially credited with the destruction of 70 Soviet aircraft, to which they added further 218 destroyed and credited during the Home Defence combats in 1944–45. They were credited with 64 American four-engined bombers, and 47 fighters of the USAAF Fifteenth Air Force in 1944–45. The total number of victories credited against all opposing forces was thus 396.

Relative to the small number of 'Puma' pilots, the losses were heavy. The 101./I. osztály (group) bore the brunt of the fighting in the summer of 1944. Between its creation in the spring of 1944 and the end of the war, the group (and later, wing) suffered 51 killed, 30 wounded, 21 of them become MIA; 7 pilots become POW.

One example of a Hungarian Bf 109 from the 101. vadászezred, a G-10/U4 Werknummer 611943 however survives to this day at the Planes of Fame Museum in Valle, Arizona.

== Post-war history ==
Not many of the unit's pilots served in the post-war Hungarian (communist) air force. Most were imprisoned after show trials, some of them died in the prison, and some were executed (e.g. Lajos Tóth). The others were released after a shorter or longer period, having suffered beatings and torture. The image of Hungarian fighter pilots and aces, most of them very successful on the Eastern front, was politically unacceptable to the communist leadership. Consequently, the unit's story was largely forgotten until the 1980s, when the Royal Hungarian Air Force's legacy and history began to be revealed. Several historians and veteran pilots, such as Puma veteran Tobak Tibor, begun to publish their works on the subject then.

The Pumas' insignia, motto, and traditions were reborn in 1988, when the 1. vadászrepülő század (1. Fighter squadron) of the MH 59. Szentgyörgyi Dezső air force base took the name 'Puma' again. It contacted surviving veterans of their World War II predecessor. The unit flew MiG 21, and later MiG 29, jet fighters. The unit is now under transition to the Swedish JAS 39 Gripen.

== In popular culture ==
Historians and its veterans have published several books on the history of the 101. Honi Légvédelmi Vadászrepülő Osztály in World War II. Probably the best known example is Puma veteran hadnagy (2nd lieutenant) Tobak Tibor's Pumák Földön-Égen (Pumas on the ground and in the air) (in Hungarian), and later in French as Les Pumas Rouges (The red Pumas).

The name Puma is also very popular amongst Hungarian virtual fighter squadrons, with many simulator clans such as the 101. Puma Virtuális Vadászosztály taking on the name.
