= Malév Flight 801A =

1975 aviation incident in Hungary

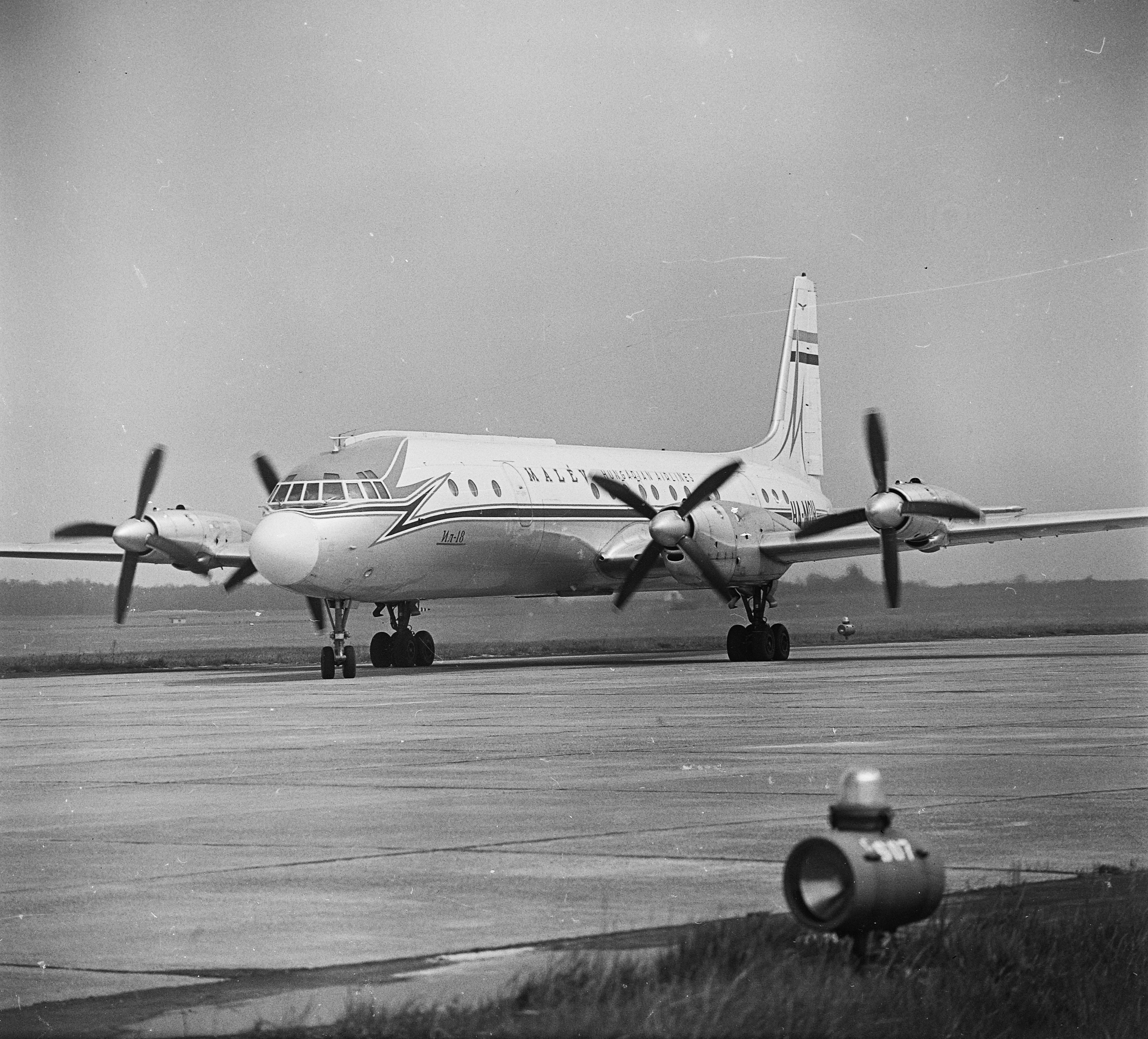
- HA-MOH, the aircraft involved, seen in 1966

Accident
- Date: January 15, 1975
- Summary: Crashed following loss of control due to spatial disorientation during go-around
- Site: Budapest Ferihegy International Airport, Budapest, Hungarian People's Republic; 47°26′22″N 19°15′43″E

Aircraft
- Aircraft type: Ilyushin Il-18V
- Aircraft name: Helén
- Operator: Malév Hungarian Airlines
- Registration: HA-MOH
- Flight origin: Berlin Schönefeld Airport
- Destination: Budapest Ferihegy International Airport
- Occupants: 9
- Passengers: 0
- Crew: 9
- Fatalities: 9
- Survivors: 0

Malév Hungarian Airlines Flight 801A was a ferry flight from Berlin Schönefeld Airport to Budapest Ferihegy International Airport. On January 15, 1975, an Ilyushin Il-18 registered HA-MOH crashed on the runway at Budapest Airport in thick fog. All nine crew members on board died.

== Flight ==
The aircraft had departed two days earlier to fly the East Berlin–Budapest route, but due to unfavorable weather conditions in Budapest, the return flight was rescheduled first to January 14 and then to January 15. The aircraft departed for the Hungarian capital without passengers, with a crew of nine on board, 10 minutes after the previous flight, Flight 801 carrying passengers, which was also operated by an Il-18 with registration number HA-MOA. The flight over the territories of the East Germany and Czechoslovakia was uneventful, with radio contact maintained with several control centers. During the flight, the pilot learned that the weather over Budapest had deteriorated—despite an earlier improvement—and suggested landing in Prague. Ultimately, the captains of Flight 801 and 801A, consulting with each other via radio, decided that if landing at Ferihegy was not possible, they would instead land at Debrecen International Airport. Flight 801, flying ahead with the passengers, headed for Debrecen after an unsuccessful attempt to land at Ferihegy, but Flight 801A's captain, András Szerencsés, decided at the last moment to also attempt a landing in Budapest.

The weather information available to them was somewhat contradictory. The officially reported vertical visibility was only 30 meters, even though they should have been able to see the runway from an altitude of 90 meters during landing. Before their arrival, an Austrian aircraft had taken off and turned back to Vienna. At the same time, the crew of a departing Malév aircraft reported a runway visual range (RVR) of 2 kilometers and vertical visibility of 90–100 meters, which was not too bad. According to the investigation, the pilots of Flight 801 approached the airport from Runway 31 (from Vecsés) with an RVR of 1,300 meters and a crosswind of 20 kilometers per hour, manually following the signals of the ILS landing system. The maneuver placed an extremely heavy burden on the pilots, as Malév's Il-18s lacked the “director” system—widely used by the Soviets—which could have greatly facilitated the instrument approach based on the ILS signal. The aircraft soon reported that it was going to go around. The controller instructed them to reach an altitude of 600 meters, which they acknowledged. According to the aircraft's flight data recorder, they stopped the go-around after a few seconds and began descending again, then switched back to a go-around, but at that moment one of the pilots pushed the elevator control forward sharply, causing the aircraft to enter a steep descent. At 5:21 p.m., the aircraft crashed onto the runway, exploded, and was destroyed. All 9 crew members were lost in the disaster.

== Aircraft ==
The aircraft involved was an 11-year-old Ilyushin Il-18V built in 1964, with serial number 184007104, which was manufactured in the Soviet Union and delivered to Malév in the year of its manufacture, and was registered as HA-MOH. Its nickname was Helén.

== Investigation ==
Since cockpit voice recordings were not yet in use at the time, the accident investigators were unable to clearly determine the reasons for the course changes, but they assumed that after beginning the first go-around, the captain was able to see the ground again and decided to attempt the landing once more. When this failed, he attempted another go-around, but at that point, he may have been overcome by a dangerous sensory illusion. This can occur when the pilot of a go-around aircraft, sensing longitudinal acceleration, perceives the climb as too steep and—presumably—pushes the control column forward under the influence of this sensation.

The final report reveals that as the aircraft approached the Budapest area, communication with the control center was not entirely clear; the responses were not always intelligible or discernible, although the aircraft acknowledged the go-around instruction. According to the transcript of the chief navigator-radio operator's hearing: “It gave me the impression that, at the end of his statement, István Szatmári [the navigator] was affected by some psychological or physical influence.”
