= Malév Flight 355 =

Aviation accident

Malév Hungarian Airlines Flight 355
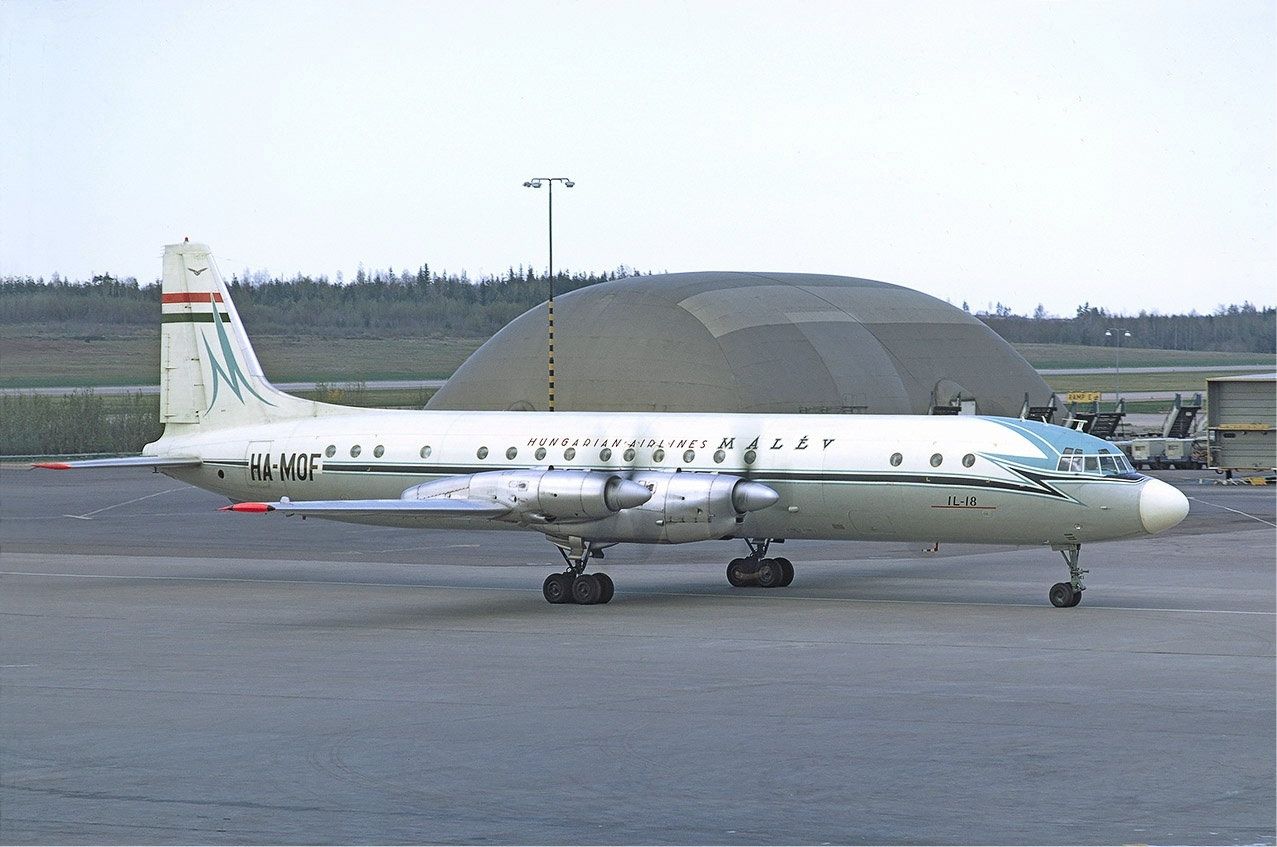
- A Malév Hungarian Airlines Ilyushin Il-18, similar to the aircraft involved

Accident
- Date: 23 November 1962
- Summary: Stall during approach
- Site: Roissy-en-France, 6.1 km from Paris–Le Bourget Airport, France

Aircraft
- Aircraft type: Ilyushin Il-18V
- Operator: Malév Hungarian Airlines
- Registration: HA-MOD
- Flight origin: Budapest Ferenc Liszt International Airport, Budapest, Hungary
- Stopover: Frankfurt Airport, Frankfurt, Germany
- Destination: Paris–Le Bourget Airport, Paris, France
- Occupants: 21
- Passengers: 13
- Crew: 8
- Fatalities: 21
- Survivors: 0

Malév Hungarian Airlines Flight 355 was a regularly scheduled Malév Hungarian Airlines international flight from Budapest to Paris via a stopover in Frankfurt. The flight was operated by an Ilyushin Il-18V. On 23 November 1962, while on approach to Paris–Le Bourget Airport, the aircraft crashed in Roissy-en-France following a stall.

The plane burned down, and all 21 people on board were killed, including Hungarian diplomats and French professor Louis Fruhling.

== Aircraft ==
The aircraft involved was a two-year-old four-engine turboprop Ilyushin Il-18V with serial number 2002 and registration HA-MOD. The aircraft was powered by four Ivchenko AI-20A engines. At the time of the accident, the aircraft had flown for a total of 2,363 hours.

== Passengers and crew ==
=== Crew ===
There were eight crew members on board. The captain was Hungarian István Kapitány (born 23 November 1929) who was with Malév Hungarian Airlines since 1958. The co-pilot was Hungarian János Fenesi (born 1 October 1932). He had made 4135 flying hours, including 733 on a Ilyushin Il-18 aircraft and was with Malév since 1952. The other crew members were the navigator János Koleszár (born 1928), telegrapher Gyula Szücs (born 1933), mechanics János Gadácsi (born 1922) and István Bancsi (born 1931) and two flight attendants Júlia Ferencz (born 1938) and Mária Latabár (born 1942).

=== Passengers ===
There were 13 passengers on board. The passengers included Hungarian diplomats, who were flying to London to negotiate a British-Hungarian cultural treaty. Also on board the flight was French professor Louis Fruhling, born 1916 in Moselle, expert in the field of pathological anatomy. He was returning, together with his wife, from an international medical conference in Budapest. He was director of the Institute for Pathological Anatomy in Strasbourg.

== Accident ==
On 23 November 1962 the plane departed at 7:44 (GMT) from Budapest to Frankfurt. In Frankfurt the crew went at 9:50 to the meteorological office for two hours for briefing and checking French weather reports. The pilot noted the frequent occurrences of fog and stratus cloud, and the possibility of light icing. When departing from Frankfurt to Paris there were 13 passengers and crew on board. All passengers boarded in Frankfurt. The last radio contact was at 14:05. At the time it was very foggy in Paris. According to officials the plane initiated the landing on its instruments. During the approach to Paris with the landing gear extended and the engines nearly at full power the airplane crashed at 14:10, 6.1 kilometres east-north-east from the airport near the road from Paris to Soissons.

After impact the airplane exploded with high flames visible. Farmers from the area came to the disaster but could not do anything to help. Due to the heat, it was not possible to approach the airplane. Due to the snow and rain the field was so muddy that vehicles could not reach the disaster site. Because the place was difficult to reach, it took the fire brigade from Le Bourget three hours to arrive at the disaster scene. After the fire brigade extinguished the fire, all bodies could be recovered. Bodies had to be carried 500 meters to the nearest road. Because the bodies were charred, identification took a long time.

=== Weather conditions ===
Because of the dense fog most flights at Paris–Le Bourget Airport were cancelled during the morning. Only one aircraft had landed and four aircraft had departed.

=== Eyewitness accounts ===
According to eyewitnesses, the aircraft flew into high-voltage cables.

== Investigation ==
The accident was investigated by the Bureau of Enquiry and Analysis for Civil Aviation Safety (BEA).

In February 1964, the BEA published their findings. The investigation concluded that the aircraft had stalled while performing a high G-load manoeuvre. The BEA couldn't determine as to why this manoeuvre was performed.
