= Kőkút =

- Village
- Coat of arms

- Location of Kőkút
- Coordinates: 46.19182°N 17.57552°E
- Country: Hungary
- Region: Southern Transdanubia
- County: Somogy
- District: Kaposvár
- RC Diocese: Kaposvár

Area
  - Total: 20.23 km^{2} (7.81 sq mi)

Population (2017)
  - Total: 555
  - Density: 27.4/km^{2} (71.1/sq mi)
- Demonym: kőkúti
- Time zone: UTC+1 (CET)
  - Summer (DST): UTC+2 (CEST)
- Postal code: 7530
- Area code: (+36) 82
- NUTS 3 code: HU232
- MP: László Szászfalvi (KDNP)

Kőkút is a village in Somogy county, Hungary.
