= Ctětín =

- Municipality
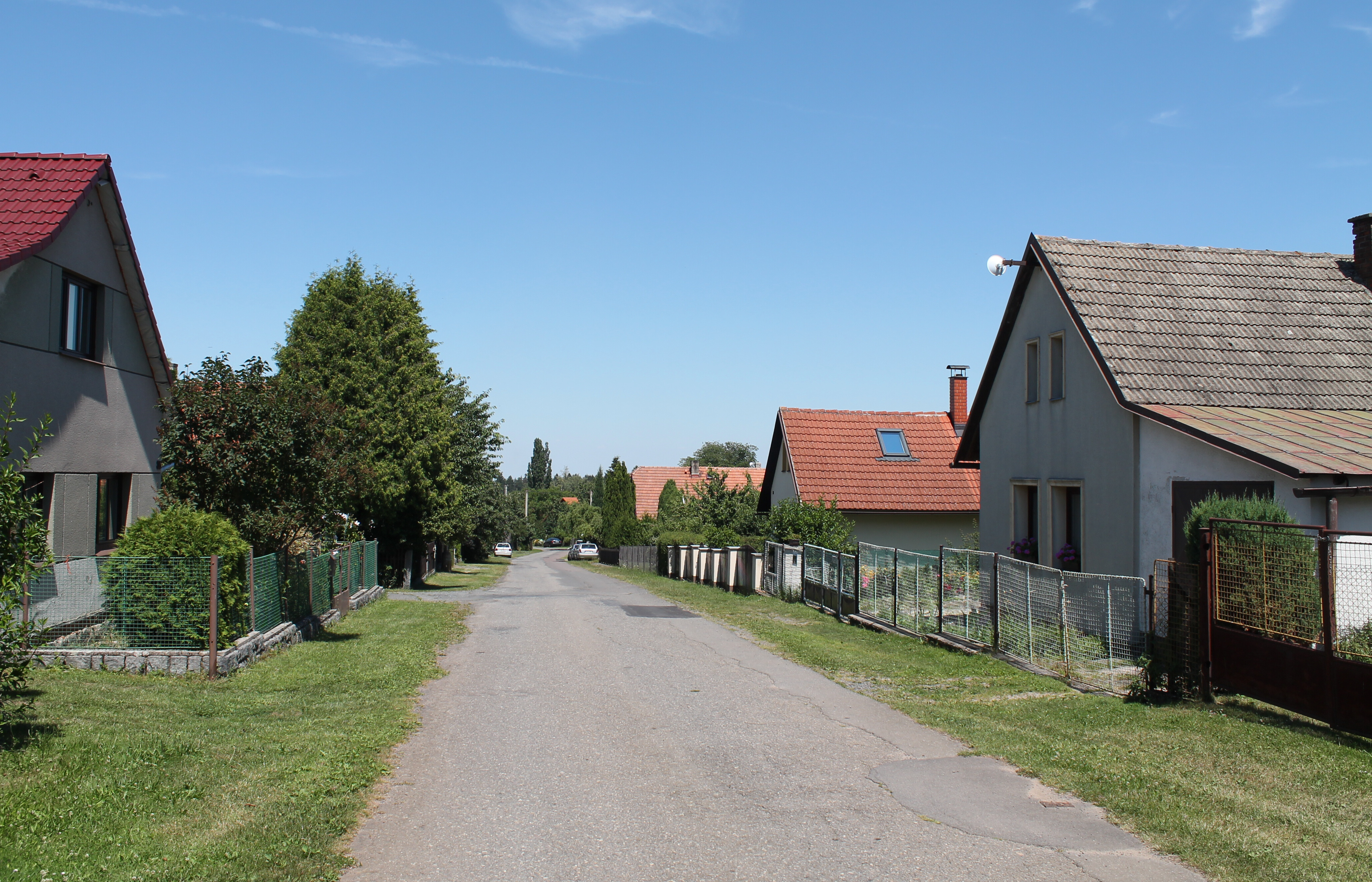
- Vranov, a part of Ctětín

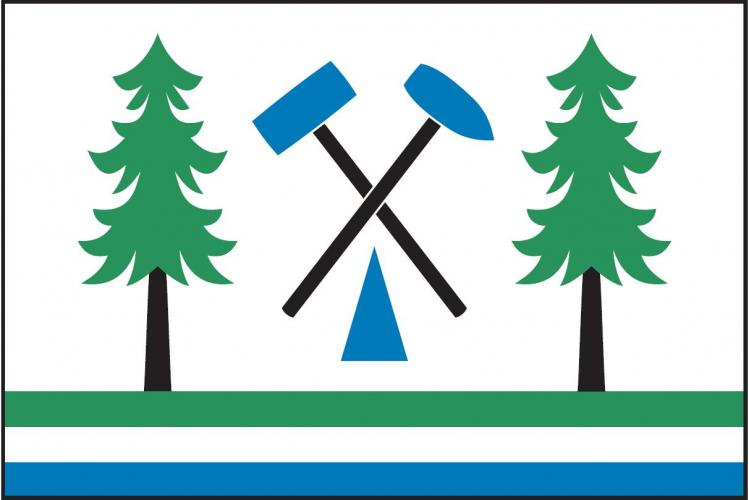
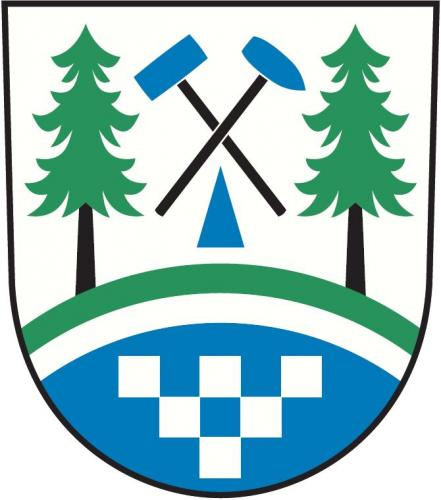
- Flag Coat of arms

- Location in the Czech Republic
- Coordinates: 49°49′49″N 15°50′22″E
- Country: Czech Republic
- Region: Pardubice
- District: Chrudim
- First mentioned: 1381

Area
  - Total: 7.53 km^{2} (2.91 sq mi)
- Elevation: 513 m (1,683 ft)

Population (2026-01-01)
  - Total: 261
  - Density: 34.7/km^{2} (89.8/sq mi)
- Time zone: UTC+1 (CET)
  - Summer (DST): UTC+2 (CEST)
- Postal code: 538 25
- Website: www.ctetin.cz

Ctětín is a municipality and village in Chrudim District in the Pardubice Region of the Czech Republic. It has about 300 inhabitants.

== Administrative division ==
Ctětín consists of four municipal parts (in brackets population according to the 2021 census):

- Ctětín (81)
- Bratroňov (73)
- Strkov (27)
- Vranov (65)

== Demographics ==
Historical population
Year	Pop.	±%
1869	744	—
1880	783	+5.2%
1890	772	−1.4%
1900	805	+4.3%
1910	892	+10.8%
1921	905	+1.5%
1930	879	−2.9%
1950	662	−24.7%
1961	662	+0.0%
1970	573	−13.4%
1980	457	−20.2%
1991	321	−29.8%
2001	274	−14.6%
2011	250	−8.8%
2021	246	−1.6%
Source: Censuses
