= Malév Flight 262 =

2000 aviation accident in Greece

Malév Hungarian Airlines Flight 262
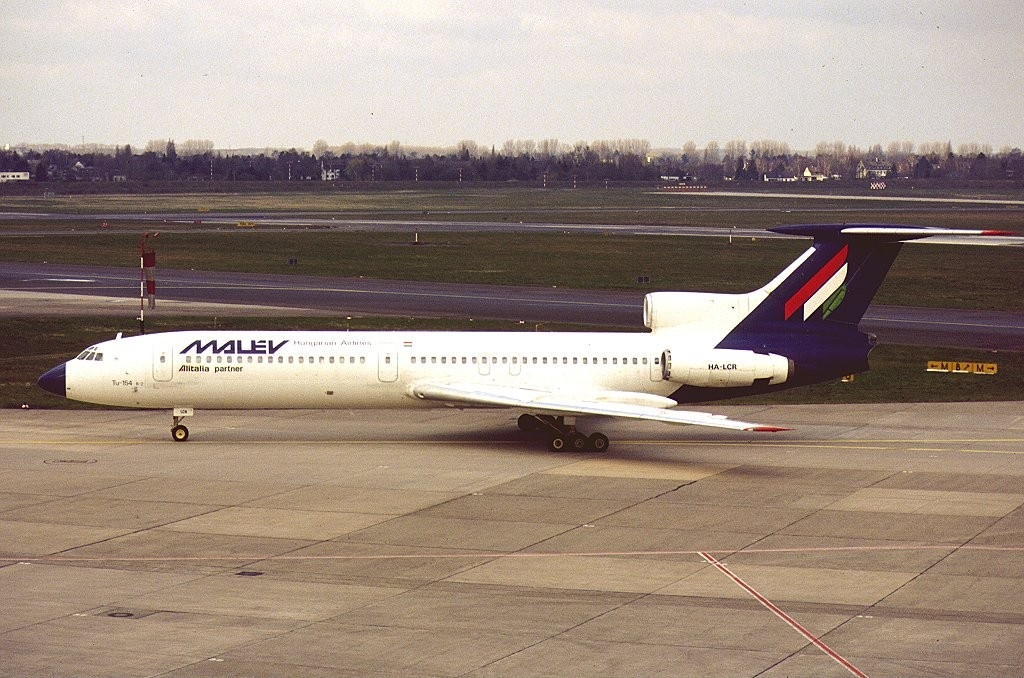
- HA-LCR, the aircraft involved in the incident, photographed in 1994

Accident
- Date: 4 July 2000
- Summary: Belly landing due to pilot error
- Site: Thessaloniki Airport, Thermi, Greece; 40°31′11″N 22°58′15″E

Aircraft
- Aircraft type: Tupolev Tu-154B-2
- Operator: Malév Hungarian Airlines
- IATA flight No.: MA262
- ICAO flight No.: MAH262
- Call sign: MALEV 262
- Registration: HA-LCR
- Flight origin: Budapest Ferihegy International Airport, Budapest, Hungary
- Destination: Thessaloniki Airport, Thermi, Greece
- Occupants: 94
- Passengers: 86
- Crew: 8
- Injuries: 0
- Survivors: 94

Malév Hungarian Airlines Flight 262 was a flight from Budapest Ferihegy International Airport to Thessaloniki International Airport. On 4 July 2000, a Tupolev Tu-154, belonging to Malév Hungarian Airlines, performed a gear-up touchdown during the landing at Thessaloniki, skidded on the runway, but was able to take off and land normally after a go-around. No injuries were reported.

== Before the incident ==
The aircraft normally used on this service was a Boeing 737-300. However, on the day of the incident, the intended aircraft (registration HA-LES) had an engine problem and was replaced with a Tupolev Tu-154, registration HA-LCR, at the last minute.

After a short flight from Budapest, the Tupolev started descent to its destination in very good weather conditions. The flight path followed the mountains and was only 100 m (330 ft) above the hilltops at times. The ground proximity warning system (GPWS), detecting such a low height, constantly warned the crew to lower the landing gear. Disturbed by the ever sounding horn, the flight crew switched the system off.

The airplane was approaching Thessaloniki without apparent problems but faster than usual. Due to that, it turned on to its final approach sooner than expected. At that time, the destination runway 28 was occupied by a Boeing 757, cleared to take-off. The Tupolev's pilot in command decided not to lower the landing gear and to perform a go-around.

Nevertheless, as the 757 started take-off, the captain decided to land. Due to extreme time constraints, the crew didn't have enough time to read the before-landing checklist. With deactivated GPWS, only the Tower ATC could warn the crew that the landing gear was up. However, since the Tupolev already had landing clearance, the tower controllers were busy departing the 757.

== First landing attempt ==
As the Tupolev came closer, Captain Peter "Trenky" Trenkner, sitting in his aircraft on the apron, noticed that the landing Tupolev didn't have its landing gear extended. He shouted into the radio several times: "Go around, Malev, go around!" (audible on the CVR recording).

The Malév 262 captain realized the problem and immediately ordered a go-around. Full throttle was applied, but, because jet engines react slowly, the aircraft continued its descent and hit the runway at a speed of 300 km/h (190 mph; 160 kn). The Tupolev skidded on the runway for 650 m (2,130 ft). As the engines spun up, the Tu-154 lifted off the ground, became airborne again and climbed out.

Malév 262 climbed to 1,000 m (3,300 ft) and tried to extend the landing gear. The airport was closed and the aircraft made a low approach above the control tower with lowered gear before attempting the landing again. After the initial touchdown and lift-off, the Tupolev was airborne for a further 16 minutes and 20 seconds.

== Second landing attempt ==
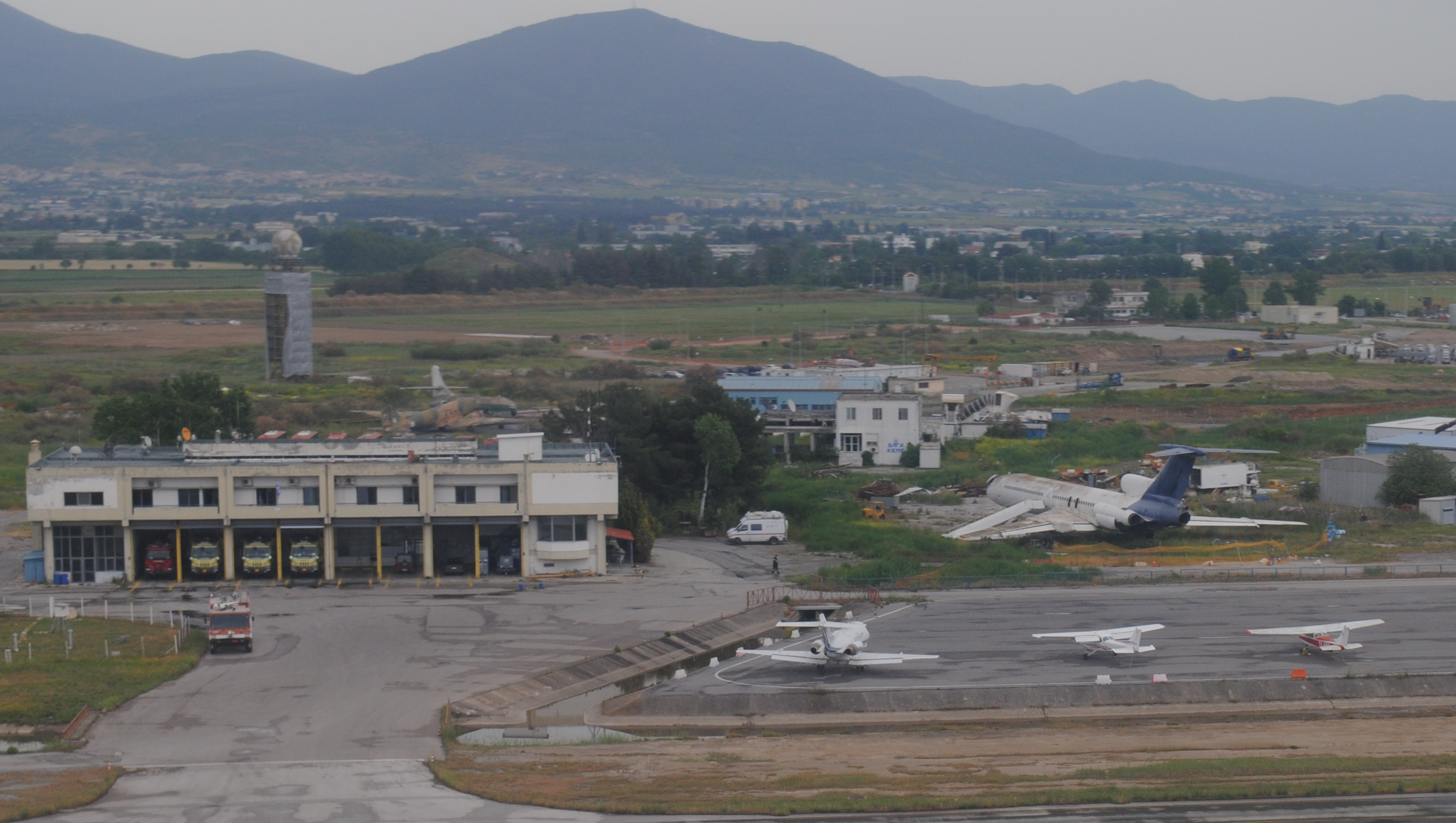
HA-LCR next to the airport fire station at Thessaloniki International Airport, in April 2018

The pilots landed the aircraft very smoothly, but were afraid that the landing gear would collapse and the plane would spin around and explode. The Tupolev carried enough fuel for the return flight to Budapest, therefore there were more than 30 tons of jet fuel on board. However, the landing roll went safely. The characteristic Tupolev's large landing gear pods, in which the wheels are retracted during flight, were used as sledges and shielded the landing gear, wing and flaps.

At the time of the incident Malév, the Hungarian national airline, was phasing out their old Tupolevs. Malév inspected the hidden damages of the involved aircraft and realised that it would be uneconomical to repair it, and donated the wreck to the fire department of the airport. For several years, the fire fighters of Thessaloniki airport were trained on the former HA-LCR. The plane was scrapped by the end of 2018.

== Similar accidents ==
- Pakistan International Airlines Flight 8303 - Crash after engine damages from accidental gear up landing at Karachi
