= List of airports in Bulgaria =

Locations of Bulgarian airports with international commercial airline services.

This is a list of airports in Bulgaria. It is a partial list of public active aerodromes (airports and airfields), grouped by type and sorted by location.

The Republic of Bulgaria is a country in the Balkans in southeastern Europe. It borders five other countries: Romania to the north (mostly along the River Danube), Serbia and North Macedonia to the west, and Greece and Turkey to the south. The Black Sea defines the extent of the country to the east. The country's capital city is Sofia. Bulgaria is divided into 28 provinces which are subdivided into 265 municipalities.

== Passenger statistics ==
Bulgarian airports with number of passengers served:

Rank	Airport	City	IATA / ICAO	2010	2015	2020	2024	2025	Change
1.	Vasil Levski Sofia Airport	Sofia	SOF / LBSF	3,296,936	4,088,943	2,937,846	7,922,702	8,407,483	▲6.1%
2.	Varna Airport	Varna	VAR / LBWN	1,198,956	1,398,694	622,215	1,557,016	1,865,319	▲19.8%
3.	Burgas Airport	Burgas	BOJ / LBBG	1,872,618	2,360,320	424,252	1,808,236	1,849,667	▲2.3%
4.	Plovdiv Airport	Plovdiv	PDV / LBPD	26,386	103,300	42,120	163,307	200,231	▲22.6%
5.	Gorna Oryahovitsa Airport	Veliko Tarnovo/ Gorna Oryahovitsa	GOZ / LBGO	1,177	495	95	126	78	▼61.9%
TOTAL				6,396,073	7,951,752	4,026,528	11,451,387	12,322,778	▲7.6%

== Airports ==
Airport names shown in bold indicate the airport has scheduled service on commercial airlines.

City served	Province	ICAO	IATA	DAFIF	Airport name	Coordinates
**Airports**						
Burgas / Sarafovo	Burgas	LBBG	BOJ		**Burgas Airport**	42°34′10″N 027°30′54″E
Gorna Oryahovitsa	Veliko Tarnovo	LBGO	GOZ		Gorna Oryahovitsa Airport	43°09′05″N 025°42′46″E
Plovdiv / Krumovo	Plovdiv	LBPD	PDV		**Plovdiv Airport**	42°04′04″N 024°51′03″E
Rousse (Ruse) / Shtraklevo	Rousse	LBRS	ROU		Ruse Airport (no scheduled passenger services)	43°41′41″N 026°03′24″E
Sofia	Sofia-oblast	LBSF	SOF		**Vasil Levski Sofia Airport**	42°41′42″N 023°24′22″E
Stara Zagora	Stara Zagora	LBSZ	SZR		Stara Zagora Airport (not operational)	42°22′36″N 025°39′18″E
Varna / Aksakovo	Varna	LBWN	VAR		**Varna Airport**	43°13′55″N 027°49′30″E
Vidin	Vidin	LBVD	VID	LB40	Vidin Airport (not operational)	44°01′20″N 022°48′58″E
**Certified airfields**						
Balchik (Balchic)	Dobrich	LBWB		LB25	Balchik Airfield	43°25′28″N 028°10′51″E
Blagoevo	Razgrad	LBBL			Blagoevo Airfield	43°27′19″N 26°25′54″E
Bohot	Pleven	LBBO			Bohot Airfield	43°18′23″N 024°41′29″E
Grivitsa (Grivitza, Grivica)	Pleven	LBGR			Grivitza Airfield	43°24′00″N 024°46′00″E
Dolna Banya (Dolna Bania)	Sofia	LBDB			Dolna Bania Airfield	42°18′31″N 023°49′13″E
Erden / Bojchinovci	Montana	LBRD			Erden Airfield	43°29′57″N 023°18′17″E
Izgrev / Kalimantsi	Varna				Izgrev Airfield	43°16′38″N 027°42′07″E
Ihtiman	Sofia	LBHT			Ihtiman Airfield	42°25′19″N 023°46′02″E
Kaynardzha	Silistra				Kaynardzha Airfield	43°58′13″N 027°28′10″E
Lesnovo / Elin Pelin	Sofia	LBLS			Lesnovo Airfield	42°38′04″N 023°38′47″E
Polikraishte	Veliko Tarnovo				Polikraishte Airfield	43°11′57″N 025°38′27″E
Primorsko	Burgas	LBPR			Primorsko Airfield	42°15′33″N 027°42′11″E
Dolni Rakovets	Pernik	LBSW			Sofia West Airport	42°26′36″N 022°59′00″E
**Other airfields**						
Kazanlak	Stara Zagora	LBKA			Kazanlak Airfield	42°35′41″N 025°25′13″E
Haskovo	Haskovo	LBHS	HKV	LB26	Haskovo Malevo Airport	41°52′18″N 025°36′17″E
**Military airports**						
Bezmer	Yambol	LBIA	JAM	LB44	Bezmer Air Base	42°27′17″N 026°21′08″E
Buhovtsi (Bukhovtsi)	Targovishte	LBTG	TGV		Buhovtsi Airfield (Targovishte Airport)	43°18′24″N 026°42′00″E
Cheshnegirovo	Plovdiv	LBPS		LB23	Cheshnegirovo Air Base	42°6′50″N 24°59′29″E
Dobrich	Dobrich-oblast	Z08K		LB43	Dobrich Air Base	43°36′34″N 027°50′11″E
Dobroslavtsi	Sofia-oblast	LBSD		LB20	Dobroslavtsi Air Base (Kumaritsa)	42°48′44″N 023°17′58″E
Dolna Mitropolia	Pleven	LBPL	PVN	LB41	Dolna Mitropolia Air Base	43°27′05″N 024°30′10″E
Gabrovnitsa	Montana	LBMG		LB15	Gabrovnitsa Air Base	43°32′39″N 023°16′21″E
Graf Ignatievo	Plovdiv	LBPG		LB21	Graf Ignatievo Air Base	42°17′25″N 024°42′50″E
Ravnets (Ravnetz)	Burgas	LBBR			Ravnets Air Base	42°31′37″N 027°16′05″E
Silistra	Silistra	LBSS	SLS	LB12	Silistra Airfield (Polkovnik Lambrinovo)	44°03′18″N 027°10′43″E
Sliven	Sliven	LBSL		LB17	Sliven Airfield	42°38′46″N 026°21′33″E
Haskovo	Haskovo	LBHS		LB14	Uzundzhovo Air Base	41°58′34″N 025°35′23″E

== See also ==
- Bulgarian Air Force
- Transport in Bulgaria
- List of Bulgarian Air Force Bases
- List of airlines of Bulgaria
- List of airports by ICAO code: L#LB – Bulgaria
- Wikipedia:WikiProject Aviation/Airline destination lists: Europe#Bulgaria
