= Chernevo =

Chernevo may refer to the following settlements:

- Chernevo, Bulgaria, a village in Suvorovo Municipality
- Chernevo, Kovrovsky District, Vladimir Oblast, a rural locality in Russia
- Chernevo, Vyaznikovsky District, Vladimir Oblast, a rural locality in Russia
- Chernevo, Cherepovetsky District, Vologda Oblast, a rural locality in Russia
- Chernevo, Velikoustyugsky District, Vologda Oblast, a rural locality in Russia
- Chernevo, Vologodsky District, Vologda Oblast, a rural locality in Russia
