= Blenika Peak =

Mountain in Antarctica

Location of Sentinel Range in Western Antarctica.

Map of northern Sentinel Range.

Blenika Peak (Bulgarian: връх Бленика, romanized: vrah Blenika, IPA: [ˈvrɤɣ ˈblɛnikɐ]) is the sharp rocky peak rising to 2,496 m (8,189 ft) just east of the main crest of northern Sentinel Range in Ellsworth Mountains, Antarctica. It surmounts Zhenda Glacier to the southeast and Skaklya Glacier to the north.

The peak is named after the settlement of Blenika in Southern Bulgaria.

== Location ==
Blenika Peak is located at 77°52′01″S 86°03′02″W, which is 3.53 km (2.19 mi) northeast of Mount Barden, 4.14 km (2.57 mi) south-southeast of Mount Reimer, and 10.02 km (6.23 mi) southwest of Mount Lanning in Sostra Heights. US mapping in 1961.

== See also ==
- Mountains in Antarctica

== Maps ==
- Newcomer Glacier. Scale 1:250 000 topographic map. Reston, Virginia: US Geological Survey, 1961.
- Antarctic Digital Database (ADD). Scale 1:250000 topographic map of Antarctica. Scientific Committee on Antarctic Research (SCAR). Since 1993, regularly updated.
