= Malasar Peak =

Mountain in Ellsworth Land, Antarctica

Location of Sentinel Range in Western Antarctica.

Map of northern Sentinel Range.

Malasar Peak (Bulgarian: връх Маласар, romanized: vrah Malasar, IPA: [ˈvrɤx mɐɫɐˈsar]) is the partly ice-free peak in Ellsworth Mountains, Antarctica rising to 2841 m on the side ridge that trends 9.15 km from Mount Dalrymple on the main crest of northern Sentinel Range east-northeastwards to Robinson Pass. It surmounts Embree Glacier to the southeast and Sabazios Glacier to the north.

The peak is named after the ancient and medieval fortress of Malasar in Southern Bulgaria.

== Location ==
Malasar Peak is located at 77°57′53″S 85°52′38″W, which is 2.26 km east-northeast of Mount Dalrymple, 10.15 km southwest of Mount Malone and 9.9 km west of Mount McKeown in Sostra Heights, and 8.53 km northwest of Mount Schmid in Bangey Heights. US mapping in 1961.

== See also ==
- Mountains in Antarctica

== Maps ==
- Newcomer Glacier. Scale 1:250 000 topographic map. Reston, Virginia: US Geological Survey, 1961.
- Antarctic Digital Database (ADD). Scale 1:250000 topographic map of Antarctica. Scientific Committee on Antarctic Research (SCAR). Since 1993, regularly updated.
