= Duridanov Peak =

Peak in the Ellsworth Mountains of Antarctica

Location of Sentinel Range in Western Antarctica.

Map of northern Sentinel Range.

Duridanov Peak (Bulgarian: Дуриданов връх, romanized: Duridanov vrah, IPA: [doriˈdanov ˈvrɤx]) is the sharp rocky peak in Ellsworth Mountains, Antarctica rising to 2453 m on the side ridge that trends 9.15 km from Mount Dalrymple on the main crest of northern Sentinel Range east-northeastwards to Robinson Pass. It surmounts Sabazios Glacier to the north.

The peak is named after the Bulgarian linguist Ivan Duridanov (1920-2005).

== Location ==
Duridanov Peak is located at 77°56′24″S 85°46′33″W, which is 5.67 km northeast of Mount Dalrymple, 2.48 km east-northeast of Nikola Peak, 6.65 km southwest of Mount Malone in Sostra Heights and 9.23 km northwest of Mount Schmid in Bangey Heights. US mapping in 1961.

== See also ==
- Mountains in Antarctica

== Maps ==
- Newcomer Glacier. Scale 1:250 000 topographic map. Reston, Virginia: US Geological Survey, 1961.
- Antarctic Digital Database (ADD). Scale 1:250000 topographic map of Antarctica. Scientific Committee on Antarctic Research (SCAR). Since 1993, regularly updated.
