= Foros Spur =

Ridge in Antarctica

Location of Sentinel Range in Western Antarctica.

Map of northern Sentinel Range.

Foros Spur (Bulgarian: рид Форос, ‘Rid Foros’ \'rid 'fo-ros\) is the 7.5 km long and 5.7 km wide rocky ridge forming the southeast extremity of Gromshin Heights on the east side of northern Sentinel Range in Ellsworth Mountains, Antarctica. It surmounts Rutford Ice Stream to the east and lower Vicha Glacier to the west.

The feature is named after Foros Point on the Bulgarian Black Sea Coast.

== Location ==
Foros Spur's southernmost height of 1020 m is located at 77°45′00″S 85°21′10″W, which is 12.96 km east of Mount Warren, 9.68 km southeast of Branishte Peak, and 11.3 km northeast of Mount Lanning in Sostra Heights. US mapping in 1961.

== Maps ==
- Newcomer Glacier. Scale 1:250 000 topographic map. Reston, Virginia: US Geological Survey, 1961.
- Antarctic Digital Database (ADD). Scale 1:250000 topographic map of Antarctica. Scientific Committee on Antarctic Research (SCAR). Since 1993, regularly updated.
