= Suvorovo =

Suvorovo Суворово Σουβόροβο
- Location of Suvorovo
- Coordinates: 43°20′N 27°36′E
- Country: Bulgaria
- Provinces (Oblast): Varna

Government
  - Mayor: Danail Yordanov
- Elevation: 246 m (807 ft)

Population (March 2023)
  - Total: 5,207
- Time zone: UTC+2 (EET)
  - Summer (DST): UTC+3 (EEST)
- Postal Code: 9170
- Area code: 05153

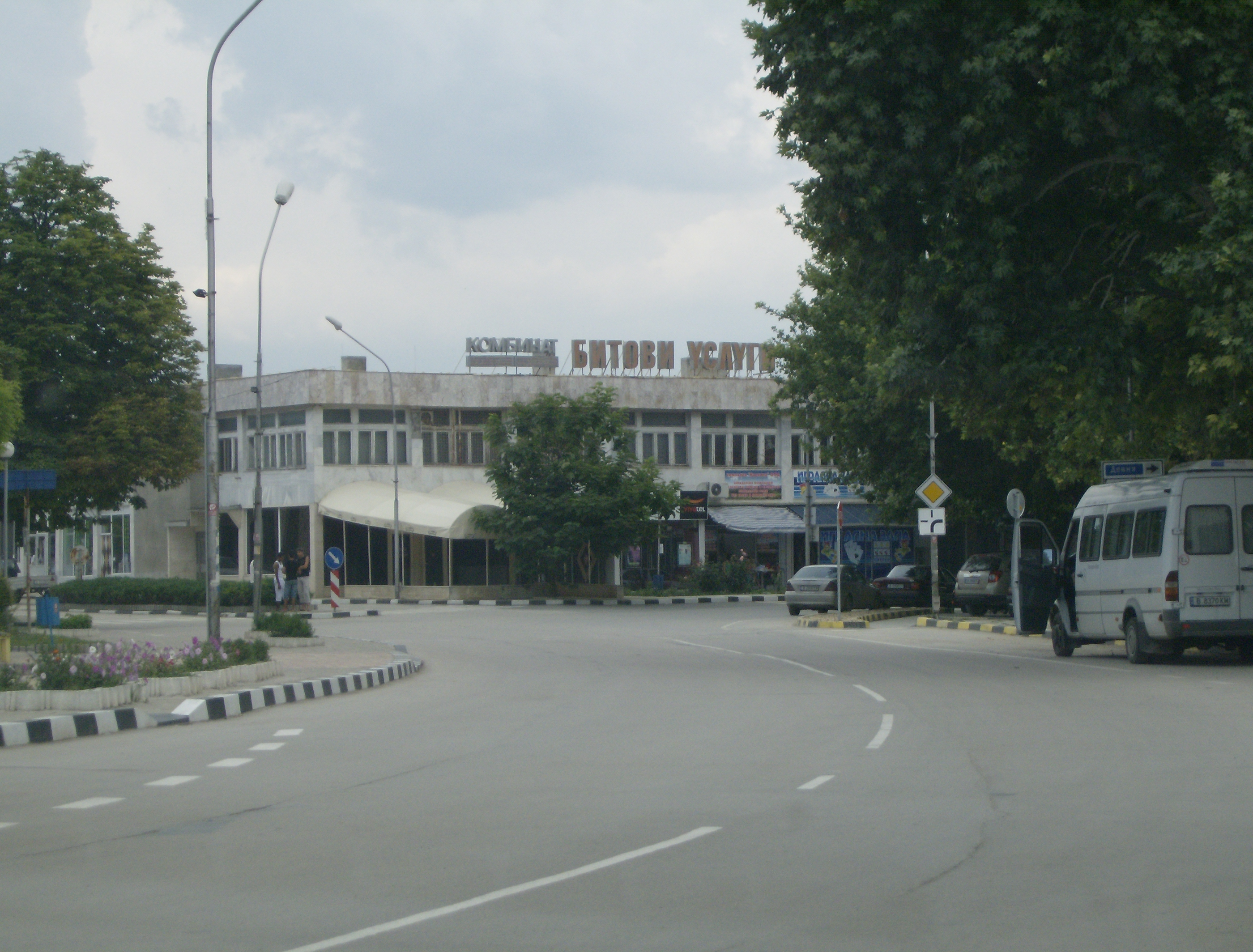

Suvorovo (Bulgarian: Суворово, pronounced [soˈvɔrovo]) is a town in northeastern Bulgaria, part of Varna Province. It is the administrative centre of the homonymous Suvorovo Municipality, which lies in the northwestern part of the Province. The town is located in the southwestern part of the Dobruja plateau, 34 kilometres (21 mi) northwest of the provincial capital of Varna, 56 kilometres (35 mi) southwest of Dobrich and 59 kilometres (37 mi) east of Shumen. As of March 2023, it had a population of 5,207.

Suvorovo was originally named Kozludža during the Ottoman era (Kozluca in modern Turkish), usually spelled Kozludzha or Kozludja (Bulgarian: Козлуджа); (Greek: Κοζλουτζά), meaning "place filled with walnuts" (kozlu); this name still persists in Turkish. In 1934 it was renamed Novgradets (Bulgarian: Новградец). Its present name is in honor of Generalissimus Alexander Suvorov, one of the famous Russian military commanders, who won a decisive battle of the Russo-Turkish War of 1768–1774 in the vicinity of the modern town. The town has a historical museum, a community centre (chitalishte), an Eastern Orthodox church dedicated to the Ascension of Jesus and a mosque.

== Municipality ==
Suvorovo municipality covers an area of 216 square kilometres (83 sq mi) (of which 61% arable) includes the following 9 places:

- Banovo
- Chernevo
- Drandar
- Izgrev
- Kalimantsi
- Levski
- Nikolaevka
- Prosechen
- Suvorovo

Notable natives of the municipality include Esoteric Christian spiritual leader Peter Deunov (born in Nikolaevka; 1864–1944) and Movement for Rights and Freedoms president Ahmed Doğan (born in Pchelarovo, but spent his childhood in Drandar; 1954-)

== Points of interest ==
Bulgaria's only 750 kV power substation is located just west of Suvorovo, at 43°18'52"N 27°30'25"E.
