= Ostrusha Nunatak =

Location of Sentinel Range in Western Antarctica.

Map of northern Sentinel Range.

Ostrusha Nunatak (Bulgarian: нунатак Оструша, ‘Nunatak Ostrusha’ \'nu-na-tak o-'stru-sha\) is the rocky hill of elevation 841 m projecting from the ice cap in the northeastern periphery of Sentinel Range in Ellsworth Mountains, Antarctica. It is named after the Thracian mound of Ostrusha in Southern Bulgaria.

== Location ==
Ostrusha Nunatak is located at 77°26′20″S 85°30′50″W, which is 16.75 km north-northeast of Mount Mogensen in Gromshin Heights, 12.43 km east-northeast of Mount Weems and 5.27 km south-southeast of Bohot Nunatak. US mapping in 1961.

== Maps ==
- Newcomer Glacier. Scale 1:250 000 topographic map. Reston, Virginia: US Geological Survey, 1961.
- Antarctic Digital Database (ADD). Scale 1:250000 topographic map of Antarctica. Scientific Committee on Antarctic Research (SCAR). Since 1993, regularly updated.
