= Polarstar Peak =

Mountain in Antarctica

Location of Sentinel Range in Western Antarctica.

Northern Sentinel Range map.

Polarstar Peak (77°32′S 86°9′W) is a peak rising above 2,400 m, standing 3 nautical miles (6 km) north of Mount Ulmer in Gromshin Heights on the east side of northern Sentinel Range in Ellsworth Mountains, Antarctica. It surmounts the head of Vicha Glacier to the southeast.

The peak was discovered by Lincoln Ellsworth on his trans-Antarctic flight of November 23, 1935. It was named by the Advisory Committee on Antarctic Names (US-ACAN) for the airplane Polar Star in which Ellsworth made the historic flight.

== See also ==
- Mountains in Antarctica
