= Nikola Peak =

Mountain in Ellsworth Land, Antarctica

Location of Sentinel Range in Western Antarctica.

Map of northern Sentinel Range.

Nikola Peak (Bulgarian: връх Никола, romanized: vrah Nikola, IPA: [ˈvrɤx niˈkɔɫɐ]) is the sharp, partly ice-free peak in Ellsworth Mountains, Antarctica rising to 2405 m in the side ridge that trends 9.15 km from Mount Dalrymple on the main crest of northern Sentinel Range east-northeastwards to Robinson Pass. It surmounts Sabazios Glacier to the north.

The peak is named after the Bulgarian rebel leader Kapitan Dyado Nikola (Nikola Filipovski, 1800–1856).

== See also ==
- Mountains in Antarctica

== Location ==
Nikola Peak is located at 77°56′40″S 85°52′48″W, which is 3.6 km northeast of Mount Dalrymple, 2.26 km north of Malasar Peak and 2.48 km west-southwest of Duridanov Peak. US mapping in 1961.

== Maps ==
- Newcomer Glacier. Scale 1:250 000 topographic map. Reston, Virginia: US Geological Survey, 1961.
- Antarctic Digital Database (ADD). Scale 1:250000 topographic map of Antarctica. Scientific Committee on Antarctic Research (SCAR). Since 1993, regularly updated.
