= Miller Bluffs =

Location of Sentinel Range in Western Antarctica.

Map of northern Sentinel Range.

The Miller Bluffs (77°35′S 85°45′W) are a line of steep, east-facing bluffs about 15 nautical miles (28 km) long which extend west-northwest from Foros Spur at the mouth of Newcomer Glacier, along the northeast side of Gromshin Heights in northern Sentinel Range, Ellsworth Mountains in Antarctica. The north end of the feature was photographed by Lincoln Ellsworth on his trans-Antarctic flight of November 23, 1935, and the bluffs were mapped by the United States Geological Survey in 1961 from air photos obtained by U.S. Navy Squadron VX-6 in 1959. The feature was named by the Advisory Committee on Antarctic Names for the Hon. George P. Miller, former chairman of the House Science and Astronautics Committee, whose great interest in Antarctic activities was of assistance in assuring successful completion of U.S. research of that continent, 1958–72.

== Maps ==
- Newcomer Glacier. Scale 1:250 000 topographic map. Reston, Virginia: US Geological Survey, 1961.
- Antarctic Digital Database (ADD). Scale 1:250000 topographic map of Antarctica. Scientific Committee on Antarctic Research (SCAR). Since 1993, regularly updated.
