= Vidul Glacier =

Glacier in Antarctica

- Location of Sentinel Range in Western Antarctica.

- Location within Antarctica
- Location: Sentinel Range
- Coordinates: 77°48′10″S 86°10′40″W
- Length: 4 nmi (7 km; 5 mi)
- Width: 0.7 nmi (1 km; 1 mi)
- Thickness: unknown
- Status: unknown

Map of northern Sentinel Range.

Vidul Glacier (Bulgarian: ледник Видул, romanized: lednik Vidul, IPA: [ˈlɛdniɡ ˈvidoɫ]) is the 7.5 km long and 1.4 km wide glacier on the east side of the main crest of northern Sentinel Range in Ellsworth Mountains, Antarctica. It is situated northwest of Skaklya Glacier and southwest of the middle course of Newcomer Glacier. The glacier drains the north slopes of Mount Reimer and the east slopes of Mount Dawson, flows northwards and joins Newcomer Glacier west of Mount Warren in Gromshin Heights.

== History ==
The glacier is named after the Bulgarian rebel leader Vidul Voyvoda (Vidul Vidulov, 1777-1833).

== Location ==
Vidul Glacier is centred at 77°48′10″S 86°10′40″W. US mapping in 1961.

== See also ==
- List of glaciers in the Antarctic
- Glaciology

== Maps ==
- Newcomer Glacier. Scale 1:250 000 topographic map. Reston, Virginia: US Geological Survey, 1961.
- Antarctic Digital Database (ADD). Scale 1:250000 topographic map of Antarctica. Scientific Committee on Antarctic Research (SCAR). Since 1993, regularly updated.
