= Bracken Peak =

Mountain in Antarticta

Location of Sentinel Range in Western Antarctica.

Northern Sentinel Range map.

Bracken Peak (77°51′S 85°24′W) is a peak, 1,240 metres (4,070 ft) high, standing in Sostra Heights south of the terminus of Newcomer Glacier and 3 miles (5 km) northeast of Mount Malone, on the east side of the Sentinel Range, Ellsworth Mountains, Antarticta. It surmounts Anchialus Glacier to the west and Vit Ice Piedmont to the east.

It was first mapped by the United States Geological Survey from surveys and from air photos taken by U.S. Navy Squadron VX-6 on photographic flights of 14–15 December 1959, and named by the Advisory Committee on Antarctic Names for H.J. Bracken, plane captain of the airplane on these flights.

== See also ==
- Mountains in Antarctica

== Maps ==
- Newcomer Glacier. Scale 1:250 000 topographic map. Reston, Virginia: US Geological Survey, 1961.
- Antarctic Digital Database (ADD). Scale 1:250000 topographic map of Antarctica. Scientific Committee on Antarctic Research (SCAR). Since 1993, regularly updated.
