= Skamni Saddle =

Location of Sentinel Range in Western Antarctica.

Map of northern Sentinel Range.

Skamni Saddle (Bulgarian: седловина Скамни, ‘Sedlovina Skamni’ \se-dlo-vi-'na 'skam-ni\) is the 1.3 km long ice-covered saddle of elevation 1750 m in northern Sentinel Range, Ellsworth Mountains in Antarctica connecting Mount Wyatt Earp on the northwest to Matsch Ridge in Gromshin Heights on the southeast.

The saddle is named after Skamni Point on the Bulgarian Black Sea Coast.

== Location ==
Skamni Saddle is located at 77°35′34″S 86°13′55″W, which is 4.6 km northwest of Mount Ulmer, 13 km east by south of the north extremity of the main ridge of Sentinel Ridge, and 12 km southwest of Kipra Gap. US mapping in 1961.

== Maps ==
- Newcomer Glacier. Scale 1:250 000 topographic map. Reston, Virginia: US Geological Survey, 1961.
- Antarctic Digital Database (ADD). Scale 1:250000 topographic map of Antarctica. Scientific Committee on Antarctic Research (SCAR). Since 1993, regularly updated.
