= Mount Cornwell =

Mount Cornwell may refer to:

- Mount Cornwell (Canada) on the British Columbia–Alberta border in Canada
- Mount Cornwell (Antarctica)
