= Vit Ice Piedmont =

Glacier in Antarctica

Vit Ice Glacier
- Location of Sentinel Range in Western Antarctica.

- Location within Antarctica
- Location: Sentinel Range
- Coordinates: 77°54′00″S 85°11′30″W
- Length: 6 nmi (11 km; 7 mi)
- Width: 3 nmi (6 km; 3 mi)
- Thickness: unknown
- Status: unknown

Map of northern Sentinel Range.

Vit Ice Piedmont (Bulgarian: ледник Вит, romanized: lednik Vit, IPA: [ˈlɛdniɡ ˈvit]) is the glacier extending 12 km in north-south direction and 6 km in east-west direction in Sostra Heights on the east side of northern Sentinel Range in Ellsworth Mountains, Antarctica. It is situated north of the end of Embree Glacier, east of Bracken Peak, southwest of Anchialus Glacier and south of the end of Newcomer Glacier. The glacier flows eastwards into Rutford Ice Stream.

The glacier is named after Vit River in Northern Bulgaria.

== Location ==
Vit Ice Piedmont is centred at 77°54′00″S 85°11′30″W. US mapping in 1961.

== See also ==
- List of glaciers in the Antarctic
- Glaciology

== Maps ==
- Newcomer Glacier. Scale 1:250 000 topographic map. Reston, Virginia: US Geological Survey, 1961.
- Antarctic Digital Database (ADD). Scale 1:250000 topographic map of Antarctica. Scientific Committee on Antarctic Research (SCAR). Since 1993, regularly updated.
