= Branishte Peak =

Mountain in Antarctica

Location of Sentinel Range in Western Antarctica.

Map of northern Sentinel Range.

Branishte Peak (Bulgarian: връх Бранище, romanized: vrah Branishte, IPA: [ˈvrɤɣ ˈbraniʃtɛ]) is the ice-covered peak rising to 1888 m in the southeastern portion of Gromshin Heights on the east side of northern Sentinel Range in Ellsworth Mountains, Antarctica. It surmounts Yamen Glacier to the north, Rutford Ice Stream to the east and Vicha Glacier to the southwest.

The peak is named after the settlement of Branishte in Northeastern Bulgaria.

== Location ==
Branishte Peak is located at 77°40′31.8″S 85°33′40″W, which is 11.45 km northeast of Mount Warren, 11.75 km east-southeast of Mount Washburn and 10.9 km south-southeast of Mount Mogensen. US mapping in 1961.

== See also ==
- Mountains in Antarctica

== Maps ==
- Newcomer Glacier. Scale 1:250 000 topographic map. Reston, Virginia: US Geological Survey, 1961.
- Antarctic Digital Database (ADD). Scale 1:250000 topographic map of Antarctica. Scientific Committee on Antarctic Research (SCAR). Since 1993, regularly updated.
