= Matsch =

Matsch is a name of Austrian origin that means "mud" or "slush". It may refer to the following:

== People ==
- Elisabeth von Matsch, (1380's — around 1439), last countess of Toggenburg
- Franz von Matsch, (1861 — 1942), Austrian artist
- Richard Paul Matsch (1930–2019), United States federal judge
- House of Matsch, Swiss and Austrian nobility, see de:Matsch (Adelsgeschlecht)

== Places ==
- Matsch Ridge, ridge in Ellsworth Land, Antarctica
- Matscher Tal ("Matsch valley"), valley in northern Italy

== Other ==
- Matsch (cards), a situation in certain card games where one side takes no tricks or scores few points.
