= Bohot Airfield =

Bohot Airport
- IATA: none; ICAO: LBBO

Summary
- Airport type: Public
- Serves: Bohot
- Location: Bulgaria
- Elevation AMSL: 817 ft / 249 m
- Coordinates: 43°19′47.6″N 24°39′2.6″E

Map
- Location of Bohot Airport in Bulgaria

Runways
Direction	Length		Surface
Direction	ft	m	Surface
09/27	4,020	1,225	Grass
- Source: Landings.com

Bohot Airport is a public use airport located near Bohot, Pleven, Bulgaria.

== See also ==
- List of airports in Bulgaria
