= Mount Ojakangas =

Mountain in Ellsworth Land, Antarctica

Location of Sentinel Range in Western Antarctica.

Map of northern Sentinel Range.

Mount Ojakangas (77°36′S 86°15′W) is an elongated mountain rising to about 2,450 m, 2 nautical miles (3.7 km) northwest of Mount Washburn in Gromshin Heights in the north part of the Sentinel Range, Ellsworth Mountains. It surmounts Vicha Glacier to the east and Newcomer Glacier to the west.

The mountain was named by the Advisory Committee on Antarctic Names (US-ACAN) in 1982 after Richard Ojakangas, a professor of geology at the University of Minnesota in Duluth, a member of the United States Antarctic Research Program (USARP) Ellsworth Mountains Expedition of 1979–80, and husband of Beatrice Ojakangas.

== See also ==
- Mountains in Antarctica

== Maps ==
- Newcomer Glacier. Scale 1:250 000 topographic map. Reston, Virginia: US Geological Survey, 1961.
- Antarctic Digital Database (ADD). Scale 1:250000 topographic map of Antarctica. Scientific Committee on Antarctic Research (SCAR). Since 1993, regularly updated.
