= Skaklya Glacier =

Glacier in Ellsworth Mountains, Antarctica

- Location of Sentinel Range in Western Antarctica

- Location within Antarctica
- Type: tributary
- Location: Ellsworth Land
- Coordinates: 77°51′00″S 86°02′00″W
- Length: 3 nautical miles (5.6 km; 3.5 mi)
- Width: 1 nautical mile (1.9 km; 1.2 mi)
- Thickness: unknown
- Terminus: Sabazios Glacier
- Status: unknown

Map of northern Sentinel Range

Skaklya Glacier (Bulgarian: ледник Скакля, romanized: lednik Skaklya, IPA: [ˈlɛdnik ˈskakʎɐ]) is the 3 nautical miles (5.6 km; 3.5 mi) long and 1 nautical mile (1.9 km; 1.2 mi) wide glacier on the east side of the main crest of northern Sentinel Range in Ellsworth Mountains, Antarctica. It is situated northwest of Zhenda Glacier and southeast of the head of Vidul Glacier. The glacier drains the south slopes of Mount Reimer and the north slopes of Blenika Peak, flows east-northeastwards and together with Zhenda Glacier joins Sabazios Glacier west of Mount Lanning in Sostra Heights.

The glacier is named after Skaklya Waterfall in Western Bulgaria.

== Location ==
Skaklya Glacier is centred at 77°51′00″S 86°02′00″W. US mapping in 1961.

== See also ==
- List of glaciers in the Antarctic
- Glaciology

== Maps ==
- Newcomer Glacier. Scale 1:250 000 topographic map. Reston, Virginia: US Geological Survey, 1961.
- Antarctic Digital Database (ADD). Scale 1:250000 topographic map of Antarctica. Scientific Committee on Antarctic Research (SCAR). Since 1993, regularly updated.
