= BIAF =

BIAF may refer to:

- Bulgarian International Air Festival, airshow festival
- Brighton International Animation Festival, Brighton animation festival
- Bangsamoro Islamic Armed Forces, Islamist group in Mindanao, Philippines
