= Mount Dawson =

Mount Dawson may refer to:

- Mount Dawson (Antarctica), in the Sentinel Range
- Mount Dawson (Canada), in the Selkirk Mountains in British Columbia

== See also ==
- Mount Dawson-Lambton, in Worcester Range, Antarctica
