= Izgrev Airfield =

Izgrev/Kalimantsi Airport
- IATA: none; ICAO: LBWK

Summary
- Airport type: Public
- Serves: Izgrev
- Location: Bulgaria
- Elevation AMSL: 1,168 ft / 356 m
- Coordinates: 43°16′38.5″N 27°42′9.2″E

Map
- Location of Izgrev/Kalimantsi Airport in Bulgaria

Runways
Direction	Length		Surface
Direction	ft	m	Surface
14/32	1,760	536	Grass
08/26	2,480	756	Grass
- Source: Landings.com

Izgrev/Kalimantsi Airport is a public use airport located 1 nm south-southeast of Izgrev, Varna, Bulgaria.

== See also ==
- List of airports in Bulgaria
