= Kazanlak Airport =

Kazanlak Airport Летище Казанлък
- IATA: none; ICAO: LBKL

Summary
- Airport type: Private
- Owner/Operator: Airport Kazanlak JSC
- Serves: Kazanlak
- Location: Bulgaria
- Elevation AMSL: 1,083 ft (330 m)
- Coordinates: 42°35′17.3″N 25°25′30.8″E
- Website: airfieldsbg.eu

Map
- Location of Kazanlak Airport in Bulgaria

Runways
Direction	Length		Surface
Direction	ft	m	Surface
16/34	1,969	600	Grass

Kazanlak Airport (Bulgarian: Летище Казанлък, romanized: Letishte Kazanlak) is a grass airfield which serves the city of Kazanlak. The airport is near the Ovoshtnik village, about 9 km south from the city center of Kazanlak. It is also known as Kazanlak Airfield.

Due to its good location, near the Shipka Top, Stara Zagora Spa Resort and Sevtopolis (Thrace capital), the airport is mainly active for crop-duster planes and some charters.

== See also ==
- Stara Zagora Airport
- List of airports in Bulgaria
