= Grivitza Airfield =

- Летателна площадка Гривица
- Grivitsa, Bulgaria

Site information
- Type: Airfield
- Open to the public: Yes

Location
- Location within Bulgaria
- Coordinates: 43°24′54.6″N 24°44′0.8″E

Airfield information
- Identifiers: ICAO: LBGR
- Elevation: 280 metres (920 ft) AMSL
Runways
Direction	Length and surface
09/27	1,158 metres (3,799 ft) Grass
- Source: Landings.com

Grivitsa Airfield is a public use airfield located 1 nm east of Grivitsa, Pleven, Bulgaria.

== See also ==
- List of airports in Bulgaria
