= Yamen Glacier =

Glacier in Antarctica

- Location of Sentinel Range in Western Antarctica.

- Location within Antarctica
- Location: Gromshin Heights; Sentinel Range; Ellsworth Land
- Coordinates: 77°38′20″S 85°31′00″W
- Length: 5.4 nmi (10 km; 6 mi)
- Width: 2 nmi (4 km; 2 mi)
- Thickness: unknown
- Status: unknown

Map of northern Sentinel Range.

Yamen Glacier (Bulgarian: ледник Ямен, romanized: lednik Yamen, IPA: [ˈlɛdnik ˈjamɛn]) is the 10 km long and 4 km wide glacier in Gromshin Heights on the east side of northern Sentinel Range in Ellsworth Mountains, Antarctica. It is situated northeast of Vicha Glacier. The glacier drains northeastwards along the north slopes of Branishte Peak and joins Rutford Ice Stream.

The glacier is named after the settlement of Yamen in Western Bulgaria.

== Location ==
Yamen Glacier is centred at 77°38′20″S 85°31′00″W. US mapping in 1961.

== See also ==
- List of glaciers in the Antarctic
- Glaciology

== Maps ==
- Newcomer Glacier. Scale 1:250 000 topographic map. Reston, Virginia: US Geological Survey, 1961.
- Antarctic Digital Database (ADD). Scale 1:250000 topographic map of Antarctica. Scientific Committee on Antarctic Research (SCAR). Since 1993, regularly updated.
