= Silistra Airfield =

Polkovnik Lambrinovo Airport
- IATA: SLS; ICAO: LBSS

Summary
- Airport type: Military
- Serves: Silistra
- Location: Bulgaria
- Elevation AMSL: 351 ft / 107 m
- Coordinates: 44°3′17.9″N 27°10′47.7″E

Map
- Location of Polkovnik Lambrinovo Airport in Bulgaria

Runways
Direction	Length		Surface
Direction	ft	m	Surface
09/27	8,210	2,502	Asphalt
- Source: Landings.com

Polkovnik Lambrinovo Airport (IATA: SLS, ICAO: LBSS) was an Air Base located 5 nm southwest of Silistra, Silistra, Bulgaria. It closed down in December 1999.

== See also ==
- List of airports in Bulgaria
