= Bohot Nunatak =

Location of Sentinel Range in Western Antarctica.

Map of northern Sentinel Range.

Bohot Nunatak (Bulgarian: Бохотски нунатак, ‘Bohotski Nunatak’ \'bo-hot-ski 'nu-na-tak\) is a rocky hill at an elevation of 885 m. It projects from the ice cap in the northeastern periphery of Sentinel Range in the Ellsworth Mountains, Antarctica. It is named after the settlement of Bohot in Northern Bulgaria.

== Location ==
Bohot Nunatak is located at 77°23′37″S 85°34′32″W, which is 13.7 km northeast of Mount Weems, 10.93 km east of Pastrogor Peak, 15.96 km southeast of Lanz Peak and 5.27 km north-northwest of Ostrusha Nunatak.

== Maps ==
- Newcomer Glacier. Scale 1:250 000 topographic map. Reston, Virginia: US Geological Survey, 1961.
- Antarctic Digital Database (ADD). Scale 1:250000 topographic map of Antarctica. Scientific Committee on Antarctic Research (SCAR). Since 1993, regularly updated.
