= Matsch Ridge =

Location of Sentinel Range in Western Antarctica.

Map of northern Sentinel Range.

Matsch Ridge (77°34′S 86°20′W) is a prominent ridge at an elevation of about 1,830 metres (6,000 ft), extending for 1.5 nautical miles (3 km) in a west-northwest direction from Mount Ulmer in Gromshin Heights on the east side of northern Sentinel Range in the Ellsworth Mountains, Antarctica. It is connected to Mount Wyatt Earp on the west-northwest by Skamni Saddle.

The ridge was named by the Advisory Committee on Antarctic Names in 1982 after Charles Matsch, Professor of Geology, University of Minnesota, Duluth, who as a member of the United States Antarctic Research Program Ellsworth Mountains Expedition, 1979–80, worked at this ridge.

== Maps ==
- Newcomer Glacier. Scale 1:250 000 topographic map. Reston, Virginia: US Geological Survey, 1961.
- Antarctic Digital Database (ADD). Scale 1:250000 topographic map of Antarctica. Scientific Committee on Antarctic Research (SCAR). Since 1993, regularly updated.
