= Krumovo =

Krumovo Крумово
- Village
- Location in Bulgaria
- Coordinates: 42°5′0″N 24°49′0″E
- Country: Bulgaria
- Province: Plovdiv
- Municipality: Rodopi

Government
  - Mayor: Stoyan Minchev (BSP)

Area
  - Total: 19,269 km^{2} (7,440 sq mi)
- Elevation: 160 m (520 ft)

Population (2015)
  - Total: 2,708
- Postal code: 4112
- Area code: 03116
- Vehicle registration: РВ

Krumovo (Bulgarian: Крумово) is a village in the Plovdiv Province, southern Bulgaria named after the Bulgarian Khan Krum. As of 2006 it has 3,378 inhabitants. The village is located at 2 km to the south of the Maritsa river and at 12 km to the south-east of Plovdiv. The Plovdiv International Airport is located in the vicinity of the village. It is also famous for its grapes sort Krumovski mavrud. Every 2 years the BIAF Airshow is held on the Krumovo Airbase, resulting in heavy parking problems in the village.
