= Ihtiman Airfield =

Ihtiman Airport
- IATA: none; ICAO: LBHT

Summary
- Airport type: Private
- Serves: Ihtiman
- Location: Bulgaria
- Elevation AMSL: 2,113 ft / 644 m
- Coordinates: 42°25′18.8″N 23°46′02″E

Map
- Location of Ihtiman Airport in Bulgaria

Runways
Direction	Length		Surface
Direction	ft	m	Surface
13/31	1,969	600	Asphalt
- Source: Landings.com

Ihtiman Airfield is a private airport for a public use airport located 2 nm west-southwest of Ihtiman, Sofiya, Bulgaria.

== See also ==
- List of airports in Bulgaria
