= Stara Zagora Airport =

Stara Zagora Airport Letishte Stara Zagora
- IATA: SZR; ICAO: LBSZ

Summary
- Operator: Airport Stara Zagora EOOD
- Serves: Stara Zagora
- Elevation AMSL: 643 ft / 196 m
- Coordinates: 42°22′36″N 25°39′19″E
- Interactive map of Stara Zagora Airport

Runways
Direction	Length		Surface
Direction	ft	m	Surface
17/35	8,366	2,550	Asphalt

Stara Zagora Airport (Bulgarian: Летище Стара Загора, Letishte Stara Zagora) (IATA: SZR, ICAO: LBSZ) is the airport of the sixth largest city in Bulgaria, Stara Zagora.

== Overview ==
The airport is located near the Kolio Ganchev suburb about 9 km south from the city center of Stara Zagora. Due to its good location, near Shipka Top and Sevtopolis, the airport is supposed to be mainly attractive for leisure charters. As of September 2025, Stara Zagora airport is non-operational.

== See also ==
- Kalvacha Airport
- List of airports in Bulgaria
