= Mount Dawson (Antarctica) =

Mountain in Antarctica

Location of Sentinel Range in Western Antarctica.

Northern Sentinel Range map.

Mount Dawson (77°46′S 86°21′W) is a sharp, pyramidal mountain located 4 km (2.5 mi) northwest of Mount Reimer in the north part of the Sentinel Range, Antarctica. It surmounts Vidul Glacier to the east.

The mountain was discovered by the Charles R. Bentley-led Marie Byrd Land Traverse Party, 1957–58, and named after Major Merle R. Dawson (d.1986), USA, leader of the Army-Navy Trail Party which established an oversnow route from Little America V to the site of Byrd Station in November–December 1956; Project Manager for Ship Operations in the Office of Polar Programs, National Science Foundation (NSF), 1965–70.

== See also ==
- Mountains in Antarctica
