= Dolna Bania Airfield =

Dolna Banya Airport
- IATA: none; ICAO: LBDB

Summary
- Airport type: Public
- Serves: Dolna Banya
- Location: Bulgaria
- Elevation AMSL: 1,778 ft / 542 m
- Coordinates: 42°18′30.7″N 23°49′13.5″E
- Website: www.airportdb99.com

Map
- Location of Dolna Banya Airport in Bulgaria

Runways
| Direction | Length | | Surface |
| Direction | ft | m | Surface |
|---|---|---|---|
| 09/27 | 2,526 | 770 | Grass-asphalt-grass |
- Source: Landings.com

Dolna Banya Airport (ICAO: LBDB) is a public use airport located 2 nautical miles east of Dolna Banya, Sofiya, Bulgaria. It is the first privately-owned airfield in Bulgaria. The airport features one single runway. It has one large hangar, together with an operations room, briefing room and other facilities. It also has one smaller hangar, three concrete/asphalt taxiways a main and a smaller apron and a refuelling station.

The airfield is mainly used for general aviation and private flights. It is one of the most active GA airfields in Bulgaria. LBDB airport is also the home base of RATAN Flight School, which is co-owned by the airport's operator.

== See also ==
- List of airports in Bulgaria
