= Mount Wyatt Earp =

Mountain in Ellsworth Land, Antarctica

Location of Sentinel Range in Western Antarctica.

Northern Sentinel Range map.

Mount Wyatt Earp (77°34′S 86°25′W) is a mainly snow-covered peak, 2,370 m, standing 3 nautical miles (6 km) west-northwest of Mount Ulmer in the north part of Sentinel Range, Antarctica. It is connected to Matsch Ridge and Mount Ulmer by Skamni Saddle.

The mountain was discovered by Lincoln Ellsworth on his trans-Antarctic flight of November 23, 1935. Named by the US-ACAN for the ship Wyatt Earp, used by Ellsworth in four expeditions to Antarctica between 1933 and 1939.
