= Mount Cornwell (Antarctica) =

Mountain in Ellsworth Land, Antarctica

Location of Sentinel Range in Western Antarctica.

Northern Sentinel Range map.

Mount Cornwell (77°40′S 86°9′W) is a mountain, 2,460 metres (8,070 ft) high, standing 2 miles (3 km) south of Mount Washburn in Gromshin Heights along the northeast side of Newcomer Glacier in the northern part of the Sentinel Range. It surmounts lower Vicha Glacier to the east and Newcomer Glacier to the west.

The mountain was named by the Advisory Committee on Antarctic Names for Lieutenant James W. Cornwell of U.S. Navy Squadron VX-6, who was co-pilot on photographic flights over the range on 14–15 December 1959.

== See also ==
- Mountains in Antarctica

== Maps ==
- Newcomer Glacier. Scale 1:250 000 topographic map. Reston, Virginia: US Geological Survey, 1961.
- Antarctic Digital Database (ADD). Scale 1:250000 topographic map of Antarctica. Scientific Committee on Antarctic Research (SCAR). Since 1993, regularly updated.
