= Mount Mogensen =

Mountain in Ellsworth Land, Antarctica

Location of Sentinel Range in Western Antarctica.

Northern Sentinel Range map.

Mount Mogensen (77°34′S 85°50′W) is a snow-covered mountain, 2,790 metres (9,150 ft) high, standing 5 nautical miles (9 km) northeast of Mount Ulmer in Gromshin Heights on the east side of northern Sentinel Range in Ellsworth Mountains, Antarctica. It surmounts Rutford Ice Stream to the east and the head of Vicha Glacier to the southwest.

The mountain was discovered by Lincoln Ellsworth on his trans-Antarctic flight of November 23, 1935, and was named by the Advisory Committee on Antarctic Names for Palle Mogensen, a scientific leader at South Pole Station in 1957–58.

== See also ==
- Mountains in Antarctica
