= Kipra Gap =

Pass in Antarctica

Location of Sentinel Range in Western Antarctica.

Map of northern Sentinel Range.

Kipra Gap (Bulgarian: седловина Кипра, ‘Sedlovina Kipra’ \se-dlo-vi-'na 'ki-pra\) is the 2 km long, ice-covered pass of elevation 1550 m in northern Sentinel Range, Ellsworth Mountains in Antarctica connecting Mount Weems on the north to Gromshin Heights on the south.

The saddle is named after the settlement of Kipra in Northeastern Bulgaria.

== Location ==
Kipra Gap is located at 77°30′10″S 85°57′20″W, which is 12 km northeast of Skamni Saddle. US mapping in 1961.

== Maps ==
- Newcomer Glacier. Scale 1:250 000 topographic map. Reston, Virginia: US Geological Survey, 1961.
- Antarctic Digital Database (ADD). Scale 1:250000 topographic map of Antarctica. Scientific Committee on Antarctic Research (SCAR). Since 1993, regularly updated.
