= Anchialus Glacier =

Glacier of Ellsworth Land

- Location of Sentinel Range in Western Antarctica

- Location within Antarctica
- Type: tributary
- Location: Ellsworth Land
- Coordinates: 77°51′50″S 85°24′30″W
- Length: 5 nmi (9 km; 6 mi)
- Width: 2 nmi (4 km; 2 mi)
- Thickness: unknown
- Terminus: Sentinel Range
- Status: unknown

Map of northern Sentinel Range.

Anchialus Glacier (Bulgarian: ледник Анхиало, romanized: lednik Anchialo, IPA: [ˈlɛdnik anxiˈaɫo]) is the 8.5 km long and 3.4 km wide glacier in Sostra Heights on the east side of northern Sentinel Range in Ellsworth Mountains, Antarctica. It is situated north of lower Embree Glacier, east of Sabazios Glacier, south of lower Newcomer Glacier and northwest of Vit Ice Piedmont. The glacier drains the northeast slopes of Mount Malone and the west slopes of Bracken Peak, flows northwards and joins Newcomer Glacier east of Mount Lanning.

The glacier is named after the ancient town of Anchialus in Southeastern Bulgaria.

== Location ==
Anchialus Glacier is centred at 77°51′50″S 85°24′30″W. US mapping in 1961.

== See also ==
- List of glaciers in the Antarctic
- Glaciology

== Maps ==
- Newcomer Glacier. Scale 1:250 000 topographic map. Reston, Virginia: US Geological Survey, 1961.
- Antarctic Digital Database (ADD). Scale 1:250000 topographic map of Antarctica. Scientific Committee on Antarctic Research (SCAR). Since 1993, regularly updated.
