= Gromshin Heights =

Heights in Antarctica

Location of Sentinel Range in Western Antarctica.

Map of northern Sentinel Range.

Gromshin Heights (Bulgarian: Громшински възвишения, ‘Gromshinski Vazvisheniya’ \'grom-shin-ski v&-zvi-'she-ni-ya\) are the heights rising to 2731 m at Mount Ulmer on the east side of northern Sentinel Range in Ellsworth Mountains, Antarctica. They extend 35 km in north–south direction and 20 km in east–west direction. The feature is upturned U-shaped with its interior drained by the south flowing Vicha Glacier, and its northeast side marked by the extensive Miller Bluffs. The heights are bounded by Rutford Ice Stream to the east and Newcomer Glacier to the south and west, and is connected to Mount Wyatt Earp on the northwest by Skamni Saddle, and to Mount Weems on the north by Kipra Gap. Their interior is drained by Vicha and Yamen Glaciers.

The heights are named after the settlement of Gromshin in Northwestern Bulgaria.

== Location ==
Gromshin Heights are centred at 77°38′00″S 85°46′00″W. US mapping in 1961.

== See also ==
- Mountains in Antarctica

Geographical features include:

- Branishte Peak
- Foros Spur
- Kipra Gap
- Matsch Ridge
- Miller Bluffs
- Mount Cornwell
- Mount Mogensen
- Mount Ojakangas
- Mount Ulmer
- Mount Warren
- Mount Weems
- Newcomer Glacier
- Polarstar Peak
- Skamni Saddle
- Vicha Glacier
- Vidul Glacier
- Yamen Glacier

== Maps ==
- Newcomer Glacier. Scale 1:250 000 topographic map. Reston, Virginia: US Geological Survey, 1961.
- Antarctic Digital Database (ADD). Scale 1:250000 topographic map of Antarctica. Scientific Committee on Antarctic Research (SCAR). Since 1993, regularly upgraded and updated.
