= Sliven Airfield =

- IATA: none; ICAO: LBSL

Summary
- Airport type: Military
- Serves: Sliven
- Location: Bulgaria
- Elevation AMSL: 656 ft / 200 m
- Coordinates: 42°38′43.1″N 26°21′31.4″E

Map
- Location of Sliven Airfield in Bulgaria

Runways
Direction	Length		Surface
Direction	ft	m	Surface
09/27	8,200	2,499	Asphalt
- Source: Landings.com

Sliven Airfield (ICAO: LBSL) is a military airport located near Sliven, Sliven, Bulgaria.

== See also ==
- List of airports in Bulgaria
