= Kaynardzha Airfield =

- IATA: none; ICAO: LBKJ

Summary
- Airport type: Public
- Serves: Kaynardzha
- Location: Bulgaria
- Elevation AMSL: 0 ft / 0 m
- Coordinates: 43°58′12.5″N 27°28′11.0″E

Map
- Location of Kaynardzha Airfield in Bulgaria

Runways
Direction	Length		Surface
Direction	ft	m	Surface
15/33	1,130	344	Concrete
- Source: Landings.com

Kaynardzha Airfield is a public use airport located 2 nm southwest of Kaynardzha, Silistra, Bulgaria.

== See also ==
- List of airports in Bulgaria
