= Gorna Oryahovitsa Airport =

Gorna Oryahovitsa Airport Летище Горна Оряховица
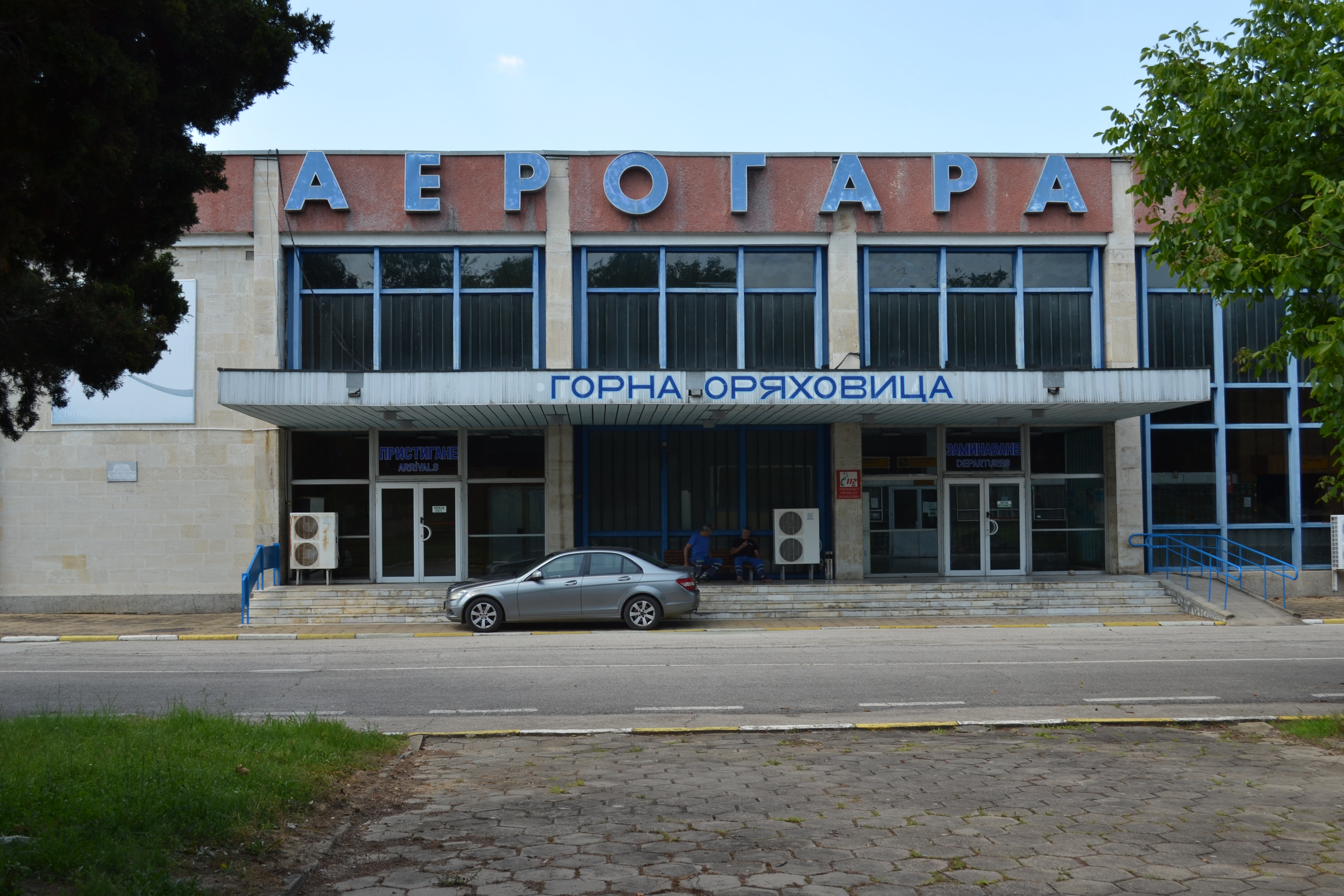
- The main entrance of the airport in 2023
- IATA: GOZ; ICAO: LBGO

Summary
- Airport type: Public
- Owner: State-owned
- Operator: Gorna Oryahovitsa Airport EAD
- Serves: Gorna Oryahovitsa
- Location: Gorna Oryahovitsa, Bulgaria
- Opened: 1925
- Elevation AMSL: 85 m / 280 ft
- Coordinates: 43°09′05″N 25°42′46″E
- Website: Official website

Map
- Location of airport in Bulgaria

Runways
| Direction | Length | | Surface |
| Direction | m | ft | Surface |
|---|---|---|---|
| 09/27 | 2,450 | 8,038 | Asphalt |

Statistics (2023)
- Passengers: 196
- Passenger change 22-23: ▲44.1%
- Aircraft movements: 1,524
- Movements change 22-23: ▼38.4%
- Cargo (t): 0
- Cargo change 22-23: ▲0.0%
- Source: Ministry of Transport and Communications - Directorate General „Civial Aviation Administration“

Gorna Oryahovitsa Airport (IATA: GOZ, ICAO: LBGO) is an international airport near Veliko Tarnovo, Bulgaria. It is used predominantly for cargo, as the last regular passenger flights to Sofia were abolished in the end of the last decade. The airport is believed to have a very good prospective, because of its location in the centre of the country, the lack of big airports nearby, and the huge number of tourists in the area coming from abroad. Currently, it is the least developed of the five international airports in Bulgaria in terms of infrastructure and services.

== History ==
The airport is established in 1925 and was originally used primarily by Bulgarian Air Force. In 1948 is opened a regular civil air route to Sofia, the third such in the country. The current track was completed in 1973 and has concrete construction, asphalt in 1982. In 1978, completed a new terminal and administration building, and in 1994, a new building for air traffic management. During the 1970s and 1980s, Balkan Airlines operated regular flights to Sofia and Varna. In 1995, the airport gained an international airport status and by opening its borders, customs and cargo divisions.
In 2002, the government decided to start a concession for the airport. By November 2011, there were three concession procedures ran by the government and were unable to find an operator for the airport.

In 2016, the airport was concessioned for 35 years after a decision by the Bulgarian government. The airport was sold to "Gorna Oryahovitsa Airport", in which two Bulgarian companies hold the shares.

== Overview ==
The airport has been equipped with a high intensity light system – First Category, for landing and taking off in conditions of poor visibility. There is a 5 stand apron that can accommodate large airplanes: Boeing 737, An-12, IL-76 and A 320.

Although there are no scheduled flights to and from the airport, there is a small number of charters and business jets using it.
Until 2002, the airport was used by the Bulgarian division of Ideal Standard as cargo hub for its Bulgarian production, but ceased operations due to changes in logistics.

As of December 2023, the current airport concessionaire "Gorna Oryahovitsa Civil Airport 2016" JSC announced an overall, general rehabilition and refurbishment plans including: runway extension, customisation security systems installations, approach lighting system and the construction of a perimeter road of the airport. The runway is expected to be 3km long, making it the third longest in Bulgaria after Sofia (3,6km), Burgas (3,2km) and longer than Varna (2,5km) respectively. The concessionaire had previously invested BGN 5,960,000. The new investment for the airport development in 2024 is anticipated to be BGN 13,300,000. A perimeter fence and video surveillance system are currently under construction and aimed to be finalised by the end of 2023.
Being located in the heart of Bulgaria, 12km away from the former capital of Veliko Tarnovo, would contribute to the local economy by serving the largest British community in the country, home to more than 20% of the expatriates. The community is dispersed within the Gabrovo and Veliko Tarnovo Province vicinities.

== Statistics ==
=== Traffic ===
Traffic at Gorna Oryahovitsa Airport
| Year | Passengers | Change | Cargo (tonnes) | Change | Aircraft movements | Change |
|---|---|---|---|---|---|---|
| 1998 | 98 | Steady | 14 | Steady | 212 | Steady |
| 1999 | 177 | ▲80.6% | 1,013 | ▲7135.7% | 1,381 | ▲551.4% |
| 2000 | 0 | ▼100.0% | 4,825 | ▲376.3% | 4,434 | ▲221.1% |
| 2001 | 336 | ▲33600.0% | 2,399 | ▼50.3% | 2,570 | ▼42.0% |
| 2002 | 249 | ▼25.9% | 660 | ▼72.5% | 3,620 | ▲40.8% |
| 2003 | 318 | ▲27.7% | 133 | ▼79.8% | 87 | ▼97.6% |
| 2004 | 314 | ▼1.3% | 302 | ▲127.1% | 3,759 | ▲4220.7% |
| 2005 | 331 | ▲5.4% | 600 | ▲98.7% | 4,031 | ▲7.2% |
| 2006 | 515 | ▲55.6% | 412 | ▼31.3% | 5,999 | ▲48.8% |
| 2007 | 301 | ▼41.5% | 59 | ▼85.6% | 8,266 | ▲37.8% |
| 2008 | 452 | ▲50.2% | 195 | ▲230.5% | 4,067 | ▼50.8% |
| 2009 | 234 | ▼48.2% | 352 | ▲80.5% | 3,553 | ▼12.6% |
| 2010 | 1,177 | ▲377.3% | 69 | ▼80.4% | 1,010 | ▼71.6% |
| 2011 | 562 | ▼52.2% | 19 | ▼72.5% | 1,351 | ▲33.7% |
| 2012 | 389 | ▼30.8% | 22 | ▲15.8% | 1,759 | ▲30.2% |
| 2013 | 18 | ▼95.4% | 0 | ▼100.0% | 48 | ▼97.3% |
| 2014 | 18 | Steady | 52 | ▲5200.0% | 108 | ▲4.0% |
| 2015 | 8 | ▲7.2% | 189 | ▲5.6% | 28 | ▼74.1% |
| 2016 | 22 | ▲175.0% | 0 | ▼100.0% | 26 | ▼7.1% |
| 2017 | 25 | ▲13.6% | 0 | Steady | 34 | ▲30.7% |
| 2018 | 388 | ▲1452.0% | 216 | ▲21630.0% | 1,073 | ▲3055.9% |
| 2019 | 235 | ▼39.4% | 130 | ▼39.8% | 1,386 | ▲29.2% |
| 2020 | 95 | ▼59.6% | 0 | ▼100.0% | 749 | ▼45.9% |
| 2021 | 0 | ▼100.0% | 0 | Steady | 126 | ▼83.2% |
| 2022 | 136 | ▲13600.0% | 0 | Steady | 2,472 | ▲1861.9% |
| 2023 | 196 | ▲44.1% | 0 | Steady | 1,524 | ▼38.4% |
| 2024 | 126 | ▼64.2% | 0 | Steady | 1,127 | ▼73.9% |
| 2025 | 78 | ▼61.9% | 0 | Steady | 2,007 | ▲178% |
Source: Directorate General "Civil Aviation Administration"

== Airlines and destinations ==
As of 2026, there are no scheduled services to and from Gorna Oryahovitsa Airport.
