= Mount Reimer =

Mountain in Ellsworth Land, Antarctica

Location of Sentinel Range in Western Antarctica.

Northern Sentinel Range map.

Mount Reimer (77°48′S 86°12′W) is a mountain, 2,430 m, in the northern portion of the Sentinel Range, standing on the south side of Newcomer Glacier 5 mi southwest of Mount Warren. It surmounts Skaklya Glacier to the southeast and Vidul Glacier to the north-northwest.

The mountain was named by US-ACAN for John D. Reimer of U.S. Navy Squadron VX-6, aerial photographer on flights over this range on Dec. 14–15, 1959.

== See also ==
- Mountains in Antarctica

== Maps ==
- Newcomer Glacier. Scale 1:250 000 topographic map. Reston, Virginia: US Geological Survey, 1961.
- Antarctic Digital Database (ADD). Scale 1:250000 topographic map of Antarctica. Scientific Committee on Antarctic Research (SCAR). Since 1993, regularly updated.
