= Chernevo, Cherepovetsky District, Vologda Oblast =

Chernevo Чернево
- Village
- Location within Vologda Oblast Location within Russia
- Coordinates: 58°59′N 38°16′E
- Country: Russia
- Region: Vologda Oblast
- District: Cherepovetsky District
- Time zone: UTC+3:00

Chernevo (Russian: Чернево) is a rural locality (a village) in Yugskoye Rural Settlement, Cherepovetsky District, Vologda Oblast, Russia. The population was 13 as of 2002.

== Geography ==
Chernevo is located 33 km (21 mi) southeast of Cherepovets (the district's administrative centre) by road. Viterzhevo is the nearest rural locality.
