= Vicha Glacier =

Glacier in Antarctica

- Location of Sentinel Range in Western Antarctica.

- Location within Antarctica
- Location: Sentinel Range
- Coordinates: 77°41′S 85°50′W
- Length: 15 nmi (28 km; 17 mi)
- Width: 3 nmi (6 km; 3 mi)
- Thickness: unknown
- Status: unknown

Map of northern Sentinel Range.

Vicha Glacier (Bulgarian: ледник Вича, romanized: lednik Vicha, IPA: [ˈlɛdniɡ ˈvit͡ʃɐ]) is the 27 km long and 6 km wide glacier in Gromshin Heights on the east side of northern Sentinel Range in Ellsworth Mountains, Antarctica. It is situated northeast of Newcomer Glacier and southwest of Yamen Glacier. The glacier drains southwards along the east slopes of Mount Ulmer and Mount Ojakangas, then turns southeast at Mount Washburn, flows east of Mount Cornwell and Mount Warren, and southwest of Branishte Peak, and together with Newcomer Glacier joins Rutford Ice Stream south of Foros Spur.

The glacier is named after the ancient and medieval fortress of Vicha in Northeastern Bulgaria.

== Location ==
Vicha Glacier is centred at 77°41′00″S 85°50′00″W. US mapping in 1961.

== See also ==
- List of glaciers in the Antarctic
- Glaciology

== Maps ==
- Newcomer Glacier. Scale 1:250 000 topographic map. Reston, Virginia: US Geological Survey, 1961.
- Antarctic Digital Database (ADD). Scale 1:250000 topographic map of Antarctica. Scientific Committee on Antarctic Research (SCAR). Since 1993, regularly updated.
