= Mount McKeown =

Mountain in Ellsworth Land, Antarctica

Coordinates: 77°56′S 85°31′W

Location of Sentinel Range in Western Antarctica.

Northern Sentinel Range map.

Mount McKeown is a mountain rising to 1,880 metres (6,170 ft) on the north side of Embree Glacier, 3 nautical miles (6 km) northeast of Mount Schmid, and forming the south extremity of Sostra Heights in the northern part of the Sentinel Range, Ellsworth Mountains in Antarctica. It was first mapped by the United States Geological Survey from surveys and U.S. Navy air photos from 1957 to 1959, and was named by the Advisory Committee on Antarctic Names for First Lieutenant Donald F. McKeown of the United States Air Force who participated in establishing the South Pole Station in the 1956–57 season.

== See also ==
- Mountains in Antarctica
