= Chernevo, Vologodsky District, Vologda Oblast =

Chernevo Чернево
- Village
- Location within Vologda Oblast Location within Russia
- Coordinates: 59°35′N 39°24′E
- Country: Russia
- Region: Vologda Oblast
- District: Vologodsky District
- Time zone: UTC+3:00

Chernevo (Russian: Чернево) is a rural locality (a village) in Novlenskoye Rural Settlement, Vologodsky District, Vologda Oblast, Russia. The population was 12 as of 2002.

== Geography ==
Chernevo is located 54 km northwest of Vologda (the district's administrative centre) by road. Vladychnevo is the nearest rural locality.
