= Lesnovo Airfield =

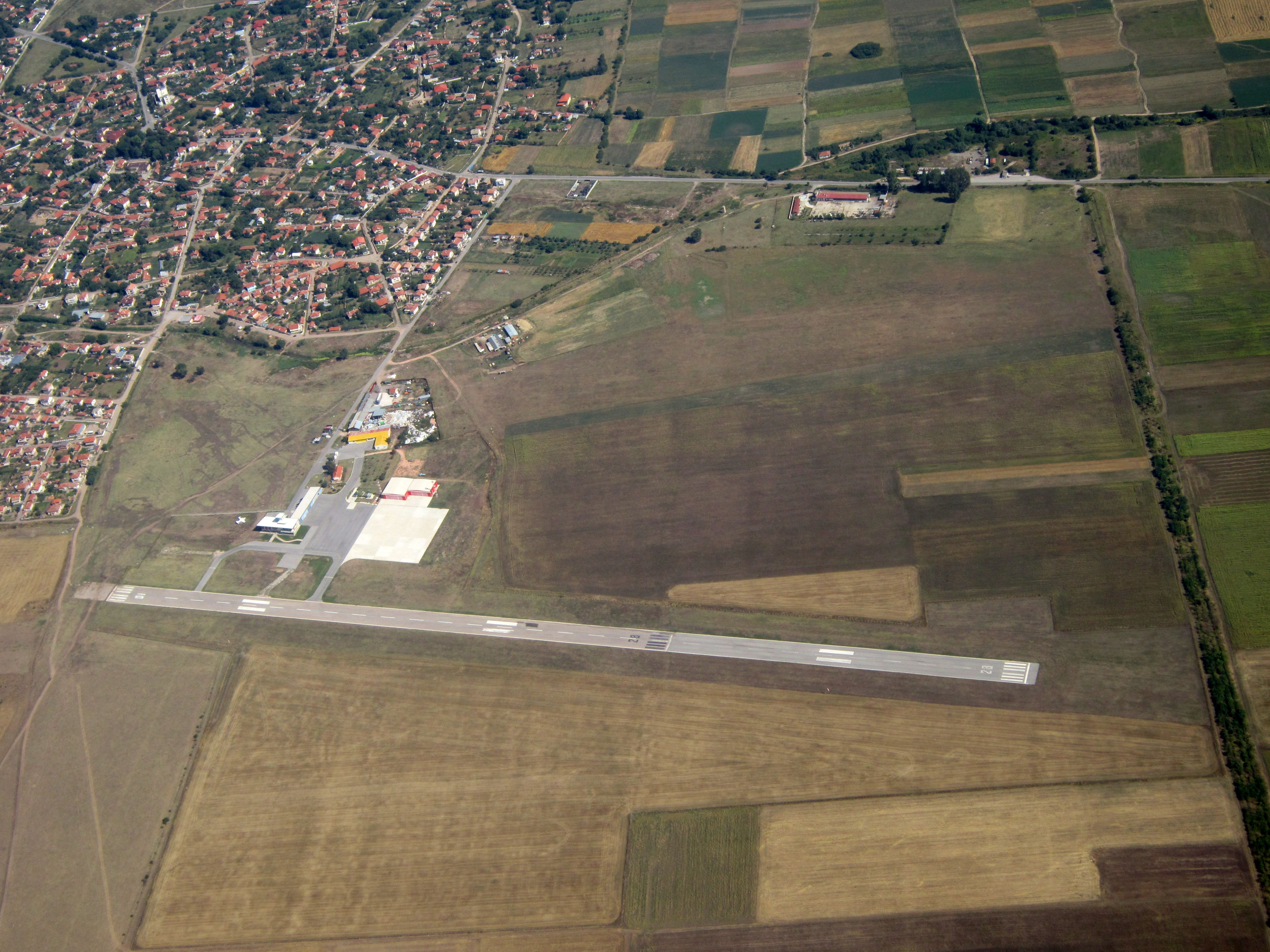
- IATA: none; ICAO: LBLS

Summary
- Airport type: Public
- Owner: Intersky AD
- Location: Lesnovo, Bulgaria
- Elevation AMSL: 1,824 ft / 556 m
- Coordinates: 42°38′04.2″N 023°38′47.2″E
- Interactive map of Lesnovo Airfield

Runways
Direction	Length		Surface
Direction	m	ft	Surface
10/28	1,164	3,819	Asphalt
- Source: Bulgarian CAA

Lesnovo Airfield (ICAO: LBLS) is an airfield in Lesnovo, Bulgaria. It is located some 22 km east of Sofia in the municipality of Elin Pelin. Until 1989, Lesnovo's airfield served as an agricultural airport. In 2001, the airport became the property of Intersky. The asphalt runway was extended and expanded to reach the present size of 910x25 m. As of fall 2013, Lesnovo Airfield has three hangars, an air traffic control tower, a restaurant and a hotel. In 2011, the airfield registered over 5000 aircraft movements.
