= Bulgarian International Air Festival =

Airshow festival

- Genre: Air show
- Frequency: Biennial
- Venue: Krumovo Airbase
- Country: Bulgaria
- Established: 2007

The Bulgarian International Air Festival (Български Международен Авиационен Фестивал / Balgarski Meschdunaroden Awiazionen Festiwal / Bulgarisches Internationales Luftfahrt Festival; BIAF (Bulgarian: БИАФ)) is an international airshow held on Krumovo Airbase, the military part of Plovdiv International Airport. It has been held every 2 years since 2007. The latest event was the 20th, 22nd, 27th, 28th, 29 September and the 2nd, 4th, 5th & 6 October 2013.

== BIAF 2011 ==
The theme of this year's show was 100 Years of the Bulgarian Airforce

The show was divided into 3 section :

- The Past : Albatros, Kaproni, Dar-1, Laz-7 and Ме-109.
- The Present : Galeb, Swiss Air Force PC 7 Team, BGR AF heute
- The Future : JAS 39 Grippen, Eurofighter Typhoon and MiG-29OVT.

As usual several neighbouring and coalition countries took part in the show with their Airforces.

Dynamic display from:

- Bulgarian Air Force – G 21, MiG 29A, PC9M, C 27J, Mi 17, Mi 24, Bell 206, AS 532AL, SU 25K
- Swiss Air Force – PC 7 Team
- Bulgarian Air Sport Ltd : Pitts – S2B LZ–AIR, Piper Dakota Turbo PA-28-201T
- Bulgarian organization for flight education Ratan LZ-TSA – Sting 2000 RG; LZ-RSS – Sting 2000; LZ-HPM – Sting 2000
- Romanian Air Force – IAR 99 SOIM
- German Air Force – EF Typhoon
- Russia, RSK MiG – MiG 29M ОVT

Static display from:

- Bulgarian Air Force – Mi 17, C-27J, PC 9M, SU 25 UBK, AS 532AL, MiG 21, MiG 29 UB
- Bulgarian Association of Light Aviation
- Bulgarian Aeromodeling Federation
- АК Galeb, Serbia – Galeb
- Flying club "Hawks", Romania
- Swedish Air Force - Gripen JAS 39
- Romanian Air Force – C 27J
- Italian Air Force – EF Typhoon
- Greek Air Force – Т 6
- German Air Force – С160 Transall

== Gold Sponsors ==
with their own pavilion

- SAAB – Sweden
- EADS / CASSIDIAN – Germany
- Lockheed Martin – USA
- Diehl Defence- Germany
