= Mount Lanning =

Mountain in Ellsworth Land, Antarctica

Location of Sentinel Range in Western Antarctica.

Northern Sentinel Range map.

Mount Lanning (77°47′S 85°45′W) is a mountain, 1,820 metres (5,970 ft) high, located at the south side of Newcomer Glacier, 5 nautical miles (9 km) southeast of Mount Warren, in the northern portion of the Sentinel Range, Ellsworth Mountains, Antarctica. It forms the north extremity of Sostra Heights, and surmounts Sabazios Glacier to the southwest and Anchialus Glacier to the southeast.

The mountain was first mapped by the United States Geological Survey from surveys and U.S. Navy air photos from 1957 to 1959, and was named by the Advisory Committee on Antarctic Names for 1st Lieutenant Delmar L. Lanning of the United States Air Force who participated in establishing South Pole Station in the 1956–57 season.

== See also ==
- Mountains in Antarctica

== Maps ==
- Newcomer Glacier. Scale 1:250 000 topographic map. Reston, Virginia: US Geological Survey, 1961.
- Antarctic Digital Database (ADD). Scale 1:250000 topographic map of Antarctica. Scientific Committee on Antarctic Research (SCAR). Since 1993, regularly updated.
