= Chernevo, Velikoustyugsky District, Vologda Oblast =

Chernevo Чернево
- Village
- Location within Vologda Oblast Location within Russia
- Coordinates: 60°30′N 46°38′E
- Country: Russia
- Region: Vologda Oblast
- District: Velikoustyugsky District
- Time zone: UTC+3:00

Chernevo (Russian: Чернево) is a rural locality (a village) and the administrative center of Orlovskoye Rural Settlement, Velikoustyugsky District, Vologda Oblast, Russia. The population was 318 as of 2002.

== Geography ==
Chernevo is located 66 km southeast of Veliky Ustyug (the district's administrative centre) by road. Podborye is the nearest rural locality.
