= Suvorovo Municipality =

Suvorovo Municipality Община Суворово
- Municipality
- Coat of arms

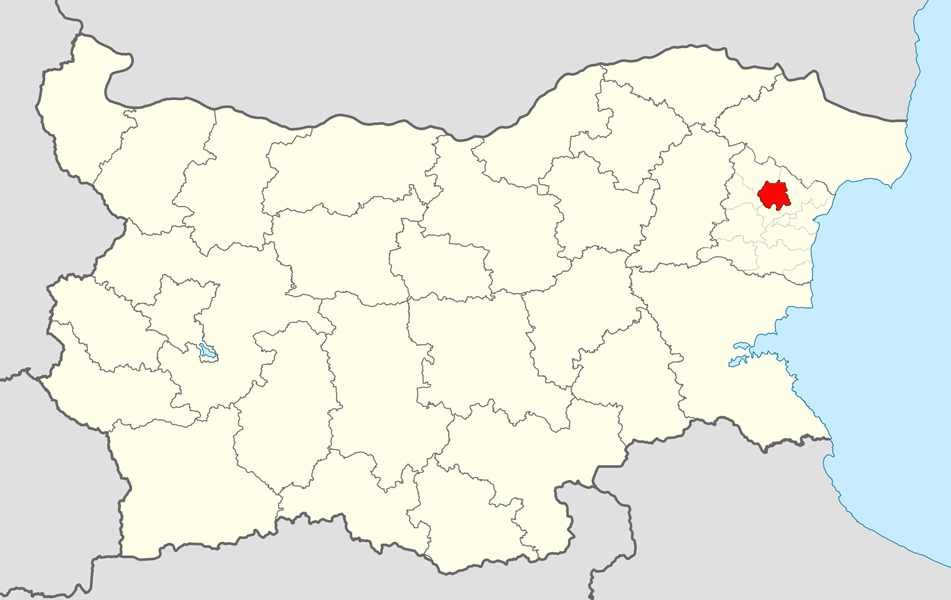
- Suvorovo Municipality within Bulgaria and Varna Province.
- Coordinates: 43°19′N 27°37′E
- Country: Bulgaria
- Province (Oblast): Varna
- Admin. centre (Obshtinski tsentar): Suvorovo

Area
  - Total: 216 km^{2} (83 sq mi)

Population (December 2009)
  - Total: 7,544
  - Density: 34.9/km^{2} (90.5/sq mi)
- Time zone: UTC+2 (EET)
  - Summer (DST): UTC+3 (EEST)

Suvorovo Municipality (Bulgarian: Община Суворово) is a municipality (obshtina) in Varna Province, Northeastern Bulgaria, not far from the Bulgarian Black Sea Coast. It is named after its administrative centre – the town of Suvorovo.

The municipality embraces a territory of 216 km^{2} (83 sq mi) with a population of 7,544 inhabitants, as of December 2009.

== Settlements ==
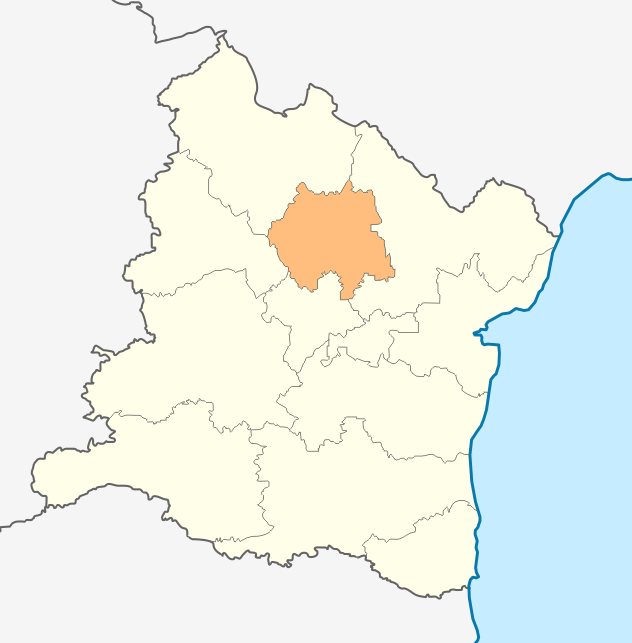
Suvorovo Municipality within Varna Province

Suvorovo Municipality includes the following 9 places (towns are shown in bold):

Town/Village	Cyrillic	Population (December 2009)
**Suvorovo**	**Суворово**	4,723
Banovo	Баново	137
Chernevo	Чернево	1,386
Drandar	Дръндар	185
Izgrev	Изгрев	210
Kalimantsi	Калиманци	214
Levski	Левски	173
Nikolaevka	Николаевка	494
Prosechen	Просечен	22
Total		7,544

== Demography ==
The following table shows the change of the population during the last four decades.

Suvorovo Municipality
**Year**	1975	1985	1992	**2001**	2005	2007	2009	**2011**
**Population**	9,410	8,273	7,913	7,658	7,115	7,293	7,544	...
Sources: Census 2001, Census 2011, „pop-stat.mashke.org“,

=== Religion ===
According to the latest Bulgarian census of 2011, the religious composition, among those who answered the optional question on religious identification, was the following:

Religious composition of Suvorovo Municipality
Orthodox Christianity	59.7%
Catholicism	0.3%
Protestantism	0.8%
Islam	17.9%
No religion	5.3%
Prefer not to answer, others and indefinable	16.0%

A majority of the population of Suvorovo Municipality identify themselves as Christians. At the 2011 census, 59.7% of respondents identified as Orthodox Christians belonging to the Bulgarian Orthodox Church. Muslims constitute the largest minority with 17.9% of the population.

== See also ==
- Provinces of Bulgaria
- Municipalities of Bulgaria
- List of cities and towns in Bulgaria
