= Plovdiv Airport =

Plovdiv Airport Летище Пловдив

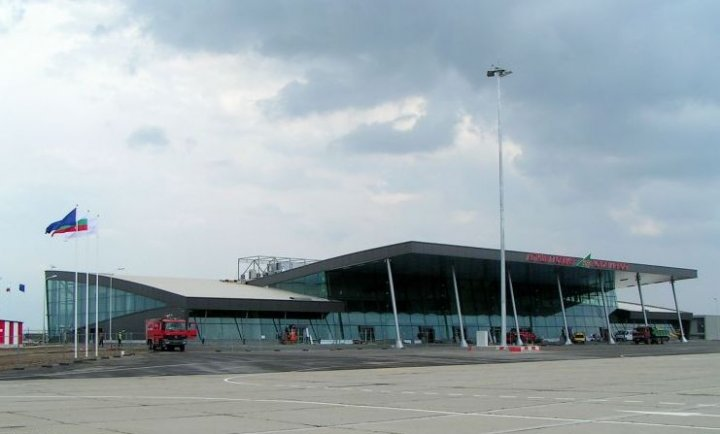
- IATA: PDV; ICAO: LBPD

Summary
- Airport type: Public
- Operator: Plovdiv Airport JSC
- Serves: Plovdiv
- Location: Krumovo, Bulgaria
- Opened: 1928
- Elevation AMSL: 182 m (597 ft)
- Coordinates: 42°04′04″N 024°51′53″E
- Website: www.plovdivairport.com

Map
- Location of airport in Bulgaria

Runways
Direction	Length		Surface
Direction	m	ft	Surface
12/30	2,500	8,202	Concrete

Statistics (2023)
- Passengers: 183,988
- Passenger change 22-23: ▼17.0%
- Aircraft movements: 3,408
- Movements change 22-23: ▼28.4%
- Cargo (t): 26
- Cargo change 22-23: ▲62.5%
- Source: Bulgarian AIP at EUROCONTROL

Plovdiv Airport (IATA: PDV, ICAO: LBPD) (Bulgarian: Летище Пловдив, romanized: Letishte Plovdiv) is an airport serving Plovdiv, the second largest city in Bulgaria, and is the country's 4th busiest airport. It is sometimes referred to as Plovdiv Krumovo Airport, after a small village located 6 km south-east away from the city on the main Plovdiv-Asenovgrad second class road.

Plovdiv Airport serves the nearby ski resorts of Bansko, Pamporovo and Borovets, and therefore serves mainly charter flights, during the winter season from the end of December until March. The main traffic at present is charter flights to and from the United Kingdom and Germany. The airport also plays a vital role in case of emergencies and is sometimes used as an alternate for Sofia Airport, which is almost 150 km away or 1.5-hour drive on the Trakiya motorway.

== History ==
The beginning of civil aviation at Plovdiv came with the first test flight between Sofia-Plovdiv-Yambol and Burgas early in 1928. In 1947, interim civilian flights between Sofia and Plovdiv were carried out.

On 2 October 1947, the regional newspaper Fatherland Voice reported that over a period of 45 days 1,500 passengers were carried, noting that the flights were always on time. In May 1948, regular service began between Sofia-Plovdiv-Bourgas and Varna. The same period also saw the former Fifth Air Regiment getting established at the airport, and a ticket office was put into use. The first flight was carried out by the airline Balkan Bulgarian Airlines. During the Fair Plovdiv, the airport served an average of 25 flights per day.

On 2 May 1962, airport operations moved to the Graf Ignatievo Airbase north of the city. At Plovdiv major restructuring of the airport facilities was carried out. One year later the regional newspaper "Fatherland Voice" published an article with the heading: "He has TRACK OF AIRPORT Plovdiv". In the same article the public was informed of the expansion of charter flights by Balkan Bulgarian Airlines to such destinations as Berlin, Moscow, Prague, and Vienna; the flights were carried out with aircraft types IL-18, TU-104 and TU-114.

On 13 September 1965, a new terminal building was opened, and next year, an enlarged tarmac was put into use in time for winter season charter traffic.

During these first years at the new location on the north-west perimeter of the airport, the airport serves scheduled domestic passenger flights to Bourgas, Varna, Targovishte, Rousse, Sofia and Gorna Oryahovitsa, with mainly IL-14 aircraft.

In the 1970s, the airport underwent considerable improvement and cargo airline Aeroflot Cargo began regular operation with IL-18, AN-12 and Tupolev Tu-154. In 1972 more than 5,000 tons of air cargo went through the airport. On 18 April 1978, an IL-76 landed at the airport, with a gross cargo payload capacity of 40 metric tons.

Domestic scheduled flights were terminated in 1980, but winter charter flights continue to increase which again leads to a relocation of ground facilities as technical buildings, power supply facilities, air traffic control tower and administrative facilities.

On 18 December 1982, the first aircraft TU-134 arrived, a charter flight from Amsterdam, the beginning of a new era for Plovdiv Airport. It is followed by the arrival on 3 November 2010 by a Boeing 737-800 arriving from London Stansted Airport, opening a year-round international passenger service to and from Plovdiv Airport.

On 25 December 2009, the first service to a scheduled destination, Moscow, started. This was the first scheduled flight since 1981. The airport handled 103,300 passengers in 2015.

== Reconstruction ==
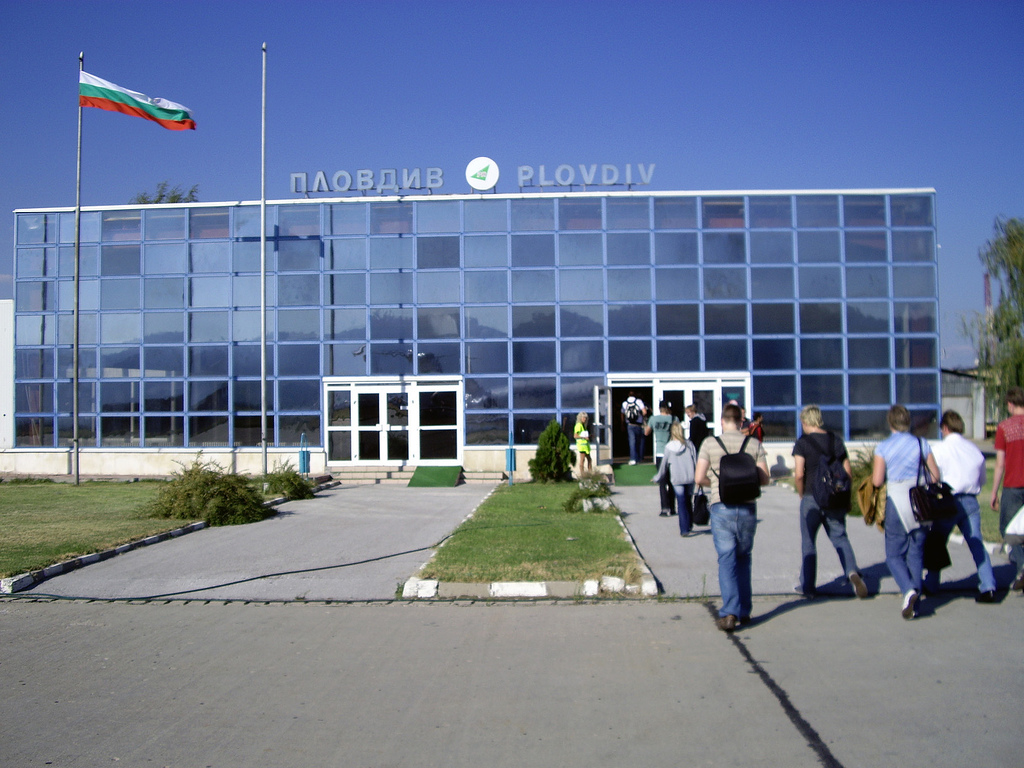
The old passenger terminal

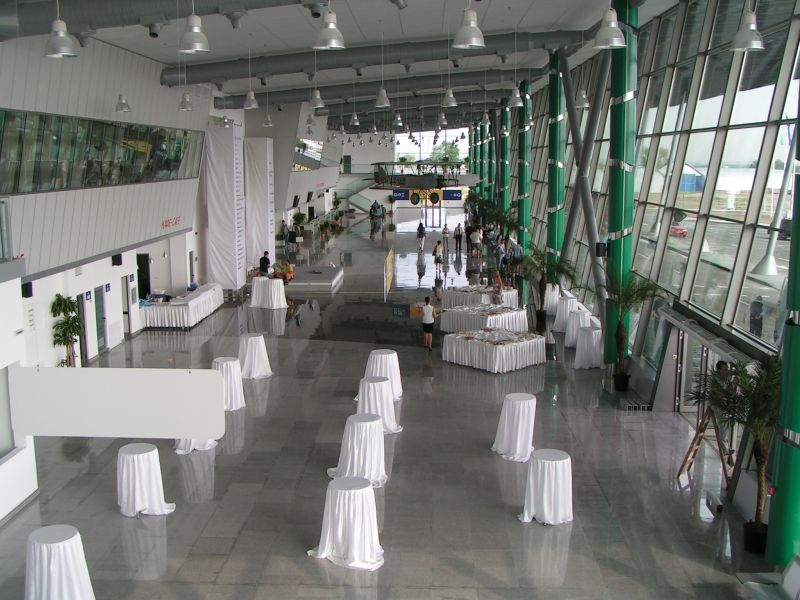
The new passenger terminal

Although the airport is operated by the state-owned Letishte Plovdiv EAD and the runway and the apron are also state-owned, the terminal is partly private. That made the renovation of the terminal very difficult. Today the terminal is 58.08% owned by Alfa Finance Holding (former owner of these shares was the Swiss firm TADO) and the rest of the shares belong to the state-owned "Mezhdunarodno letishte Plovdiv" EAD. The problems in agreement with the private owners of the terminal brought the decision from the state to build new terminal and to extend the apron. The renovation process started at the beginning of 2009; the apron extension for 6 additional aircraft stands was made by Glavbolgarstroy and the new terminal building by a local firm. The total cost are estimated to be EUR 20 million.

The new passenger terminal building was officially opened on 1 July 2009. With an area of 6,750 m^{2} (72,700 sq ft), it has 10 check-in desks and 3 gates, and is designed to handle up to 1,000 passengers per hour at peak times.

According to British consultants from Airport Strategy & Marketing, which were hired to investigate possibilities for developing new routes, there is big interest from low-cost carriers like Ryanair and Wizz Air. Despite that, Ryanair has ceased the flights on 2 routes (Milan and Frankfurt) in 2015 after two years of stable operation.

== Concession ==
The government have started the first concession procedure back in 2011, but there were no candidates for it. The second attempt for the concession was made in the spring of 2016 when the government have opened a tender for a 35 years concession of the airport, but the tender was shortly cancelled for non-compliance with European rules. In December 2016 the government opened the 3-rd tender for the concession. In the new procedure 3 companies have made the bid for the airport - Silk Road Plovdiv Airport, Consortium Plovdiv Airport and a tie-up between Hainan and Plovdiv Airport Invest. On 28 March 2018, Bulgarian Government awarded the consortium of HNA Group and Plovdiv Airport Invest a 35-year-long concession on Plovdiv airport in return for investments reaching €79 million, including a new cargo and passenger terminal. On 19 of July the consortium of HNA Group and Plovdiv Airport Invest have declared that it won't sign the concession contract which opens the road for the classified on the second place to take the concession.

== Other facilities ==
=== Krumovo Air Base ===
The 24th Helicopter Air Base of the Bulgarian Air Force, with Eurocopter AS 532, Mil Mi-24, Mil Mi-17 and Bell 206 units is located on the west side of the airport.

=== Aviation Museum Plovdiv ===
Next to the airbase is the only functional aviation museum in Bulgaria. Opened in 1991, the museum has a rich collection of modern, cold war airplanes and such from the Third Bulgarian Kingdom. Due to the low state budget, the collection is preserved mostly by donations. The museum is accessible by car on the way to the airport and is about 100m from Mavrudovo railway station. Working hours for visitors are 9:00–16:00.

== Airlines and destinations ==
The following airlines operate regular scheduled, charter, and seasonal charter flights at Plovdiv Airport:

Airlines	Destinations
Israir	Seasonal charter: Tel Aviv
Jet2.com	Seasonal charter: Belfast–International
Ryanair	London–Stansted, Milan–Malpensa; Seasonal: Birmingham, Malta (begins 29 March 2027), Manchester
Wizz Air	London–Luton

== Statistics ==
=== Traffic ===
Traffic at Plovdiv Airport
Year	Passengers	Change	Cargo (tonnes)	Change	Aircraft movements	Change
1998	52,702	Steady	1,084	Steady	1,463	Steady
1999	38,811	▼32.7%	402	▼62.9%	612	▼58.2%
2000	37,680	▼2.9%	682	▲49.8%	1,518	▲148.0%
2001	27,627	▼26.6%	1,135	▲66.4%	1,140	▼24.9%
2002	26,639	▼3.6%	818	▼27.9%	975	▼14.5%
2003	27,379	▲2.8%	1,256	▼99.8%	924	▼5.2%
2004	37,760	▲37.9%	2,138	▲70.2%	1,277	▲38.2%
2005	66,168	▲75.2%	2,276	▲6.4%	1,598	▲25.1%
2006	93,245	▲40.9%	2,126	▼6.6%	2,011	▲25.8%
2007	104,130	▲11.7%	1,867	▼12.1%	1,990	▼1.0%
2008	61,276	▼41.1%	666	▼64.3%	1,702	▼14.5%
2009	24,919	▲3.0%	472	▼29.1%	6,138	▲260.6%
2010	26,547	▲6.5%	369	▼21.8%	4,983	▼18.8%
2011	76,835	▲5.4%	380	▲2.9%	5,805	▲0.2%
2012	88,704	▲189.4%	255	▼33.0%	4,193	▼27.8%
2013	92,097	▲3.8%	182	▼28.6%	3,657	▼12.8%
2014	103,292	▲12.1%	554	▲204.4%	2,643	▼27.7%
2015	103,300	▲0.1%	821	▲48.2%	3,243	▲22.7%
2016	77,097	▼25.4%	2,755	▲235.6%	2,474	▼23.7%
2017	90,136	▲16.9%	628	▼77.2%	2,444	▼1.2%
2018	133,397	▲48.0%	521	▼17.0%	3,923	▲60.5%
2019	77,309	▼42.0%	573	▲10.0%	3,786	▼3.5%
2020	42,120	▼45.5%	459	▼19.9%	3,621	▼4.3%
2021	38,166	▼9.4%	112	▼75.6%	3,448	▼4.8%
2022	221,721	▲480.9%	16	▼85.7%	4,757	▲47.9%
2023	183,988	▼17.0%	26	▲62.5%	3,408	▼28.4%
2024	163,307	▼12.6%	68	▲261%	3,245	▼5%
2025	200,231	▲22.6%	77	▲13.2%	3,760	▲15.8%
Source: Directorate General "Civil Aviation Administration"

== See also ==
- List of airports in Bulgaria
- List of airlines of Bulgaria
- List of the busiest airports in Europe by passenger traffic
