= Lesnovo, Sofia Province =

Lesnovo Лесново
- Village
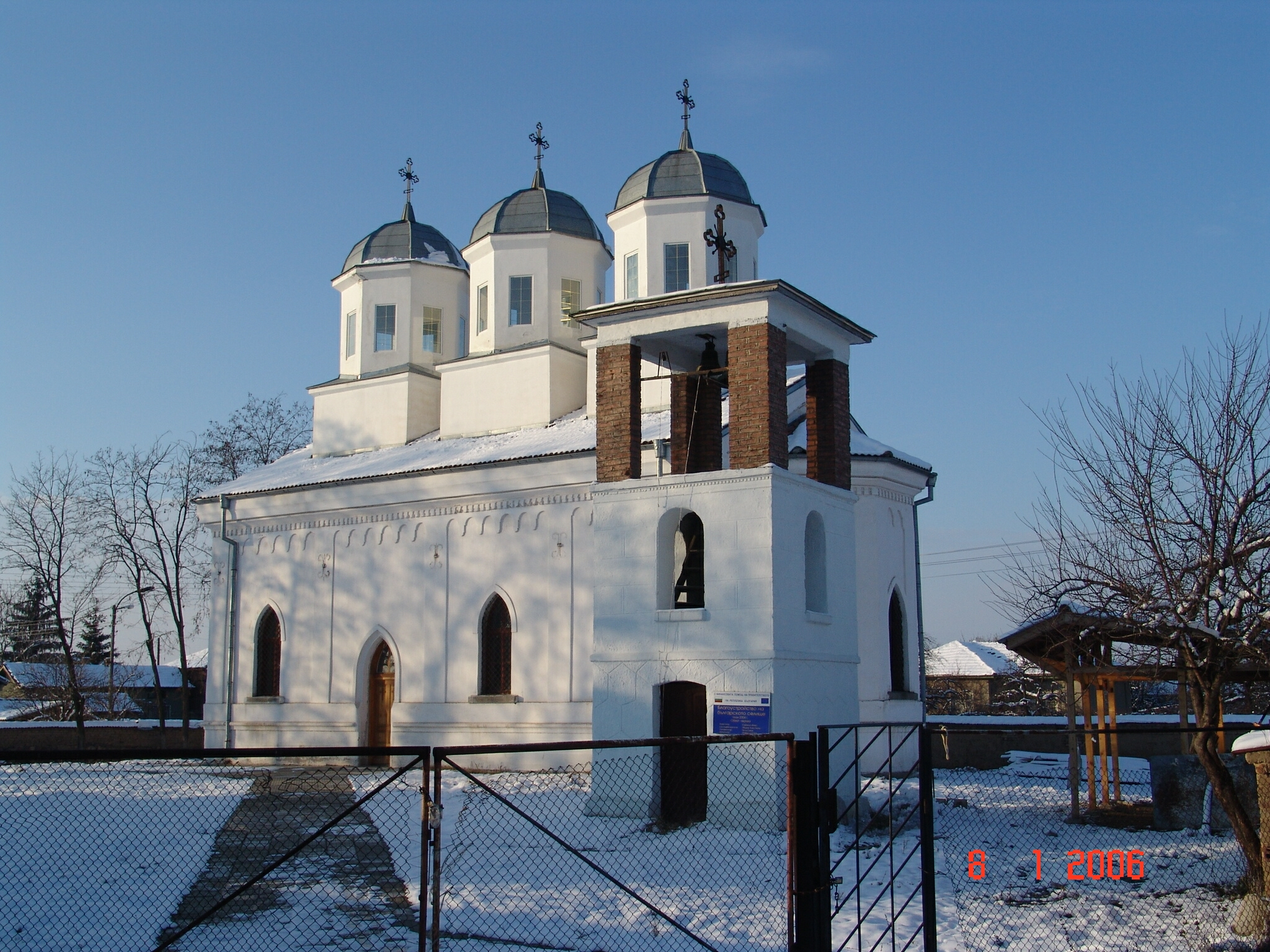
- Lesnovo's three-domed church

- Location in Bulgaria
- Coordinates: 42°38′36″N 23°38′26″E
- Country: Bulgaria
- Province: Sofia Province
- Municipality: Elin Pelin

Population (2024)
  - Total: 1,640
- Time zone: UTC+2 (EET)
  - Summer (DST): UTC+3 (EEST)

Lesnovo (Bulgarian: Лесново) is a village in Western Bulgaria, part of Elin Pelin Municipality, Sofia Province. As of December 2024, it has 1640 inhabitants.

== Geography ==
Lesnovo lies in the Eastern part of the Sofia Valley, between the Balkan Mountains to the North and Sredna Gora Mountains to the South-East. The "Lesnovska" River, a tributary to the Iskar river, flows to the North of the village.

The village is 3 kilometers South-East of the city of Elin Pelin, and about 20 kilometers east of Sofia.

== History ==
The village came into existence in the 16-17th centuries. During the village's time under ottoman rule, it had the name of "Ormanli", coming from the Turkish "orman", meaning "forest".

When the Bulgarian state was established in 1878, the village underwent a series of changes.

The first school in the village was established in 1879, hosted in the house of an affluent Turk, who relocated to Turkey after the village became part of the Principality of Bulgaria, a semi-autonomous vassal state of the Ottoman Empire.

The name was also altered to a Bulgarian variation of the previous name - "Ormanlia". This remained the name of the village for 56 years until 1934, when it was renamed to the current "Lesnovo", derived from "Les", which also means forest, as well as the suffix '-ovo', following Bulgarian locale naming customs.

== Notable features ==
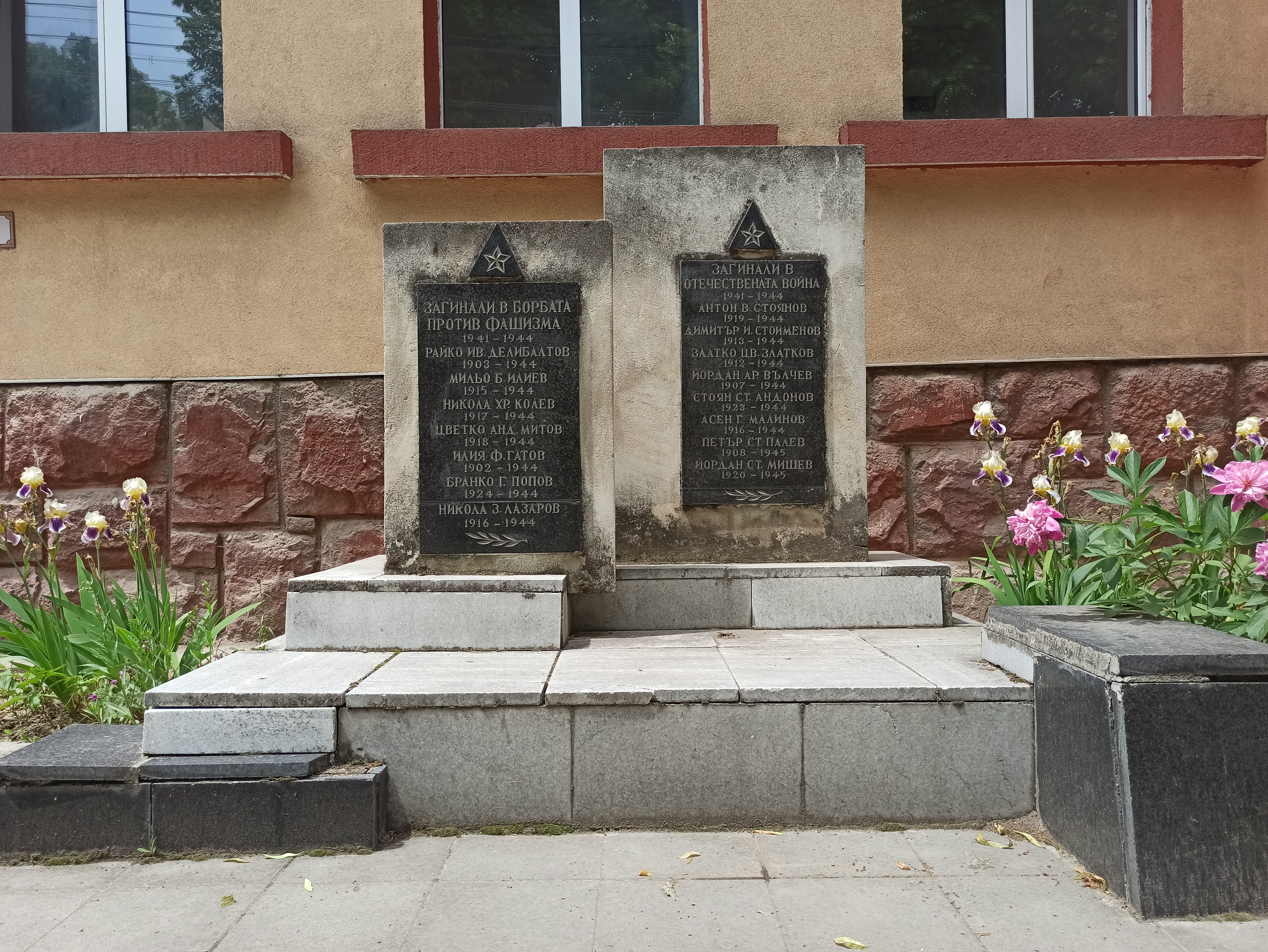
Plaques commemorating locals who resisted the Axis powers during WWII.

Lesnovo has an Eastern Orthodox church 'St. Archangel Michael', featuring three domes and pointed arches, both of which are uncommon designs in Bulgarian orthodox church architecture. The village also has a small airstrip - Lesnovo Airfield, used until 1989 as an agrocultural airport, eventually sold in 2001 and converted into a private airstrip.

Lesnovo has a community centre ('chitalishte') called 'Immortality' decorated with a monument to the local Bulgarian villagers who lost their lives fighting the Nazis during the Second world war. There is also, a commemorative plaque on the water fountain in the centre of the village which reads: 'To all those who fell in the struggle against Fascism and Capitalism'.

Lesnovo Hill in Antarctica is named after the village.

== Gallery ==
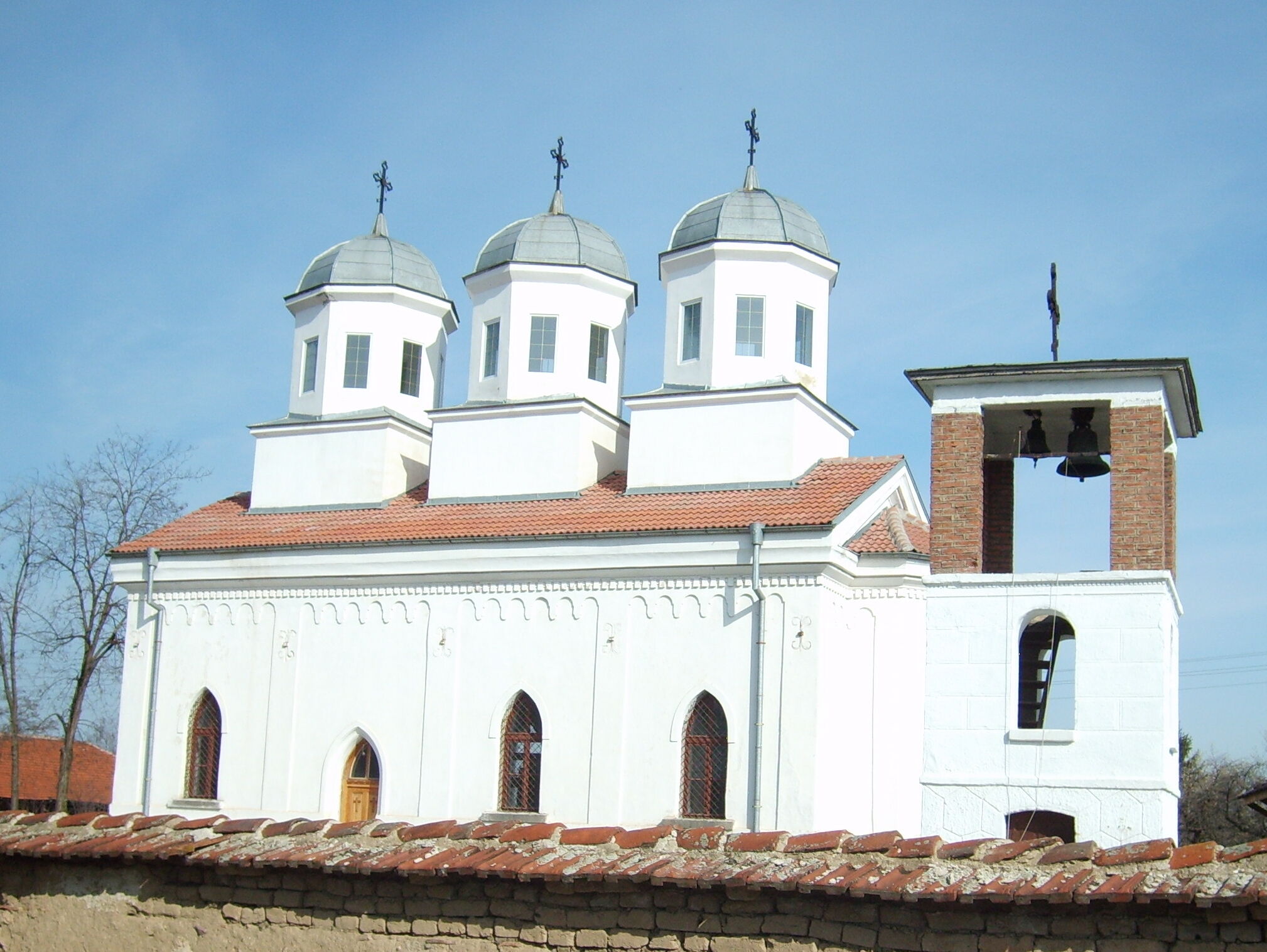
Church

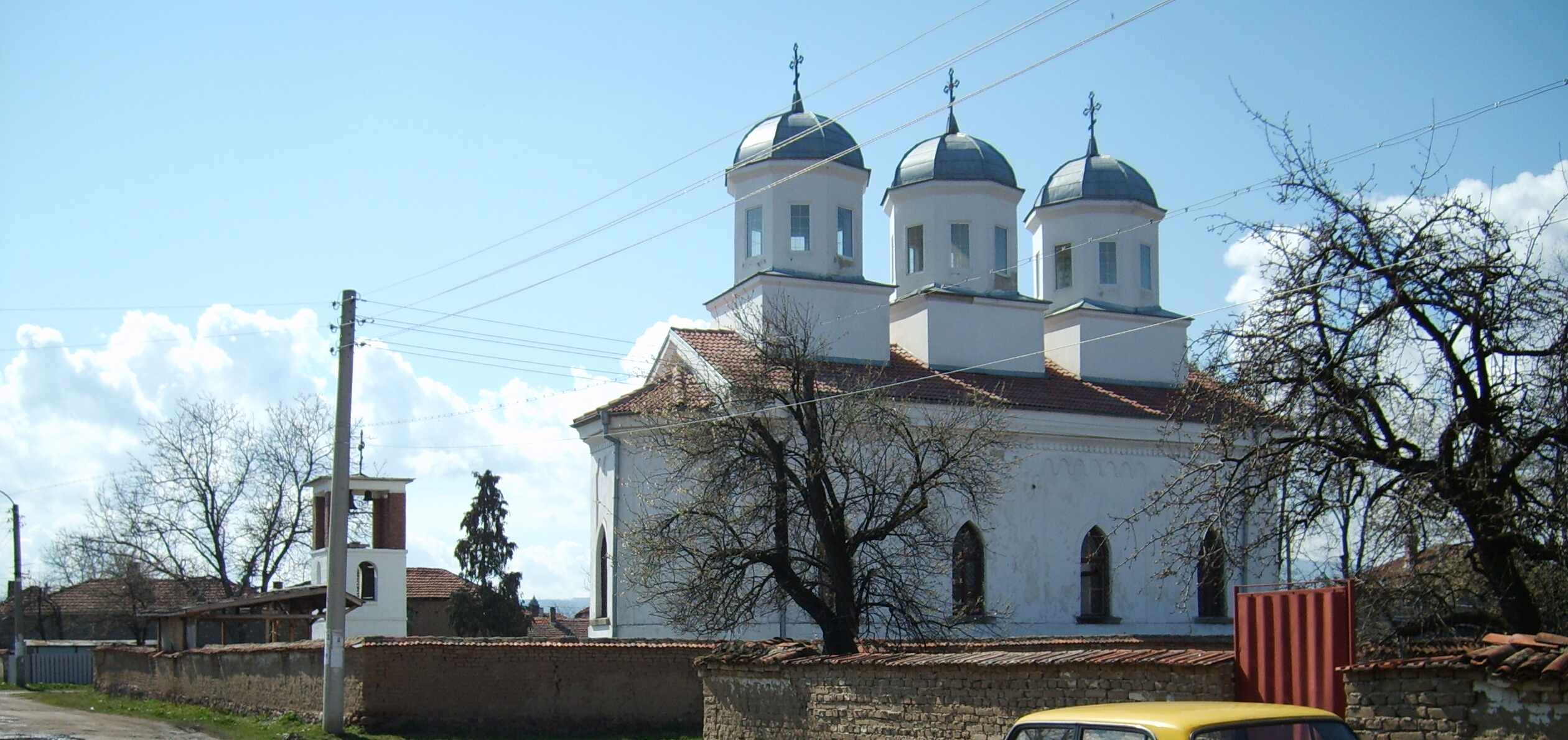
Church

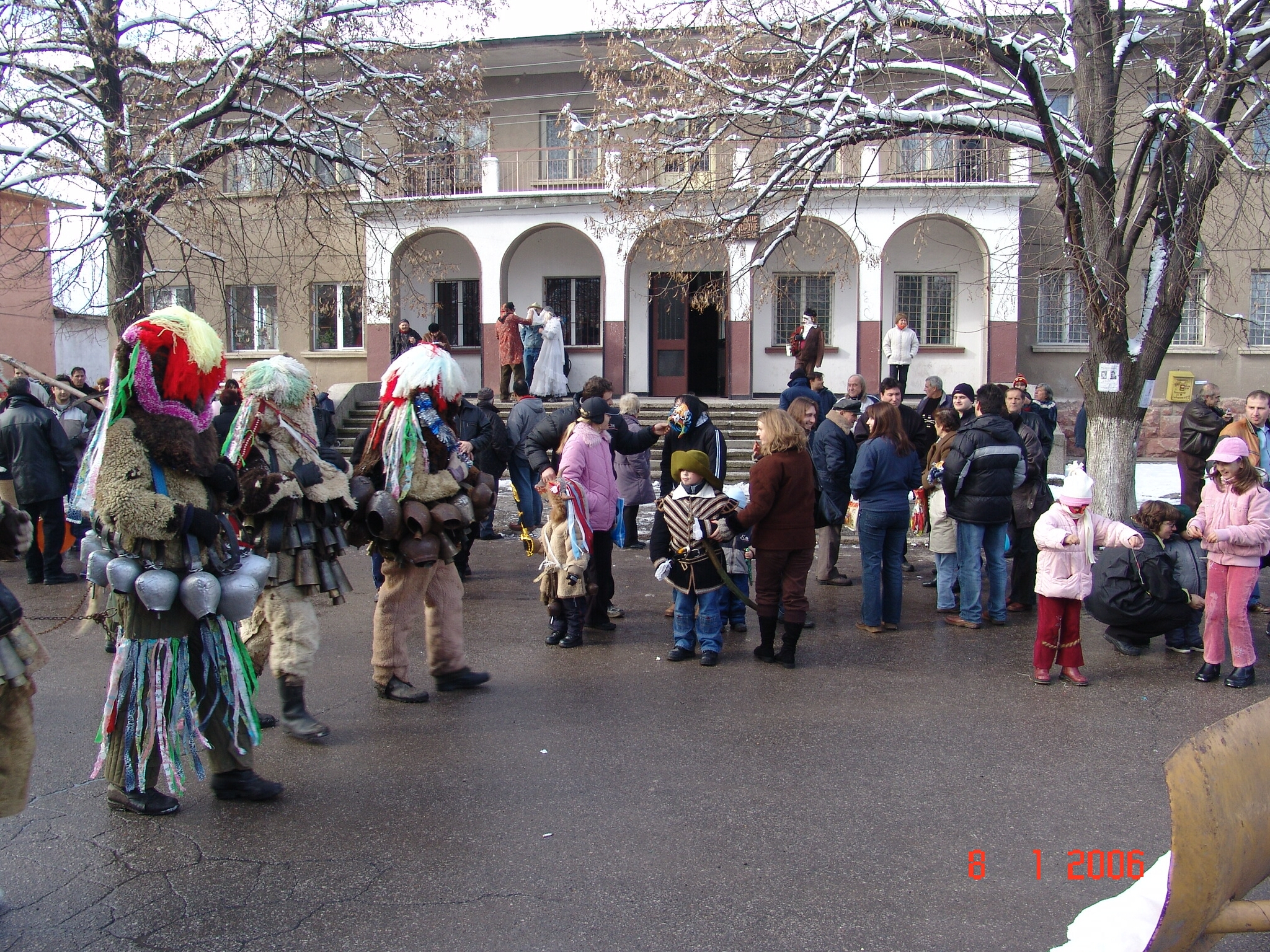
Kukeri

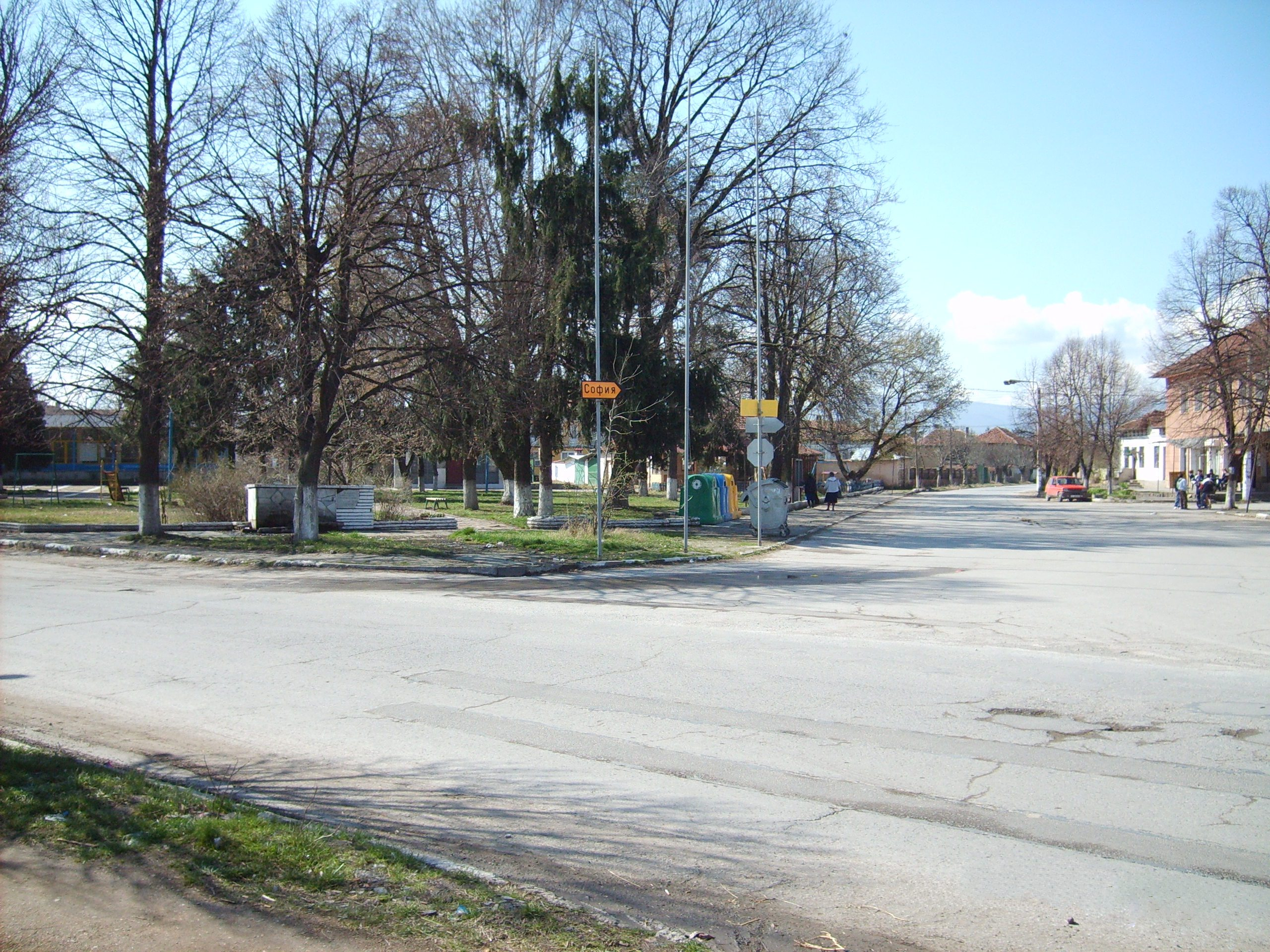
Village centre

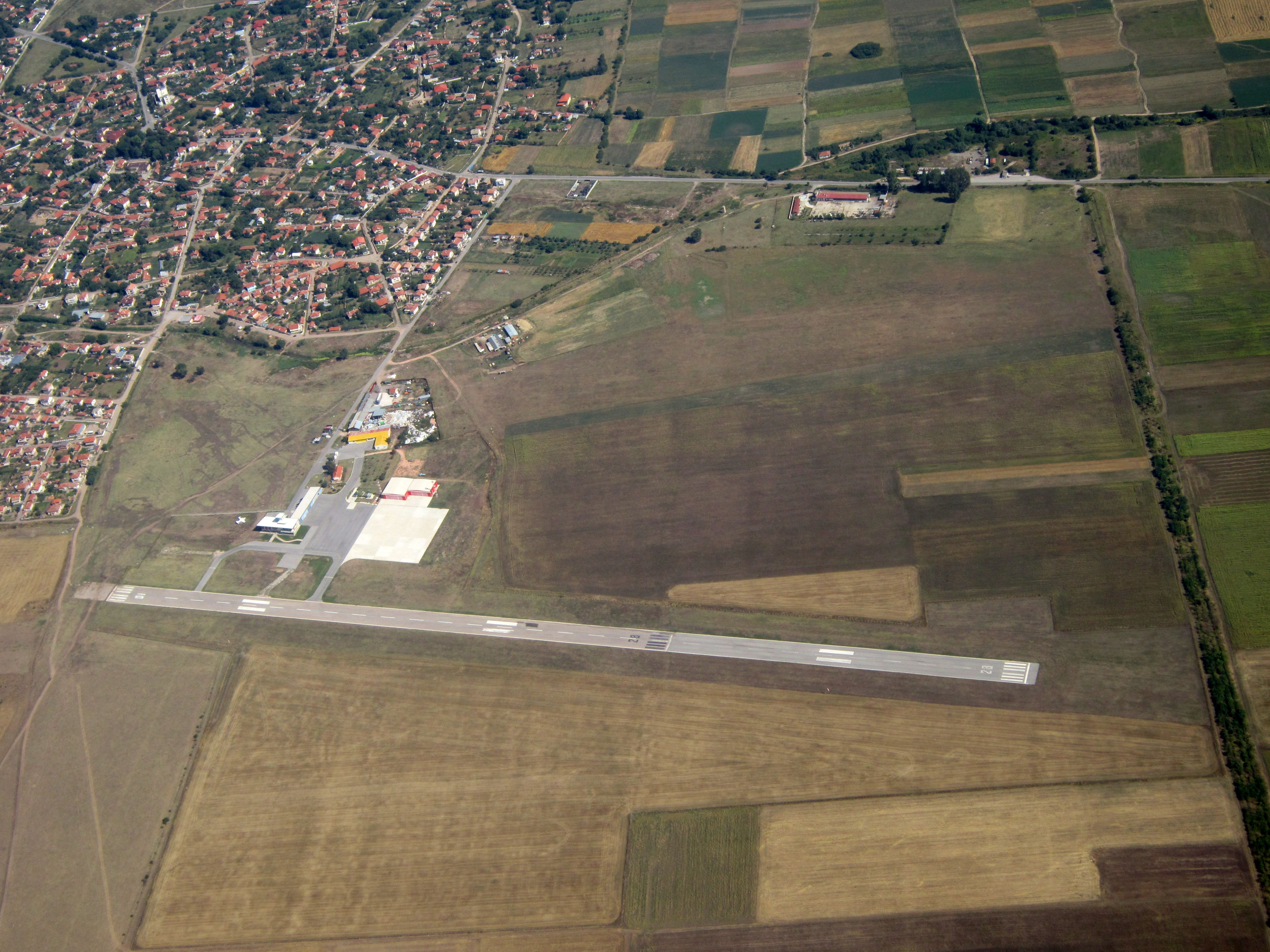
Airfield
