= Chernevo, Kovrovsky District, Vladimir Oblast =

Chernevo Чернево
- Village
- Location within Vladimir Oblast Location within Russia
- Coordinates: 56°18′N 41°16′E
- Country: Russia
- Region: Vladimir Oblast
- District: Kovrovsky District
- Time zone: UTC+3:00

Chernevo (Russian: Чернево) is a rural locality (a village) in Novoselskoye Rural Settlement, Kovrovsky District, Vladimir Oblast, Russia. The population was 4 as of 2010.

== Geography ==
Chernevo is located 7 km southwest of Kovrov (the district's administrative centre) by road. Pervomaysky is the nearest rural locality.
