= Bohot =

Bohot Бохот
- Village
- Location within Bulgaria
- Coordinates: 43.317°N 24.700°E
- Country: Bulgaria
- Province: Pleven
- Municipality: Pleven

Government
  - Mayor: Boika Pusheva (GERB)

Area
  - Total: 46,489 km^{2} (17,950 sq mi)
- Elevation: 321 m (1,053 ft)

Population (2015)
  - Total: 811
- Postal code: 5891
- Area code: 063575

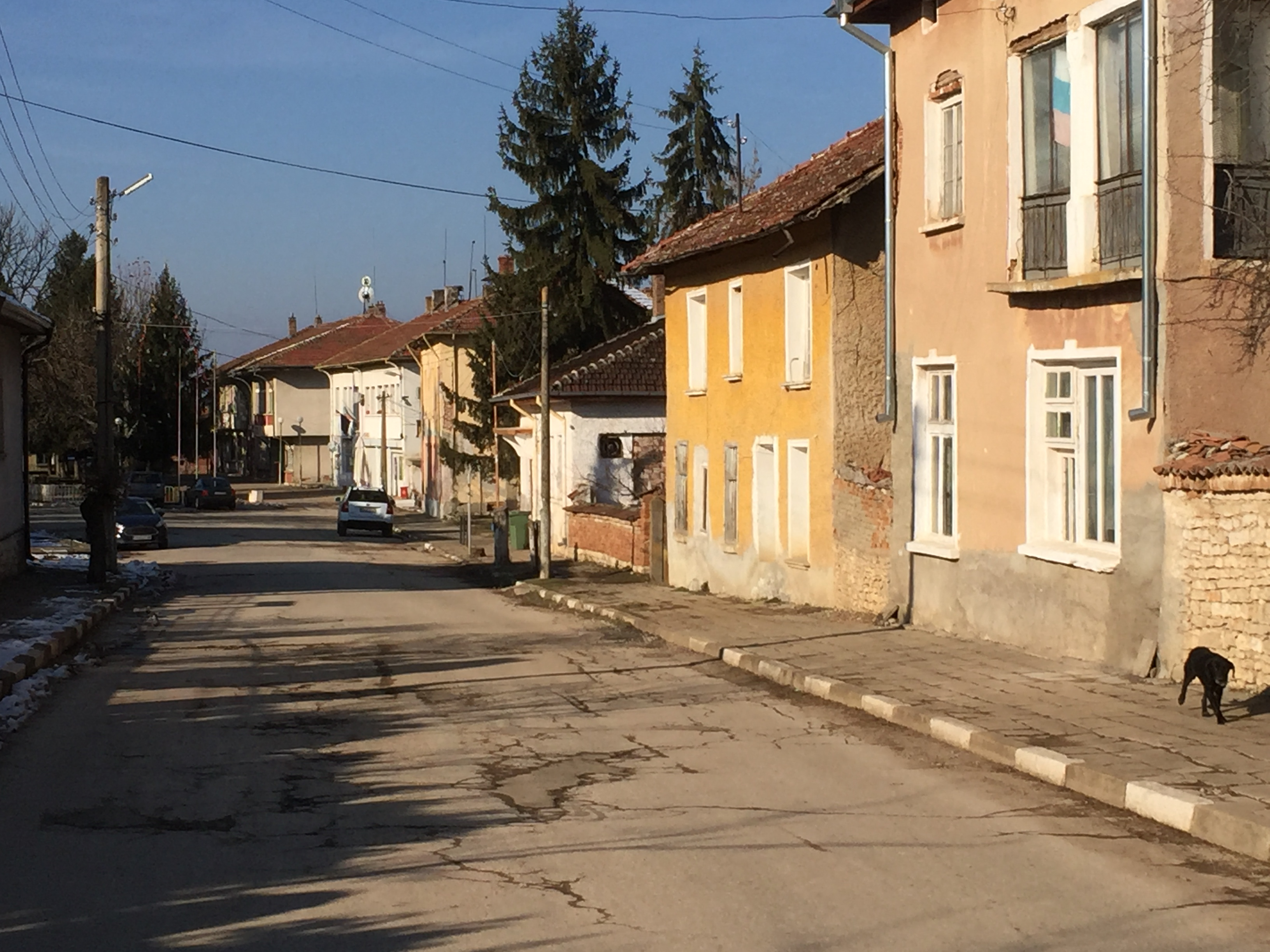
Bohot Main Street, on a sunny day in January 2020

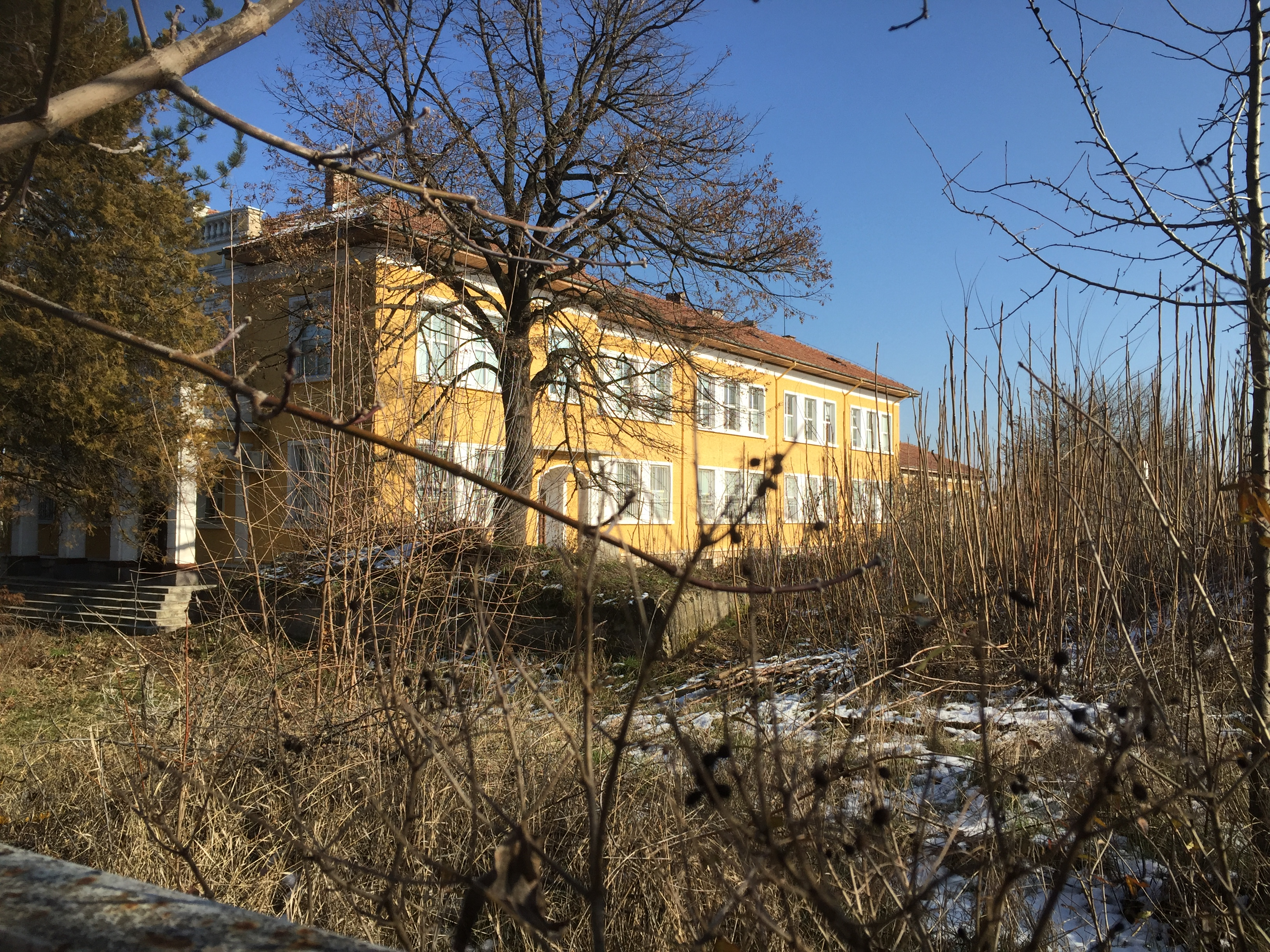
School of the village of Bohot, Pleven region, Bulgaria, seen from the backyard, in January 2020

Bohot (Bulgarian: Бохот [ˈbɔxot]) is a village in northern Bulgaria. It is located in the municipality of Pleven in the Pleven Province.

Bohot Nunatak in Antarctica is named after the village.
