= Mount Barden =

Mountain in Ellsworth Land, Antarctica

Location of Sentinel Range in Western Antarctica.

Northern Sentinel Range map.

Mount Barden (77°51′S 86°13′W) is a mountain, 2,910 m, standing 2.5 nautical miles (4.6 km) northwest of Mount Sharp in the north portion of the Sentinel Range. It surmounts Zhenda Glacier to the east. The mountain was named by the Advisory Committee on Antarctic Names (US-ACAN) for Virgil W. Barden, an ionospheric physicist and member of the 1957 wintering party at Byrd Station.

== See also ==
- Mountains in Antarctica
