= Robinson Pass =

Coordinates: 77°56′00″S 85°37′10″W

Location of Sentinel Range in Western Antarctica.

Map of northern Sentinel Range.

Robinson Pass (Bulgarian: проход Робинсън, Prohod Robinson), in Antarctica, is the ice-covered saddle of elevation 1,700 m (5,600 ft) between Sostra Heights on the east and the side ridge on the west that trends east-northeast from Mount Dalrymple on the main crest of northern Sentinel Range in Ellsworth Mountains, Antarctica. It is part of the glacial divide between Sabazios Glacier to the north and Embree Glacier to the south.

The pass is named after the Australian James Kerguelen Robinson (1859–1914), the first human born south of the Antarctic Convergence – on board the sealing ship Offley in Gulf of Morbihan (Royal Sound then), Kerguelen Island on 11 March 1859.

== Location ==
Robinson Pass is 9.15 km (5.69 mi) east-northeast of Mount Dalrymple, 3.35 km (2.08 mi) southwest of Mount Malone in Sostra Heights, and 9 km (5.6 mi) north of Mount Schmid in Bangey Heights.

== Maps ==
- Newcomer Glacier. Scale 1:250 000 topographic map. Reston, Virginia: US Geological Survey, 1961.
- Antarctic Digital Database (ADD). Scale 1:250000 topographic map of Antarctica. Scientific Committee on Antarctic Research (SCAR). Since 1993, regularly updated.
