= Kalimantsi, Varna Province =

Kalimantsi Калиманци
- Village
- Location in Bulgaria
- Coordinates: 43.278619°N 27.723815°E
- Country: Bulgaria
- Province: Varna Province
- Municipality: Karnobat Municipality

Population (2017)
  - Total: ▲328
- Time zone: UTC+2 (EET)
  - Summer (DST): UTC+3 (EEST)

Kalimantsi (Bulgarian: Калиманци) is a village in Suvorovo Municipality, Varna Province, Bulgaria. Until 1934 the name of the village was Gevrekler (Bulgarian: Гевреклер).

== Population ==
As of December 2017, the village of Kalimantsi has 328 inhabitants. Nearly all of them are ethnic Bulgarians (96%) who belong to the Bulgarian Orthodox Church. The largest age bracket is the 60 to 69 years old group, with 73 people. Elderly constitute 33% of the population.
