= Sostra Heights =

Location of Sentinel Range in Western Antarctica

Map of northern Sentinel Range

Sostra Heights (Bulgarian: Состренски възвишения, ‘Sostrenski Vazvisheniya’ \'so-stren-ski v&-zvi-'she-ni-ya\) are the heights rising to 2,352 metres (7,717 ft) at Mount Malone on the east side of northern Sentinel Range in Ellsworth Mountains, Antarctica. They extend 22 kilometres (14 mi) in northwest–southeast direction and 16.5 kilometres (10.3 mi) in northeast–southwest direction. The heights are bounded by Embree Glacier to the south, Sabazios Glacier to the west, Newcomer Glacier to the north and Rutford Ice Stream to the east, and separated by Robinson Pass to the southwest from the side ridge that trends 9.15 kilometres (5.69 mi) east-northeastwards from Mount Dalrymple on the main crest of Sentinel Range. Their interior is drained by Anchialus Glacier and Vit Ice Piedmont.

The heights are named after the ancient Roman fortress of Sostra in northern Bulgaria.

== Location ==
Sostra Heights are centred at 77°53′00″S 85°28′00″W. US mapping in 1961.

== Features ==
Geographical features include:

- Anchialus Glacier
- Blenika Peak
- Bracken Peak
- Embree Glacier
- Mount Lanning
- Mount Malone
- Mount McKeown
- Newcomer Glacier
- Robinson Pass
- Sabazios Glacier
- Skaklya Glacier
- Vit Ice Piedmont
- Zhenda Glacier

== Maps ==
- Newcomer Glacier. Scale 1:250 000 topographic map. Reston, Virginia: US Geological Survey, 1961.
- Antarctic Digital Database (ADD). Scale 1:250000 topographic map of Antarctica. Scientific Committee on Antarctic Research (SCAR). Since 1993, regularly upgraded and updated.
