= Mount Warren (Antarctica) =

Mountain in the antarctic

Location of Sentinel Range in Western Antarctica.

Northern Sentinel Range map.

Mount Warren (77°43′S 85°57′W) is a mountain rising to 2,340 metres (7,680 ft) in Gromshin Heights, just north of the turn in Newcomer Glacier on the east side of northern Sentinel Range in Ellsworth Mountains, Antarctica. It surmounts Newcomer Glacier to the west and south, and Vicha Glacier to the northeast.

The peak was named by the Advisory Committee on Antarctic Names (US-ACAN) for Aviation Master Sergeant Cecil O. Warren, U.S. Marine Corps (USMC), navigator on U.S. Navy (USN) Squadron VX-6 photographic flights over the range on Dec. 14–15, 1959.

== Maps ==
- Newcomer Glacier. Scale 1:250 000 topographic map. Reston, Virginia: US Geological Survey, 1961.
- Antarctic Digital Database (ADD). Scale 1:250000 topographic map of Antarctica. Scientific Committee on Antarctic Research (SCAR). Since 1993, regularly updated.
