= Mount Malone =

Mountain in Ellsworth Land, Antarctica

Location of Sentinel Range in Western Antarctica.

Map of northern Sentinel Range.

Mount Malone (77°52′S 85°36′W) is a big mountain, 2,460 metres (8,070 ft) high, located 8 nautical miles (15 km) east of Mount Barden in the northern part of the Sentinel Range of the Ellsworth Mountains in Antarctica. It is the summit of Sostra Heights, surmounting Sabazios Glacier to the west and Anchialus Glacier to the northeast.

The mountain was first mapped by the United States Geological Survey from surveys and U.S. Navy air photos in the period 1957 to 1959. The mountain was named by the Advisory Committee on Antarctic Names for Captain Wallace R. Malone, United States Air Force, who participated in the establishment of South Pole Station in the 1956–57 season.

== See also ==
- Mountains in Antarctica
