= Izgrev, Varna Province =

Coordinates: 43°18′N 027°42′E

Izgrev (Bulgarian: Изгрев) is a village (село) in northeastern Bulgaria, located in the Suvorovo Municipality (Община Суворово) of the Varna Province (Област Варна).

== Population ==
As of December 2017, the village of Izgrev has 274 inhabitants. Its population is increasing after declining for decades. The village is exclusively inhabited by ethnic Bulgarians (100%), who are Bulgarian Orthodox by faith.

== Honours ==
Izgrev Passage in Antarctica is named after the village.
