= Mount Ulmer =

Mountain in Ellsworth Land, Antarctica

Highest point
- Elevation: 2,776 m (9,108 ft)
- Prominence: 1,264 m (4,147 ft)
- Listing: Ribu

Location of Sentinel Range in Western Antarctica.

Northern Sentinel Range map.

Mount Ulmer (77°35′S 86°09′W) is a prominent peak situated 2 miles north of Mount Washburn in Gromshin Heights on the east side of northern Sentinel Range in Ellsworth Mountains, Antarctica. It surmounts the head of Vicha Glacier to the east and Newcomer Glacier to the west.

The mountain was discovered by Lincoln Ellsworth in his trans-Antarctic flight on November 23, 1935, who called it "Mount Mary Louise Ulmer", after his wife. The peak was reidentified by comparing Ellsworth's photograph with those taken in 1959 by the U.S. Navy.

The peak of the mountain rises to a total of 3,800 meters.

== Maps ==
- Newcomer Glacier. Scale 1:250 000 topographic map. Reston, Virginia: US Geological Survey, 1961.
- Antarctic Digital Database (ADD). Scale 1:250000 topographic map of Antarctica. Scientific Committee on Antarctic Research (SCAR). Since 1993, regularly updated.
