= Newcomer Glacier =

Glacier in Antarctica

- Location of Sentinel Range in Western Antarctica

- Location within Antarctica
- Location: Ellsworth Land
- Coordinates: 77°47′00″S 85°27′00″W
- Length: 20 nautical miles (37 km; 23 mi)
- Thickness: unknown
- Status: unknown

Northern Sentinel Range map.

Newcomer Glacier (77°47′S 85°27′W) is a glacier 20 nautical miles (37 km; 23 mi) long transecting the north part of the Sentinel Range, flowing from the vicinity of Allen Peak southeast between Gromshin Heights and the main ridge of range, and then east between Gromshin Heights and Sostra Heights to where it leaves the Sentinel Range north of Bracken Peak and south of Foros Spur. Named by the Advisory Committee on Antarctic Names (US-ACAN) for Commander Loyd E. Newcomer of U.S. Navy Squadron VX-6, pilot on photographic flights over the range on 14–15 December 1959.

== Tributary glaciers ==
- Anchialus Glacier
- Sabazios Glacier
- Vidul Glacier

== See also ==
- List of glaciers in the Antarctic
- Glaciology

== Maps ==
- Newcomer Glacier. Scale 1:250 000 topographic map. Reston, Virginia: US Geological Survey, 1961.
- Antarctic Digital Database (ADD). Scale 1:250000 topographic map of Antarctica. Scientific Committee on Antarctic Research (SCAR). Since 1993, regularly updated.
