= 3i =

British investment management company

3i Group plc
- Formerly: Finance for Industry Public Limited Company (1973–1983); Investors in Industry Group plc (1983–1988)
- Type: Public
- Traded as: LSE: III; FTSE 100 Component
- ISIN: GB00B1YW4409
- Industry: Corporate finance
- Founded: 1945; 81 years ago
- Founder: Bank of England and a syndicate of British banks
- Headquarters: London, England, UK
- Key people: David Hutchison (chairman); Simon Borrows (CEO)
- Services: Private equity; Infrastructure investment
- Operating income: ▲£5,275 million (2026)
- Net income: ▲£5,294 million (2026)
- AUM: £36.8 billion (2026)
- Number of employees: c.250 (2024)
- Website: www.3i.com

3i Group plc is a British multinational private equity and infrastructure investment company based in London, England. 3i is listed on the London Stock Exchange and is a constituent of the FTSE 100 Index.

== History ==
The company was formed in 1945, as the Industrial and Commercial Finance Corporation (ICFC), by the Bank of England and the major British banks to provide long-term investment funding for small and medium-sized enterprises. Its foundation was inspired by the Macmillan Committee, and resulted from the recognition in the 1930s, given new impetus in the postwar era, that smaller businesses faced a gap in available corporate finance due to banks being unwilling to provide long-term capital and the companies being too small to raise capital from the public markets.

During the 1950s and 1960s, and particularly after 1959 when the shareholder banks allowed it to raise external funds, ICFC expanded significantly. In 1973 ICFC acquired Finance Corporation for Industry, a sister company also formed in 1945 which focused on finance for large companies, and was renamed Finance for Industry (FFI). In the 1980s, FFI became a leading provider of finance for management buyouts, and expanded internationally. In 1983 the company was renamed Investors in Industry, commonly known as 3i.

3i Group was created in 1987 when the banks sold off their stakes to form a public limited company. In 1994 the company was floated on the London Stock Exchange with a market capitalisation of £1.5 billion.

== Operations ==
3i invests in mid-market buyouts, growth capital (minority) and infrastructure. Sectors invested in are business and financial services, consumer, industrials and energy, and healthcare.

=== Current investments ===
- Action: in June 2011 3i bought a majority stake in this Dutch discount retailer.
- Audley Travel: In December 2015 3i invested in Audley Travel, the lead operator in the tailor-made travel market.
- BoConcept: Furniture company purchased in 2016
- ESP Utilities Group: In June 2017, 3i invested in ESP Utilities Group, one of UK’s largest and longest established Independent Gas Transporters (IGT) and Independent Distribution Network Operators (IDNO).
- Formel D: In 2017, 3i invested €155 million in Formel D, a German car parts company, while CITIC invested €72 million.
- Belfast City Airport
- Global Cloud Xchange
- Infinis
- Q Holding Co: 3i are due to purchase the company's three main operating businesses, Qure Medical, QSR and Quadra Tooling and Automation.
- Regional Rail
- Scandlines: 3i purchased a 100% stake in November 2013, reduced to 35% in 2018
- Smarte Carte, purchased 2017
- TCR International

=== Former investments ===
- ACR Capital Reinsurance, purchased 2006, sold 2020
- Agent Provocateur (80%), purchased 2007, sold 2017
- Boxer TV Access (30%) purchased 2005, sold 2008
- Chiltern Railways (26%) purchased 1996, sold 1999
- DNA (13%) purchased 2007, sold 2009
- Dockwise, purchased 2006, sold 2009
- ERM (57%) purchased 2001, sold 2005
- Eversholt Rail Group, purchased 2010, sold 2015
- Foster + Partners, purchased 2007, sold 2014
- Freightliner (38%), purchased 1996, sold 2008
- Giraffe World Kitchen (40%), purchased 2006, sold 2013
- Go, purchased 2001, sold 2002
- Great Western Holdings (25%) purchased 1996, sold 1998
- HSS Hire, purchased 2003, sold 2007
- Little Sheep Group (11%), purchased 2006, sold 2009
- Mayborn Group, purchased 2006, sold 2016
- MWM, purchased 2007, sold 2010
- NSL, purchased 2005, sold 2010
- Petrofac (16%), purchased 2002, sold 2005
- Salamander Energy (15%), purchased 2005, sold 2006
- SLR Consulting (34%), purchased 2004, sold 2008
- Target Express (70%), purchased 2000, sold 2006
- TelecityGroup (45%) purchased 1998, sold 2010
- Titan Airways, sold 2013
- Tramlink (20%), purchased 1996, sold 2008
- Travellers Fare purchased 1989, sold 1992
- VNU Business Media, purchased 2006, sold 2012
- Weener Plastic Packaging: purchased 2015, sold 2024
