= KLM =

National airline of the Netherlands

KLM Royal Dutch Airlines

- KLM Airbus A350-900
IATA	ICAO	Call sign
KL	KLM	KLM
- Founded: 7 October 1919; 107 years ago
- Hubs: Amsterdam Airport Schiphol
- Frequent-flyer program: Flying Blue
- Alliance: SkyTeam
- Subsidiaries: KLM Cityhopper; KLM Asia; Martinair; Transavia; Cygnific
- Fleet size: 126
- Destinations: 171
- Parent company: Air France–KLM
- Headquarters: Amstelveen, Netherlands
- Key people: Benjamin Smith (CEO, Air France-KLM) Marjan Rintel (president & CEO, KLM)
- Founder: Albert Plesman
- Revenue: €13.2 billion (2025)
- Net income: €416 million (2025)
- Employees: 36,071 (2024)
- Website: klm.com

KLM Royal Dutch Airlines, or simply KLM (an abbreviation for their official name Koninklijke Luchtvaart Maatschappij N.V. [ˈkoːnɪŋkləkə ˈlʏxtfaːrt ˌmaːtsxɑˈpɛi ˌɛnˈveː], lit. 'Royal Aviation Company'), is the flag carrier of the Netherlands. KLM's headquarters are located in Amstelveen, with its hub at nearby Amsterdam Airport Schiphol. It is a subsidiary of the Air France–KLM group and a member of the SkyTeam airline alliance. Founded in 1919, KLM is the oldest operating airline still using its original name, having gone through significant changes in its ownership and legal structure over its history, including a period of majority government ownership. The company had a fleet of 110 aircraft (excluding subsidiaries) and 35,488 employees as of 2021. KLM operates scheduled passenger and cargo services to 171 destinations.

Historically, KLM established some of the earliest scheduled intercontinental flights, including interwar routes to the Dutch East Indies (now Indonesia). In 2004, the airline merged with Air France to form the Air France–KLM holding company, though both carriers continue to operate under their separate brand identities. The airline's mainline network is supported by several subsidiaries. Regional European feeder routes are operated by KLM Cityhopper, while low-cost services are managed by Transavia. Freight operations are handled by KLM Cargo and its subsidiary Martinair.

== History ==
=== Early years ===
In 1919, young aviator lieutenant Albert Plesman sponsored the ELTA aviation exhibition in Amsterdam. Attendance at the exhibition was over half a million, and after it closed, several Dutch commercial interests intended to establish a Dutch airline, which Plesman was nominated to head. In September 1919, Queen Wilhelmina awarded the yet-to-be-founded KLM its "Royal" ("Koninklijke") predicate. On 7 October 1919, eight Dutch businessmen, including Frits Fentener van Vlissingen, founded KLM as one of the first commercial airline companies. Plesman became its first administrator and director.

The first KLM flight took place on 17 May 1920. KNLM's first pilot, Jerry Shaw, flew from Croydon Airport, London, to Amsterdam. The flight was flown using a leased Aircraft Transport and Travel de Havilland DH-16, registration G-EALU, which was carrying two British journalists and some newspapers. In 1920, KLM carried 440 passengers and 22 tons of freight. In April 1921, after a winter hiatus, KLM resumed its services using Fokker F.II and Fokker F.III aircraft. In 1921, KLM started scheduled services.

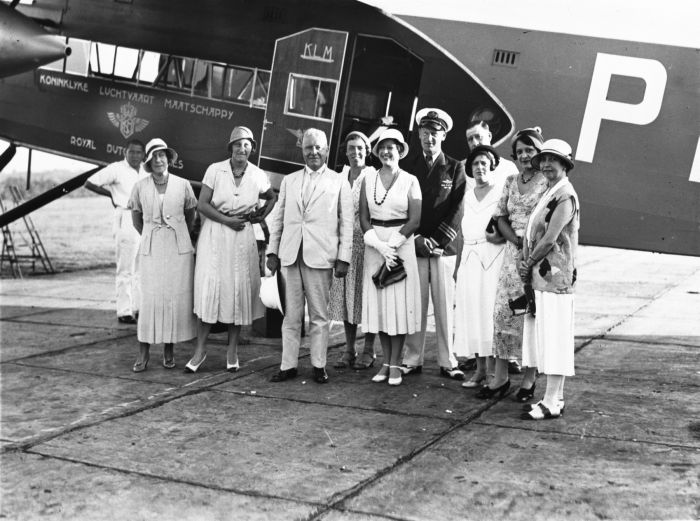
KLM Fokker F-XVIII departing from the Dutch East Indies, 1932

KLM's first experimental intercontinental flight took off on 1 October 1924. The final destination was Batavia, Dutch East Indies on Java, now Jakarta, Indonesia, into what would become Halim Perdanakusuma International Airport. The flight used a Fokker F.VII with registration H-NACC and was piloted by Jan Thomassen à Thuessink van der Hoop. In 1927, Baltimore millionaire Van Lear Black, who had heard about the 1924 flight, chartered H-NADP to do the same flight, which departed 15 June and went successfully (16 days), and flew back to much rejoicing. This inspired KLM to make a second test flight, which left on 1 October, returning successfully with much experience gained. In September 1929, regular scheduled services between Amsterdam and Batavia commenced. Until the outbreak of the Second World War in 1939, this was the world's longest-distance scheduled service by airplane. By 1926, it was offering flights to Amsterdam, Rotterdam, Brussels, Paris, London, Bremen, Copenhagen, and Malmö, using primarily Fokker F.II and Fokker F.III aircraft.

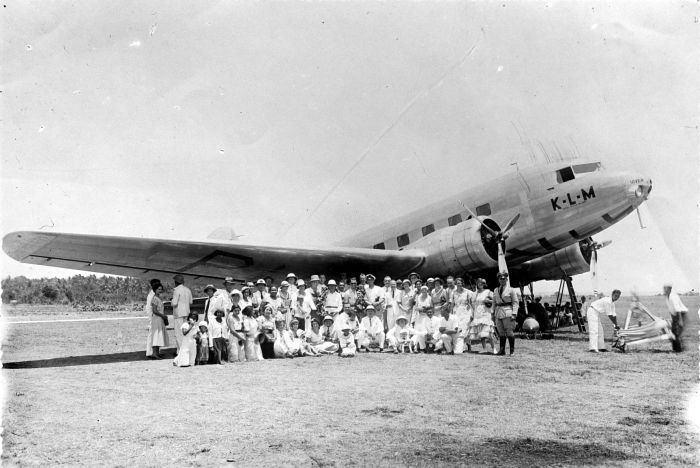
KLM Douglas DC-2 aircraft Uiver in transit at Rambang airfield on the east coast of Lombok island following the aircraft being placed second in the MacRobertson Air Race from RAF Mildenhall, England, to Melbourne in 1934

In 1930, KLM carried 15,143 passengers. The Douglas DC-2 was introduced on the Batavia service in 1934. The first experimental transatlantic KLM flight was between Amsterdam and Curaçao in December 1934 using the Fokker F.XVIII "Snip".

In July 1935, KLM had three major international passenger flight crashes in one week. The "Kwikstaart" crashed in Amsterdam on 14 July, the "Maraboe" in Bushir on 17 July, and the “Gaai” in San Giacomo on 20 July. The week of 14 to 20 July 1935 came to be known as a "black week" for KLM. In these three crashes, KLM lost three airplanes as well as crew in two of them. Together with an earlier crash in April of the "Leeuwerik", KLM had lost around 15% of its pilots in 1935. As a result, there was a shortage of crew members and airplanes, and the Amsterdam—Milan flight service was taken over by Deutsche Lufthansa.

The first of the airline's Douglas DC-3 aircraft were delivered by ship, on the Holland America Line ocean liner Statendam on 11 September 1936; these replaced the DC-2s on the service via Batavia to Sydney. KLM was the first airline to serve Manchester's new Ringway airport, starting in June 1938. KLM was the only civilian airline to receive the Douglas DC-5; the airline used two of them in the West Indies and sold two to the East Indies government, and is thus the only airline to have operated all Douglas 'DC' models other than the DC-1.

==== Second World War ====
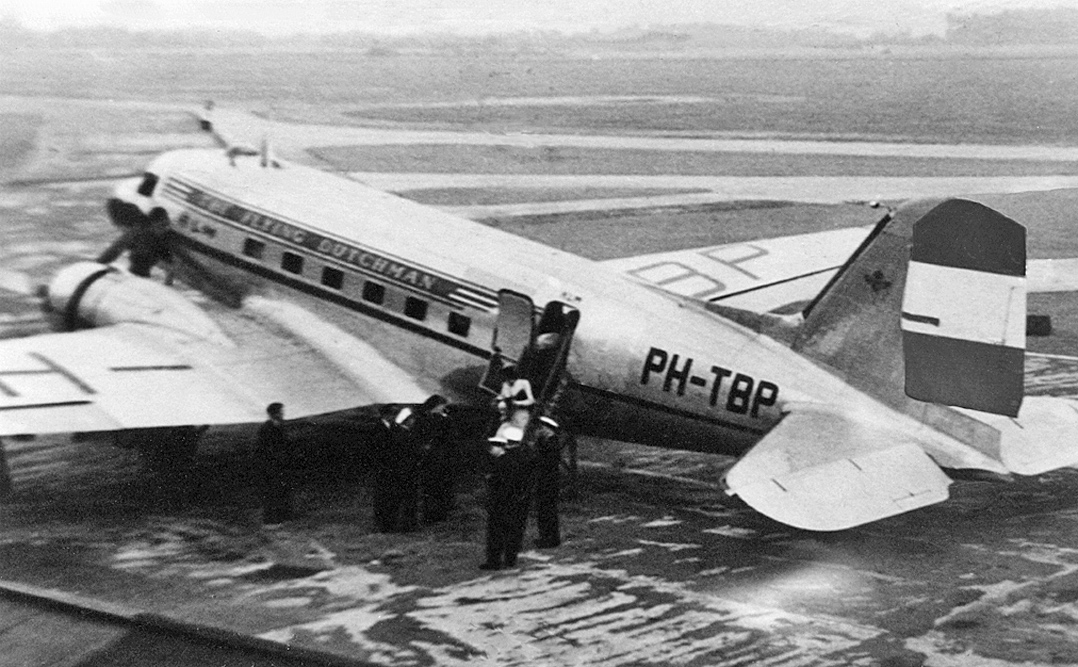
KLM Douglas DC-3 at Manchester Airport in 1947

The outbreak of the Second World War in September 1939 restricted KLM's operations, with flights over France and Germany prohibited, and many of its aircraft painted in overall orange to limit the potential for confusion with military aircraft. European routes were limited to services to Scandinavia, Belgium and the UK, with flights to Lisbon (bypassing both British and French airspace) starting in April 1940.

When Germany invaded the Netherlands on 10 May 1940, several KLM aircraft—mostly DC-3s and a few DC-2s—were en route to or from the Far East, or were operating services in Europe. Five DC-3s and one DC-2 were taken to Britain. During the war, these aircraft and crew members flew scheduled passenger flights between Bristol and Lisbon under BOAC flight numbers and registration.

On 3 March 1942, Douglas DC-3 PH-ALP "Pelikaan", then registered as PK-AFV, was shot down over Western Australia by Imperial Japanese Navy Air Service Mitsubishi A6M Zeros during the attack on Broome while carrying a package of diamonds. The DC-3 crash landed at Carnot Bay, 80 kilometers from Broome. Pelikaan was subsequently strafed by the Zeros that had shot it down, killing three passengers and the flight engineer. Diamonds worth an estimated 150,000–300,000 Australian pounds were stolen from the wreckage of the aircraft, and nobody has been convicted of the crime.

Douglas DC-3 PH-ALI "Ibis", then registered as G-AGBB, was attacked by the Luftwaffe on 15 November 1942, 19 April 1943, and finally shot down on 1 June 1943 as BOAC Flight 777, killing all passengers and crew.

Some KLM aircraft and their crews ended up in the Australia-Dutch East Indies region, where they helped transport refugees from Japanese aggression in that area.

Although operations paused in Europe, KLM continued to fly and expand in the Caribbean.

==== Post-World War II ====
Revenue passenger-kilometers, scheduled flights only, in millions
Year	Traffic
1947	454
1950	766
1955	1,485
1960	2,660
1965	3,342
1971	6,330
1975	10,077
1980	14,058
1985	18,039
1995	44,458

After the end of the Second World War in August 1945, KLM immediately started to rebuild its network. Since the Dutch East Indies were in a state of revolt, Plesman prioritised re-establishing KLM's route to Batavia. This service was reinstated by the end of 1945. Domestic and European flights resumed in September 1945, initially with a fleet of Douglas DC-3s and Douglas DC-4s. On 21 May 1946, KLM was the first continental European airline to start scheduled transatlantic flights between Amsterdam and New York City using Douglas DC-4 aircraft. By 1948, KLM had reconstructed its network and services to Africa, North and South America, and the Caribbean resumed.

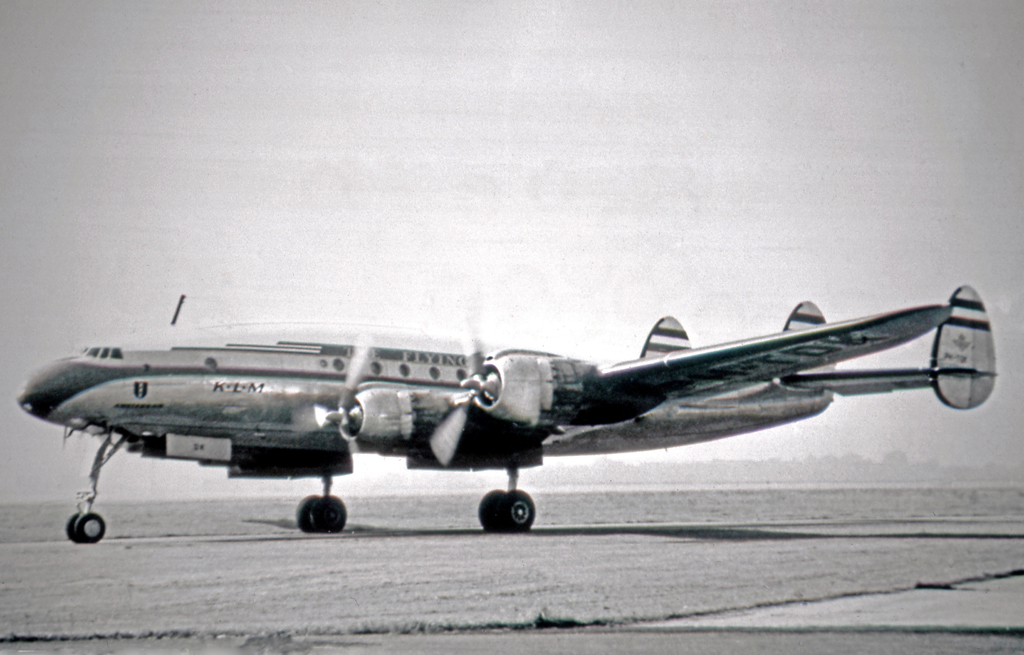
Lockheed L-749A Constellation of KLM in 1953

Long-range, pressurized Lockheed Constellations and Douglas DC-6s joined KLM's fleet in the late 1940s; the Convair 240 short-range pressurized twin-engine airliner began European flights for the company in late 1948.

During the immediate post-war period, the Dutch government expressed interest in gaining a majority stake in KLM, thus partially nationalizing it. Plesman wanted KLM to remain a private company under private control; he allowed the Dutch government to acquire a minority stake in the airline. In 1950, KLM carried 356,069 passengers. The expansion of the network continued in the 1950s with the addition of several destinations in western North America. KLM's fleet expanded with the addition of new versions of the Lockheed Constellation and Lockheed Electra, of which KLM was the first European airline to fly.

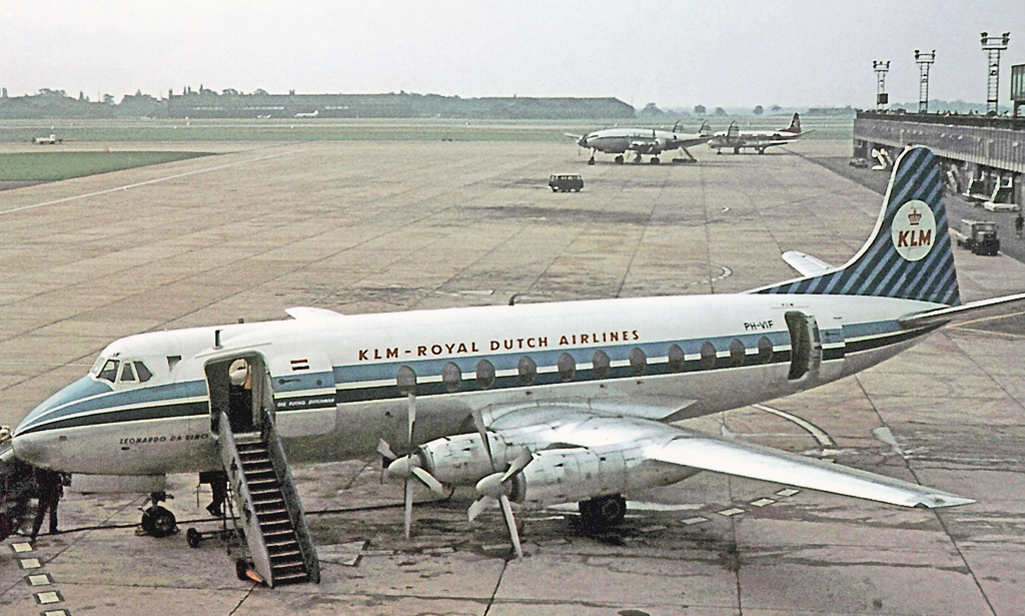
KLM Vickers Viscount 803

On 31 December 1953, the founder and president of KLM, Albert Plesman, died at the age of 64. He was succeeded as president by Fons Aler. After Plesman's death, the company and other airlines entered a difficult economic period. The conversion to jet aircraft placed a further financial burden on KLM. The Netherlands government increased its ownership of the company to two-thirds, thus partly nationalizing it. The board of directors remained under the control of private shareholders.

On 25 July 1957, the airline introduced its flight simulator for the Douglas DC-7C – the last KLM aircraft with piston engines – which opened the transpolar route from Amsterdam via Anchorage to Tokyo on 1 November 1958. Each crew flying the transpolar route over the Arctic was equipped with a winter survival kit, including a 7.62 mm selective-fire AR-10 carbine for use against polar bears, in the event the plane was forced down onto the polar ice. The four-engine turboprop Vickers Viscount 800 was introduced on European routes in 1957. Beginning in September 1959, KLM introduced the four-engine turboprop Lockheed L-188 Electra onto some of its European and Middle Eastern routes.

=== 1960s–1970s: Jet age ===
In March 1960, the airline introduced the first Douglas DC-8 jet into its fleet. In 1961, KLM reported its first year of losses. In 1961, the airline's president Fons Aler was succeeded by Ernst van der Beugel. However, this leadership change did not lead to a reversal of KLM's financial difficulties. Van der Beugel resigned as president in 1963 for health reasons. Horatius Albarda was appointed to succeed Ernst van der Beugel as president of KLM in 1963. Albarda initiated a reorganization of the company, which led to the reduction of staff and air services. In 1965, Albarda died in an air crash and was succeeded as president by Dr. Gerrit van der Wal. Van der Wal forged an agreement with the Dutch government that KLM would be once again run as a private company. By 1966, the stake of the Dutch government in KLM was reduced to a minority stake of 49.5%. In 1966, KLM introduced the Douglas DC-9 on European and Middle East routes.

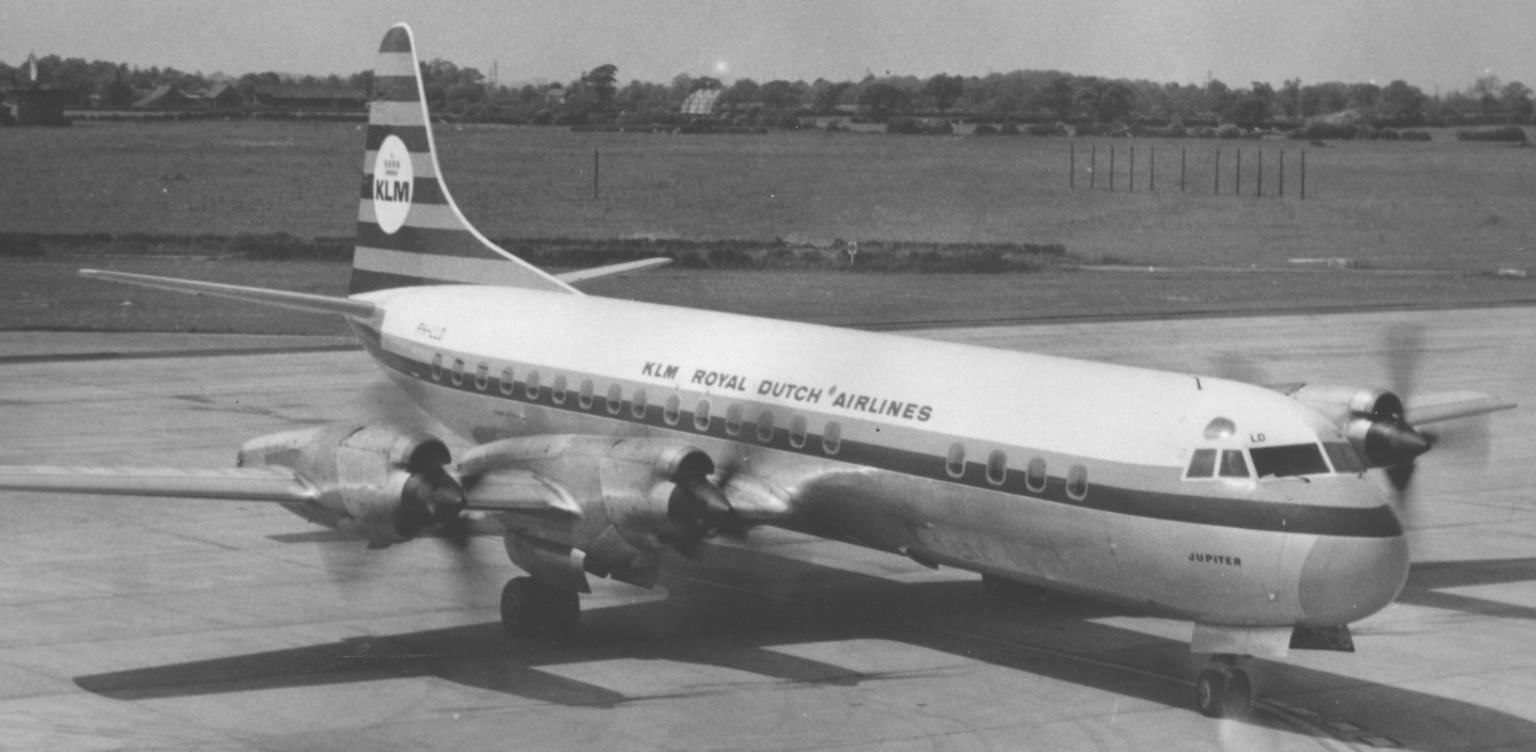
KLM Lockheed L-188 Electra turboprop airliner in 1965

The new terminal buildings at Amsterdam Airport Schiphol opened in April 1967, and in 1968 the stretched Douglas DC-8-63 ("Super DC-8") entered service. With 244 seats, the Super DC-8 was the largest airliner in scheduled passenger service at the time, although its size was surpassed by that of the Boeing 747 first flown in 1969. On 6 March 1967, KLM ordered the 747 as its first Boeing aircraft, which marked the beginning of its use of widebody aircraft and an improved relationship between the airline and Boeing since the 1939 crash of a Boeing 307 Stratoliner carrying KLM representatives on a demonstration flight. To negotiate for lower unit prices and form a maintenance pool for its 747 fleet, KLM formed the KSS maintenance consortium in 1969 with Scandinavian Airlines and Swissair. Despite showing initial interest in the prototype 747-100 variant, KLM instead acquired the higher-gross-weight 747-200B powered by Pratt & Whitney JT9D engines, becoming the first airline to put the type into service on 14 February 1971. In March 1971, KLM opened its current headquarters in Amstelveen. In 1972, it purchased the first of several McDonnell Douglas DC-10 aircraft—McDonnell Douglas's response to the 747.

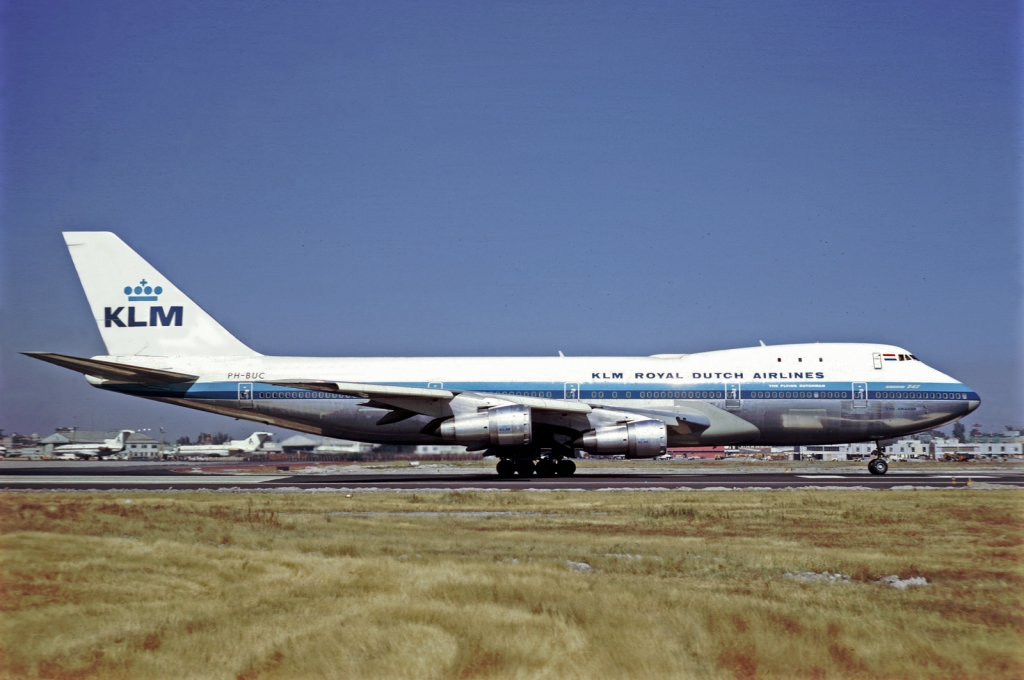
KLM Boeing 747-206B in 1971. The 747 was KLM's first widebody aircraft and served the airline as one of its primary long-haul types from 1971 until 2020.

In 1973, Sergio Orlandini was appointed to succeed Gerrit van der Wal as president of KLM. At the time, KLM, as well as other airlines, had to deal with overcapacity. Orlandini proposed to convert KLM 747s to "combis" that could carry a combination of passengers and freight in a mixed configuration on the main deck of the aircraft. In November 1975, the first of these seven Boeing 747-200BM Combi aircraft were added to the KLM fleet. The airline previously operated DC-8 passenger and freight combi aircraft as well and later operated Boeing 747-400 combi aircraft.

The 1973 oil crisis, which caused difficult economic conditions, led KLM to seek government assistance in arranging debt refinancing. The airline issued additional shares of stock to the government in return for its money. In the late 1970s, the government's stake had again increased to a majority of 78%, effectively re-nationalizing it. The company management remained under the control of private stakeholders.

=== 1980s–1990s: International expansion ===
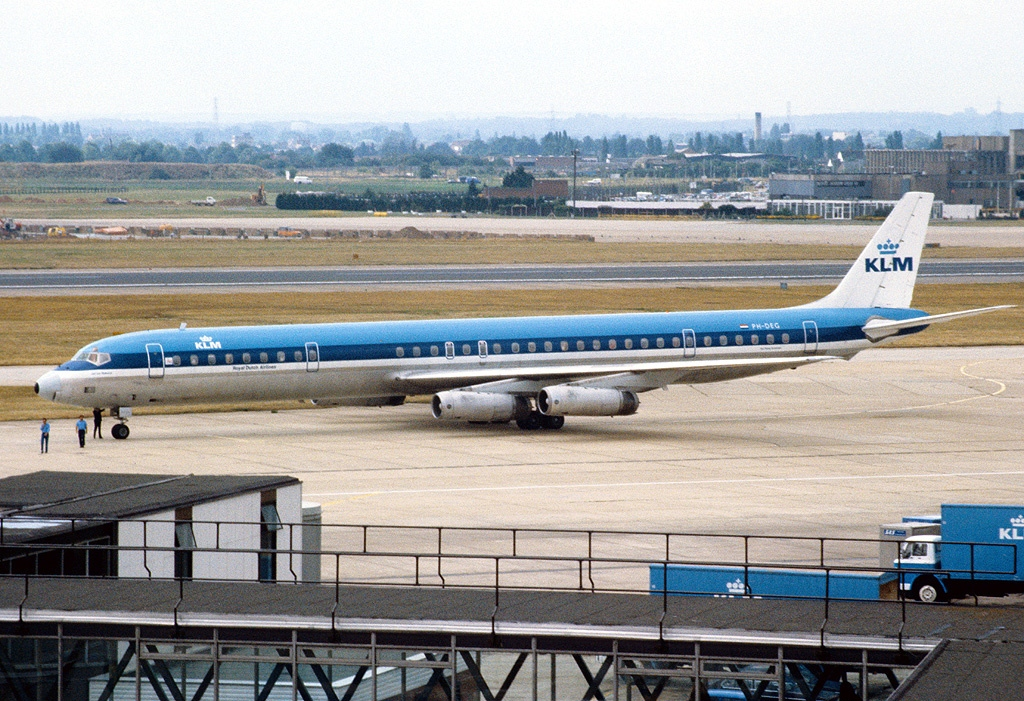
KLM Douglas DC-8-63 at London Heathrow Airport in 1982. The DC-8 was the mainstay of the KLM narrowbody jet fleet.

In 1980, KLM carried 9,715,069 passengers. In 1983, it reached an agreement with Boeing to upgrade ten of its Boeing 747-200 aircraft (Three 747-200Bs and seven 747-200Ms) with the stretched-upper-deck modification. The work started in 1984 at the Boeing factory in Everett, Washington, and finished in 1986. The converted aircraft were called Boeing 747-200SUD or 747-300, which the airline operated in addition to three newly built Boeing 747-300s manufactured from the ground up. In 1983, KLM took delivery of the first of ten Airbus A310 passenger jets. Sergio Orlandini retired in 1987 and was succeeded as president of KLM by Jan de Soet. In 1986, the Dutch government's shareholding in KLM was reduced to 54.8 percent. It was expected that this share would be further reduced during the decade. The Boeing 747-400 was introduced into KLM's fleet in June 1989.

With the liberalization of the European market, KLM started developing its hub at Amsterdam Airport Schiphol by feeding its network with traffic from affiliated airlines. As part of its development of a worldwide network, KLM acquired a 20% stake in Northwest Airlines in July 1989. In 1990, KLM carried 16,000,000 passengers. KLM president Jan de Soet retired at the end of 1990 and was succeeded in 1991 by Pieter Bouw. In December 1991, KLM was the first European airline to introduce a frequent flyer loyalty program, which was called Flying Dutchman.

==== Joint venture with Northwest Airlines ====
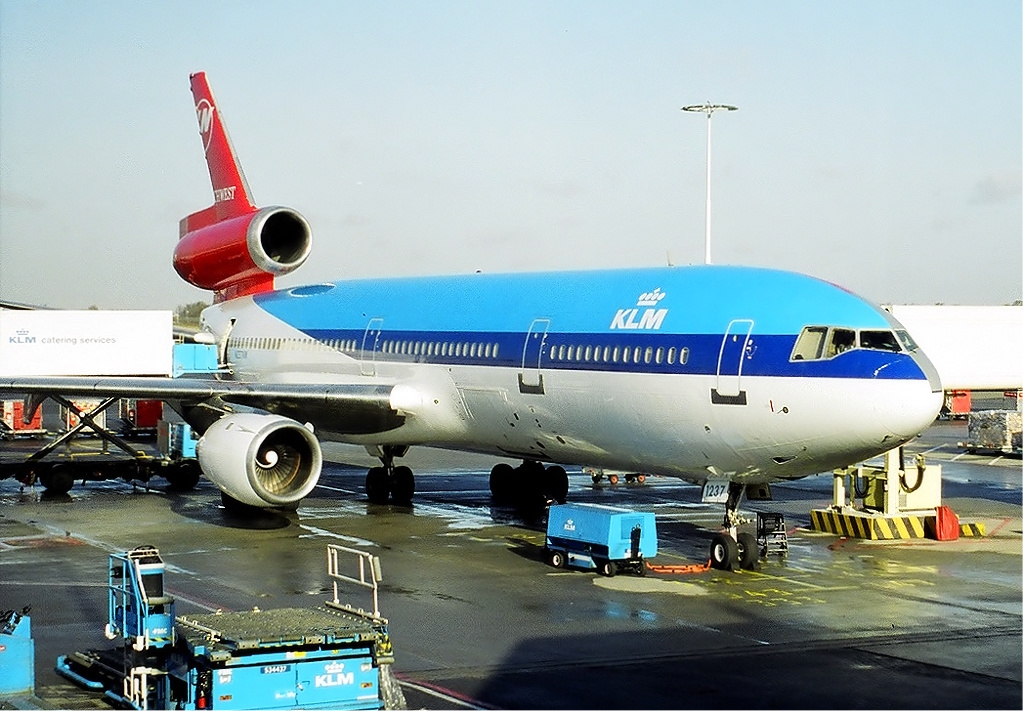
A McDonnell Douglas DC-10 operated by Northwest Airlines in a hybrid Northwest-KLM livery (1999). This photo shows the starboard (above) and port side of the aircraft (below).

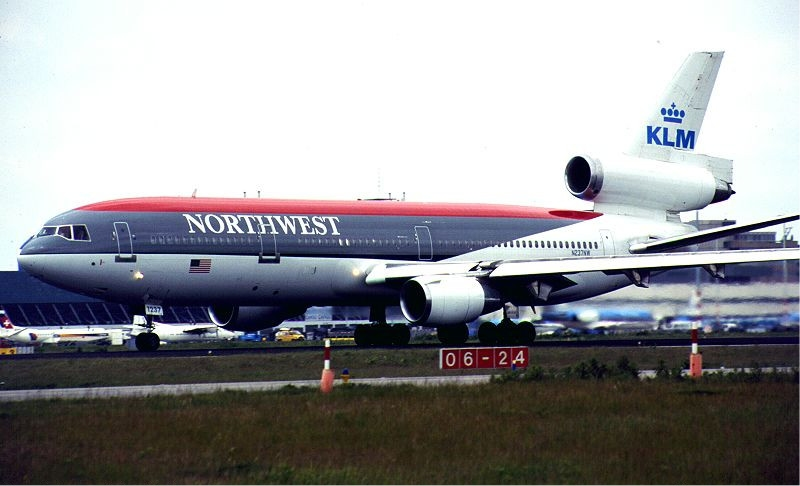

In January 1993, the United States Department of Transportation granted KLM and Northwest Airlines anti-trust immunity, which allowed them to intensify their partnership. As of September 1993, the airlines operated their flights between the United States and Europe as part of a joint venture. In March 1994, KLM and Northwest Airlines introduced World Business Class on intercontinental routes. KLM's stake in Northwest Airlines was increased to 25% in 1994.

KLM introduced the Boeing 767-300ER in July 1995. In January 1996, KLM acquired a 26% share in Kenya Airways, the flag-carrier airline of Kenya. In 1997, Pieter Bouw resigned as president of KLM and was succeeded by Leo van Wijk. In August 1998, KLM repurchased all regular shares from the Dutch government to make KLM a private company. On 1 November 1999, KLM founded AirCares, a communication and fundraising platform supporting worthy causes and focusing on underprivileged children.

KLM renewed its intercontinental fleets by replacing the Boeing 767s, Boeing 747-300s, and eventually, the McDonnell Douglas MD-11s with Boeing 777-200ERs and Airbus A330-200s. Some 747s were withdrawn from service first. The MD-11s remained in service until October 2014. The first Boeing 777 was received on 25 October 2003, while the first Airbus A330-200 was introduced on 25 August 2005.

=== 2000s: Air France-KLM merger ===
On 30 September 2003, Air France and KLM agreed to a merger plan in which Air France and KLM would become subsidiaries of a holding company called Air France-KLM. Both airlines would retain their own brands; both Charles de Gaulle Airport and Amsterdam Airport Schiphol would become key hubs. In February 2004, the European Commission and United States Department of Justice approved the proposed merger of the airlines. In April 2004, an exchange offer in which KLM shareholders exchanged their KLM shares for Air France shares took place. Since 5 May 2004, Air France-KLM has been listed on the Euronext exchanges in Paris, Amsterdam and New York. In September 2004, the merger was completed by creation of the Air France-KLM holding company. The merger resulted in the world's largest airline group and should have led to an estimated annual cost-saving of between €400 million and €500 million.

It did not appear that KLM's longstanding joint venture with Northwest Airlines—which merged with Delta Air Lines in 2008—was affected by the merger with Air France. KLM and Northwest joined the SkyTeam alliance in September 2004. Also in 2004, senior management came under fire for providing itself with controversial bonuses after the merger with Air France, while 4,500 jobs were lost at KLM. After external pressure, management gave up on these bonuses.

In March 2007, KLM started to use the Amadeus CRS reservation system, along with partner Kenya Airways. After 10 years as president of the airline, Leo van Wijk resigned from his position and was succeeded by Peter Hartman.

=== 2010s ===
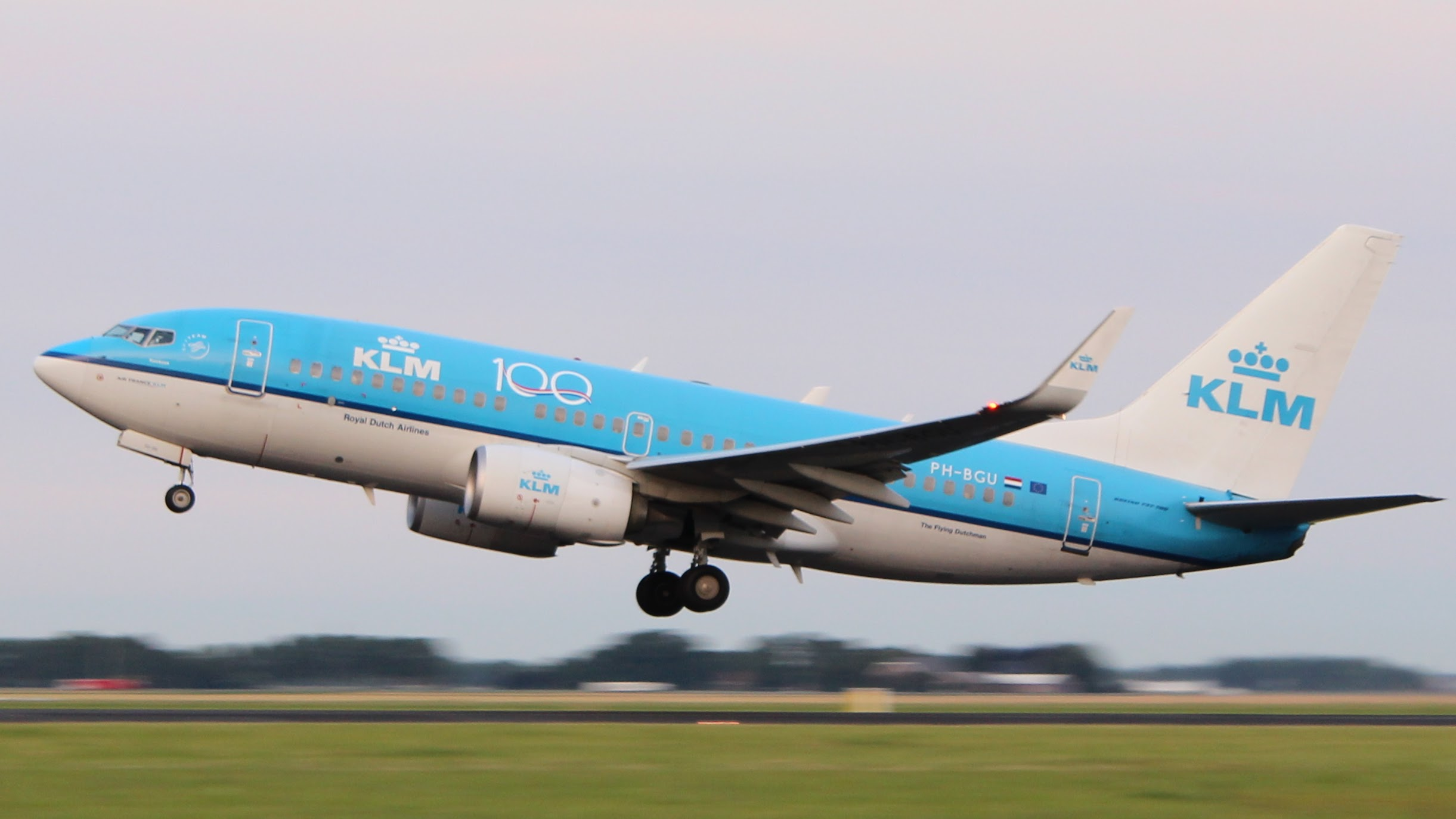
KLM Boeing 737-700 in centennial livery taking off from Amsterdam Schiphol Airport

Beginning in September 2010, KLM integrated the passenger division of Martinair into KLM, transferring all personnel and routes. By November 2011, Martinair consisted of only the cargo and maintenance division. In March 2011, KLM and InselAir reached an agreement for cooperation on InselAir destinations, thus expanding its passenger services. Beginning 27 March 2011, KLM passengers could fly to all InselAir destinations through InselAir's hubs in Curaçao and Sint Maarten. This cooperation was extended to a code share agreement in 2012. In early 2018, the cooperation with Inselair was terminated, including any interlining agreements, after Inselair found itself in financial difficulties which forced the airline to sell off part of its fleet and cancel some of its routes.

On 20 February 2013, KLM announced that Peter Hartman would resign as president and CEO of KLM on 1 July 2013. He was succeeded by Camiel Eurlings. Hartman remained employed by the company until he retired on 1 January 2014. On 15 October 2014, KLM announced that Eurlings, in joint consultation with the supervisory board, had decided to immediately resign as president and CEO. As of this date, he was succeeded by Pieter Elbers. KLM received the award for "Best Airline Staff Service" in Europe at the World Airline Awards 2013. This award represents the rating for an airline's performance across both airport staff and cabin staff combined. It is the second consecutive year that KLM won this award; in 2012 it was awarded this title as well. On 19 June 2012, KLM made the first transatlantic flight fueled partly by sustainable biofuels to Rio de Janeiro. This was the longest distance any aircraft had flown on biofuels.

In 2019, KLM celebrated its centennial, as it was founded in 1919. Since it is the oldest airline still operating under its original name, it was the first airline to achieve this feat.

=== 2020s ===
Being heavily affected by the COVID-19 pandemic, KLM cut at least 6,000 jobs in total. It also said that the decision of the government to have all the passengers and crew COVID-19 tested before flying will have an impact on its flights. On 16 December 2021, Air France-KLM announced an order for 100 Airbus A320neos to be divided between Transavia and KLM. In July 2022, KLM was forced to cut their summer schedule due to disruption at airports across Europe.

== Corporate affairs and identity ==
=== Business trends ===
Key business and operating results of KLM are shown below (as at year ending 31 December):

	Revenue (€ bn)	Net profit (€ m)	Number of employees	Number of passengers (m)	Passenger load factor (%)	Number of aircraft (Note: (at year end) (incl. cargo, regional, Transavia and training aircraft))	References
2011	8.9	1	37,169	25.3	84.3	204	
2012	9.4	−98	35,787	25.8	85.7	203	
2013	9.6	133	35,662	26.6	85.8	206	
2014	9.6	341	35,685	27.7	86.5	202	
2015	9.9	54	35,488	28.6	86.4	199	
2016	9.8	519	34,363	30.4	87.2	203	
2017	10.3	−497	34,872	32.7	88.4	204	
2018	10.9	573	35,410	34.2	89.1	214	
2019	11.0	449	36,549	35.1	89.4	229	
2020	5.1	−1,546	32,667	11.2	52.2	218	
2021	6.0	−1,258	31,551	14.0	49.6	218	
2022	10.6	744	33,358	25.8	83.4	225	
2023	12.0	714	35,145	30.3	87.1	238	
2024	12.6	70	36,071	33.1	88.2	224	
2025	13,2	416	33,113	34,5	87,2	185	

=== Management ===
As of July 2022, KLM's corporate leader is its president and chief executive officer (CEO) Marjan Rintel, who succeeded Pieter Elbers. The president and CEO is part of the larger Executive Committee, which manages KLM and consists of the statutory managing directors and executive vice-presidents of KLM's business units that are represented in the Executive Committee. The supervision and management of KLM are structured following the two-tier model; the Board of Managing Directors is supervised by a separate and independent Supervisory Board. The Supervisory Board also supervises the general performance of KLM. The Board of Managing Directors is formed by the four Managing Directors, including the CEO. Nine Supervisory Directors compose the Supervisory Board.

=== Head office ===
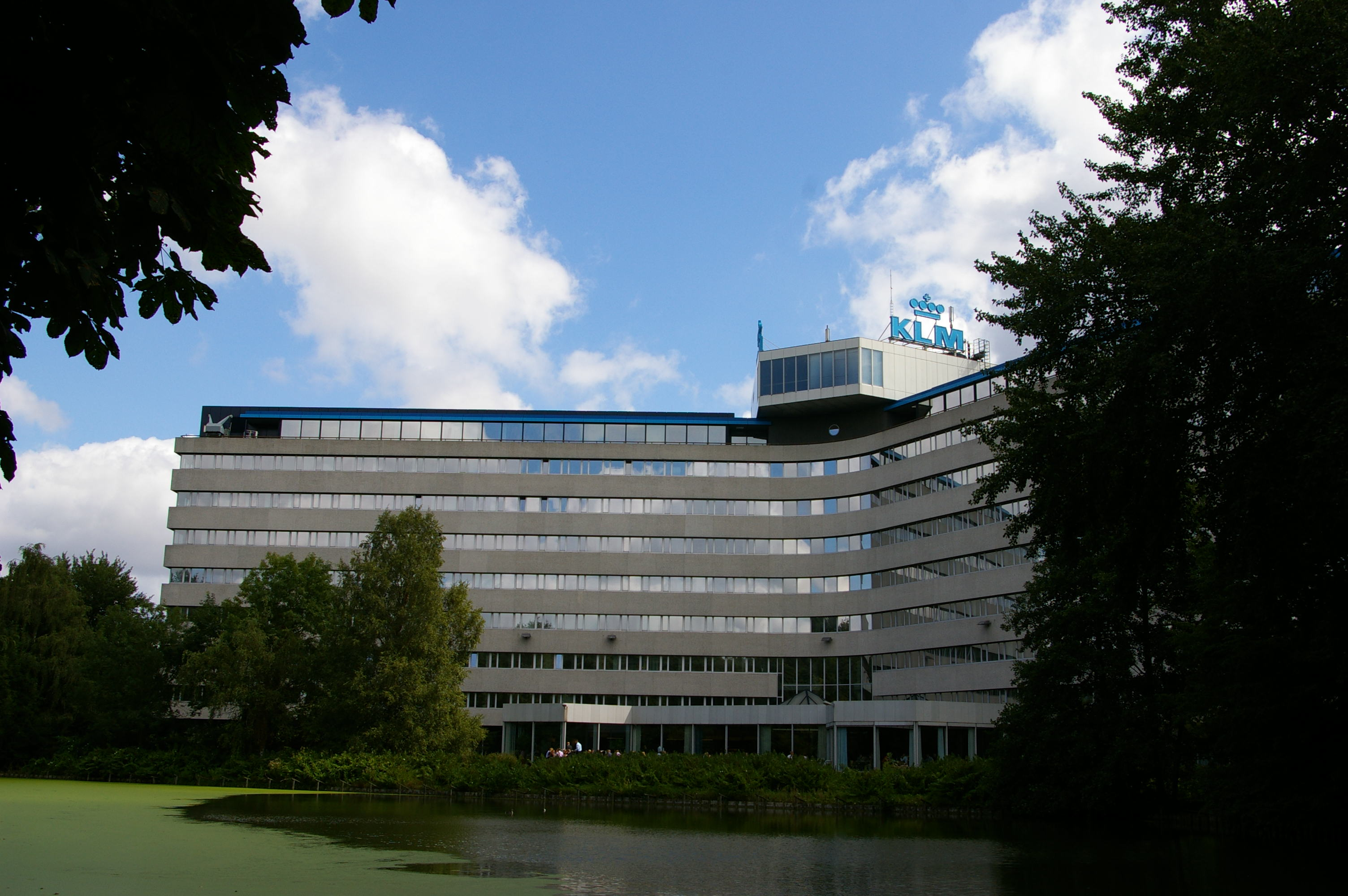
KLM head office in Amstelveen

KLM's head office is located in Amstelveen, on a 6.5-hectare (16-acre) site near Schiphol Airport. The airline's current headquarters was built between 1968 and 1970. Before the opening of the new headquarters, the airline's head office was on the property of Schiphol Airport in Haarlemmermeer.

=== Subsidiaries ===
Companies in which KLM has a stake include:

Company	Type	Principal activities	Incorporated in	Group's equity shareholding
Transavia Airlines CV	Subsidiary	Airline	Netherlands	100%
KLM Cityhopper BV	Subsidiary	Airline	Netherlands	100%
KLM Cityhopper UK Ltd.	Subsidiary	Airline	United Kingdom	100%
KLM Asia	Subsidiary	Airline	Taiwan	100%
Martinair Holland NV	Subsidiary	Cargo airline	Netherlands	100%
EPCOR BV	Subsidiary	Maintenance	Netherlands	100%
KLM Catering Services Schiphol BV	Subsidiary	Catering services	Netherlands	100%
KLM Financial Services	Subsidiary	Financing	Netherlands	100%
KLM Flight Academy BV	Subsidiary	Flight academy	Netherlands	100%
KLM Health Services BV	Subsidiary	Health services	Netherlands	100%
KLM UK Engineering Ltd.	Subsidiary	Engineering and maintenance	United Kingdom	100%
Cygnific	Subsidiary	Sales and service	Netherlands	100%
Schiphol Logistics Park	Joint controlled entity	Logistics	Netherlands	53% (45% voting right)

=== Former subsidiaries ===
Subsidiaries, associates, and joint ventures of KLM in the past include:

Company	Type	Year of establishment	Year of rejection	Notes	References
Cobalt Ground Solutions	Subsidiary	1995	2017	UK based ground handling (60% share)	
Air Ceylon	Subsidiary	1953	1961	Bought 49% stake from Australian National Airways, later reduced to 25% and sold stake in the Airline in 1961.	
Air UK	Associate	1987	1998	Renamed KLM uk upon obtaining majority stake	
Braathens	Joint venture	1998	2003	—	
Buzz	Subsidiary	2000	2003	Sold to Ryanair	
De Kroonduif	Subsidiary	1955	1963	Acquired by Garuda Indonesia	
KLM alps	Subsidiary	1998	2001	Franchise agreement with Air Engiadina and Air Alps	
KLM exel	Subsidiary	1991	2004	—	
KLM Helikopters	Subsidiary	1965	1998	Sold to Schreiner Airways	
KLM Interinsulair Bedrijf (KLM-IIB)	Subsidiary	1947	1949	Nationalized and renamed Garuda Indonesia	
KLM uk	Subsidiary	1998	2002	Merged with KLM Cityhopper	
NetherLines	Subsidiary	1988	1991	Merged with NLM CityHopper and formed KLM Cityhopper	
NLM CityHopper	Subsidiary	1966	1991	Merged with NetherLines and formed KLM Cityhopper	
High Speed Alliance	Subsidiary	2007	2014	5% (10% voting) share before it became NS International	
KLM Equipment Services BV	Subsidiary		2024	Sold to TCR International	

KLM also worked closely with ALM Antillean Airlines in the Caribbean to provide air service for the Dutch-controlled islands in the region with KLM aircraft such as the Douglas DC-8 and McDonnell Douglas DC-9-30 being operated by KLM flight crews on behalf of ALM.

=== KLM Asia ===
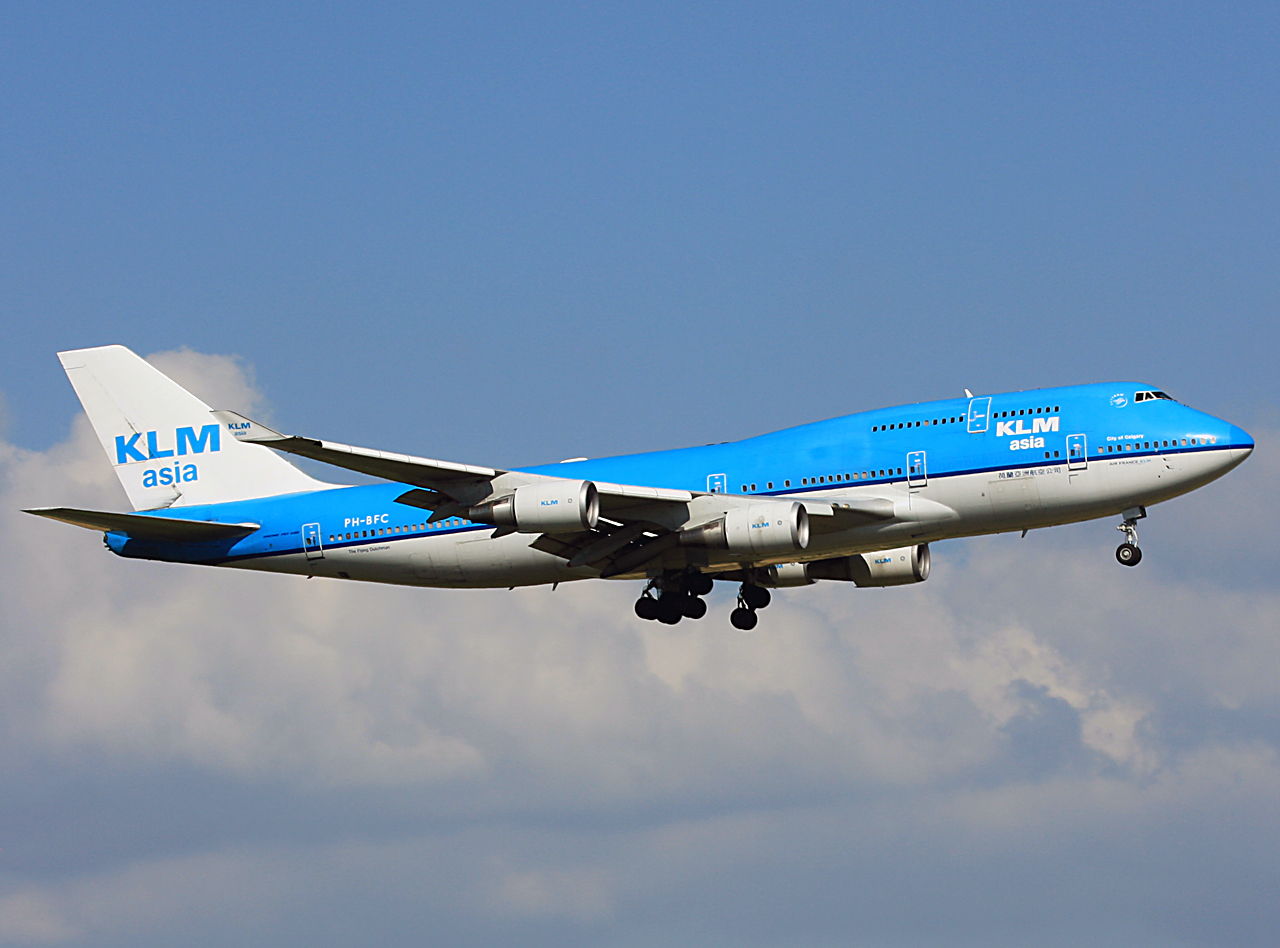
A Boeing 747-400 Combi in KLM Asia livery. Pictured is the aircraft involved in the KLM Flight 867 incident. It served the subsidiary from 1995 to 2012 before being transferred to KLM and repainted in the mainline KLM livery, where it remained in service until 2018.

KLM Asia (Chinese: 荷蘭亞洲航空公司; pinyin: Hélán Yàzhōu Hángkōng Gōngsī) is a wholly owned subsidiary registered in Taiwan. The subsidiary was established in 1995 to allow KLM to continue operating flights to Taipei without compromising the mainline KLM's traffic rights for destinations in the People's Republic of China. Aircraft operated by the subsidiary retain their Dutch registration and the basic KLM livery but receive several modifications: the flags of both the Netherlands and European Union are removed while the Dutch Crown logo is replaced with the KLM Asia wordmark.

The fleet of aircraft operated by the subsidiary consists of seven Boeing 777-200ER and two Boeing 777-300ER aircraft as of March 2020. As of 2012, KLM used the "KLM Asia" brand to fly to Taipei and the aircraft had to fly over China. Previously, KLM used Boeing 747s for its services to Taiwan. In 2012, it started operating the revised Amsterdam-Taipei-Manila route with Boeing 777-200ER aircraft.

KLM Asia aircraft are also occasionally used in services to other destinations, including China, in the wider KLM network.

=== Branding ===
Dirk Roosenburg designed the KLM logo at its establishment in 1919; he intertwined the letters K, L, and M, and gave them wings and a crown. The crown was depicted to denote KLM's royal status, which was granted at KLM's establishment. The logo became known as the "vinklogo" in reference to the common chaffinch. The KLM logo was largely redesigned in 1961 by F.H.K. Henrion. The crown, redesigned using a line, four blue circles and a cross, was retained. In 1991, the logo was further revised by Chris Ludlow of Henrion, Ludlow & Schmidt. In addition to its main logo, KLM displays its alliance status in its branding, including "Worldwide Reliability" with Northwest Airlines (1993–2002) and the SkyTeam alliance (2004–present).

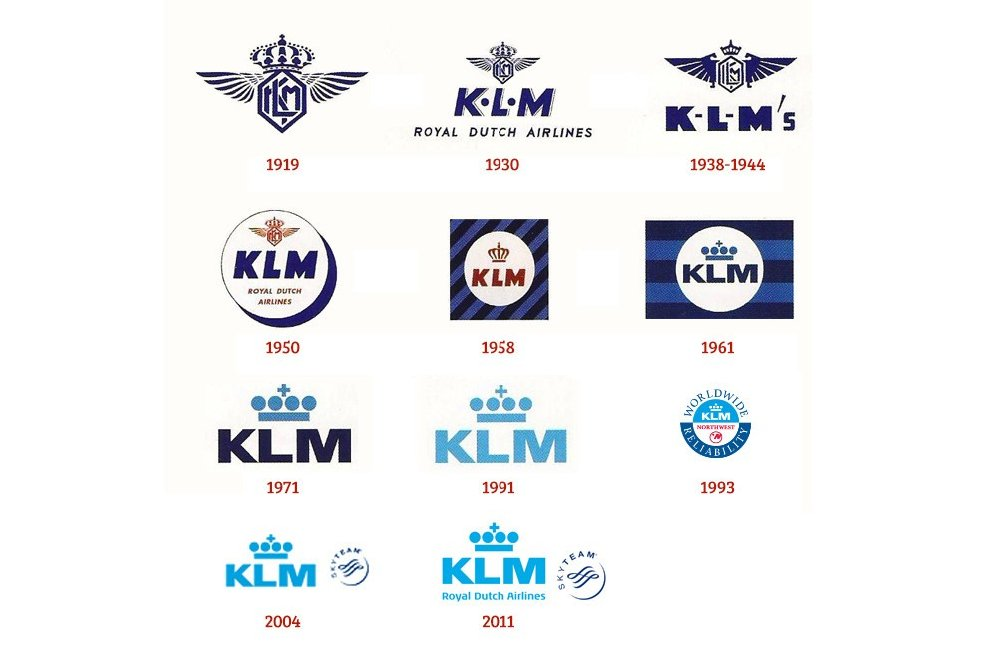
Evolution of the KLM logo

==== Livery and uniforms ====
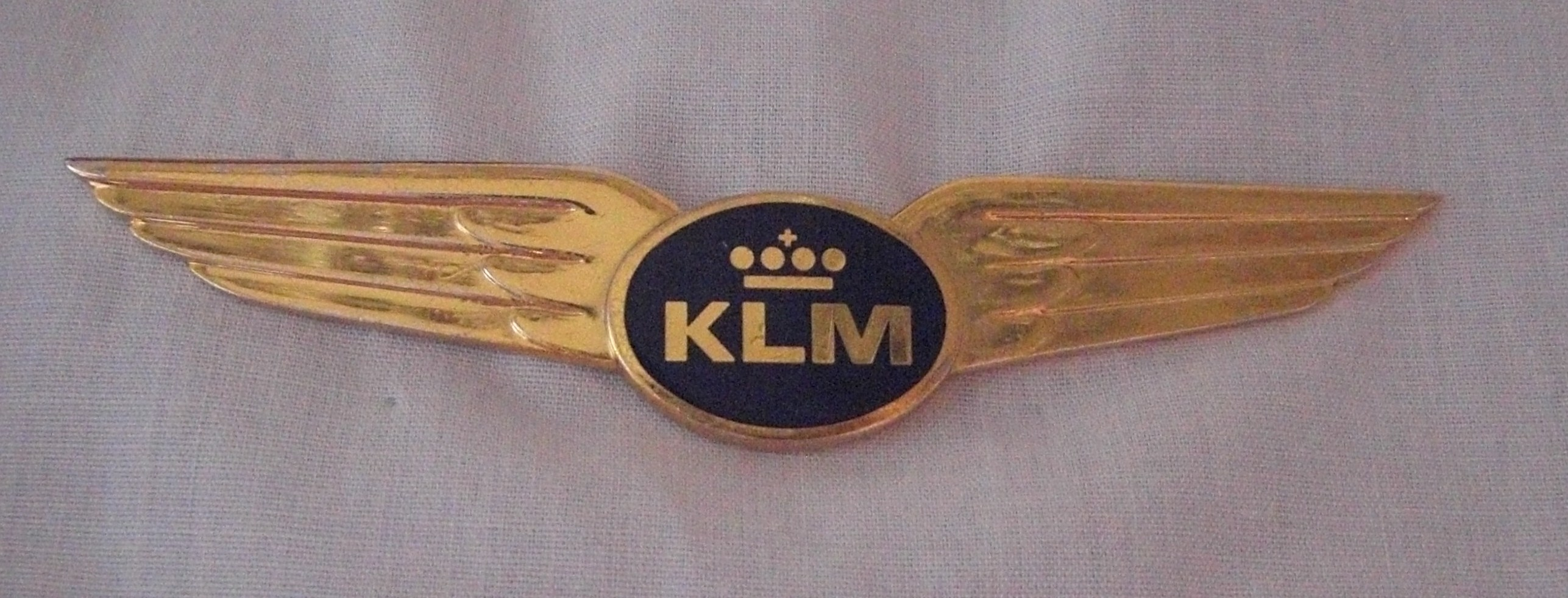
A current KLM pilot wing

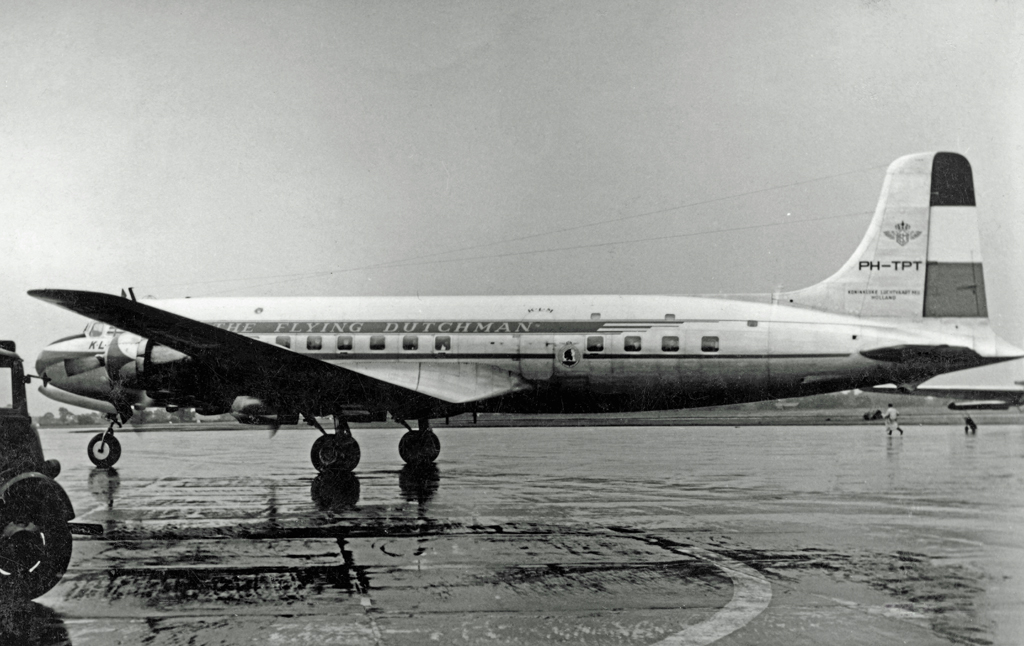
One of KLM's Douglas DC-6s in 1953

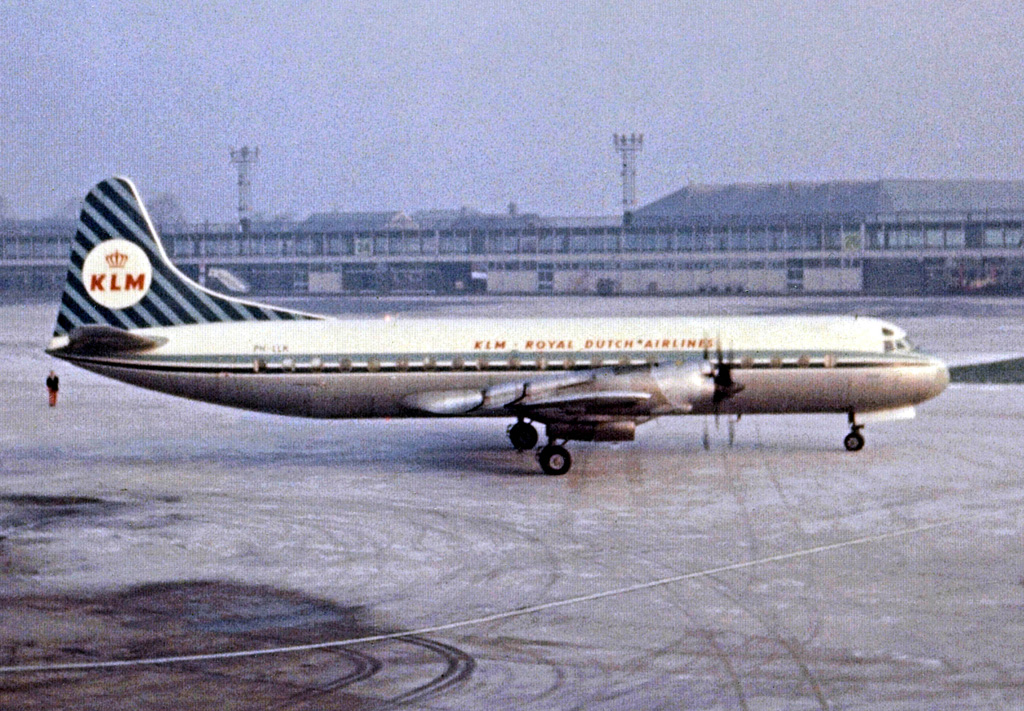
KLM Lockheed L-188 Electra in the airline's 1950s livery

KLM has utilized several major liveries since its founding, with numerous variations on each. Initially, many aircraft featured a bare-metal fuselage with a stripe above the windows bearing the phrase "The Flying Dutchman". The rudder was divided into three segments and painted to match the Dutch flag. Later aircraft types sometimes bore a white upper fuselage, and additional detail striping and titling. In the mid 1950s, the livery was changed to feature a split cheatline in two shades of blue on a white upper fuselage and angled blue stripes on the vertical stabilizer. The tail stripes were later enlarged and made horizontal, and the then-new crown logo was placed in a white circle. The final major variation of this livery saw the vertical stabilizer painted completely white with the crown logo in the center. All versions of this livery had small "KLM Royal Dutch Airlines" titles, first in red, and later in blue.

Since 1971, the KLM livery has primarily featured a bright blue fuselage, with variations on the striping and details. Originally a wide, dark blue cheatline covered the windows and was separated from the light grey lower fuselage by a thin white stripe. The KLM logo was placed centrally on the white tail and the front of the fuselage. In December 2002, KLM introduced an updated livery in which the white strip was removed and the dark-blue cheatline was significantly narrowed. The bright blue colour was retained and now covers most of the fuselage. The KLM logo was placed more centrally on the fuselage while its position on the tail and the tail design remained the same. In 2014, KLM modified its livery with a swooping cheatline that wraps around the entire forward fuselage. The livery was first introduced on Embraer E190s.

In April 2010, KLM introduced new uniforms for its female cabin attendants, ground attendants and pilots at KLM and KLM Cityhopper. The new uniform was designed by Dutch couturier Mart Visser. It retains the KLM blue colour that was introduced in 1971 and adds a touch of orange—the national colour of the Netherlands.

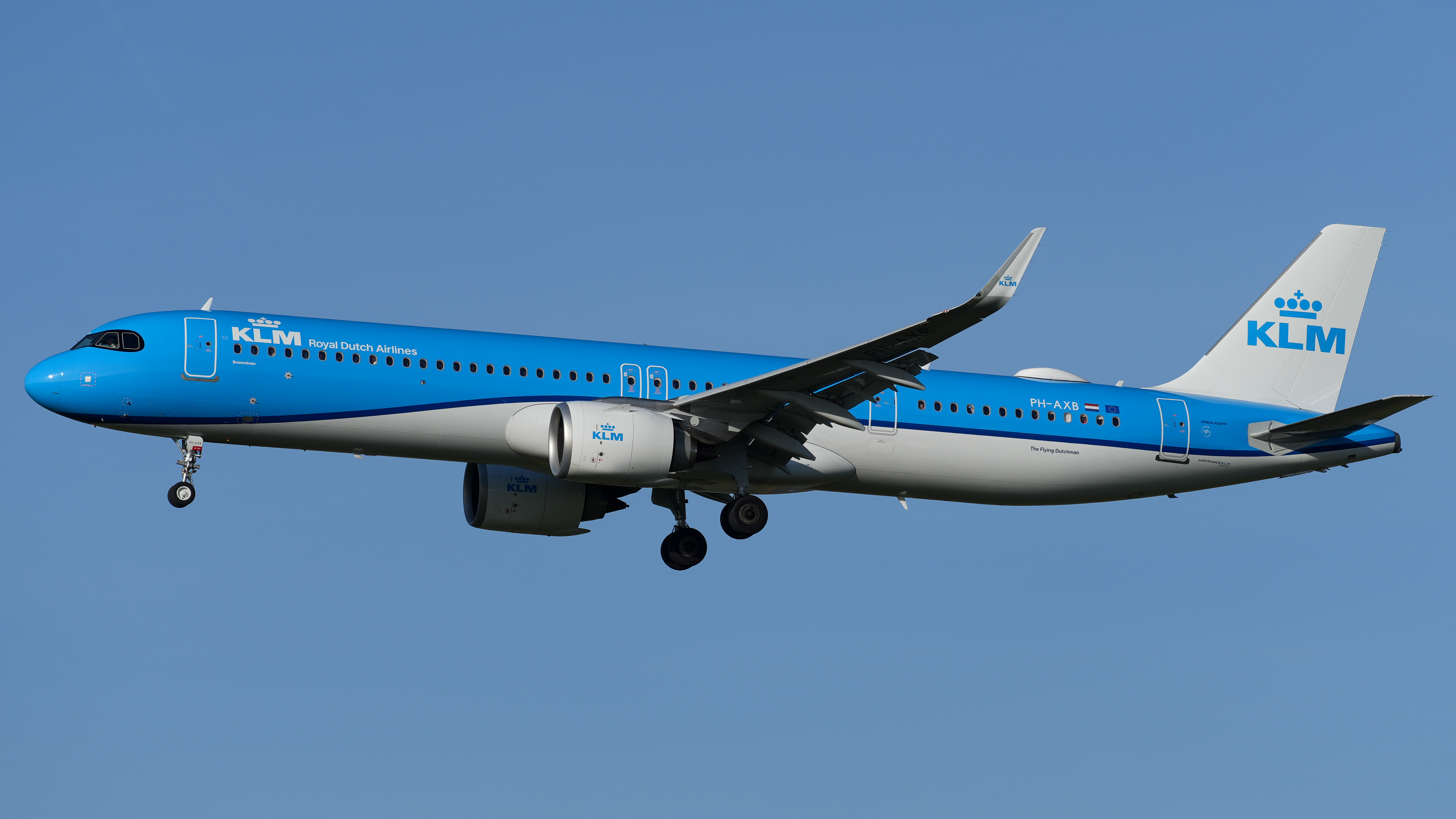
KLM Airbus A321neo in the 2024 livery

In August 2024, KLM introduced a brand new livery on its first Airbus A321neo with the blue section now fully covers the nose dome and the SkyTeam logo together with the Air France-KLM Group logo moved from the nose section to the tail section. The logo and the font has also been changed slightly for a more modernized feel.

==== Marketing slogans ====
KLM has used several slogans for marketing throughout its operational history:

- "The businessman travels, sends, and receives by KLM" (translated from Dutch) (1920s)
- "The Flying Dutchman"
- "Bridging the World" (1994)
- "The Reliable Airline"
- "Journeys of Inspiration" (2009–present)

=== Social media ===
KLM has an extensive presence on social media platforms and also runs a blog. Customers can make inquiries through these channels. The airline also uses these networks to inform customers of KLM news, marketing campaigns and promotions.

The airline's use of social media platforms to reach customers peaked when the Icelandic volcano Eyjafjallajökull erupted in April 2010, causing widespread disruption to air traffic. Customers used the social networks to contact the airline, which used them to provide information about the situation. Following the increased use of social media, KLM created a centralized, public social media website named the Social Media Hub in October 2010.

KLM has developed several services based on these social platforms, including:

- Meet & Seat; this service allows passengers to find information about people who will be on the same KLM flight by connecting their Facebook or LinkedIn profiles to the flight. Meet & Seat facilitates contact with fellow travellers who have the same background or interests. By launching Meet & Seat, KLM became the first airline to integrate social networking into its regular flight process.
- Trip Planner; this platform uses Facebook to organize a trip with Facebook friends.
- Twitterbots; KLM operates several Twitterbots, including one to request the current status of a flight and one to request the lowest KLM fares to a destination on a specified date or month.

In June 2013, KLM launched its own 3D strategy game "Aviation Empire" for iOS and Android platforms. The game allows users to experience airline management. Players manage KLM from its establishment until the present; they can invest in a fleet, build a network with international destinations and develop airports. The game combines the digital world with the real world by enabling the unlocking of airports by GPS check-ins.

=== Philanthropy ===
KLM started KLM AirCares, a program that aids underprivileged children in developing countries to which KLM flies, in 1999. The airline collects money and airmiles from passengers. In 2012, new applications for support from the program were suspended because it needed an overhaul.

== Destinations ==
KLM and its partners serve 163 destinations in 70 countries on five continents from their hub at Amsterdam Airport Schiphol. Codeshare agreements bring the total amount of destinations available via KLM to 826.

In November 2024, KLM announced additional three new routes from Amsterdam; San Diego, Georgetown and Hyderabad which will commence in May, June and September respectively. The route to San Diego and Hyderabad will be direct flights connecting the two cities, while the flights to Georgetown will have a brief stopover in Sint Maarten.

=== Codeshare agreements ===
KLM has codeshare agreements with the following airlines:

- Aerolíneas Argentinas
- Aeroméxico
- Air Astana
- Air Europa
- Air France
- Air Mauritius
- Air Serbia
- airBaltic
- Airlink
- Atlantic Airways
- Bangkok Airways
- China Airlines
- China Eastern Airlines
- China Southern Airlines
- Copa Airlines
- Croatia Airlines
- Delta Air Lines
- El Al
- Eurostar (railway)
- Flair Airlines
- Garuda Indonesia
- Georgian Airways
- Gol Transportes Aéreos
- Gulf Air
- IndiGo
- ITA Airways
- Jetstar
- Kenya Airways
- KM Malta Airlines
- Korean Air
- Loganair
- Malaysia Airlines
- Middle East Airlines
- Oman Air
- Pegasus Airlines
- Qantas
- Saudia
- Scandinavian Airlines
- Sichuan Airlines
- TAROM
- Transavia
- Vietnam Airlines
- Virgin Atlantic
- WestJet
- Widerøe
- Winair
- XiamenAir

=== Interline agreements ===
KLM has Interline agreements with the following airlines:

- AeroItalia
- APG Airlines
- Air Astana
- Air France
- Airlink
- Batik Air Malaysia
- CemAir
- Copa Airlines
- Eurostar(railway)
- Flydubai
- Gulf Air
- Lao Airlines
- Loganair
- MIAT Mongolian Airlines
- NS International (railway)
- Royal Brunei Airlines
- Scandinavian Airlines
- Sky Airline
- Sky Express
- SNCF (railway)
- Swiss International Air Lines

== Fleet ==
=== Fleet strategy ===
KLM's first of eight Boeing 787-10 aircraft was delivered on 28 June 2019; it featured centennial markings.

On 19 June 2013, KLM ordered seven Airbus A350-900 aircraft. In June 2019, Air France-KLM announced that KLM will not take up any of the group's ordered A350 aircraft, because of fleet rationalization purposes.

CEO Ben Smith announced at Air France's Investor Day (5 November 2019) in Paris that "in the near future", KLM will only use the 777 and 787 as their long-haul fleet, after retiring their thirteen Airbus A330 aircraft.

In December 2021, Air France-KLM ordered 100 Airbus A320neo family aircraft to replace KLM and Transavia's Boeing 737 Next Generation.

The Air France-KLM Group confirmed firm orders for the Airbus A350F in two stages: initially for Air France, with a firm order placed on 12 April 2022 (following a Dec 2021 Letter of Intent) for 4 aircraft, and later for Martinair (KLM Cargo), with a firm order for 4 additional aircraft announced on 27 January 2023, however in March 2025, the group reduced its commitment from eight to six amid the delayed freighter's entry into service.

On 25 September 2023, Air France-KLM announced that they had signed an agreement with Airbus for a total of 50 Airbus A350-900 and A350-1000 aircraft, with an option for 40 more. The type is set to serve intercontinental flights from 2026, replacing its fleet of Boeing 777-200ER, Airbus A330-200 and Airbus A330-300 aircraft.

In August 2025, the group converted eight of the 11 -1000 orders to the -900 variant for better flexibility across the group.

In October 2026, KLM announced that it would reduce the number of A320neo family aircraft planned for delivery by 20, effectively abandoning its plans to take on the A320neo entirely. Instead, 20 additional Embrear E195-E2 aircraft will be added to the KLM Cityhopper fleet . The 20 A320neo family aircraft that KLM will no longer take up will be allocated to other airlines within the Air France-KLM group .

=== Special liveries ===
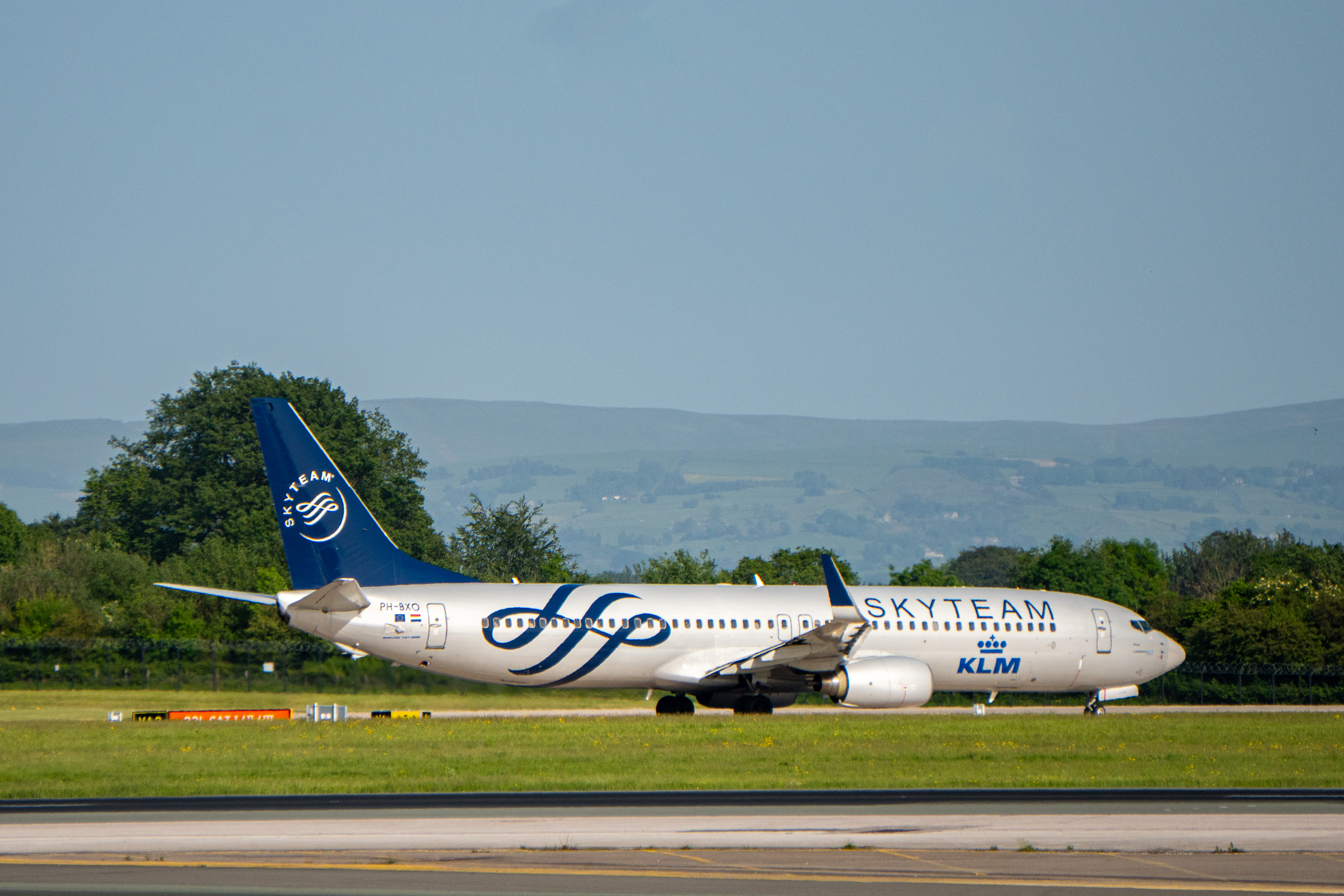
SkyTeam livery

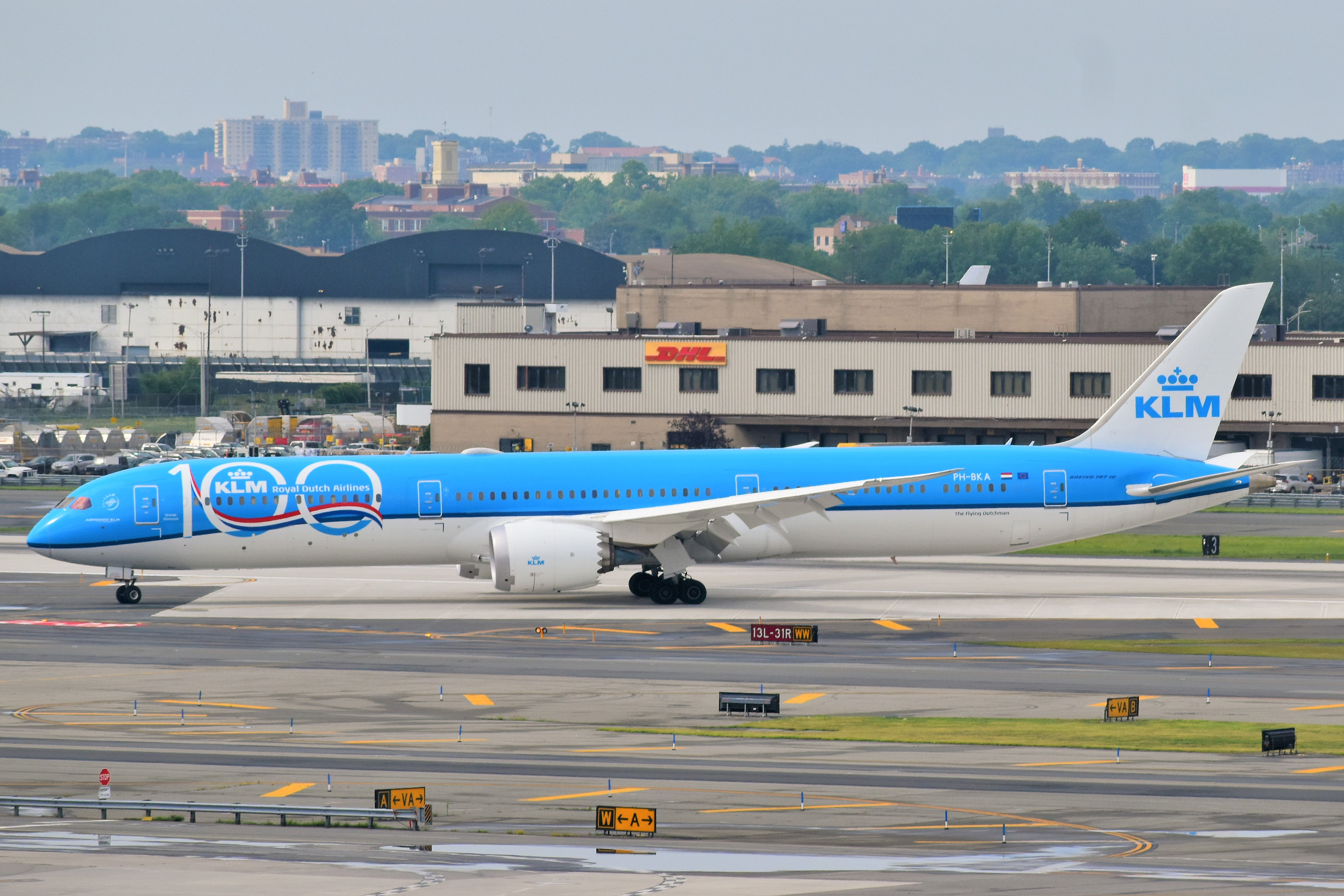
Centennial livery

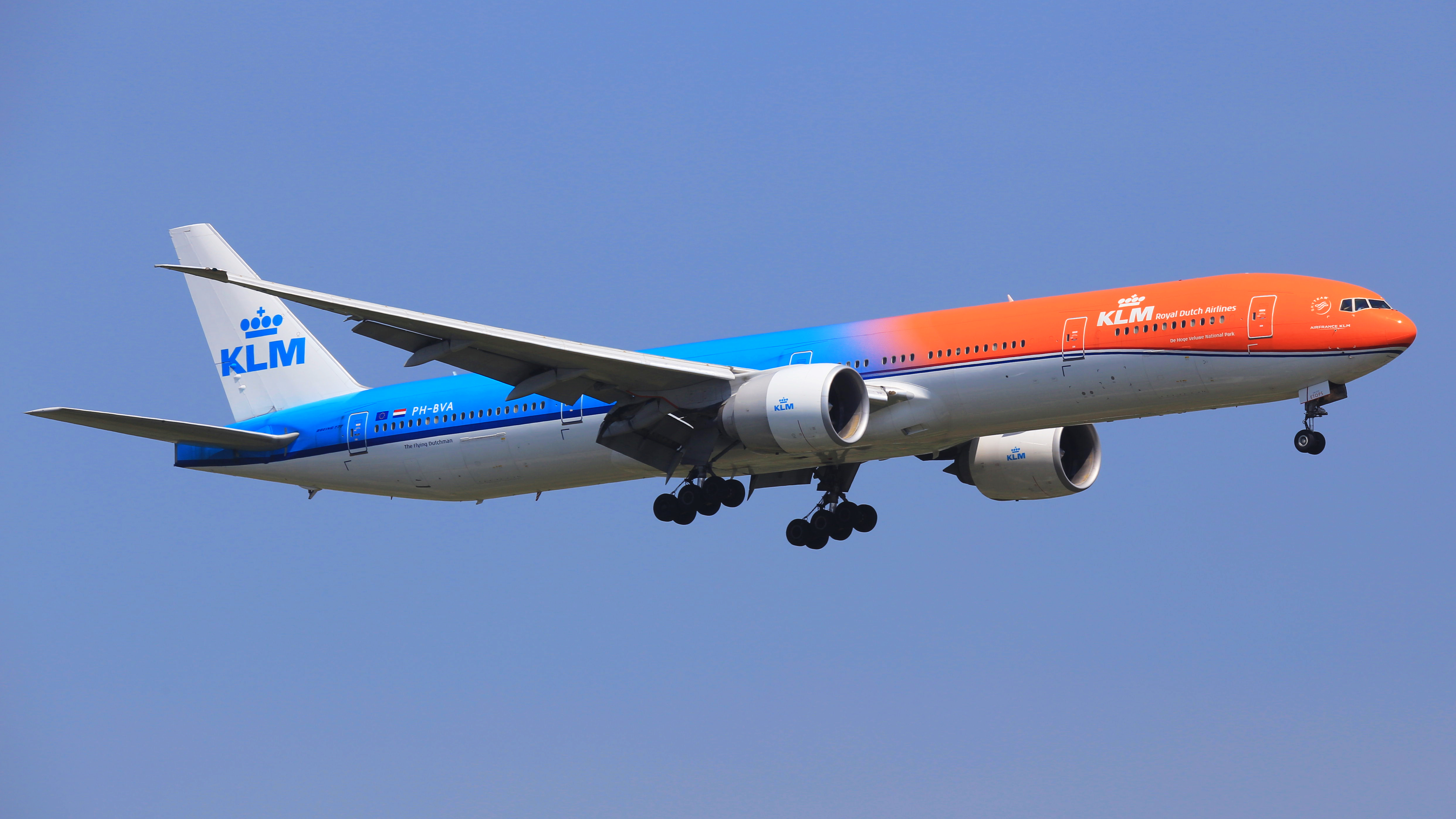
"Orange Pride" livery

KLM has several aircraft painted in special liveries; they include:

- PH-BVA, a Boeing 777-300ER, features an orange forward fuselage that fades into the standard blue to commemorate the Netherlands national team's participation in the 2016 Summer Olympics in Rio de Janeiro. On 20 November 2023, KLM launched a new version of this livery in which the fade was replaced by a Dutch flag.
- PH-KZU, a Fokker F70, had been applied with a special livery featuring Anthony Fokker before its phase-out, the founder of Fokker, commemorating the airline's long-standing history with Fokker aircraft and the phase-out of the Fokker 70 aircraft in October 2017.
- Several aircraft bear the silver SkyTeam alliance livery, including PH-BXO (a 737-900) and PH-EZX (a KLM Cityhopper ERJ-190).
- PH-BKA, KLM's first Boeing 787-10, features a special livery to commemorate the airline's 100 year anniversary.

== Cabin ==
KLM has three cabin classes for international long-haul routes; World Business Class, Premium Comfort and Economy. Part of the Economy cabin has a higher seat pitch and is sold as Economy Comfort. Personal screens with audio-video on-demand, satellite telephone, SMS, and e-mail services are available in all cabins on all long-haul aircraft. European short-haul and medium-haul flights have Economy seats in the rear cabin, and Economy Comfort and Europe Business in the forward cabin.

=== World Business Class ===
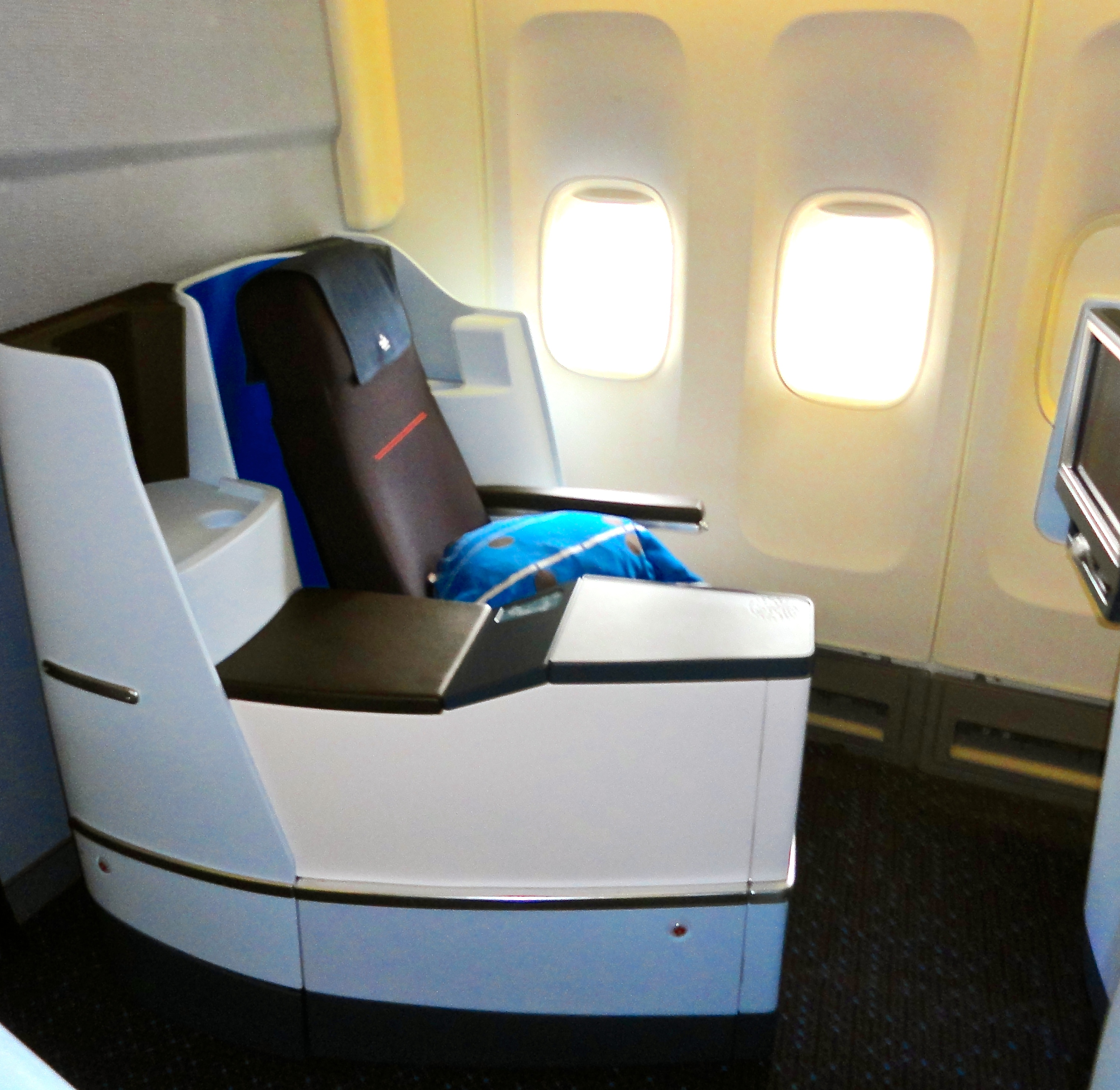
A World Business Class seat on board a former refurbished KLM Boeing 747-400

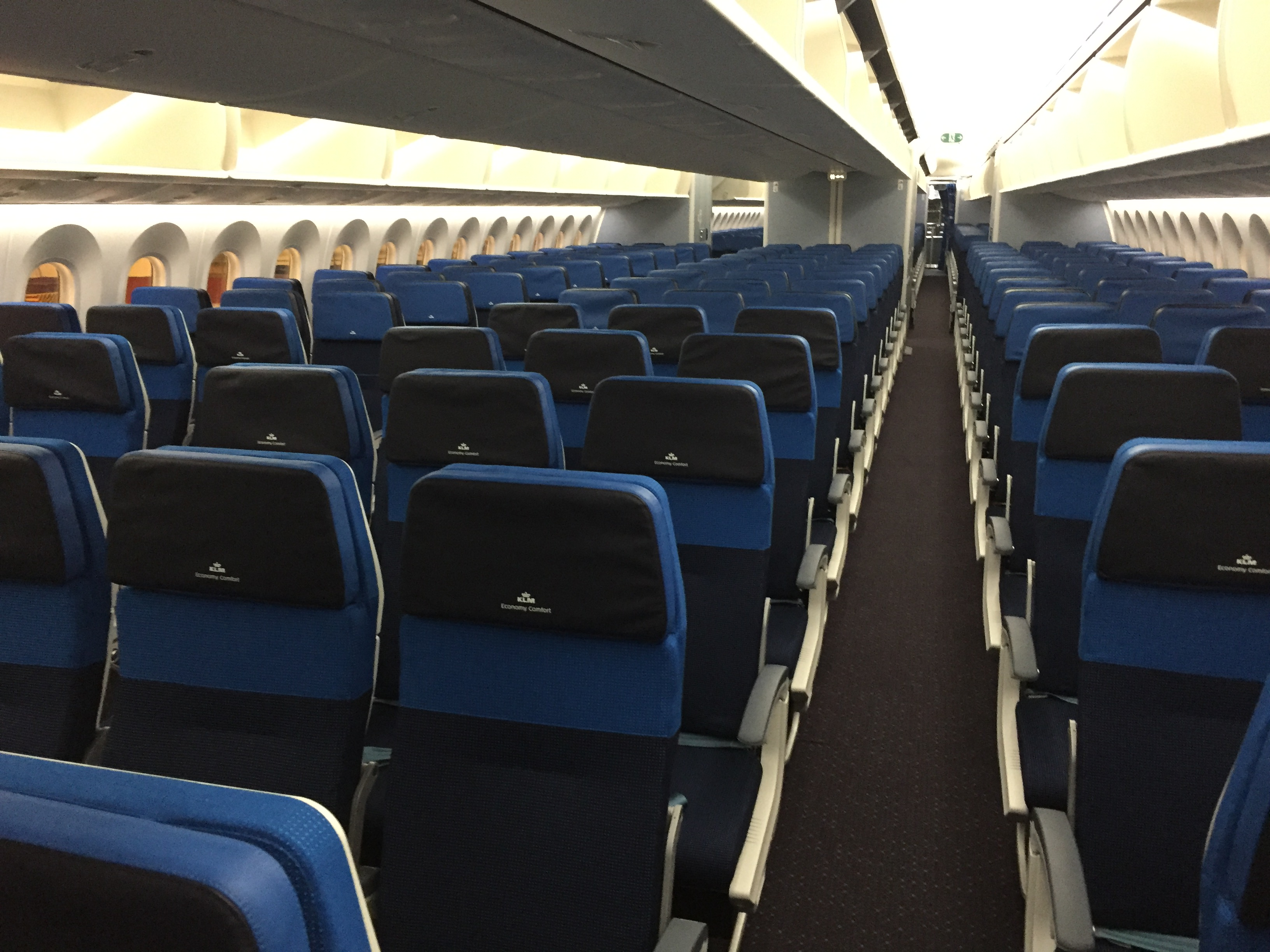
Economy Comfort and Economy Class seats on board a KLM Boeing 787-9 Dreamliner

World Business Class is KLM's long-haul business class product. Seats in the older World Business Class are 20 inches (51 cm) wide and have a 60-inch (150 cm) pitch. Seats can be reclined into a 170-degree angled flat bed with a length of 75 inches (190 cm). Seats are equipped with a 10.4-inch (26 cm) personal entertainment system with audio and video on demand in the armrest, privacy canopy, massage function and laptop power ports. World Business Class seating is in a 2–2–2 abreast arrangement on all Airbus A330s.

In March 2013, KLM introduced a new World Business Class seat to the long-haul fleet. Dutch designer Hella Jongerius designed the new cabin. The diamond-type seat is manufactured by B/E Aerospace and is currently installed on all Airbus A330s and Boeing 777s. The seats were also refurbished on former KLM Boeing 747-400s between 2013 and 2014. The new seats are fully flat and offer 17-inch (43 cm)-high definition personal entertainment systems. When fully flat, the bed is about 2 metres (6.6 ft) long. The cabin features a cradle-to-cradle carpet made from old uniforms woven in an intricate pattern, which is combined with new pillows and curtains with a similar design.

A completely new design of World Business Class seats was introduced with the launch of KLM's Boeing 787; this aircraft's business class seats are based on the Zodiac Cirrus platform used by Air France. The new seats lie fully flat, with a 1-2-1 layout so every passenger has direct aisle access, a large side-storage area and 16-inch (41 cm) HD video screen.

The tableware and cutlery for business class in-flight service was designed by Marcel Wanders. Dutch fashion stylists Viktor & Rolf designed amenity kits for World Business Class passengers. A new design will be introduced each year and the color of the kits will change every six months. The kit contains socks, an eye mask, a toothbrush, toothpaste, earplugs and Viktor & Rolf lip balm.

In 2022, KLM announced they would retrofit Boeing 777 aircraft in their fleet (notably, the 777-300 and 777-200) with seats in a 1-2-1 reverse herringbone configuration while installing Premium Comfort seats. These new seats will feature a "door" for extra privacy.

=== Europe Business Class ===
Europe Business Class is KLM's and KLM Cityhopper's short-haul business class. Europe Business Class seats are 17-inch (43 cm) wide and have an average pitch of 33 inches (84 cm). Middle seats in rows of three are blocked to increase passengers' personal space. Europe Business Class seats feature extra legroom and recline further than regular Economy Class seats. In-seat power is available on all Boeing 737 aircraft. Europe Business Class has no personal entertainment. Seating is arranged 3–3 abreast with the middle seat blocked on the Boeing 737 and Airbus A320neo family aircraft, and a 2–2 abreast arrangement on the Embraer E-Jet family and Embraer E-Jet E2 aircraft.

=== Premium Economy ===
In 2022, KLM announced they would retrofit their long-haul fleet to include Premium Comfort. Premium Comfort will be a new cabin in front of Economy Comfort, with between 21 and 28 new seats featuring a 13" touch screen, a movable leg- and footrest, 7.8 inches recline (20 cm) and up to 6.7 inches (17 cm) more pitch than Economy seats. Passengers in Premium Comfort can also enjoy improved food and beverage service, as well as SkyPriority benefits.

=== Economy Comfort ===
Economy Comfort is part of the economy class cabin offered on all KLM and KLM Cityhopper flights and provides passengers with more legroom and recline. Economy Comfort seats on long-haul flights have 4 inches (10 cm) more pitch than Economy Class, a 35–36-inch (89–91 cm) pitch and recline up to 7 inches (18 cm); double the recline of Economy. Economy Comfort seats on short-haul flights have 3.5 inches (8.9 cm) more pitch, totaling 33.5–34.5-inch (85–88 cm), and can recline up to 5 inches (13 cm) (40%) further. Except for the increased pitch and recline, seating and service in Economy Comfort is the same as in Economy Class. Economy Comfort is located in the front of the Economy Class; passengers can exit the aircraft before Economy passengers.

Economy Comfort seats can be reserved by Economy Class passengers. The service is free for passengers with a full-fare ticket, for Flying Blue Platinum members and Delta Air Lines SkyMiles Platinum or Diamond members. Discounts apply for Flying Blue Silver or Gold members, SkyTeam Elite Plus members and Delta SkyMiles members.

=== Economy Class ===
The Economy Class seats on long-haul flights have a 31-to-32-inch (79–81 cm) pitch and are 17.5 inches (44 cm) wide. All seats are equipped with adjustable winged headrests, a 9-inch (23 cm) PTV with AVOD, and a personal handset satellite telephone that can be used with a credit card. Economy Class seats in Airbus A330-300 aircraft are also equipped with in-seat power. The Economy Class seats on short-haul flights have a 30-to-31-inch (76–79 cm) pitch and are 17 inches (43 cm) wide. The Economy Class seats on short-haul flights do not feature any personal entertainment. The long-haul Economy Class seating is in a 3–4–3 abreast arrangement on the Boeing 747-400, Boeing 777-300ER aircraft and on Boeing 777-200ER aircraft, a 3-3-3 abreast arrangement on the Boeing 787-9 aircraft, and a 2–4–2 abreast arrangement on the Airbus A330 aircraft. The short-haul Economy Class seating is in a 3–3 abreast arrangement on the Boeing 737 aircraft and a 2–2 abreast arrangement on the Embraer E175 and E190 aircraft, and the seats on these aircraft are 17 inches (43 cm) wide.

== Services ==
=== In-flight entertainment ===
KLM's in-flight entertainment system is available in all classes on all widebody aircraft; it provides all passengers with Audio/Video on Demand (AVOD). The system includes interactive entertainment including movies, television programs, music, games, and language courses. About 80 movies including recent releases, classics and world cinema are available in several languages. The selection is changed every month. The in-flight entertainment system can be used to send SMS text messages and emails to the ground. Panasonic's 3000i system is installed on all Boeing 747-400, Boeing 777-200ER, and on most of the Airbus A330-200 aircraft. All Airbus A330-300 and Boeing 777-300ER aircraft, and some Airbus A330-200 aircraft are fitted with the Panasonic eX2 in-flight entertainment system.

KLM provides a selection of international newspapers to its passengers on long-haul flights; on short-haul flights, they are offered only to Europe Business Class passengers. A selection of international magazines is available for World Business Class passengers on long-haul flights. All passengers are provided with KLM's in-flight magazine, the Holland Herald. On board flights to China, South Korea and Japan, the airline offers in-flight magazines EuroSky (China and Japan), in either Chinese or Japanese, and Wings of Europe (South Korea) in Korean. On 29 May 2013, KLM and Air France launched a pilot scheme to test in-flight WiFi internet access. Each airline equipped one Boeing 777-300ER in its fleet with WiFi, which passengers can use with their WiFi-enabled devices. Wireless service was available after the aircraft reached 20,000 feet (6,100 m) in altitude.

=== Catering ===
World Business Class passengers are served a three-course meal. Each year KLM partners with a leading Dutch chef to develop the dishes that are served on board. Passengers in Europe Business Class are served either a cold meal, a hot main course, or a three-course meal depending on the duration of the flight. All chicken served in World and Europe Business Class meets the standards of the Dutch Beter Leven Keurmerk (Better Life Quality Mark). KLM partnered with Dutch designer Marcel Wanders to design the tableware of World and European Business Class.

Economy Class passengers on long-haul flights are served a hot meal and a snack, and a second hot meal or breakfast, depending on the duration of the flight. On short-haul flights, passengers are served sandwiches or a choice of sweet or savoury snack, depending on the duration and time of the day. If the flight is at least two hours long, "stroopwafel" cookies are served before the descent. Most alcoholic beverages are free-of-charge for all passengers. After a successful trial period, KLM introduced à la carte meals in Economy Class on 14 September 2011; Dutch, Japanese, Italian, cold delicacies, and Indonesian meals are offered.

Special meals, including children's, vegetarian, medical, and religious meals, can be requested in each class up to 24 or 36 hours before departure. On flights to India, China, South Korea, and Japan, KLM offers authentic Asian meals in all classes. Meals served on KLM flights departing from Amsterdam are provided by KLM Catering Services.

In September 2016, KLM launched the world's first in-flight draft beer under the partnership with Heineken. The new service made its premiere aboard a flight to Curaçao in the airline's World Business Class cabin.

=== Delft Blue houses ===
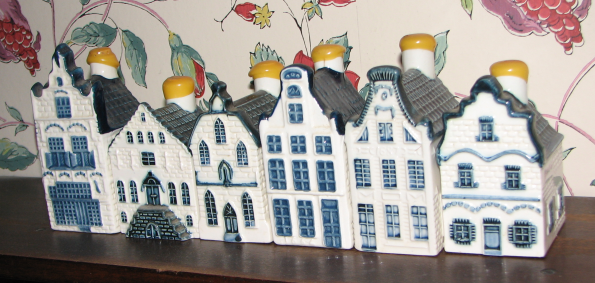
KLM Delft blue houses

Since 1952, KLM has presented its World Business Class passengers with a Delft blue miniature traditional Dutch house. These miniatures are reproductions of real Dutch houses and are filled with Dutch genever. Initially the houses were filled with Bols liqueur, which in 1986 was changed to Bols young genever.

In 1952, KLM started to give the houses to its First Class passengers. With the elimination of First Class in 1993, the houses were handed out to all Business Class passengers. The impetus for these houses was a rule aimed at curtailing a previously widespread practise of offering incentives to passengers by limiting the value of gifts given by airlines to US$0.75. KLM did not bill the Delft Blue houses as a gift but as a last drink free of charge, which was served in the house.

Every year, a new house is presented on 7 October, the anniversary of KLM's founding in 1919. The number on the last-presented house thus represents the number of years KLM has been in operation. The houses are a popular collectible for flyers. Special edition houses—the Royal Palace of Amsterdam and the 17th century Cheese Weighing House De Waag in Gouda—are offered to special guests, such as VIPs and honeymoon couples and are especially popular.

In 2026, the airline held a pop-up exhibit at the New York Historical celebrate 80 years of connecting New York City and created a limited edition commemorative house.

=== Ground services ===
KLM offers various check-in methods to its passengers, who can check in for their flights at self-service check-in kiosks at the airport, via the Internet, or a mobile telephone or tablet. At destinations where these facilities are not available, check-in is by an airline representative at the counter. Electronic boarding passes can be received on a mobile device while boarding passes can be printed at airport kiosks.

Since 4 July 2008, KLM, in cooperation with Amsterdam Airport Schiphol, has been offering self-service baggage drop-off to its passengers. The project started with a trial that included one drop-off point. The number of these points has gradually increased; as of 8 February 2012 there are 12 of them. KLM passengers can now drop off their bags themselves. Before they are allowed to do that they are being checked by a KLM employee.

In November 2012, KLM started a pilot scheme at Amsterdam Airport Schiphol to test self-service boarding. Passengers boarded the aircraft without any interference of a gate agent by scanning their boarding passes, which opened a gate. KLM partner airline Air France ran the same pilot at its hub at Paris-Charles de Gaulle Airport. The pilot ran until March 2013, which was followed by an evaluation.

KLM is the first airline to offer self-service transfer kiosks on its European and intercontinental routes for passengers connecting through Amsterdam Airport Schiphol. The kiosks enable connecting passengers to view flight details of connecting flights, to change seat assignments or upgrade to a more comfortable seat. When a passenger misses a connecting flight, details about alternative flights can be viewed on the kiosk and a new boarding pass can be printed. Passengers who are entitled to coupons for a beverage, meal, the use of a telephone, or a travel discount can have these printed at the kiosk.

=== Flying Blue ===
Air France-KLM's frequent flyer program, Flying Blue, awards miles based on the distance travelled, ticket fare and class of service. As well as KLM and Air France, other airlines that adopted the Flying Blue programme include Transavia, Aircalin, Winair and TAROM. Membership in the program is free. When flying, members earn Experience Points (XP) and Award Miles.

Experience Points are used to determine membership level and remain valid until the end of the qualification period, which lasts for 1 year from counting from the member's first flight. XP can be earned with KLM, Air France, Transavia, Aircalin, TAROM, and other SkyTeam partners. The Flying Blue programme is divided into four tiers: Explorer, Silver (SkyTeam Elite), Gold (SkyTeam Elite Plus) and Platinum (SkyTeam Elite Plus). The membership tier depends on the number of Experience Points earned and is recalculated each qualification period. Flying Blue privileges are additive by membership tier; higher tiers include all benefits listed for prior tiers. There is an additional fifth tier, Platinum for Life, which can be obtained after 10 consecutive years of Platinum membership. After the Platinum for Life status is obtained, re-qualification is not required.

Award Miles can be exchanged for rewards and expire after 24 months of inactivity. Award Miles can be earned on flights with SkyTeam member airlines as well as on other Flying Blue partners including Air Corsica, Air Mauritius, airBaltic, Aircalin, Bangkok Airways, Chalair Aviation, China Southern Airlines, Copa Airlines, Gol Transportes Aéreos, Japan Airlines, Malaysia Airlines, Qantas, Transavia, Twin Jet, WestJet and Winair. Award Miles are redeemable for free tickets, upgrades to a more expensive seating class, extra baggage allowance, wifi on board, and lounge access. They can also be donated to various charities, or can be spent in the Flying Blue Store.

In June 2022, Brim Financial announced it will launch an Air France-KLM co-branded credit card in Canada.

In 2025, the program claims 30 million members, 40 affiliated airlines worldwide, and over a hundred Flying Blue Partners, including commercial partners such as Uber or SNCF, as well as Apple, Kodak, Kolet, Panasonic, Philipp Plein, Aelia Duty Free, Nextory, The Bicester Collection, Cinq Mondes, Ice-Watch... · .

== Sustainability ==
In 2022, parent company Air France-KLM published a report of emission reduction targets for 2030 that were approved by the Science Based Targets initiative to be in line with the Paris Agreement. This includes offering options for consumers to contribute to sustainability programs offered by the airline. On their website, KLM detail many sustainability initiatives, including use of sustainable aviation fuels, reforestation programs, and reducing the weight of on board items to save fuel.

A report by the Breda University of Applied Sciences stated that the measures set by KLM in the 2022 report will not achieve the targets set out. In 2024, it was ruled that 15 of 19 claims submitted by KLM, including being on their way to "a more sustainable future" were based on vague and general statements, and overexaggerated the potential effects of the measures put in place. These were deemed misleading and therefore unlawful, and has been described by activists as greenwashing.

Meanwhile, Air France-KLM have been heavily involved in lobbying against European climate policy, and have actively opposed measures such as a kerosine tax and a flight cap at Schiphol Airport.

=== Sustainable Aviation Fuels ===
The main measure mentioned by KLM in its emissions reduction programme is the addition of Sustainable Aviation Fuels (SAF) to jet fuel. KLM offers customers the option to pay extra to contribute to the SAF programme, stating that the fuel will be added to the system at Schipol. The report by Breda University stated that KLM's target for SAF share by 2030 was not realistic given the scarcity of the fuel and the expected global availability.

=== Compensation through reforestation ===
KLM offers customers the opportunity to offset their flight emissions by contributing to reforestation programs. They initially used the slogan “Be a hero, fly CO_{2} zero” to promote this. However in 2022, the Dutch agency RCC (Advertising Code Committee) indicated to KLM that this claim was not sufficiently substantiated and that it was wrong to state that it was possible to fly CO_{2} neutral.

== Accidents and incidents ==
=== Tenerife airport disaster ===
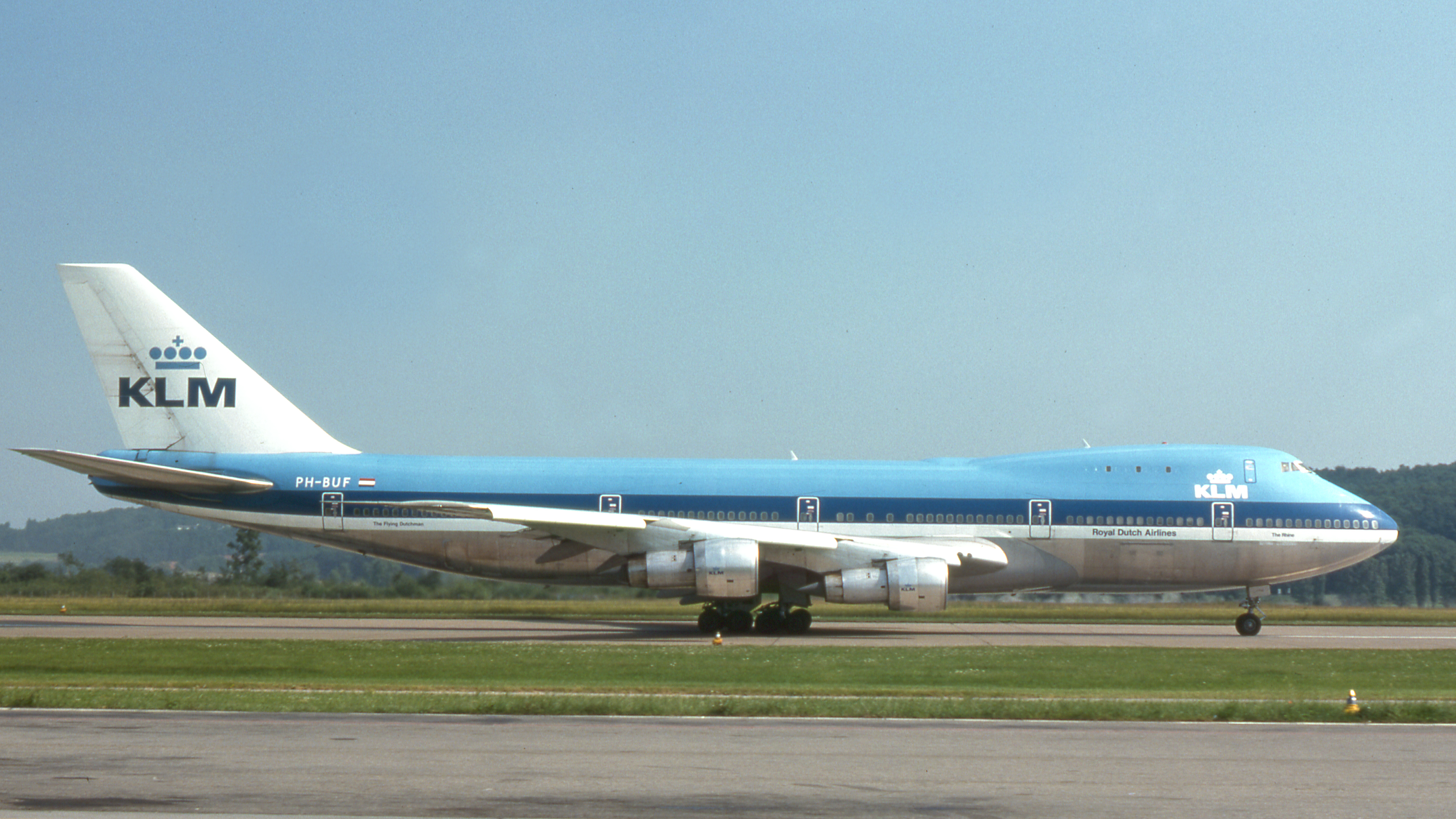
At the time of the accident, the Boeing 747 named Rhine registered as PH-BUF was only six years old.

The Tenerife disaster, which occurred on 27 March 1977, remains the accident with the largest number of airliner passenger fatalities, as well as the most recent fatal and notable incident involving a KLM aircraft. 583 people died when a KLM Boeing 747-200B attempted to take off without clearance and collided with a taxiing Pan Am Boeing 747-100 at Los Rodeos Airport on the Canary Island of Tenerife, Spain. No one on the KLM 747 survived (14 crew, 234 passengers were killed) while 61 of the 396 passengers and crew on the Pan Am aircraft survived. Pilot error from the KLM aircraft was the primary cause. Owing to a communication misunderstanding, the KLM captain thought he had clearance for takeoff. Another cause was dense fog, meaning the KLM flight crew was unable to see the Pan Am aircraft on the runway until immediately before the collision. The accident had a lasting influence on the industry, particularly in the area of communication. An increased emphasis was placed on using standardized phraseology in air traffic control (ATC) communication by both controllers and pilots alike, thereby reducing the chance for misunderstandings. As part of these changes, the word "takeoff" was removed from general usage, and is only spoken by ATC when clearing an aircraft to take off.

== Notable employees ==
- Jacob Veldhuyzen van Zanten, pilot; internationally known for causing the airport disaster in 1977 at Tenerife, Spain, largely due to his misunderstanding communication between his plane and the air traffic controller
- Ingrid de Caluwé
- Bob Hiensch, flight attendant
- Joop van Werkhoven
- Leo Visser, pilot
- Lisa Westerhof, pilot
- King Willem-Alexander, guest pilot; monarch

== See also ==
- Air transport in the Netherlands
- List of airports in the Netherlands
- List of companies of the Netherlands

== General bibliography ==
- Wigton, D.C. (1963). From Jenny to jet. Los Angeles (CA.): Floyd Clymer Publications.
- Allen, R. (1978). Pictorial history of KLM. Shepperton (Surrey): Ian Allan Ltd.
- van der Klaauw, B. (1990). KLM vliegtuigen (in Dutch). De Alk.
- Smit, G.I.; Wunderink, R.C.J.; Hoogland, I. (1994). The image of KLM. Wormer (Netherlands): Inmerc.

== Specific bibliography ==
- Taylor, H. A. & Alting, Peter (April–July 1980). "Fokker's 'Lucky Seven'". Air Enthusiast. No. 12. pp. 24–38. ISSN 0143-5450.
- West, Michael (Autumn 2011). "Airliners in Warpaint - Warbirds in Civvies: 5: KLM in World War 2". Air-Britain Archive. pp. 133–137. ISSN 0262-4923.
