= Medco =

Medco can refer to:

- Medco Health Solutions, a U.S. pharmacy benefits management company
- Medco Energi Internasional, an Indonesian energy company
- Medco Energi Mining Internasional (MEMI), a subsidiary of Medco Energi Internasional
