= Charterhouse Capital Partners =

British private equity investment firm

Charterhouse Capital Partners LLP
- Type: Limited liability partnership
- Industry: Private equity
- Founded: 1934
- Headquarters: London, England
- Products: Private equity funds, Leveraged buyouts
- Number of employees: 120
- Website: charterhouse.co.uk

Charterhouse Capital Partners is a London-based private equity investment firm focused on investing in European mid-market companies valued between €200m and €1.5bn. The company targets investments across the services, healthcare, specialised industrials and consumer sectors.

== History ==
Founded in 1934, Charterhouse Capital Partners is one of Europe's oldest private equity firms. The firm's predecessors, then a division of Charterhouse Bank, began raising third party equity in 1976. In June 2001, the firm's management completed a management buyout from HSBC to become an independent investment firm.

== Notable investment activity ==
In 2009, Charterhouse acquired Wood Mackenzie, selling its stake to Hellman & Friedman in 2012.

In 2010, the company acquired Deb Group, a skincare product group, and sold its stake in 2015 to SC Johnson, reportedly earning a return of over 2.5x.

In 2010, they acquired Card Factory, exiting its stake in 2015.

In 2011, the company acquired ERM, and in 2015, sold its stake to Omers in a deal valued at $1.7 billion.

In 2011, they acquired Webhelp, selling the company to KKR in 2015.

In 2013, Charterhouse acquired Doc Generici, an Italian pharmaceutical business, selling in 2016 to CVC Capital Partners.

In 2013, the company acquired Armacell in a €520 million deal and, in 2015, sold to a Blackstone led partnership in a deal valued at €960 million.

In 2015, Charterhouse acquired Mirion Technologies, a radiation detection provider, for $750 million, and in June 2021, Mirion announced it would go public after merging with a Goldman Sachs backed SPAC in a deal valued at $2.6 billion.

In 2016, the company acquired Cooper, a provider of generalist over-the-counter (OTC) self-care pharmaceuticals, and in March 2021 sold a majority stake to CVC.

In 2017, the company acquired a majority stake in SERB, a Brussels headquartered specialty pharmaceuticals company.

In 2018, they acquired a majority stake in Siaci Saint Honore (SSH), a B2B insurance broker, and sold in July 2021 to a consortium led by Burrus Group.

In March 2018, the company acquired SLR Consulting, a UK environmental consultancy previously owned by 3i, becoming a major shareholder.

In June 2019, Charterhouse disposed of Italian cheese maker and distributor Nuova Castelli, which had been in their possession since 2014, and which was acquired by the Lactalis Group Italia.

In December 2020, SERB pharmaceuticals, backed by Charterhouse Capital Partners, agreed to purchase Boston Scientific's BTG specialty pharma unit for $800m. In the same month, the company acquired Inflexion Private Equity's minority stake in the UK pension provider Lane Clark & Peacock.

Also in December 2020, Charterhouse concluded a deal with French banking group Crédit Mutuel Arkéa, for a stake in the Dutch software company Vermeg.

In June 2022, Charterhouse disposed of SLR Consulting to a private equity fund managed by Ares Management.

In July 2022, Amtivo Group, a provider of certification and related services, known globally as Amtivo, was acquired by Charterhouse Capital Partners from August Equity. As part of the transaction, August Equity reinvested a portion of the proceeds to maintain a minority stake in the company. Since its founding in 2017, Amtivo Group has acquired over 20 companies, some of which include British Assessment Bureau, UK Food Certification, Orion Registrar, Certification Europe, and EUCI.

In March 2023, in a cash and shares deal, Charterhouse sold the Irish Tarsus Group to Informa for a reported GBP 790m.

In April 2023, the company's sale of French telecom's Sagemcom to a continuation fund backed by AlpInvest Partners was officially recorded. In the same month, Charterhouse confirmed their investment in a management buyout of France Valley Investissements, the €4 billion forestry and real assets manager, together with Guillaume Toussaint and Arno Filhol and their management team, to support France Valley's intended launch of ESG-linked products.
