= Audley Travel =

Travel and holiday companies of the United Kingdom

Audley Travel Group Limited
- Formerly: Asian Journeys
- Type: Private
- Industry: Tour operator activities
- Founded: 25 April 1996; 30 years ago in Northampton, Northamptonshire, United Kingdom
- Founder: Craig Burkinshaw; John Brewer
- Headquarters: New Mill, New Mill Lane, Witney, United Kingdom
- Number of locations: 3 (2022)
- Area served: UK; United States; Canada
- Key people: Nick Longman (CEO); Richard Prosser (Chairman); David Philips (CFO); Mark Hanson (MD for UK and Ireland); Sonal Patel (General Council and CSO)
- Revenue: £216,000,000 (2018)
- Total assets: £59,753,000 (2018)
- Owner: 3i
- Number of employees: 762 (2023)
- Website: audleytravel.com

Audley Travel is a tour operator based in the UK in Witney, Oxfordshire, with offices in London and Boston. The company covers over 90 destinations worldwide, providing tailor-made travel. According to the Financial Times, Audley is the largest operator in this market.

== History ==
Audley Travel was founded in a Northampton post office in 1996 by Craig Burkinshaw and John Brewer, both graduates of the London School of Economics. The pair originally offered tours of Vietnam, advertising in The Sunday Times.

In 2006, the company moved to its current headquarters at New Mill in Witney, Oxfordshire, and tourism executive Ian Simkins joined the company as CEO in 2011.

In 2014, the company opened an office in London and a US office in Boston, Massachusetts after it discovered 20% of its web traffic was coming from the United States.

Audley arranges holidays in more than 90 destinations, covering all seven continents. Top-selling destinations include the USA, Canada, Japan, South Africa, India, Australia, New Zealand, Thailand, Vietnam and Costa Rica.

In 2012, equity firm Equistone Partners Europe invested a majority stake in Audley Travel during a management buyout. Equistone exited its investment in 2015, selling its share of the company to private equity firm 3i.

== Philanthropy ==
In January 2020, Audley was granted Travelife Partner status in recognition of its efforts to improve sustainability and corporate social responsibility. Travelife is the leading international sustainability certification in the travel sector.

In 2021, Audley introduced an Environmental, Social and Corporate Governance (ESG) framework that identifies five areas they will focus on each year. These goals are often aligned to the UN Sustainable Development Goals.

The company created the Audley Travel for Good Fund to support several social and environmental charities around the world that align with its responsible travel approach. As of 2022, the company supports seven UN Sustainable Development Goals focused on supporting the communities and ecosystems clients and staff travel to.
