= Ophir Energy =

Former British oil and gas company

Ophir Energy plc
- Company type: Public limited company
- Traded as: LSE: OPHR
- Industry: Oil and gas
- Founded: 2004
- Headquarters: London, England
- Key people: Nicholas Smith (Chairman); Nicholas Cooper (Chief Executive Officer)
- Products: Petroleum
- Revenue: US$161.1 million (2015)
- Operating income: US$368.8 million (2015)
- Net income: US$322.5 million (2015)

Ophir Energy plc was an oil and gas exploration and production company based in London. It owned both operating and non-operating assets in Africa, Asia, and Mexico.

== History ==
The company was founded by Alan Stein and Jonathan Taylor in 2004 with backing from Tokyo Sexwale. It was listed on the London Stock Exchange in July 2011. In March 2014, Ophir Energy sold its 20% stake in its Tanzanian assets for around $1.2 billion to Pavilion Energy.

On 2 March 2015 Ophir Energy purchased Salamander Energy.

In 2017, the company conducted massive layoffs with addition to restructure the organization due to harsh market conditions.

In 2018, Ophir agreed to acquire a package of Southeast Asian assets from Santos for $205 million. The portfolio of assets included producing assets in Vietnam and Indonesia together with exploration assets in Malaysia and Bangladesh. The transaction was in line with Ophir's stated strategy of rebalancing its portfolio towards a larger production and cash flow base to support the refocused exploration portfolio.

In January 2019, was denied a licence extension on the Fortuna Floating Liquified Natural Gas project in Equatorial Guinea, the first of its kind in Africa, which was due to produce its first gas in 2020.

In May 2019, Ophir was acquired by MedcoEnergi in a deal valued at £408.4 million ($517.6 million). This step further reflected Ophir's previous objective to be more focused on Asian Producing Assets as well as minimizing exposure to high risk exploration portfolios. The acquisition has made the expanded company one of the largest independent E&P company in South East Asia.

== Operations ==
In Tanzania, the company participated in the planned LNG project together with Tanzanian Government through the Tanzania Petroleum Development Corporation and BG Group.
