= SLR Consulting =

International environmental consultancy

SLR Consulting Ltd
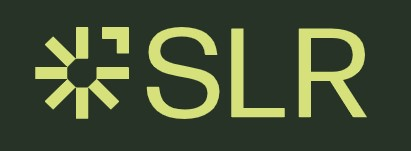
- Type: Private limited company
- Industry: Sustainability consulting
- Founded: 1994
- Headquarters: Buckinghamshire, United Kingdom
- Revenue: £99.7 million (2025)
- Owner: Ares Management
- Number of employees: Over 5,000
- Website: slrconsulting.com

SLR Consulting is a privately owned international sustainability consultancy with offices in Europe, North America, South America, Australasia, and Africa. In 2025, it reported revenues of £99.7 million. It states its purpose is ‘Making Sustainability Happen’, which it achieves through its global team of advisors and technicians, who partner with clients to tackle sustainability challenges.

The company operates more than 140 offices and employs over 5,000 staff across six continents. Its ultimate owner is Ares Management.

== History ==
SLR was originally founded in 1994 in the United Kingdom under the name SECOR Ltd. The company rebranded to SLR in 2000 and began expanding internationally, including the start of operations in the United States that same year. By 2007, SLR had surpassed £30 million in turnover and grown to more than 250 employees.

Throughout the 2010s and 2020s, SLR continued to expand geographically and through acquisitions. Operations were launched in Australia (2010), South Africa and Namibia (2011), New Zealand and France (2014), and Ghana (2020). The company also acquired numerous businesses across fields such as environmental management, ESG advisory, engineering, climate modelling, and corporate sustainability. Notable acquisitions include MMI, RPA, 360 Environmental, Vectos, Corporate Citizenship, Clearlead, ClimSystems, Finch & Beak, OPEN, RCS Global, and WRM.

In 2022, private equity firm Ares Management became SLR’s principal investor. By 2023, the company reported a staff level of more than 3,000 and continued growth through additional acquisitions, including Carnstone, IBIS Consulting, and Palmer. By 2026, employee count was over 5,000, owed to organic hiring and further acquisitions such as Wardell Armstrong, ITPEnergised, Malk Partners, SGA and Geobiota.

=== Founding ===
The firm was founded as SECOR Ltd in 1994 by John Leeson, Alan Sheppard, and David Richards. After establishing the company in Oxford, United Kingdom, in 1994, David oversaw the growth of the business from a small UK operator into an environmental consultancy in the UK, with international operations across Africa, Australasia, Canada, Europe, and the US.

In 2000, the senior management team completed a management buyout and the company's name was changed to SLR Consulting Limited. In 2004 they secured funding from Livingbridge, who invested £4.85 million as part of a £13 million investment including other partners, and took a significant minority stake in the company. In 2008, 3i invested £32.5 million in the firm, and replaced Livingbridge with a significant minority stake. In March 2018, Charterhouse Capital Partners (CCP) acquired a majority shareholding in the business. In June 2022 Charterhouse Capital Partners agreed to a sale of SLR Consulting to Ares Management private equity partners.

David Richards was Chief Executive Officer from 1994–2013. In line with the Group's succession plans, Neil Penhall, formerly Managing Director of SLR Consulting and an Executive Director of SLR Management, assumed the role of CEO.

In 2023, SLR announced the appointment of Bradley Andrews as the Company’s Chief Executive Officer. As part of a succession plan, Neil Penhall, SLR’s Chief Executive Officer of 10 years, remained with the business, moving to the role of Vice Chair of the SLR Board of Directors.

Bradley Andrews joined SLR from Worley, a leading global provider of professional services in the energy, chemicals and resources sectors, where he held several executive strategy and operational roles in the company across multiple geographic, industrial and service lines.

== Operations ==
=== Growth and Acquisitions ===
SLR has pursued a long‑term strategy of expanding its global footprint through organic growth and the integration of like‑minded consultancies. Key phases include:

- Expansion into North America, Australasia, Africa, and Europe (2000–2014).
- Significant acquisition activity beginning in 2019 involving multiple technical, climate, ESG, and advisory firms.
- Continued acquisitions in 2020–2026 including sustainability, engineering, supply‑chain, and climate‑modelling specialists.

=== Expansion ===
Over the years the firm has expanded its offices, with additions across Europe (including the UK & Ireland, France, Germany, and the Netherlands), Africa (including Ghana, Namibia and South Africa), Asia-Pacific (including Australia, New Zealand and Singapore), and the US, Canada, & Chile in the Americas. By 2023 there were more than 100 offices across 15 countries, with over 3,000 staff. Over the last three years, the firm has continued to expand its global reach through organic growth and acquisitions. As of 2026, SLR Consulting has more than 140 offices and over 5,000 staff globally.

SLR has made a number of acquisitions of recent years, beginning with the UK-based Waste Management Engineering Limited in 2005. Then followed the UK-based landscape architect company Insite Environments; the Canadian company SEACOR Environmental Inc. the UK-based company FMH Consulting Engineers; the Irish Dublin-based environmental consultancy CSA; the specialist mineral planning, landscape and land management firm Bowman Planton; the UK based Architecture and Planning Solutions Alaska-based Hoefler Consulting Group; Australia-based Heggies Pty Limited; UK-based company Andrew McCarthy Associates; South African based GreenEng and Metago. In Namibia it acquired Bittner Water Consult CC, a sustainable groundwater consulting firm, and A Speiser Environmental Consultants, a Namibian-based specialist consultancy with expertise in EIAs.

In October 2013, Cooper Partnership - Chartered Landscape Architects was acquired in Bristol, UK; and in early 2014, the acquisition of HFP Acoustical was completed, adding offices in Calgary, Alberta and Houston, Texas. In July 2014 South African-based consultancy CCA Environmental Pty (Ltd) was also acquired. In November 2014 SLR acquired the UK-based oil and gas solutions provider Challenge Energy, and in February 2015 SLR acquired E.Vironment LLC, a Houston-based environmental management, health and safety, process safety, and transaction advisory firm. In April 2019, SLR acquired Novus Environmental, a Canadian specialized environmental firm.

Between 2019 and 2024, SLR Consulting continued its expansion with a number of acquisitions aimed at increasing its service offering across areas including ESG, climate advisory and engineering. In 2019, the firm acquired both MMI and RPA Inc., adding more than 300 staff to the global team. From 2020 through to 2022, SLR Consulting acquired KDC, 360 Environmental, Vectos and Corporate Citizenship, as well as establishing operations in Ghana alongside expanding the firms offering in Germany and Latin America.

As a result of acquiring Carnstone, IBIS Consulting and Palmer in 2023, SLR surpassed 3,000 global employees. This continued in 2024 with the acquisition of FRC Environmental, ITPEnergised, Malk Partners, SGA and Wardell Armstrong.

=== Global Operations ===
SLR Consulting operates in 127 countries with over 140 offices and a global workforce exceeing 5,000 staff. the company delivers services across six major global regions including:

- Europe
- Africa
- Asia-Pacific
- Canada
- Latin America
- United States

SLR's global footprint includes offices hubs in major cities across these regions, supporting project delivery in sectors such as energy, infrastructure, mining, technology and government.

== Project and impact ==
=== Notable projects ===
SLR works across a number of different areas including sustainability, environmental, energy transition and community impact. Notable project examples that have been highlighted by the company include:

- Climate resilience and sustainable supply-chain analysis for international industrial clients
- Advisory support for global organisations and government-backed climate adaptation programmes
- Decarbonisation and circularity initiatives in the chemicals and energy sectors

=== Recognition and certifications ===
SLR is certified to ISO 9001:2015 across regions including Africa, APAC, Canada, Europe, and the US. Parts of the European region are certified to ISO 14001:2015 and ISO 45001:2018.

The company publishes annual sustainability reports and has committed to Science Based Targets Initiative (SBTi)-aligned reductions in emissions, including Scope 1, 2, and 3 targets.

The 2024 edition of the Green Quadrant: ESG & Sustainability Services report by independent research firm Verdantix, ranks SLR Consulting in the Leader Quadrant.
