= Vermeg =

Financial software company with headquarters in Amsterdam

VERMEG

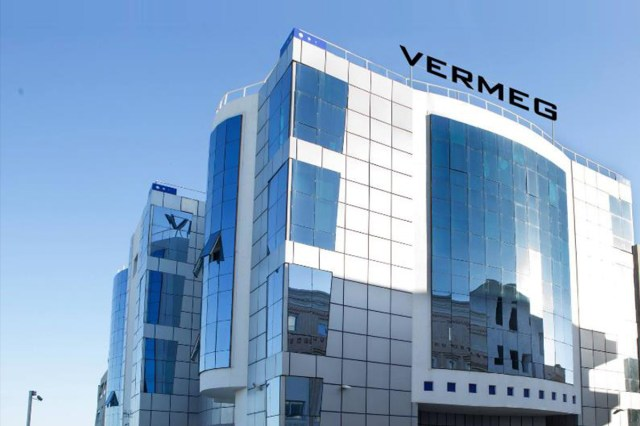
- Type: Private
- Industry: FinTech; Financial technology
- Founded: 1993
- Headquarters: Amsterdam, Netherlands
- Products: COLLINE, AGILE Reporter, MEGARA, SOLIFE, MASSAI, SOLIAM and Palmyra

VERMEG is an international software group operating across several lines of B2B services: pensions & insurance, wealth & asset management, financial & security markets and Digital Financial Services. The company develops software used across the private banking sector, consumer finance, asset management companies, central banks, insurance and other financial services providers covering insurance policy administration, asset portfolio management, regulatory reporting, collateral management, post-trade processing, low code application development, business process management and risk management.

The company was formed in 1993 by Badreddine Ouali and has headquarters in Amsterdam.

== History ==
VERMEG was founded in 1993 in Tunisia, initially under the name of BFI and was spun off from BFI in 2002. Its headquarters are now in Amsterdam and it has offices globally, including North America, Latin America, France, Belgium, Luxembourg, the UK, Singapore and Tunisia.

In 2017, Crédit Mutuel Arkéa acquired a 19.5% stake in VERMEG.

In December 2020, the private equity firm Charterhouse Capital Partners invested in Vermeg by buying part of the shares held by Crédit Mutuel Arkéa. In November 2026, the American investment firm Advent International signed an agreement to acquire Vermeg. The deal covered the stakes held by Charterhouse and by the founder, Badreddine Ouali, with the Abu Dhabi Investment Authority as a minority investor. Ouali was to keep a stake in the company and become its vice-chairman. Completion was expected in the first half of 2027, subject to regulatory approval.

== Acquisition ==
VERMEG has expanded both organically and via strategic acquisitions over the years:

- In 2011, the firm acquired the regulatory reporting business of Sofgen. The main part of the business acquired, which in the past was known in the US regulatory market as IDOM USA, is the United States and Canada regulatory reporting product REG-Reporter
- In 2014, VERMEG acquired the Belgium-based firm BSB, which specialized in financial software for insurance and private banking.
- In 2018, the firm acquired Lombard Risk, an international provider of software for risk management, regulatory reporting and collateral management

== Products ==
VERMEG provides across several financial sectors including asset management, central banking, retail banking, consumer finance, investment banking, regulatory reporting, pensions and insurance with over 400 clients worldwide.

Among VERMEGs Solutions are:

- MEGARA: Asset management and collateral management for central banks.
- COLLINE: Collateral management
- AGILE Reporter: Regulatory reporting
- SOLIFE: Life insurance policy contract management administration system.
- SOLIAM: Wealth management and private banking portfolio administration system.
- MASSAI: "Non-Life" insurance; containing the following modules: product, policy, claim and accounting.

VERMEG also offers a low code application development platforms:

- Veggo: Open architecture low code application development platform.
- Magikforms: No code, drag and drop form builder for insurance and banking.
