= Cygnific B.V. =

Business services company

Cygnific B.V., a pan-European service provider, is a subsidiary of KLM Royal Dutch Airlines that was founded in 1998. Cygnific is based in Amsterdam but also has a service centre in Enschede. About 700 employees assist customers and travel agents in a variety of countries and languages. By carrying out reservations, providing general information and supporting the KLM website Cygnific handles every year approximately 3 million transactions.
