= MedcoEnergi =

Indonesian oil and gas company

PT Medco Energi Internasional Tbk

- The Energy Tower in Jakarta, where the headquarters of MedcoEnergi is located
- Type: Public
- Traded as: IDX: MEDC
- Industry: Oil and gas, Power Generation, Coal Mining, Gas Pipeline, Drilling Services
- Founded: 9 June 1980; 46 years ago
- Headquarters: Jakarta, Indonesia
- Key people: Hilmi Panigoro, President Director; Ronald Gunawan, CEO
- Products: Crude Oil, Natural Gas, Electricity, Gold, Copper
- Revenue: ▼US $ 2,25 billion (2023)
- Operating income: ▼US $ 660 million (2019)
- Net income: ▼US $ 330,67 million (2023)
- Total assets: ▲US$ 7,46 billion (2023)
- Total equity: ▲US$ 2,02 billion (2023)
- Owner: PT Medco Daya Abadi Lestari (51.50%)
- Number of employees: 4,000 (2019)
- Website: www.medcoenergi.com

PT Medco Energi Internasional Tbk or MedcoEnergi is an Indonesian oil and gas company. The company operates in Trading and Holding & Related Operations, Exploration for and Production of Oil & Gas, Power, Services, Chemicals and Rental of properties.

== History ==
The company was founded by Indonesian businessman Arifin Panigoro in 1980 and is headquartered in Jakarta, Indonesia. In October 2015, the company bought an interest in the Singa gas field in the Lematang Block located in South Sumatra for $22 million and, in May 2019, the company acquired Ophir Energy in a deal valued at $517.6 million.

Also in 2015, the company acquired the Lundin Petroleum AB's Indonesian Oil & Gas asset for $22 million. In 2020, the company started producing gas from the Meliwis Field in East Java.

In December 2021, MedcoEnergi reached a deal with ConocoPhillips to acquire the assets of ConocoPhillips Indonesia Holding Ltd (CIHL). The acquisition was expected to be concluded in the first quarter of 2022.

== Overview of personnel ==
The group's current President Director is Hilmi Panigoro. Ronald Gunawan serves as the group's Director and CEO.

== See also ==
- List of petroleum companies
