= ERM (consultancy) =

Multinational consultancy focusing on sustainability

ERM Limited
- Type: UK private company limited by guarantee
- Industry: Professional services
- Founded: 1987; 39 years ago (through merger of UK-based ERL 1971 and USA-based ERM 1977)
- Headquarters: London, United Kingdom
- Area served: Worldwide
- Key people: Sabine Hoefnagel, Interim CEO
- Services: Environmental, health, safety, risk, social consulting services and sustainability related services
- Revenue: ▲US$1,323 million (2023)
- Owners: KKR & ERM partners
- Number of employees: 8,000 (2023)
- Website: www.erm.com

ERM (Environmental Resources Management) is a multinational consultancy firm which focuses on sustainability and the environment. It is headquartered in London, United Kingdom. The company provides environmental, health, safety, risk, and social consulting services and sustainability related services.

== History ==
ERM Limited was formed in 1987, through the merger of two companies: the UK-based consultancy firm ERL, which was founded in 1971; and the USA-based consultancy firm ERM, which was founded in 1977.

The company has since grown through various acquisitions.

During 2015, OMERS and AIMCo purchased a majority stake in ERM from Charterhouse Capital Partners. In May 2021, a majority stake in the company was purchased from OMERS and AIMCo by American global investment company KKR, valuing the company at around $2.7 billion including debt. A minority stake continues to be held by ERM partners.

== Projects ==
ERM prepared the environmental statement for High Speed 1, Britain's first dedicated modern high speed train line, during the 1990s. In the 2010s, a consortium led by ERM was awarded the environmental impact assessment work for part of the High Speed 2 programme. Other consortium members included Mott MacDonald and Temple Group.

The company has also performed environmental studies for international railway projects. In the 1990s, ERM was contracted to perform studies of multiple railway development proposals in Hong Kong. During the early 2010s, it worked on an air quality assessment for the prospective expansion of a South African manganese ore mining line at the behest of Transnet. Around the same time period, ERM assessed the environmental compliance of a major train station on behalf of Brisbane City Council, and a new rail corridor in Tanzania.

ERM has frequently worked in the mining and energy sectors. The company produced the impact assessment for the Keystone Pipeline; critics accused it of having a conflict of interest by means of affiliation with proponents of the scheme. During 2021, it performed an environmental impact assessment in Guyana for the American oil and gas corporation ExxonMobil; its work on the project became a controversial matter due to alleged errors. ERM also prepared the impact assessment for the Dakota Access Pipeline despite having an alleged conflict of interest in the scheme. It also certified that the Batoka Gorge Hydroelectric Power Station, on the international border between Zambia and Zimbabwe, did not pose serious adverse effects on human settlement along the Zambezi River. ERM performed the environmental and social impact assessment for exploratory drilling in São Tomé and Príncipe during the late 2010s.

In 2022, the company was amongst several parties that were sued by a group of Houston residents that alleged misrepresentation, fraudulent concealment, wrongful death, and personal injury claims related to environmental pollution.

In 2019, ERM received funding from the British government for Project Dolphyn, a project focused on green hydrogen production from offshore wind power.
