= Salamander Energy =

British-based oil and gas exploration and production business

Salamander Energy plc
- Company type: Public (LSE: SMDR)
- Industry: Energy
- Founded: 2005
- Headquarters: London, UK
- Key people: Charles Jamieson, Chairman; James Menzies, CEO
- Revenue: $368.0 million (2012)
- Operating income: $44.3 million (2012)
- Net income: $(62.3) million (2012)
- Parent: Ophir Energy
- Website: www.salamander-energy.com

Salamander Energy was a British-based oil and gas exploration and production business. Its activities were focused on South East Asia. It was headquartered in London and was listed on the London Stock Exchange until March 2015, when it was acquired by Ophir Energy. Following the completion of the acquisition, Salamander Energy was merged with its parent.

== History ==
The company was founded by James Menzies, Nick Cooper and Andrew Cochran in 2005. It was first listed on the London Stock Exchange in 2006. In 2008, the company acquired GFI Oil & Gas Corporation.

On March 2, 2015, Salamander Energy announced that its $492 million purchase by Ophir Energy has been finalized.

== Operations ==
The group was organised by country:

- Indonesia
- Thailand
- Laos
- Vietnam
