= TCR International =

Airport ground support equipment supplier company

- Company type: Private
- Founded: 1999; 26 years ago
- Headquarters: Brussels, Belgium
- Area served: Worldwide
- Key people: Tom Bellekens (CEO)
- Services: Airport Ground Support Equipment
- Website: www.tcr-group.com

TCR International is a ground support equipment (GSE) supplier company, headquartered in Brussels, Belgium. The company provides ground support equipment to ground handlers, airlines, airports and cargo handlers. Currently the company operates at approximately 200 airports worldwide.

TCR International started rental and maintenance activities in 1996. At present, the company provides a range of GSE services supporting handlers in their ground handling processes. The customer bases includes airlines, handling companies, airport, integrators and cargo handlers. The company is headquartered in Brussels. It has local offices in UK, France, Spain, the Netherlands, Norway, Ireland, Italy, Germany, Sweden, Denmark, Finland, USA, Malaysia Australia and New Zealand. The company employs 1300 people and rents 40,000 GSE.

In 2015, TCR started activities in Asia. Particularly it rents equipment in Malaysia and Japan. Activities in the United States started in 2008 and TCR Americas was also founded in 2015.

== Services ==
=== Rental ===
Around 40,000 GSE motorized or non-motorized are available for short or long term rental.

=== Maintenance and ramp services ===
Workshops of the company are located airside. Mobile workshops intervention are served in urgent conditions.
