= Frédéric Gagey =

French businessman (born 1956)

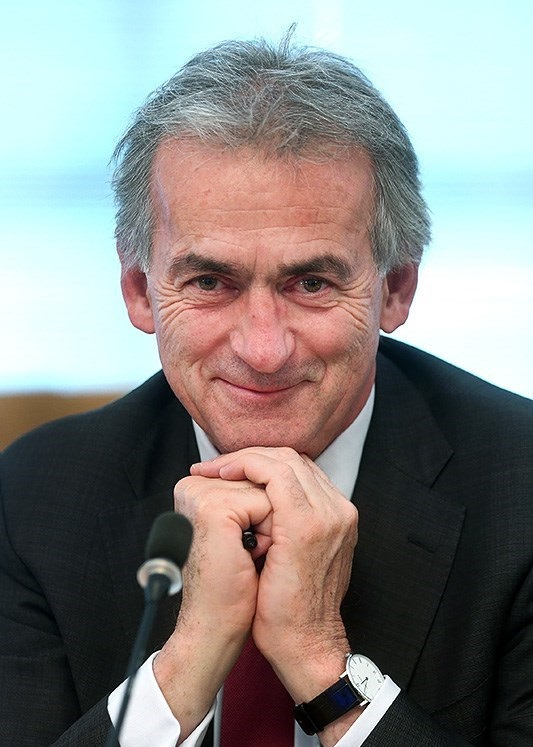
- Gagey during a conference in Tehran
- Born: 29 June 1956 (age 70); Vesoul, France
- Education: École Polytechnique; ENSAE ParisTech
- Occupation: CFO of Air France–KLM

Frédéric Gagey (born 29 June 1956) is a French businessman, the CFO of Air France–KLM.

Gagey is a graduate of the Ecole Polytechnique and the ENSAE School of Economics, Statistics and Finance. He also holds a master's degree in economics from the Université de Paris I.

His career started at the French Bureau of Statistics (INSEE) and in the Ministry of Finance. From September 1994 to April 1997, he held major positions at Air Inter. Following the merger between that airline and Air France in April 1997, Gagey was appointed Vice President for privatization and financial communication at Air France. He then assumed up the position of financial director in June 1999.

He joined KLM on January 1, 2005, before becoming Executive Vice President Financial Affairs. In 2012, he was appointed Chief Financial Officer at Air France.

In 2016, Gagey was appointed Executive Vice President Finance of the Air France–KLM group.

Business positions
Preceded by Alexandre de Juniac	CEO of Air France; 2013–2016	Succeeded by Jean-Marc Janaillac
