= Transavia Denmark =

Danish airline

IATA	ICAO	Call sign
PH	TDK	TDK
- Founded: 6 November 2008
- Commenced operations: 6 November 2008
- Ceased operations: 23 April 2011
- Operating bases: Copenhagen Airport
- Fleet size: 3 (at the time of closure)
- Destinations: 2 (at the time of closure)
- Parent company: Transavia
- Headquarters: Kastrup, Tårnby Municipality, Denmark
- Website: www.transavia.com

Transavia Denmark ApS, also known as Transavia.com Denmark or Transavia Denmark and trading as transavia.com, was a Danish based low-cost airline operating as a subsidiary of Transavia group. Its main base was at Copenhagen Airport. Transavia Denmark chiefly operated scheduled and charter services to leisure destinations. It was headquartered in Kastrup, Tårnby Municipality. Operations ceased in 2011, although those in the Netherlands and France continue.

== History ==
The airline began operations on 6 November 2008; Sterling Airlines had gone bankrupt in October 2008 and Transavia saw a good opportunity to start operations in Denmark because of this, and announced that it would start operations at short notice.

Transavia Denmark started flights from Billund Airport under a Danish tour operator. It operated five routes from Billund. It also announced a larger base at Copenhagen Airport from which it operated ten routes. Ticket sales for the new low-cost airline started on 7 November 2008.

In September 2010, it was announced that Transavia Denmark would cease operations on 23 April 2011. From 1 November 2010 onwards the activities were gradually scaled down until the complete stop on 23 April 2011. The parent of Transavia Denmark, Air France-KLM, stated that the Danish part of Transavia had not met expectations.

== Destinations ==
This is a list of airports to which Transavia Denmark flew (including seasonal destinations):

- Austria
  - Innsbruck - Innsbruck Airport
  - Salzburg - Salzburg Airport
- Denmark
  - Billund - Billund Airport
  - Copenhagen - Copenhagen Airport
- France
  - Montpellier - Montpellier - Méditerranée Airport
  - Nice - Côte d'Azur Airport
- Greece
  - Chania - Chania International Airport
- Italy
  - Naples - Naples Airport
  - Pisa - Galileo Galilei Airport
- Spain
  - Barcelona - Barcelona Airport
  - Las Palmas de Gran Canaria - Gran Canaria Airport
  - Málaga - Málaga Airport
  - Menorca - Menorca Airport
  - Palma de Mallorca - Son Sant Joan Airport
  - Tenerife - Reina Sofía Airport

== In-flight services ==
Transavia.com offered the "Assortment on Board" buy on board service offering food and drinks for purchase.

== See also ==
- Transavia
- Transavia France
