= Joon (airline) =

Airline of France (2017–2019)

IATA	ICAO	Call sign
JN	JON	JOON
- Founded: July 2017
- Commenced operations: 1 December 2017
- Ceased operations: 27 June 2019 (re-integrated into Air France)
- Hubs: Charles de Gaulle Airport
- Frequent-flyer program: Flying Blue
- Alliance: SkyTeam (affiliate)
- Parent company: Air France
- Headquarters: Paris, France
- Key people: Jean-Michel Mathieu (CEO)
- Website: www.flyjoon.com (defunct)

Joon S.A.S. was a French airline based at Charles de Gaulle Airport, north of Paris. Founded in 2017 as a subsidiary of Air France, the airline ceased operations on 27 June 2019, and was merged back into Air France.

== History ==
Joon was aimed at young people, according to its parent company Air France, with the word "Joon" sounding similar to the French word jeune, meaning young. It intended to serve destinations with heavy competition from low-cost carriers, reducing costs via lower-paid cabin crew. Joon commenced operations on 1 December 2017, serving short and medium-haul destinations within Europe, with initial routes to Barcelona, Berlin, Lisbon and Porto. Long-haul destinations in the Americas and Africa were added in Summer 2018.

In April 2018, it was announced that Joon had plans to operate 28 aircraft by 2020, consisting of 18 short to medium haul and 10 long haul aircraft. However, it was not specified whether the aircraft would be transferred from Air France or ordered solely for Joon. Some of the long haul aircraft Joon planned to operate were Airbus A350-900s.

On 29 November 2018, French newspaper Le Figaro reported that Air France-KLM's newly appointed CEO, Benjamin Smith, was considering dissolving Joon and reintegrating its operations into those of Air France, however no decision had been made by the board at the time. On 10 January 2019, Air France confirmed that it would reabsorb Joon's aircraft and staff by 26 June 2019.

== Destinations ==
Joon had operated to the following destinations to Europe, Middle East, Africa and South America as of 27 June 2019, with some destinations already discontinued by that date:

Country	City	Airport	Notes	Refs
Brazil	Fortaleza	Pinto Martins – Fortaleza International Airport	Terminated	
Czech Republic	Prague	Václav Havel Airport Prague		
Egypt	Cairo	Cairo International Airport		
France	Paris	Charles de Gaulle Airport	Hub	
Germany	Berlin	Berlin Tegel Airport		
Hungary	Budapest	Budapest Ferenc Liszt International Airport		
India	Mumbai	Chhatrapati Shivaji Maharaj International Airport	Terminated	
Iran	Tehran	Imam Khomeini International Airport	Terminated	
Italy	Rome	Rome Fiumicino Airport		
Mauritius	Port Louis	Sir Seewoosagur Ramgoolam International Airport	Terminated	
Norway	Bergen	Bergen Airport, Flesland	Terminated	
Norway	Oslo	Oslo Airport, Gardermoen		
Portugal	Lisbon	Lisbon Airport	Terminated	
Portugal	Porto	Porto Airport		
Sint Maarten	Philipsburg	Princess Juliana International Airport	Seasonal	
South Africa	Cape Town	Cape Town International Airport		
Spain	Barcelona	Josep Tarradellas Barcelona–El Prat Airport		
Spain	Madrid	Adolfo Suárez Madrid–Barajas Airport		
Sweden	Stockholm	Stockholm Arlanda Airport		
United Kingdom	Manchester	Manchester Airport	Terminated	

== Fleet ==
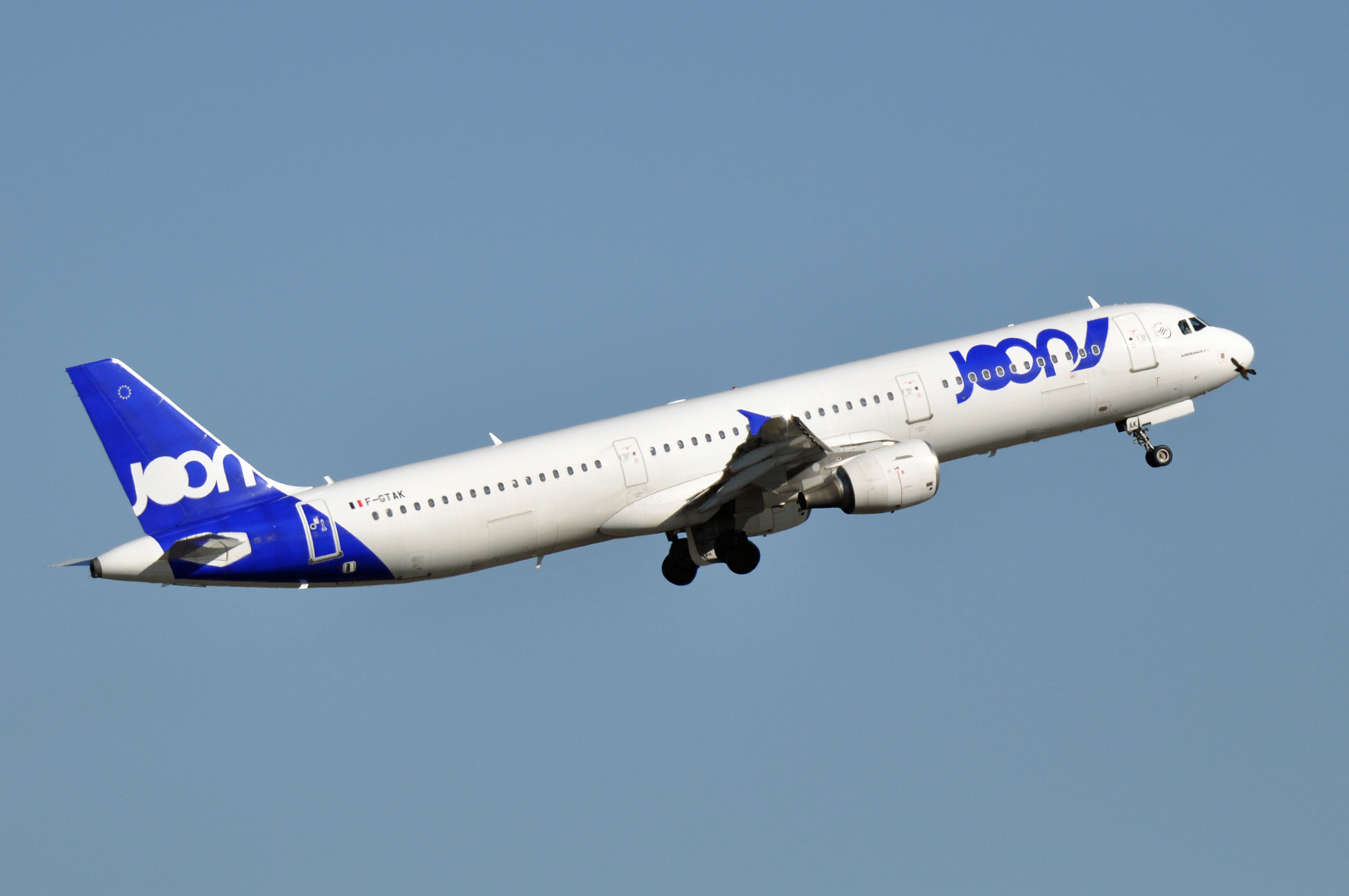
A former Joon Airbus A321-200

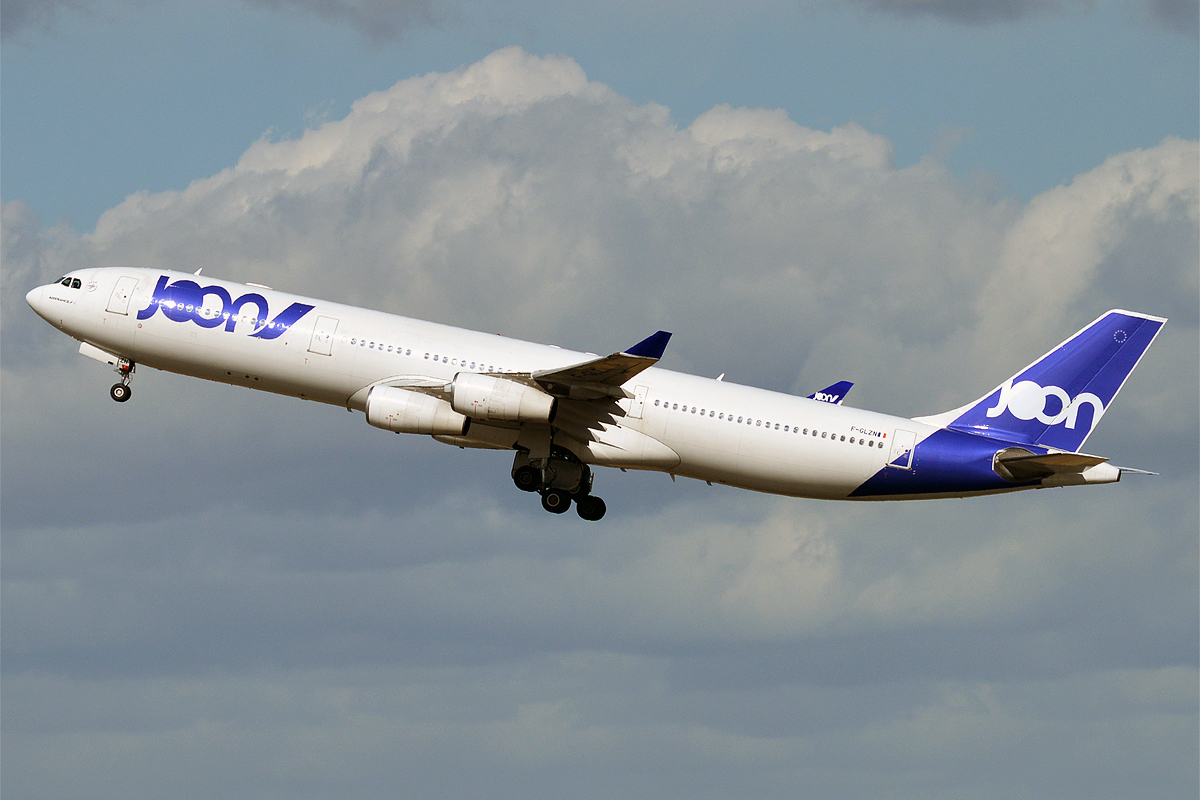
A former Joon Airbus A340-300

As of 27 June 2019, at the time of the airline's reintegration, Joon operated the following aircraft:

Joon Fleet
Aircraft	In Service	Orders	Passengers				Notes
Aircraft	In Service	Orders	C	W	Y	Total	Notes
Airbus A320-200	7	—	—	—	174	174	Transferred to Air France.
Airbus A321-200	4	—	16	—	188	204	Transferred to Air France.
Airbus A340-300	5	—	30	21	227	278	Transferred to Air France.
Total	16	—					

== See also ==
- List of defunct airlines of France
- Transport in France
