= Air Corsica =

French airline

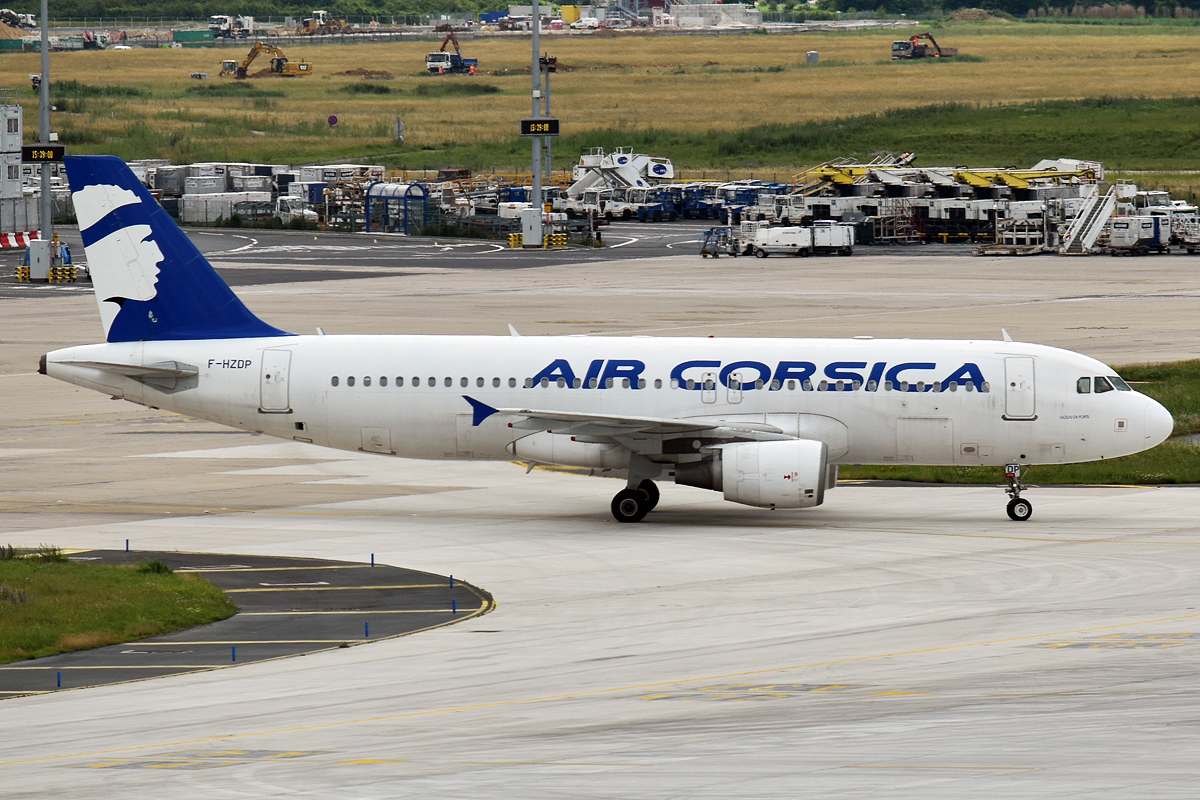
- Airbus A320-216
IATA	ICAO	Call sign
XK	CCM	CORSICA
- Founded: 6 January 1989
- Commenced operations: 1 July 1990
- Hubs: Ajaccio Napoleon Bonaparte Airport
- Secondary hubs: Bastia – Poretta Airport, Calvi – Sainte-Catherine Airport, Figari Sud-Corse Airport
- Frequent-flyer program: Flying Blue, Air Corsica Mea
- Fleet size: 14
- Destinations: 24
- Parent company: Collectivité Territoriale de Corse, Air France–KLM
- Headquarters: Ajaccio, Corsica, France
- Key people: Philippe Dandrieux (CEO)
- Website: aircorsica.com

Compagnie Aérienne Corse Méditerranée S.A.E.M. (Corsican: Cumpagnia Aerea Corsa Mediterrania), later branded CCM Airlines and renamed Air Corsica in 2010, is the flag carrier of the French island of Corsica. The headquarters are located at Napoléon Bonaparte Airport in Ajaccio. It operates passenger services from Corsica to continental France. Its main operating base is at Napoleon Bonaparte Airport, with other hubs at Figari–Sud Corse Airport, Bastia-Poretta Airport and Calvi-Sainte-Catherine Airport.

== History ==
The company was founded on January 1, 1989, on the initiative of the President of the Regional Assembly of Corsica Pierre Philippe Ceccaldi to improve flight connections from and to the island. Its first flight took place in June 1990 and schedules were started on 1 July with a fleet of ATR 72-600. Initial prospects were accompanied by growing success and the company found itself having to order jetliners such as the Fokker F28. In November 2000 the brand name CCM Airlines started to be used, leading to a full name change to Air Corsica in October 2010. At the same time, two Airbus A319s and two Airbus A320s had entered the fleet.

In December 2019, with the arrival of its first Airbus A320neo, Air Corsica became the first French operator of the A320neo.

Air Corsica operates certain flights as a franchise for Air France and ITA Airways. Air Corsica outsources its passenger service system, which manages reservations, inventory and pricing to Amadeus using the Altéa system.

== Destinations ==
Departure points (in Corsica)
	Calvi	Bastia	Ajaccio	Figari
Brussels (Charleroi)	Seasonal	Seasonal	Seasonal	Seasonal
Paris (Orly)	Year-round	Year-round	Year-round	Year-round
Dole		Seasonal		
Clermont-Ferrand			Seasonal	
Lyon	Seasonal	Year-round	Year-round	Seasonal
Toulouse	Seasonal	Seasonal	Year-round	Seasonal
Marseille	Year-round	Year-round	Year-round	Year-round
Nice	Year-round	Year-round	Year-round	Year-round
Olbia				Seasonal
Milan (Malpensa)				Seasonal
Venice		Seasonal		
Rome (Fiumicino)		Seasonal	Year-round	
Naples		Seasonal	Seasonal	

== Codeshare agreements ==
Air Corsica has codeshare agreements with the following airlines:

- Air Caraibes
- Air France
- Air France Hop
- ITA Airways

== Fleet ==
=== Current fleet ===
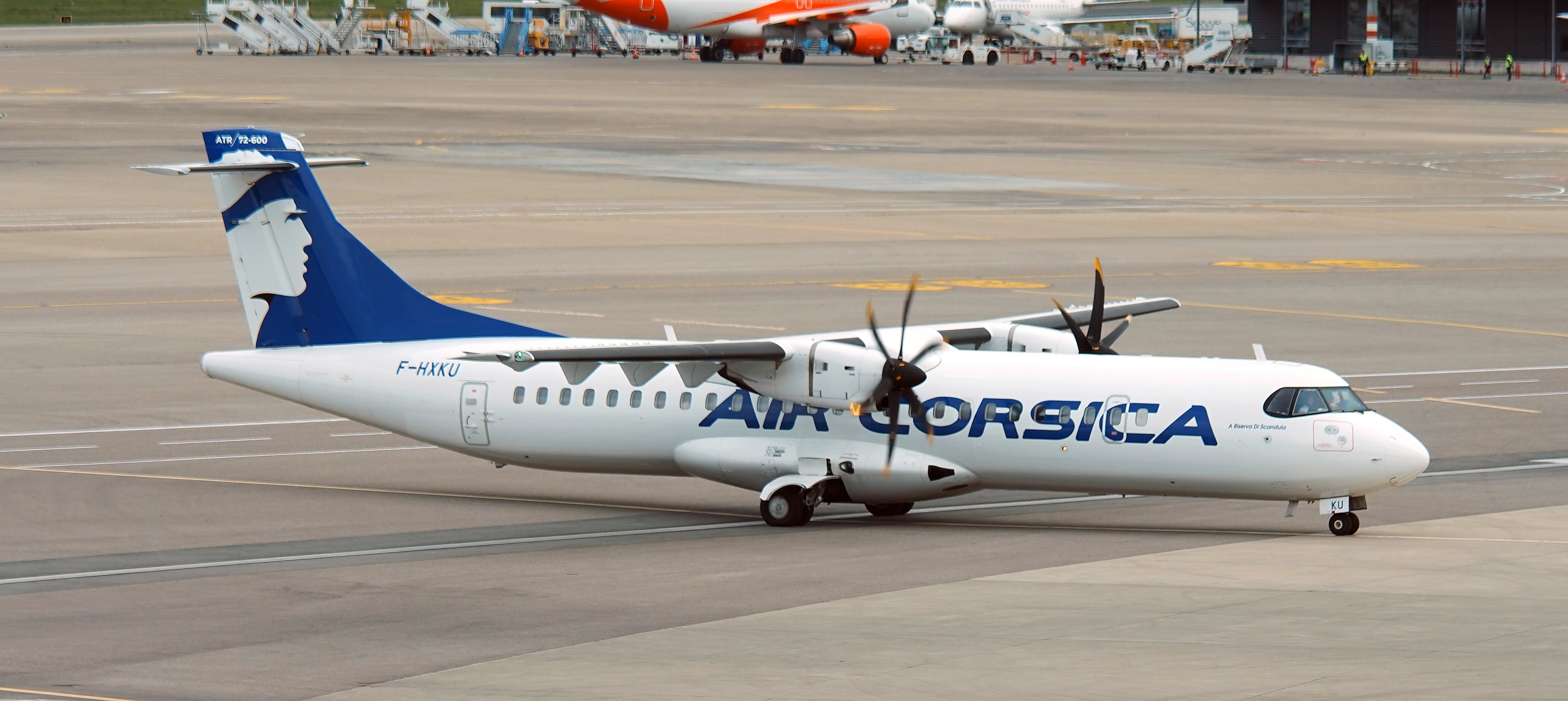
ATR 72-500

As of July 2026, Air Corsica operates the following aircraft:

Air Corsica fleet
Aircraft	In service	Orders	Passengers	Notes
Airbus A320	3	—	180	
Airbus A320neo	4	—	186	
ATR 72-600	7	—	72	
Total	14	—		

=== Former fleet ===
As of August 2025, Air Corsica operated 2 Airbus A320, 4 Airbus A320neo and 7 ATR 72-600:

As of February 2023 the airline operated the following aircraft:

- F-GRPZ, ATR 72-500
- F-GRPY, ATR 72-500
- F-HDGK, A320-216
- F-HZFM, A320-216

=== Compagnie Aérienne Corse Méditerranée-"CCM" fleet ===
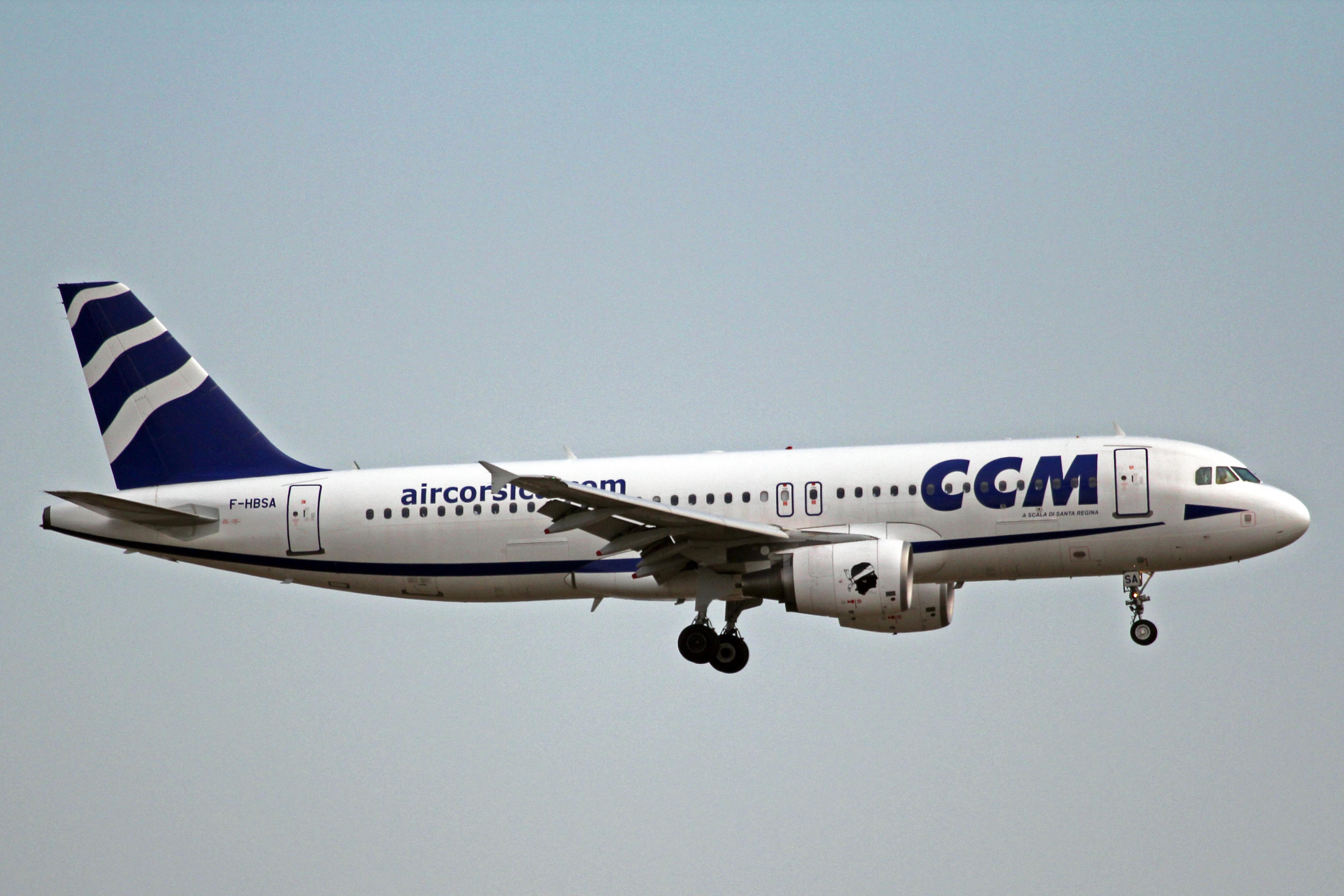
Airbus A320-200

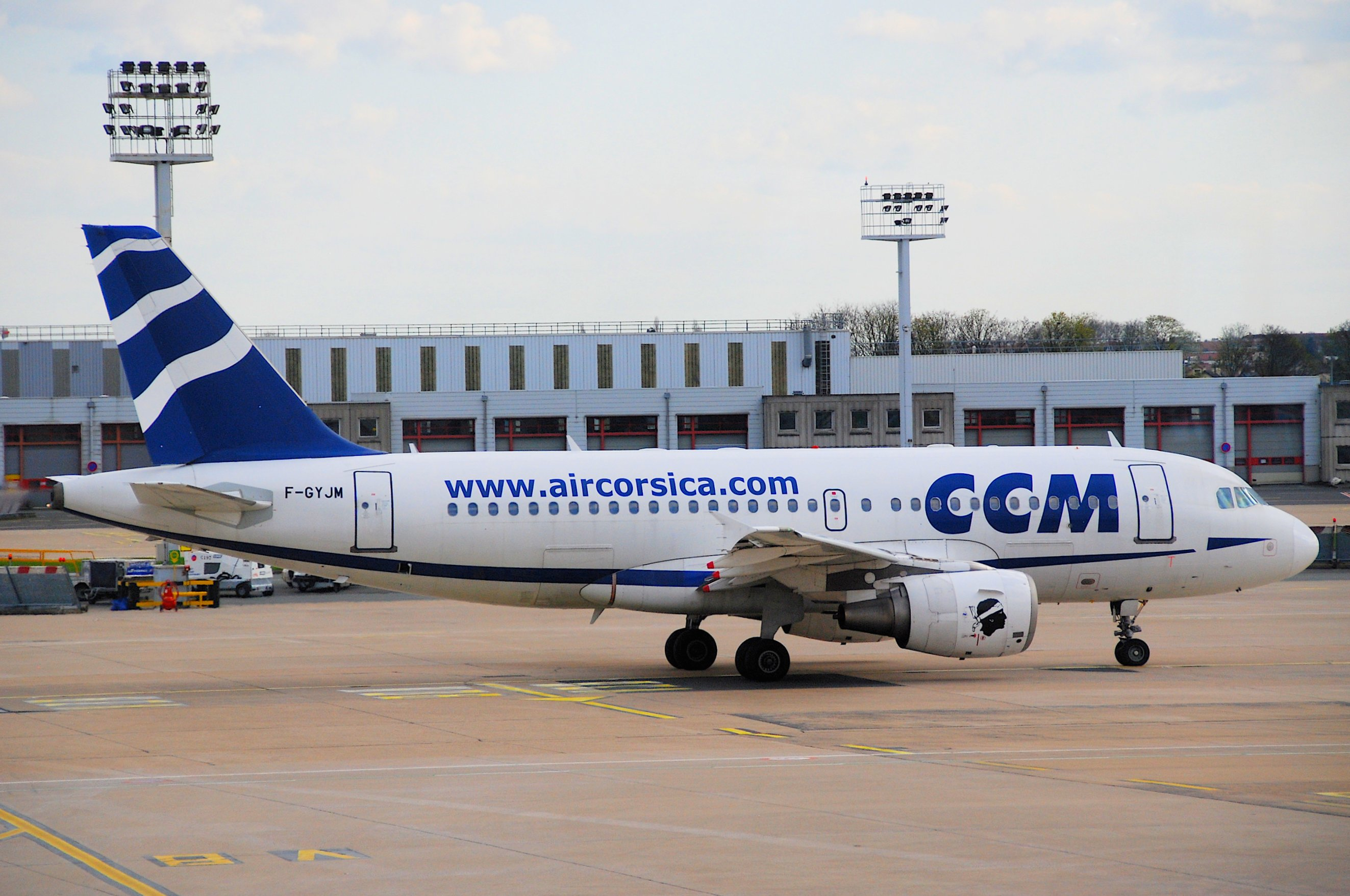
Airbus A319

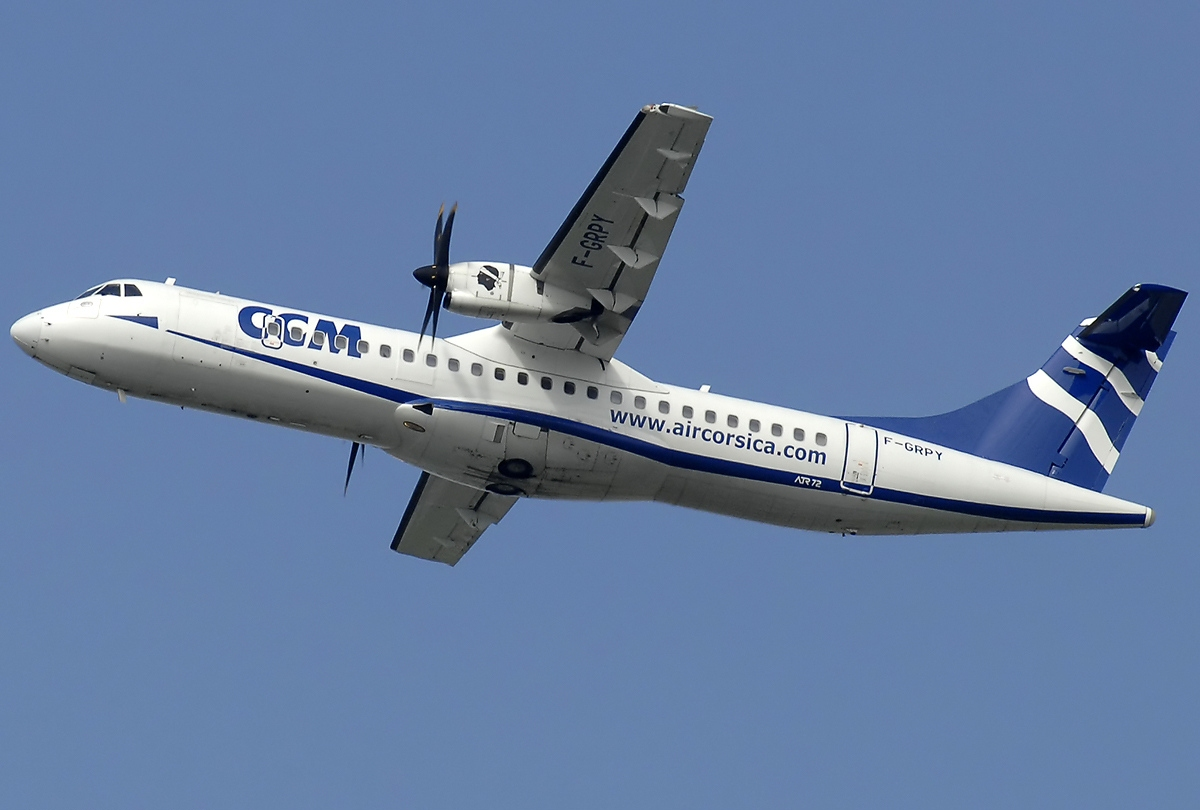
ATR 72-200
