= Jean-Marc Janaillac =

French businessman (born 1953)

- Born: 26 April 1953 (age 72); Saint-Sulpice-de-Roumagnac, France
- Education: Lycée Stanislas
- Alma mater: HEC Paris; ÉNA
- Occupation: Businessman

Jean-Marc Janaillac (born 26 April 1953) is a French businessman best known for being a former CEO of Air France–KLM.

== Early life and education ==
Janaillac was born on 26 April 1953 in Saint-Sulpice-de-Roumagnac, a village in the Dordogne department, in southwest France.

Janaillac holds a licence in law. He graduated from HEC Paris in 1975 and the École nationale d'administration – a graduate school entrusted with the selection and initial training of senior French officials – in 1980.

== Career ==
=== Career in public service ===
From 1980 to 1983, Janaillac was chief of staff for the prefects of Finistère (Brittany in western France) and then Val-d'Oise (Île-de-France).

From 1983 to 1984, he was head of staff for the Secretary of State for Tourism.

From 1984 to 1987, he served as general manager of the French Tourist Office in New York.

=== Career in the private sector ===
Janaillac spent ten years from 1987 to 1997 as general manager of Maison de la France, an economic interest grouping created to promote tourism in France. During this time span, he was also an Air France board member (from 1989 to 1994).

He then joined AOM French Airlines and served from 1997 to 2000, first as executive vice-president then as chief operating officer.

From 2000 to 2002, he was chairman and chief executive officer of Maeva, a vacation residence company belonging to the Pierre & Vacances group.

He then served from 2002 to 2004 as chairman of the Paris Convention and Visitors Bureau.

In 2004, he joined the RATP Group first as chief officer for development then as chairman of RATP Development.

On 3 December 2012 Janaillac was made chairman and chief executive officer of Transdev and a board member of Caisse des dépôts et consignations, a French financial organization and Transdev's parent company.

=== Air France-KLM, 2016–2018 ===
In May 2016 Janaillac was selected as the next CEO of Air France–KLM, following the resignation of Alexandre de Juniac.

The company had a good year in 2017 but a difficult first quarter in 2018 and staff and management were again locked in a dispute over pay increases starting in February 2018. Janaillac proposed a 7% wage increase over 4 years instead of the immediate 6% requested by the unions and, in order to obtain direct approval from the staff, asked for vote, warning that he would resign if his offer was rejected. He resigned on 4 May 2018, after 55% of the airline's staff rejected the offer. On 15 May Frédéric Gagey was named interim CEO.

== Other activities ==
- Caisse des dépôts et consignations, Member of the Supervisory Board

Business positions
Preceded by Alexandre de Juniac	CEO of Air France–KLM; 2016–2018	Succeeded by Frédéric Gagey; Acting
