= Benjamin Smith (Canadian businessman) =

Canadian executive and current CEO of Air France–KLM (born 1971)

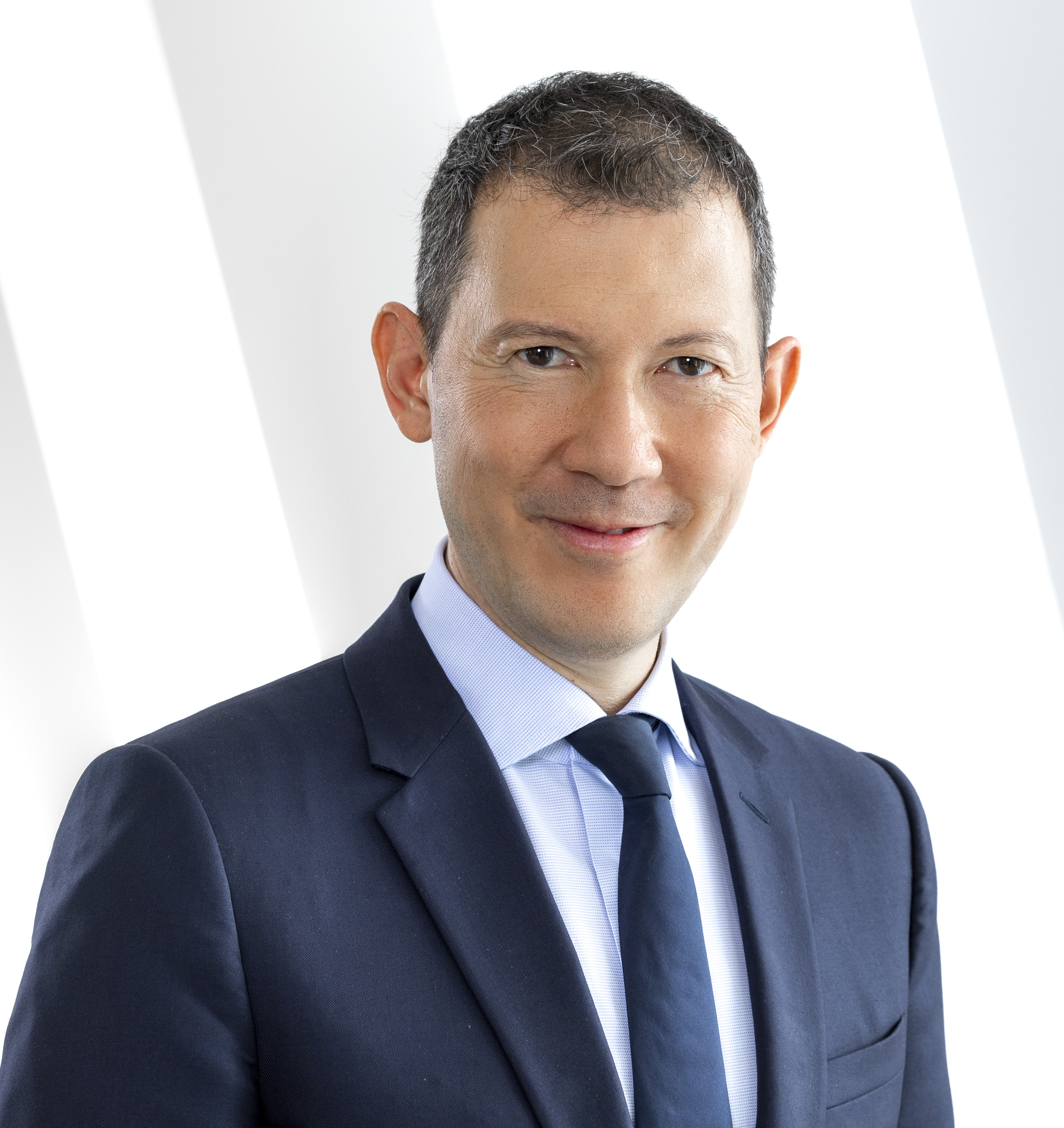
- Born: Benjamin Mark Smith; 27 August 1971 (age 54); United Kingdom
- Education: University of Western Ontario
- Occupation: CEO of Air France–KLM (2018–present)

Benjamin Mark Smith (born 27 August 1971) is a Canadian businessman and airline executive. He has been the CEO of Air France–KLM since 2018. Prior to that, he was Air Canada's President and Chief Operating Officer (COO).

== Personal life and education ==
Benjamin Smith was born on 27 August 1971 in the United Kingdom. He holds a Bachelor of Arts in economics from the University of Western Ontario. He lives in Paris with his family.

== Aviation career ==
A life-long aviation enthusiast, he began his career in 1990 as a unionised ground Customer Sales and Service Agent at Air Ontario, a regional airline subsidiary of Air Canada, in parallel with his studies. In 1992 he left the airline to open a retail corporate travel agency, which he operated for eight years.

=== Air Canada ===
In 1999, he worked as a consultant before rejoining Air Canada. As managing director of Air Canada Tango, he was responsible for writing the business plan and successfully launching this new low-cost subsidiary, with 21 aircraft transferred from Air Canada. In 2001, Tango introduced a new commercial model: the subsidiary offered a blend of low-cost and full-service products and services which proved successful.

In 2004, the Tango model was rolled out across Air Canada's entire North American network. The Tango operation was absorbed into the mainline carrier with the brand Tango kept as Air Canada's base fare under the new commercial model developed at Tango. Subsequently, Smith was appointed vice president, Network Planning, within Air Canada.

In 2007, Smith was appointed to the Air Canada executive management team as Chief Commercial Officer, responsible for Network Planning, Revenue Management, Marketing (including brand management, customer experience, and loyalty), Cargo, Alliances, and Global Sales. He is described as the "driver of Air Canada's commercial strategy" leading to the development of three global hubs in Toronto, Montreal, and Vancouver. He contributed to the transformation of the airline, including the purchase of a new large fleet of wide-body and narrow-body aircraft. Overall, he led a global network expansion resulting in links to more than 200 destinations on six continents, with a fleet of 350 aircraft.

In 2013, he launched the low-cost company Air Canada Rouge.

In 2014, he was the chief negotiator with the airline's pilot and cabin crew unions which resulted in landmark 10-year collective agreements. In the same year, he was appointed president, Airlines (Air Canada, Rouge, Express and Cargo) and Chief Operating Officer of Air Canada.

During his tenure, the airline's profitability grew by over twenty-fold and Air Canada was awarded the Skytrax Best Airline in North America seven times.

=== Air France–KLM ===
The Air France–KLM Group Board of Directors appointed Smith as the new Group's CEO on 16 August 2018, the first non-French chief executive in the company's history.

Smith achieved in a few months labor stability at Air France after years of internal conflict. He embarked on a Group-wide fleet modernization program which saw the retirement of Air France and KLM's Airbus A380, Boeing 747 and Airbus A340 aircraft, replacing them with Airbus A350s and Boeing 787s.

In 2019, a new agreement with Air France's pilot union removed the fleet size and geographical restrictions on the Group's low-cost subsidiary Transavia. A large fleet order of Airbus A320neos was subsequently placed to embark on an ambitious growth strategy.

Smith successfully navigated the COVID-19 crisis. Billions of euros in stabilizing direct and guaranteed loans by the French and Dutch States were used to ensure the survivability of the Group. The loans have now been fully repaid.

Smith appointed new CEOs at the group's two major subsidiaries which has led to an improvement of synergies.

On 31 March 2022, the Board of Directors of Air France-KLM renewed his contract as CEO for a further five years.

=== Westjet ===
On 6 September 2023, WestJet appointed Smith as non-executive vice-chair of the Board.

== Recognition ==
Smith was made a Knight of the Legion of Honour (France) in July 2023.
