= Alexandre de Juniac =

French businessman (born 1962)

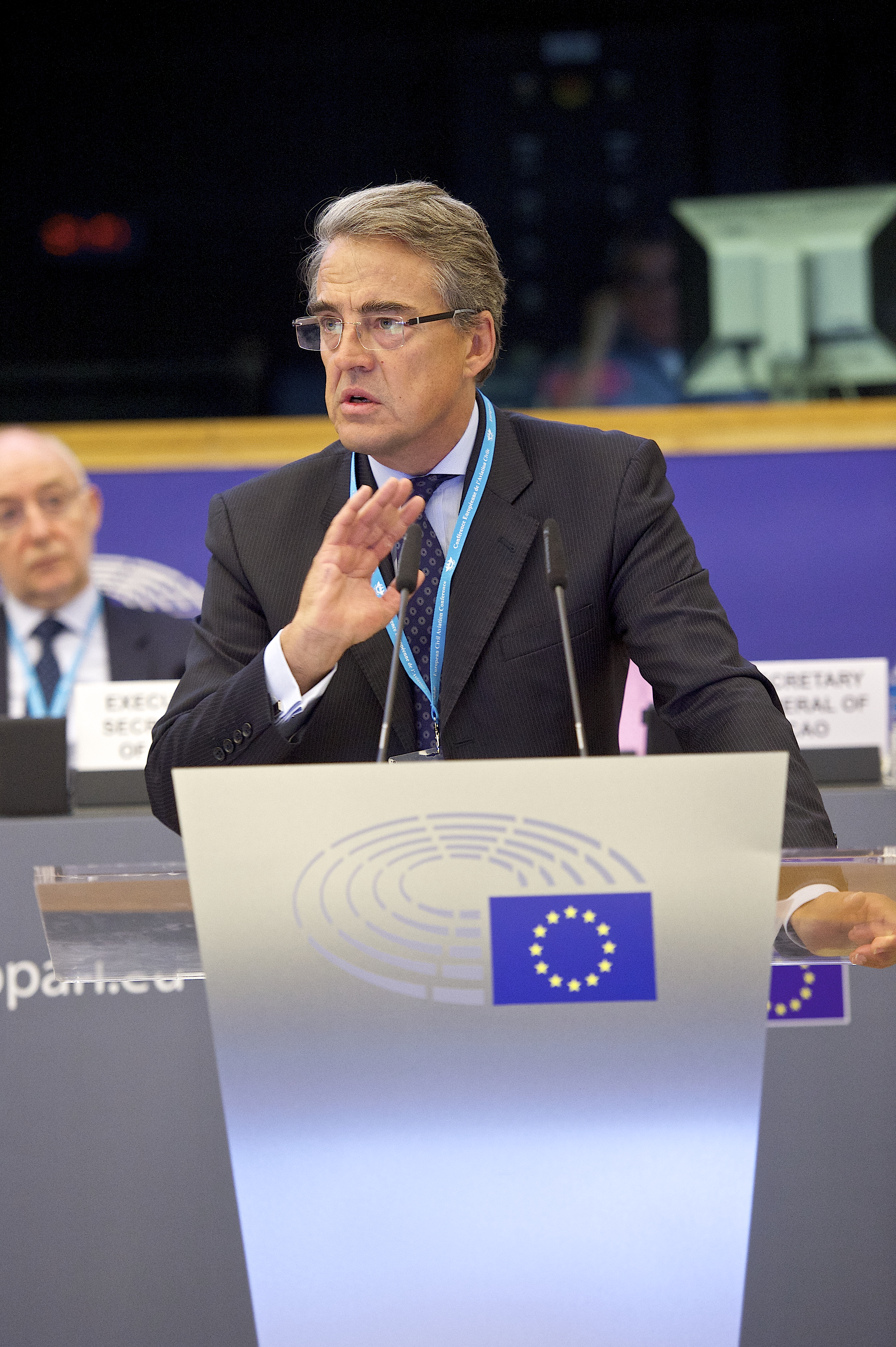
- De Juniac in 2018
- Born: 10 November 1962 (age 63); Neuilly-sur-Seine, France
- Education: Lycée Pasteur
- Alma mater: École Polytechnique, ÉNA
- Occupation: Businessman
- Children: 4

Alexandre de Juniac (born 10 November 1962) is a French businessman.

== Career ==
=== Public sector ===
De Juniac served as an adviser to Nicolas Sarkozy at the Ministry of Budgets and Christine Lagarde at the Ministry of Economics and Finance when they were French ministers.

In his role at the Ministry of Economics and Finance, de Juniac worked closely on a 900 million euro capital increase the state-controlled nuclear group Areva announced in 2010. That same, a French government ethics body opposed his nomination to succeed Anne Lauvergeon as CEO of Areva, arguing that his role as chief of staff of Lagarde would be "incompatible" with the position.

=== Private sector ===
De Juniac served as the chairman and CEO of Air France (2011–2013) and CEO of Air France–KLM (2013–2016). His predecessor Pierre-Henri Gourgeon had personally advocated for de Juniac, who had no previous experience in the airline industry at that point, to succeed him at Air France. He later succeeded Jean-Cyril Spinetta as CEO of parent company Air France-KLM. During his tenure, he was credited with restructuring Air France-KLM without, for the most part, setting off a major conflict with the company's unions. Right after becoming CEO in 2013, de Juniac launched an efficiency plan called Perform 2020, which, among other things, envisaged the expansion of the group's Transavia budget airline. But in 2014, plans to open bases for Transavia outside France led to a 15-day pilot strike.

De Juniac became Director General and CEO of the International Air Transport Association on 1 September 2016. He stood down from the role at the end of March 2021.

In 2023, management consulting firm Oliver Wyman appointed de Juniac as Senior Advisor for its transportation practice.

== Other activities ==
- Indigo Group, Member of the Board of Directors (since 2023)
- Simaero, Member of the Board of Directors
- JetAirlines, Member of the Board of Directors
- Riyadh Air, Member of the Board of Directors
- Afiniti, Member of the Advisory Board
- Europcar, chair of the Board of Directors (2021–2022)
- Arkema, Member of the Board of Directors (2018–2021)
- Vivendi, Member of the Board of Directors (2013–2017)

Business positions
Preceded by Jean-Cyril Spinetta	CEO of Air France-KLM; 2013–2016	Succeeded by Jean-Marc Janaillac
Preceded by Tony Tyler	Director General of the International Air Transport Association; 2016–2021	Succeeded by Willie Walsh
