= Transavia France =

Low-cost airline of France

- Airbus A320neo
IATA	ICAO	Call sign
TO	TVF	FRANCE SOLEIL
- Founded: 14 November 2006; 19 years ago
- Commenced operations: May 2007; 19 years ago
- Operating bases: Lyon; Montpellier; Nantes; Paris–Orly
- Fleet size: 86
- Destinations: 122
- Parent company: Air France–KLM
- Headquarters: Orly, France
- Key people: Oltion Carkaxhija, CEO of Transavia Olivier Mazzucchelli (CEO) of Transavia France
- Website: www.transavia.com

Transavia Airlines S.A.S., trading as Transavia France and formerly branded as transavia.com France, is a French low-cost airline owned by Air France–KLM and is based at Paris Orly Airport. It shares the corporate image, website and operating model with the Dutch affiliate, Transavia.

== History ==
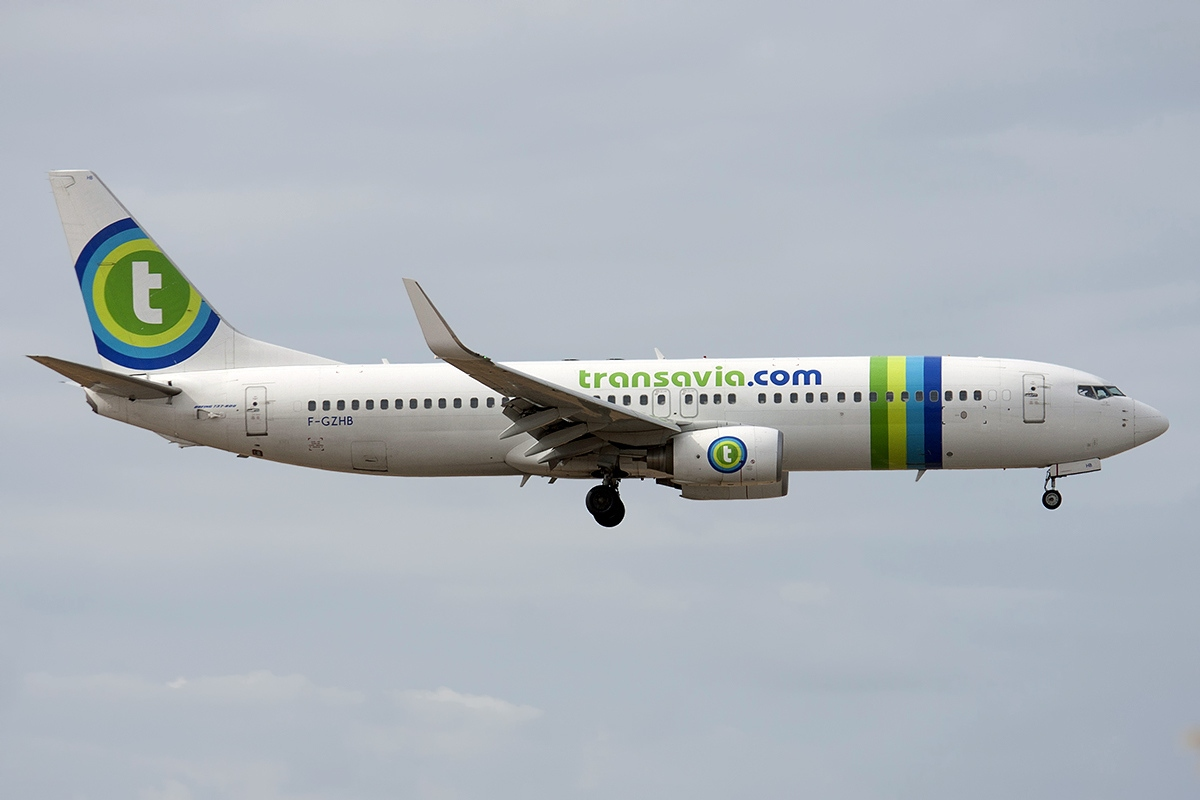
Boeing 737-800 in the first livery

Transavia France was established as transavia.com France on 14 November 2006 by Air France and the Dutch airline Transavia (transavia.com in those times) and began flight operations in May 2007, both scheduled and charter flights.

Transavia France chiefly operates scheduled and charter services to leisure and some metropolitan destinations and is now positioned as part of Air France-KLM's joint low-cost brand which operates under the Transavia name in both the Netherlands and France. By early 2015, Transavia France, together with its Dutch sister company, received a new corporate design, dropping the ".com" from its public appearance as well as changing its primary colors from white/green/blue to white/green. In 2013 Antoine Pussiau was the CEO since January. Natalie Stubler, as CEO of Transavia France from 2016-2022, expanded the number of destinations and the fleet.

In 2018, Transavia France decided to further expand its base at Lyon Airport and at Nantes Airport with the addition of more based aircraft and the expansion of the existing routes.

In November 2019, Transavia France stated that it would open a new base in Spring 2020 at Montpellier–Méditerranée Airport with a plan to serve 20 routes by the end of that year.

== Corporate affairs ==
=== Ownership and structure ===
Transavia France is a joint venture between Air France and Transavia of the Netherlands, both of which in turn are fully owned by Air France-KLM. Transavia is run as an independent operation, with both arms operating with an identical business model, website and image.

=== Business trends ===
The performance figures for the Transavia brand operations (Transavia and Transavia France) are reported within the published annual accounts of their ultimate parent, Air France-KLM. The financials for both parts of the brand are fully incorporated in the Air France-KLM accounts.

=== Business model ===
Transavia operates as a low-cost carrier and, as such, uses a single aircraft type (Boeing 737, to be replaced by the Airbus A320neo family) with a single class of cabin. The airline offers the "Assortment on Board" buy on board service offering food and drinks for purchase.

=== Head office ===
Transavia France is headquartered at Paris-Orly Airport in Orly.

== Destinations ==
Countries in which Transavia France operates as of March 2026

The airline reached 100 destinations from Paris-Orly in the summer of 2022, becoming the largest low-cost airline in Paris by destinations served.

== Fleet ==
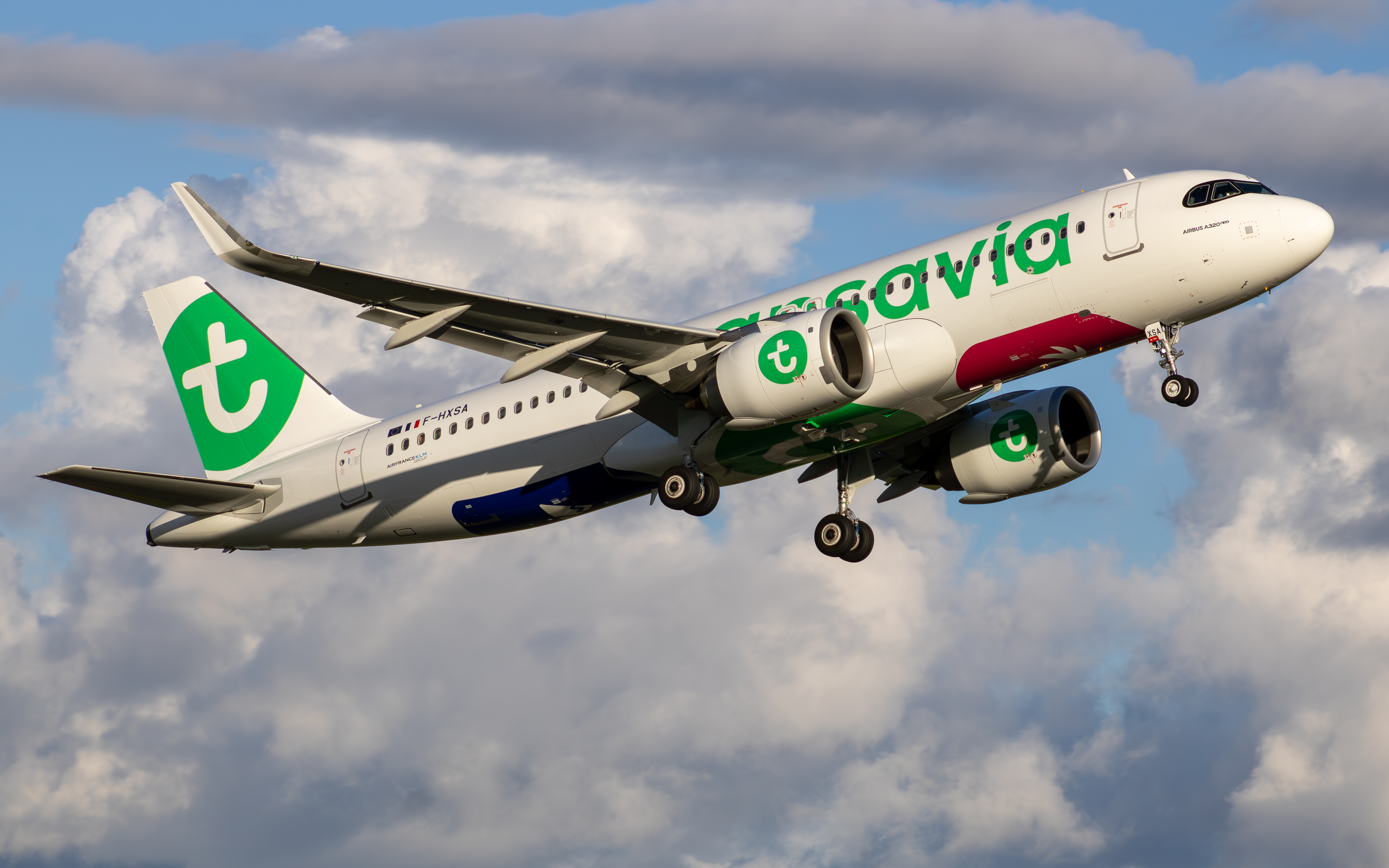
Airbus A320neo

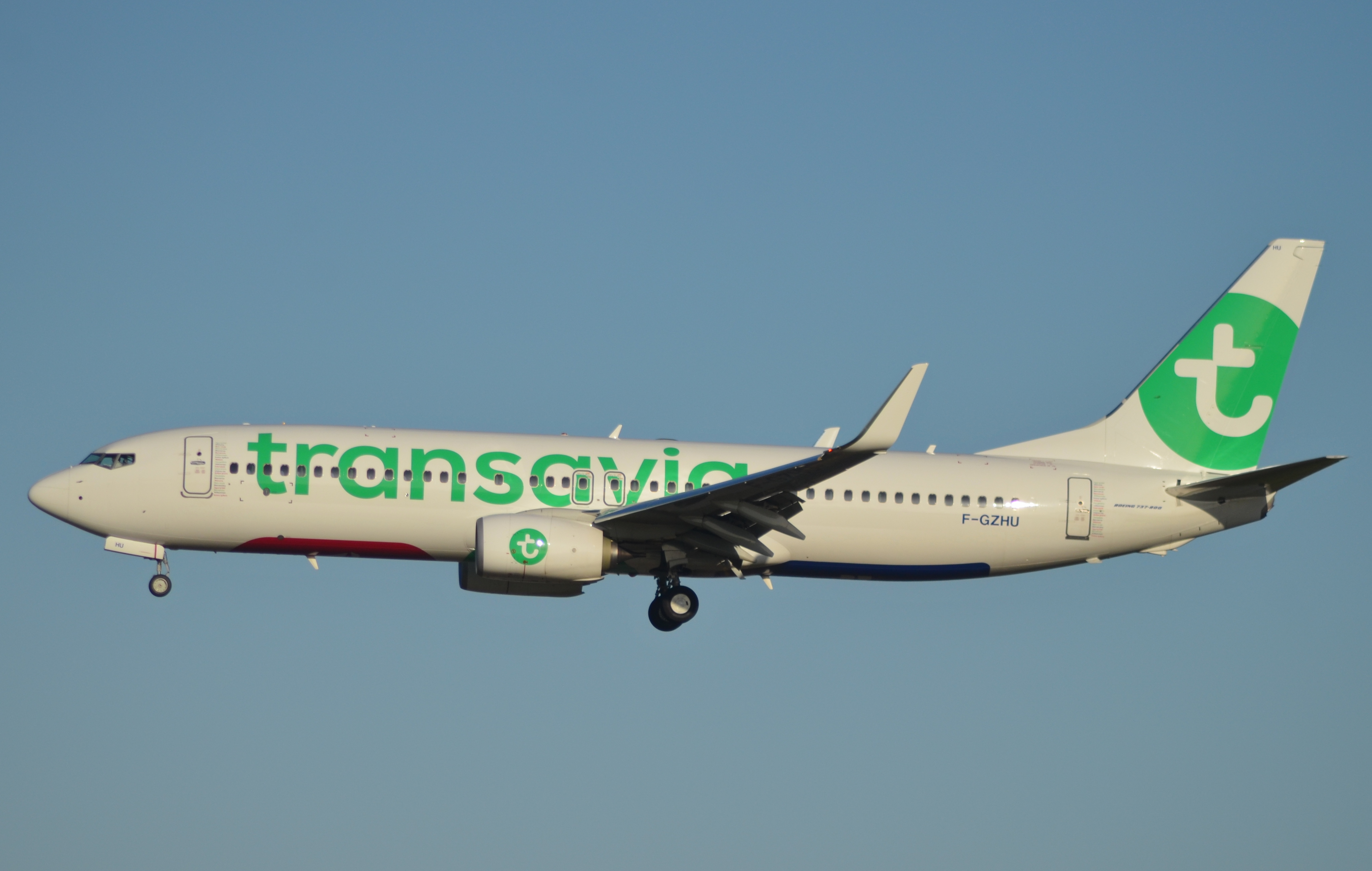
Boeing 737-800

As of October 2026, Transavia France operates the following aircraft:

Transavia France fleet
Aircraft	In service	Orders	Passengers	Notes
Airbus A320neo	31	2	186	Deliveries ongoing. To replace Boeing 737-800.
Airbus A321neo	—	5	232	First delivery expected March 2027. Total of 5 aircraft are expected between summer 2027
Boeing 737-800	64	—	189	To be replaced by Airbus A320neo family.
Total	95	7		

== Awards and recognition ==
On 24 June 2024, Transavia was voted runner-up for Best Low-Cost Airline in Europe for the year 2024 by Skytrax.
