= Air France KLM Martinair Cargo =

Cargo airline

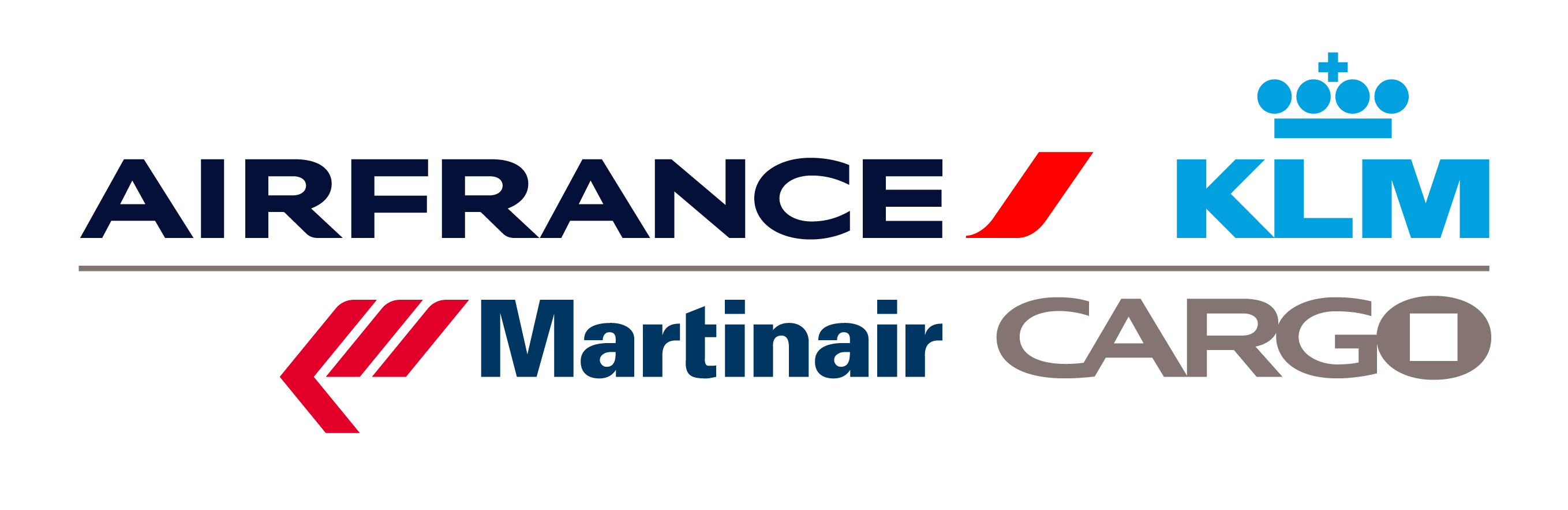
IATA	ICAO	Call sign
AF KL MP	AFR KLM MPH	AIRFRANS KLM MARTINAIR
- Hubs: Charles de Gaulle Airport Amsterdam Airport Schiphol
- Alliance: SkyTeam
- Fleet size: 6
- Destinations: More than 300
- Employees: 3 000
- Website: https://www.afklcargo.com

Air France KLM Martinair Cargo is the air cargo specialist of the Air France-KLM. Operating from its two hubs, Paris-Charles de Gaulle (CDG) and Amsterdam-Schiphol (AMS), Air France KLM Martinair Cargo transport a diverse range of goods to destinations all around the world.

Air France KLM Martinair Cargo operates to around 300 destinations worldwide. Besides operating 6 dedicated freighter aircraft, the company also has access to cargo capacity on 417 passenger aircraft belonging to the Air France KLM Group. Air France KLM Martinair Cargo has over 3 000 employees.

At AF-KLM Group level, the Cargo Management Team is headed by Adriaan den Heijer for Air France KLM Martinair Cargo and Christophe Boucher for the Air France Cargo entity within Air France.

== History ==
Air France Cargo and KLM Cargo joined forces in 2004.

Air France KLM Martinair Cargo is part of Skyteam, an air cargo alliance, along with 11 other airlines.

On 23 February 2009, Air France KLM Cargo took delivery of its first Boeing 777F and was the launch customer for this aircraft.

During the COVID-19 pandemic, it was one of the first groups to begin transporting temperature-controlled pharmaceutical products.

On 16 December 2021, Air France KLM Cargo signed a letter of intent for the acquisition of four Airbus A350F aircraft.

On 3 April 2023, Air France-KLM and CMA CGM Air Cargo officially launched their long-term strategic air cargo partnership: a commercial joint-venture that combines both groups’ complementary air cargo offerings.

However, on 16 January 2024, Air France-KLM and CMA CGM announced they would terminate their strategic air cargo partnership, effective 31 March 2024, due to restrictive regulatory environments in key markets. While ending the joint venture initiated in April 2023, both companies stated they would continue to work together independently, with CMA CGM remaining a major shareholder.

== Activities & Products ==
Air France KLM Martinair Cargo's commercial portfolio revolves around four distinct product segments:

1. General: Standard shipping services.
2. Express Shipping: time-sensitive deliveries.
3. Specialized: Tailored services for specific cargo categories, including:
  - Fresh products
  - Pharmaceutical products
  - Dangerous goods
  - Live animals
  - Valuable products
  - Cars
  - Aerospace materials
  - Art
  - Human remains
4. Customized: Fully tailored shipping.

Air France KLM Martinair Cargo offers two levels of service:

- Standard: service to meet standard shipping needs.
- Plus (High Priority & Extra Care): Elevated service providing high-priority handling and extra care for shipments that require special attention.

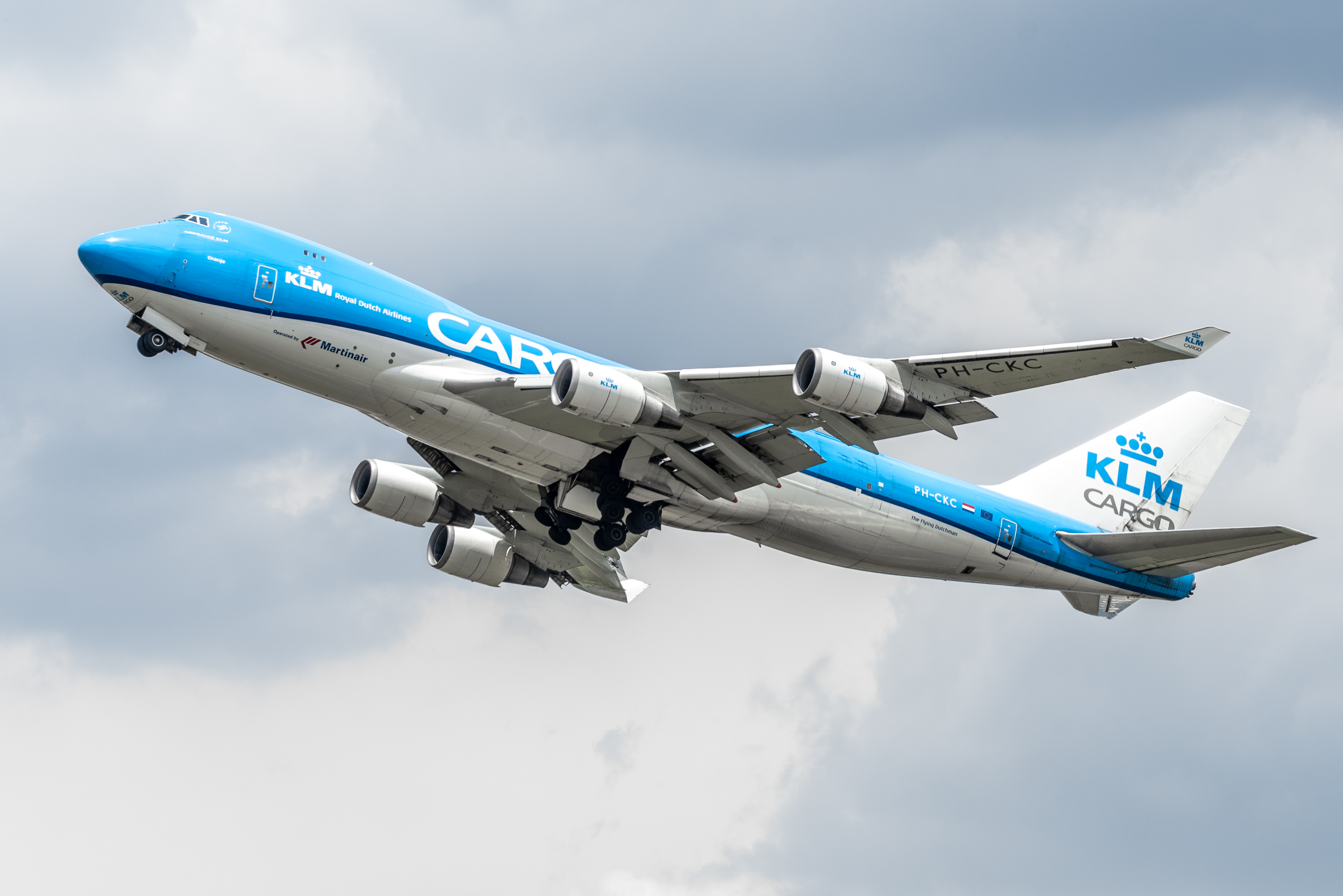
Boeing 747 KLM

== Fleet ==
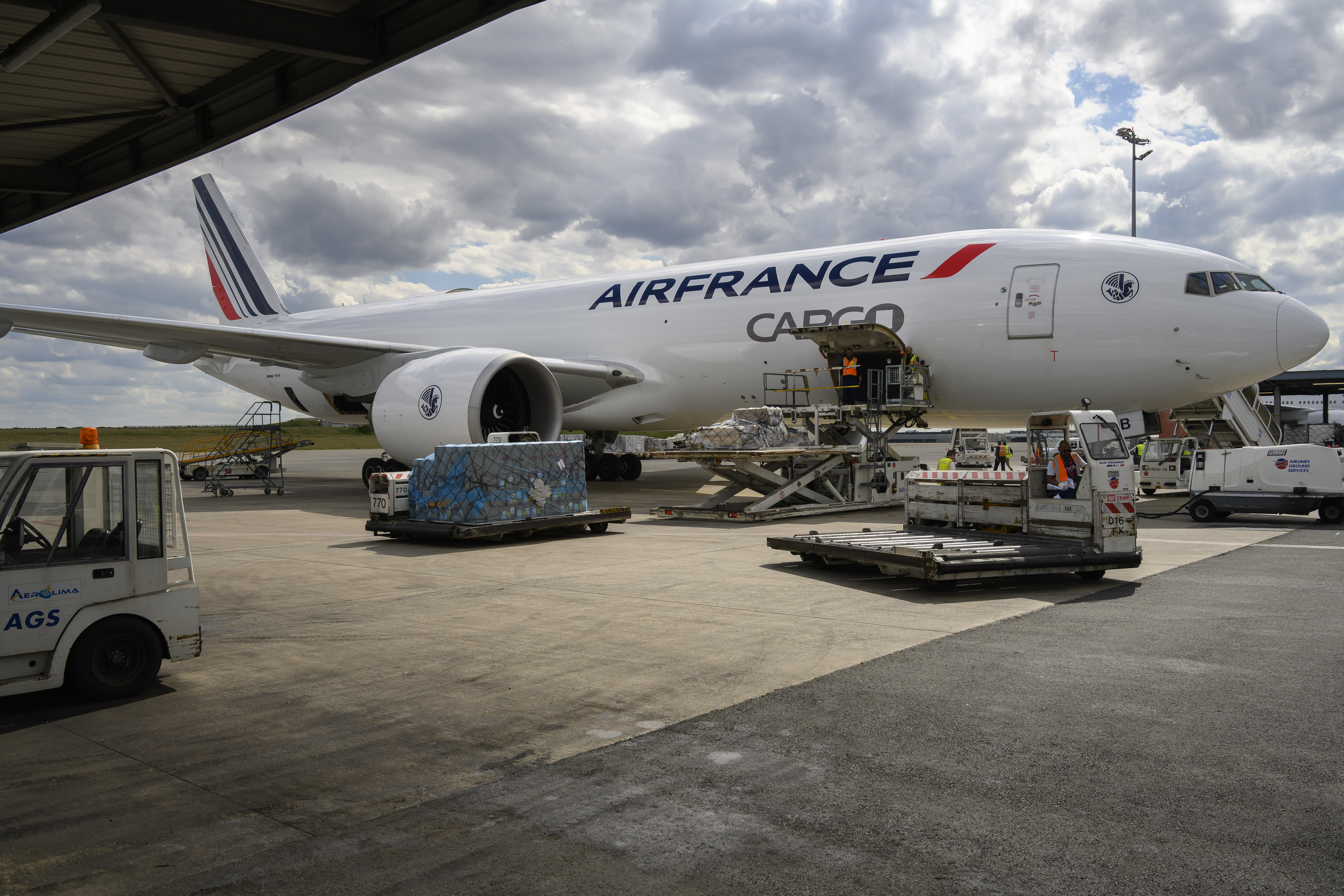
Boeing 777 Air France Cargo

As of December 2023, the AFKLMP Cargo fleet consists of the following aircraft:

Aircraft	In service	On order	Notes
Boeing B777F	2	—	
Boeing B747-400F	4	—	
Airbus A350F	—	8	Delivery starting in 2026
Total	6	8	

== Numbers ==
- 2 hubs: Paris-Charles de Gaulle (CDG) and Amsterdam-Schiphol (AMS)

- 1 million tons of cargo flown in 2022

- 208,000 m² of warehouse floor surface

== Hubs ==
=== Paris-Charles de Gaulle (CDG) ===
Recognized as one of the largest cargo hubs globally, it is situated within an hour's drive from Rungis, the world's largest wholesale food market.

=== Amsterdam Schiphol (AMS) ===
The Amsterdam Schiphol Hub, situated at Schiphol Airport, is located within a 20-minute drive from Royal Flora Holland, the largest trading center for flowers globally.

== See also ==
- Air France-KLM
- SkyTeam
- CMA CGM
