= Transavia =

Low-cost airline of the Netherlands

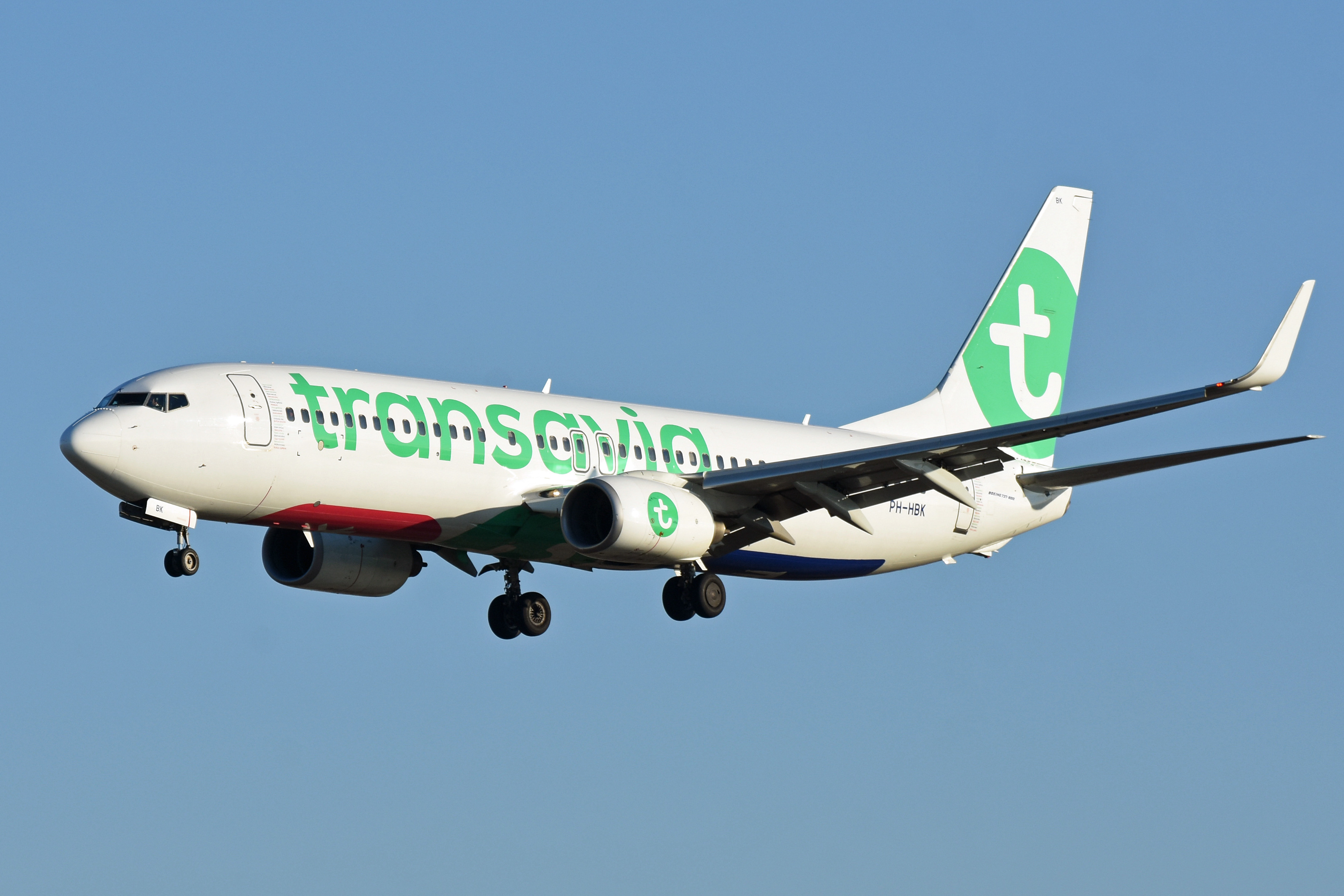
- Transavia Boeing 737-800 in 2024
IATA	ICAO	Call sign
HV	TRA	TRANSAVIA
- Commenced operations: 17 November 1966; 59 years ago
- Operating bases: Amsterdam; Brussels; Eindhoven; Rotterdam
- Frequent-flyer program: Flying Blue
- Fleet size: 47 (2024)
- Destinations: 96
- Parent company: Air France-KLM
- Headquarters: Haarlemmermeer, Netherlands
- Key people: Paul Terstegge (CEO Transavia Netherlands) Oltion Carkaxhija (CEO Transavia)
- Revenue: ▲€1.744 billion (2019)
- Operating income: ▼€131 million (2019)
- Website: www.transavia.com

Transavia Airlines C.V., trading as Transavia and formerly branded as transavia.com, is a Dutch low-cost airline and a wholly owned subsidiary of KLM and therefore part of the Air France–KLM group. Its main base is Amsterdam Airport Schiphol and it has other bases at Rotterdam The Hague Airport, Eindhoven Airport and Brussels Airport.

== History ==
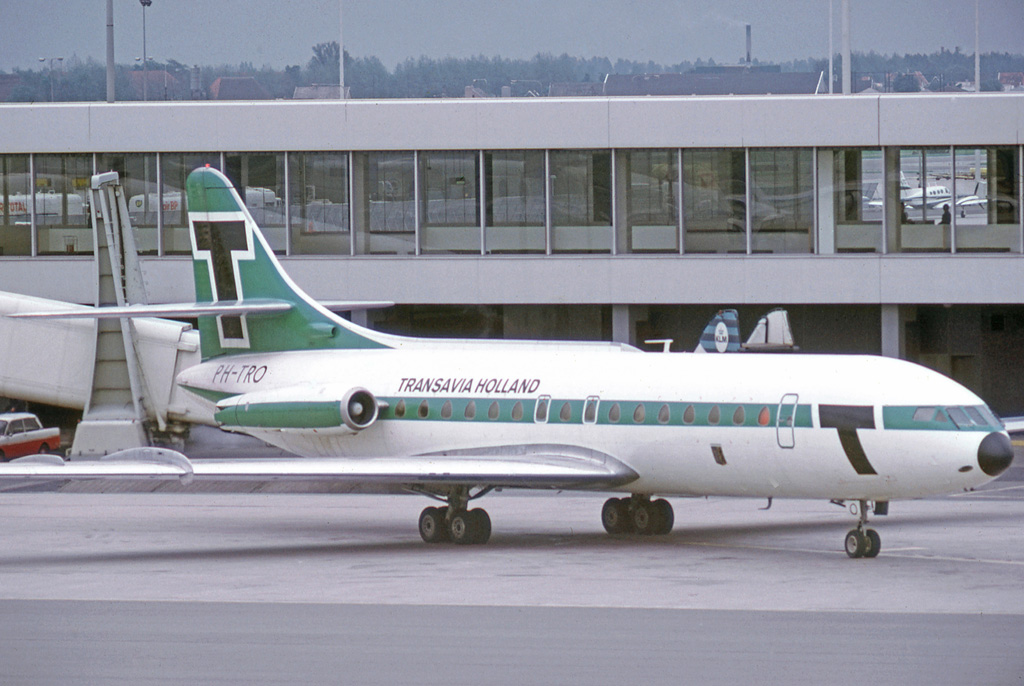
Transavia Sud Caravelle at Amsterdam's Schiphol Airport in 1972

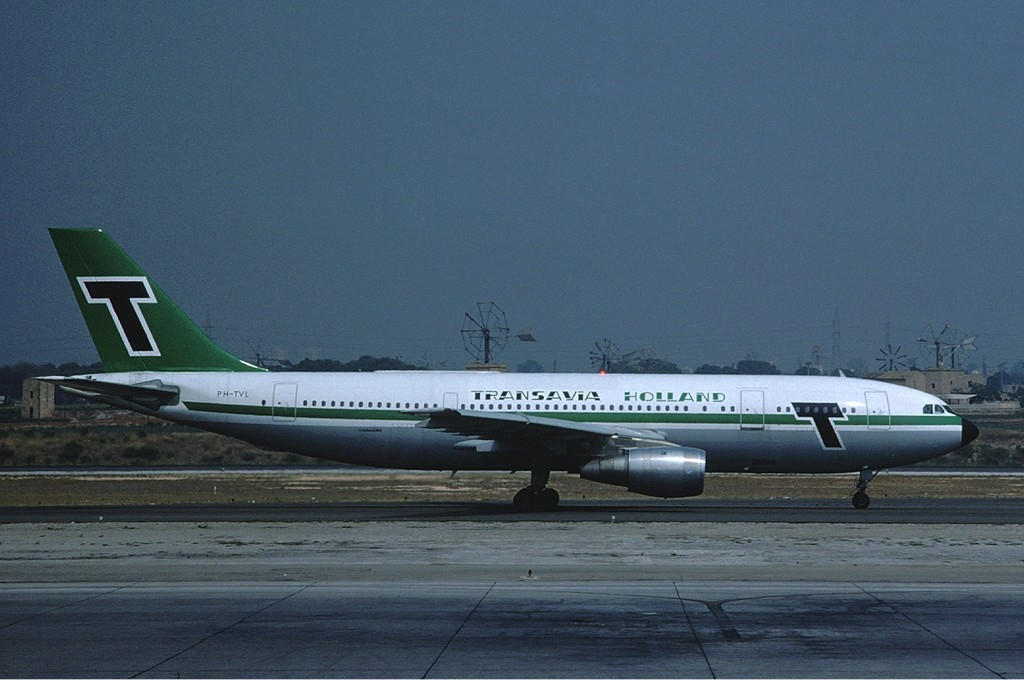
Transavia Airbus A300 in 1976

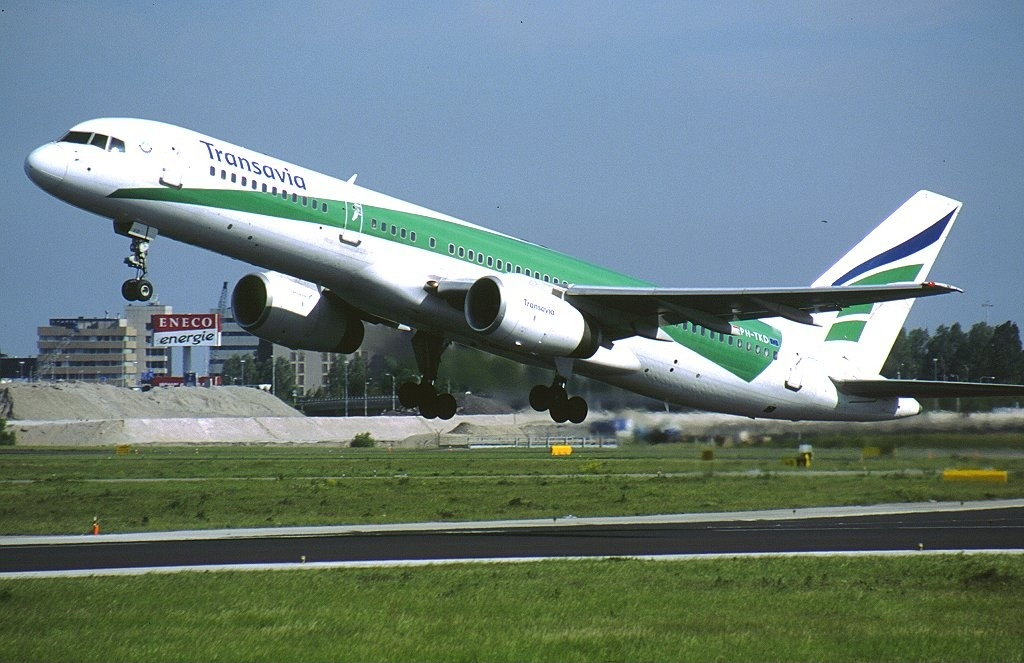
Transavia Boeing 757-200 in 2001

=== Early years ===
The first brainstorming sessions about starting a second charter company in the Netherlands, after Martinair, started in spring 1966, when the American Chalmers Goodlin met with captain Pete Holmes. "Slick" Goodlin had recently bought the dormant small company Transavia Limburg, based in Maastricht, which had three 83-seat Douglas DC-6s (plus 3 pilots and 3 cabin crew). The Dutch government needed to be approached in order to obtain an operating license for the airline, both in order to be allowed to operate out of Amsterdam Airport, and for these DC-6s.

At that stage John Block, a former member of the Martinair Holland management, was willing to take that on. He succeeded, the license was issued on 14 November 1966, and two days later, on 16 November 1966, the airline's first commercial flight – Amsterdam/Naples/Amsterdam – was completed.; On board were the Dutch Ballet Orchestra and the Dutch Dance Theatre. This was the first flight with the new name of Transavia Holland. The company found offices at the old Schiphol Airport, Hangar 7.

The first of fourteen second hand Sud Aviation Caravelle twin-jet airliners to be operated by Transavia was delivered in summer 1969, and the type remained in service with the airline until being replaced by Boeing 737s in 1976.

=== Development since the 1980s ===
Building up the airline from scratch, ten years later Transavia had a marketshare of 45% of the Dutch holiday market and became the main competitor of Martinair. In 1986, the Transavia Holland brand was changed into Transavia Airlines. It was the first airline to take advantage of the first open skies agreement signed between the UK and Dutch governments. Transavia started operating its first scheduled service on the Amsterdam to London Gatwick route on 26 October 1986. In 1992, Transavia was operating codeshared flights between Amsterdam and London Gatwick on behalf of Continental Airlines with these services providing passenger feed for Continental nonstop flights between London and New York City (via Newark Airport), Houston and Denver.

During 1991, the airline's major shareholder, Nedlloyd, sold its 80% holding to KLM. In 1998, Transavia was the first foreign airline to operate domestic services in Greece following a change in Greek aviation law. In June 2003, KLM acquired the remaining 20% of Transavia, making it 100% KLM owned. The subsequent merger of Air France and KLM made Transavia a wholly owned subsidiary of Air France-KLM.

In the early 2000s, Transavia was primarily a charter airline with a low-cost airline subsidiary called Basiq Air. To strengthen its brand image, the two were combined under the transavia.com domain name on 1 January 2005.

Transavia had a French unit, Transavia France, based at Paris-Orly, but it is now fully owned by Air France–KLM too. A Danish unit, Transavia Denmark, based at Copenhagen, operated from 2008 until April 2011 when it was shut down after failing to meet expectations.

A strike was organised by Air France pilots in September 2014, in protest against the Air France-KLM group's increased focus on the development of Transavia, whose pilots were being paid less than those of Air France.

By early 2015, Transavia received a new corporate design dropping the ".com" from its public appearance and changed its primary colors from white/green/blue to white/green. The airline is now to be positioned as Air France-KLM's low-cost brand for the Netherlands and France.

In February 2017, Transavia announced that it would shut down its base at Munich Airport by late October 2017 after only a year of service due to a change in their business strategy and negative economic outlook.

In December 2019, Transavia announced the launch of its base at Brussels Airport, initially operating nine routes from the airport.

In December 2021, after a delay due to the coronavirus, the base at Brussels Airport was opened. Transavia will station one aircraft at the Belgian airport.

=== Post-COVID developments and fleet renewal ===
Like other leisure airlines, Transavia was greatly impacted by the outbreak of the COVID-19 epidemic, and the worldwide travel disruptions that followed. Transavia noted a loss of 299 million euros in 2020. From 2021 onwards, the airline gradually started to recover from the crisis, as international air travel started to recover again.

In December 2021, Transavia announced that the fleet is to be renewed with Airbus A320neo family aircraft. Together with its parent company Air France-KLM, an order was placed for 100 aircraft with 60 additional options. On 19 December 2023, the first Airbus A321neo aircraft was delivered which entered service with the airline some days later.

In early September 2026, Air France-KLM announced the appointment of Oltion Carkaxhija as CEO of Transavia.

== Corporate affairs ==
=== Head office ===
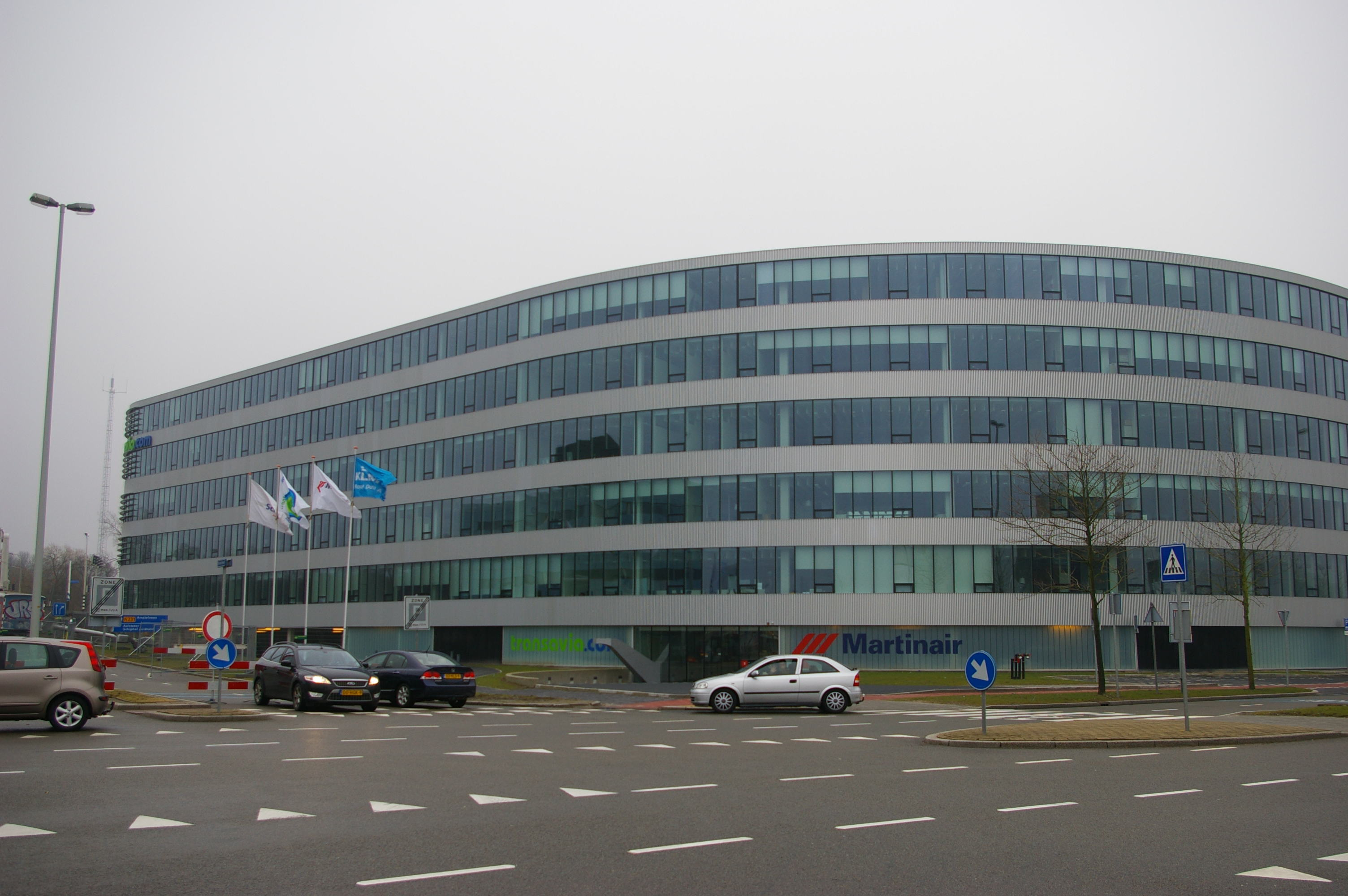
The TransPort Building housed the head offices of Transavia and Martinair from 2010 to 2026.

Logo during the Transavia Airlines branding

Logo during the transavia.com branding

Since 24 August 2026, Transavia's head office has been located in The AVE office building at Scorpius 1-41 in Hoofddorp, Netherlands, adjacent to Hoofddorp railway station.

Prior to the move, Transavia had its head office in the TransPort Building at Schiphol East, on the grounds of Amsterdam Airport Schiphol, Haarlemmermeer, Netherlands. Transavia moved into the TransPort Building on 3 May 2010 with about 400 employees. Previously the head office was located in the Triport III building at Schiphol Airport.

=== Ownership and structure ===
Transavia Airlines B.V. is 100% owned by KLM, which in turn is owned by Air France-KLM; however, Transavia is run as an independent operation. It holds a 4.49% interest in the French airline Transavia France (the remaining 95.51% is owned by Air France), which operates in the French market. Transavia France also operates under the brand name of Transavia, with an identical business model, website, and image.

=== Business model ===
Transavia operates as a low-cost carrier with a single class of cabin. The airline offers the "Selection on Board" buy on board service offering food and drinks for purchase. Commencing 5 April 2011, Transavia introduced fees for hold luggage and changed the rules for hand luggage, with the maximum allowable weight for hand luggage increased from 5 to 10 kg (11 to 22 lb).

=== Business trends ===
The financials for both parts of the Transavia brand (Transavia Netherlands and Transavia France) are fully incorporated in the published annual accounts of their ultimate parent, Air France-KLM. Results reported for the Transavia brand are (figures for financial years ending 31 December):

	Turnover (Note: "passenger revenues" / "Total sales") (€m)	Net profit/loss (€m)	Number of passengers (m)	Passenger load factor (%)	Number of aircraft (Transavia)	Number of aircraft (Transavia France)	Number of aircraft (total) (Note: at year end)	Notes/ sources
2011		−5	6.3	86.5	30	8	38	
2012	889	−1	7.6	88.6	31	8	39	
2013	984	−23	8.9	90.1	30	11	41	
2014	1,056	−36	9.9	89.8	31	14	45	
2015	1,100	−35	10.8	89.9	32	21	53	
2016	1,218	0	13.2	89.2	37	26	63	
2017	1,436	81	14.8	90.6	39	29	73	
2018	1,611	139	15.8	92.0	40	34	74	
2019	1,744	131	16.6	92.2	42	38	80	
2020	606	−299	5.2	73.8	40	40	80	
2021	1,012	−149	8.8	74.7	39	54	93	
2022	2,219	−104	18.3	85.2	39	60	99	
2023	2,640	−96	21.4	89.1	45	72	117	
2024	3,072	3			47	79	126	
2025	3,452	−49	26.0	87.4	49	91	140	

In 2013 and 2015, Transavia had 2,050 and 2,400 employees, respectively.

== Destinations ==
Countries in which Transavia (NL) operates as of March 2026

=== Codeshare agreements ===
Transavia has codeshare agreements with the following airlines:

- Air France
- Delta Air Lines
- KLM

== Fleet ==
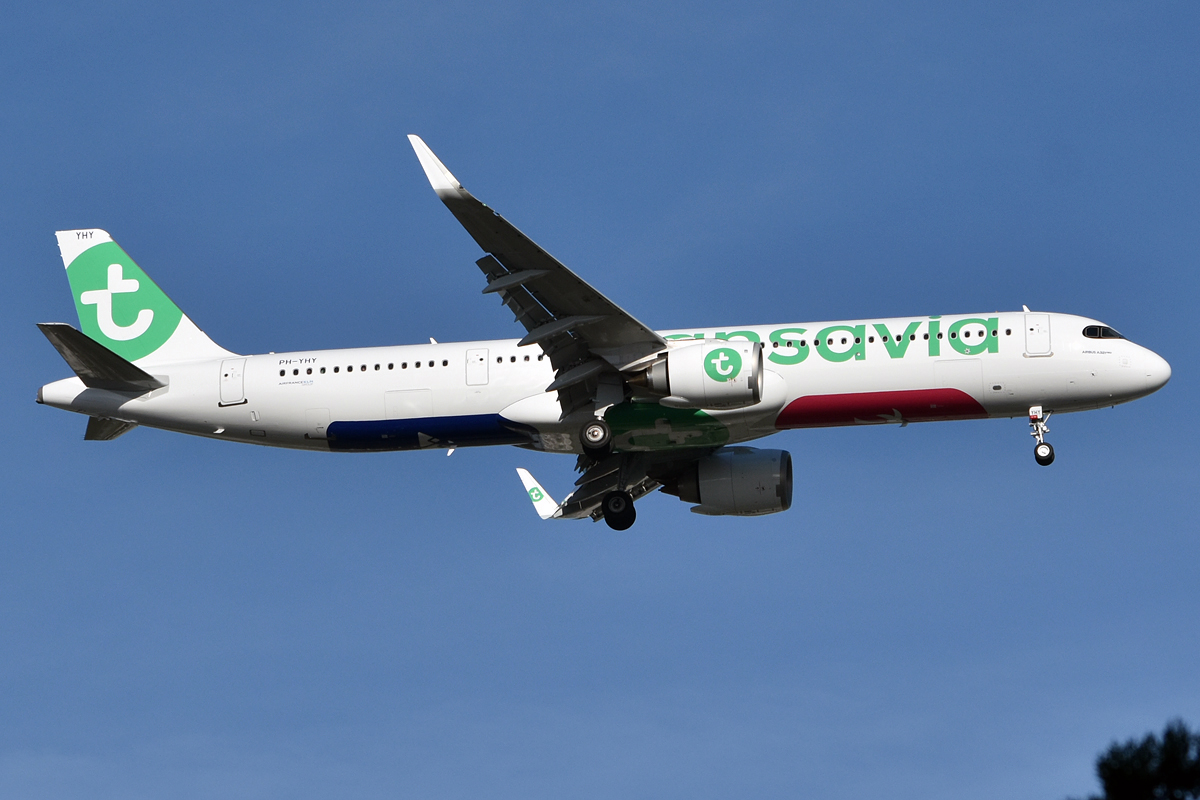
Transavia Airbus A321neo

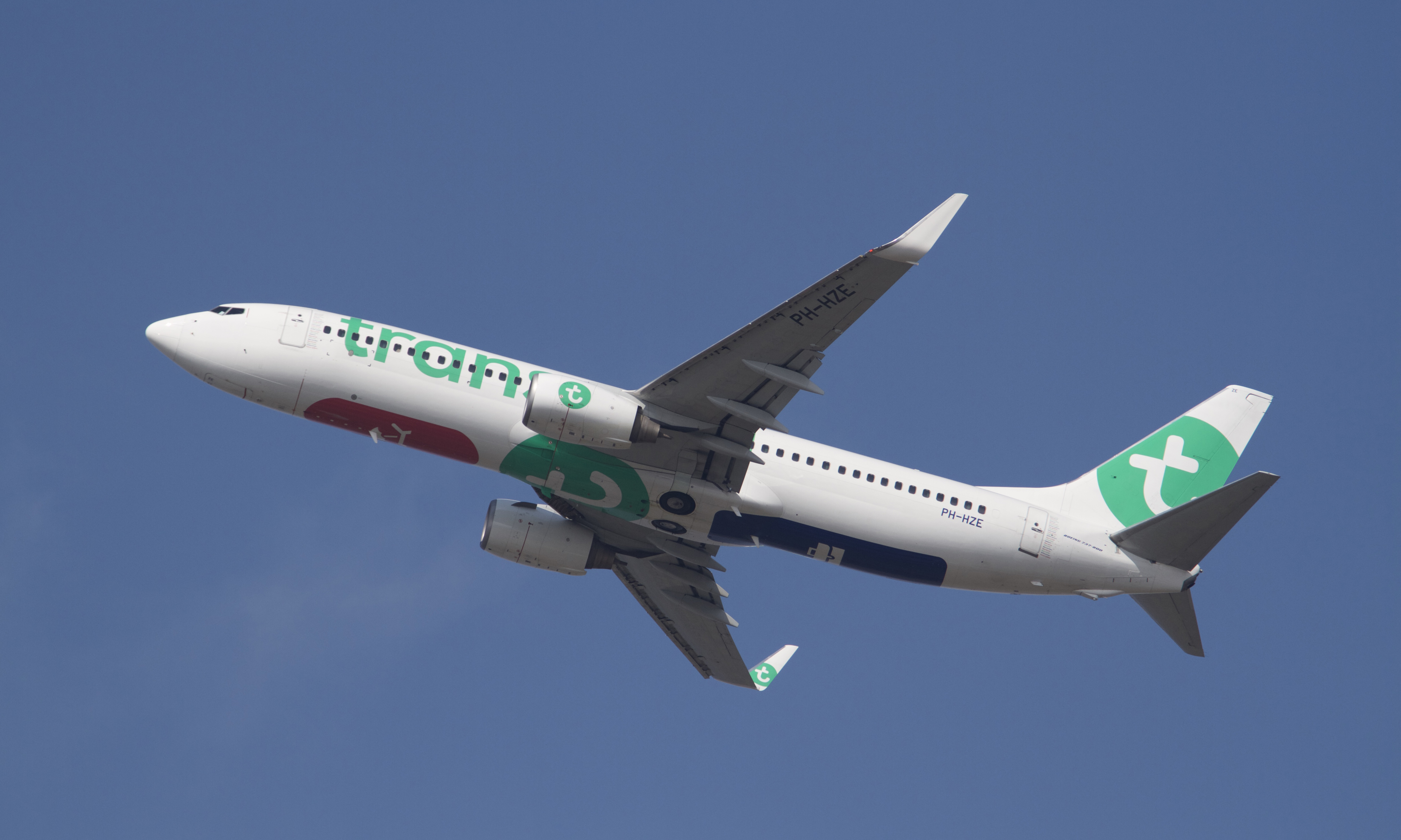
Transavia Boeing 737-800 wearing the former livery introduced in 2015

=== Current fleet ===
As of October 2026, Transavia operates the following aircraft:

Transavia fleet
Aircraft type	In service	Orders	Passengers	Notes
Airbus A320neo	—	1	186	First delivery expected April 2027
Airbus A321neo	19	4	232	Deliveries ongoing. To replace Boeing 737-800
Boeing 737-800	33	—	189	To be replaced by Airbus A320neo family.
Total	52	5		

=== Fleet development ===
Previously, during the busy summer season, Transavia would regularly lease additional 737 aircraft from Sun Country Airlines, a US airline based in Eagan, Minnesota. During the slower winter season, which corresponds to Sun Country's busy season, Sun Country leases several planes from Transavia. A similar agreement was also made with the Brazilian, Rio de Janeiro based low-cost airline Gol Linhas Aéreas Inteligentes (GOL Airlines). This reciprocal arrangement allows both airlines to balance their fleets to reflect seasonal demand. These agreements, however, seem to have been terminated around the year 2020, based on the fleet activity of the airlines. Transavia does, in the present day, when needed, wet-lease aircraft to operate on their behalf if they are unable to meet the capacity demand at the time. The most common reasons for Transavia to have to wet-lease is that several aircraft are grounded (AOG) due to unscheduled maintenance usually related to damage incurred during ground handling or scheduled maintenance which takes longer than expected. These issues often also result in the airline needing to cancel several flights.

Transavia has mainly operated models of the Boeing 737 family throughout its history. However, on December 16, 2021, Air France-KLM announced that it had placed an order for 100 aircraft of the Airbus A320neo family, with options for 60 additional aircraft. These will be replacing the entire Boeing 737 fleet of Transavia, Transavia France, and KLM.

== Accidents and incidents ==
No fatalities or complete loss of aircraft have occurred on Transavia flights. In 1997 two incidents occurred with substantial damage to the aircraft:

- On 8 February 1997, Transavia Airlines Flight 484, a Boeing 737-300 flying from Salzburg to Amsterdam, was damaged en route. The push/pull rod of the elevator broke off, damaging the Boeing 737's rudder, and an emergency landing was made at Nuremberg Airport. There were no fatalities, but the FAA issued an Airworthiness Directive after this and a similar incident.
- On 24 December 1997, Transavia Airlines Flight 462, a Boeing 757-200 flying from Gran Canaria to Amsterdam, was seriously damaged during landing. The aircraft landed in strong, gusty winds and touched down hard with its right main gear first. On touchdown the nose gear doghouse collapsed, inflicting serious damage on some electrical and electronic systems and control cables. After sliding over the runway for approximately 3 km (1.9 mi), the aircraft came to rest in the grass beside the runway. The plane was evacuated successfully, and no fatalities or serious injuries occurred. The aircraft returned to service after repairs.

== See also ==
- Transavia Denmark
- Transavia France
