= Saint-Sulpice-de-Roumagnac =

- Commune
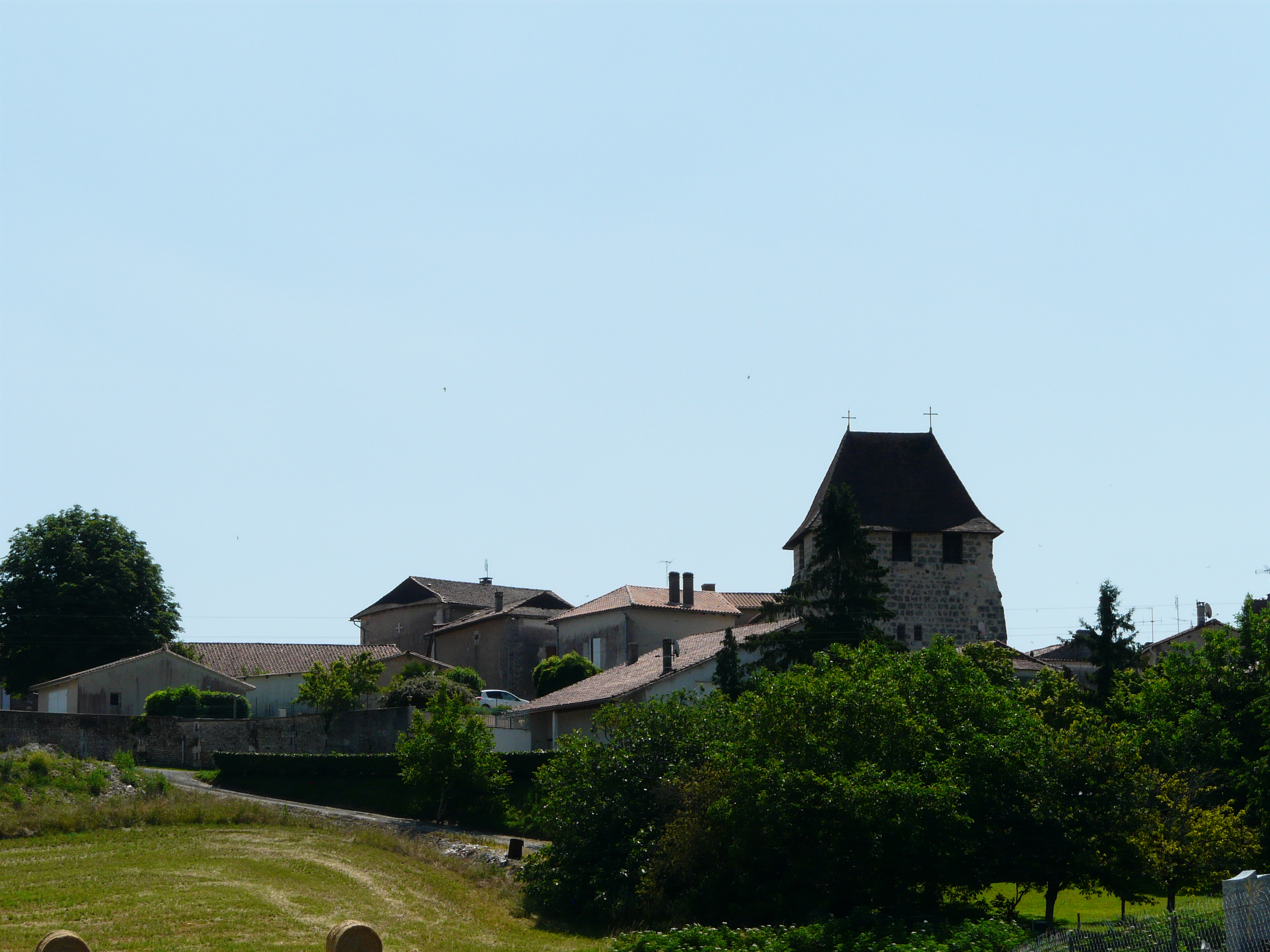
- A general view of Saint-Sulpice-de-Roumagnac

- Coat of arms
- Location of Saint-Sulpice-de-Roumagnac
- Location within France Location within Nouvelle-Aquitaine
- Coordinates: 45°12′21″N 0°23′42″E
- Country: France
- Region: Nouvelle-Aquitaine
- Department: Dordogne
- Arrondissement: Périgueux
- Canton: Ribérac

Government
  - Mayor (2020–2026): Philippe Dubourg
- Area^{1}: 10.7 km^{2} (4.1 sq mi)
- Elevation: 170 m (560 ft)
- Highest elevation: 209 m (686 ft)
- Lowest elevation: 85 m (279 ft)
- Population (2023): 279
  - Density: 26.1/km^{2} (67.5/sq mi)
- Time zone: UTC+01:00 (CET)
  - Summer (DST): UTC+02:00 (CEST)
- INSEE/Postal code: 24504 /24600
- ^{1} French Land Register data, which excludes lakes, ponds, glaciers > 1 km^{2} (0.386 sq mi or 247 acres) and river estuaries.

Saint-Sulpice-de-Roumagnac (French pronunciation: [sɛ̃ sylpis də ʁumaɲak]; Occitan: Sent Soplesí de Romanhac) is a commune in the Dordogne department in Nouvelle-Aquitaine in southwestern France.

== Population ==
Historical population
Year	Pop.	±% p.a.
1968	305	—
1975	238	−3.48%
1982	242	+0.24%
1990	232	−0.53%
1999	226	−0.29%
2007	216	−0.56%
2012	239	+2.04%
2017	279	+3.14%
2023	279	+0.00%
Source: INSEE

== See also ==
- Communes of the Dordogne department
