= Air France–KLM =

Franco-Dutch multinational airline holding company

Air France–KLM S.A.
- Type: Public
- Traded as: Euronext Paris: AF; CAC Mid 60 component
- ISIN: FR001400J770
- Industry: Aviation
- Predecessor: Air France; KLM
- Founded: 5 May 2004; 22 years ago
- Headquarters: Paris, France
- Key people: Florence Parly (chairwoman); Benjamin Smith (CEO)
- Revenue: ▲€33.007 billion (2025)
- Operating income: ▲€2.002 billion (2025)
- Net income: ▲€1.754 billion (2025)
- Total assets: ▲€3.445 billion (2025)
- Owners: French state (28.6%); Dutch state (9.3%); CMA CGM (9%); China Eastern Airlines (4.7%); Delta Air Lines (2.9%)
- Number of employees: 81,992 (2025)
- Subsidiaries: See § Subsidiaries.
- Website: www.airfranceklm.com

Air France–KLM S.A., also known as Air France–KLM Group (stylised as AIRFRANCEKLM GROUP), is a French–Dutch multinational airline holding company with its headquarters in the Rue du Cirque, Paris, France. The group's three major brands are Air France, KLM and Transavia. Air France–KLM is the result of the merger in 2004 between Air France and KLM. Both Air France and KLM are members of the SkyTeam airline alliance. The group's main hubs are Paris–Charles de Gaulle Airport, Paris Orly Airport and Amsterdam Airport Schiphol. Air France–KLM airlines transported 83 million passengers in 2022.

== History ==
=== 2004: Founding ===
On 5 May 2004, Air France–KLM was created by the mutually agreed merger between Air France and Netherlands-based KLM. As a result of the deal, the French government's share of Air France was reduced from 54.4% (of the former Air France) to 44% (of the combined airline). Its share was subsequently reduced to 25%, and later to 17.6%. At the time of the merger in May 2004, Air France and KLM combined offered flights to 225 destinations in the world. In the year ending 21 March 2003, the two companies combined transported 66.3 million passengers.

In October 2005, Air France Cargo and KLM Cargo, the two freight subsidiaries of the group, merged their commercial activities. The Joint Cargo Management Team now operates the organisation worldwide from the Netherlands.

In a 2007 opening for a majority takeover of the loss-generating Alitalia, Air France–KLM was one of three bidders, and was favoured by the board of Alitalia. However, on 2 April 2008, it was reported that negotiations have been abandoned. After the acquisition of Alitalia and Air One by Compagnia Aerea Italiana on 12 December 2008, Air France–KLM was interested once again in purchasing a participation in the new merged company. On 12 January 2009, Air France–KLM bought a 25% share in this company for €323 million.

In 2008, it was the largest airline company in the world in terms of total operating revenues, and also the largest in the world in terms of international passenger-kilometres.

=== 2010: Japan Airlines bid ===
Air France–KLM, along with its partner Delta Air Lines, were in talks about investing with Japan Airlines, which is part of the Oneworld alliance (rival to SkyTeam) but was experiencing financial problems. Air France–KLM, along with Delta and Delta's rival, American Airlines (AMR Corporation, part of Oneworld), discussed investments of $200–300 million to help the financially struggling carrier, which is Asia's largest airline by revenue. The Ministry of Land, Infrastructure, Transport and Tourism of Japan had recommended Air France–KLM and/or Delta for partners because of their "healthy" financial status, compared to AMR Corporation. Delta was also recommended because of its extensive Asian network, acquired through the acquisition of Northwest Airlines. Korean Air, also a SkyTeam member, was also in talks with JAL. Air France, Alitalia, China Airlines, China Southern Airlines, Korean Air, and Vietnam Airlines are SkyTeam members that currently have code-sharing with JAL. On 7 February 2010, several news outlets reported that JAL decided to keep its alliance with American Airlines and end talks with Delta. According to reports, new JAL CEO Inamori and ETIC officials, decided that switching alliances (from Oneworld to SkyTeam) would be too risky and could hinder JAL's ability to turn around the airline quickly. On 9 February 2010, JAL officially announced their decision to strengthen its partnership with American, which included the joint application of antitrust immunity approval on transpacific routes. The airline also planned to fortify its relationship with other partners in the Oneworld alliance.

=== 2010–2019: Stability ===
In February 2011, Air France–KLM and Delta Air Lines were working together to examine a bid for Virgin Atlantic as Richard Branson had a 51 percent stake and the rest is held by Delta.

In August 2011, Air France–KLM was categorised as one of World's 10 safest airlines.

In December 2013, Air France–KLM sold its subsidiary CityJet to Intro Aviation.

In early April 2016, Alexandre de Juniac, Chairman and CEO since 1 July 2013 resigned and was replaced by Jean-Marc Janaillac on 4 July 2016.

In January 2018, before the French Senate, Jean-Marc Janaillac reported for 2017 a higher revenue due to a rising fleet utilisation and a faster growth to come, and a better operating profit with 6% for the group (Air France 4%, KLM 9%) but lagging the 9% of Lufthansa and 10 to 12% of British Airways, while he deplored Paris-Charles de Gaulle luggage handling and safety waiting lines, obstructing connections, and anticipating a difficult 2018 with rising jet fuel prices and competition from Gulf carriers, Turkish Airlines, Chinese and Asian airlines, and low-cost carriers, either easyJet, Volotea, Ryanair or long haul.

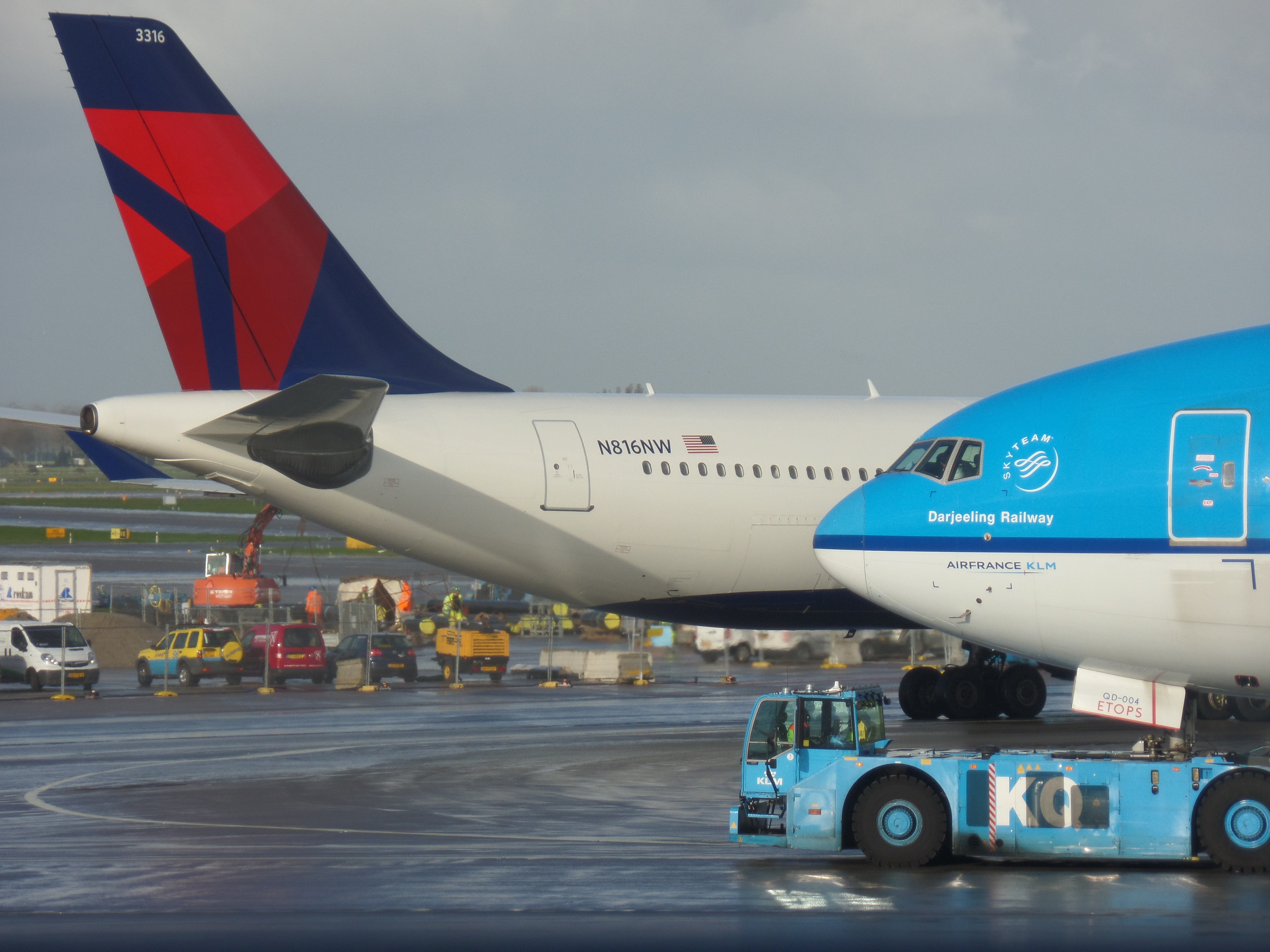
Delta and KLM aircraft at Schiphol

At the end of 2018, Air France–KLM will select its medium-haul fleet replacement for Air France, HOP!, KLM and Transavia, operating 120 Boeing 737 NG, 118 Airbus A320ceo family, 64 Embraer E-Jets, 25 Bombardier CRJ700 series and 13 Embraer E145 aircraft. After renewing its long-haul fleet with the 787 Dreamliner and the A350 XWB from 2019, specifications will be released in the first trimester, seeking proposals from Airbus, Boeing, Bombardier Aerospace and Embraer, aiming for lower aircraft noise and biofuel usage.

On 4 May 2018, Jean-Marc Janaillac announced that he will be resigning as CEO of Air France–KLM, after employees rejected new salary package.

On 16 August 2018, the Board of Directors of Air France–KLM announced the appointment of Benjamin Smith as new CEO. He took up his duties at Air France–KLM on 30 September 2018.

On 26 February 2019, the Dutch government announced that it had "purchased 12.68 percent of shares in Air France–KLM" and "plans to build up its stake to around 14 percent".

=== 2022–2024: CMA CGM alliance, Scandinavian Airlines investment ===
In May 2022, Air France–KLM signed a strategic partnership with CMA CGM to develop their air cargo capacities together. CMA CGM is the parent company of CMA CGM Air Cargo which was founded in 2021. As part of the agreement CMA CGM acquired a 9% stake in Air France–KLM; however, this agreement was terminated by mutual agreement in January 2024 without change in the capital structure of the group.

On 12 July 2023, Air France–KLM announced a 10-for-1 reverse stock split and an ISIN change on 31 August 2023.

In October 2023, Air France–KLM, the Danish state and two investment firms (Castlelake and Lind Invest) announced plans to invest in SAS Group (the parent company of Scandinavian Airlines) following the airline company's Chapter 11 process in the United States, with the carrier taking 19.9% stake. In March 2024, the US Bankruptcy Court approved the restructuring plan that would allow SAS to exit Chapter 11 proceedings with approval from the European Commission following on 28 June 2024. Following the approval for the investment, SAS exited Star Alliance on 31 August 2024, and joined SkyTeam on 1 September 2024

On 4 July 2025, Air France–KLM announced its intention to increase its stake in SAS's share capital from 19.9% to 60.5%, taking over Castlelake and Lind Invest's stakes in the company. Pending approval from competition authorities, Air France–KLM expect SAS to become a subsidiary in the Air France–KLM Group, where the Danish Ministry of Finance will retain its minority stake of approximately 26% in the subsidiary. This move was not unexpected as already in 2023, Air France–KLM announced the ambition to become a controlling stakeholder after a minimum of 2 years.

== Corporate affairs ==
=== Business trends ===
In May 2010, Air France–KLM announced increased losses (€1.56 billion for the year to 31 March 2010), and warned that the 2010 eruptions of Eyjafjallajökull had caused a further €160 million loss in the current financial year. Air France–KLM is one of the largest airline companies in Europe, with 204.7 billion passenger-km in the year ending 31 March 2011.

Private shareholders own 81.4% of the company with 37% held by former Air France shareholders and 21% held by former KLM shareholders. The Government of France owns the remaining 15.9%.

In June 2008, Air France–KLM agreed to pay $350 million to settle charges of cargo price fixing in an investigation conducted by the U.S. Justice Department. Cathay Pacific, Martinair Holland, and SAS Cargo Group also agreed to fines bringing the total to $504 million. In November 2010, the European Commission fined Air France–KLM €310 million following another price-fixing investigation.

The company spends about a third of its revenue on staff, its biggest expense, while Lufthansa only spends around a quarter, so to save around 800 million euros (app. 1.04 billion US$) annually over the next three years, the company will make a recruitment freeze which will lead to 2,000 job cuts in 2012.

In February 2014, Air France–KLM invested $100 million in Brazilian airline Gol Linhas Aéreas Inteligentes in advance of the 2014 football World Cup.

During 2015, Air France went through a severe business crisis and a pilot's strike, which made the French airline cut almost 3,000 jobs, KLM defer some of its pending 787 deliveries, KLM's cargo subsidiary Martinair to retire six McDonnell-Douglas MD-11 airplanes, and Air France–KLM to suffer as a company.

=== Ownership ===
As of December 2024, the shareholding structure of the group is:

Shareholder	Interest
French State	27.98%
Dutch State	9.13%
CMA CGM	8.80%
China Eastern Airlines	4.58%
Delta Air Lines	2.79%
Employees (FCPE)	3.08%
Air France - KLM Pilot Shares Foundation	0.85%
Other investors	42.74%

=== Head office ===
Air France–KLM's head office is located in the Roissypôle complex on the grounds of Charles de Gaulle Airport and in Tremblay-en-France, near Paris. The 130,000-square-metre (1,400,000 sq ft) complex was completed in December 1995. The French firm Groupement d'Etudes et de Méthodes d'Ordonnancement (GEMO) managed the project. The architect was Valode & Pistre and the design consultants were Sechaud-Boyssut and Trouvin. The project amounted to a cost of 137,000,000 euros.

=== Flying Blue ===
Flying Blue is the frequent flyer program of the Air France-KLM Group and is utilized by its two primary airlines, Air France and KLM. In addition to KLM and Air France, other airlines that have adopted the Flying Blue program include Air Corsica, Transavia, Aircalin, Winair and TAROM. Scandinavian Airlines is also expected to adopt Flying Blue when its acquisition by the group is complete.

On Flying Blue, awards miles are earned based on the distance travelled, ticket fare and class of service. Membership in the program is free. When flying, members earn Experience Points (XP) and Award Miles.

Experience Points are used to determine membership level and remain valid until the end of the qualification period, which lasts for 1 year from counting from the member's first flight. XP can be earned with KLM, Air France, Transavia, Aircalin, TAROM, and other SkyTeam partners. The Flying Blue programme is divided into four tiers: Explorer, Silver (SkyTeam Elite), Gold (SkyTeam Elite Plus) and Platinum (SkyTeam Elite Plus). The membership tier depends on the number of Experience Points earned and is recalculated each qualification period. Flying Blue privileges are additive by membership tier; higher tiers include all benefits listed for prior tiers. There is an additional fifth tier, Platinum for Life, which can be obtained after 10 consecutive years of Platinum membership. After the Platinum for Life status is obtained, re-qualification is not required.

Award Miles can be exchanged for rewards and expire after 24 months of inactivity. Award Miles can be earned on flights with SkyTeam member airlines as well as on other Flying Blue partners including Air Corsica, Air Mauritius, airBaltic, Aircalin, Bangkok Airways, Chalair Aviation, China Southern Airlines, Copa Airlines, Gol Transportes Aéreos, Japan Airlines, Malaysia Airlines, Qantas, Transavia, Twin Jet, WestJet and Winair. Award Miles are redeemable for free tickets, upgrades to a more expensive seating class, extra baggage allowance, wifi on board, and lounge access. They can also be donated to various charities, or can be spent in the Flying Blue Store. Award tickets are sold in three types: Light, Standard, and Flex mirroring the fares available on standard tickets although itineraries which include partner airlines that are not part of the group will always be ticketed using the Standard fare.

In June 2022, Brim Financial announced it will launch an Air France-KLM co-branded credit card in Canada.

== Subsidiaries ==
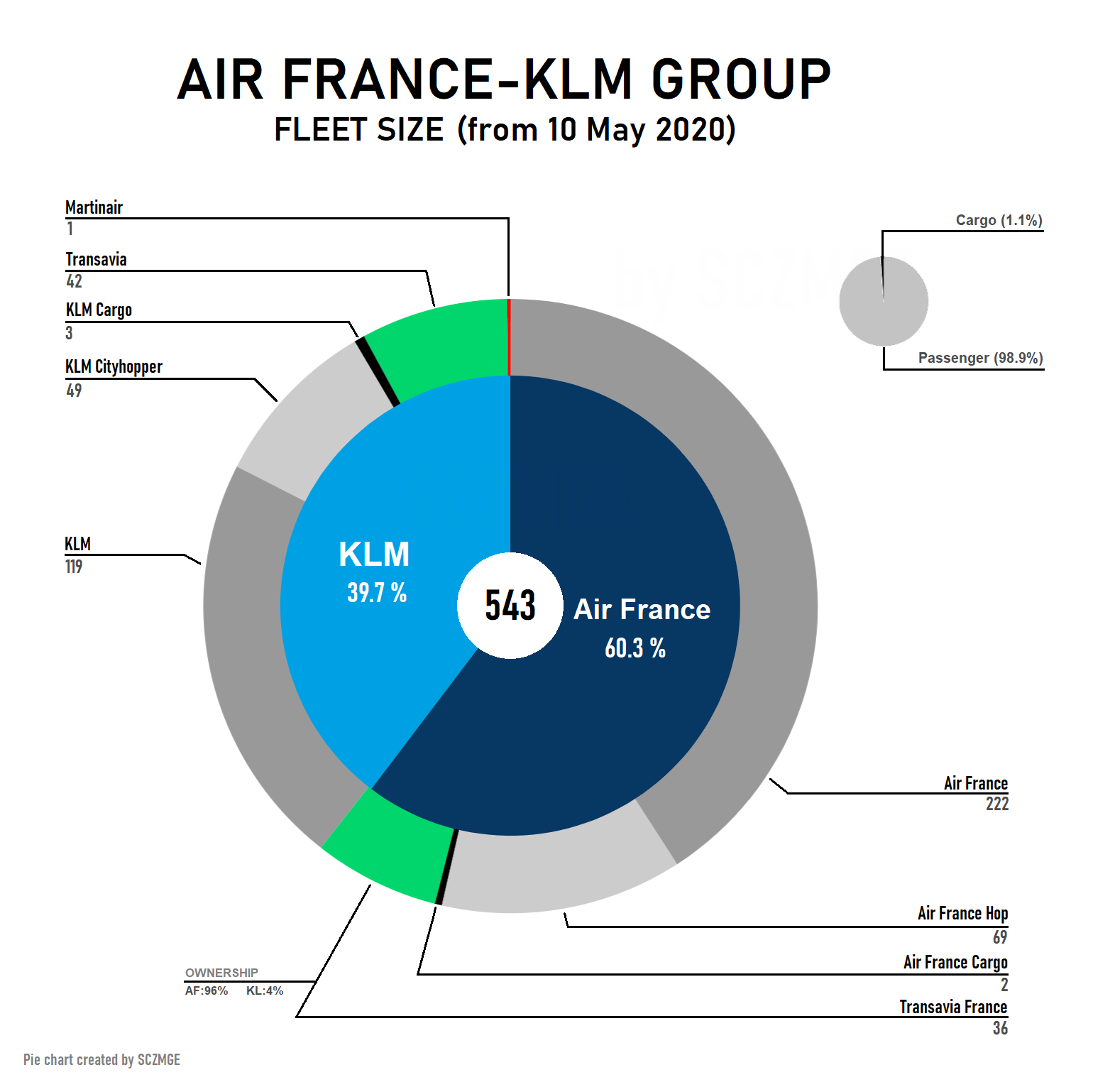
Fleet size of Air France–KLM Group (May 2020)

=== Wholly owned ===
Wholly owned subsidiaries of Air France–KLM include:

- Air France
  - Air France Cargo
  - Air France Hop
  - Transavia France (Air France 96%, Transavia 4%)
  - Air France Industries
- KLM
  - KLM Cargo
  - KLM Cityhopper
  - KLM Asia
  - Martinair
  - Transavia
  - KLM Engineering and Maintenance (KLM E&M) – Including UK Engineering

Until January 2017, Air France–KLM also fully owned Cobalt Ground Solutions the third largest ground handling company based at London Heathrow Airport. The company was formed on 1 April 2009 by merging the two ground services subsidiaries of Air France and KLM in the UK – formerly Air France Services Ltd (AFSL) and KLM Ground Services Ltd (KGS). Cobalt Ground Solutions was sold to Groupe CRIT, who purchased 100% of the company through its subsidiary Groupe Europe Handling.

Air France Services Ltd (AFSL) was one of the major ground handling companies at Heathrow airport. AFSL was created on 15 January 1997 and was in the beginning a partnership between Air France and Servisair Ltd. Servisair then decided to pull out.

The group also owns Cygnific which is one of the biggest Sales & Service Centres of Air France–KLM. Cygnific is a full subsidiary of KLM Royal Dutch Airlines, operating as an independent company with its own business strategy, operational processes and human resources policy. Cygnific serves passengers and travel agents on behalf of KLM, Air France and Delta Air Lines.

=== Minority interests ===
Airlines in which Air France–KLM owns a minority interest:

- Air Calédonie (2.1%), share held by Air France.
- Air Corsica (11.95%)
- Air Côte d'Ivoire (20%)
- Air Mauritius (2.78%)
- Air Tahiti (7.48%)
- Kenya Airways (7.95%)
- Gol Transportes Aéreos (1.19%)
- Royal Air Maroc (1.25%)
- Scandinavian Airlines (19.9%)
- WestJet (2.3%)

=== Former subsidiaries ===
- Air France Asie
- CityJet — Air France–KLM used to own the entire company, until the sale to Intro Aviation, a German aviation holding company.
- KLM Alps
- KLM Exel
- KLM UK
- VLM Airlines — Air France–KLM merged the operations of this company with the ones from Cityjet. It was sold at the same time.
- Joon — Air France–KLM merged the company back into Air France in June 2019
- NS International (formerly NS Hispeed and High Speed Alliance) — An alliance with Nederlandse Spoorwegen that gained the concession to operate the HSL-Zuid. KLM held a stake of 10%, which was reduced to 5%. The alliance was terminated in 2015 and operations of the HSL-Zuid merged with the domestic operations of Nederlandse Spoorwegen.
