= F28 =

F28, F-28 or F.28 may refer to:

== Aircraft ==
- Enstrom F-28, a helicopter
- Fokker F28 Fellowship, a Dutch commercial passenger jet produced between 1967 and 1987

== Ships and boats ==
- Corsair F-28 a US trimaran sailboat design
- BNS Somudra Joy (F-28), a Bangladesh Navy frigate
- HMS Artifex (F28), a United Kingdom Royal Navy repair ship which served between 1939 and 1961
- HMS Cleopatra (F28), a United Kingdom Royal Navy frigate which served between 1964 and 1991
- HMS Kandahar (F28), a 1939 United Kingdom Royal Navy destroyer which saw service during World War II

== Other uses ==
- Getrag F28/6 transmission, installed on the Opel Calibra car
- F-28 (Michigan county highway), a road in the United States
- Fluorine-28 (F-28 or ^{28}F), an isotope of fluorine
