= Buy on board =

Food or beverages purchased in-flight

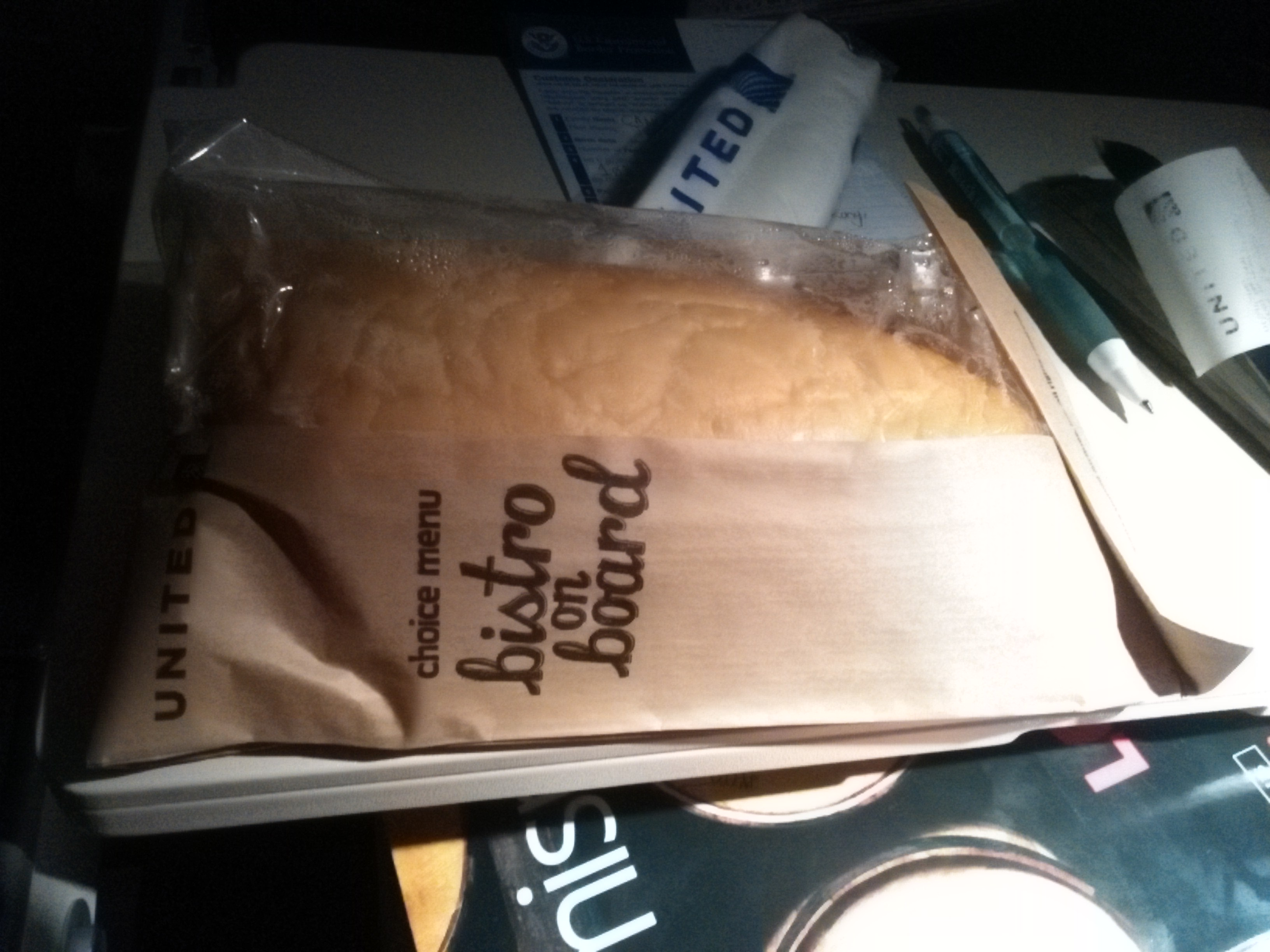
A United Airlines Bistro on Board sandwich

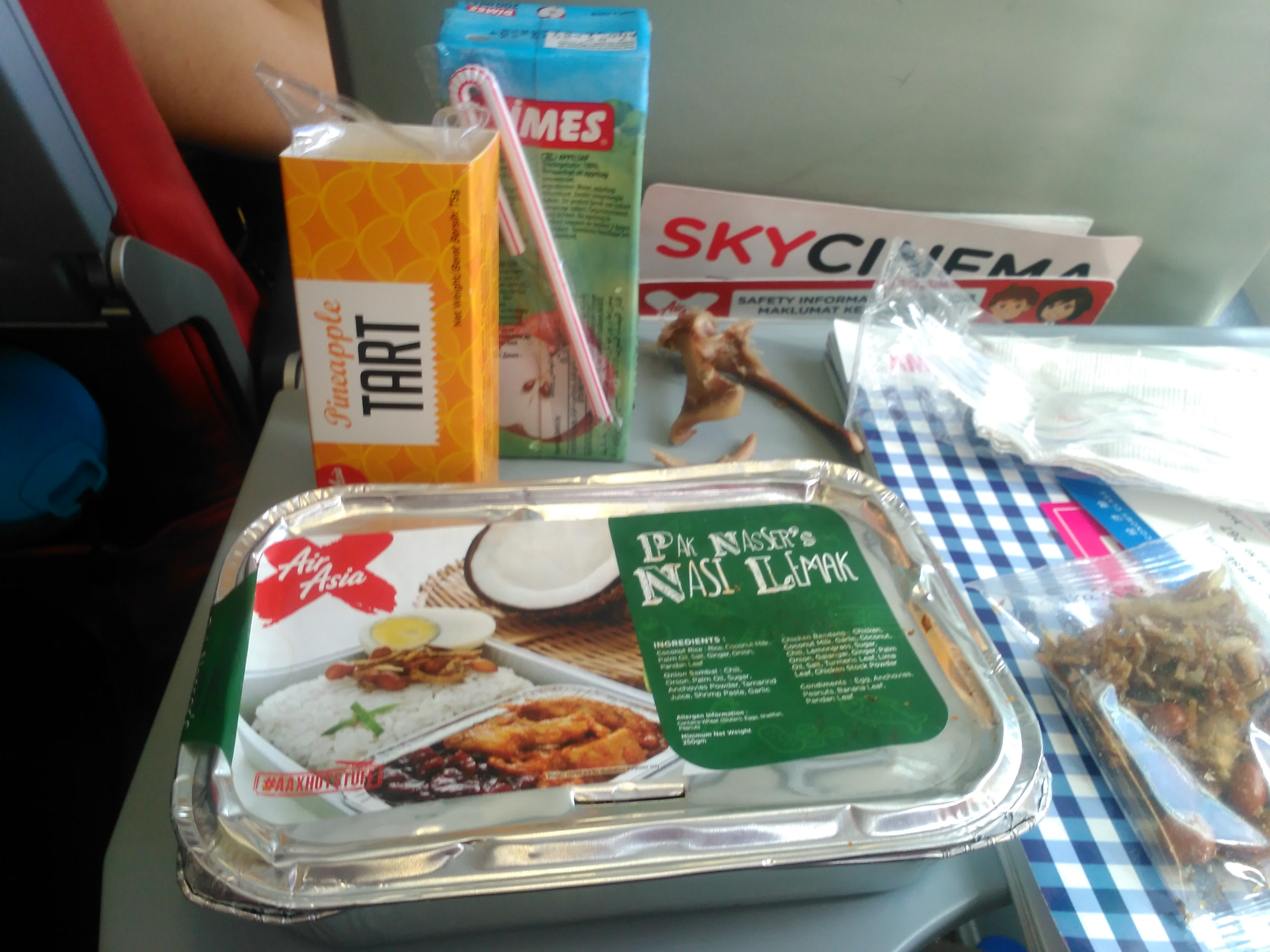
An Air Asia X Pak Nasser's nasi lemak box

In commercial aviation, buy on board (BoB) is a system in which in-flight food or beverages are not included in the ticket price but are purchased on board or ordered in advance as an optional extra during or after the booking process. Some airlines, including almost all low-cost carriers and a handful of flag carriers, have buy-on-board food and beverages as part of their ancillary revenue generation.

== United States ==
As the airline market in the United States became deregulated, airlines began to compete by price. Airline ticket prices began to decrease, and airlines began to charge extra for services that had been included in the airfare.

Starting in 2003, many United States air carriers began eliminating free meal services in economy classes on North American flights and replacing them with buy on board services. In the 2000s US Airways (now part of American Airlines) briefly charged for soft drinks but then reversed course. By 2009, many US carriers had established buy on board as part of an à la carte pricing movement. Around that year, US carriers began using celebrity-named and brand name products to make their buy on board products generate more revenue. Continental Airlines, the last large United States carrier to offer free meals on all domestic flights, announced in March 2010 that it would begin a buy on board program in fall 2010 and end many of its free meal programs on domestic flights. Jeff Green of Businessweek described the end of Continental's program as an "end of an era."

In the United States, passengers increasingly began to bring their own foods on board to avoid paying for buy on board.

As of 2016, Hawaiian Airlines remains the last U.S. legacy airline to offer free meals on board, but most of its flights are to/from Hawaii. Southwest Airlines and Avelo Airlines are the only mainland U.S. airlines without a buy-on-board program as of 2026.

Today, all three major U.S. airlines now offer free snacks in economy on board their flights, in addition to their buy-on-board menus.

== Europe ==
In Europe, the general increase in the number of tourists that fly, and deregulation which enabled low price carriers, has caused stiffer price competition. Low cost carriers, such as Ryanair, which charges for all food or drink, have forced traditional airlines to lower their costs. As of 2025 only 3 out of the 21 most popular airlines in Europe offered complimentary inflight food and drink. Air France, ITA Airways, KLM, and Lot Polish Airlines all continued to offer free snacks and beverages on their short-haul flights.

== See also ==
- LSG Sky Chefs
- Duty-free shop
