= List of Air France destinations =

Air France flies to 29 domestic destinations and 201 international destinations in 94 countries across Africa, Americas, Asia, Europe and Oceania as of September 2022.

== History ==
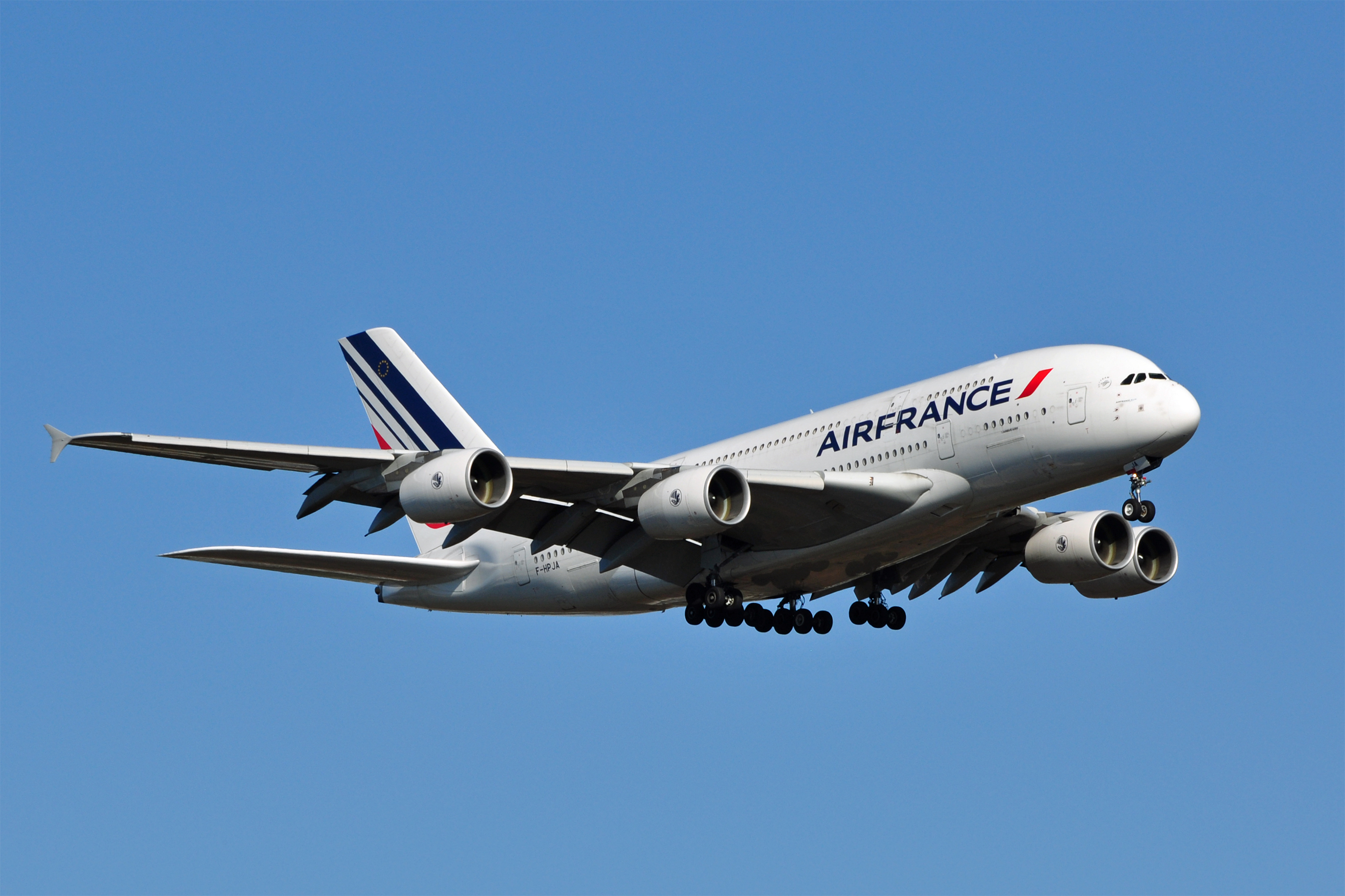
Air France flight AF 028 landing in 2011 at Washington Dulles International Airport in Virginia, US

Air France was founded on 7 October 1933 as a merger of several French aviation companies. The network started with destinations across Europe, to French colonies in North Africa and farther afield. The 1937 route map shows European, African and Asian routes. In 1946, the network covered 160,000 km, claimed to be the longest in the world. The Paris-New York line (a 19h50 flight on a DC4) was first served on 1 July 1946, departing from Le Bourget Airport. Starting from March 1950, the Asian destinations (Paris-Saigon) were served with the Lockheed Constellation (L 049), which needed only 33 hours (versus more than 60 hours with the DC 4). In 1952, the departures moved to the Paris Orly-Sud airport and the network extended 250,000 km. Los Angeles and Rio de Janeiro started to be served directly in the jet age of the 1960s. In 1983, Air France served 150 destinations in 73 countries, forming a network of 634,400 km.

== List ==
This list of Air France destinations includes the city, country, and the airport's name, with the airline's hubs marked. The list marks whether the services are seasonal, and adds dates for new future entries. This list includes Air France Cargo services and those destinations served for Air France by its subsidiaries and franchisees Air Corsica, Air France Hop, Airlinair, Chalair and CityJet.

| Country or territory | City | Airport | Notes | Refs |
|---|---|---|---|---|
| Albania | Tirana | Tirana International Airport Nënë Tereza | Seasonal | |
| Algeria | Algiers | Houari Boumediene Airport | Passenger | |
| Algeria | Oran | Ahmed Ben Bella Airport | Passenger | |
| Angola | Luanda | Dr. António Agostinho Neto International Airport | Passenger | |
| Angola | Luanda | Quatro de Fevereiro Airport | Airport closed | |
| Armenia | Yerevan | Zvartnots International Airport | Passenger | |
| Argentina | Buenos Aires | Ministro Pistarini International Airport | Passenger | |
| Australia | Brisbane | Brisbane Airport | Terminated | |
| Australia | Darwin | Darwin Airport | Terminated | |
| Australia | Sydney | Sydney Airport | Terminated | |
| Austria | Graz | Graz Airport | Terminated | |
| Austria | Innsbruck | Innsbruck Airport | Seasonal | |
| Austria | Linz | Linz Airport | Terminated | |
| Austria | Salzburg | Salzburg Airport | Seasonal | |
| Austria | Vienna | Vienna International Airport | Passenger | |
| Bahrain | Manama | Bahrain International Airport | Terminated | |
| Belgium | Antwerp | Antwerp International Airport | Terminated | |
| Belgium | Brussels | Brussels Airport | Terminated | |
| Benin | Cotonou | Cadjehoun Airport | Passenger | |
| Botswana | Gaborone | Sir Seretse Khama International Airport | Terminated | |
| Brazil | Belém | Belém/Val-de-Cans International Airport | Seasonal | |
| Brazil | Brasília | Brasília International Airport | Terminated | |
| Brazil | Campinas | Viracopos International Airport | Terminated | |
| Brazil | Fortaleza | Pinto Martins – Fortaleza International Airport | Passenger | |
| Brazil | Manaus | Eduardo Gomes International Airport | Terminated | |
| Brazil | Recife | Recife/Guararapes–Gilberto Freyre International Airport | Terminated | |
| Brazil | Rio de Janeiro | Rio de Janeiro/Galeão International Airport | Passenger | |
| Brazil | Salvador | Salvador Bahia Airport | Passenger | |
| Brazil | São Paulo | São Paulo/Guarulhos International Airport | Passenger | |
| Bulgaria | Sofia | Vasil Levski Sofia Airport | Seasonal | |
| Burkina Faso | Ouagadougou | Ouagadougou Airport | Passenger | |
| Burundi | Bujumbura | Bujumbura International Airport | Terminated | |
| Cambodia | Phnom Penh | Phnom Penh International Airport | Terminated | |
| Cameroon | Douala | Douala International Airport | Passenger | |
| Cameroon | Yaoundé | Yaoundé Nsimalen International Airport | Passenger | |
| Canada | Gander | Gander International Airport | Terminated | |
| Canada | Montréal | Montréal–Trudeau International Airport | Passenger | |
| Canada | Ottawa | Ottawa Macdonald–Cartier International Airport | Passenger | |
| Canada | Quebec City | Québec City Jean Lesage International Airport | Seasonal | |
| Canada | Toronto | Toronto Pearson International Airport | Passenger | |
| Canada | Vancouver | Vancouver International Airport | Passenger | |
| Central African Republic | Bangui | Bangui M'Poko International Airport | Terminated | |
| Chad | N'Djamena | N'Djamena International Airport | Passenger | |
| Chile | Santiago | Arturo Merino Benítez International Airport | Passenger | |
| China | Beijing | Beijing Capital International Airport | Passenger | |
| China | Guangzhou | Guangzhou Baiyun International Airport | Terminated | |
| China | Shanghai | Shanghai Pudong International Airport | Passenger | |
| China | Tianjin | Tianjin Binhai International Airport | Terminated | |
| China | Wuhan | Wuhan Tianhe International Airport | Terminated | |
| Colombia | Bogotá | El Dorado International Airport | Passenger | |
| Comoros | Moroni | Prince Said Ibrahim International Airport | Terminated | |
| Costa Rica | San José | Juan Santamaría International Airport | Passenger | |
| Croatia | Dubrovnik | Dubrovnik Airport | Seasonal | |
| Croatia | Split | Split Airport | Seasonal | |
| Croatia | Zagreb | Zagreb Airport | Passenger | |
| Cuba | Havana | José Martí International Airport | Suspended | |
| Czech Republic | Prague | Václav Havel Airport Prague | Passenger | |
| Democratic Republic of Congo | Kinshasa | N'djili Airport | Passenger | |
| Denmark | Billund | Billund Airport | Passenger | |
| Denmark | Copenhagen | Copenhagen Airport | Passenger | |
| Djibouti | Djibouti City | Djibouti–Ambouli International Airport | Passenger | |
| Dominican Republic | Punta Cana | Punta Cana International Airport | Seasonal | |
| Dominican Republic | Santo Domingo | Las Américas International Airport | Seasonal | |
| Ecuador | Quito | Mariscal Sucre International Airport | Terminated | |
| Egypt | Cairo | Cairo International Airport | Passenger + cargo | |
| Equatorial Guinea | Bata | Bata Airport | Passenger + cargo | |
| Equatorial Guinea | Malabo | Malabo International Airport | Passenger | |
| Finland | Helsinki | Helsinki Airport | Passenger | |
| Finland | Kittilä | Kittilä Airport | Seasonal | |
| Finland | Rovaniemi | Rovaniemi Airport | Seasonal | |
| France | Agen | Agen La Garenne Airport | Terminated | |
| France | Ajaccio | Ajaccio Napoleon Bonaparte Airport | Passenger | |
| France | Annecy | Annecy – Haute-Savoie – Mont Blanc Airport | Terminated | |
| France | Aurillac | Aurillac – Tronquières Airport | Terminated | |
| France | Bastia | Bastia – Poretta Airport | Passenger | |
| France | Biarritz | Biarritz Pays Basque Airport | Passenger | |
| France | Bordeaux | Bordeaux–Mérignac Airport | Passenger | |
| France | Brest | Brest Bretagne Airport | Passenger | |
| France | Brive | Brive–Souillac Airport | Passenger | |
| France | Caen | Caen – Carpiquet Airport | Passenger | |
| France | Calvi | Calvi – Sainte-Catherine Airport | Passenger | |
| France | Castres | Castres–Mazamet Airport | Terminated | |
| France | Clermont-Ferrand | Clermont-Ferrand Auvergne Airport | Passenger | |
| France | Deauville | Deauville – Normandie Airport | Terminated | |
| France | Figari | Figari Sud-Corse Airport | Passenger | |
| France | Lannion | Lannion – Côte de Granit Airport | Terminated | |
| France | La Rochelle | La Rochelle – Île de Ré Airport | Passenger | |
| France | Lille | Lille Airport | Passenger | |
| France | Limoges | Limoges – Bellegarde Airport | Terminated | |
| France | Lorient | Lorient South Brittany Airport | Terminated | |
| France | Lourdes | Tarbes–Lourdes–Pyrénées Airport | Terminated | |
| France | Lyon | Lyon–Saint-Exupéry Airport | Secondary hub | |
| France | Marseille | Marseille Provence Airport | Secondary hub | |
| France | Metz/Nancy | Metz–Nancy–Lorraine Airport | Terminated | |
| France | Montpellier | Montpellier–Méditerranée Airport | Passenger | |
| France | Nantes | Nantes Atlantique Airport | Focus city | |
| France | Nice | Nice Côte d'Azur Airport | Secondary hub | |
| France | Paris | Charles de Gaulle Airport | Hub | |
| France | Paris | Orly Airport | Hub | |
| France | Pau | Pau Pyrénées Airport | Passenger | |
| France | Perpignan | Perpignan–Rivesaltes Airport | Passenger | |
| France | Quimper | Quimper–Cornouaille Airport | Terminated | |
| France | Rennes | Rennes–Saint-Jacques Airport | Passenger | |
| France | Rodez | Rodez–Aveyron Airport | Terminated | |
| France | Rouen | Rouen Airport | Terminated | |
| France | Strasbourg | Strasbourg Airport | Passenger | |
| France | Toulon | Toulon–Hyères Airport | Passenger | |
| France | Toulouse | Toulouse–Blagnac Airport | Secondary hub | |
| French Guiana | Cayenne | Cayenne – Félix Eboué Airport | Passenger | |
| French Polynesia | Papeete | Faa'a International Airport | Passenger | |
| Gabon | Libreville | Libreville International Airport | Suspended | |
| Gambia | Banjul | Banjul International Airport | Passenger | |
| Georgia | Tbilisi | Tbilisi International Airport | Passenger | |
| Germany | Berlin | Berlin Brandenburg Airport | Passenger | |
| Germany | Berlin | Berlin Tegel Airport | Airport closed | |
| Germany | Bremen | Bremen Airport | Passenger | |
| Germany | Dresden | Dresden Airport | Terminated | |
| Germany | Düsseldorf | Düsseldorf Airport | Passenger | |
| Germany | Frankfurt | Frankfurt Airport | Passenger | |
| Germany | Hamburg | Hamburg Airport | Passenger | |
| Germany | Hanover | Hannover Airport | Passenger | |
| Germany | Leipzig | Leipzig/Halle Airport | Terminated | |
| Germany | Munich | Munich Airport | Passenger | |
| Germany | Nuremberg | Nuremberg Airport | Passenger | |
| Germany | Stuttgart | Stuttgart Airport | Passenger | |
| Ghana | Accra | Accra International Airport | Terminated | |
| Greece | Athens | Athens International Airport | Passenger | |
| Greece | Corfu | Corfu International Airport | Seasonal | |
| Greece | Heraklion | Heraklion International Airport | Seasonal | |
| Greece | Kalamata | Kalamata International Airport | Seasonal | |
| Greece | Mykonos | Mykonos Airport | Seasonal | |
| Greece | Rhodes | Rhodes International Airport | Seasonal | |
| Greece | Santorini | Santorini (Thira) International Airport | Seasonal | |
| Greece | Thessaloniki | Thessaloniki Airport | Seasonal | |
| Greece | Zakynthos | Zakynthos International Airport | Seasonal | |
| Guadeloupe | Pointe-à-Pitre | Pointe-à-Pitre International Airport | Passenger | |
| Guernsey | Guernsey | Guernsey Airport | Terminated | |
| Guinea | Conakry | Conakry International Airport | Passenger | |
| Haiti | Port-au-Prince | Toussaint Louverture International Airport | Passenger | |
| Hong Kong | Chek Lap Kok | Hong Kong International Airport | Passenger | |
| Hungary | Budapest | Budapest Ferenc Liszt International Airport | Passenger | |
| India | Bengaluru | Kempegowda International Airport | Passenger | |
| India | Chennai | Chennai International Airport | Terminated | |
| India | Delhi | Indira Gandhi International Airport | Passenger | |
| India | Kolkata | Netaji Subhash Chandra Bose International Airport | Terminated | |
| India | Mumbai | Chhatrapati Shivaji Maharaj International Airport | Passenger + cargo | |
| Indonesia | Denpasar | Ngurah Rai International Airport | Terminated | |
| Indonesia | Jakarta | Soekarno–Hatta International Airport | Terminated | |
| Iraq | Baghdad | Baghdad International Airport | Terminated | |
| Iran | Tehran | Tehran Imam Khomeini International Airport | Terminated | |
| Ireland | Cork | Cork Airport | Seasonal | |
| Ireland | Dublin | Dublin Airport | Passenger + cargo | |
| Ireland | Shannon | Shannon Airport | Terminated | |
| Israel | Tel Aviv | Ben Gurion Airport | Passenger | |
| Italy | Bari | Bari Karol Wojtyła Airport | Passenger | |
| Italy | Bologna | Bologna Guglielmo Marconi Airport | Passenger | |
| Italy | Cagliari | Cagliari Elmas Airport | Seasonal | |
| Italy | Catania | Catania–Fontanarossa Airport | Passenger | |
| Italy | Florence | Florence Airport | Passenger | |
| Italy | Genoa | Genoa Cristoforo Colombo Airport | Seasonal | |
| Italy | Milan | Linate Airport | Passenger | |
| Italy | Milan | Milan Malpensa Airport | Passenger | |
| Italy | Naples | Naples International Airport | Passenger | |
| Italy | Palermo | Falcone Borsellino Airport | Seasonal | |
| Italy | Olbia | Olbia Costa Smeralda Airport | Seasonal | |
| Italy | Pisa | Pisa International Airport | Seasonal | |
| Italy | Rome | Leonardo da Vinci–Fiumicino Airport | Passenger | |
| Italy | Turin | Turin Airport | Passenger | |
| Italy | Venice | Venice Marco Polo Airport | Passenger | |
| Italy | Verona | Verona Villafranca Airport | Seasonal | |
| Ivory Coast (Côte d'Ivoire) | Abidjan | Félix-Houphouët-Boigny International Airport | Passenger | |
| Japan | Nagoya | Nagoya Komaki Airport | Terminated | |
| Japan | Osaka | Kansai International Airport | Passenger | |
| Japan | Tokyo | Haneda Airport | Passenger | |
| Japan | Tokyo | Narita International Airport | Cargo | |
| Jersey | Jersey | Jersey Airport | Terminated | |
| Jordan | Amman | Queen Alia International Airport | Terminated | |
| Kenya | Nairobi | Jomo Kenyatta International Airport | Passenger | |
| Kuwait | Kuwait City | Kuwait International Airport | Terminated | |
| Laos | Vientiane | Wattay International Airport | Terminated | |
| Lebanon | Beirut | Beirut–Rafic Hariri International Airport | Passenger | |
| Liberia | Monrovia | Roberts International Airport | Passenger | |
| Libya | Tripoli | Tripoli International Airport | Terminated | |
| Libya | Benghazi | Benina International Airport | Terminated | |
| Madagascar | Antananarivo | Ivato International Airport | Passenger | |
| Madagascar | Majunga | Amborovy Airport | Terminated | |
| Malawi | Lilongwe | Lilongwe International Airport | Terminated | |
| Malaysia | Kuala Lumpur | Kuala Lumpur International Airport | Terminated | |
| Maldives | Malé | Velana International Airport | Seasonal | |
| Mali | Bamako | Modibo Keita International Airport | Passenger | |
| Malta | Malta | Malta International Airport | Seasonal | |
| Martinique | Fort-de-France | Martinique Aimé Césaire International Airport | Passenger | |
| Mauritania | Nouakchott | Nouakchott–Oumtounsy International Airport | Passenger | |
| Mauritius | Port Louis | Sir Seewoosagur Ramgoolam International Airport | Passenger | |
| Mayotte | Dzaoudzi | Dzaoudzi Pamandzi International Airport | Terminated | |
| Mexico | Acapulco | Acapulco International Airport | Terminated | |
| Mexico | Cancún | Cancún International Airport | Passenger | |
| Mexico | Guadalajara | Guadalajara International Airport | Cargo | |
| Mexico | Mexico City | Mexico City International Airport | Passenger + cargo | |
| Mexico | Puerto Vallarta | Licenciado Gustavo Díaz Ordaz International Airport | Terminated | |
| Morocco | Agadir | Agadir–Al Massira Airport | Seasonal | |
| Morocco | Casablanca | Mohammed V International Airport | Passenger + cargo | |
| Morocco | Fez | Saïss Airport | Terminated | |
| Morocco | Marrakesh | Marrakesh Menara Airport | Passenger | |
| Morocco | Ouarzazate | Ouarzazate Airport | Terminated | |
| Morocco | Oujda | Angads Airport | Terminated | |
| Morocco | Rabat | Rabat–Salé Airport | Passenger | |
| Morocco | Tangier | Tangier Ibn Battouta Airport | Passenger | |
| Mozambique | Maputo | Maputo International Airport | Passenger | |
| Myanmar | Yangon | Yangon International Airport | Terminated | |
| Namibia | Windhoek | Hosea Kutako International Airport | Terminated | |
| Netherlands | Amsterdam | Amsterdam Airport Schiphol | Passenger | |
| Netherlands | Rotterdam | Rotterdam The Hague Airport | Terminated | |
| New Caledonia | Noumea | La Tontouta International Airport | Terminated | |
| New Zealand | Auckland | Auckland Airport | Terminated | |
| Niger | Niamey | Diori Hamani International Airport | Passenger | |
| Nigeria | Abuja | Nnamdi Azikiwe International Airport | Passenger | |
| Nigeria | Lagos | Murtala Muhammed International Airport | Passenger | |
| Nigeria | Port Harcourt | Port Harcourt International Airport | Passenger + cargo | |
| Norway | Bergen | Bergen Airport, Flesland | Seasonal | |
| Norway | Harstad/Narvik | Harstad/Narvik Airport, Evenes | Terminated | |
| Norway | Oslo | Oslo Airport, Gardermoen | Passenger | |
| Norway | Stavanger | Stavanger Airport | Terminated | |
| Norway | Tromsø | Tromsø Airport | Seasonal | |
| Oman | Muscat | Muscat International Airport | Seasonal | |
| Pakistan | Karachi | Jinnah International Airport | Terminated | |
| Panama | Panama City | Tocumen International Airport | Passenger | |
| Peru | Lima | Jorge Chávez International Airport | Passenger | |
| Philippines | Manila | Ninoy Aquino International Airport | Seasonal | |
| Poland | Kraków | Kraków John Paul II International Airport | Seasonal | |
| Poland | Warsaw | Warsaw Chopin Airport | Passenger | |
| Poland | Wrocław | Wrocław Airport | Seasonal | |
| Portugal | Faro | Faro Airport | Passenger | |
| Portugal | Lisbon | Lisbon Airport | Passenger | |
| Portugal | Porto | Porto Airport | Passenger | |
| Puerto Rico | San Juan | Luis Muñoz Marín International Airport | Terminated | |
| Qatar | Doha | Hamad International Airport | Passenger | |
| Republic of Congo | Brazzaville | Maya-Maya Airport | Passenger + cargo | |
| Republic of Congo | Pointe-Noire | Pointe Noire Airport | Passenger + cargo | |
| Réunion | Saint-Denis | Roland Garros Airport | Passenger + cargo | |
| Romania | Bucharest | Henri Coandă International Airport | Passenger | |
| Russia | Moscow | Sheremetyevo International Airport | Terminated | |
| Russia | Saint Petersburg | Pulkovo Airport | Terminated | |
| Rwanda | Kigali | Kigali International Airport | Terminated | |
| Saint Lucia | Castries | George F. L. Charles Airport | Terminated | |
| Saudi Arabia | Dammam | King Fahd International Airport | Cargo | |
| Saudi Arabia | Dhahran | Dhahran International Airport | Airport closed | |
| Saudi Arabia | Jeddah | King Abdulaziz International Airport | Terminated | |
| Saudi Arabia | Riyadh | King Khalid International Airport | Passenger | |
| Senegal | Dakar | Blaise Diagne International Airport | Passenger | |
| Senegal | Dakar | Léopold Sédar Senghor International Airport | Cargo | |
| Serbia | Belgrade | Belgrade Nikola Tesla Airport | Seasonal | |
| Seychelles | Mahe | Seychelles International Airport | Seasonal | |
| Sierra Leone | Freetown | Lungi International Airport | Passenger | |
| Singapore | Singapore | Changi Airport | Passenger | |
| Sint Maarten | Philipsburg | Princess Juliana International Airport | Passenger | |
| Slovenia | Ljubljana | Ljubljana Jože Pučnik Airport | Passenger | |
| South Africa | Cape Town | Cape Town International Airport | Passenger | |
| South Africa | Johannesburg | O. R. Tambo International Airport | Passenger | |
| South Korea | Seoul | Incheon International Airport | Passenger + cargo | |
| Spain | Alicante | Alicante–Elche Miguel Hernández Airport | Terminated | |
| Spain | Barcelona | Josep Tarradellas Barcelona–El Prat Airport | Passenger | |
| Spain | Bilbao | Bilbao Airport | Passenger | |
| Spain | Ibiza | Ibiza Airport | Passenger | |
| Spain | Las Palmas | Gran Canaria Airport | Seasonal | |
| Spain | Madrid | Madrid–Barajas Airport | Passenger | |
| Spain | Málaga | Málaga Airport | Passenger | |
| Spain | Oviedo | Asturias Airport | Terminated | |
| Spain | Palma de Mallorca | Palma de Mallorca Airport | Seasonal | |
| Spain | Santa Cruz de Tenerife | Tenerife South Airport | Passenger | |
| Spain | Seville | Seville Airport | Seasonal | |
| Spain | Valencia | Valencia Airport | Seasonal | |
| Spain | Vigo | Vigo-Peinador Airport | Terminated | |
| Spain | Zaragoza | Zaragoza Airport | Cargo | |
| Sri Lanka | Colombo | Bandaranaike International Airport | Seasonal | |
| Sudan | Khartoum | Khartoum International Airport | Terminated | |
| Sweden | Gothenburg | Göteborg Landvetter Airport | Passenger | |
| Sweden | Kiruna | Kiruna Airport | Seasonal | |
| Sweden | Stockholm | Stockholm Arlanda Airport | Passenger | |
| Switzerland | Geneva | Geneva Airport | Passenger | |
| Switzerland | Zürich | Zurich Airport | Passenger | |
| Switzerland; France; Germany | Basel; Mulhouse; Freiburg | EuroAirport Basel Mulhouse Freiburg | Passenger | |
| Syria | Damascus | Damascus International Airport | Terminated | |
| Taiwan | Taipei | Taoyuan International Airport | Terminated | |
| Tanzania | Arusha | Kilimanjaro International Airport | Seasonal | |
| Tanzania | Dar Es Salaam | Julius Nyerere International Airport | Seasonal | |
| Tanzania | Zanzibar | Abeid Amani Karume International Airport | Passenger | |
| Thailand | Bangkok | Don Mueang International Airport | Terminated | |
| Thailand | Bangkok | Suvarnabhumi Airport | Passenger | |
| Thailand | Phuket | Phuket International Airport | Passenger | |
| Togo | Lomé | Lomé–Tokoin International Airport | Passenger | |
| Tunisia | Djerba | Djerba–Zarzis International Airport | Seasonal | |
| Tunisia | Monastir | Monastir Habib Bourguiba International Airport | Seasonal | |
| Tunisia | Sfax | Sfax–Thyna International Airport | Terminated | |
| Tunisia | Tunis | Tunis–Carthage International Airport | Passenger | |
| Turkey | Istanbul | Atatürk Airport | Airport closed | |
| Turkey | Istanbul | Istanbul Airport | Passenger | |
| Ukraine | Kyiv | Boryspil International Airport | Suspended | |
| United Arab Emirates | Abu Dhabi | Zayed International Airport | Terminated | |
| United Arab Emirates | Dubai | Dubai International Airport | Passenger + cargo | |
| United Kingdom | Aberdeen | Aberdeen Airport | Terminated | |
| United Kingdom | Birmingham | Birmingham Airport | Passenger | |
| United Kingdom | Bristol | Bristol Airport | Terminated | |
| United Kingdom | Edinburgh | Edinburgh Airport | Passenger | |
| United Kingdom | Glasgow | Glasgow Airport | Terminated | |
| United Kingdom | Glasgow | Glasgow Prestwick Airport | Cargo | |
| United Kingdom | London | London Gatwick Airport | Passenger | |
| United Kingdom | London | London City Airport | Terminated | |
| United Kingdom | London | Heathrow Airport | Passenger | |
| United Kingdom | London | Luton Airport | Terminated | |
| United Kingdom | Manchester | Manchester Airport | Passenger | |
| United Kingdom | Newcastle upon Tyne | Newcastle Airport | Passenger | |
| United Kingdom | Southampton | Southampton Airport | Terminated | |
| United States | Anchorage | Ted Stevens Anchorage International Airport | Terminated | |
| United States | Atlanta | Hartsfield–Jackson Atlanta International Airport | Passenger | |
| United States | Boston | Logan International Airport | Passenger + cargo | |
| United States | Chicago | O'Hare International Airport | Passenger + cargo | |
| United States | Cincinnati | Cincinnati/Northern Kentucky International Airport | Terminated | |
| United States | Dallas/Fort Worth | Dallas Fort Worth International Airport | Passenger | |
| United States | Denver | Denver International Airport | Seasonal | |
| United States | Detroit | Detroit Metropolitan Airport | Passenger | |
| United States | Houston | George Bush Intercontinental Airport | Passenger + cargo | |
| United States | Las Vegas | Harry Reid International Airport | Passenger | |
| United States | Los Angeles | Los Angeles International Airport | Passenger | |
| United States | Miami | Miami International Airport | Passenger | |
| United States | Minneapolis | Minneapolis–Saint Paul International Airport | Passenger | |
| United States | New York City | John F. Kennedy International Airport | Passenger + cargo | |
| United States | Newark | Newark Liberty International Airport | Passenger | |
| United States | Orlando | Orlando International Airport | Passenger | |
| United States | Phoenix | Phoenix Sky Harbor International Airport | Passenger | |
| United States | Philadelphia | Philadelphia International Airport | Terminated | |
| United States | Raleigh/Durham | Raleigh–Durham International Airport | Passenger | |
| United States | San Francisco | San Francisco International Airport | Passenger | |
| United States | Seattle | Seattle–Tacoma International Airport | Passenger | |
| United States | Washington, D.C. | Washington Dulles International Airport | Passenger | |
| Uruguay | Montevideo | Carrasco International Airport | Terminated | |
| Venezuela | Caracas | Simón Bolívar International Airport | Terminated | |
| Vietnam | Hanoi | Noi Bai International Airport | Cargo | |
| Vietnam | Ho Chi Minh City | Tan Son Nhat International Airport | Passenger | |
| Yemen | Aden | Aden International Airport | Terminated | |
| Yemen | Sanaa | Sanaa International Airport | Terminated | |
| Zimbabwe | Harare | Robert Gabriel Mugabe International Airport | Terminated | |

== See also ==
- Air France–KLM
- List of KLM destinations
- List of Scandinavian Airlines destinations
- List of Transavia France destinations
- List of Transavia destinations
