= List of Scandinavian Airlines destinations =

Destinations served by Scandinavian Airlines

This is a list of destinations operated to by Scandinavian Airlines (SAS) as of June 2025. The list includes destinations served by airlines with which SAS has or previously had a wet lease agreement, such as CityJet, Cimber Sterling, PrivatAir, Scandinavian Airlines Ireland, or Widerøe. It includes the destination's country (or applicable territory), city, airport name, and airline's notable status marked where applicable - such as seasonality, as a hub, as a future destination (with an accompanying launch date), or as a terminated destination.

countries served by SAS as of June 2025

== List ==
Country/Territory	City	Airport	Notes	Refs
Albania	Tirana	Tirana International Airport Nënë Tereza	Seasonal	
Argentina	Buenos Aires	Ministro Pistarini International Airport	Terminated	
Austria	Innsbruck	Innsbruck Airport	Seasonal	
Austria	Salzburg	Salzburg Airport	Seasonal	
Austria	Vienna	Vienna International Airport		
Belarus	Minsk	Minsk National Airport	Terminated	
Belgium	Brussels	Brussels Airport		
Bosnia and Herzegovina	Sarajevo	Sarajevo International Airport	Seasonal	
Brazil	Campinas	Viracopos–Campinas International Airport	Terminated	
Brazil	Natal	Greater Natal International Airport	Terminated	
Brazil	Rio de Janeiro	Rio de Janeiro/Galeão International Airport	Terminated	
Brazil	São Paulo	São Paulo/Guarulhos International Airport	Terminated	
Bulgaria	Varna	Varna Airport		
Canada	Montreal	Montréal–Trudeau International Airport	Terminated	
Canada	Toronto	Toronto Pearson International Airport		
Chile	Santiago	Arturo Merino Benítez International Airport	Terminated	
China	Beijing	Beijing Capital International Airport	Terminated	
China	Shanghai	Shanghai Pudong International Airport	Terminated	
Croatia	Dubrovnik	Dubrovnik Airport	Seasonal	
Croatia	Pula	Pula Airport	Seasonal	
Croatia	Split	Split Airport	Seasonal	
Croatia	Zadar	Zadar Airport	Terminated	
Cyprus	Larnaca	Larnaca International Airport	Seasonal	
Czech Republic	Prague	Václav Havel Airport Prague		
Denmark	Aalborg	Aalborg Airport		
Denmark	Aarhus	Aarhus Airport		
Denmark	Billund	Billund Airport		
Denmark	Bornholm	Bornholm Airport	Seasonal	
Denmark	Copenhagen	Copenhagen Airport	Hub	
Egypt	Cairo	Cairo International Airport	Terminated	
Estonia	Tallinn	Tallinn Airport		
Faroe Islands	Sørvágur	Vágar Airport		
Finland	Helsinki	Helsinki Airport		
Finland	Kittilä	Kittilä Airport	Seasonal	
Finland	Oulu	Oulu Airport	Terminated	
Finland	Rovaniemi	Rovaniemi Airport	Seasonal	
Finland	Tampere	Tampere–Pirkkala Airport	Terminated	
Finland	Turku	Turku Airport		
Finland	Vaasa	Vaasa Airport	Seasonal	
France	Biarritz	Biarritz Pays Basque Airport	Seasonal	
France	Bordeaux	Bordeaux–Mérignac Airport		
France	Lyon	Lyon–Saint-Exupéry Airport	Seasonal	
France	Marseille	Marseille Provence Airport	Seasonal	
France	Montpellier	Montpellier–Méditerranée Airport		
France	Nice	Nice Côte d'Azur Airport		
France	Paris	Charles de Gaulle Airport		
Germany	Berlin	Berlin Brandenburg Airport		
Germany	Berlin	Berlin Tegel Airport	Airport closed	
Germany	Bremen	Bremen Airport	Terminated	
Germany	Düsseldorf	Düsseldorf Airport		
Germany	Frankfurt	Frankfurt Airport		
Germany	Hamburg	Hamburg Airport		
Germany	Hanover	Hannover Airport		
Germany	Munich	Munich Airport		
Germany	Nuremberg	Nuremberg Airport	Terminated	
Germany	Stuttgart	Stuttgart Airport		
Greece	Athens	Athens International Airport		
Greece	Chania	Chania International Airport	Seasonal	
Greece	Corfu	Corfu International Airport	Seasonal	
Greece	Heraklion	Heraklion International Airport	Seasonal	
Greece	Kalamata	Kalamata International Airport	Seasonal	
Greece	Karpathos	Karpathos Island National Airport	Seasonal	
Greece	Rhodes	Rhodes International Airport	Seasonal	
Greece	Santorini	Santorini (Thira) International Airport	Seasonal	
Greece	Thessaloniki	Thessaloniki International Airport	Seasonal	
Greece	Zakynthos	Zakynthos International Airport	Seasonal	
Greenland	Kangerlussuaq	Kangerlussuaq Airport	Terminated	
Greenland	Nuuk	Nuuk Airport	Seasonal	
Hong Kong	Hong Kong	Hong Kong International Airport	Terminated	
Hong Kong	Hong Kong	Kai Tak Airport	Airport closed	
Hungary	Budapest	Budapest Ferenc Liszt International Airport	Seasonal	
Iceland	Reykjavík	Keflavík International Airport		
India	Delhi	Indira Gandhi International Airport	Terminated	
India	Kolkata	Netaji Subhas Chandra Bose International Airport	Terminated	
India	Mumbai	Chhatrapati Shivaji Maharaj International Airport		
Iran	Tehran	Mehrabad International Airport	Terminated	
Iraq	Baghdad	Baghdad International Airport	Terminated	
Iraq	Basra	Basra International Airport	Terminated	
Ireland	Dublin	Dublin Airport		
Ireland	Shannon	Shannon Airport	Terminated	
Israel	Eilat	Ovda Airport	Airport closed	
Israel	Tel Aviv	Ben Gurion Airport	Resumes 26 October 2026	
Italy	Bari	Bari Karol Wojtyła Airport	Seasonal	
Italy	Bologna	Bologna Guglielmo Marconi Airport		
Italy	Cagliari	Cagliari Elmas Airport		
Italy	Catania	Catania–Fontanarossa Airport	Seasonal	
Italy	Florence	Florence Airport	Seasonal	
Italy	Genoa	Genoa Cristoforo Colombo Airport	Seasonal	
Italy	Milan	Milan Linate Airport		
Italy	Milan	Milan Malpensa Airport		
Italy	Naples	Naples International Airport		
Italy	Olbia	Olbia Costa Smeralda Airport	Seasonal	
Italy	Palermo	Falcone Borsellino Airport	Seasonal	
Italy	Pisa	Pisa International Airport	Seasonal	
Italy	Rome	Leonardo da Vinci–Fiumicino Airport		
Italy	Turin	Turin Airport	Terminated	
Italy	Venice	Venice Marco Polo Airport		
Japan	Nagoya	Chubu Centrair International Airport	Terminated	
Japan	Osaka	Kansai International Airport	Terminated	
Japan	Tokyo	Haneda Airport		
Japan	Tokyo	Narita International Airport	Terminated	
Jersey	St Brelade	Jersey Airport	Terminated	
Jordan	Amman	Queen Alia International Airport	Terminated	
Kenya	Nairobi	Jomo Kenyatta International Airport	Terminated	
Kosovo	Pristina	Pristina International Airport	Seasonal	
Kuwait	Kuwait City	Kuwait International Airport	Terminated	
Latvia	Riga	Riga International Airport		
Lebanon	Beirut	Beirut–Rafic Hariri International Airport	Seasonal	
Lithuania	Palanga	Palanga International Airport		
Lithuania	Vilnius	Vilnius Čiurlionis International Airport		
Luxembourg	Luxembourg	Luxembourg Airport		
Malta	Luqa	Malta International Airport	Seasonal	
Montenegro	Tivat	Tivat Airport	Seasonal	
Morocco	Agadir	Agadir–Al Massira Airport		
Morocco	Marrakesh	Marrakesh Menara Airport	Seasonal	
Netherlands	Amsterdam	Amsterdam Airport Schiphol		
Norway	Ålesund	Ålesund Airport, Vigra		
Norway	Alta	Alta Airport		
Norway	Bardufoss	Bardufoss Airport	Seasonal	
Norway	Bergen	Bergen Airport, Flesland	Hub	
Norway	Bodø	Bodø Airport		
Norway	Harstad/Narvik	Harstad/Narvik Airport, Evenes		
Norway	Haugesund	Haugesund Airport		
Norway	Kirkenes	Kirkenes Airport		
Norway	Kristiansand	Kristiansand Airport		
Norway	Kristiansund	Kristiansund Airport, Kvernberget		
Norway	Lakselv	Lakselv Airport		
Norway	Longyearbyen	Svalbard Airport		
Norway	Molde	Molde Airport	Terminated	
Norway	Oslo	Oslo Airport, Gardermoen	Hub	
Norway	Oslo	Moss Airport, Rygge	Terminated	
Norway	Sandefjord	Sandefjord Airport, Torp		
Norway	Stavanger	Stavanger Airport	Hub	
Norway	Tromsø	Tromsø Airport		
Norway	Trondheim	Trondheim Airport	Hub	
Pakistan	Karachi	Jinnah International Airport	Terminated	
Philippines	Manila	Ninoy Aquino International Airport	Terminated	
Poland	Gdańsk	Gdańsk Lech Wałęsa Airport		
Poland	Katowice	Katowice Airport	Terminated	
Poland	Kraków	Kraków John Paul II International Airport		
Poland	Łódź	Łódź Władysław Reymont Airport	Terminated	
Poland	Poznań	Poznań–Ławica Airport		
Poland	Szczecin	Solidarity Szczecin–Goleniów Airport	Terminated	
Poland	Warsaw	Warsaw Chopin Airport		
Poland	Wrocław	Wrocław Airport		
Portugal	Faro	Faro Airport		
Portugal	Funchal	Madeira Airport	Seasonal	
Portugal	Lisbon	Lisbon Airport		
Portugal	Porto	Porto Airport		
Romania	Bucharest	Henri Coandă International Airport	Seasonal	
Russia	Kaliningrad	Khrabrovo Airport	Terminated	
Russia	Moscow	Sheremetyevo International Airport	Terminated	
Russia	Saint Petersburg	Pulkovo Airport	Terminated	
Saudi Arabia	Jeddah	King Abdulaziz International Airport	Terminated	
Senegal	Dakar	Léopold Sédar Senghor International Airport	Terminated	
Singapore	Singapore	Changi Airport	Terminated	
South Africa	Johannesburg	O. R. Tambo International Airport	Terminated	
South Korea	Seoul	Incheon International Airport		
Spain	Alicante	Alicante–Elche Miguel Hernández Airport		
Spain	Barcelona	Josep Tarradellas Barcelona–El Prat Airport		
Spain	Bilbao	Bilbao Airport	Seasonal	
Spain	Puerto del Rosario	Fuerteventura Airport		
Spain	Ibiza	Ibiza Airport	Seasonal	
Spain	Las Palmas	Gran Canaria Airport		
Spain	Madrid	Adolfo Suárez Madrid–Barajas Airport		
Spain	Málaga	Málaga Airport		
Spain	Palma de Mallorca	Palma de Mallorca Airport		
Spain	Seville	Seville Airport		
Spain	Tenerife	Tenerife South Airport		
Spain	Valencia	Valencia Airport	Seasonal	
Sri Lanka	Colombo	Bandaranaike International Airport	Terminated	
Sweden	Ängelholm	Ängelholm–Helsingborg Airport		
Sweden	Gothenburg	Göteborg Landvetter Airport	Hub	
Sweden	Kalmar	Kalmar Airport		
Sweden	Kiruna	Kiruna Airport		
Sweden	Linköping	Linköping/Saab Airport	Terminated	
Sweden	Luleå	Luleå Airport		
Sweden	Malmö	Malmö Airport		
Sweden	Örnsköldsvik	Örnsköldsvik Airport	Terminated	
Sweden	Östersund	Åre Östersund Airport		
Sweden	Ronneby	Ronneby Airport		
Sweden	Sälen	Sälen/Scandinavian Mountains Airport	Seasonal	
Sweden	Skellefteå	Skellefteå Airport		
Sweden	Stockholm	Stockholm Arlanda Airport	Hub	
Sweden	Stockholm	Stockholm Bromma Airport	Terminated	
Sweden	Sundsvall	Sundsvall–Timrå Airport		
Sweden	Umeå	Umeå Airport		
Sweden	Visby	Visby Airport		
Switzerland	Geneva	Geneva Airport		
Switzerland	Zürich	Zürich Airport		
Syria	Damascus	Damascus International Airport	Terminated	
Thailand	Bangkok	Don Mueang International Airport	Terminated	
Thailand	Bangkok	Suvarnabhumi Airport	Seasonal	
Thailand	Krabi	Krabi International Airport	Seasonal; Begins 8 December 2026	
Thailand	Phuket	Phuket International Airport	Seasonal; Begins 9 December 2026	
Turkey	Alanya	Gazipaşa–Alanya Airport	Seasonal	
Turkey	Ankara	Ankara Esenboğa Airport	Terminated	
Turkey	Antalya	Antalya Airport	Seasonal	
Turkey	Dalaman	Dalaman Airport		
Turkey	Istanbul	Istanbul Atatürk Airport	Airport closed	
Turkey	Istanbul	Istanbul Airport		
Ukraine	Kyiv	Boryspil International Airport	Suspended	
United Arab Emirates	Dubai	Al Maktoum International Airport	Seasonal; Begins 25 October 2026	
United Arab Emirates	Dubai	Dubai International Airport	Terminated	
United Kingdom	Aberdeen	Aberdeen Airport		
United Kingdom	Birmingham	Birmingham Airport		
United Kingdom	Bristol	Bristol Airport	Terminated	
United Kingdom	Edinburgh	Edinburgh Airport		
United Kingdom	Humberside	Humberside Airport	Terminated	
United Kingdom	London	City Airport	Terminated	
United Kingdom	London	Gatwick Airport	Terminated	
United Kingdom	London	Heathrow Airport		
United Kingdom	London	Stansted Airport	Terminated	
United Kingdom	Manchester	Manchester Airport		
United Kingdom	Newcastle upon Tyne	Newcastle International Airport	Terminated	
United Kingdom	Newquay	Newquay Airport	Terminated	
United States	Atlanta	Hartsfield–Jackson Atlanta International Airport		
United States	Boston	Logan International Airport		
United States	Chicago	O'Hare International Airport		
United States	Houston	George Bush Intercontinental Airport	Terminated	
United States	Los Angeles	Los Angeles International Airport		
United States	Miami	Miami International Airport	Seasonal	
United States	Newark	Newark Liberty International Airport		
United States	New York City	John F. Kennedy International Airport		
United States	New York City	LaGuardia Airport	Terminated	
United States	San Francisco	San Francisco International Airport		
United States	Seattle	Seattle–Tacoma International Airport		
United States	Washington, D.C.	Washington Dulles International Airport		
Uruguay	Montevideo	Carrasco International Airport	Terminated	

== See also ==
- List of Air France destinations
- List of KLM destinations
