= List of KLM destinations =

This is the list of KLM destinations. KLM Royal Dutch Airlines is the flag carrier of the Netherlands.

== History ==
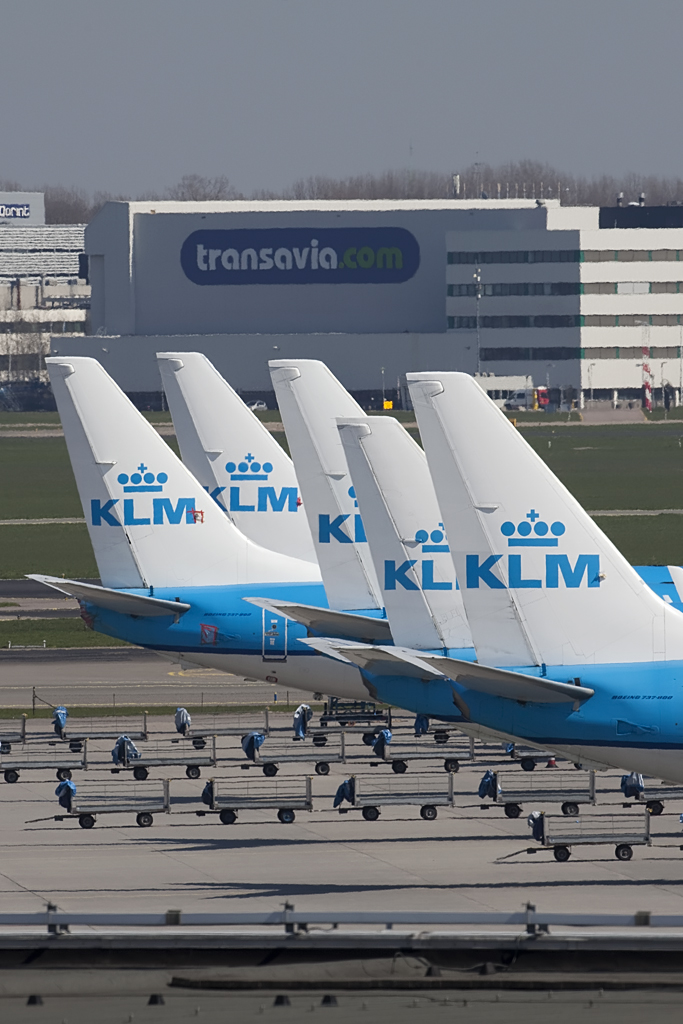
KLM operations at Amsterdam Airport Schiphol

KLM was set up by Albert Plesman on 7 October 1919 and started operations on 19 May 1920. The first route served was Amsterdam to London, flown with DH.9As that carried just two passengers on a charter basis. Two Fokker F.IIs that were delivered in September 1920 were later deployed on this very first route. Intercontinental flights were started with Fokker F.VII equipment in November 1924, serving the Dutch East Indies, although it was not until 1931 that regular services on this line were implemented. It normally took 11 or 12 days to complete the 14,000-kilometre-long (7,600 nmi) flight between Amsterdam and Batavia, calling at Budapest, Athens, Cairo, Baghdad, Bushehr, Jask, Karachi, Jodhpur, Allahabad, Calcutta, Akyab, Rangoon, Bangkok, Medan and Palembang. In 1926, the Rotterdam–Amsterdam–Copenhagen run was extended to Malmö.

Singapore was first served in May 1933, when it was taken over from KNILM and added as an intermediate stop for the Amsterdam–Batavia line. By April 1934, Berlin, Hamburg and Liverpool were already part of the European route network. In May that year, KLM became the first airline that linked Continental Europe with the North of England, when the Amsterdam–Hull route was inaugurated; the Amsterdam–Liverpool service was re-routed via Doncaster in mid-1936. By April 1939, the following twenty-one lines were operative: Amsterdam–Berlin, Amsterdam–Bremen–Hamburg, Amsterdam–Kristiansand–Oslo, Amsterdam–Copenhagen–Malmö, Amsterdam–Copenhagen–Norrköping–Stockholm, Amsterdam–Copenhagen–Stockholm, Amsterdam–Eindhoven, Amsterdam–Groningen–Leeuwarden–Amsterdam, Amsterdam–Leipzig–Budapest–Athens–Alexandria–Lydda–Baghdad–Basra–Jask–Karachi–Jodhpur–Allahabad–Calcutta–Rangoon–Bangkok–Penang–Medan–Singapore–Palembang–Batavia–Bandung that connected with KNILM services, Amsterdam–Manchester–Liverpool, Amsterdam–Twente, Amsterdam–Texel, Amsterdam–London, Amsterdam–Paris, Amsterdam–Rotterdam–Basel–Zürich, Amsterdam–Rotterdam–Cologne, Amsterdam–Rotterdam–Frankfurt–Milan–Rome, Amsterdam–Rotterdam–Haamstede–Vlissingen–Knokke/Zoute, Amsterdam–Rotterdam–London, Amsterdam–Rotterdam–Prague–Vienna–Budapest, and Paris–Copenhagen–Stockholm.

With an intermediate stop at Espinho, the Amsterdam–Lisbon route was opened in April 1940. Initially, these flights carried freight and mail, connected at Lisbon with Pan American Airways Clipper services to New York and had a subsidy from the Dutch Post Office.

== List ==
KLM serves over 170 destinations across the world, as of July 2022 and 161 destinations during the winter 2025/2026 season. Following is a list of destinations the airline and its subsidiaries KLM Cargo and KLM Cityhopper fly to according to their scheduled services.

Country	City/Town	Airport	Notes	Refs
Angola	Luanda	Quatro de Fevereiro Airport	Terminated	
Argentina	Buenos Aires	Ministro Pistarini International Airport		
Aruba	Oranjestad	Queen Beatrix International Airport		
Australia	Melbourne	Melbourne Airport	Terminated	
Australia	Sydney	Sydney Airport	Terminated	
Austria	Graz	Graz Airport	Terminated	
Austria	Innsbruck	Innsbruck Airport	Terminated	
Austria	Salzburg	Salzburg Airport	Terminated	
Austria	Vienna	Vienna International Airport		
Azerbaijan	Baku	Heydar Aliyev International Airport	Terminated	
Bahrain	Manama	Bahrain International Airport	Terminated	
Bangladesh	Dhaka	Shahjalal International Airport	Terminated	
Barbados	Bridgetown	Grantley Adams International Airport	Seasonal	
Belgium	Antwerp	Antwerp International Airport	Terminated	
Belgium	Brussels	Brussels Airport		
Bonaire	Kralendijk	Flamingo International Airport		
Brazil	Fortaleza	Pinto Martins – Fortaleza International Airport	Terminated	
Brazil	Rio de Janeiro	Rio de Janeiro/Galeão International Airport		
Brazil	São Paulo	São Paulo/Guarulhos International Airport		
Cameroon	Douala	Douala International Airport	Terminated	
Canada	Calgary	Calgary International Airport		
Canada	Edmonton	Edmonton International Airport		
Canada	Halifax	Halifax Stanfield International Airport	Terminated	
Canada	Montreal	Montréal–Trudeau International Airport		
Canada	Ottawa	Ottawa Macdonald–Cartier International Airport	Terminated	
Canada	Toronto	Toronto Pearson International Airport		
Canada	Vancouver	Vancouver International Airport		
Chile	Santiago	Arturo Merino Benítez International Airport		
China	Beijing	Beijing Capital International Airport		
China	Chengdu	Chengdu Shuangliu International Airport	Terminated	
China	Hangzhou	Hangzhou Xiaoshan International Airport	Terminated	
China	Shanghai	Shanghai Pudong International Airport		
China	Xiamen	Xiamen Gaoqi International Airport	Terminated	
Colombia	Barranquilla	Soledad Airport	Terminated	
Colombia	Bogotá	El Dorado International Airport		
Colombia	Cali	Alfonso Bonilla Aragón International Airport	Terminated	
Colombia	Cartagena	Rafael Núñez International Airport		
Costa Rica	Liberia	Daniel Oduber Quirós International Airport	Seasonal	
Costa Rica	San José	Juan Santamaría International Airport	Seasonal	
Croatia	Dubrovnik	Dubrovnik Airport	Seasonal	
Croatia	Split	Split Airport	Seasonal	
Croatia	Zagreb	Zagreb Airport		
Cuba	Havana	José Martí International Airport	Terminated	
Curaçao	Willemstad	Hato International Airport		
Cyprus	Larnaca	Larnaca International Airport	Terminated	
Czech Republic	Prague	Václav Havel Airport Prague		
Denmark	Aalborg	Aalborg Airport		
Denmark	Aarhus	Aarhus Airport		
Denmark	Billund	Billund Airport		
Denmark	Copenhagen	Copenhagen Airport		
Ecuador	Guayaquil	José Joaquín de Olmedo International Airport		
Ecuador	Quito	Mariscal Sucre International Airport		
Egypt	Cairo	Cairo International Airport	Terminated	
Ethiopia	Addis Ababa	Addis Ababa Bole International Airport	Terminated	
Finland	Helsinki	Helsinki Airport		
Finland	Kittilä	Kittilä Airport	Seasonal	
Finland	Rovaniemi	Rovaniemi Airport	Seasonal	
France	Biarritz	Biarritz Pays Basque Airport		
France	Bordeaux	Bordeaux–Mérignac Airport		
France	Lyon	Lyon–Saint-Exupéry Airport		
France	Marseille	Marseille Provence Airport	Seasonal	
France	Montpellier	Montpellier–Méditerranée Airport		
France	Nantes	Nantes Atlantique Airport		
France	Nice	Nice Côte d'Azur Airport		
France	Paris	Paris Charles de Gaulle Airport		
France	Paris	Paris Le Bourget Airport	Airport closed	
France	Paris	Paris Orly Airport	Terminated	
France	Toulouse	Toulouse–Blagnac Airport		
France	Strasbourg	Strasbourg Airport	Terminated	
Georgia	Tbilisi	Tbilisi International Airport	Terminated	
Germany	Berlin	Berlin Brandenburg Airport		
Germany	Berlin	Berlin Tegel Airport	Airport closed	
Germany	Berlin	Berlin Tempelhof Airport	Airport closed	
Germany	Bremen	Bremen Airport		
Germany	Cologne	Cologne Bonn Airport	Terminated	
Germany	Dresden	Dresden Airport	Terminated	
Germany	Düsseldorf	Düsseldorf Airport		
Germany	Frankfurt	Frankfurt Airport		
Germany	Hamburg	Hamburg Airport		
Germany	Hanover	Hannover Airport		
Germany	Munich	Munich Airport		
Germany	Nuremberg	Nuremberg Airport		
Germany	Stuttgart	Stuttgart Airport		
Ghana	Accra	Accra International Airport		
Greece	Athens	Athens International Airport		
Guatemala	Guatemala City	La Aurora International Airport	Terminated	
Guernsey	Guernsey	Guernsey Airport	Terminated	
Guinea	Conakry	Conakry International Airport	Terminated	
Guyana	Georgetown	Cheddi Jagan International Airport		
Hong Kong	Hong Kong	Hong Kong International Airport		
Hong Kong	Hong Kong	Kai Tak International Airport	Airport closed	
Hungary	Budapest	Budapest Ferenc Liszt International Airport		
India	Bengaluru	Kempegowda International Airport		
India	Delhi	Indira Gandhi International Airport		
India	Hyderabad	Rajiv Gandhi International Airport		
India	Jodhpur	Jodhpur Airport	Terminated	
India	Kolkata	Netaji Subhas Chandra Bose International Airport	Terminated	
India	Mumbai	Chhatrapati Shivaji Maharaj International Airport		
Indonesia	Biak	Frans Kaisiepo Airport	Terminated	
Indonesia	Denpasar	Ngurah Rai International Airport		
Indonesia	Jakarta	Soekarno–Hatta International Airport		
Indonesia	Medan	Polonia International Airport	Airport closed	
Indonesia	Palembang	Sultan Mahmud Badaruddin II International Airport	Terminated	
Indonesia	Surabaya	Juanda International Airport	Terminated	
Iran	Abadan	Abadan–Ayatollah Jami International Airport	Terminated	
Iran	Tehran	Tehran Imam Khomeini International Airport	Terminated	
Iran	Tehran	Tehran Mehrabad International Airport	Terminated	
Iraq	Baghdad	Baghdad International Airport	Terminated	
Iraq	Basra	Basra International Airport	Terminated	
Ireland	Cork	Cork Airport		
Ireland	Dublin	Dublin Airport		
Ireland	Shannon	Shannon Airport	Terminated	
Israel	Tel Aviv	Ben Gurion Airport		
Italy	Bologna	Bologna Guglielmo Marconi Airport		
Italy	Cagliari	Cagliari Elmas Airport		
Italy	Catania	Catania–Fontanarossa Airport		
Italy	Florence	Florence Airport		
Italy	Milan	Milan Linate Airport		
Italy	Milan	Milan Malpensa Airport	Terminated	
Italy	Naples	Naples International Airport		
Italy	Rome	Rome Fiumicino Airport		
Italy	Turin	Turin Airport		
Italy	Venice	Venice Marco Polo Airport		
Italy	Verona	Verona Villafranca Airport	Terminated	
Ivory Coast	Abidjan	Félix-Houphouët-Boigny International Airport	Terminated	
Jamaica	Kingston	Norman Manley International Airport	Terminated	
Japan	Fukuoka	Fukuoka Airport	Terminated	
Japan	Nagoya	Nagoya Komaki Airport	Terminated	
Japan	Osaka	Kansai International Airport		
Japan	Sapporo	New Chitose Airport	Terminated	
Japan	Tokyo	Narita International Airport		
Jersey	Jersey	Jersey Airport	Seasonal	
Jordan	Amman	Amman Civil Airport	Terminated	
Jordan	Amman	Queen Alia International Airport	Terminated	
Kazakhstan	Almaty	Almaty International Airport	Terminated	
Kazakhstan	Astana	Nursultan Nazarbayev International Airport	Terminated	
Kenya	Mombasa	Moi International Airport	Terminated	|
Kenya	Nairobi	Jomo Kenyatta International Airport		
Kuwait	Kuwait City	Kuwait International Airport	Terminated	
Latvia	Riga	Riga International Airport	Terminated	
Lebanon	Beirut	Beirut–Rafic Hariri International Airport	Terminated	
Liberia	Monrovia	Roberts International Airport	Terminated	
Libya	Benghazi	Benina International Airport	Terminated	
Libya	Tripoli	Tripoli International Airport	Terminated	
Luxembourg	Luxembourg City	Luxembourg Airport		
Mauritius	Port Louis	Sir Seewoosagur Ramgoolam International Airport	Terminated	
Malaysia	Kuala Lumpur	Kuala Lumpur International Airport		
Malaysia	Penang	Penang International Airport	Terminated	
Malawi	Lilongwe	Lilongwe International Airport	Terminated	
Mexico	Cancún	Cancún International Airport	Seasonal	
Mexico	Mexico City	Mexico City International Airport		
Morocco	Casablanca	Mohammed V International Airport	Terminated	
Myanmar	Yangon	Yangon International Airport	Terminated	
Namibia	Windhoek	Hosea Kutako International Airport	Terminated	
Netherlands	Amsterdam	Amsterdam Airport Schiphol	Hub	
Netherlands	Eindhoven	Eindhoven Airport	Terminated	
Netherlands	Maastricht	Maastricht Aachen Airport	Terminated	
Netherlands	Rotterdam	Rotterdam The Hague Airport	Terminated	
Nigeria	Abuja	Nnamdi Azikiwe International Airport	Terminated	
Nigeria	Kano	Mallam Aminu Kano International Airport	Terminated	
Nigeria	Lagos	Murtala Muhammed International Airport		
Norway	Ålesund	Ålesund Airport, Vigra		
Norway	Bergen	Bergen Airport		
Norway	Kristiansand	Kristiansand Airport		
Norway	Oslo	Oslo Airport, Fornebu	Airport closed	
Norway	Oslo	Oslo Airport, Gardermoen		
Norway	Sandefjord	Sandefjord Airport, Torp	Terminated	
Norway	Stavanger	Stavanger Airport		
Norway	Trondheim	Trondheim Airport		
Oman	Muscat	Muscat International Airport	Terminated	
Pakistan	Karachi	Jinnah International Airport	Terminated	
Panama	Panama City	Tocumen International Airport		
Peru	Lima	Jorge Chávez International Airport		
Philippines	Manila	Ninoy Aquino International Airport		
Poland	Gdańsk	Gdańsk Lech Wałęsa Airport		
Poland	Katowice	Katowice Airport		
Poland	Kraków	Kraków John Paul II International Airport		
Poland	Poznań	Poznań–Ławica Airport		
Poland	Warsaw	Warsaw Chopin Airport		
Poland	Wrocław	Wrocław Airport		
Portugal	Lisbon	Lisbon Airport		
Portugal	Porto	Porto Airport		
Puerto Rico	San Juan	Luis Muñoz Marín International Airport	Terminated	
Qatar	Doha	Doha International Airport	Airport closed	
Qatar	Doha	Hamad International Airport	Terminated	
Republic of the Congo	Brazzaville	Maya-Maya Airport	Terminated	
Romania	Bucharest	Henri Coandă International Airport		
Russia	Moscow	Sheremetyevo International Airport	Terminated	
Russia	Saint Petersburg	Pulkovo Airport	Suspended	
Rwanda	Kigali	Kigali International Airport		
Saint Kitts and Nevis	Basseterre	Robert L. Bradshaw International Airport	Terminated	
Saudi Arabia	Dammam	King Fahd International Airport		
Saudi Arabia	Dhahran	Dhahran International Airport	Airport closed	
Saudi Arabia	Jeddah	King Abdulaziz International Airport	Terminated	
Saudi Arabia	Riyadh	King Khalid International Airport		
Serbia	Belgrade	Belgrade Nikola Tesla Airport		
Sierra Leone	Freetown	Freetown International Airport	Terminated	
Singapore	Singapore	Changi Airport		
Sint Maarten	Philipsburg	Princess Juliana International Airport		
Slovenia	Ljubljana	Ljubljana Jože Pučnik Airport		
South Africa	Cape Town	Cape Town International Airport		
South Africa	Johannesburg	O. R. Tambo International Airport		
South Korea	Seoul	Incheon International Airport		
Spain	Alicante	Alicante–Elche Miguel Hernández Airport		
Spain	Barcelona	Josep Tarradellas Barcelona–El Prat Airport		
Spain	Bilbao	Bilbao Airport		
Spain	Ibiza	Ibiza Airport	Seasonal	
Spain	Las Palmas	Gran Canaria Airport	Terminated	
Spain	Madrid	Madrid–Barajas Airport		
Spain	Málaga	Málaga Airport		
Spain	Oviedo	Asturias Airport	Seasonal	
Spain	Palma de Mallorca	Palma de Mallorca Airport	Seasonal	
Spain	Santiago de Compostela	Santiago–Rosalía de Castro Airport	Seasonal	
Spain	Valencia	Valencia Airport		
Sri Lanka	Colombo	Bandaranaike International Airport	Terminated	
Sudan	Khartoum	Khartoum International Airport	Terminated	
Suriname	Paramaribo	Johan Adolf Pengel International Airport		
Sweden	Gothenburg	Göteborg Landvetter Airport		
Sweden	Linköping	Linköping/Saab Airport		
Sweden	Malmö	Malmö Airport	Terminated	
Sweden	Stockholm	Stockholm Arlanda Airport		
Sweden	Växjö	Växjö Småland Airport	Terminated	
Switzerland	Geneva	Geneva Airport		
Switzerland	Zürich	Zürich Airport		
Switzerland; France; Germany	Basel; Mulhouse; Freiburg	EuroAirport Basel Mulhouse Freiburg		
Syria	Damascus	Damascus International Airport	Terminated	
Taiwan	Taipei	Taoyuan International Airport		
Tanzania	Dar es Salaam	Julius Nyerere International Airport		
Tanzania	Kilimanjaro	Kilimanjaro International Airport		
Tanzania	Zanzibar	Abeid Amani Karume International Airport	Terminated	
Thailand	Bangkok	Suvarnabhumi Airport		
Thailand	Phuket	Phuket International Airport		
Togo	Lomé	Lomé–Tokoin International Airport	Terminated	
Trinidad and Tobago	Port of Spain	Piarco International Airport		
Tunisia	Tunis	Tunis–Carthage International Airport	Terminated	
Turkey	Ankara	Ankara Esenboğa Airport	Terminated	
Turkey	Istanbul	Atatürk Airport	Airport closed	
Turkey	Istanbul	Istanbul Airport		
Uganda	Entebbe	Entebbe International Airport		
Ukraine	Kyiv	Boryspil International Airport	Suspended	
United Arab Emirates	Abu Dhabi	Zayed International Airport	Terminated	
United Arab Emirates	Dubai	Dubai International Airport		
United Kingdom	Aberdeen	Aberdeen Airport		
United Kingdom	Belfast	Belfast City Airport		
United Kingdom	Belfast	Belfast International Airport	Terminated	
United Kingdom	Birmingham	Birmingham Airport		
United Kingdom	Bristol	Bristol Airport		
United Kingdom	Cardiff	Cardiff Airport		
United Kingdom	East Midlands	East Midlands Airport	Terminated	
United Kingdom	Edinburgh	Edinburgh Airport		
United Kingdom	Exeter	Exeter Airport		
United Kingdom	Glasgow	Glasgow Airport		
United Kingdom	Kingston upon Hull	Hull Municipal Airport	Airport closed	
United Kingdom	Kingston upon Hull	Humberside Airport		
United Kingdom	Inverness	Inverness Airport		
United Kingdom	Leeds/Bradford	Leeds Bradford Airport		
United Kingdom	Liverpool	Liverpool John Lennon Airport	Terminated	
United Kingdom	London	London City Airport		
United Kingdom	London	London Croydon Airport	Airport closed	
United Kingdom	London	London Gatwick Airport	Terminated	
United Kingdom	London	London Heathrow Airport		
United Kingdom	London	London Luton Airport	Terminated	
United Kingdom	London	London Stansted Airport	Terminated	
United Kingdom	Manchester	Manchester Airport		
United Kingdom	Manston	Manston Airport	Airport closed	
United Kingdom	Newcastle upon Tyne	Newcastle Airport		
United Kingdom	Norwich	Norwich Airport		
United Kingdom	Southampton	Southampton Airport		
United Kingdom	Teesside	Teesside Airport		
United States	Anchorage	Ted Stevens Anchorage International Airport	Terminated	
United States	Atlanta	Hartsfield–Jackson Atlanta International Airport		
United States	Austin	Austin–Bergstrom International Airport		
United States	Baltimore	Baltimore/Washington International Airport	Terminated	
United States	Boston	Logan International Airport		
United States	Chicago	O'Hare International Airport		
United States	Dallas/Fort Worth	Dallas Fort Worth International Airport	Terminated	
United States	Detroit	Detroit Metropolitan Airport	Terminated	
United States	Houston	George Bush Intercontinental Airport		
United States	Las Vegas	Harry Reid International Airport		
United States	Los Angeles	Los Angeles International Airport		
United States	Memphis	Memphis International Airport	Terminated	
United States	Miami	Miami International Airport	Seasonal	
United States	Minneapolis–Saint Paul	Minneapolis–Saint Paul International Airport	Seasonal	
United States	New York City	John F. Kennedy International Airport		
United States	Newark	Newark Liberty International Airport	Terminated	
United States	Orlando	Orlando International Airport	Terminated	
United States	Portland, OR	Portland International Airport		
United States	San Diego	San Diego International Airport		
United States	San Francisco	San Francisco International Airport		
United States	Salt Lake City	Salt Lake City International Airport	Seasonal	
United States	Seattle	Seattle–Tacoma International Airport	Terminated	
United States	Washington, D.C.	Washington Dulles International Airport		
Uruguay	Montevideo	Carrasco International Airport	Terminated	
Venezuela	Caracas	Simón Bolívar International Airport	Terminated	
Vietnam	Ho Chi Minh City	Tan Son Nhat International Airport	Terminated	
Yemen	Sanaa	Sanaa International Airport	Terminated	
Zambia	Lusaka	Kenneth Kaunda International Airport	Terminated	
Zimbabwe	Harare	Robert Gabriel Mugabe International Airport	Terminated	

== See also ==
- Air France-KLM
- List of Air France destinations
- List of Scandinavian Airlines destinations
- List of Transavia destinations
- List of Transavia France destinations
