= List of Transavia destinations =

This is a list of scheduled year-round and seasonal destinations served by Dutch low-cost airline Transavia (formerly transavia.com) as of October 2025:

== List ==
Countries in which Transavia (NL) operates as of October 2025

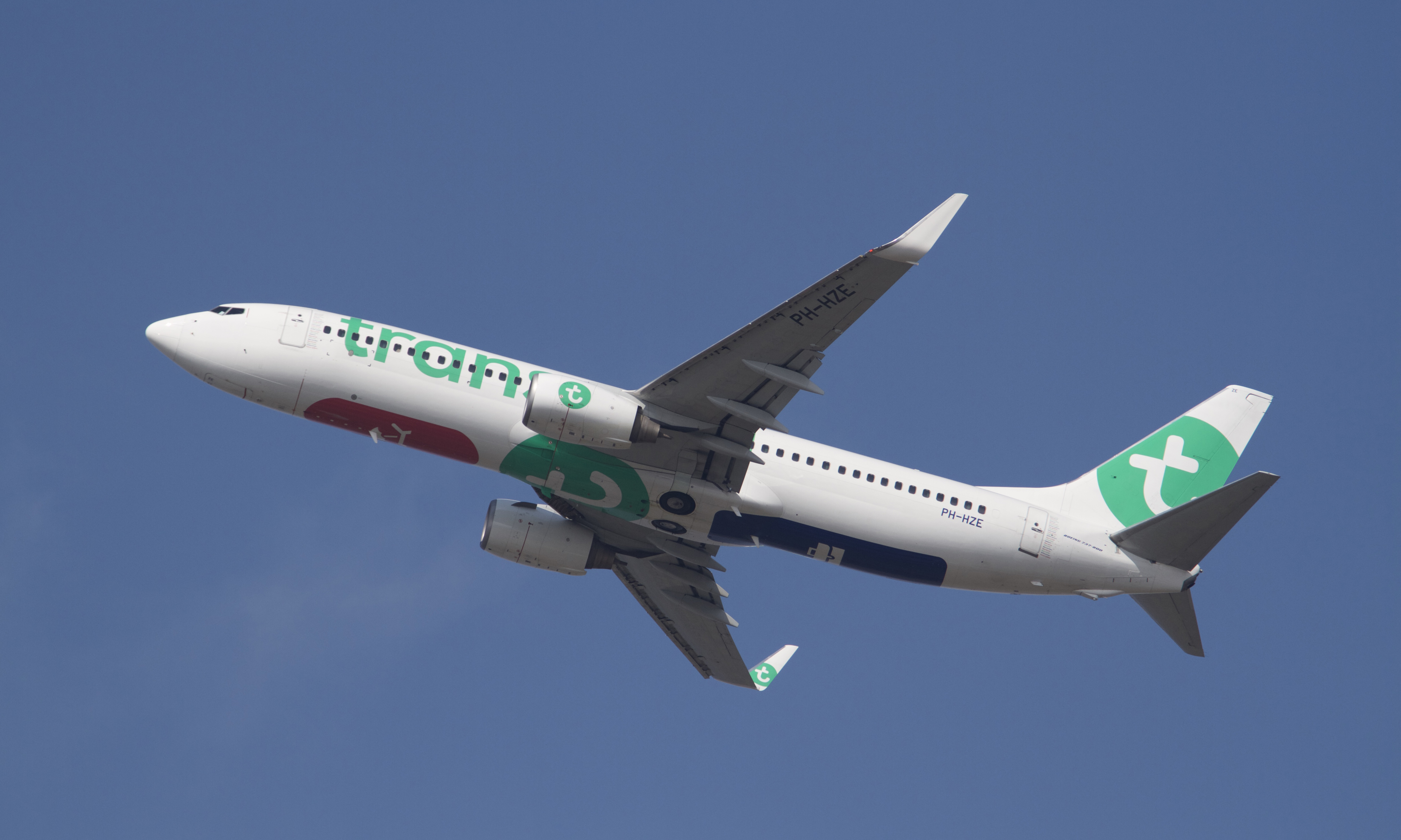
Transavia Boeing 737-800

| Country | City | Airport | Notes | Ref. |
|---|---|---|---|---|
| Austria | Innsbruck | Innsbruck Airport | | |
| Austria | Klagenfurt | Klagenfurt Airport | Terminated | |
| Austria | Salzburg | Salzburg Airport | | |
| Austria | Vienna | Vienna Airport | Terminated | |
| Belgium | Brussels | Brussels Airport | Hub | |
| Bulgaria | Burgas | Burgas Airport | | |
| Bulgaria | Sofia | Sofia Airport | Terminated | |
| Cape Verde | Boa Vista | Aristides Pereira International Airport | Terminated | |
| Cape Verde | Sal | Amílcar Cabral International Airport | | |
| Croatia | Dubrovnik | Dubrovnik Airport | Seasonal | |
| Croatia | Pula | Pula Airport | Seasonal | |
| Croatia | Rijeka | Rijeka Airport | Seasonal | |
| Croatia | Zadar | Zadar Airport | | |
| Cyprus | Larnaca | Larnaca International Airport | | |
| Cyprus | Paphos | Paphos International Airport | | |
| Czech Republic | Prague | Václav Havel Airport Prague | | |
| Denmark | Copenhagen | Copenhagen Airport | | |
| Egypt | Hurghada | Hurghada International Airport | | |
| Finland | Helsinki | Helsinki Airport | Terminated | |
| Finland | Ivalo | Ivalo Airport | | |
| Finland | Kittilä | Kittilä Airport | | |
| Finland | Kuusamo | Kuusamo Airport | | |
| Finland | Rovaniemi | Rovaniemi Airport | | |
| France | Bergerac | Bergerac Dordogne Périgord Airport | | |
| France | Bordeaux | Bordeaux–Mérignac Airport | | |
| France | Chambéry | Chambéry Airport | Seasonal | |
| France | Grenoble | Alpes–Isère Airport | Seasonal | |
| France | Montpellier | Montpellier–Méditerranée Airport | | |
| France | Nantes | Aéroport de Nantes-Atlantique | | |
| France | Paris | Orly Airport | | |
| France | Toulon | Toulon–Hyères Airport | | |
| Greece | Heraklion | Heraklion International Airport | | |
| Greece | Preveza/Lefkada | Aktion National Airport | Seasonal | |
| Greece | Samos | Samos International Airport | Seasonal | |
| Greece | Santorini | Santorini International Airport | | |
| Greece | Zakynthos | Zakynthos International Airport | | |
| Hungary | Budapest | Budapest Ferenc Liszt International Airport | | |
| Iceland | Akureyri | Akureyri Airport | | |
| Iceland | Reykjavík | Keflavík International Airport | | |
| Israel | Eilat | Ramon Airport | Terminated | |
| Israel | Tel Aviv | David Ben Gurion Airport | | |
| Italy | Ancona | Marche Airport | | |
| Italy | Bergamo | Milan Bergamo Airport | | |
| Italy | Brindisi | Brindisi Airport | | |
| Italy | Bologna | Bologna Guglielmo Marconi Airport | | |
| Italy | Perugia | Perugia San Francesco d'Assisi – Umbria International Airport | | |
| Italy | Rome | Rome Fiumicino Airport | | |
| Italy | Venice | Venice Marco Polo Airport | | |
| Jordan | Amman | Queen Alia International Airport | | |
| Latvia | Riga | Riga International Airport | | |
| Lebanon | Beirut | Beirut–Rafic Hariri International Airport | | |
| Morocco | Agadir | Agadir–Al Massira Airport | | |
| Morocco | Al Hoceima | Cherif Al Idrissi Airport | | |
| Morocco | Casablanca | Mohammed V International Airport | | |
| Morocco | Marrakesh | Marrakesh Menara Airport | | |
| Morocco | Nador | Nador International Airport | | |
| Morocco | Oujda | Angads Airport | Seasonal | |
| Morocco | Rabat | Rabat–Salé Airport | | |
| Morocco | Tangier | Tangier Ibn Battouta Airport | | |
| Netherlands | Amsterdam | Amsterdam Airport Schiphol | Hub | |
| Netherlands | Eindhoven | Eindhoven Airport | Hub | |
| Netherlands | Groningen | Groningen Airport Eelde | | |
| Netherlands | Rotterdam/The Hague | Rotterdam The Hague Airport | Hub | |
| North Macedonia | Skopje | Skopje International Airport | | |
| Poland | Kraków | Kraków John Paul II International Airport | | |
| Portugal | Funchal | Cristiano Ronaldo International Airport | | |
| Portugal | Lisbon | Humberto Delgado Airport | | |
| Portugal | Ponta Delgada | João Paulo II Airport | | |
| Portugal | Porto | Francisco Sá Carneiro Airport | | |
| Serbia | Belgrade | Belgrade Nikola Tesla Airport | Terminated | |
| Slovenia | Ljubljana | Ljubljana Jože Pučnik Airport | Seasonal | |
| Spain | Alicante | Alicante–Elche Miguel Hernández Airport | | |
| Spain | Almeria | Almeria Airport | | |
| Spain | Bilbao | Bilbao Airport | | |
| Spain | Fuerteventura | Fuerteventura Airport | | |
| Spain | Girona | Girona–Costa Brava Airport | | |
| Spain | Ibiza | Ibiza Airport | | |
| Spain | La Palma | La Palma Airport | | |
| Spain | Madrid | Adolfo Suárez Madrid–Barajas Airport | | |
| Spain | Málaga | Málaga Airport | | |
| Spain | Reus | Reus Airport | Terminated | |
| Spain | Seville | Seville Airport | | |
| Spain | Tenerife | Tenerife South Airport | | |
| Sweden | Kiruna | Kiruna Airport | Terminated | |
| Sweden | Skellefteå | Skellefteå Airport | | |
| Sweden | Stockholm | Stockholm Arlanda Airport | | |
| Switzerland | Geneva | Geneva Airport | Seasonal | |
| Tunisia | Enfidha | Enfidha-Hammamet International Airport | Terminated | |
| United Arab Emirates | Dubai | Al Maktoum International Airport | | |
| United Kingdom | Edinburgh | Edinburgh Airport | Seasonal | |
| United Kingdom | Glasgow | Glasgow Airport | Terminated | |
| United Kingdom | London | London Stansted Airport | | |

== See also ==
- List of Transavia France destinations
- List of KLM destinations
- List of Air France destinations
