= List of Transavia France destinations =

This is a list of scheduled year-round and seasonal destinations served by French low-cost airline Transavia France (formerly transavia.com France) as of December 2023. The first Transavia flight was on 12 May 2007 between Paris Orly airport to Porto. The airline reaches in the summer 2023 120 short and medium-haul destinations with 100 destinations from Paris Orly.

== Destinations ==
Countries in which Transavia France operates as of April 2025

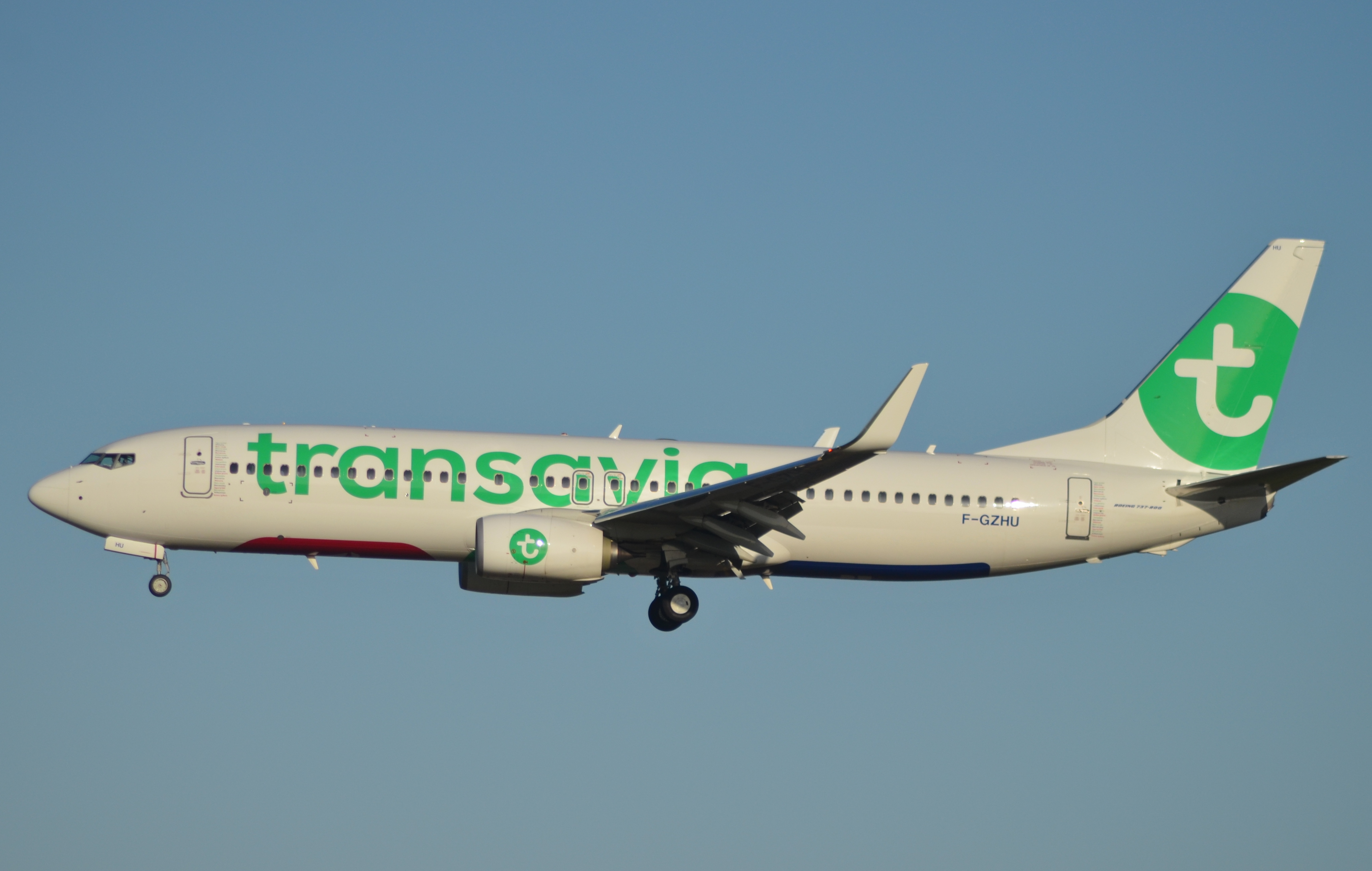
Transavia France Boeing 737-800

Country	City	Airport	Notes	Refs
Albania	Tirana	Tirana International Airport Nënë Tereza		
Algeria	Algiers	Houari Boumediene Airport		
Algeria	Batna	Mostépha Ben Boulaid Airport	Seasonal	
Algeria	Béjaïa	Abane Ramdane Airport	Seasonal	
Algeria	Biskra	Biskra Airport	Seasonal	
Algeria	Constantine	Mohamed Boudiaf International Airport		
Algeria	Oran	Ahmed Ben Bella Airport		
Algeria	Sétif	Ain Arnat Airport		
Algeria	Tlemcen	Zenata – Messali El Hadj Airport		
Armenia	Yerevan	Zvartnots International Airport		
Austria	Vienna	Vienna Airport		
Bosnia and Herzegovina	Sarajevo	Sarajevo International Airport		
Bulgaria	Burgas	Burgas Airport		
Bulgaria	Sofia	Vasil Levski Sofia Airport	Seasonal	
Bulgaria	Varna	Varna Airport	Seasonal	
Cape Verde	Boa Vista	Aristides Pereira International Airport		
Cape Verde	Praia	Nelson Mandela International Airport		
Cape Verde	Sal	Amílcar Cabral International Airport		
Cape Verde	São Vicente	Cesária Évora Airport		
Croatia	Dubrovnik	Dubrovnik Airport		
Croatia	Pula	Pula Airport		
Croatia	Split	Split Airport		
Croatia	Zadar	Zadar Airport	Seasonal	
Cyprus	Larnaca	Larnaca International Airport		
Cyprus	Paphos	Paphos International Airport	Seasonal	
Czech Republic	Prague	Václav Havel Airport Prague		
Denmark	Copenhagen	Copenhagen Airport		
Egypt	Cairo	Cairo International Airport	Seasonal	
Egypt	Sharm El Sheikh	Sharm El Sheikh International Airport	Seasonal	
Egypt	Hurghada	Hurghada International Airport		
Egypt	Luxor	Luxor International Airport	Seasonal	
Estonia	Tallinn	Tallinn Airport		
Finland	Ivalo	Ivalo Airport	Seasonal	
Finland	Kittilä	Kittilä Airport		
Finland	Rovaniemi	Rovaniemi Airport		
France	Ajaccio	Ajaccio Napoleon Bonaparte Airport		
France	Biarritz	Biarritz Pays Basque Airport		
France	Bastia	Bastia – Poretta Airport		
France	Bordeaux	Bordeaux–Mérignac Airport		
France	Brest	Brest Bretagne Airport		
France	Caen	Caen – Carpiquet Airport		
France	Calvi, Haute-Corse	Calvi – Sainte-Catherine Airport		
France	Deauville	Deauville–Normandie Airport	Seasonal	
France	Figari	Figari–Sud Corse Airport		
France	Lille	Lille Airport		
France	Lyon	Lyon–Saint-Exupéry Airport	Base	
France	Marseille	Marseille Provence Airport		
France	Montpellier	Montpellier–Méditerranée Airport	Base	
France	Nantes	Nantes Atlantique Airport	Base	
France	Nice	Nice Côte d'Azur Airport		
France	Paris	Orly Airport	Base	
France	Pau	Pau Pyrénées Airport	Suspended; Winter 24/25	
France	Perpignan	Perpignan–Rivesaltes Airport		
France	Rennes	Rennes–Saint-Jacques Airport		
France	Strasbourg	Strasbourg Airport		
France	Toulon	Toulon–Hyères Airport		
France	Toulouse	Toulouse–Blagnac Airport		
Germany	Berlin	Berlin Brandenburg Airport	Seasonal	
Germany	Munich	Munich Airport		
Georgia	Tbilisi	Tbilisi International Airport		
Greece	Athens	Athens International Airport		
Greece	Cephalonia	Kefalonia International Airport		
Greece	Chania	Chania International Airport	Seasonal	
Greece	Corfu	Corfu International Airport	Seasonal	
Greece	Heraklion	Heraklion International Airport		
Greece	Kalamata	Kalamata International Airport		
Greece	Kos	Kos International Airport		
Greece	Mykonos	Mykonos Airport	Seasonal	
Greece	Preveza	Aktion National Airport	Seasonal	
Greece	Rhodes	Rhodes International Airport	Seasonal	
Greece	Santorini	Santorini (Thira) International Airport		
Greece	Skiathos	Skiathos International Airport	Seasonal	
Greece	Thessaloniki	Thessaloniki Airport		
Greece	Zakynthos	Zakynthos International Airport		
Hungary	Budapest	Budapest Ferenc Liszt International Airport		
Iceland	Reykjavík	Keflavík International Airport		
Ireland	Dublin	Dublin Airport		
Israel	Eilat	Ramon Airport	Seasonal	
Israel	Tel Aviv	David Ben Gurion Airport		
Italy	Alghero	Alghero–Fertilia Airport		
Italy	Ancona	Marche Airport		
Italy	Bari	Bari Karol Wojtyła Airport		
Italy	Cagliari	Cagliari Elmas Airport	Seasonal	
Italy	Catania	Catania–Fontanarossa Airport		
Italy	Comiso	Comiso Airport	Seasonal	
Italy	Lamezia Terme	Lamezia Terme International Airport	Seasonal	
Italy	Olbia	Olbia Costa Smeralda Airport		
Italy	Palermo	Falcone Borsellino Airport		
Italy	Pisa	Pisa International Airport		
Italy	Rome	Leonardo da Vinci–Fiumicino Airport		
Italy	Venice	Venice Marco Polo Airport	Seasonal	
Jordan	Amman	Queen Alia International Airport		
Jordan	Aqaba	King Hussein International Airport		
Latvia	Riga	Riga International Airport		
Lebanon	Beirut	Beirut–Rafic Hariri International Airport		
Luxemburg	Luxemburg	Luxembourg Airport		
Montenegro	Podgorica	Podgorica Airport		
Morocco	Agadir	Agadir–Al Massira Airport		
Morocco	Casablanca	Mohammed V International Airport		
Morocco	Dakhla	Dakhla Airport	Seasonal	
Morocco	Errachidia	Moulay Ali Cherif Airport	Seasonal	
Morocco	Essaouira	Essaouira-Mogador Airport		
Morocco	Fez	Fès–Saïs Airport		
Morocco	Marrakesh	Marrakesh Menara Airport		
Morocco	Nador	Nador Airport		
Morocco	Ouarzazate	Ouarzazate Airport		
Morocco	Oujda	Angads Airport		
Morocco	Rabat	Rabat–Salé Airport		
Morocco	Tangier	Tangier Ibn Battouta Airport		
Netherlands	Amsterdam	Amsterdam Airport Schiphol		
Norway	Oslo	Oslo Airport, Gardermoen		
Norway	Tromsø	Tromsø Airport	Seasonal	
Poland	Kraków	Kraków John Paul II International Airport		
Poland	Wrocław	Wrocław Airport		
Portugal	Faro	Faro Airport		
Portugal	Funchal	Madeira Airport		
Portugal	Lisbon	Lisbon Airport		
Portugal	Ponta Delgada	João Paulo II Airport		
Portugal	Porto	Porto Airport		
Russia	Moscow	Vnukovo International Airport	Terminated	
Saudi Arabia	Jeddah	King Abdulaziz International Airport		
Senegal	Dakar	Blaise Diagne International Airport	Seasonal	
Serbia	Belgrade	Belgrade Nikola Tesla Airport	Terminated	
Slovenia	Ljubljana	Ljubljana Jože Pučnik Airport		
Spain	Alicante	Alicante–Elche Airport	Seasonal	
Spain	Almería	Almería Airport		
Spain	Barcelona	Josep Tarradellas Barcelona–El Prat Airport		
Spain	Bilbao	Bilbao Airport		
Spain	Fuerteventura	Fuerteventura Airport		
Spain	Ibiza	Ibiza Airport		
Spain	Lanzarote	Arrecife Airport		
Spain	Las Palmas	Gran Canaria Airport		
Spain	Madrid	Madrid–Barajas Airport		
Spain	Mahon	Mahon Airport	Seasonal	
Spain	Málaga	Málaga Airport		
Spain	Palma de Mallorca	Palma de Mallorca Airport	Seasonal	
Spain	Santiago de Compostela	Santiago–Rosalía de Castro Airport		
Spain	Seville	San Pablo Airport		
Spain	Tenerife	Tenerife South Airport		
Spain	Valencia	Valencia Airport		
Sweden	Gothenburg	Göteborg Landvetter Airport	Seasonal	
Sweden	Luleå	Luleå Airport	Seasonal	
Sweden	Stockholm	Stockholm Arlanda Airport		
Tunisia	Djerba	Djerba–Zarzis International Airport		
Tunisia	Hammamet, Tunisia	Enfidha–Hammamet International Airport	Terminated	
Tunisia	Monastir	Monastir Habib Bourguiba International Airport		
Tunisia	Sfax	Sfax–Thyna International Airport		
Tunisia	Tozeur	Tozeur–Nefta International Airport	Seasonal	
Tunisia	Tunis	Tunis–Carthage International Airport		
Turkey	Ankara	Ankara Esenboğa Airport		
Turkey	Bodrum	Milas–Bodrum Airport	Seasonal	
Turkey	Istanbul	Istanbul Airport		
Turkey	Istanbul	Istanbul Sabiha Gökçen International Airport	Terminated	
United Arab Emirates	Dubai	Dubai International Airport	Seasonal	
United Kingdom	Glasgow	Glasgow Airport	Terminated	

== See also ==
- List of Air France destinations
- List of KLM destinations
- List of Transavia destinations
