= Welcome Air =

Austrian charter airline

IATA	ICAO	Call sign
—	WLC	WELCOMEAIR
- Founded: May 2000
- Ceased operations: 26 December 2017
- Hubs: Innsbruck Airport
- Fleet size: 1
- Headquarters: Innsbruck, Austria
- Key people: Helmut Wurm (CEO)
- Website: welcomeair.com

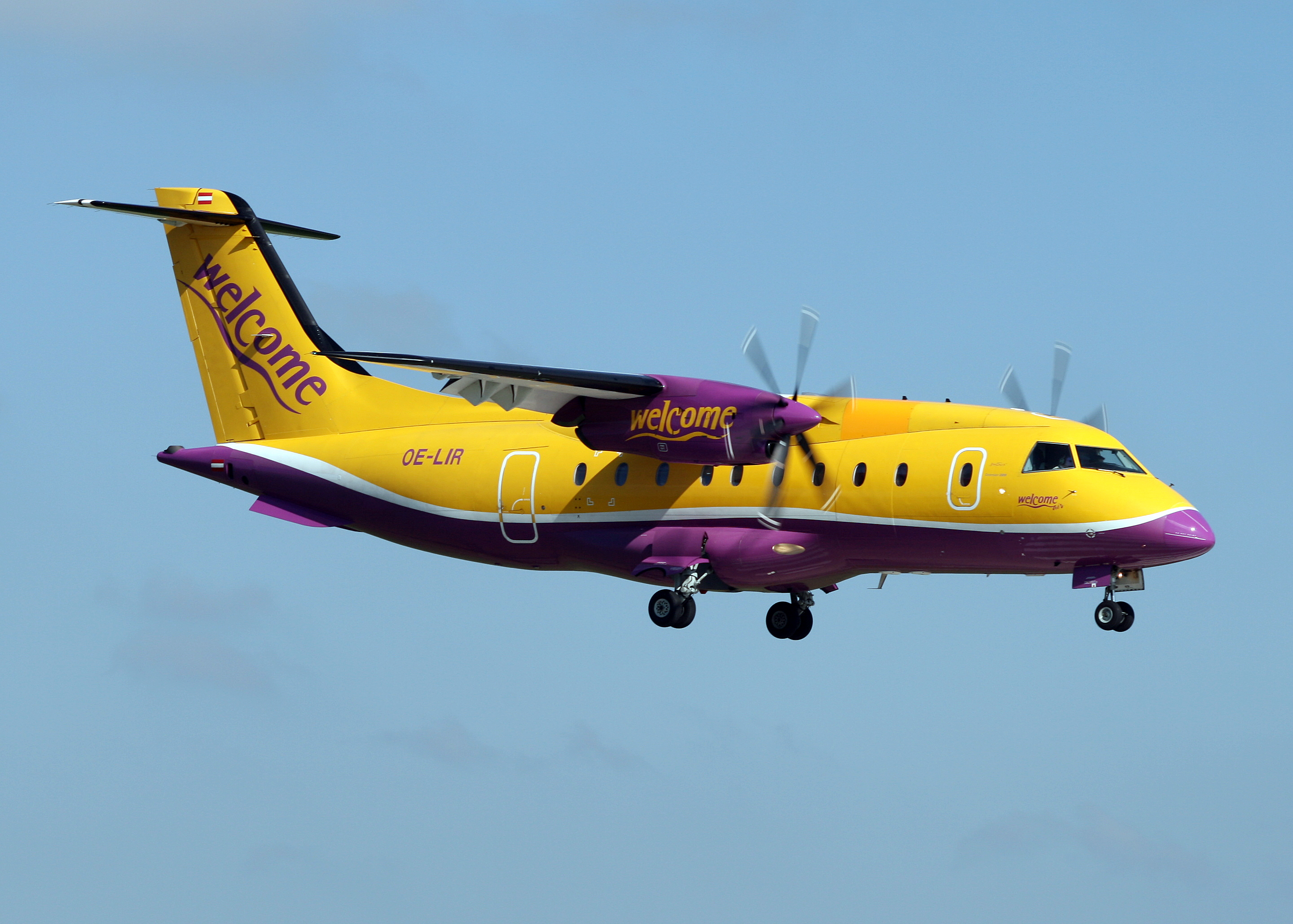
Welcome Air Dornier 328

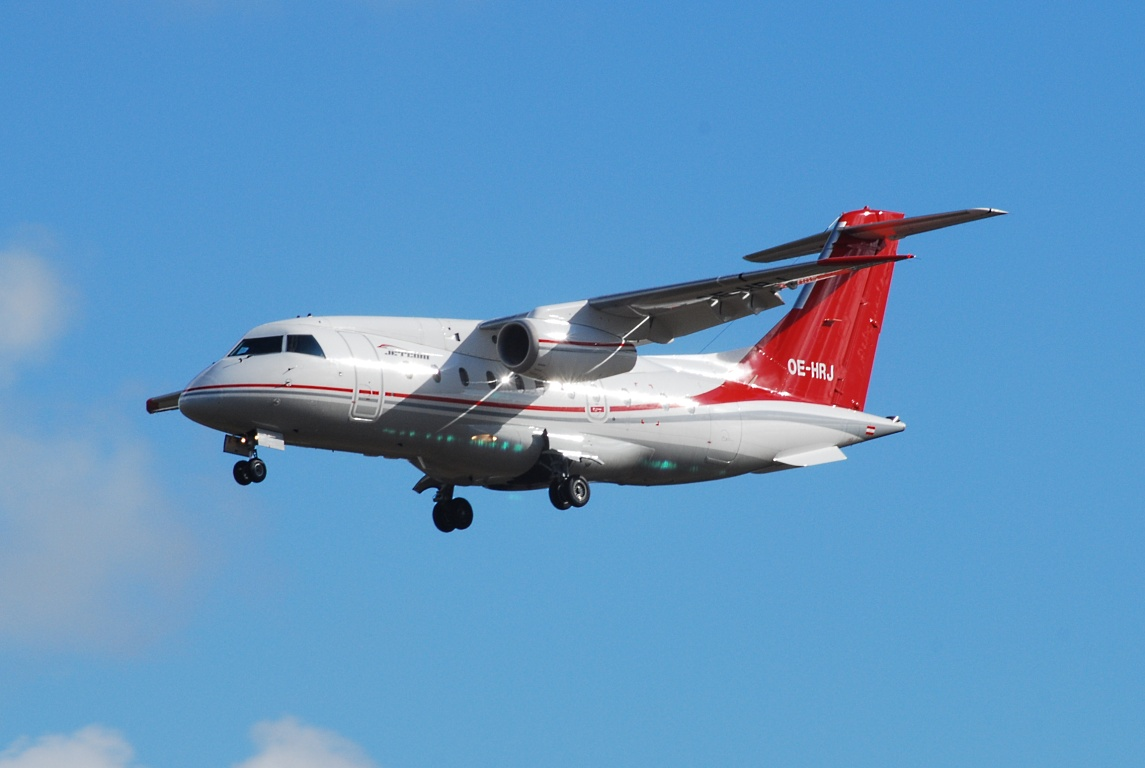
Welcome Air Fairchild Dornier 328JET

Welcome Air, officially Welcome Air Luftfahrt GmbH & Co KG, was an Austrian charter airline with its head office in Innsbruck.

== History ==
On 14 June 1995 Jakob Ringler, since 1983 one of the directors of Tyrolean Air Ambulance (founded 1963 as Aircraft Innsbruck), founded Welcome Air Luftfahrt GmbH.

Through a management buy out in 2000 Tyrolean Air Ambulance (renamed then Tyrol Air Ambulance), which had closely links to the local airline Tyrolean Airways as well as to the helicopter company "Heliair" (formerly "Aircraft Innsbruck"), became part of Jakob Ringler's "Welcome Air" after he took over the majority (in 2011 93,27% belonging to Welcome Air). On 22 May 2000 Welcome Air started its first flight with Do-328 from Innsbruck to Graz.

In 2009 Welcome Air was taken over by Lions Air Group (Switzerland) which also taken over the majority of Air Alps. The umbrella company Welcome Aviation Group set up to merge the companies Tyrol Air Ambulance, Air Alps and Welcome Air and their head offices into one in Innsbruck.

In July 2011 Welcome Aviation Group announced a restructure and therefore Welcome Air will concentrate its activities on business & event charters and will end the year-round Innsbruck - Graz service, but continue the summer operations to Innsbruck/Graz-Olbia and Innsbruck-Nice for a while. Air Alps, which meanwhile ceased operations, concentrated its activities on the Italian schedule operations back then and Tyrol Air Ambulance on its ambulance operations. Meanwhile, Welcome Air ceased all remaining scheduled operations and concentrates entirely on offering European charter services.

In February 2015, Austrian Airlines announced the termination of their wetlease contract with Welcome Air for their Vienna - Linz flights from 31 March 2015. Austrian Airlines had started an airport rail link from Linz to Vienna only months before which was well received, resulting in the five daily flights reduction. Welcome Air subsequently announced a reduction in the fleet size.

On 26 December 2017, Welcome Air operated its last flight, a charter service from Antwerp to Innsbruck, and ceased all operations the day after, marking the end of the airline. The last Dornier 328 aircraft was placed up for sale after its former sister aircraft had already been moved to new operators. Its former subcompany, air rescue and charter service Tyrol Air Ambulance, will continue its operations and added another aircraft to compensate for the closure of Welcome Air.

== Destinations ==
The airline served the scheduled destinations listed below before concentrating on charter operations.

Austria

- Graz - Graz Airport
- Innsbruck - Innsbruck Airport base

Belgium

- Antwerp - Antwerp Airport

Croatia

- Rijeka - Rijeka Airport seasonal

France

- Nice - Nice Côte d'Azur Airport seasonal

Germany

- Hannover - Hannover Airport

Italy

- Olbia - Olbia - Costa Smeralda Airport seasonal

Netherlands

- Rotterdam/The Hague - Rotterdam The Hague Airport

Norway

- Kristiansand - Kristiansand Airport
- Stavanger - Stavanger Airport

Sweden

- Gothenburg - Göteborg Landvetter Airport

== Fleet ==
Welcome Air operated the following aircraft during its existence between 2000 and 2017:

- 3 Dornier 328
- 2 Fairchild Dornier 328JET
