= Air Alps =

Regional airline of Austria (1998–2013)

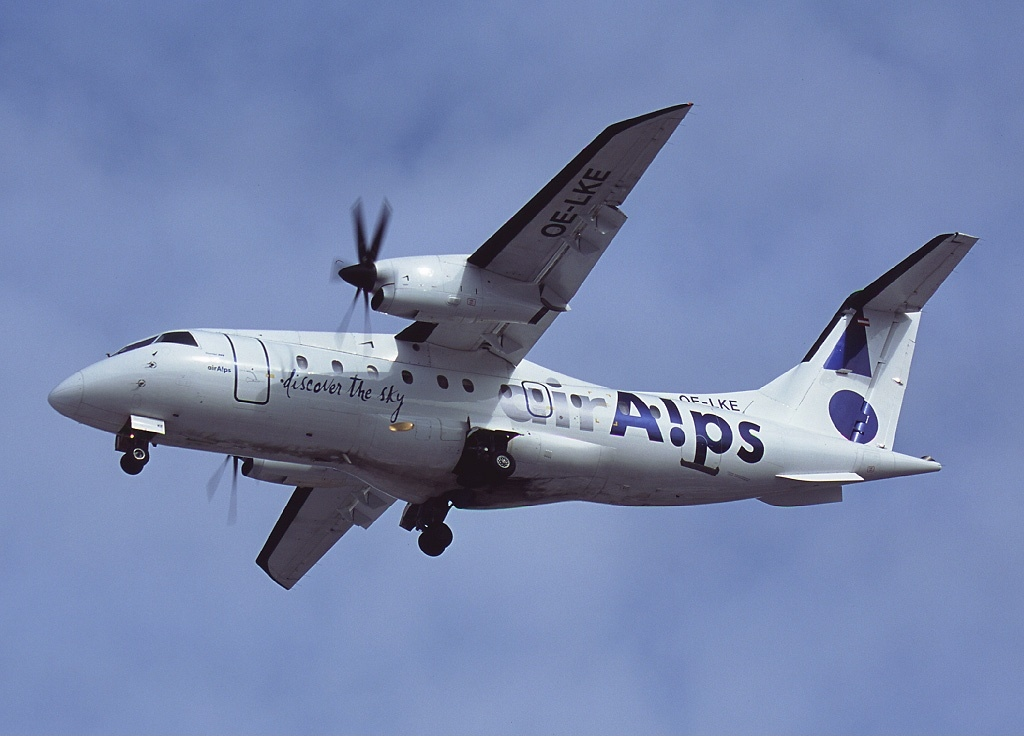
- Dornier 328
IATA	ICAO	Call sign
A6	LPV	ALPAV
- Founded: 1998
- Commenced operations: 1999
- Ceased operations: 2014
- Operating bases: Innsbruck Airport
- Frequent-flyer program: Flying Dutchman
- Parent company: KLM (1999–2001)
- Headquarters: Innsbruck, Austria

Air Alps, (stylized as Air A!ps, previously operating as KLM Alps, legally AAA-Air Alps Aviation), was an Austrian regional airline based in Innsbruck.

== History ==
=== Establishment and early years ===
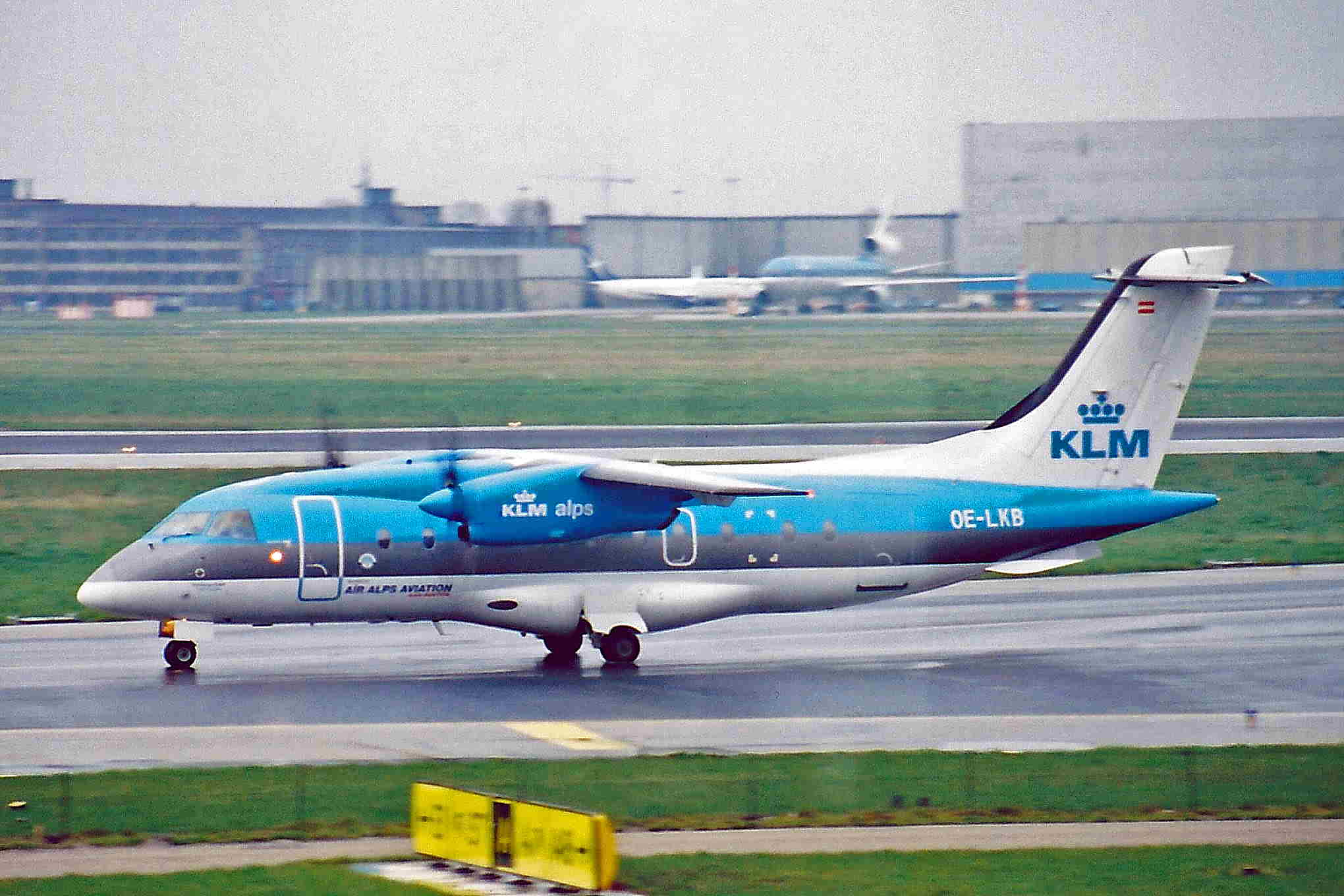
Dornier 328 in KLM Alps colors

Air Alps was founded in 1998 by Air Engiadina (49%) and its manager Dietmar Leitgeb (51%) as Air Alps Aviation Alpenländische Luftfahrt GmbH with its head office in Igls/Innsbruck. Air Alps soon entered into an agreement with the Dutch airline KLM and began operating under the brand name KLM Alps and participating in its frequent-flyer program Flying Dutchman. Flight operations commenced in 1999 from Innsbruck to Salzburg and Amsterdam using two Dornier 328.

In 2000, three more Dornier 328 were added to the fleet and the airline expanded its network with flights from Innsbruck to Vienna and Amsterdam to Linz. A mini-hub was set up in Klagenfurt with flights via Salzburg to Hamburg, Cologne and Amsterdam. However, flights to Hamburg and Cologne were soon dropped. In 2000, Air Alps operated 68 flights per week from Austria to Amsterdam. Additionally, the head office was relocated from the airport to the city. The shares of Air Engiadina were taken over by Dietmar Leitgeb and the capital was increased to €2 million.

The airline entered into a codesharing agreement with Swissair in the winter of 2000 on the new Klagenfurt–Zurich route, and in 2001 for Innsbruck–Zurich. A new uniform was introduced in early 2001, and operations began on the aforementioned Innsbruck-Zürich route and Vienna–Stuttgart.

=== First acquisition and refocus on Italy ===
In the spring of 2001, the company was forced to declare bankruptcy on the back off a €34 million debt. A few months later, an alliance of 28 South-Tyrolean industrialists led by ham producer Franz Senfter acquired 85% of the shares, with the remaining shares purchased by the South Tyrol and Tyrol governments. The new investors made a €7 million capital infusion as Dietmar Leitgeb exited the airline and resigned as CEO. The brand name KLM Alps was dropped and operations resumed under the name Air Alps Aviation with a new corporate identity. The airline was forced to discontinue its codesharing with Swissair and subsequently ceased all flights to Zürich in the autumn of 2001, due to Swissair’s bankruptcy.

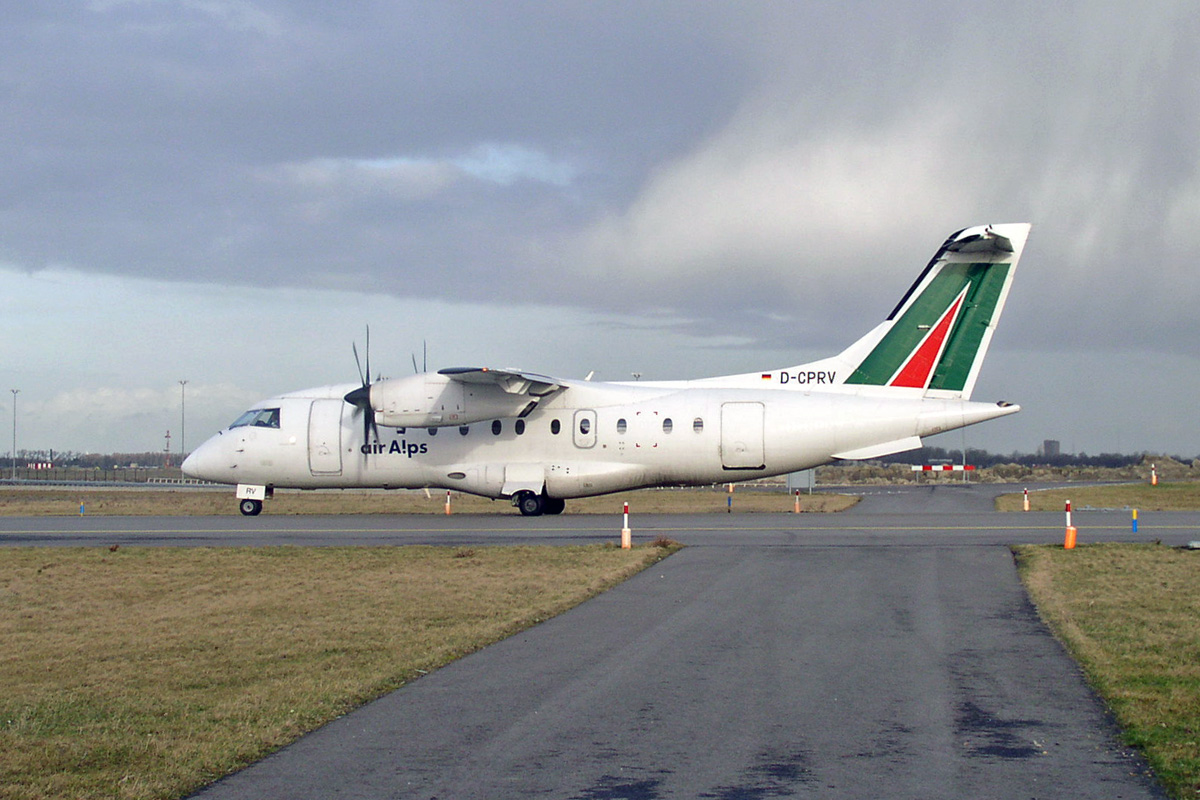
Dornier 328 operated on Alitalia behalf

In 2002, former Alitalia and Alpi Eagles executive Dr. Aldo Bevilaqua was appointed as new CEO. A new strategy was established with a focus on Italy in general and South Tyrol in particular. A base was opened in Bozen with flights to Cagliari, Olbia, Naples and Lamezia Terme in cooperation with Alitalia. In the summer of 2002, Air Alps began codesharing with Austrian Airlines on the route Vienna–Banja Luka and opened new routes from Vienna to Munich, Siena and Olbia as well as from Rome to Stuttgart and Bern. By acquiring a sixth Dornier 328 the company was able to continue its network expansion and open routes from Parma to Rome and Olbia. In 2002, Air Alps was operating two Dornier 328 from Innsbruck, two from Salzburg, one from Linz and one from Bozen.

In 2003, the airline once again introduced new uniforms and acquired a seventh Dornier 328 (OE-LKG) to further expand its network. A new base was established in Bern, and flights began to Amsterdam as well as Elba, followed by additional routes from Zürich to Elba, from Stuttgart to Bologna and Lamezia Terme, from Bozen to Lamezia Terme, and from Bozen to Tortolì via Rome. Plans were made to acquire five more Dornier 328–110, including two from the defunct Minerva Airlines. At the same time, Air Alps ended its cooperation with City Air on the route Berlin-Tegel–Linz–Salzburg.

The airline's capital was increased again in 2003 by €16 million, and in 2004 flights began from Bozen to Munich in cooperation with Lufthansa. A new base in Brescia was planned, while flights from Bologna to Lamezia Terme were terminated.

By 2004, the airline carried 400,000 passengers annually, up from 190,000 in 2001, 180,000 in 2000 and 72,000 in 1999.

=== Second acquisition and merger with Welcome Air ===
On 4 June 2009, settlement proceedings over Air Alps began in the regional court of Innsbruck. In December that year the airline was taken over by Welcome Air which acquired 76% of the company. The remaining shares were kept by the South Tyrolean consortium, the Trentino-Alto Adige/Südtirol region and Südtiroler Transportstrukturen AG (STA).

Due to financial problems, Air Alps ceased all flight operations on 13 January 2012 until further notice. Welcome Air relocated the entire Air Alps fleet to Innsbruck. On 1 February, flights resumed from Bozen to Rome. Shortly thereafter, the route was once again cancelled and Air Alps began exclusively operating charter flights until November.

In June 2013, the airline ceased all flight operations again., and on 20 August 2013, its owners decided to liquidate the company following an unsuccessful search for new investors. All employees were dismissed by October 2013.

=== Third acquisition and future plans ===
In November 2013, a group of investors expressed interest in acquiring Air Alps, and on 3 February 2014, the airline resumed flights between Zürich and Bremen using a single aircraft. The route was operated on behalf of Rostock Airways and commenced almost a year after the airline had previously ceased operations. However, operations were halted on 28 February 2014 as takeover negotiations collapsed. In October that year, Welcome Air's shares in Air Alps were acquired by a new investor which began a restructuring process. After that, nothing happened and the airline never flew again.

== Destinations ==
Air Alps offered scheduled flights from Bozen and Parma to Rome. During the summer season the airline also operated flights to Olbia on Sardinia. Additionally, the airline operated charter flights to holiday destinations in Italy, and the aircraft were leased to airlines such as Alitalia and Cirrus Airlines. Air Alps also operated the route Linz–Vienna 33 times per week for Austrian Airlines.

=== Codesharing ===
Air Alps had codesharing agreements with Alitalia and Austrian Airlines, and previously with KLM, Swissair, Swiss International Air Lines and City Air.

== Fleet ==
Air Alps operated a fleet of 7 Dornier 328 32-seat airliners for the duration of its operations.
