= Innsbruck Airport =

Airport in Innsbruck, Tyrol, Austria

Innsbruck Airport Flughafen Innsbruck

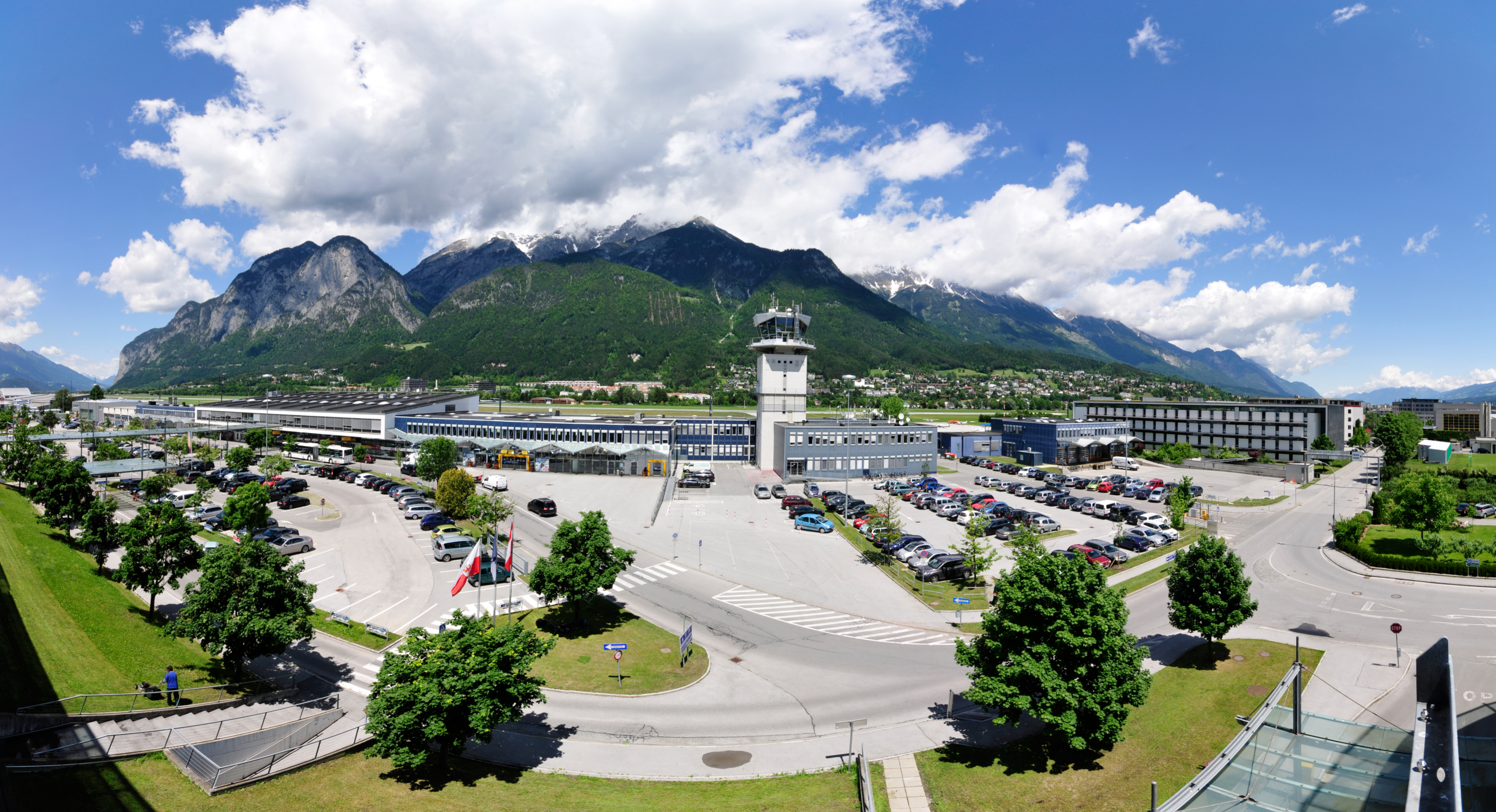
- IATA: INN; ICAO: LOWI

Summary
- Owner: Tiroler Flughafenbetriebs GmbH
- Serves: Innsbruck
- Location: Kranebitten, Tyrol, Austria
- Opened: 15 January 1948; 78 years ago
- Elevation AMSL: 1,906 ft (581 m)
- Coordinates: 47°15′37″N 011°20′38″E
- Website: www.innsbruck-airport.com

Map
- Location within Austria

Runways
Direction	Length		Surface
Direction	ft	m	Surface
08/26	6,562	2,000	Asphalt

Statistics (2025)
- Passengers: 882,876 ▲+2.4%
- Aircraft movements: 7,516 ▼-0.8%
- Cargo (metric tons): 0 ±0.0%
- Source: Statistics Austria

Innsbruck Airport (IATA: INN, ICAO: LOWI), also known locally as Kranebitten Airport, is the largest international airport in Tyrol in western Austria. It is located approximately 4 kilometres (2 1/2 mi) from the centre of Innsbruck.

The airport, which was opened in 1925, handles regional flights around the Alps, as well as seasonal international traffic to further European destinations. During the winter, activity increases significantly, due to the high number of skiers travelling to the region.

== Operations ==
=== Terminal ===
The terminal has no jet bridges: instead, mobile stairs are used for boarding large aircraft that do not have their own airstairs. The airport can handle aircraft up to the size of a Boeing 767. In February 2017, the airport announced plans to replace the passenger terminal, which had opened for the 1964 Winter Olympics, with a new and larger building. An architecture competition began in early 2020 but was called off that June because of the COVID-19 pandemic. Planning resumed in 2023. The airport estimated the cost at around €100 million.

=== Special approach procedures ===
Innsbruck Airport is characterized by a difficult landing approach due to surrounding terrain, prohibiting certain aircraft types from operating at the airport. The approach and descent is a very complicated process—the Alps create vicious winds and currents, which pilots have to deal with throughout the process. It is a Category C airport, an airport with special difficulties requiring pilots to have special training before using it. Approach or ascent over the eastern end of the runway goes over the inner city at fairly low altitude.

=== Tenants ===
Innsbruck Airport served as the base of Tyrolean Airways and Welcome Air until their demise, although the newly established independent technical division Tyrolean Airways Luftfahrzeuge Technik GmbH remains here. Innsbruck also used to accommodate the head offices of Air Alps.

== Airlines and destinations ==
The following airlines offer regular scheduled and charter flights at Innsbruck Airport:

Airlines	Destinations
Aegean Airlines	Seasonal: Athens
Air Dolomiti	Seasonal: Frankfurt
Austrian Airlines	Vienna; Seasonal: Amsterdam, Billund, Brussels, Copenhagen, Warsaw–Chopin
Avanti Air	Seasonal charter: Calvi
British Airways	Seasonal: London–City, London–Gatwick, London–Heathrow
easyJet	London–Gatwick; Seasonal: Birmingham, Bristol, Edinburgh, London–Luton, Manchester
Eurowings	Seasonal: Hamburg, Karpathos, Kos, Lamezia Terme, Stockholm–Arlanda; Seasonal charter: Copenhagen, Düsseldorf, Heraklion, Palma de Mallorca, Rhodes
Finnair	Seasonal: Helsinki
Iberia	Seasonal: Madrid
Icelandair	Seasonal: Reykjavík–Keflavík
Jet2.com	Seasonal: Birmingham, Bristol, Edinburgh, London–Stansted (begins 19 December 2026), Manchester
Marathon Airlines	Seasonal charter: Cagliari, Kalamata, Preveza/Lefkada
Scandinavian Airlines	Seasonal: Copenhagen, Stockholm–Arlanda
Transavia	Amsterdam; Seasonal: Eindhoven, Rotterdam/The Hague
TUI Airways	Seasonal: Birmingham, Bristol, Dublin, Edinburgh, London–Gatwick, London–Stansted, Manchester, Newcastle upon Tyne
TUI fly Belgium	Seasonal: Brussels
Universal Air	Seasonal charter: Corfu, Kalamata, Kefalonia, Preveza, Rimini

== Statistics ==
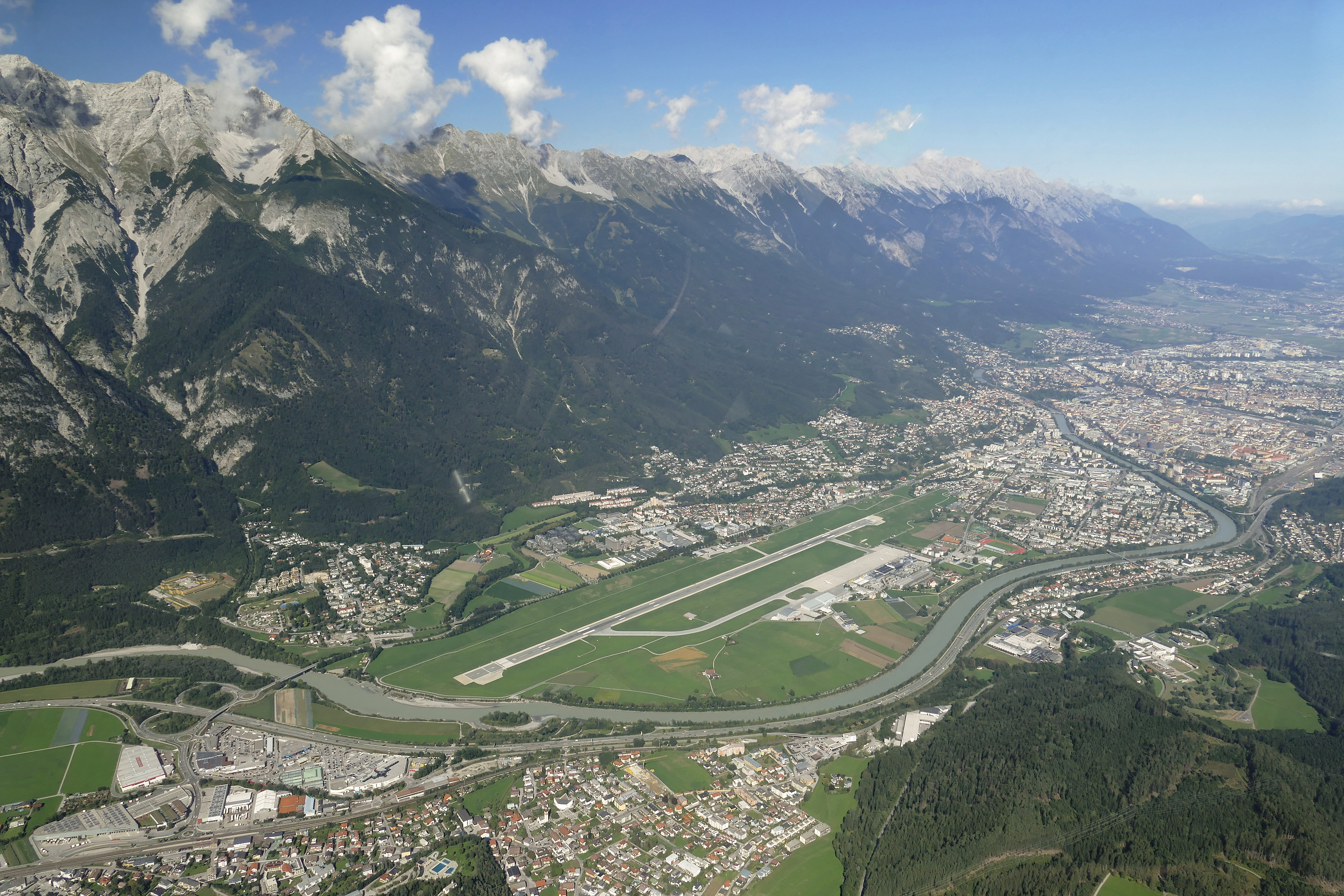
Aerial view of the airport and its surrounding mountains.

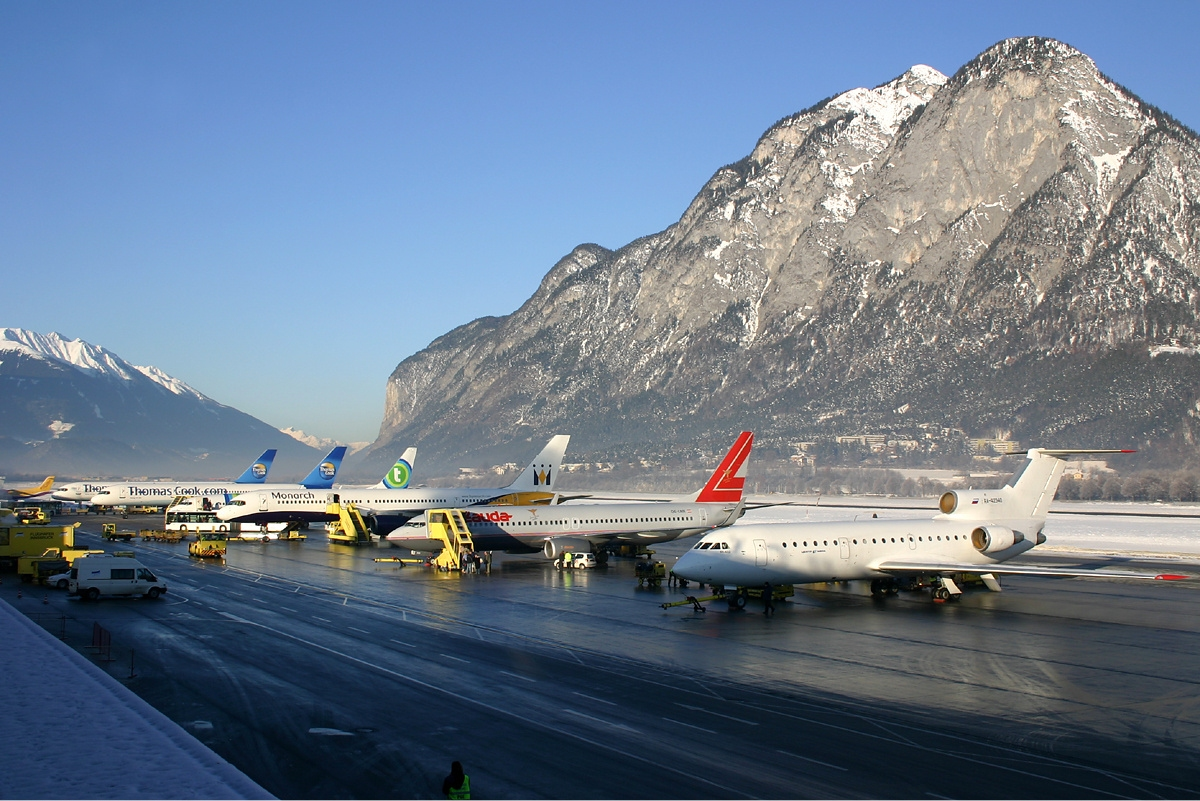
Apron during the winter season

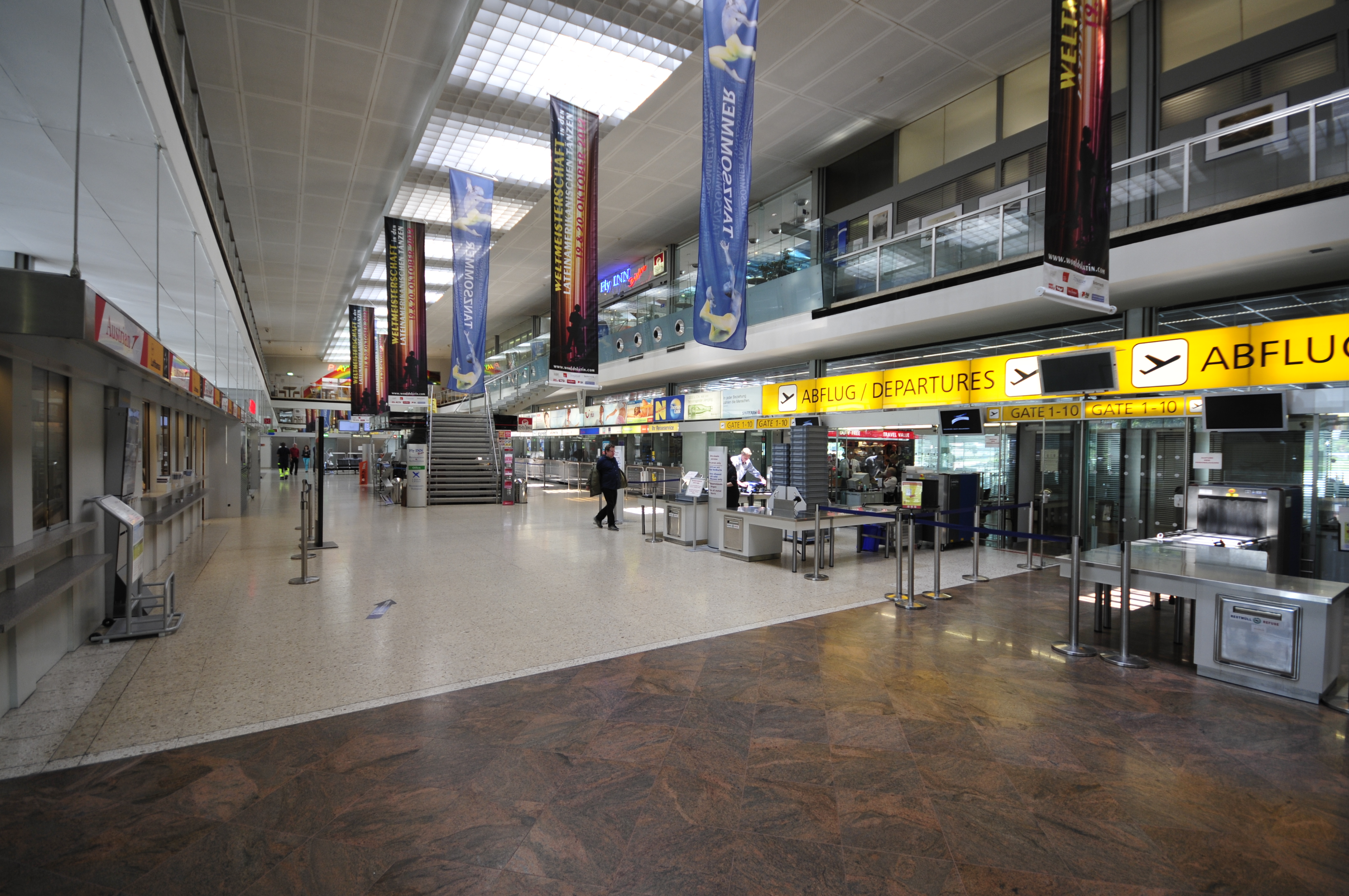
Terminal interior

Passenger statistics
Year	Total passengers	% change
2007	859,832	Steady
2008	969,474	▲12.8
2009	956,972	▼1.3
2010	1,033,512	▲8.0
2011	997,020	▼3.5
2012	930,850	▼6.6
2013	981,118	▲5.4
2014	991,356	▲1.0
2015	1,001,255	▲1.0
2016	1,006,738	▲0.6
2017	1,092,547	▲8.5
2018	1,119,347	▲2.4
2019	1,144,541	▲2.3
2020	487,437	▼57.4
2021	125,495	▼74.3
2022	721,412	▲474.9
2023	906,655	▲25.7
2024	862,202	▼4.9
2025	882,876	▲2.4

== Ground transportation ==
The airport is connected to the city and to Innsbruck Hauptbahnhof by city bus F. The bus runs every 15 minutes and takes 18 minutes to reach the city.

== See also ==
- Transport in Austria
- List of airports in Austria
