= Kittilä Airport =

Airport in Lapland, Finland

Kittilä Airport Kittilän lentoasema

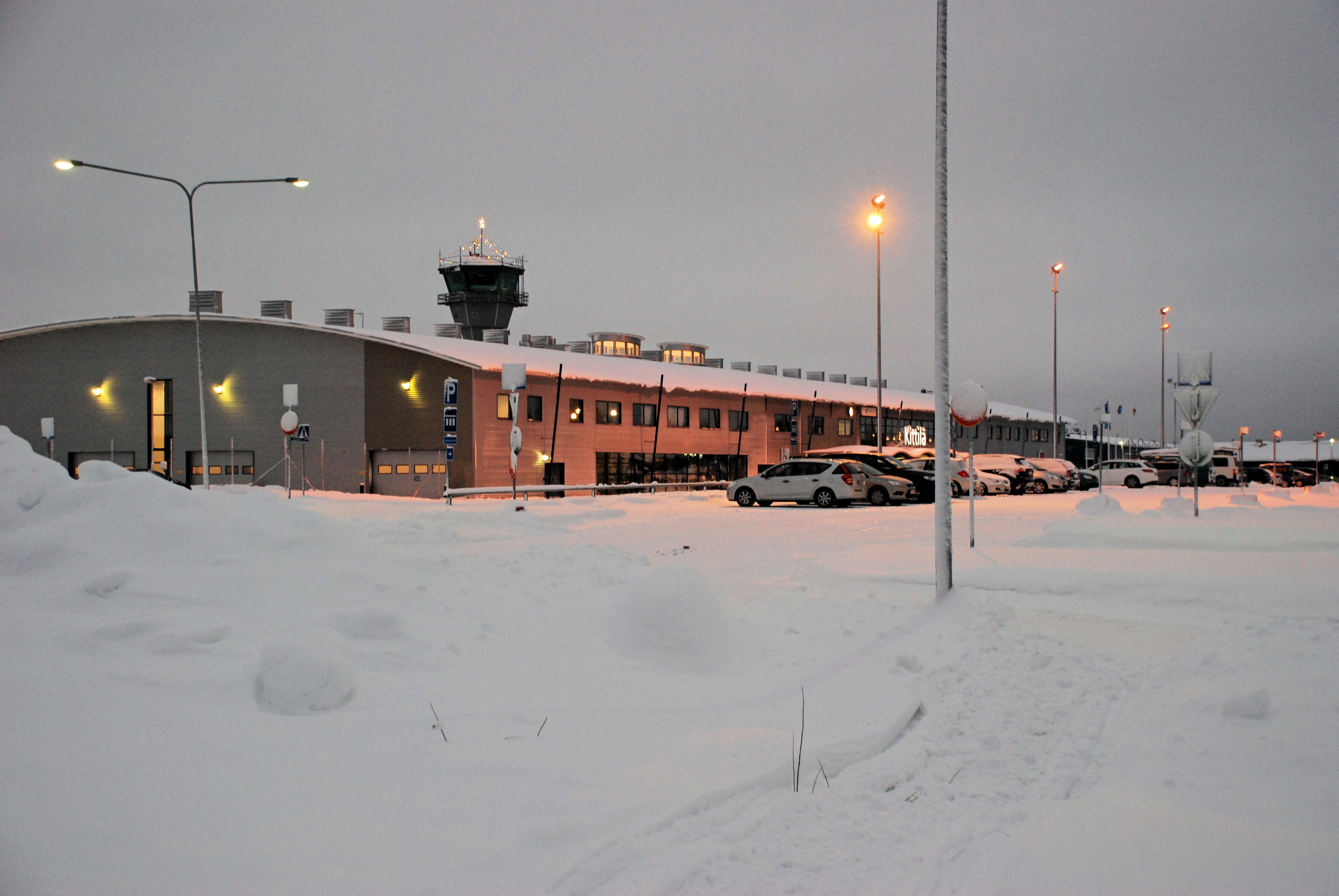
- IATA: KTT; ICAO: EFKT

Summary
- Airport type: Public
- Operator: Finavia
- Serves: Kittilä, Lapland, Finland
- Time zone: EET (UTC+2)
  - Summer (DST): EEST (UTC+3)
- Elevation AMSL: 196 m (643 ft)
- Coordinates: 67°41′55″N 024°50′53″E
- Website: finavia.fi

Map
- Location within Finland

Runways
Direction	Length		Surface
Direction	m	ft	Surface
16/34	2,500	8,202	Asphalt

Statistics (2025)
- Passengers: 445,911
- Passenger change 24–25: ▲ +8.3%
- Landings: 2,198
- Source: AIP Finland

Kittilä Airport (IATA: KTT, ICAO: EFKT), Finnish: Kittilän lentoasema, is a Finnish airport located in Kittilä inside the Arctic Circle. It handles general aviation and mostly seasonal international traffic and is one of the main airports in Northern Finland. During the winter, Kittilä receives visitors from countries such as Germany, France, United Kingdom, Ukraine, The Netherlands, Switzerland, Spain and Canada. The airport serves the nearby ski resorts of Levi and Ylläs. It carried 363,161 passengers in 2019 and 206,251 passengers in 2020 (due to COVID-19) being the fourth busiest airport in Finland.

== Airlines and destinations ==
The following airlines operate regular scheduled and charter flights at Kittilä Airport:

Airlines	Destinations
Aer Lingus	Seasonal charter: Dublin
Air France	Seasonal: Paris–Charles de Gaulle
Animawings	Seasonal: Bucharest–Otopeni
Austrian Airlines	Seasonal: Vienna
Corendon Dutch Airlines	Seasonal charter: Amsterdam
Centrum Air	Seasonal: Tashkent (begins 26 December 2026)
Discover Airlines	Seasonal: Frankfurt
EasyJet	Seasonal: London–Gatwick, Manchester, Milan–Malpensa, Paris–Charles de Gaulle
Edelweiss Air	Zurich
Eurowings	Seasonal: Berlin, Düsseldorf, Hamburg
Finnair	Alta, Helsinki
Helvetic Airways	Seasonal: Zurich
KLM	Seasonal: Amsterdam
Lufthansa	Seasonal: Munich
Scandinavian Airlines	Seasonal: Copenhagen
Transavia	Seasonal: Paris–Orly
TUI Airways	Seasonal: Birmingham, Bristol, Dublin, East Midlands, Glasgow, London–Gatwick, Manchester, Newcastle upon Tyne
TUI fly Belgium	Seasonal: Brussels
TUI fly Netherlands	Seasonal: Amsterdam, Rotterdam/The Hague

== Statistics ==
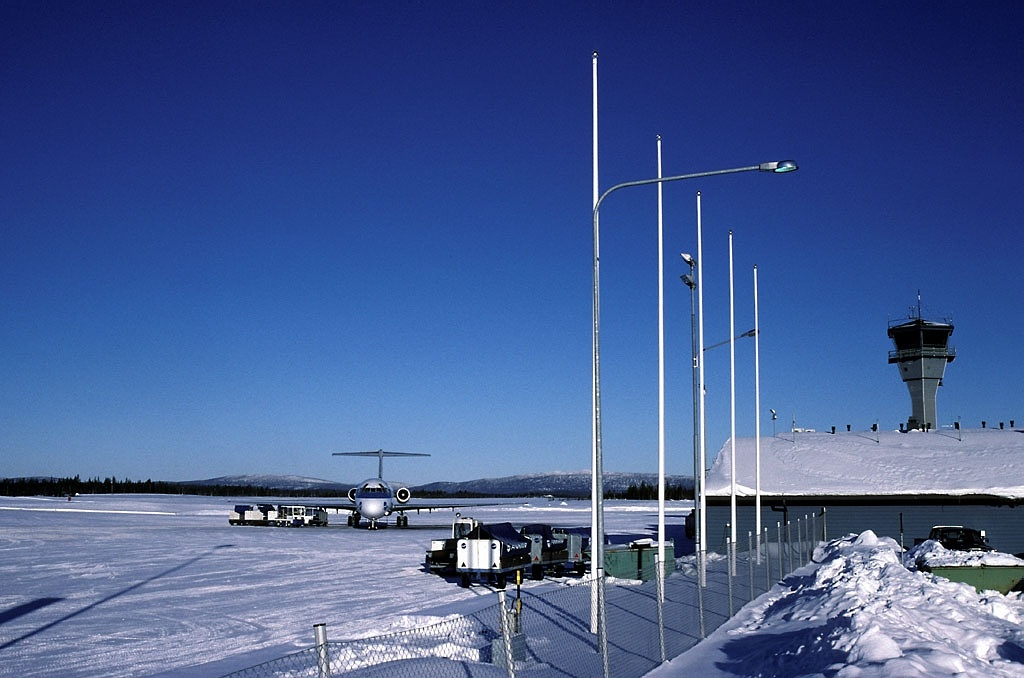
Apron view

Four busiest routes by passengers handled
Rank	Airport	Passengers (2015)	Operators
1.	Helsinki, Finland	▼109,855	Finnair, Nordic Regional Airlines, Norwegian Air Shuttle, Scandinavian Airlines
2.	Ivalo, Finland	▲30,911	Finnair
3.	London–Gatwick, United Kingdom	▲18,970	easyJet, Finnair, TUI Airways
4.	Manchester, United Kingdom	▲18,093	Jet2.com, TUI Airways

=== Passengers ===
Annual passenger statistics for Kittilä Airport
Year	Domestic passengers	International passengers	Total passengers	Change
1983			1,821	
1985			280	
1990			21,103	
1995			76,002	
1998	115,651	12,247	127,898	
1999	110,128	17,808	127,936	+0,0% ▲
2000	143,627	26,455	170,082	+32.9% ▲
2001	145,757	35,781	181,538	+6.7% ▲
2002	146,408	51,083	197,491	+8.8% ▲
2003	144,482	69,300	213,782	+8.2% ▲
2004	161,854	77,109	238,963	+11.8% ▲
2005	155,008	73,513	228,521	−4.4% ▼
2006	153,264	91,820	245,084	+7.2% ▲
2007	145,675	96,291	241,966	−1.3%▼
2008	164,136	101,259	265,395	+9.7% ▲
2009	165,926	79,387	245,313	−7.6% ▼
2010	142,197	72,179	214,376	−12.6% ▼
2011	167,484	71,054	238,538	+11.3% ▲
2012	186 184	77 202	263 386	+10.4% ▲
2013	157 465	79 757	237 222	−9.9% ▼
2014	153 011	81 722	234 733	−1.0% ▼
2015	140 831	85 988	226 819	−3.4% ▼
2016	148,274	109,263	257,537	+13.5% ▲
2017	183,952	141,101	325,053	+26.2% ▲
2018	208,835	145,726	354,561	+9.1% ▲
2019	214,357	148,804	363,161	+2.4% ▲
2020	128,093	78,158	206,251	-43.2% ▼
2021	118,618	63,869	182,487	-11.5% ▼
2022	175,527	161,671	337,198	+84.8% ▲
2023	184,005	190,621	374,626	+11.1% ▲
2024	199,420	212,298	411,718	+9.9% ▲
2025	189,189	256,722	445,911	+8.3% ▲

=== Cargo ===
Handled freight and mail at Kittilä Airport in tons
Year	Domestic freight	Domestic mail	International freight	International mail	Total freight and mail	Change
2005	25	0	0	0	25	−7% ▼
2006	26	1	0	0	27	+8% ▲
2007	14	0	0	0	14	−48% ▼
2008	13	0	0	0	13	−7% ▼
2009	11	0	0	0	11	−15% ▼

== Incidents and accidents ==
- On 27 July 2006, a fire broke out around 19:00 between the old terminal building and the new unfinished section of the new terminal. The airport was ready and operational again in December 2006, with the new terminal open.
- On 4 January 2018, a Gulfstream G150 aircraft registered to Austria and carrying Russian passengers was being prepared for take-off to return to Russia when due to pressure built inside the aircraft the door slammed on the German captain during exterior inspection killing him instantly. There were no passengers in the aircraft.
- On 28 December 2025, a Nextant 400XT jet and a Swiss International Air Lines aircraft that landed from Geneva Airport carrying 150 passengers were blown off the runway into a pile of snow while taxiing due to strong winds caused by Storm Johannes. No injuries were reported.

== See also ==
- List of the busiest airports in the Nordic countries
- Levi, Finland
