= Aakenustunturi =

Fell in Kittilä, Finland

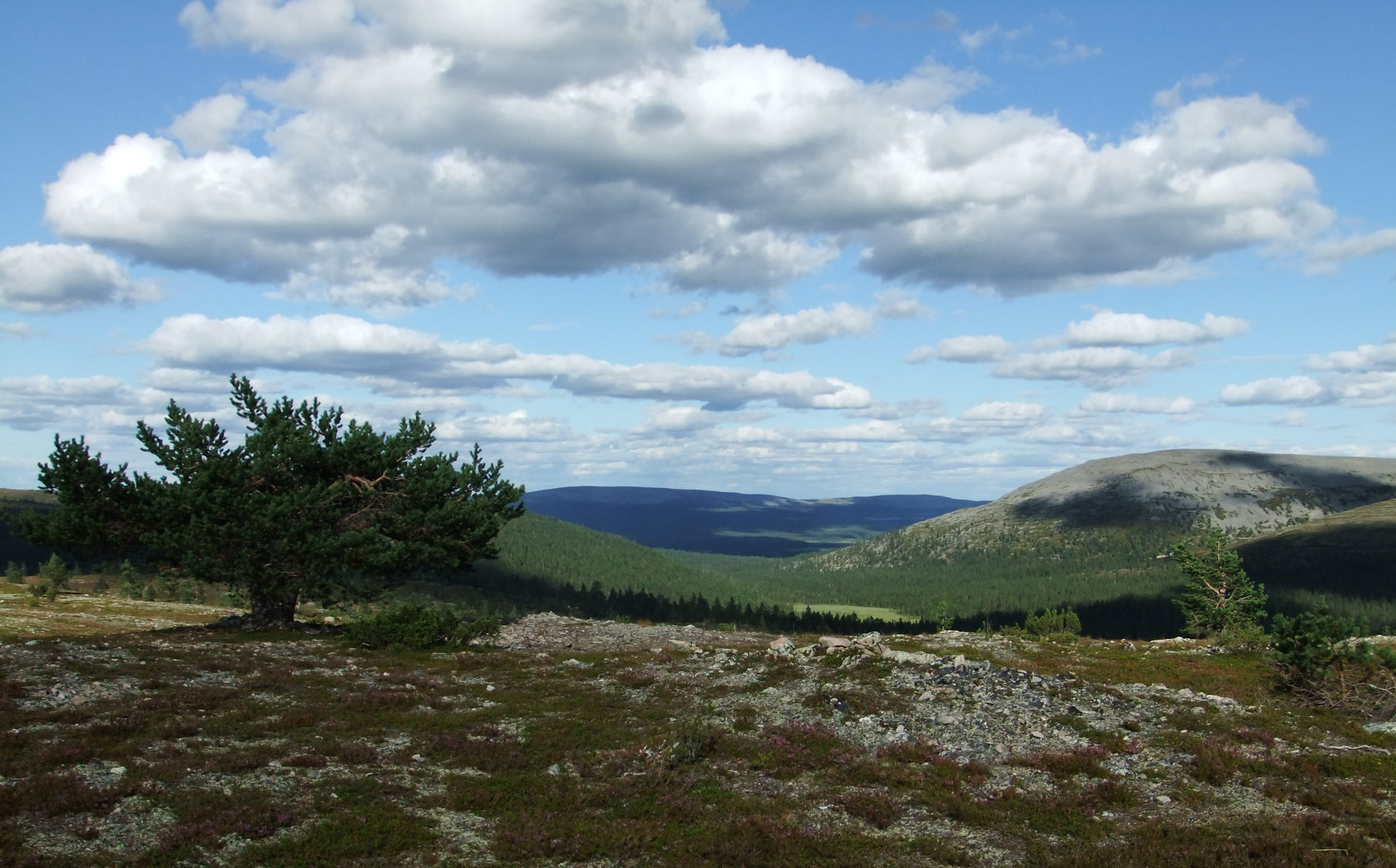
- Aakenustunturi as seen from Kukastunturi.

Highest point
- Coordinates: 67°41′30″N 24°27′56″E

Geography
- Location within Finland
- Location: Kittilä, Lapland, Finland

Aakenustunturi is a fell in Kittilä in northern Finland. It has an elevation of 570 metres (1,870 ft) and is located near Mount Ylläs.

== History ==
The fell had two fatal airplane crashes during World War II.

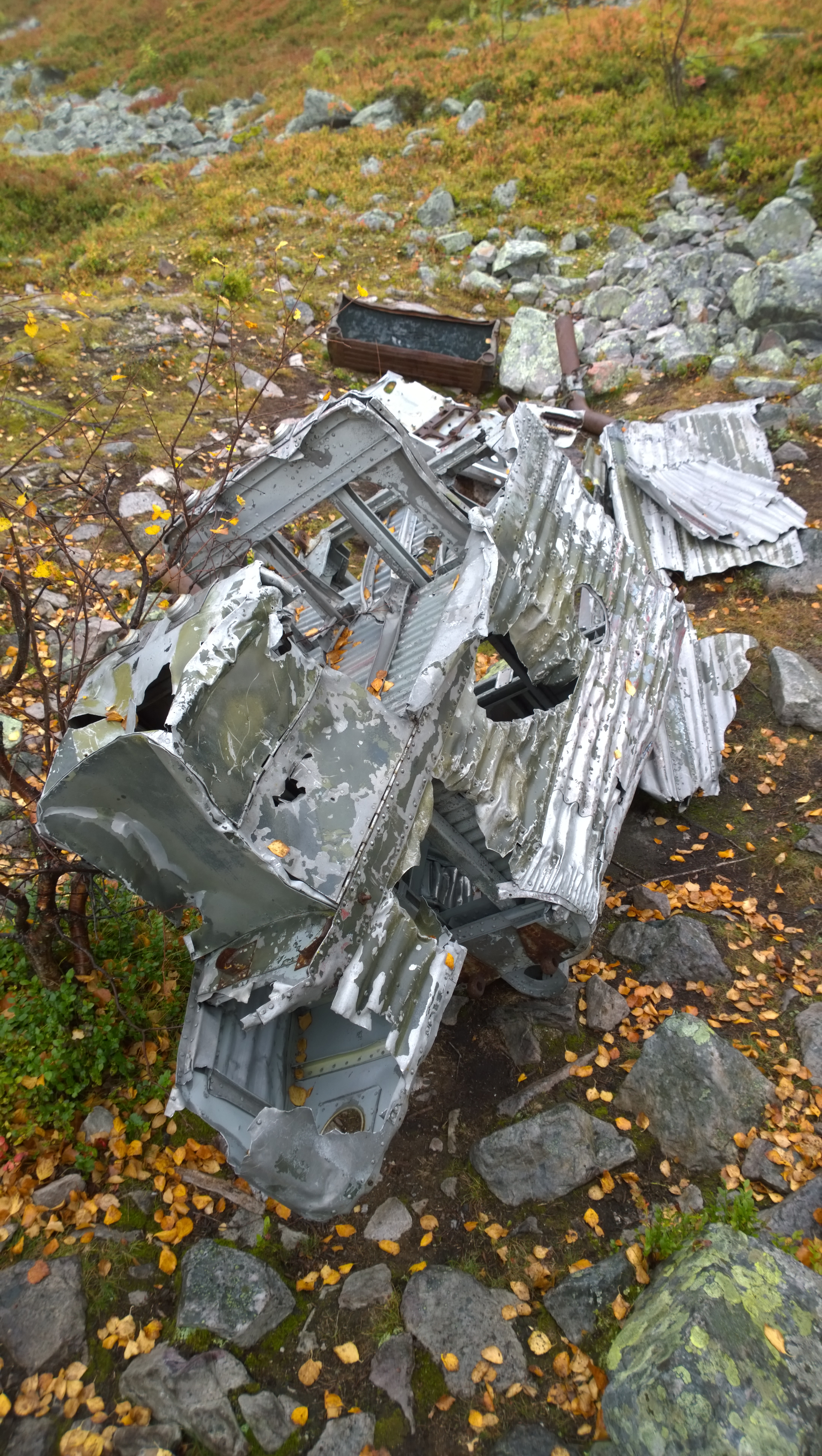
Remains of the Junkers Ju 52, 2015

On 24 February 1943, a Junkers Ju 52 of the German Luftwaffe was shot down and crashed into the fell.

Later, during the Lapland War, Air Force Captain Paavo Kahla, a Knight of the Mannerheim Cross and Sergeant Jouko Liinamaa went missing on a reconnaissance flight on October 23, 1944. Their remains were found by a reindeer herder, alongside their shot down Fokker C.X in spring 1945.

== Landscape ==
The fell is considered a wild oasis between the fells in the north and is a popular destination for hikers. In December 2004, the fell was incorporated into the Pallas-Yllästunturi National Park.

== See also ==
- Levi, Finland
