= Silvilization =

Ecological philosophy

Silvilization is a conceptual framework or a vision of the world whereby the forest, a metaphor for primordial living, is the best place for human development and fulfilment. It is a portmanteau of the Latin word silva, meaning forest, and civilization.

== History ==
The term was first coined by Pierre-Doris Maltais, leader of the Iriadamant eco-cult. Erkki Pulliainen, an MP of the Green League, in collaboration with Maltais and the University of Helsinki, implemented the interdisciplinary ESSOC project (“Ecological Sylvilisation and Survival with the Aid of Original Cultures”) in 1991. The project was considered a failure.

In 1997, a publication in the journal Interculture by the Intercultural Institute of Montreal was devoted entirely to the theme of silvilization and ecosophy. The articles were written by authors such as Edward Goldsmith, Gary Snyder, and Gita Mehta.
