= Iriadamant =

Community in northern Finland

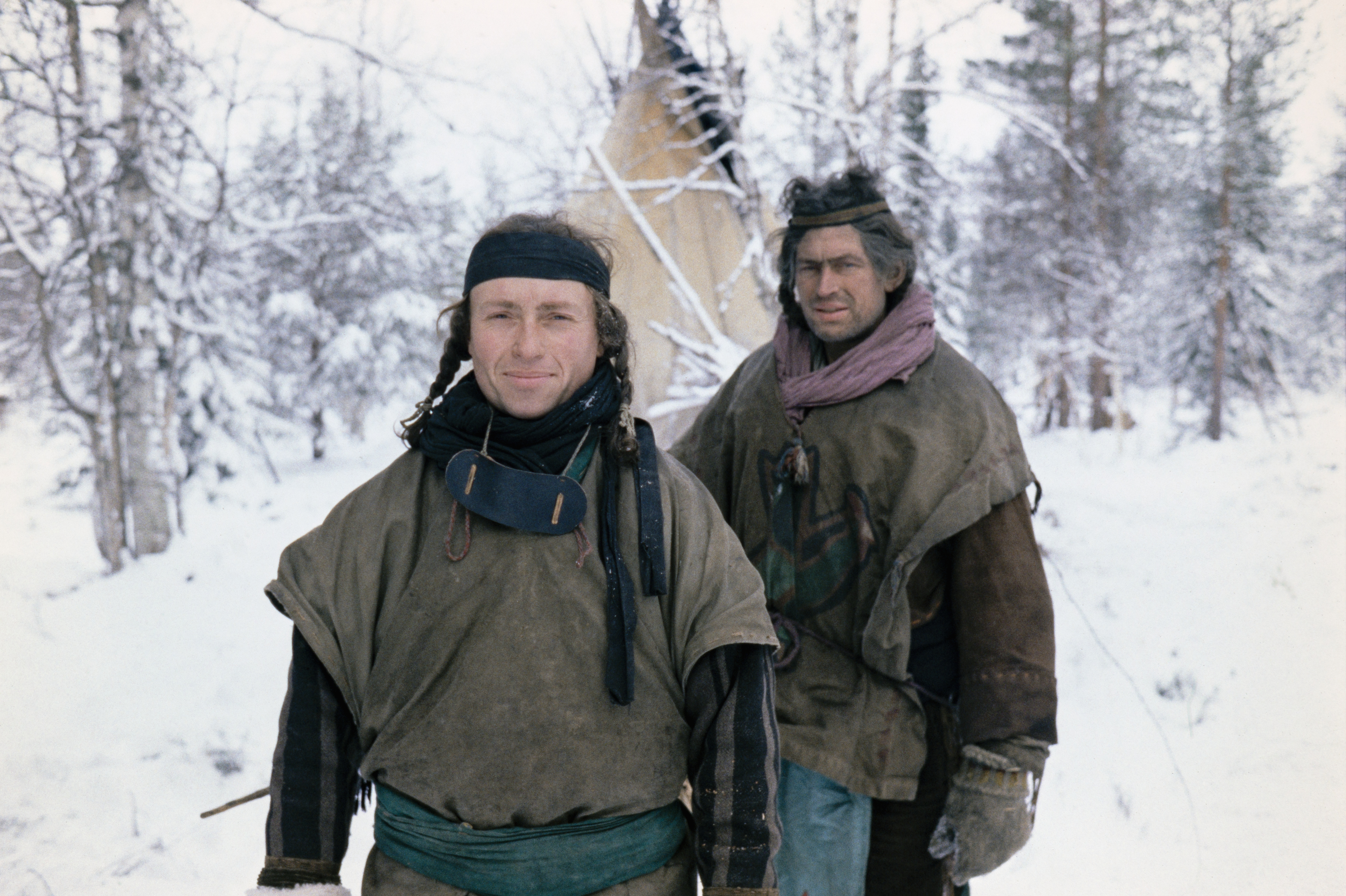
- Members of the Iriadamant community in Kittilä, October 1992.
- Formation: 1973 (as La Tribu)
- Founder: Pierre Doris Maltais (also known as Norman William, Alpjoine)
- Dissolved: 1993
- Type: Ecovillage / new religious movement, also described as a cult
- Location: Originally France; camp near Kittilä, Finland, 1991–1993

The Iriadamant were a community, also described as a cult, that lived in northern Finland from 1991–1993. The residents of the community were mainly French and Belgian but dressed in Native American costumes. The group arrived in Finland with the support of Professor Erkki Pulliainen of the University of Oulu with the intention of "studying living in nature" and learning self-sufficiency. In the fall of 1991, the group founded a camp near Kittilä. Although of European descent, they were referred to as "Kittilä's Indians" (Finnish: Kittilän intiaanit) or "lifestyle Indians" (Finnish: elämäntapaintiaani). When the camp was first established, it was generally viewed in a positive light.

By the beginning of 1993, the attitude had changed. Professor Pulliainen soon called off the relationship when it became clear that no research was being done at the camp. According to newspaper reports, the conditions were miserable, cold, dirty, and residents lacked food and healthcare. Campers were accused in the newspapers of, among other things, abusing children. It was revealed that the group was mainly dependent on external food supply. The founder of the Iriadamant, Pierre Maltais, usually did not live in the camp but in a hotel in Helsinki. The movement was more and more widely regarded as a "green feather show" created by an eco-cult, in which the leadership deceived the outside world and its members. The Iriadamant were deported from Finland in 1993. The community disbanded soon after.

== Background ==
Iriadamant members with spruce boughs

The Iriadamant camp was founded by the French-Canadian Pierre Doris Maltais. Maltais, who also used the names Norman William and Alpjoine, falsely claimed he was of Métis ancestry. He and his followers later presented themselves as Mi'kmaq people. In 1973, Maltais founded La Tribu, an ecological group. They later changed their name to Ecoovie (English: ecological life). The group moved to Paris in 1978 and began to sell natural products. In 1984, the group embarked on a worldwide tour to plant trees and spread their philosophy. The core group was primarily French, French Canadian, and Belgian. Members of the community identified with Native American peoples and customs, dressing in traditional costumes and taking Native-inspired names.

At its height, Ecoovie had around 500 members throughout Europe living a primitive lifestyle. They generally rejected modern diets, medical care, and tool usage. The group later took the name of Iriadamant, derived from the phrase "lifestyle painters".

== Establishment of the camp ==
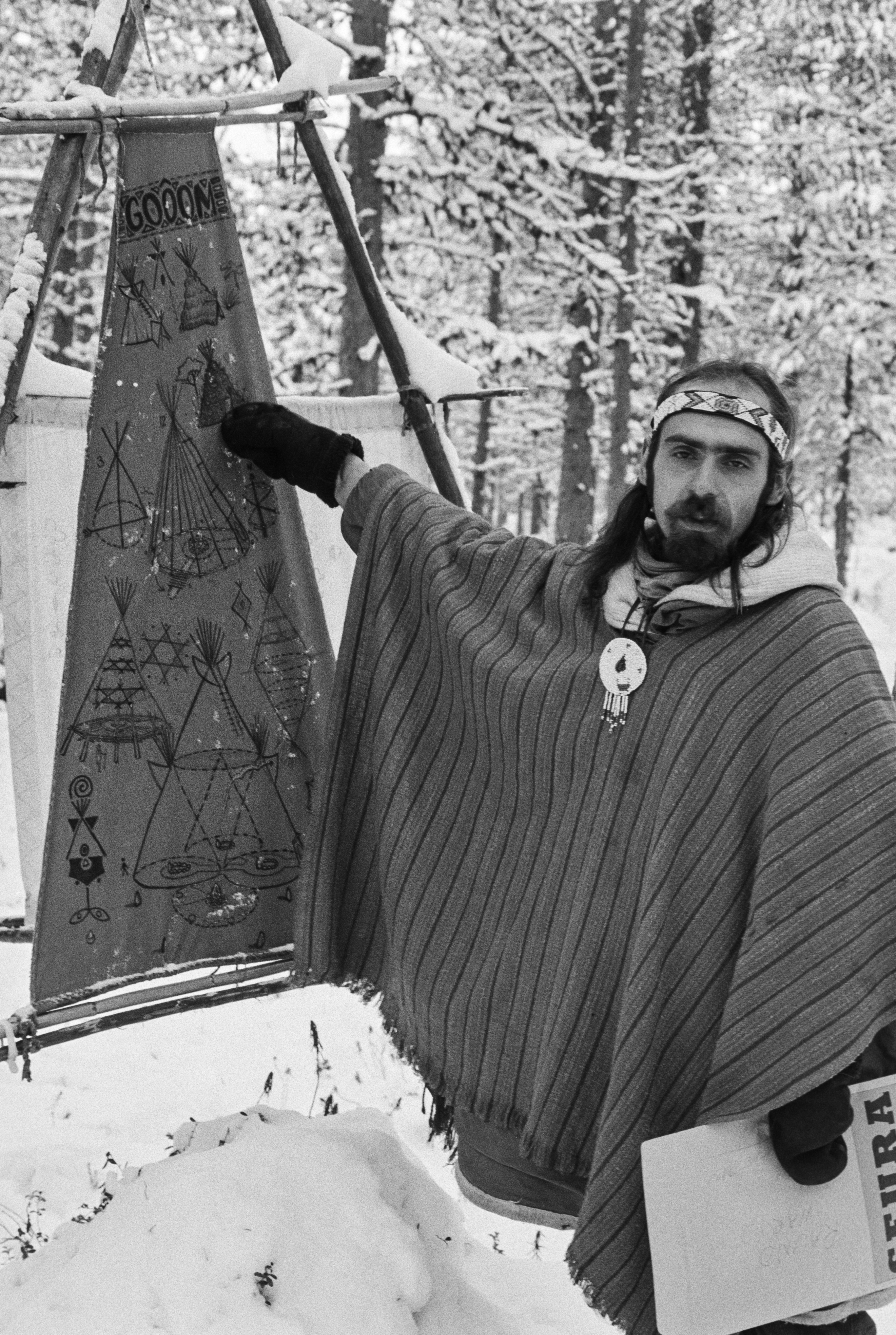
A member of the Iriadamant community presents structural drawings of gwam tents

Gwam construction at the Iriadamant camp in Kittilä

The group came to Finland via Sweden after walking from Italy in 1991. They were invited to Finland by architect Ilpo Okkonen and Erkki Pulliainen, a professor of zoology at the University of Oulu and MP of the Green League. According to the agreement with Pulliainen, the group came to Finland to implement the interdisciplinary ESSOC project (“Ecological Sylvilisation and Survival with the Aid of Original Cultures”) in cooperation with the University of Helsinki. On this basis, they were granted a residence permit until the end of July 1992. It was reported that the group initially included about 140 people.

The Iriadamant group stated that their goal was to scientifically study the adaptation of humans to nature through the lifestyle of native peoples. They opposed the western way of life, and in contrast, the group practiced silvilization and religious rituals. They also sought to study organic life within the arctic. Their proposed experiments were to run for seven years, by which time they hoped to be self-sufficient.

The community was thought by some to be a true tribe of Native Americans, and were met with curiosity and positivity from the public. Their first camp was near Oulu. Although the original goal was to end up in southern Finland, they made a deal with a tourism company in Kittilä. They agreed to act as a tourist attraction in exchange for land and provisions. The group was settled in Lainio, a small tourist village near Neitokainen. However, within a year, the camp was closed to outsiders.

In Lainio, the Iriadamant built permanent turf-covered shelters called "gwams". The settlement was divided into sub-camps for men, women, and children, which surrounded a central forum and marketplace.

== Lifestyle and troubles ==
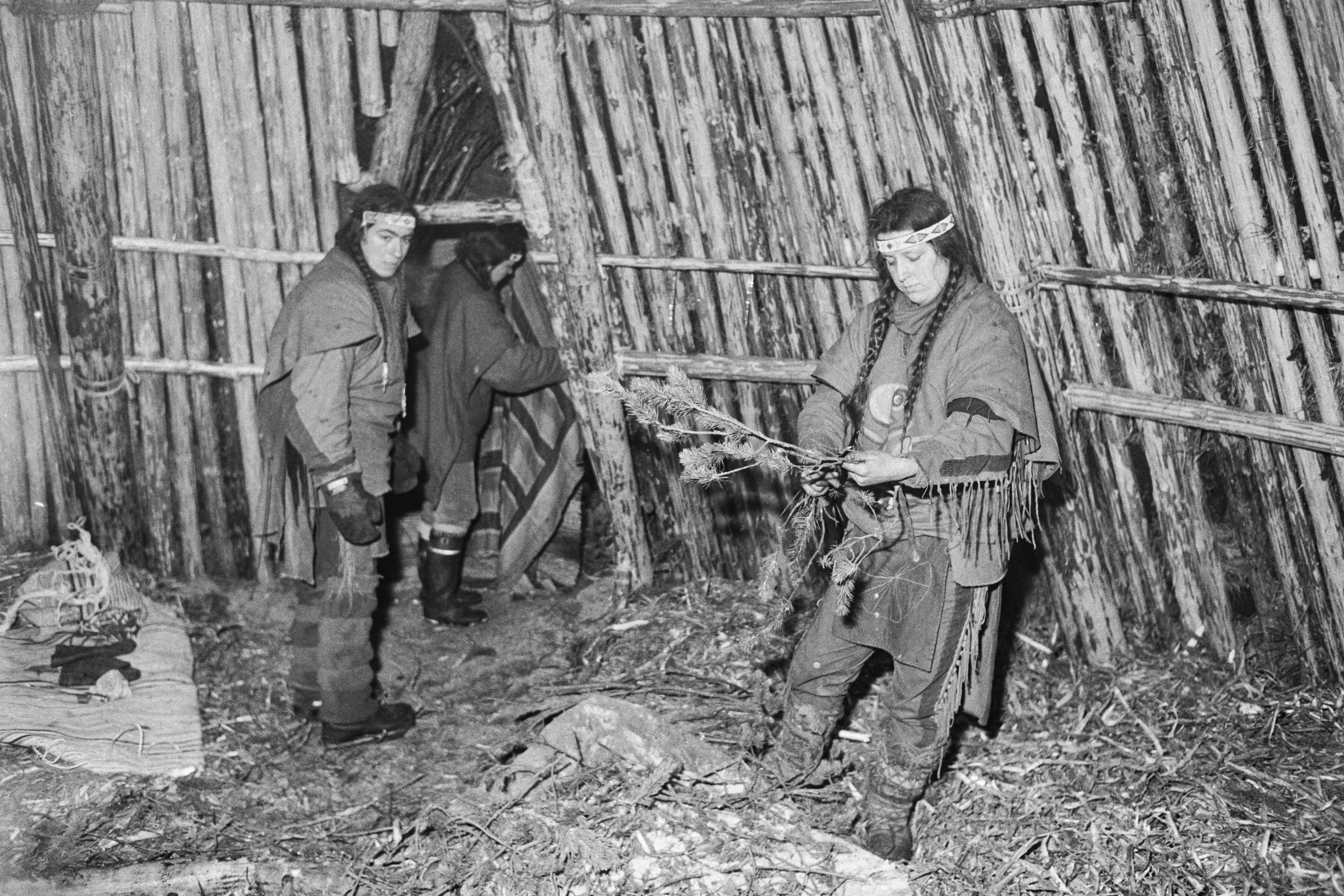
Iriadamant camp members inside a gwam

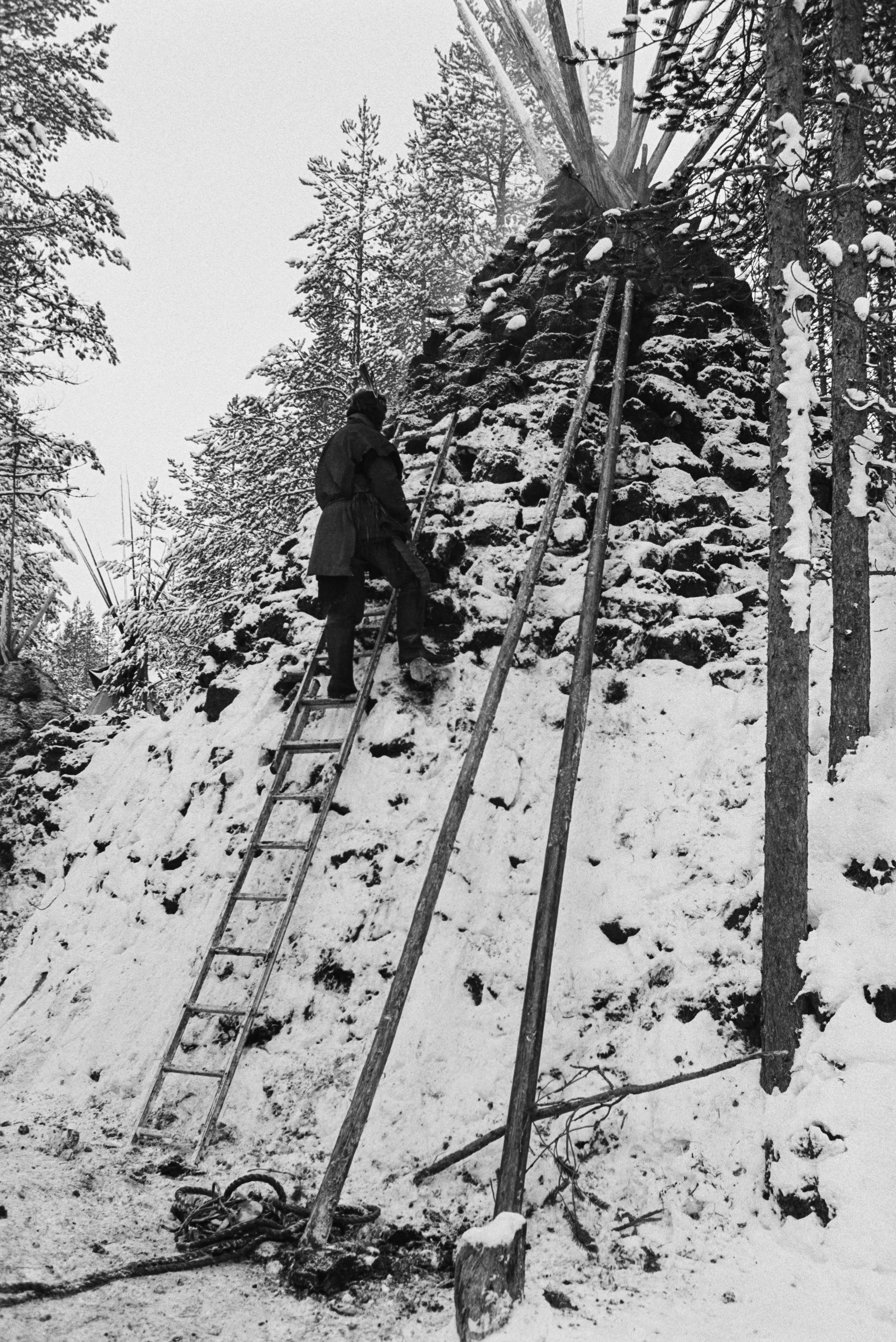
Gwam exterior

The Iriadamant practiced animistic religious beliefs. Daily rituals and routines were planned around planetary cycles and the seasons. Four "guardians of the elements" were elected quarterly to delegate duties to tribal members. The community lived on a vegan diet and sought to gather much of their food. The group led sustainable living workshops in nearby municipalities as part of their "University of Life" program.

In Finland, the Iriadamant were unsuccessful in their quest for self-sufficiency. The camp was reliant on food donations from local farmers and members of their support organization. Potatoes were illegally smuggled from Sollefteå as they were unable to grow their own. Four truckloads of firewood were delivered each day. Despite this outside support, camp conditions were inadequate. Hygiene and dental health were noted to be issues.

The group also pretended to live more organically than it actually did, secretly using modern supplies and tools. Dishware made to look like bark and cloth was actually plastic and glass. Donated clothes were discarded or used as building insulation. It was found that they used modern saws to fell trees. After the camp was abandoned, a large amount of plastic trash remained.

In August 1992, a three-year-old boy died in the camp from bronchitis and duodenitis. One of the group's members, Ilpo Okkonen, claimed that the boy may have been sexually abused by Maltais before his death. According to Okkonen, the child and Maltais privately retreated to Maltais' gwam following a ceremony on the boy's birthday. The child's scream was later heard from the gwam. After the incident, the boy became frantic and withdrawn.

== Media and press reports ==
The press covering the Iriadamant was sharply divided into two groups. Many weekly magazines presented the group and its ideology in a positive tone after it arrived in Finland. Conversely, a few newspapers and Vihreä Lanka, a Green League affiliated magazine, began to write negatively about the group.

The camp was said to be completely isolated, and the residents were said to have run into trouble with the local population and authorities. The group was accused, among other things, of abusing children and keeping people in the camp against their will. The leader of the group, Maltais, was connected to the international drug and arms trade and terrorism. The accusations were based on the book Ecoovie: le mic-mac des services secrets, published in 1990, and interviews with Elisabeth Rydell-Janson, the former international secretary of the Swedish Greens. The media described the conditions in the Kittilä camp as miserable and reported that the residents were suffering from hunger and cold.

According to Matti Sarmela, professor of anthropology at the University of Helsinki, it was a case of smearing and delegitimization. According to historian Maarit Niiniluoto, it was telling that the authors of the most negative articles never visited the Kittilä camp and had no interest in learning about the messages and lives of the group.

== Deportation and disbandment ==
Erkki Pulliainen withdrew from the project after he suspected a scam, and ceased funding their research. Pulliainen later described the leader of the group, Maltais, as charismatic, socially gifted, and an excellent manipulator. After Pulliainen pulled his support, the Finnish Immigration Office did not want to extend the residency permit of the group. The decision was appealed by Antti Seppälä, then the Commissioner for Foreigners.

At the end of March 1993, MP Tina Mäkelä of the Finnish Rural Party submitted a written question in the parliament about the residence of the Iriadamant Indians in Finland. Mäkelä inquired about prohibiting future 'lifestyle studies', and asked whether the government was going to compensate the interested parties for the costs caused by the group. She estimated financial damage to be above one million markka. Interior Minister Mauri Pekkarinen stated in his answer that there was nothing suggestive of a crime in the group's activities and that the inquiry did not give rise to further action in that regard. Pekkarinen said that the processing of expenses the group might cause to individuals or companies was not part of the tasks of public authorities.

In the summer of 1993, the group performed a "Walking Speech" across Finland. The Iriadamant spread their philosophy and gathered signatures for a petition showing support for the movement. Overall, 7,000 signatures were accrued and the petition was sent to president Mauno Koivisto.

The group was ultimately deported by the decision of the Ministry of the Interior, which was justified by the expiration of the temporary residence permit. The Iriadamant were subsequently prevented from accessing the camp in Lainio. In August 1993, over two truckloads of garbage were removed from the camp by volunteers. The Supreme Administrative Court rejected the group's appeal against the deportation decision at the end of September 1993.

The members of the group, of which there were 56 in the final stage, had announced that they would depart the country from Helsinki-Vantaa Airport on November 3, 1993. However, they did not appear. In actuality, a busload of passportless Iriadamant drove across the border to Sweden and down to the Netherlands. The group made it as far as Italy before they decided to disband.

In 1993, a Belgian court charged Maltais of, among other things, fraud and embezzlement. He escaped prosecution. He later moved to Nicaragua, where he allegedly died in 2015. Ecoovie appeared on the Rapport Gest-Guyard list of French cults in 1995.

== In popular culture ==
In 2017, Yle aired a radio program about the Ecoovie movement called Intiaanit tullee! featuring Ilpo Okkonen. The documentary series Gaialand was released in 2022 using footage taken by Okkonen.

In 2026,SVT aired a four-part documentary series about the group titled "Hövdingen" [English:The Chief].

== See also ==
- List of new religious movements
