= Reidar Särestöniemi =

Finnish painter (1925–1981)

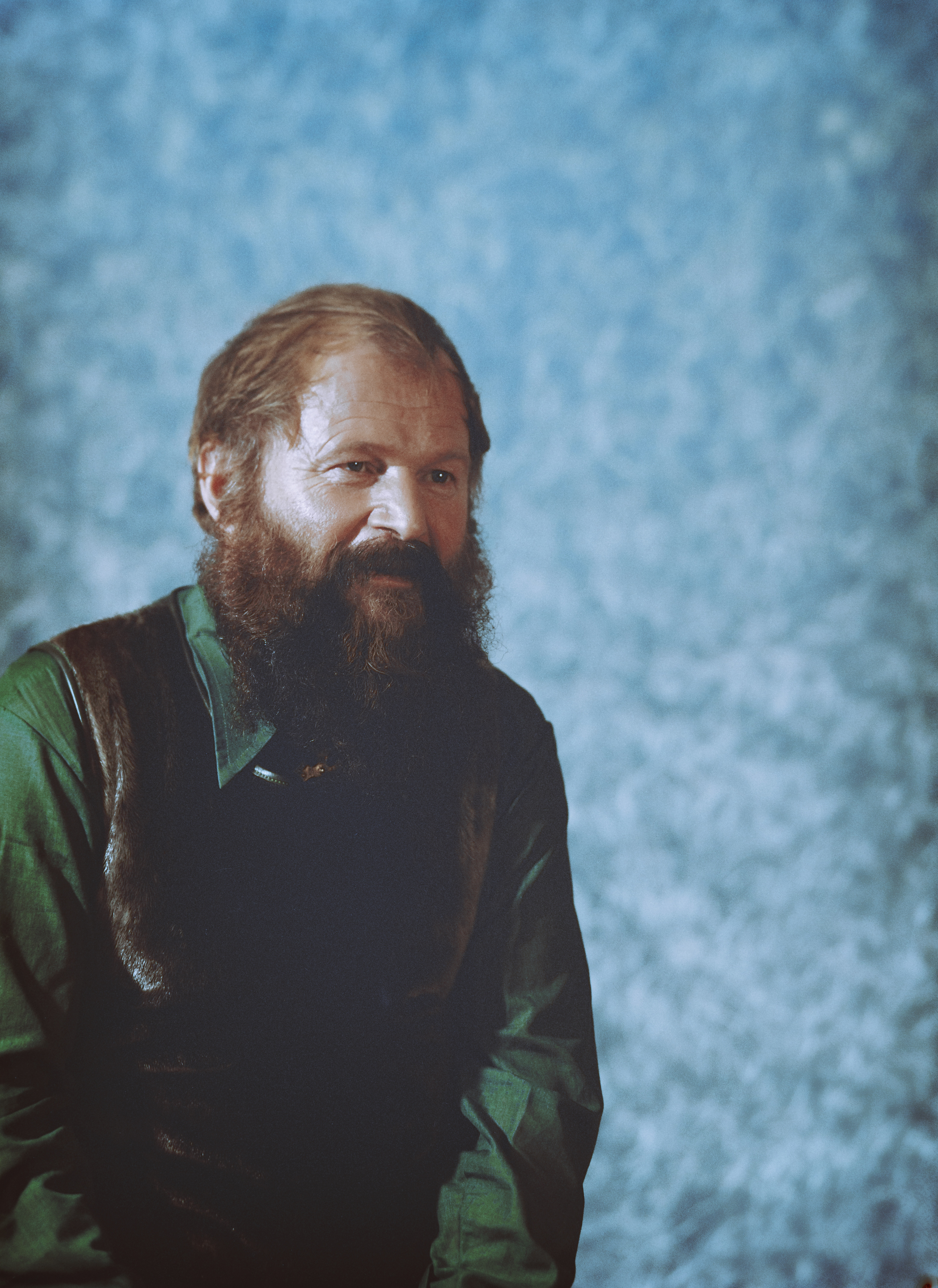
Reidar Särestöniemi in 1975.

Reidar Särestöniemi (14 May 1925, Kittilä – 27 May 1981, Kittilä) was a Finnish painter from Finnish Lapland. He is considered one of the greatest Finland-Lappish artists in the entire history of Finland.

Särestöniemi was born as the youngest child of Alma and Matti Kaukonen at the Särestöniemi farm near the Ounasjoki river in Kittilä. The family later renamed itself after the farm. Reidar Särestöniemi studied art in Helsinki from 1947 to 1951. After this he studied for three years in the famous Repin Institute.

Särestöniemi has had many exhibitions all over the world, with the furthest being in Japan in 1980. The President of Finland awarded Särestöniemi the title of Professor of Arts in 1975.

The Särestöniemi museum was founded after the artist's death in 1985. The museum exhibits the painter's work in their original surroundings. In 2015, in observation of Särestöniemi's 90th birthday and in honor of the museum's 30th anniversary, sculptor Sonja Vectomov unveiled a statue of Särestöniemi at the museum.

The museum complex includes the estate of the Särestöniemi family, which represents the old “peräpohjalainen” building tradition, Old Särestö (1873) and the impressive log buildings Galleria (1972) and Ateljee-koti (1978) built by Reidar Särestöniemi and designed by the architect couple Reima and Raili Pietilä.

== Private Life ==
Särestöniemi was in a relationship with poet Yrjö Kaijärvi, whom he met in the late 1960s. Their relationship lasted about four years and remained largely private. He was also involved with artist Kalervo Palsa.

== Sources ==
- Reidar Särestöniemi at www.kittila.fi
- The Särestöniemi Museum
