= Neitokainen =

Human-made pond in Kittilä, Finland

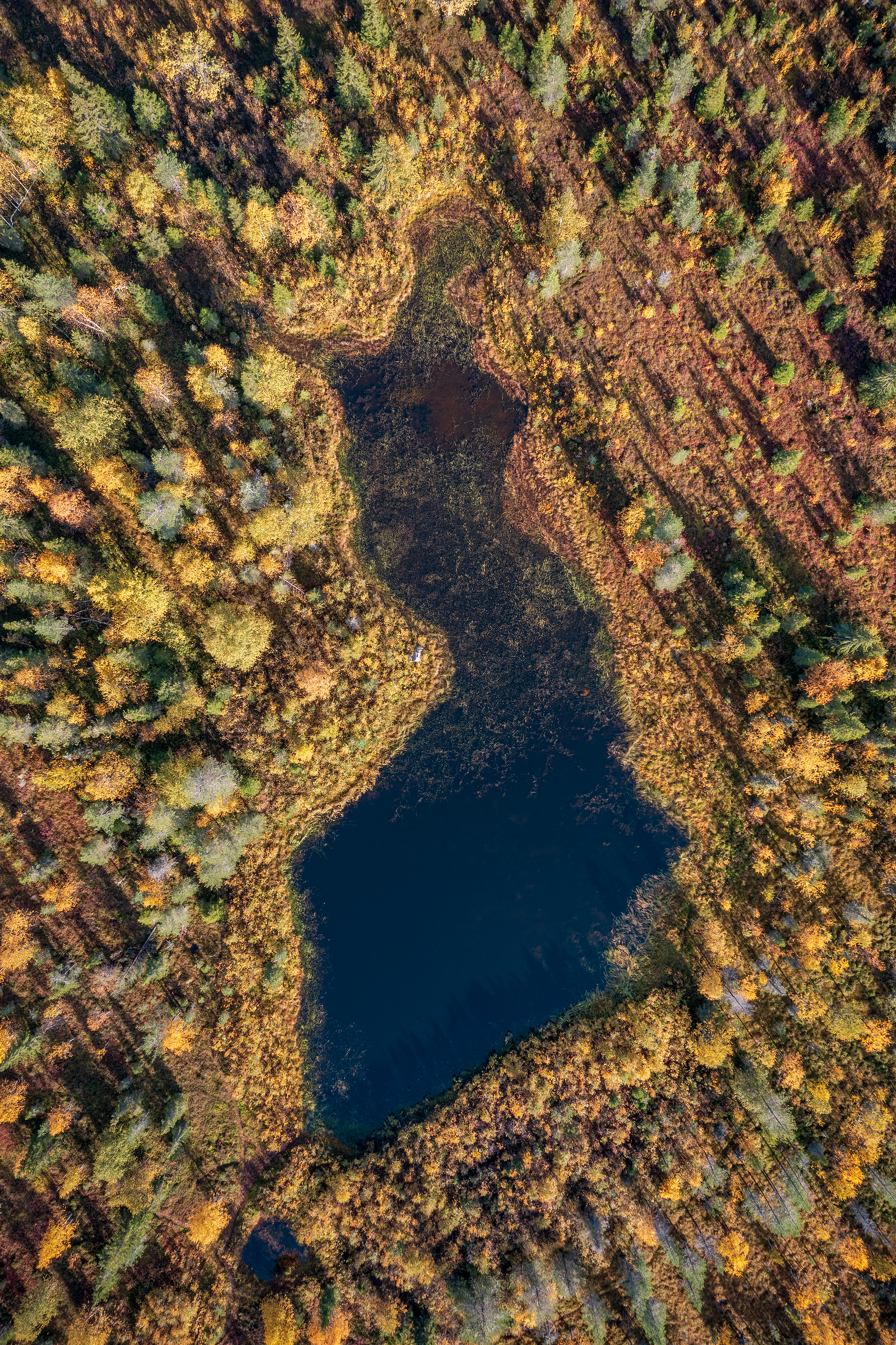
- Neitokainen in 2023

- Location within Finland
- Location: Kittilä, Finland
- Coordinates: 67°33′22″N 24°30′04″E
- Built: 1991
- Construction engineer: Esko Sääskilahti
- Max. length: 116 meters (381 ft)
- Surface area: 2,842 square metres (30,590 sq ft)
- Average depth: 1 meter (3 ft 3 in)

Neitokainen (also called Neitojärvi or Finlantto) is an artificial pond in Finland. It was constructed in the municipality of Kittilä on the slope of Vesikkovaara in 1991. It is known for being shaped in the cartographic form of Finland.

The length of the pond is 116 meters (381 ft) and the average depth is one meter. The pond is in the shape of Finland at a 1:10,000 scale.

== History ==
During the early 1990s there was a tourist boom in Lapland. The tourism company Polartrio wanted to create a holiday village in Kittilä. The area around what would become Neitokainen was zoned for the construction of luxury accommodations. The exhibition of performances by Iriadamant community members was planned to bring visitors to the area.

Polartrio employed Esko Sääskilahti as the construction manager for the project. Sääskilahti designed the pond as the central point of the village, and performed the necessary measurements and marked the contours of the lake on the terrain. The excavation work took about a week during the summer of 1991 using two machines. Neitokainen was then filled by groundwater. However, by the time the lake was constructed, the tourism industry faced a recession and the village was never completed.
