= Kittilä =

Kittilä Gihttel Kittâl Ǩiʹttel
- Municipality
- Kittilän kunta Kommunen Kittilä
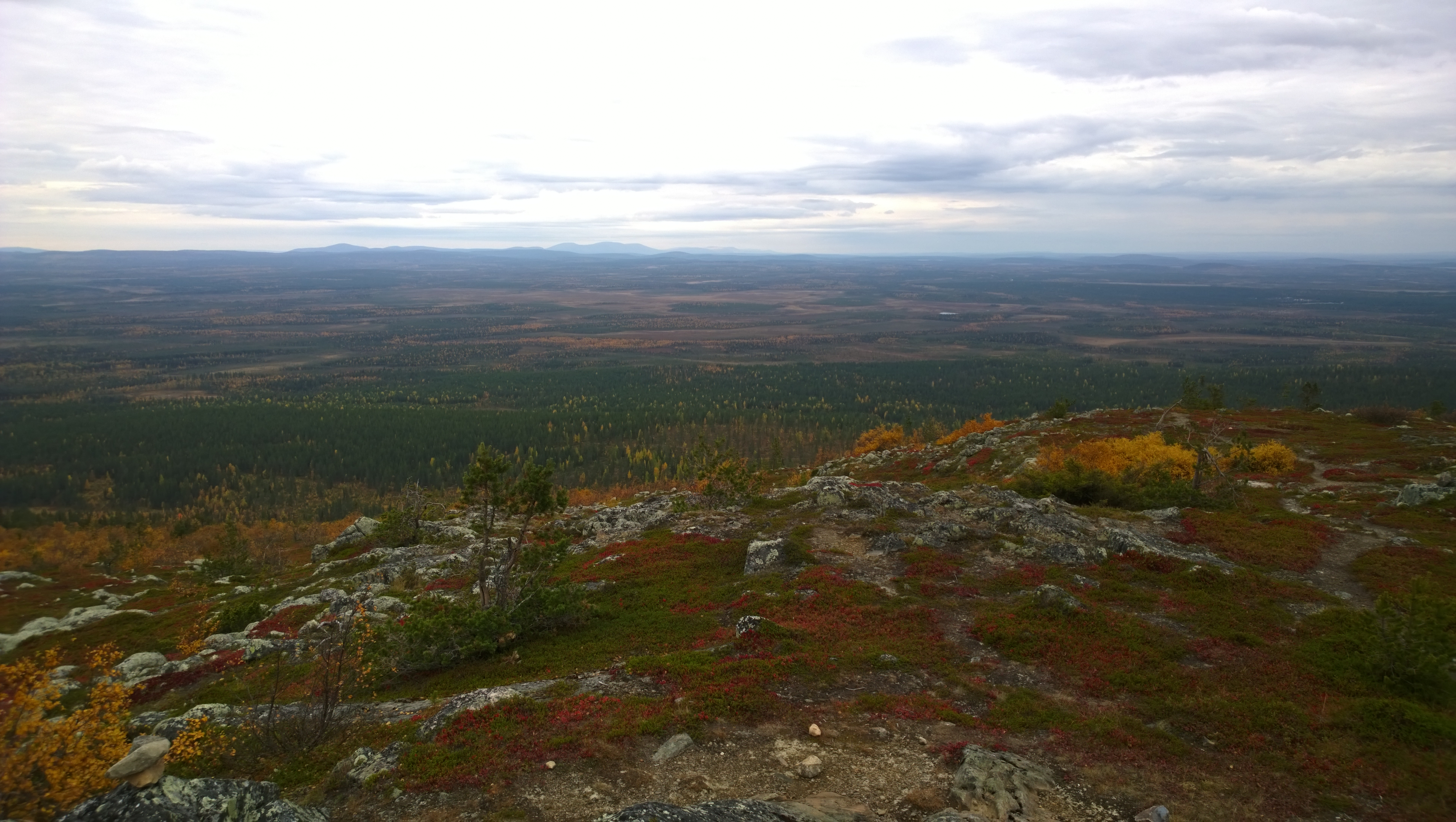
- View from the top of Kätkätunturi

- Coat of arms

- Location of Kittilä in Finland
- Interactive map of Kittilä
- Coordinates: 67°39′07″N 24°54′34″E
- Country: Finland
- Region: Lapland
- Sub-region: Fell Lapland
- Charter: 1854

Government
  - Municipality manager: Timo Kurula

Area (2018-01-01)
  - Total: 8,262.97 km^{2} (3,190.35 sq mi)
  - Land: 8,095.28 km^{2} (3,125.61 sq mi)
  - Water: 168.71 km^{2} (65.14 sq mi)
  - Rank: 3rd largest in Finland

Population (2025-12-31)
  - Total: 6,973
  - Rank: 135th largest in Finland
  - Density: 0.86/km^{2} (2.2/sq mi)
  - Village: 2,229

Population by native language
  - Finnish: 93.1% (official)
  - Swedish: 0.5%
  - Sami: 0.4%
  - Others: 6%

Population by age
  - 0 to 14: 15%
  - 15 to 64: 63.6%
  - 65 or older: 21.5%
- Time zone: UTC+02:00 (EET)
  - Summer (DST): UTC+03:00 (EEST)
- Website: kittila.fi/en

Kittilä (Finnish: [ˈkitːilæ]; Northern Sami: Gihttel, Inari Sami: Kittâl, Skolt Sami: Ǩiʹttel) is a municipality of Finland and a popular holiday resort. It is located in northern Finland north of the Arctic Circle within the Lapland region. The municipality has a population of 6,973 (31 December 2025) and covers an area of 8,262.97 square kilometres (3,190.35 sq mi) of which 168.71 km^{2} (65.14 sq mi) is water. The population density is 0.86 inhabitants per square kilometre (2.2/sq mi).

Kittilä is famous for being the location of the lowest recorded temperature in Finnish history: −51.5 °C (−60.7 °F), measured in January 1999 in Pokka. The "midnight sun" is above the horizon from 29 May to 16 July, and the period with continuous daylight lasts a bit longer, polar night from 14 December to 29 December.

The wolverine in the municipal coat of arms refers to the nature of Lapland. The coat of arms was designed by Einari Junttila, and was approved by the Kittilä municipal council at its meeting on 1 July 1963. The Ministry of the Interior confirmed the coat of arms for use on 26 November of the same year.

== Climate ==
Kittilä has a subarctic climate (Dfc) as a result of its northerly location and being far inland, which renders strong seasonal shifts. The sun does not set between 30 May and 15 July (47 days), and white nights lasts from early May to early August. The period that the sun does not rise lasts from 14 December to 29 December (16 days), the exact boundaries depending on local Topography. Although winter temperatures are cold they are still less severe than in similar locations elsewhere in the world due to some Gulf Stream influence. In summer temperatures generally are moderate, although warm days are possible. On 28 January 1999, Pokka, Kittilä recorded the official lowest temperature in Finland, -51.5 °C (-60.7 °F). On the same day, a temperature of -56.5 °C (-69.7 °F) was recorded in Naruska, Salla. However, this temperature is not considered an official record due to being recorded at a decommissioned weather station.

Climate data for Kittilä Pokka (1991-2020 normals, extremes 1971 - present)
Month	Jan	Feb	Mar	Apr	May	Jun	Jul	Aug	Sep	Oct	Nov	Dec	Year
Record high °C (°F)	5.1 (41.2)	6.5 (43.7)	9.5 (49.1)	15.0 (59.0)	28.5 (83.3)	30.2 (86.4)	31.8 (89.2)	30.9 (87.6)	22.0 (71.6)	12.6 (54.7)	8.5 (47.3)	6.0 (42.8)	31.8 (89.2)
Mean maximum °C (°F)	0.3 (32.5)	0.9 (33.6)	4.5 (40.1)	10.0 (50.0)	19.6 (67.3)	24.6 (76.3)	26.0 (78.8)	23.7 (74.7)	17.3 (63.1)	8.9 (48.0)	2.4 (36.3)	1.5 (34.7)	27.2 (81.0)
Mean daily maximum °C (°F)	−8.8 (16.2)	−8.3 (17.1)	−2.9 (26.8)	2.8 (37.0)	9.0 (48.2)	15.6 (60.1)	19.0 (66.2)	16.1 (61.0)	10.1 (50.2)	1.8 (35.2)	−3.8 (25.2)	−6.7 (19.9)	3.7 (38.6)
Daily mean °C (°F)	−12.9 (8.8)	−12.4 (9.7)	−7.8 (18.0)	−1.7 (28.9)	4.3 (39.7)	10.4 (50.7)	13.5 (56.3)	11.1 (52.0)	5.8 (42.4)	−1.2 (29.8)	−7.0 (19.4)	−10.4 (13.3)	−0.7 (30.8)
Mean daily minimum °C (°F)	−18.0 (−0.4)	−17.7 (0.1)	−13.7 (7.3)	−7.2 (19.0)	−0.5 (31.1)	5.5 (41.9)	8.4 (47.1)	6.1 (43.0)	1.9 (35.4)	−4.3 (24.3)	−10.8 (12.6)	−15.3 (4.5)	−5.5 (22.2)
Mean minimum °C (°F)	−35.6 (−32.1)	−34.3 (−29.7)	−30.2 (−22.4)	−22.1 (−7.8)	−8.7 (16.3)	−1.2 (29.8)	1.5 (34.7)	−2.4 (27.7)	−6.4 (20.5)	−17.7 (0.1)	−25.5 (−13.9)	−31.3 (−24.3)	−38.1 (−36.6)
Record low °C (°F)	−51.5 (−60.7)	−43.0 (−45.4)	−42.8 (−45.0)	−33.2 (−27.8)	−21.4 (−6.5)	−4.5 (23.9)	−2.3 (27.9)	−10.1 (13.8)	−13.9 (7.0)	−28.6 (−19.5)	−38.0 (−36.4)	−42.0 (−43.6)	−51.5 (−60.7)
Average precipitation mm (inches)	30 (1.2)	25 (1.0)	25 (1.0)	25 (1.0)	31 (1.2)	48 (1.9)	62 (2.4)	63 (2.5)	52 (2.0)	46 (1.8)	39 (1.5)	31 (1.2)	477 (18.7)
Average snowfall cm (inches)	19 (7.5)	19 (7.5)	19 (7.5)	12 (4.7)	7 (2.8)	—	—	—	1 (0.4)	8 (3.1)	20 (7.9)	26 (10)	131 (52)
Average precipitation days	7	8	7	6	8	9	10	9	8	8	9	9	98
Average relative humidity (%) (daily average)	86	85	81	76	68	66	71	76	83	90	90	86	80
Source 1: www.ilmatieteenlaitos.fi kilotavu.com
Source 2: weather-atlas.com

== Economy ==
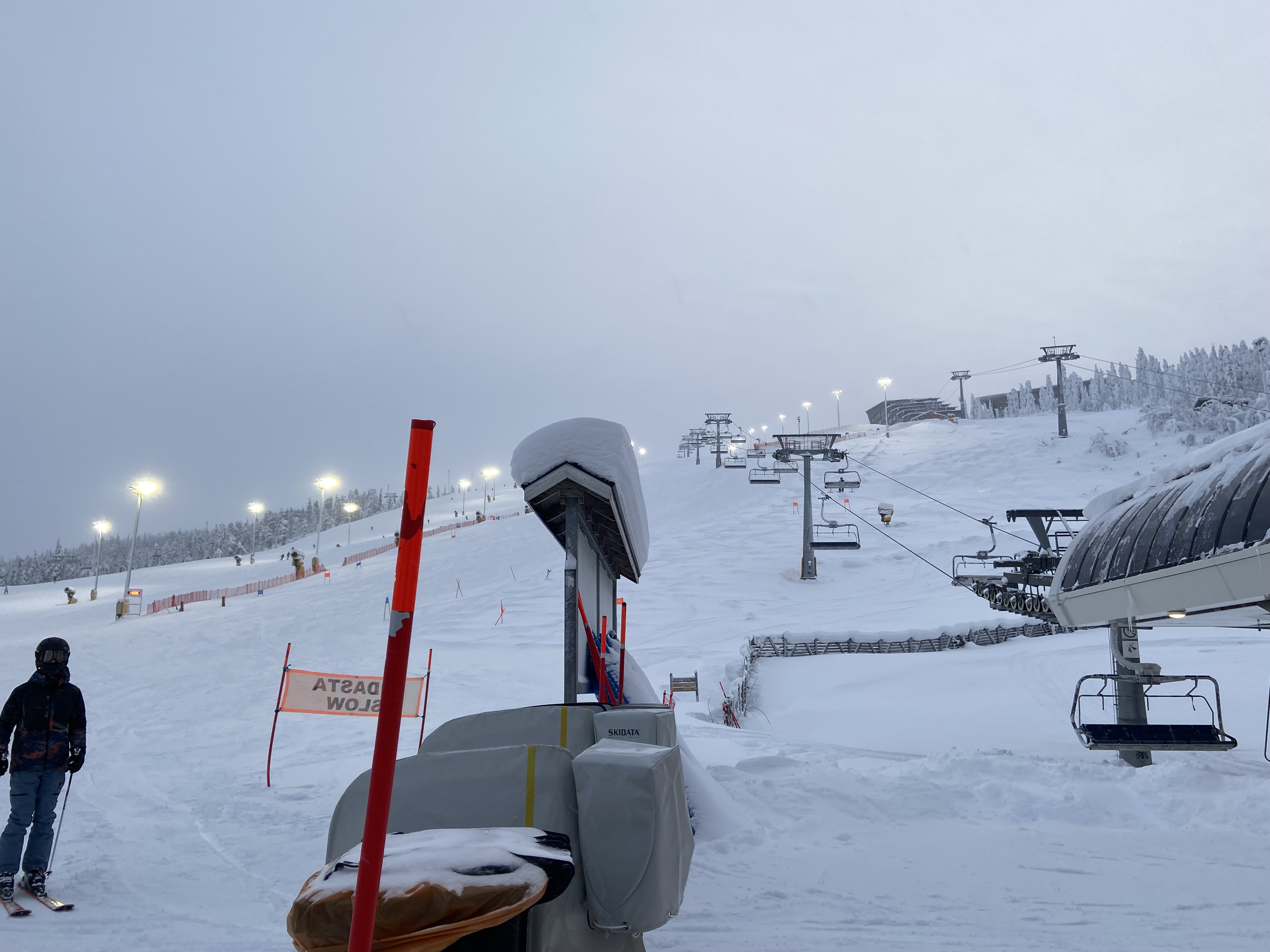
Ski Resort Levi

In the 1980s and 1990s, Kittilä had a tourism boom. The village of Lainio became a hotbed for tourism innovation and included the planned construction of glass-roofed cabins for viewing of the aurora and luxury accommodations built around Neitokainen, a Finland-shaped lake. The Iriadamant eco-cult made a deal with a tourism company to act as an attraction in exchange for land and provisions.

The ski resort Levi is situated in the village of Sirkka, Kittilä on Levi Fell (in Finnish "Levitunturi") (elevation 531 metres (1742 feet)). The resort hosts a slalom event early each season on the Alpine World Cup circuit and offers both downhill and cross-country skiing to the public, as well as snow shoeing, including to the next nearest fell, Kätkätunturi, located west of Levitunturi. Kätkätunturi is 504.6 metres (1,656 ft) high and 7 kilometres (4 mi) long.

On 5 June 2006, it was announced that a Canadian mining corporation Agnico-Eagle Mines will start a new gold mine in Kittilä. Once completed, it will be the biggest gold mine in Europe. Experts say that the deposits hold at least three million ounces of gold, by current market price worth 1.8 billion U.S. dollars. The mine is expected to produce an average of 150,000 ounces of gold annually for at least 13 years.

== Transportation ==
Kittilä Airport is served by Finnair and Norwegian Air. TUI Airways also serves the airport from various UK bases as part of their programme of ski flights, as well as Christmas specials and flights in support of the When You Wish Upon A Star children's foundation. The Lufthansa group also has flights between Germany and Kittilä. airBaltic has irregular flights from Latvia.

== Notable residents ==
- Kalervo Palsa, artist
- Arto Paasilinna, novelist, born in Kittilä
- Reidar Särestöniemi, artist

== See also ==
- Levi, Finland
- Aakenustunturi
- Finnish national road 80
