= Kalervo Palsa =

Finnish artist (1947–1987)

- Born: 12 March 1947; Kittilä, Finland
- Died: 3 October 1987 (aged 40); Kittilä, Finland
- Occupation: Artist

Huugo Kalervo Palsa, known as Kalle (12 March 1947 – 3 October 1987), was a Finnish artist whose style has been described as fantastic expressionism, often influenced by depictions of sexuality.

Although his work did not draw significant attention in his lifetime, Kalervo Palsa's reputation grew after being the subject of exhibitions and writings following his death. In 2013, a film based on his life, Kalervo Palsa ja kuriton käsi was released. In 2013, his house was converted into the Palsa Museum, dedicated to his work.

== Life ==
Palsa was a native of Kittilä in Lapland. As a child, he grew up in a dysfunctional household where display of emotion was discouraged.

Palsa began keeping a journal in which he recorded his thoughts in the early 1960s. His work was first exhibited in Rovaniemi in 1967, and he became the first member of his family to graduate high school in 1970. He spent time in the 1970s as an art student in Helsinki, but resided permanently at a small studio cabin in Kittilä. It was connected to electricity by a long extension cable from a nearby house, and Palsa called it his "Getsemane" after the biblical site, or sometimes his "castle in the clouds".

Palsa was involved with artist Reidar Särestöniemi. His own diary contains references to a sexual relationship with Särestöniemi.

Palsa died in 1987, lying in bed at home alone with pneumonia.

== Legacy ==
During his life he had artist friends including Reidar Särestöniemi, but his two biggest supporters were his mother, and his soulmate/muse Maj-Lis Pitkänen, the sister of his childhood sweetheart Maaret.

After his death, Maj-Lis was bequeathed his artistic works and journal, and donated them to the Kiasma art museum in 1999. She would later go on to curate several exhibitions of his work and to edit compilations of his writings. She led a long-term campaign to install a memorial cenotaph for Palsa, which was sculpted by the Finnish artist, Pekka Pitkänen, Maj-Lis's husband. The statue, shaped like a stylized seed or bullroarer, was viewed by the parish as pagan, or even representing female sexual organs. Some argued against Palsa's burial in the parish due to his supposed sexual perversion, though his reputation has been partially rehabilitated since.

== Art ==
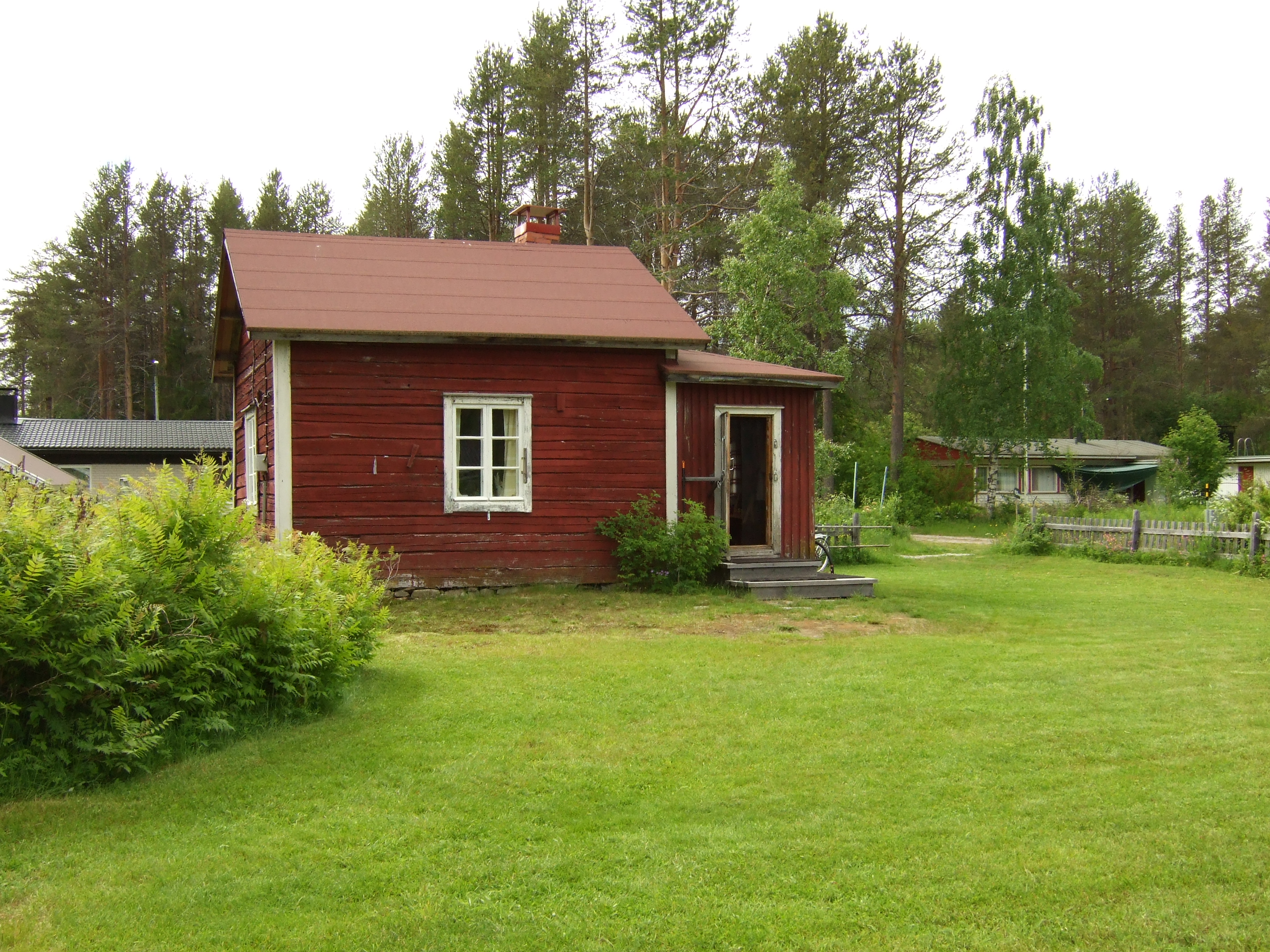
Kalervo Palsa Museum

Kalervo Palsa used a varied palette of techniques and materials, including housepaint. He painted over 1,000 self-portraits.

Most of his works explore in graphic detail the dark side of humanity, and especially of his native northern regions, with prominent themes including grotesque sexuality, sadism, homosexuality, bisexuality and a general emotional frigidity paraphilia.

Palsa went through a brief phase of experimentation with abstract art while staying in New York City. According to his diaries, this phase ended suddenly one day when he saw an unconscious black man sprawled on a subway bench.

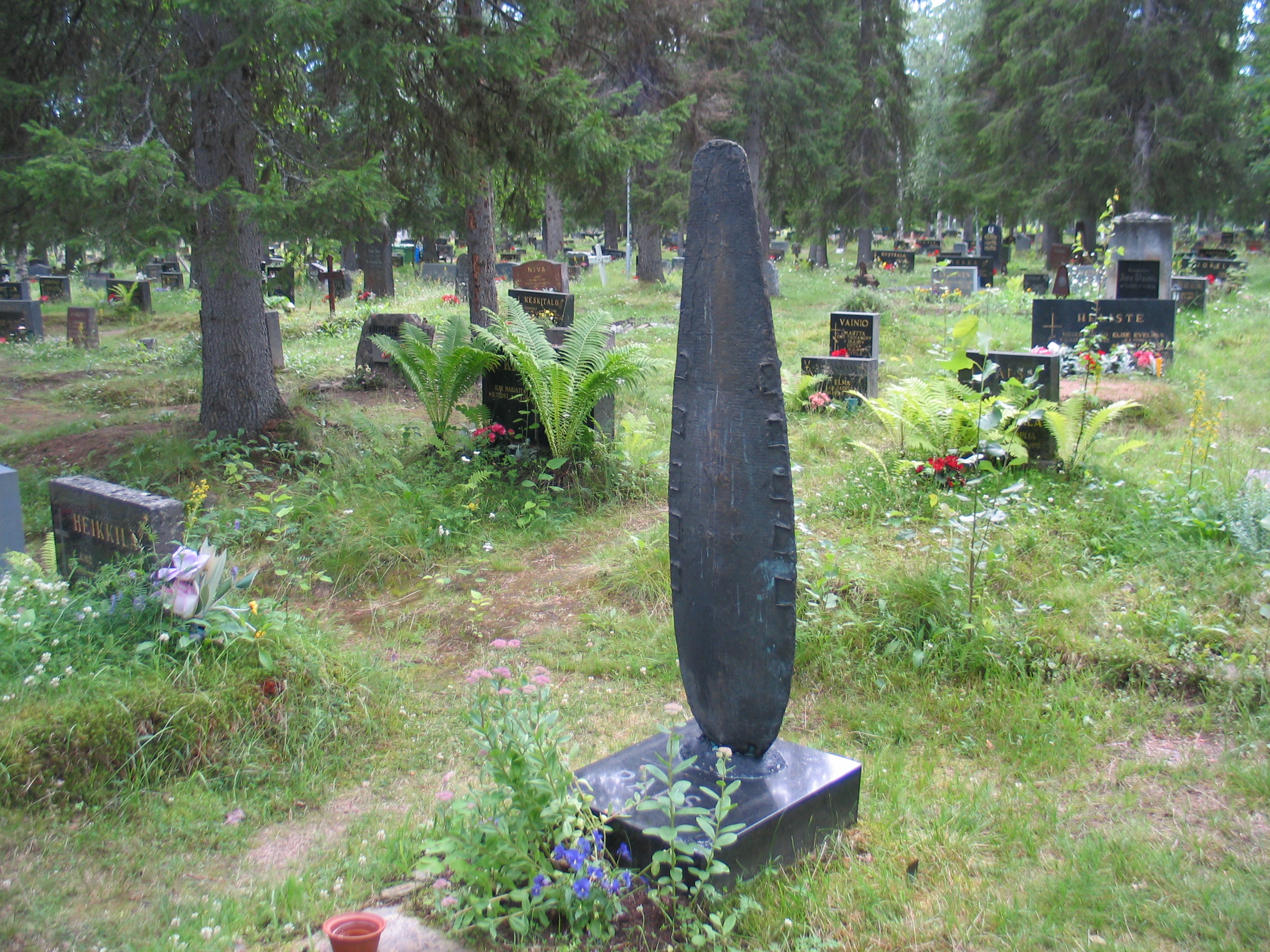
Kalervo Palsa gravestone

Besides Hieronymus Bosch, his work has been compared to that of Frida Kahlo. His artistic influences include René Magritte and Vincent van Gogh, and his works also include references to Jean-Paul Sartre, August Strindberg and Jean Genet. On the first page of Eläkeläinen muistelee, he mentions other looser influences such as Jonathan Swift and Vladimir Lenin, among others.

Some researchers have noted that though he remained active in his work up to his death in 1987, his work did not show signs of the postmodernism evident in the work of many other artists of the time.

=== Notable works ===
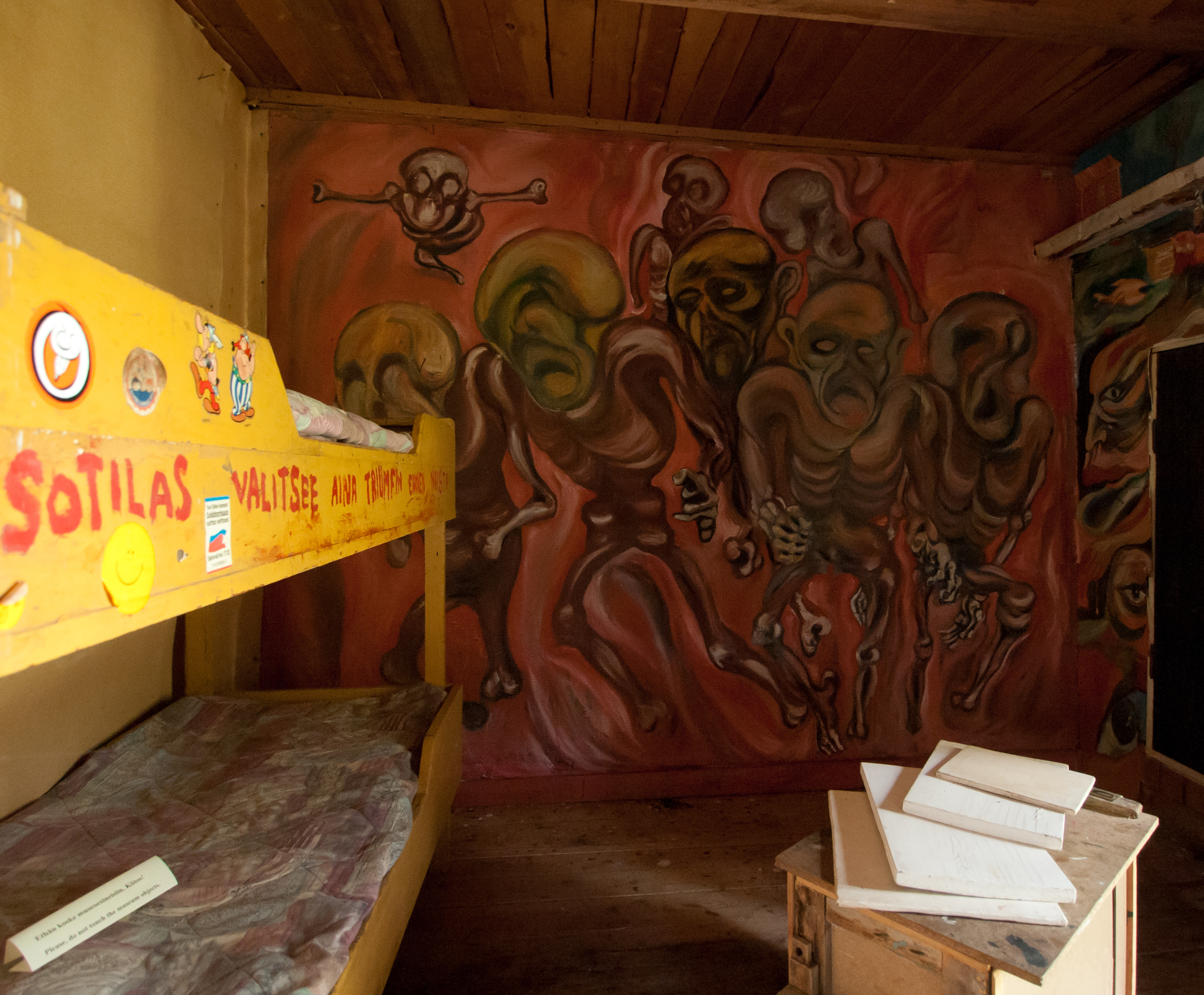
Artist's studio

- Turva ("Security") is a painting of a giant anus surrounded by horrifying images. At the center of the painting the anus opens as a window showing a man seated serenely in a rocking chair, apparently untouched by the horrors.
- Missi Paskantaa ("A Beauty Pageant Contestant Takes a Dump"), a black-and-white inked comic strip. The work consists of a few pages of deadpan illustrated technical description of the practical ramifications of beauty pageant contestants having to defecate, and finally ends with an illustrated listing of varieties of consistency of faeces that might come out of such a girl's anus, with attendant analysis.
- Eläkeläinen Muistelee ("Retiree Reminisces"), a black-and-white inked comic-book recounting a plethora of highly surreal homosexual sadistic tales.
- Miehen Kuukautiset ("The Male Period"), a painting of a man's bleeding anus.
- Vapautuminen ("Deliverance"), a painting of a man suspended in mid-air, hung by a rope attached around the glans of his own huge penis.
- Uusi Ihminen ("New (Hu)Man"), a man giving birth through his anal opening.
