= Levi, Finland =

Ski resort in Kittilä, Finland

Levi
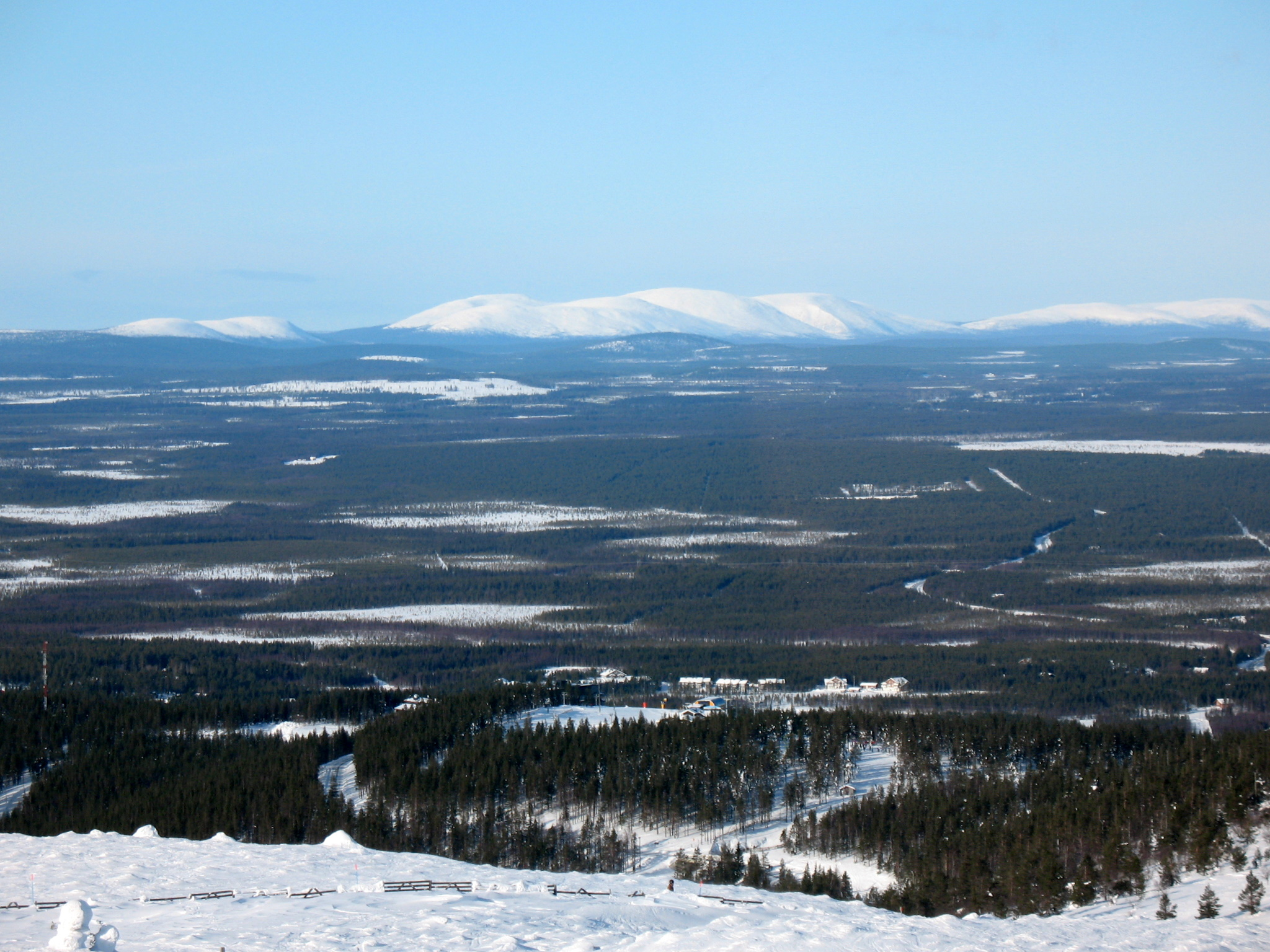
- View from atop Levi fell

- Location within Europe Location within Finland
- Location: Kittilä, Finland
- Nearest city: Kittilä: 17 km (11 mi)
- Coordinates: 67.805°N 24.802°E
- Vertical: 325 m (1,066 ft)
- Top elevation: 531 m (1,742 ft)
- Base elevation: 206 m (676 ft)
- Trails: 43 pistes, (1 transfer) – 17 beginner – (blue) – 22 intermediate – (red) – 3 advanced – (black)
- Longest run: 2.1 km (1.3 mi)
- Lift system: 27 total 2 gondolas 5 chairlifts 14 T-bar lifts 5 stick lifts for children 4 rope tows 1 magic carpet
- Terrain parks: 3
- Snowfall: low
- Snowmaking: yes
- Night skiing: 17 of 43 pistes
- Website: levi.fi/en

Levi is a fell located in Finnish Lapland, and the largest ski resort in Finland. The resort is located in the village of Sirkka, Kittilä municipality and is served by Kittilä Airport and Kolari railway station. At a latitude of 67.8° north, it is located approximately 170 km (110 mi) north of the Arctic Circle.

The peak of the Levi fell is at an elevation of 531 metres (1,742 ft) above sea level. There are 43 ski slopes (17 of which are floodlit) and 27 ski lifts in Levi. Ascending the fell are 2 gondolas, 5 chairlifts, 14 T-bar lifts, 5 stick lifts, 4 rope tows, and 1 magic carpet ski lift for children. Levi is one of two locations of gondola lifts in Finland, and has been chosen as the best domestic skiing resort in Finland four times.

Levi is an early stop on the FIS Alpine Ski World Cup circuit, hosting slaloms in mid-November, though the races in 2019 were held slightly later (November 23–24). With snowmaking, the climate provides a reliable early-season technical venue in Europe, prior to the late autumn events in North America. Uniquely, the winner of the women's slalom event is awarded a reindeer, though to date none of the winners have taken it away; the prize reindeer continue living on a nearby farm.

The slopes in Levi are mostly suitable for beginners or intermediates, but there are also three black slopes for experts. The highest vertical drop is 325 m (1,066 ft) and the longest slope is 2.1 km (1.3 mi) in length. The longest ski lift is about 1,636 metres (1.017 mi) long. Levi has one superpipe, one halfpipe, two streets, two snow parks, 10 free children's slopes and seven slope restaurants.

The skiing and snowboarding season in Levi is fairly long, often lasting from October to mid-May. The ski school provides instruction in downhill skiing, snowboarding, telemark skiing and cross-country skiing. Cross-country skiers have illuminated ski tracks and snow that lingers well into the spring. There are 230 km (140 mi) of cross-country skiing tracks and 886 km (550 mi) of snowmobiling tracks in Levi.

The resort's latitude, north of the Arctic Circle, usually guarantees generous snow cover and sub-freezing temperatures (< 0 °C (32 °F)) throughout winter. It also allows for excellent chances of observing the Northern Lights. Although very popular in winter, Levi is very quiet in the summertime, yet still a good base location for exploring the surrounding areas.

At 8 km (5 mi) from the centre of Levi is Luvattumaa, Levi Ice Hotel & Ice Gallery; 45 km (28 mi) from Levi is the Snow Village Lainio, where one can view snow and ice buildings, eat in an ice restaurant (in Lainio), or experience a night's sleep in an ice room.

== Family Areas ==
Leevilandia is a designated snow play area for families, beginner skiers and snowboarders. Located on the South Slopes adjacent to the South Point building, the area features two carpet lifts and a button lift that serves three beginner slopes. Recreational activities include sledding and snow tubing, and a traditional kota provides a sheltered fireplace for toasting marshmallows and grilling sausages.

Away from the slopes, Leevi's Playground provides an indoor space for young children to play and for visitors to heat and eat their own food. A ski bus connects Levi centre with South Point and serves Leevilandia. A valid ski pass or a separate Leevilandia day ticket grants access to the area.

Kids' Land, a former children's recreational area near Zero Point at the Front Slopes, last operated during the 2024–25 winter season and did not reopen the following winter. Leevilandia is now the resort's main family area.

== Gallery ==
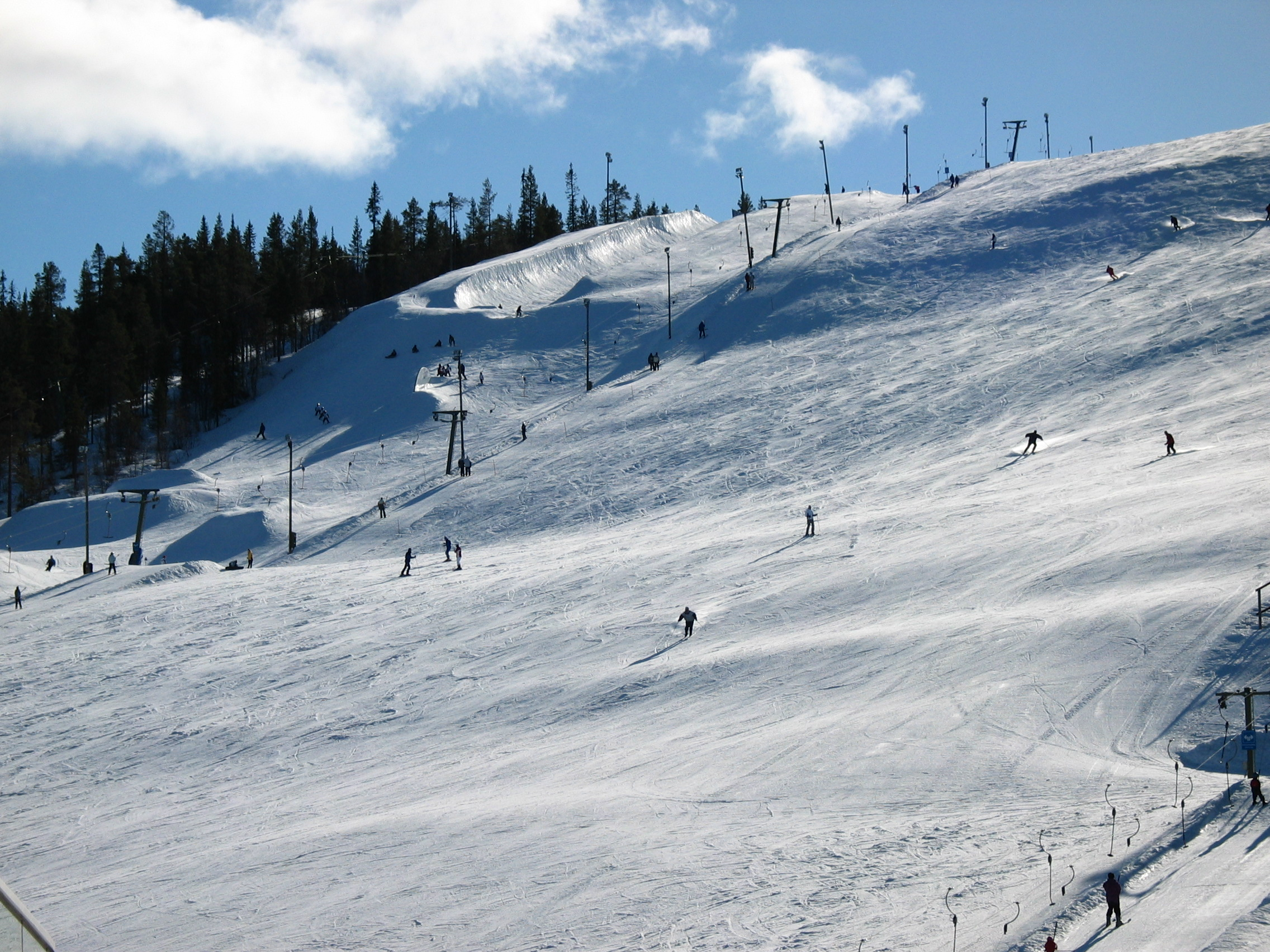
Levi slope in 2003

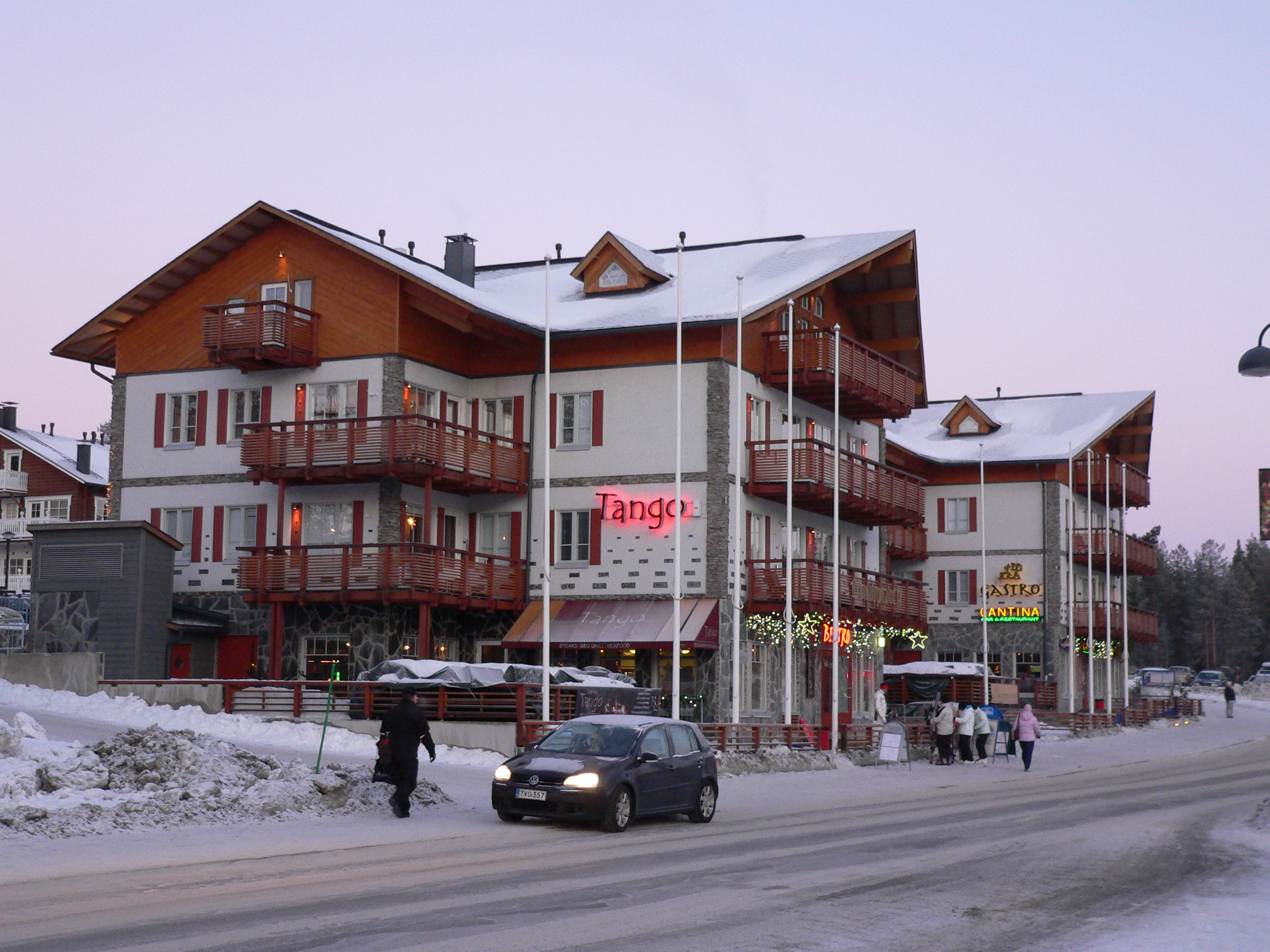
Cottages in Levi Center

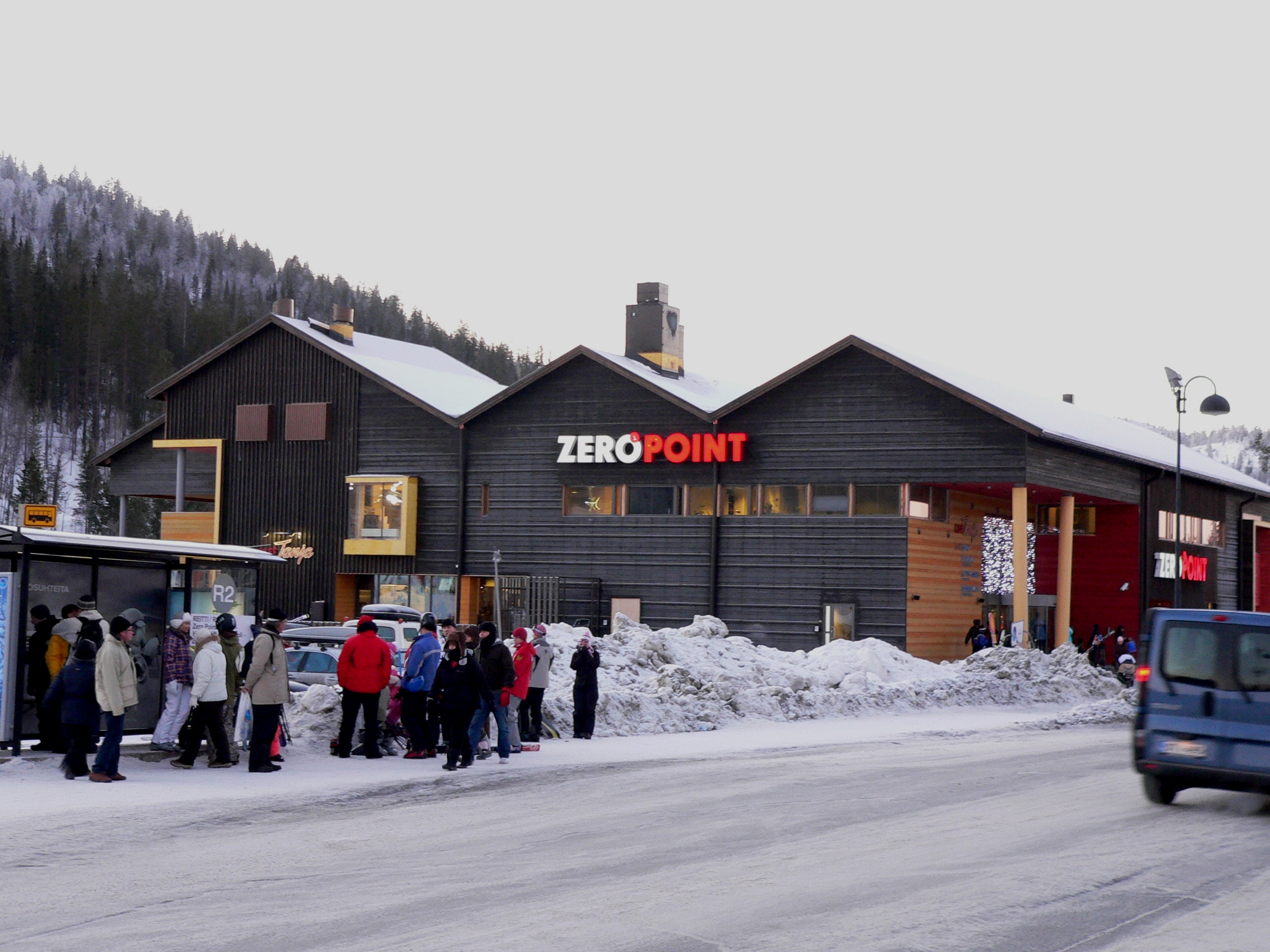
Zero Point

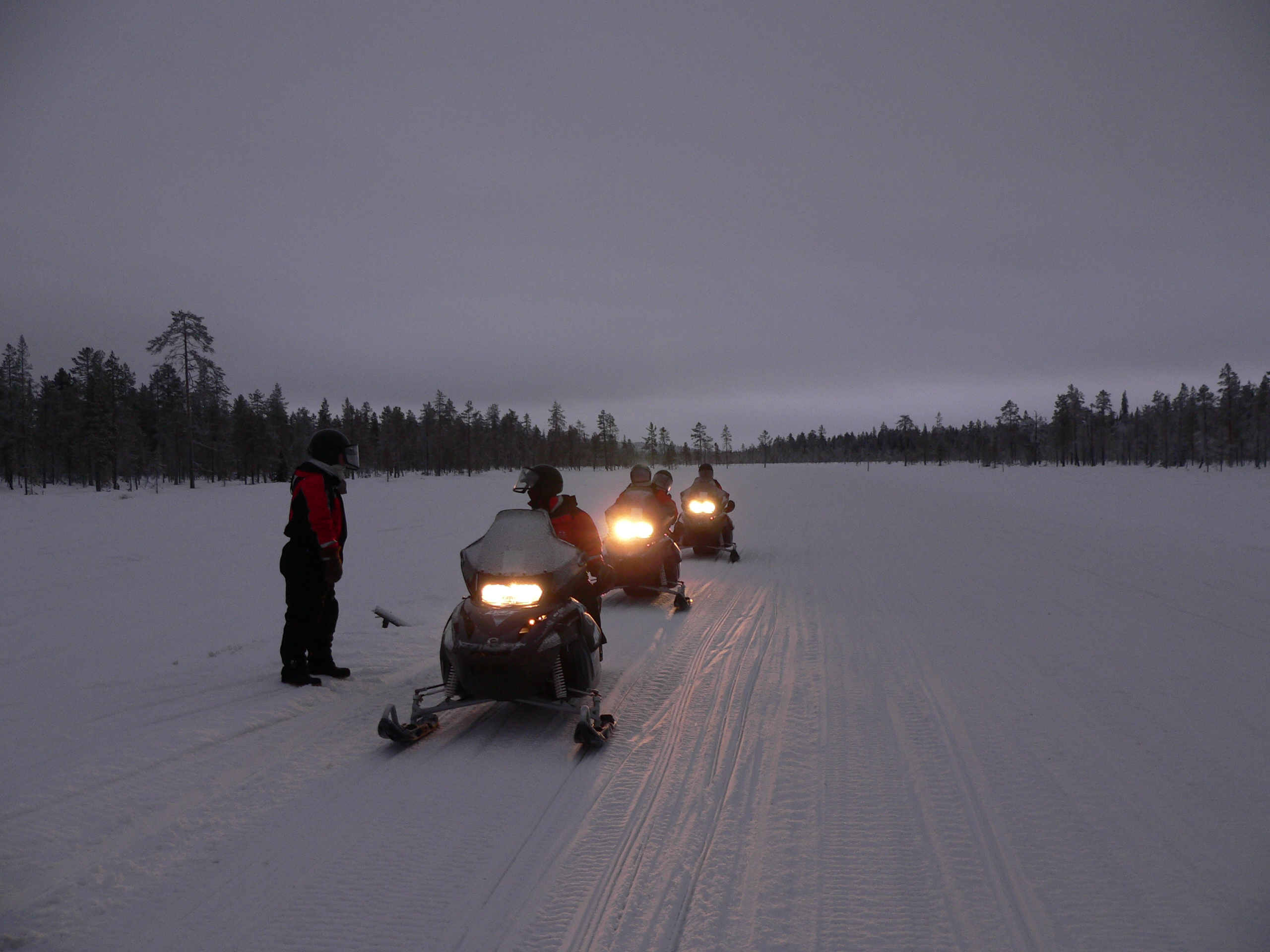
Snowmobile Safari

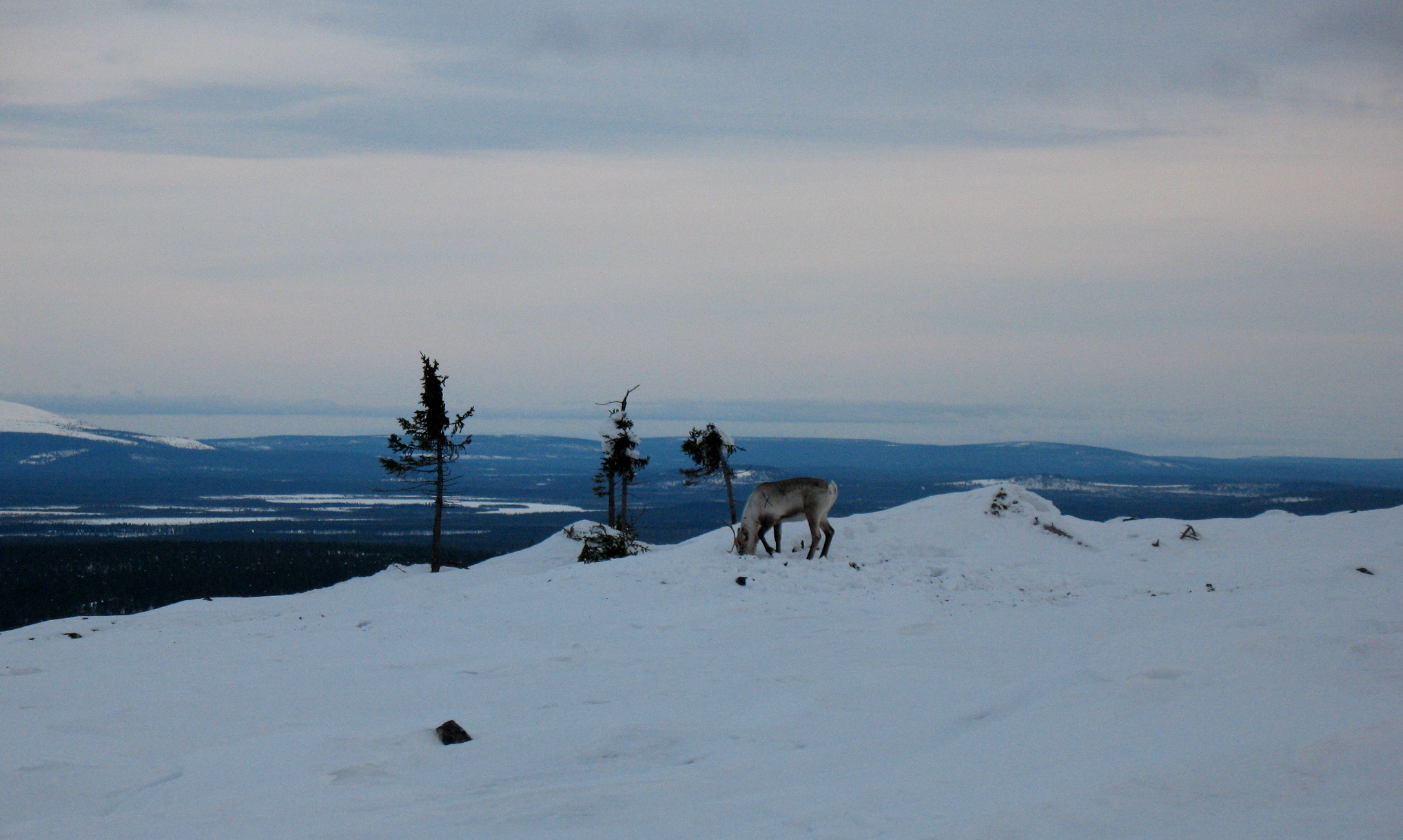
Reindeer on Levi fell in 2011

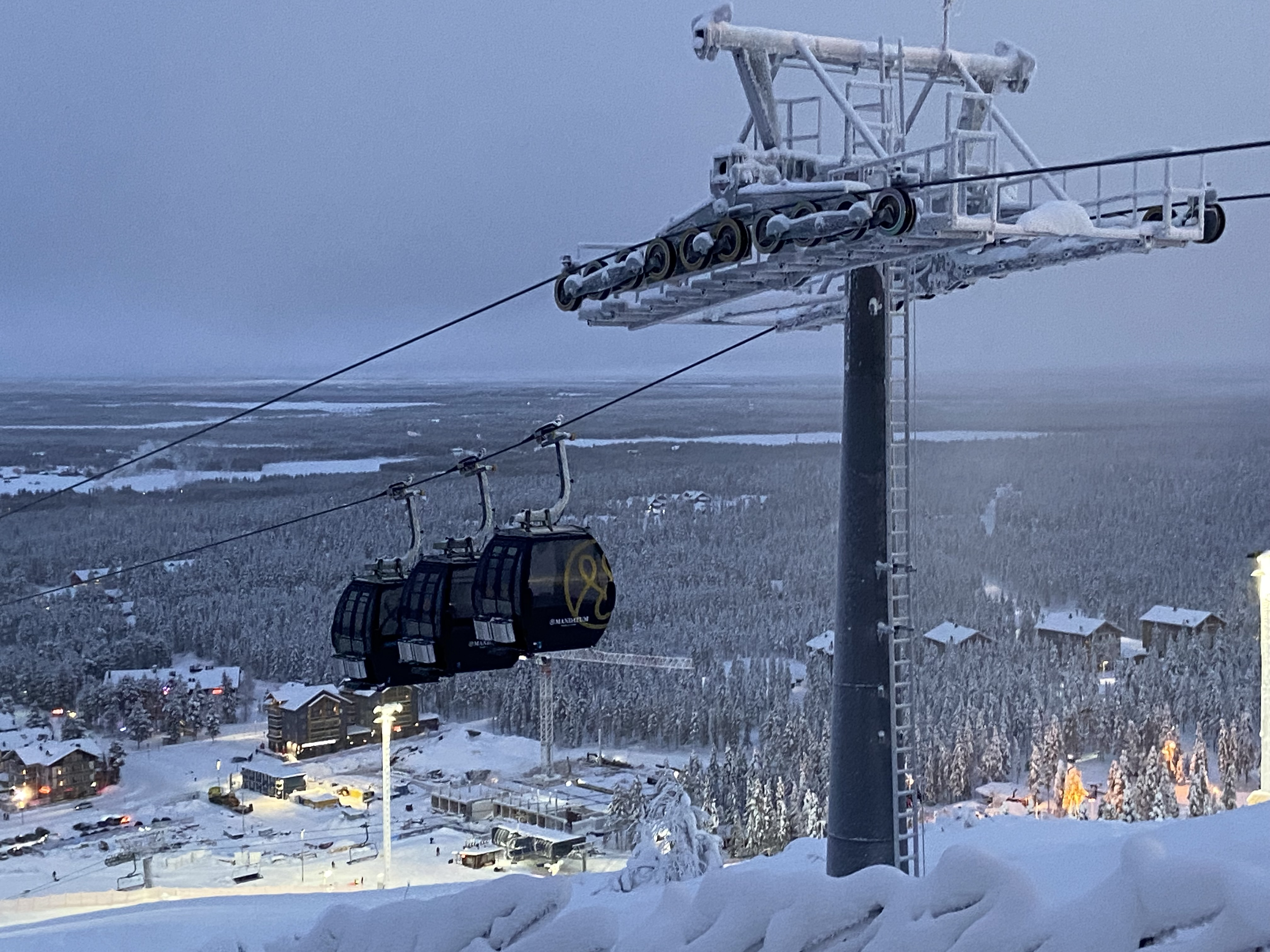
Gondola in January 2023

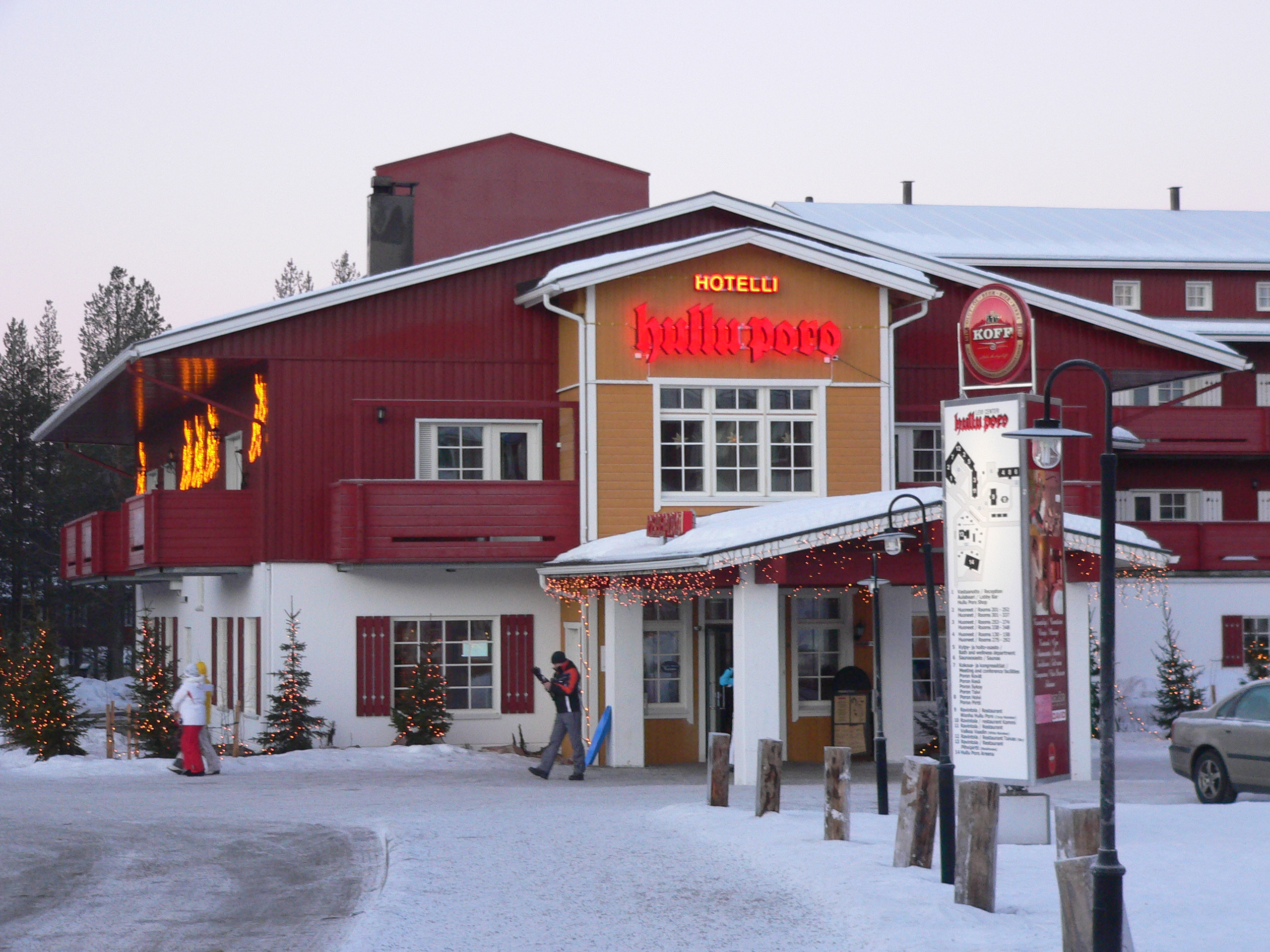
Hullu Poro Hotel

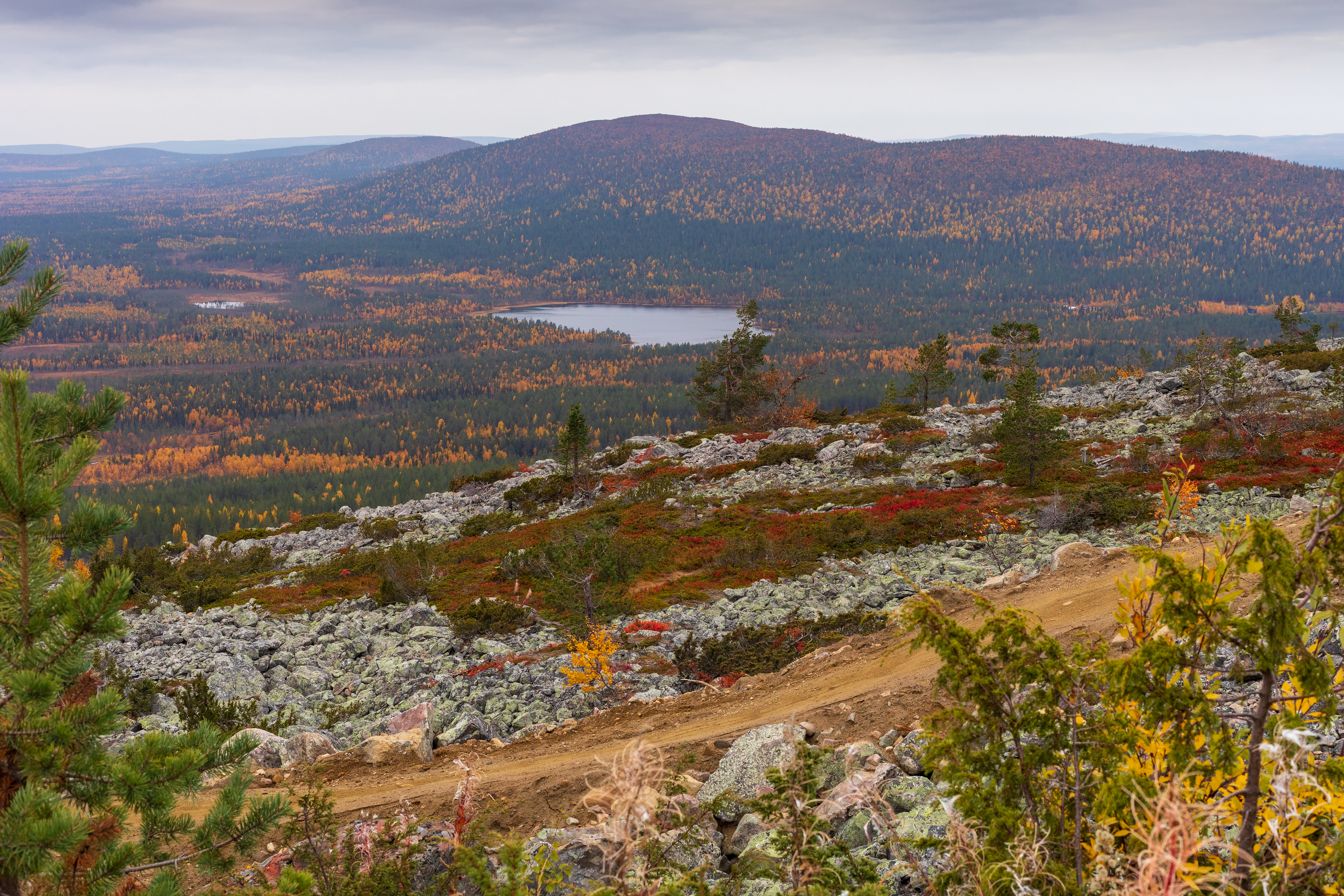
Mountain biking track in September 2021

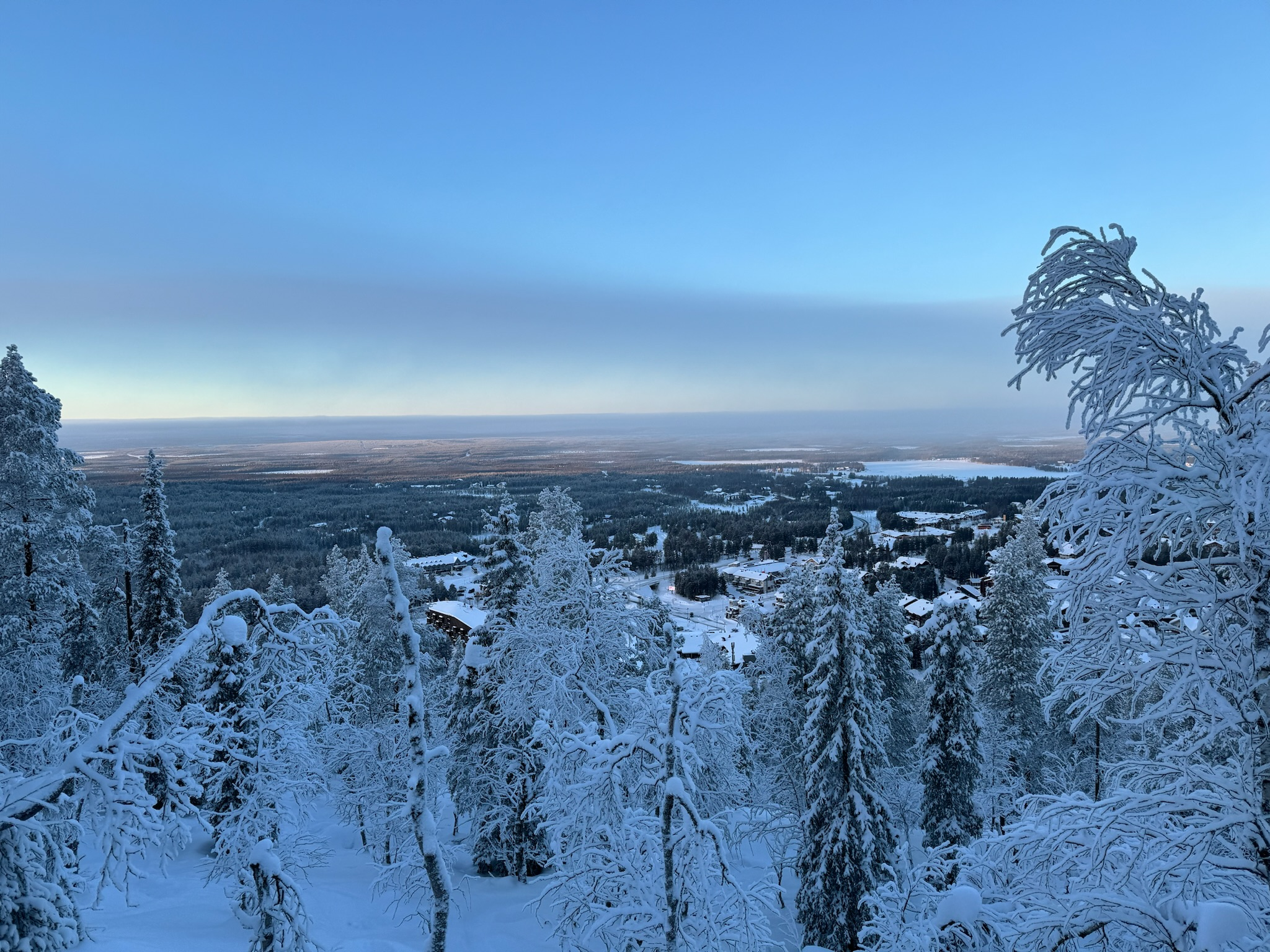
View at dusk looking over the snowy ski town of Levi

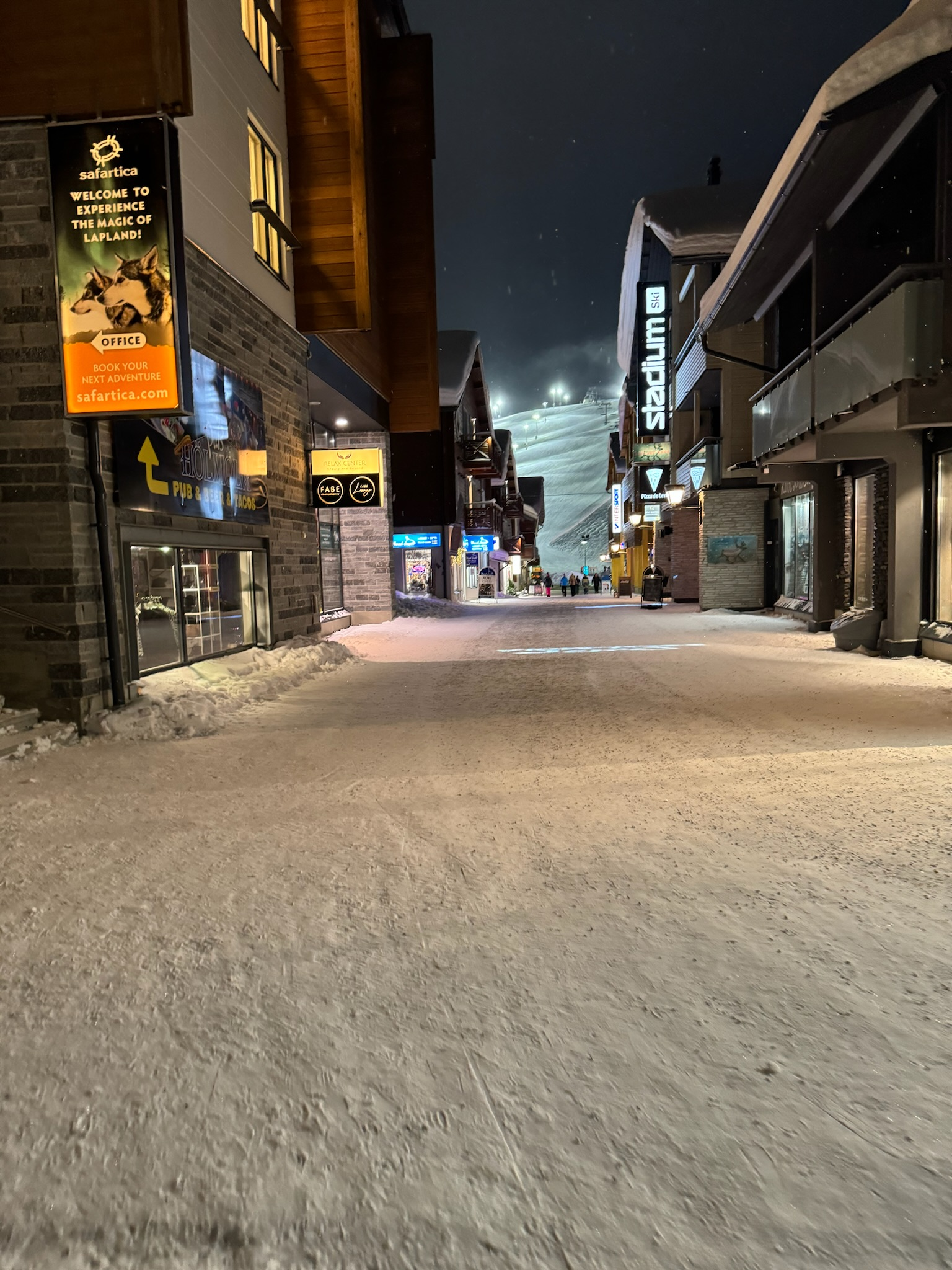
Snowy Levi street at night

== See also ==
- Ruka, Finland
