= Erkki Pulliainen =

Finnish zoologist, professor, and politician (1938–2022)

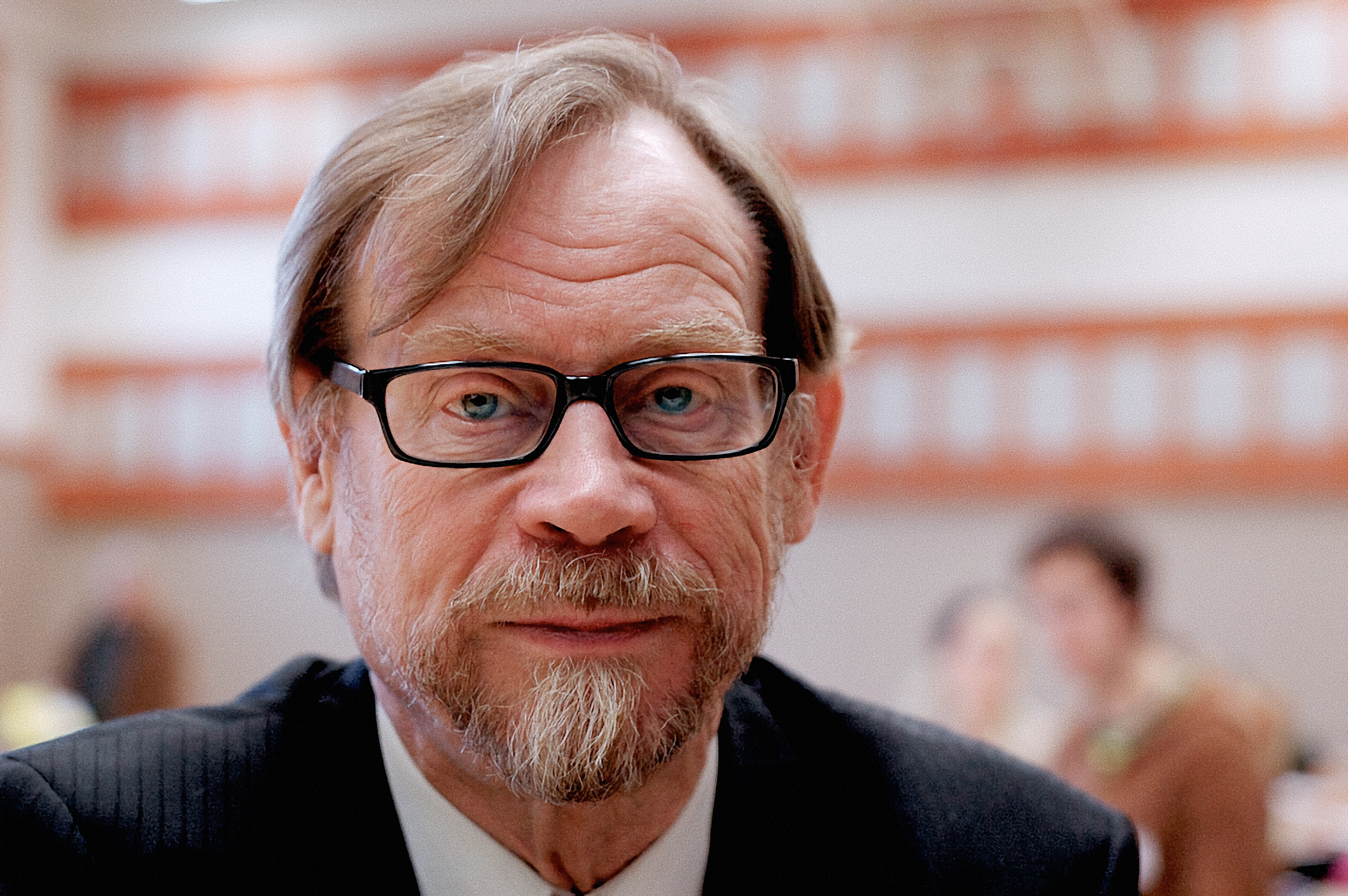
Erkki Pulliainen

Erkki Ossi Olavi Pulliainen (23 June 1938 – 22 August 2022) was a Finnish biologist and politician and member of Finnish Parliament, representing the Green League. He was first elected to the parliament in 1987 and was continuously a member until the election in spring 2011. From 1985 to 1999 he was also a member of the city council of Oulu. Pulliainen has held positions of trust in numerous scientific and political organisations.

Pulliainen was born in Varkaus, Finland. He had a Ph.D. in zoology and a master's degree in agriculture and forestry. During his career he has been the professor of zoology at the University of Oulu and the dean of the faculty of science until his retirement. He was also a reader at the University of Helsinki where he performed extensive research on large carnivores in the Nordic fauna. Pulliainen has published more than 500 scientific articles and more than 30 books. An expert on wolves and dogs, he was popularly known as "Susi" ("Wolf") Pulliainen.

Pulliainen was married to Riitta Haaranen and they have three children, Annariina (b. 1978), Annamiina (b. 1981), and Rauli (b. 1983). He also had two children, Harri (b. 1962), Virpi (b. 1963), from a previous marriage.
