= List of the busiest airports in France =

Below is a list of the busiest airports in France, including its overseas departments and territories.

== 2018 ==
Rank	Airport	Town/city	IATA	ICAO	Passengers 2018	Annual growth
1	Paris Charles de Gaulle	Paris	CDG	LFPG	72,229,723	▲4.0%
2	Paris Orly	Paris	ORY	LFPO	33,120,685	▲3.4%
3	Nice	Nice	NCE	LFMN	13,850,561	▲4.1%
4	Lyon Saint Exupéry	Lyon	LYS	LFLL	11,037,698	▲9.1%
5	Toulouse Blagnac	Toulouse	TLS	LFBO	9,630,308	▲3.9%
6	Marseille	Marseille	MRS	LFML	9,390,371	▲4.3%
7	Bâle Mulhouse	Mulhouse	MLH	LFSB	8,573,705	▲8.7%
8	Bordeaux Mérignac	Bordeaux	BOD	LFBD	6,799,572	▲9.3%
9	Nantes	Nantes	NTE	LFRS	6,199,181	▲12.9%
10	Beauvais	Beauvais	BVA	LFOB	3,787,086	▲3.8%
11	Réunion Roland Garros	Réunion	RUN	FMEE	2,473,843	▲7.9%
12	Pointe-à-Pitre	Pointe-à-Pitre	PTP	TFFR	2,442,455	▲3.4%

== 2014 ==
Rank	Airport	Town/city	IATA	ICAO	Passengers 2014	Annual growth	Change 14/13
1	Paris Charles de Gaulle	Paris	CDG	LFPG	63,813,756	▲2.8%	Steady
2	Paris Orly	Paris	ORY	LFPO	28,862,586	▲2.1%	Steady
3	Nice	Nice	NCE	LFMN	11,660,208	▲0.9%	Steady
4	Lyon Saint Exupéry	Lyon	LYS	LFLL	8,467,093	▼ -1.1%	Steady
5	Marseille	Marseille	MRS	LFML	8,182,237	▼ -0.9%	Steady
6	Toulouse Blagnac	Toulouse	TLS	LFBO	7,517,736	▼ -0.7%	Steady
7	Bâle Mulhouse	Mulhouse	MLH	LFSB	6,519,393	▲10.9%	Steady
8	Bordeaux Mérignac	Bordeaux	BOD	LFBD	4,945,029	▲7.1%	Steady
9	Nantes	Nantes	NTE	LFRS	4,157,284	▲5.8%	Steady
10	Beauvais	Beauvais	BVA	LFOB	4,024,201	▲1.8%	Steady
11	Pointe-à-Pitre	Pointe-à-Pitre	PTP	TFFR	2,029,080	▼ -0.2%	Steady
12	Réunion Roland Garros	Réunion	RUN	FMEE	2,014,111	▲0.6%	Steady
13	Fort-de-France	Fort-de-France	FDF	TFFF	1,684,879	▼0.0%	Steady
14	Lille Lesquin	Lille	LIL	LFQQ	1,596,700	▼ -3.9%	Steady
15	Montpellier Méditerranée	Montpellier	MPL	LFMT	1,445,273	▲1.6%	Steady
16	Ajaccio	Ajaccio	AJA	LFKJ	1,366,020	▲1.2%	Steady
17	Tahiti Faa'a	Tahiti	PPT	NTAA	1,171,617	▼1.8%	Steady
18	Strasbourg Entzheim	Strasbourg	SXB	LFST	1,167,612	▼ -1.1%	Steady
19	Bastia	Bastia	BIA	LFKB	1,162,840	▲3.3%	Steady
20	Biarritz	Biarritz	BIQ	LFBZ	1,064,402	▼ -3.1%	Steady
21	Brest	Brest	BES	LFRB	998,393	▼ -0.5%	Steady
22	Pau	Pau	PUF	LFBP	621,492	▼ -3.7%	Steady
23	Toulon	Toulon	TLN	LFTH	550,768	▼ -7.6%	Steady
24	Figari Sud Corse	Porto-Vecchio	FSC	LFKF	504,497	▲11.8%	Steady
25	Rennes	Rennes	RNS	LFRN	501,218	▲4.4%	Steady
26	Nouméa La Tontouta	Nouméa	NOU	NWWW	479,843	▲0.8%	Steady
27	Cayenne	Cayenne	CAY	SOCA	446,039	▲2.1%	Steady
28	Nouméa Magenta	Nouméa	GEA	NWWM	427,797	▲9.1%	Steady
29	Clermont-Ferrand	Clermont-Ferrand	CFE	LFLC	424,653	▼0.3%	Steady
30	Carcassonne	Carcassonne	CCF	LFMK	413,724	▼ -4.4%	Steady
31	Tarbes-Lourdes-Pyrénées	Tarbes / Lourdes	LDE	LFBT	388,258	▲1.6%	Steady
32	Perpignan	Perpignan	PGF	LFMP	353,872	▼ -3.5%	Steady
33	Mayotte	Mayotte	DZA	FMCZ	343,323	▲5.4%	Steady
34	Calvi	Calvi	CLY	LFKC	326,490	▲7.9%	Steady
35	Grenoble Isere	Grenoble	GNB	LFLS	320,647	▼ -5.0%	Steady
36	Limoges	Limoges	LIG	LFBL	290,792	▼ -3.0%	Steady
37	Bergerac	Bergerac	EGC	LFBE	277,312	▼ -3.1%	Steady
38	Bora Bora	Bora Bora	BOB	NTTB	270,535	▲2.1%	Steady
39	Metz Nancy Lorraine	Metz	ETZ	LFJL	245,781	▲1.1%	Steady
40	Béziers	Beziers	BZR	LFMU	243,980	▲7.0%	Steady
41	Chambéry	Chambery	CMF	LFLB	223,914	▲2.7%	Steady
42	La Rochelle	La Rochelle	LRH	LFBH	212,361	▼ -1.8%	Steady
43	Raiatea	Raiatea	RFP	NTTR	207,722	▲0.3%	Steady
44	Nîmes	Nimes	FNI	LFTW	207,553	▲6.3%	Steady
45	Saint Martin	Grand Case	SFG	TFFG	192,260	▼ -3.2%	Steady
46	Tours Val de Loire	Tours	TUF	LFOT	184,122	▲1.3%	Steady
47	Lifou	Lifou	LIF	NWWL	172,357	▲5.8%	Steady
48	Saint Barthelemy	Gustavia	SBH	TFFJ	168,530	▲3.6%	Steady
49	Saint Étienne	Saint Étienne	EBU	LFMH	150,236	▲12.3%	Steady
50	Lorient	Lorient	LRT	LFRH	123,274	▼ -25.8%	Steady
51	Rodez	Rodez	RDZ	LFCR	121,900	▼ -15.0%	Steady
52	Huahine	Huahine	HUH	NTTH	120,807	▼ -0.5%	Steady
53	Dole	Dole	DLE	LFGJ	115,731	▲44.6%	Steady
54	Caen	Caen	CFR	LFRK	115,015	▲9.5%	Steady
55	Deauville	Deauville	DOL	LFRG	114,984	▼ -17.0%	Steady
56	Dinard	Dinard	DNR	LFRD	114,016	▼ -12.8%	Steady
57	Poitiers	Poitiers	PIS	LFBI	109,537	▲1.5%	Steady
58	Quimper	Quimper	UIP	LFRQ	99,673	▼ -12.1%	Steady
59	Paris Vatry	Châlons-en-Champagne	XCR	LFOK	96,221	▼ -4.6%	Steady
60	Ile des Pins	Ile des Pins	ILP	NWWE	93,232	▲9.5%	Steady
61	Moorea	Moorea	MOZ	NTTM	89,772	▲4.9%	Steady
62	Ouvea	Ouvea	UVE	NWWV	83,451	▲9.9%	Steady
63	Maré	Maré	MEE	NWWR	80,142	▲11.9%	Steady
64	Rangiroa	Rangiroa	RGI	NTTG	73,490	▼ -3.9%	Steady
65	Saint Pierre	Saint Pierre	ZSE	FMEP	71,625	▼ -13.4%	Steady
66	Brive	Brive	BVE	LFSL	71,461	▲11.9%	Steady
67	Castres	Castres	DCM	LFCK	43,493	▲2.9%	Steady
68	Agen	Agen	AGF	LFBA	40,482	▲10.3%	Steady
69	Tikehau	Tikehau	TIH	NTGC	38,352	▲2.3%	Steady
70	Wallis Hihifo	Mata-Utu	WLS	NLWW	38,294	▼ -14.3%	Steady
71	Nuku Hiva	Nuku Hiva	NHV	NTMD	37,082	▼ -4.3%	Steady
72	Lannion	Lannion	LAI	LFRO	31,334	▼ -10.6%	Steady
73	Aurillac	Aurillac	AUR	LFLW	26,606	▲11.1%	Steady
74	Hiva Oa	Atuona	AUQ	NTMN	26,052	▼ -3.0%	Steady
76	Maupiti	Maupiti	MAU	NTTP	22,595	▲3.7%	Steady
75	Fakarava	Fakarava	FAV	NTGF	26,034	▲1.4%	Steady
77	Saint Nazaire	Saint Nazaire	SNR	LFRZ	22,459	▼ -9.4%	Steady

== 2013 ==
Rank	Airport	Town/city	IATA	ICAO	Passengers 2013	Annual growth	Change 13/12
1	Paris-Charles de Gaulle	Paris	CDG	LFPG	62,052,917	▲0.8%	Steady
2	Paris-Orly	Paris	ORY	LFPO	28,274,154	▲3.8%	Steady
3	Nice	Nice	NCE	LFMN	11,554,251	▲3.3%	Steady
4	Lyon St Exupéry	Lyon	LYS	LFLL	8,562,298	▲1.3%	Steady
5	Marseille	Marseille	MRS	LFML	8,260,619	▼ -0.4%	Steady
6	Toulouse Blagnac	Toulouse	TLS	LFBO	7,567,634	▲0.1%	Steady
7	Bâle Mulhouse	Mulhouse	MLH	LFSB	5,876,042	▲9.8%	Steady
8	Bordeaux Mérignac	Bordeaux	BOD	LFBD	4,617,608	▲4.3%	Steady
9	Paris Beauvais	Beauvais	BVA	LFOB	3,952,908	▲2.3%	Steady
10	Nantes	Nantes	NTE	LFRS	3,930,849	▲8.2%	Steady
11	Pointe-à-Pitre	Pointe-à-Pitre	PTP	TFFR	2,033,763	▲2.0%	Steady
12	Réunion Roland Garros	Réunion	RUN	FMEE	2,001,001	▼ -3.2%	Steady
13	Fort-de-France	Fort-de-France	FDF	TFFF	1,685,108	▲2.8%	Steady
14	Lille Lesquin	Lille	LIL	LFQQ	1,661,741	▲18.9%	Steady
15	Montpellier Méditerranée	Montpellier	MPL	LFMT	1,422,793	▲10.4%	Steady
16	Ajaccio	Ajaccio	AJA	LFKJ	1,350,431	▲10.8%	Steady
17	Strasbourg Entzheim	Strasbourg	SXB	LFST	1,181,149	▲1.3%	Steady
18	Tahiti Faa'a	Tahiti	PPT	NTAA	1,150,610	▼ -0.2%	Steady
19	Bastia	Bastia	BIA	LFKB	1,126,096	▲12.2%	Steady
20	Biarritz	Biarritz	BIQ	LFBZ	1,098,079	▲1.3%	Steady
21	Brest	Brest	BES	LFRB	1,003,836	▼ -6.2%	Steady
22	Pau	Pau	PUF	LFBP	645,577	▲5.9%	Steady
23	Toulon	Toulon	TLN	LFTH	582,132	▲0.6%	Steady
24	Rennes	Rennes	RNS	LFRN	480,237	▲6.0%	Steady
25	Nouméa La Tontouta	Nouméa	NOU	NWWW	476,174	▼ -2.1%	Steady
26	Figari Sud Corse	Porto-Vecchio	FSC	LFKF	451,446	▼ -1.7%	Steady
27	Cayenne	Cayenne	CAY	SOCA	436,991	▲2.6%	Steady
28	Carcassonne	Carcassonne	CCF	LFMK	432,712	▲9.3%	Steady
29	Clermont-Ferrand	Clermont-Ferrand	CFE	LFLC	425,896	▲10.4%	Steady
30	Nouméa Magenta	Nouméa	GEA	NWWM	392,317	▲1.8%	Steady
31	Tarbes-Lourdes-Pyrénées	Tarbes / Lourdes	LDE	LFBT	382,186	▼ -6.7%	Steady
32	Perpignan	Perpignan	PGF	LFMP	366,551	▲4.8%	Steady
33	Grenoble Isere	Grenoble	GNB	LFLS	337,603	▲7.5%	Steady
34	Mayotte	Mayotte	DZA	FMCZ	325,670	▲7.1%	Steady
35	Calvi	Calvi	CLY	LFKC	302,672	▼ -3.2%	Steady
36	Limoges	Limoges	LIG	LFBL	299,654	▼ -2.3%	Steady
37	Bergerac	Bergerac	EGC	LFBE	286,226	▲15.2%	Steady
38	Bora Bora	Bora Bora	BOB	NTTB	264,103	▲4.3%	Steady
39	Metz Nancy Lorraine	Metz	ETZ	LFJL	242,995	▼ -12.5%	Steady
40	Chambéry	Chambery	CMF	LFLB	218,120	▼ -4.5%	Steady
41	La Rochelle	La Rochelle	LRH	LFBH	216,221	▼ -8.7%	Steady
42	Béziers	Beziers	BZR	LFMU	228,024	▲1.9%	Steady
43	Raiatea	Raiatea	RFP	NTTR	207,065	▲1.3%	Steady
44	Saint Martin	Grand Case	SFG	TFFG	198,603	▼ -0.2%	Steady
45	Nîmes	Nimes	FNI	LFTW	195,319	▲5.7%	Steady
46	Tours Val de Loire	Tours	TUF	LFOT	181,769	▲7.3%	Steady
47	Lorient	Lorient	LRT	LFRH	166,034	▼ -5.8%	Steady
48	Lifou	Lifou	LIF	NWWL	162,836	▲0.5%	Steady
49	Saint Barthelemy	Gustavia	SBH	TFFJ	162,641	▲6.9%	Steady
50	Rodez	Rodez	RDZ	LFCR	143,392	▼ -8.4%	Steady
51	Deauville	Deauville	DOL	LFRG	138,554	▼ -2.6%	Steady
52	Saint Étienne	Saint Étienne	EBU	LFMH	133,807	▲21.1%	Steady
53	Dinard	Dinard	DNR	LFRD	130,771	▼ -5.6%	Steady
54	Huahine	Huahine	HUH	NTTH	121,431	▲0.6%	Steady
55	Quimper	Quimper	UIP	LFRQ	113,419	▲3.0%	Steady
56	Poitiers	Poitiers	PIS	LFBI	107,964	▼ -8.8%	Steady
57	Caen	Caen	CFR	LFRK	105,022	▲4.2%	Steady
58	Paris Vatry	Châlons-en-Champagne	XCR	LFOK	100,857	▲14.9%	Steady
59	Moorea	Moorea	MOZ	NTTM	85,542	▼ -5.8%	Steady
60	Ile des Pins	Ile des Pins	ILP	NWWE	85,109	▲0.4%	Steady
61	Saint Pierre	Saint Pierre	ZSE	FMEP	82,748	▼ -13.6%	Steady
62	Dole	Dole	DLE	LFGJ	80,028	▲132.2%	Steady
63	Ouvea	Ouvea	UVE	NWWV	75,952	▲4.6%	Steady
64	Rangiroa	Rangiroa	RGI	NTTG	75,486	▼ -6.0%	Steady
65	Mare	Mare	MEE	NWWR	71,601	▲6.0%	Steady
66	Brive	Brive	BVE	LFSL	63,877	▲11.9%	Steady
67	Wallis Hihifo	Mata-Utu	WLS	NLWW	44,681	▲2.6%	Steady
68	Castres	Castres	DCM	LFCK	42,278	▲7.0%	Steady
69	Nuku Hiva	Nuku Hiva	NHV	NTMD	38,755	▼ -1.5%	Steady
70	Tikehau	Tikehau	TIH	NTGC	37,490	▲6.8%	Steady
71	Agen	Agen	AGF	LFBA	36,716	▲8.6%	Steady
72	Lannion	Lannion	LAI	LFRO	35,119	▲7.6%	Steady
73	Hiva Oa	Atuona	AUQ	NTMN	26,849	▲3.0%	Steady
74	Fakarava	Fakarava	FAV	NTGF	25,686	▲2.4%	Steady
75	Dijon	Dijon	DIJ	LFSD	25,551	▼ -37.0%	Steady
76	Saint Nazaire	Saint Nazaire	SNR	LFRZ	24,793	▲22.0%	Steady
77	Aurillac	Aurillac	AUR	LFLW	23,958	▼ -10.0%	Steady
78	Maupiti	Maupiti	MAU	NTTP	21,783	▲5.5%	Steady
79	Rurutu	Rurutu	RUR	NTAR	20,671	▼ -1.6%	Steady
80	Tubuai Mataura	Tubuai	TUB	NTAT	20,573	▲0.0%	Steady

Source: Wayback Machine

== 2012 ==
Rank	Airport	Town/city	IATA	ICAO	Passengers 2012	Annual growth	Change 12/11
1	Paris-Charles de Gaulle	Paris	CDG	LFPG	61,556,202	▲1%	Steady
2	Paris-Orly	Paris	ORY	LFPO	27,232,263	▲0.3%	Steady
3	Nice	Nice	NCE	LFMN	11,189,896	▲7.4%	Steady
4	Lyon St Exupéry	Lyon	LYS	LFLL	8,451,039	▲0.2%	Steady
5	Marseille	Marseille	MRS	LFML	8,295,479	▲12.7%	Steady
6	Toulouse Blagnac	Toulouse	TLS	LFBO	7,559,350	▲8.2%	Steady
7	Bâle Mulhouse	Mulhouse	MLH	LFSB	5,349,872	▲6%	Steady
8	Bordeaux Mérignac	Bordeaux	BOD	LFBD	4,428,072	▲7.7%	Steady
9	Paris Beauvais	Beauvais	BVA	LFOB	3,862,562	▲5%	Steady
10	Nantes	Nantes	NTE	LFRS	3,631,693	▲11.9%	Steady
11	Réunion Roland Garros	Réunion	RUN	FMEE	2,067,764	▼3.3%	Steady
12	Pointe-à-Pitre	Pointe-à-Pitre	PTP	TFFR	1,994,575	▼2.7%	Steady
13	Fort-de-France	Fort-de-France	FDF	TFFF	1,639,749	▼5.1%	Steady
14	Lille Lesquin	Lille	LIL	LFQQ	1,397,637	▲20%	Steady
15	Montpellier Méditerranée	Montpellier	MPL	LFMT	1,288,215	▼1.9%	Steady
16	Ajaccio	Ajaccio	AJA	LFKJ	1,218,705	▲3.6%	Steady
17	Strasbourg Entzheim	Strasbourg	SXB	LFST	1,166,110	▲8%	Steady
18	Tahiti Faa'a	Tahiti	PPT	NTAA	1,152,593	▼1.5%	Steady
19	Biarritz	Biarritz	BIQ	LFBZ	1,084,200	▲5%	Steady
20	Brest	Brest	BES	LFRB	1,070,461	▲8%	Steady
21	Bastia	Bastia	BIA	LFKB	1,003,728	▼2.1%	Steady
22	Pau	Pau	PUF	LFBP	609,535	▼5%	Steady
23	Toulon	Toulon	TLN	LFTH	578,881	▲0.1%	Steady
24	Nouméa La Tontouta	Nouméa	NOU	NWWW	486,171	▼1.4%	Steady
25	Figari	Figari	FSC	LFKF	459,049	▲3.4%	Steady
26	Rennes	Rennes	RNS	LFRN	453,121	▲4.7%	Steady
27	Cayenne	Cayenne	CAY	SOCA	425,941	▼2.2%	Steady
28	Tarbes-Lourdes-Pyrénées	Tarbes / Lourdes	LDE	LFBT	409,465	▼9.5%	Steady
29	Carcassonne	Carcassonne	CCF	LFMK	395,733	▲7.5%	Steady
30	Clermont-Ferrand	Clermont-Ferrand	CFE	LFLC	385,676	▼3.3%	Steady
31	Nouméa Magenta	Nouméa	GEA	NWWM	385,303	▲12%	Steady
32	Perpignan	Perpignan	PGF	LFMP	349,871	▼5.6%	Steady
33	Grenoble Isere	Grenoble	GNB	LFLS	314,183	▼6.7%	Steady
34	Calvi	Calvi	CLY	LFKC	312,623	▲6.2%	Steady
35	Limoges	Limoges	LIG	LFBL	306,837	▼8.4%	Steady
36	Mayotte	Mayotte	DZA	FMCZ	303,980	▼5.1%	Steady
37	Bergerac	Bergerac	EGC	LFBE	284,393	▼1.6%	Steady
38	Metz Nancy Lorraine	Metz	ETZ	LFJL	277,780	▼0.4%	Steady
39	Bora Bora	Bora Bora	BOB	NTTB	253,115	▼0.7%	Steady
40	La Rochelle	La Rochelle	LRH	LFBH	236,736	▲3.3%	Steady
41	Chambéry	Chambery	CMF	LFLB	228,291	▼2.3%	Steady
42	Béziers	Beziers	BZR	LFMU	223,807	▲15.3%	Steady
43	Raiatea	Raiatea	RFP	NTTR	204,424	▲0.9%	Steady
44	Saint Martin	Grand Case	SFG	TFFG	199,005	▼4.8%	Steady
45	Nîmes	Nimes	FNI	LFTW	184,850	▼4%	Steady
46	Lorient	Lorient	LRT	LFRH	176,331	▼3.1%	Steady
47	Tours Val de Loire	Tours	TUF	LFOT	169,341	▲39.9%	Steady
48	Lifou	Lifou	LIF	NWWL	162,001	▲19.9%	Steady
49	Rodez	Rodez	RDZ	LFCR	156,474	▲10.6%	Steady
50	Saint Barthelemy	Gustavia	SBH	TFFJ	152,168	▲0.7%	Steady
51	Deauville	Deauville	DOL	LFRG	142,230	▲9.6%	Steady
52	Dinard	Dinard	DNR	LFRD	138,478	▲3.2%	Steady
53	Huahine	Huahine	HUH	NTTH	120,706	▼16.4%	Steady
54	Poitiers	Poitiers	PIS	LFBI	118,383	▲8%	Steady
55	Saint Étienne	Saint Étienne	EBU	LFMH	110,471	▲2.6%	Steady
56	Quimper	Quimper	UIP	LFRQ	110,073	▼2.2%	Steady
57	Caen	Caen	CFR	LFRK	100,769	▲0.7%	Steady
58	Saint Pierre	Saint Pierre	ZSE	FMEP	95,774	▼11.4%	Steady
59	Moorea	Moorea	MOZ	NTTM	90,766	▼8.3%	Steady
60	Paris Vatry	Châlons-en-Champagne	XCR	LFOK	87,745	▲71.6%	Steady
61	Ile des Pins	Ile des Pins	ILP	NWWE	84,778	▲5.2%	Steady
62	Rangiroa	Rangiroa	RGI	NTTG	80,392	▲6%	Steady
63	Ouvea	Ouvea	UVE	NWWV	72,616	▲8.7%	Steady
64	Mare	Mare	MEE	NWWR	67,555	▲11.3%	Steady
65	Brive	Brive	BVE	LFSL	57,083	▼6.4%	Steady
66	Wallis Hihifo	Mata-Utu	WLS	NLWW	43,543	▲1.2%	Steady
67	Dijon	Dijon	DIJ	LFSD	42,167	▼8.6%	Steady
68	Castres	Castres	DCM	LFCK	39,508	▲4.5%	Steady
69	Nuku Hiva	Nuku Hiva	NHV	NTMD	39,342	▼7.4%	Steady
70	Tikehau	Tikehau	TIH	NTGC	35,119	▼3.7%	Steady
71	Dole	Dole	DLE	LFGJ	34,459	▲952.2%	Steady
72	Agen	Agen	AGF	LFBA	33,803	▼3.7%	Steady
73	Lannion	Lannion	LAI	LFRO	32,635	▼7.9%	Steady
74	Avignon	Avignon	AVN	LFMV	29,965	▲0.1%	Steady
75	Aurillac	Aurillac	AUR	LFLW	26,620	▲0.1%	Steady
76	Hiva Oa	Atuona	AUQ	NTMN	26,065	▼8.8%	Steady
77	Fakarava	Fakarava	FAV	NTGF	25,079	▼7.9%	Steady
78	Le Havre	Le Havre	LEH	LFOH	23,934	▼18%	Steady
79	Rurutu	Rurutu	RUR	NTAR	21,002	▼9.9%	Steady
80	Maupiti	Maupiti	MAU	NTTP	20,657	▲11.4%	Steady
81	Tubuai Mataura	Tubuai	TUB	NTAT	20,579	▼7.8%	Steady
82	Saint Nazaire	Saint Nazaire	SNR	LFRZ	20,318	▲40.1%	Steady

Source: Wayback Machine

== 2011 ==
Rank	Airport	Town/city	IATA	ICAO	Passengers 2011	Annual growth	Change 11/10
1	Paris-Charles de Gaulle	Paris	CDG	LFPG	60,970,551	▲4.8%	Steady
2	Paris-Orly	Paris	ORY	LFPO	27,139,076	▲7.7%	Steady
3	Nice Côte d'Azur Airport	Nice	NCE	LFMN	10,422,073	▲8.5%	Steady
4	Lyon Saint-Exupéry Airport	Lyon	LYS	LFLL	8,437,141	▲5.7%	Steady
5	Marseille Provence Airport	Marseille	MRS	LFML	7,363,068	▼2.1%	Steady
6	Toulouse Blagnac Airport	Toulouse	TLS	LFBO	6,988,140	▲9.1%	Steady
7	Basel-Mulhouse International Airport	Mulhouse	MLH	LFSB	5,048,428	▲22.4%	Steady
8	Bordeaux - Mérignac Airport	Bordeaux	BOD	LFBD	4,112,575	▲12.4%	Steady
9	Paris Beauvais	Beauvais	BVA	LFOB	3,677,794	▲25.4%	▲1
10	Nantes Atlantique Airport	Nantes	NTE	LFRS	3,246,226	▲7.1%	▼1
11	Roland Garros Airport	La Réunion	RUN	FMEE	2,138,533	▲8.5%	Steady
12	Pointe-à-Pitre International Airport	Pointe-à-Pitre	PTP	TFRR	2,050,471	▲5.2%	Steady
13	Martinique Aimé Césaire International Airport	Fort-de-France	FDF	TFFF	1,727,911	▲3.4%	Steady
14	Montpellier Airport	Montpellier	MPL	LFMT	1,313,276	▲11.3%	▲1
15	Ajaccio - Napoléon Bonaparte Airport	Ajaccio	AJA	LFKJ	1,175,874	▲5.5%	▲2
16	Faaʻa International Airport	Faʻaʻā	PPT	NTAA	1,169,819	▼3.4%	▼2
17	Lille - Lesquin Airport	Lille	LIL	LFQQ	1,164,631	▼0.5%	▼1
18	Strasbourg Airport	Strasbourg	SXB	LFST	1,080,046	▲1.8%	Steady
19	Biarritz Airport	Biarritz	BIQ	LFBZ	1,032,937	▲4.4%	▲1
20	Bastia Poretta Airport	Bastia	BIA	LFKB	1,025,346	▲1.8%	▼1

Source: Wayback Machine

== 2010 ==
Rank	Airport	Town/city	IATA	Passengers 2010	Annual growth	Change 10/09
1	Paris-Charles de Gaulle	Paris	CDG	58,164,612	▲0,4%	Steady
2	Paris-Orly	Paris	ORY	25,203,969	▲0,4%	Steady
3	Nice Côte d'Azur Airport	Nice	NCE	9,603,014	▼2.3%	Steady
4	Lyon Saint-Exupéry Airport	Lyon	LYS	7,979,228	▲3.4%	Steady
5	Marseille Provence Airport	Marseille	MRS	7,524,886	▲3.2%	Steady
6	Toulouse Blagnac Airport	Toulouse	TLS	6,405,906	▲2.0%	Steady
7	Basel-Mulhouse International Airport	Mulhouse	MLH	4,129,186	▲7.1%	Steady
8	Bordeaux - Mérignac Airport	Bordeaux	BOD	3,663,702	▲10.5%	Steady
9	Nantes Atlantique Airport	Nantes	NTE	3,031,556	▲14.3%	Steady
10	Paris Beauvais	Beauvais	BVA	2,931,796	▲13.1%	Steady
11	Roland Garros Airport	La Réunion	RUN	1,970,575	▲12.6%	▲2
12	Pointe-à-Pitre International Airport	Pointe-à-Pitre	PTP	1,948,813	▲5,9%	▼1
13	Martinique Aimé Césaire International Airport	Fort-de-France	FDF	1,680,647	▲2.4%	▼1
14	Faaʻa International Airport	Faʻaʻā	PPT	1,183,273	▼4.0%	Steady
15	Montpellier Airport	Montpellier	MPL	1,180,448	▼3.6%	▼1
16	Lille - Lesquin Airport	Lille	LIL	1,170,693	▲1.9%	▲3
17	Ajaccio - Napoléon Bonaparte Airport	Ajaccio	AJA	1,114,573	▲2.2%	Steady
18	Strasbourg Airport	Strasbourg	SXB	1,060,705	▼4.3%	▼3
19	Bastia Poretta Airport	Bastia	BIA	1,007,408	▼0.4%	▲1
20	Biarritz Airport	Biarritz	BIQ	989,622	▼2.1%	▼2

Source: Wayback Machine

== 2007-2008 ==
Rank	Airport	Town/city	IATA	Passengers 2008	Passengers 2007	Rank 2007	Change 08/07
1	Paris-Charles de Gaulle	Paris	CDG	60,874,681	59,922,177	1	+1,6%
2	Paris-Orly	Paris	ORY	26,209,703	26,440,736	2	-0,9%
3	Nice Côte d'Azur Airport	Nice	NCE	10,382,566	10,399,513	3	-0.2%
4	Lyon Saint-Exupéry Airport	Lyon	LYS	7,924,063	7,320,952	4	+8.2%
5	Marseille Provence Airport	Marseille	MRS	6,965,933	6,962,773	5	+0.03%
6	Toulouse Blagnac Airport	Toulouse	TLS	6,349,805	6,162,288	6	+3%
7	Basel-Mulhouse International Airport	Mulhouse	MLH	4,257,169	4,269,124	7	-0.25%
8	Bordeaux - Mérignac Airport	Bordeaux	BOD	3,519,000	3,463,205	8	+2.8%
9	Nantes Atlantique Airport	Nantes	NTE	2,731,563	2,589,890	9	+5.47%
10	Paris Beauvais	Beauvais	BVA	2,484,635	2,155,633	10	+15.3%
11	Pointe-à-Pitre International Airport	Pointe-à-Pitre	PTP	2,020,042	1,960,912	11	+3%
12	Martinique Aimé Césaire International Airport	Fort-de-France	FDF	1,673,610	1,695,741	13	-1.3%
13	Roland Garros Airport	La Réunion	RUN	1,654,105	1,594,805	14	+3.7%
14	Faaʻa International Airport	Faʻaʻā	PPT	1,379,832	1,511,340	15	-8.7%
15	Strasbourg Airport	Strasbourg	SXB	1,329,000	1,733,050	12	-23.3%
16	Montpellier Airport	Montpellier	MPL	1,256,391	1,286,875	16	-2.4%
17	Ajaccio - Campo dell'Oro Airport	Ajaccio	AJA	1,072,768	1,025,119	18	+4.6%
18	Biarritz Airport	Biarritz	BIQ	1,028,006	930,880	19	+10.4%
19	Lille - Lesquin Airport	Lille	LIL	1,014,704	1,051,758	17	-3.5%
20	Bastia Poretta Airport	Bastia	BIA	933,695	860,046	20	+8.6%
21	Brest Bretagne Airport	Brest	BES	874,747	850,433	21	+2.9%
22	Pau Pyrénées Airport	Pau	PUF	817,511	763,018	22	+7.1%
23	Tarbes-Lourdes-Pyrénées Airport	Tarbes-Lourdes	LDE	678,897	444,258	26	+52.8%
24	Toulon-Hyères Airport	Toulon	TLN	629,412	646,053	23	-2.6%
25	Grenoble Airport	Grenoble	GNB	474,083	469,658	25	+0.94%

Source : Wayback Machine

== See also ==
- Top 10 Busiest Airports in the World
