= NTTP =

NTTP may refer to:

- The ICAO code for Maupiti Airport
- Non-type template parameter, a type of parameter in a template (C++)
- 7-Nitroso-3-(trifluoromethyl)-5,6,7,8-tetrahydro[1,2,4]triazolo[4,3-a]pyrazine a Nitrosamine
