= NTTR =

NTTR may refer to:

- Nevada Test and Training Range, a USAF military region in the United States that began as the Tonopah Bombing Range
  - Nevada Test and Training Range (military unit), the former USAF wing which is responsible for the Nevada range
- Raiatea Airport, in French Polynesia
