= Brive–Souillac Airport =

French airport in the Dordogne

Brive–Souillac Airport Aéroport de Brive – Vallée de la Dordogne
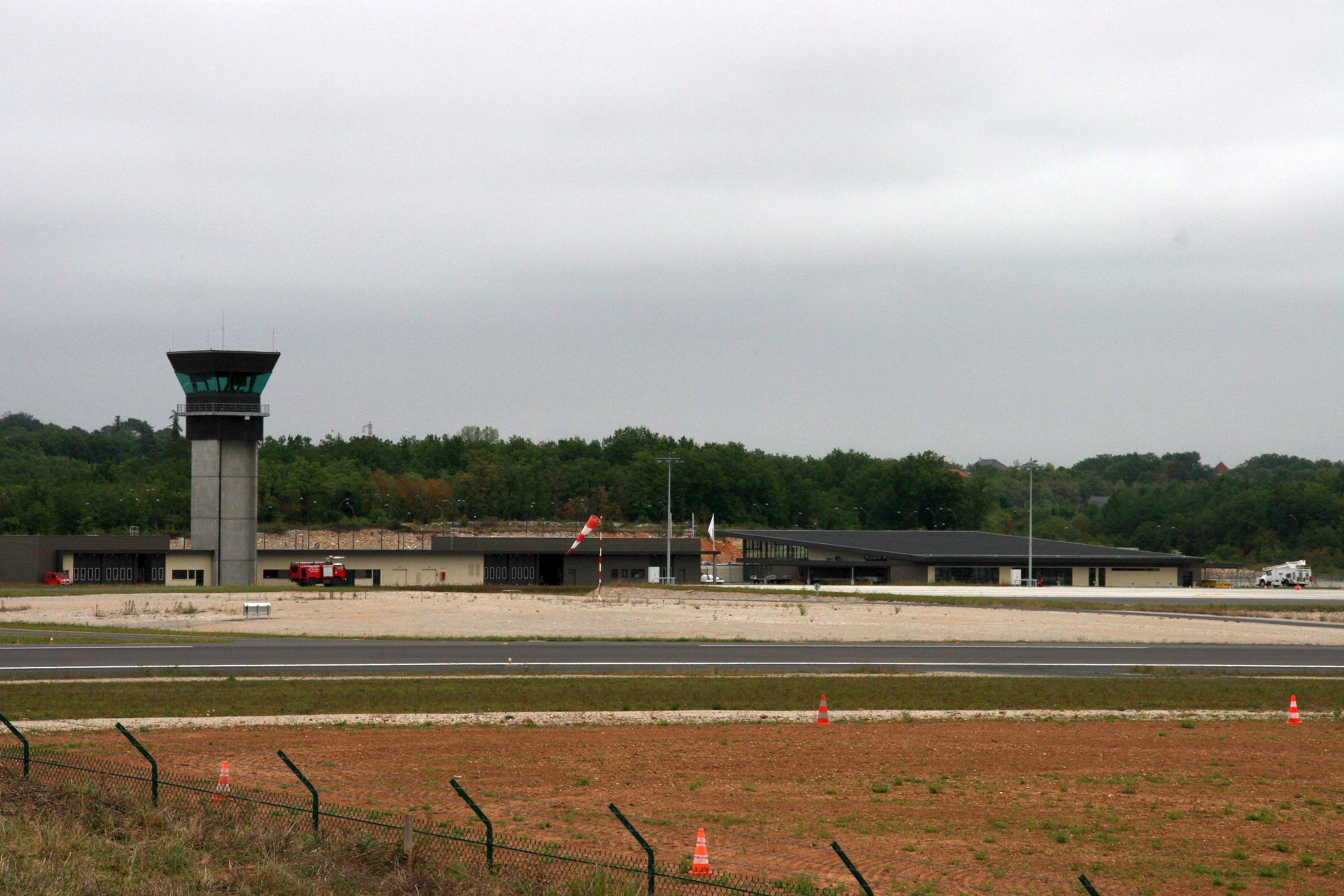
- IATA: BVE; ICAO: LFSL

Summary
- Airport type: Public
- Operator: Régie personnalisée de l'aéroport de Brive-Souillac
- Serves: Brive-la-Gaillarde, France
- Elevation AMSL: 1,016 ft (310 m)
- Coordinates: 45°02′23″N 01°29′08″E
- Website: aeroport-brive-vallee-dordogne.com

Map
- Location of airport in the Nouvelle-Aquitaine region LFSL (France)

Runways
Direction	Length		Surface
Direction	m	ft	Surface
11/29	2,100	6,890	Paved
11R/29L	1,000	3,281	Unpaved
- Source: French AIP

Brive–Souillac Airport (IATA: BVE, ICAO: LFSL), also Brive–Dordogne Valley Airport (French: Aéroport de Brive – Vallée de la Dordogne), is an international airport located 13 kilometres (7.0 NM) south of Brive-la-Gaillarde, a commune of the Corrèze department in the Nouvelle-Aquitaine region of France.

The airport caters for tourist movements into the Dordogne area.

== History ==
The idea for the new airport started in 1983 when the existing Brive–La Roche Airport, west of the Brive-la-Gaillarde CBD became unsuitable for modern aircraft and safety standards. By 1987, 200ha of land was found between Nespouls and Cressensac. A syndicate was formed between the mayors of Brive-la-Gaillarde, Jean Charbonnel and Souillac, Alain Chastagnol to push for the project's creation. A 1998 plan was updated in 2001 when a decision was made to extend the runway from 1.9 km to 2.1 km prior to construction, rather than extend it sometime in the future after the project had been completed.

The project was delayed by court cases, politicians and environmental organisations such as the commune of Turenne and Query Périgord and candidates for d’Europe Écologie in the European Parliamentary elections. Most regarded it as a large international project that could not be managed on a local scale, while other concerns included the effect on public finances, opposition from Limoges Airport, noise pollution and a colony of the large blue butterfly.

Earthworks began in October 2005 and continued until spring 2007 as the 200ha limestone site needed to be levelled and filled. 2.8 million m3 of earth was moved during these earthworks. The runway, 2.1 km long and 45m wide, was laid down in 2008, as were taxiways and aprons, while the building work for the airport control tower and buildings was underway in 2009. The official inauguration was on 15 June 15, 2010.

Its ICAO code LFSL was previously assigned to the military Toul-Rosières Air Base, which closed in 2004. The Airlinair (HOP!) flights to and from Paris–Orly airport were transferred to this airport.

=== Funding ===
The project cost €48.7 million. €27.7 was raised by the Syndicate supported by the Department of the Correze, with the EU, French state and regional government providing €11.8. The rest was funded by the Department of the Lot, regional towns, chambers of commerce and agriculture.

== Facilities ==
The airport resides at an elevation of 1,016 feet (310 m) above mean sea level. It has one paved runway designated 11/29 which measures 2,100 by 45 metres (6,890 ft × 148 ft). It also has a parallel unpaved runway with a grass surface measuring 1,000 by 80 metres (3,281 ft × 262 ft).

In addition to the main terminal that handles both international and local passengers, there is a VIP and business aviation building as well as facilities for private flying clubs. The car park has capacity for 250 cars and is open 24 hours. The airport has taxi access and car rental facilities managed by Europcar and Hertz.

== Airlines and destinations ==
The following airlines operate regular scheduled and charter flights at Brive–Souillac Airport:

Airlines	Destinations
Chalair Aviation	Paris–Orly; Seasonal: Ajaccio, Brussels, Kerry, Nice
Ryanair	Seasonal: London–Stansted

== Statistics ==
Up to 2010: stats for the old airport; stats from 2010 are for this airport:
