= Lannion–Côte de Granit Airport =

Lannion–Côte de Granit Airport Aéroport de Lannion–Côte de Granit
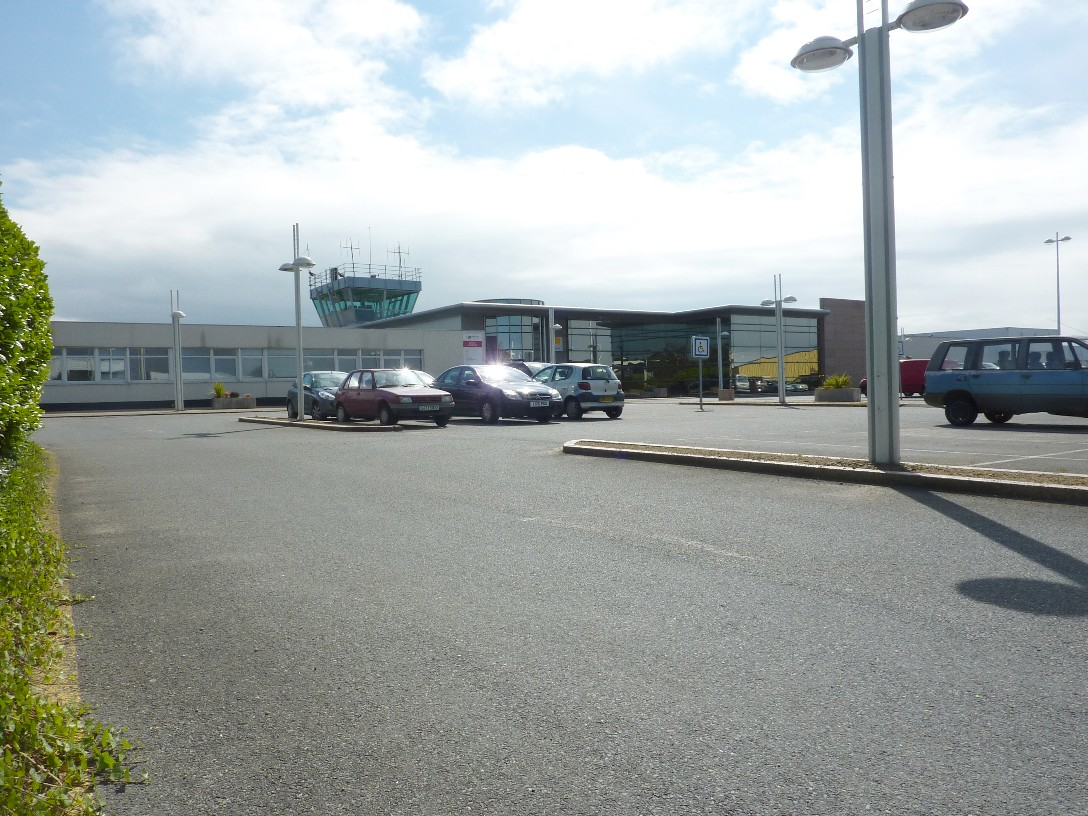
- IATA: LAI; ICAO: LFRO

Summary
- Airport type: Public
- Operator: Syndicat Intercommunal de l'Aéroport
- Serves: Lannion, France
- Location: Servel, France
- Elevation AMSL: 290 ft (88 m)
- Coordinates: 48°45′15″N 003°28′28″W
- Website: www.lannion.aeroport.fr

Map
- Location of the airport in Brittany

Runways
Direction	Length		Surface
Direction	m	ft	Surface
11/29	1,602	5,256	Asphalt
- Source: French AIP

Lannion–Côte de Granit Airport or Aéroport de Lannion–Côte de Granit (IATA: LAI, ICAO: LFRO) is an airport located in Lannion, near the former municipality of Servel, a commune of the Côtes-d'Armor département in the Brittany région of France. It was also known as Lannion Airport or Lannion–Servel Airport.

Established in 1937 for recreational aviation, Lannion Airfield began with a small landing ground. In July 1940, the Axis forces occupied the airfield and expanded it to accommodate fighter squadrons for use by the Luftwaffe. After the war, it was abandoned until it fell under use by the French Air Force, where it was used as a research test centre from 1959 through the 1960s. Lannion Airport began commercial operations in 1974 when the Rousseau Aviation Company opened a service to Paris.

== History ==
In 1937, Lannion - Servel Aerodrome was established with light and sports aviation flights. It served as an unimportant small airfield with a 695 x 640 meter large landing field.

=== World War II ===
Lannion Airfield
- Lannion, France
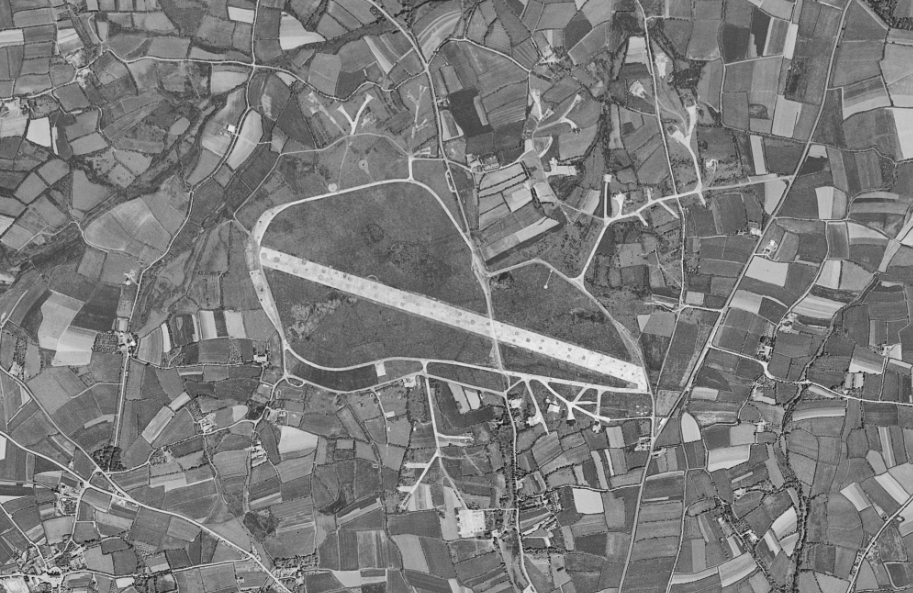
- Lannion Airfield in the 1950s, showing craters and signs of no activity.

Site information
- Type: Military airfield
- Owner: Luftwaffe
- Controlled by: Airfield Command E 73/III (1940 - Jan 1943), Airfield Command A 27/XII (Jan 1943 - Jun 1944)
- Condition: Re-developed into Lannion–Côte de Granit Airport

Location
- Coordinates: 48°45′20″N 3°28′40″W

Site history
- Built: Pre-1940
- In use: June 1940 - April 1944
- Demolished: 19, April, 1944
- Battles/wars: World War II

Airfield information
Runways
Direction	Length and surface
11/29	1370 meters concrete

Between July 1940 and June 1944, the German Luftwaffe occupied the airfield. The concrete runway was extended to 1,400 m to accommodate fighter aircraft, and subsequently experienced several raids organised by the Royal Air Force and the United States Army Air Forces.

In August 1940, twin-engined fighter unit II Z.G.76 was stationed at Lannion Airfield, which played anti-shipping reconnaissance. In June 1940, the airfield was listed as operational, and units were stationed at the airfield. However, full-scale operations did not begin until construction work to pave the airfield was completed in April 1941. The runway was installed with permanent runway illumination, a beamed approach system, and a visual Lorenz system. On 20 April 1941, 1,149 non-German workers assisted in the construction.

Shortly afterwards, low-level attacks were launched by the Royal Air Force, destroying 3 Ju-88s of the Coastal Aviation Group 606. On 19 May 1941, a German pilot named Eiermann Helmut, was killed with two other crew wounded after Anti-aircraft struck his Ju-88 aircraft. The aircraft shortly crash-landed on the airfield following the attack. From March 1941 until early September, the Gruppo 606 was stationed after re-equipped with Ju.88s. Aircraft of K.G.77 assembled at Lannion Airfield to support operations of the Bismarck. From May 26–28, 1941, German Bomber Wing Kampfgeschwader 54 moved to Lannion Airfield to support operations of the German battleship Bismarck, however, they were unable to intervene before she sank. On 10 June 1942, a reconnaissance photograph of the airfield was taken. It depicted that bomb bursts took place on the Eastern end of the runway.

==== Occasional staging use ====
After August 1942, Lannion Airfield was used for occasional staging missions, however, units were no longer based there. On 3 December 1943, a dispersal of 25 medium covered, and 6 medium open was opened. Lannion Airfield is also reported to have a compass swinging base located NW. Numerous huts for personnel and stores were installed, while hotels at Trebeurden were billeted to house aircrew. There was a medium hangar utilised for repairs, and all dispersal areas were equipped with workshops. It had 5 large covered hardstands, 25 medium covered hardstands, and 6 medium open hardstands. On 19 April 1944, the airfield was rendered unserviceable, as the landing area was plowed with trenches and craters from detonated mines.

Supplies are brought into Lannion Airfield by barge and the nearby Lannion Railway Station. Petrol was also delivered to Lannion Airfield from barges.

==== Raids ====
The following raids carried out by the United States Army Air Forces and Royal Air Force.

On August 2, 1941, 3 Westland Whirlwinds of the No. 263 Squadron RAF took off at RAF Predannack towards Lannion Airfield. They were accompanied by 10 spitfires of the No. 66 Squadron RAF, and destroyed five Ju-88 aircraft camouflaged in black.

On 20 June 1942, the airfield was bombed by 11 Douglas A-20 Boston light bombers.

On October 19, 1942, Boston III Bombers with an escort of RAF spitfires attacked Lannion Airfield during the day-time.

==== Satellite and decoy fields ====
Lannion Airfield was assigned to 4 decoy and satellite fields.

- Lannion-Saint-Michel-en-Grève

Description: Satellite or dispersal field, approximately 11 km southwest of Lannion airfield. Coordinates: 48°41′0″N 3°33′0″W

- Lannion-Kerprigent

Description: Dummy airfield, 15 km east-northeast of Lannion airfield. Coordinates: 48°46′0″N 3°16′10″W

- Lannion – Île Grande

Description: Dummy airfield, 10 km northwest of Lannion airfield. Coordinates: 48°48′5″N 3°35′0″W

- Lannion-Trégastel

Description: Decoy, equipped with decoy lights and located 6.5 km north-northwest of Lannion airfield.

==== Units and commands ====
Units and Commands that were stationed at Lannion Airfield.

Operational units

- 2nd Group of Dive Bomber Wing 2 (Jun-Dec 1940): Operated from June to December 1940.
- Bomber Group 606 (May-Oct 1941): Operated from May to October 1941.
- Reconnaissance/Support Unit 123 (Aug 1941 – Jul/Aug 1942): Active from August 1941 to July/August 1942.
- 2nd Group of Bomber Wing 1 (May 1941): Began operations in May 1941.
- 2nd Group of Bomber Wing 54 (May 1941): Active from May 1941.
- 1st Group of Bomber Wing 77 (May 1941): Started operations in May 1941.
- 3rd Reconnaissance Squadron of Reconnaissance Group 123 (Aug 1941 – Jul/Aug 1942): Operated from August 1941 to July/August 1942.
- Fernaufklärungsgruppe 123 (Long Range Reconnaissance), flew Ju-88s

Reserve training and replacement units

These units focused on training and personnel replacement.

- Replacement Chain of Bomber Group 606 (Oct 1941 – May 1942): Operated between October 1941 and May 1942.

Station commands

Units responsible for coordination within a specific airfield or station.

- Airfield Command E 73/III (1940 – Jan 1943): Operational from 1940 to January 1943.
- Airfield Command A 27/XII (Jan 1943 – Jun 1944): Operated from January 1943 to June 1944.

Station and nearby units

- Reserve Airfield Operations Company 2/XII (Oct 1940 – ?): Started in October 1940.
- 115th Airfield Operations Company (Feb 1944 – ?): Began in February 1944.
- Reserve Fortress Anti-Aircraft Battalion 323 (Jul 1940): Began operations in July 1940.
- Elements of Mixed Anti-Aircraft Battalion 292 (1941–1943): Active between 1941 and 1943.
- Elements of Light Reserve Anti-Aircraft Battalion 741 (Jun 1942): Began operations in June 1942.
- Light Reserve Anti-Aircraft Battalion 752 (Jan 1944): Started in January 1944.
- 3rd Battalion Staff of Radio Measurement Unit, Signal Regiment 54 (Perros-Guirec, 1943 – Jul 1944): Stationed in Perros-Guirec from 1943 to July 1944.
- 8th Special Radio Intelligence Platoon 10 (Perros-Guirec, 1943 – Jul 1944): Stationed in Perros-Guirec from 1943 to July 1944.
- Special Radio Intelligence Platoon 14 (Perros-Guirec, 1943 – Jul 1944): Stationed in Perros-Guirec from 1943 to July 1944.
- Special Radio Intelligence Platoon 62 (Perros-Guirec, 1943 – Jul 1944): Stationed in Perros-Guirec from 1943 to July 1944.

== Post-war ==
After the war, the airfield was transferred to the French Air Force. In April 1959, the National Center for Telecommunications Studies (CNET) set up a first department near the airfield runway. A flight test center, the CNET “research center”, was inaugurated on October 28, 1963. In 1964, creation of a special connection reserved for CNET personnel with the Villacoublay military airfield until December 2001 (25,000 passengers per year on average). In 1974, the Rousseau Aviation company opened the first commercial line to Paris via Dinard in Hawker Siddley 748. The company was then absorbed by TAT, which continued operations and was itself sold in 1997 to Air Freedom.

=== 1976–2016 ===
In 1976–1977, the direct line to Paris was provided by TAT8 in VFW-614. The latter company complained about unfair competition from the CNET plane on its route to Paris. In 1989, the track was increased to 1,700 m. Connections to Paris were made by Fairchild F-27 aircraft from TAT European Airlines, and on certain connections via Saint-Brieuc–Armor Airport. In 1994, a new terminal was created; in 2001, it was expanded with new offices. In 1997, Air Liberté operated the line to Paris (until 2003). High-intensity marking was installed. In 2000, 85,000 passengers passed through the platform. In 2001, Air Liberté was liquidated and the line was taken over by Air Lib. In December, the CNET line stopped permanently.

In 2003, Air Lib was liquidated in turn. Brit Air took over the line, chartering planes from Airlinair until 2009. In 2005, the airport saw 52,000 passengers. That same year, a project was proposed to extend the runway by 360 meters to accommodate larger planes, with the goal of developing the airport through low-cost flights. However, the project was not fully implemented until 2006, when it was completed and reinforced. In 2009, a public service delegation was created. After a call for tenders, Airlinair was chosen to operate the line on its own account at the expense of Brit Air. The joint association gave itself one year to demonstrate the economic interest of the site. 34,000 passengers used the platform. In 2012, Airlinair denounced the public service agreement. The financiers accepted an “extension” of €700,000 to maintain the line until September 22, 2013. In September 2016, the airport lost its status as a border post (disappearance of the Customs post), penalizing tourist flights coming from England or the Channel Islands. From now on, Saint-Brieuc Customs will operate this border post on request.

== Airlines and destinations ==
As of November 2018, there are no regular passenger flights at Lannion after Chalair Aviation pulled their seasonal services as the sole operator.
