= Limoges–Bellegarde Airport =

Limoges–Bellegarde Airport Aéroport de Limoges-Bellegarde
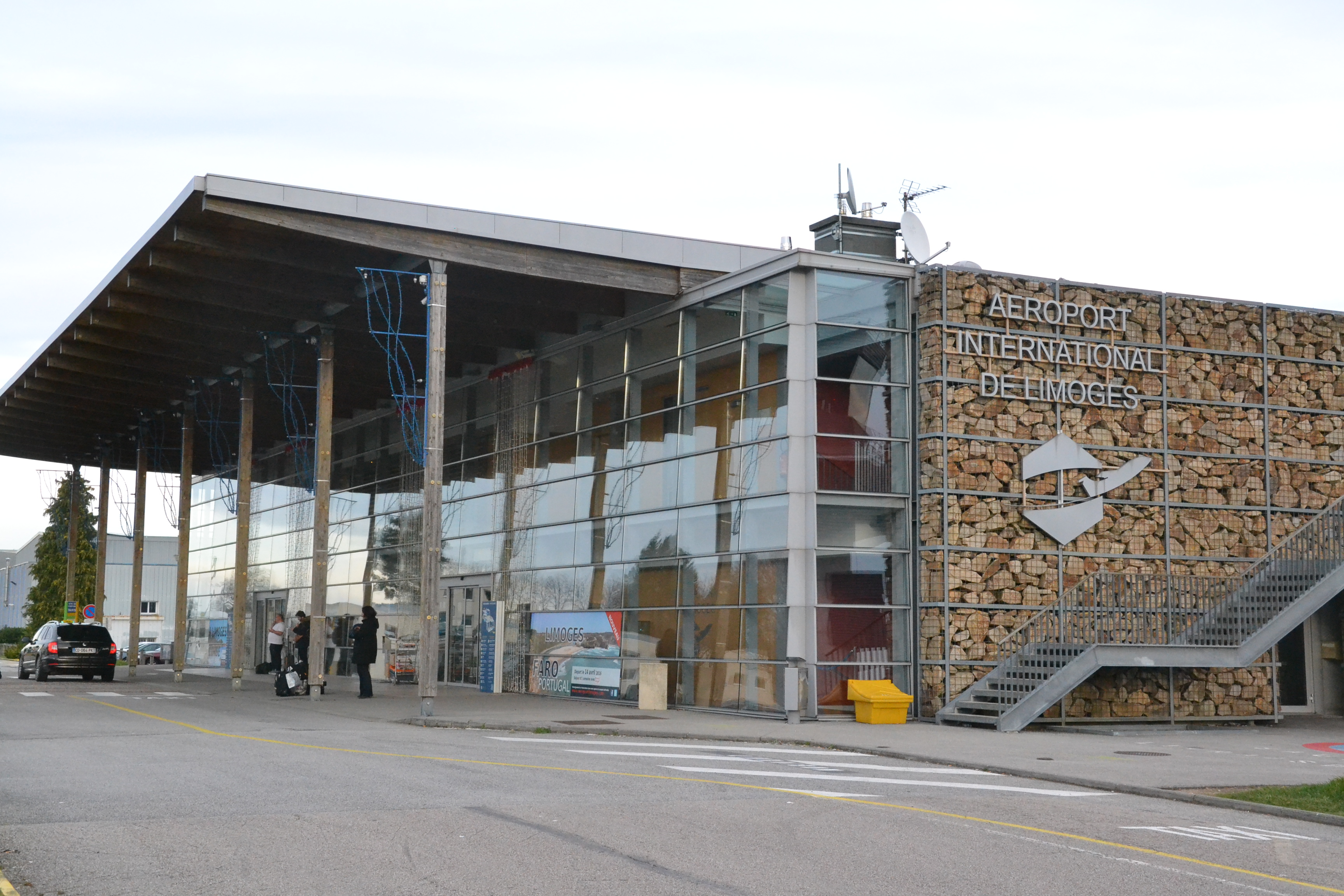
- IATA: LIG; ICAO: LFBL

Summary
- Airport type: Public
- Operator: CCI de Limoges
- Serves: Limoges, France
- Location: Bellegarde
- Elevation AMSL: 1,300 ft (400 m)
- Coordinates: 45°51′39″N 001°10′49″E
- Website: www.AeroportLimoges.com

Map
- Location in Nouvelle-Aquitaine region LFBL (France)

Runways
Direction	Length		Surface
Direction	m	ft	Surface
03/21	2,440	8,005	Asphalt
03R/21L	800	2,625	Grass

Statistics (2014)
- Passengers: 290,792
- Passenger Change 13-14: ▼3.0%
- Source: French AIP

Limoges–Bellegarde Airport (French: Aéroport de Limoges-Bellegarde, IATA: LIG, ICAO: LFBL) is an airport located 6 kilometres (4 mi) west-northwest of Limoges, a commune of the Haute-Vienne department in the Nouvelle-Aquitaine region of France. The airport presently has limited mass transit options which include only three stops per day of bus line 26 and a shared taxi service to and from the main train station.

== Facilities ==
The airport is at an elevation of 1,300 feet (396 m) above mean sea level. It has one paved runway designated 03/21 which measures 2,440 by 45 metres (8,005 ft × 148 ft). It also has a parallel grass runway measuring 800 by 80 metres (2,625 ft × 262 ft).

== Airlines and destinations ==
The following airlines operate regular scheduled and charter flights at Limoges – Bellegarde Airport:

Airlines	Destinations
Chalair Aviation	Lyon
Ryanair	London–Stansted, Manchester, Marrakesh; Seasonal: Bristol, East Midlands, Leeds/Bradford
Volotea	Paris–Orly; Seasonal: Ajaccio, Marseille, Barcelona, Malaga, Minorca, Palma de Mallorca, Rome–Fiumicino

The nearest larger international airport is Bordeaux–Mérignac Airport, located 240 km (150 mi) south west of Limoges–Bellegarde Airport.
