= Saint-Étienne–Bouthéon Airport =

Saint-Étienne–Loire-Airport Aéroport de Saint-Étienne – Bouthéon
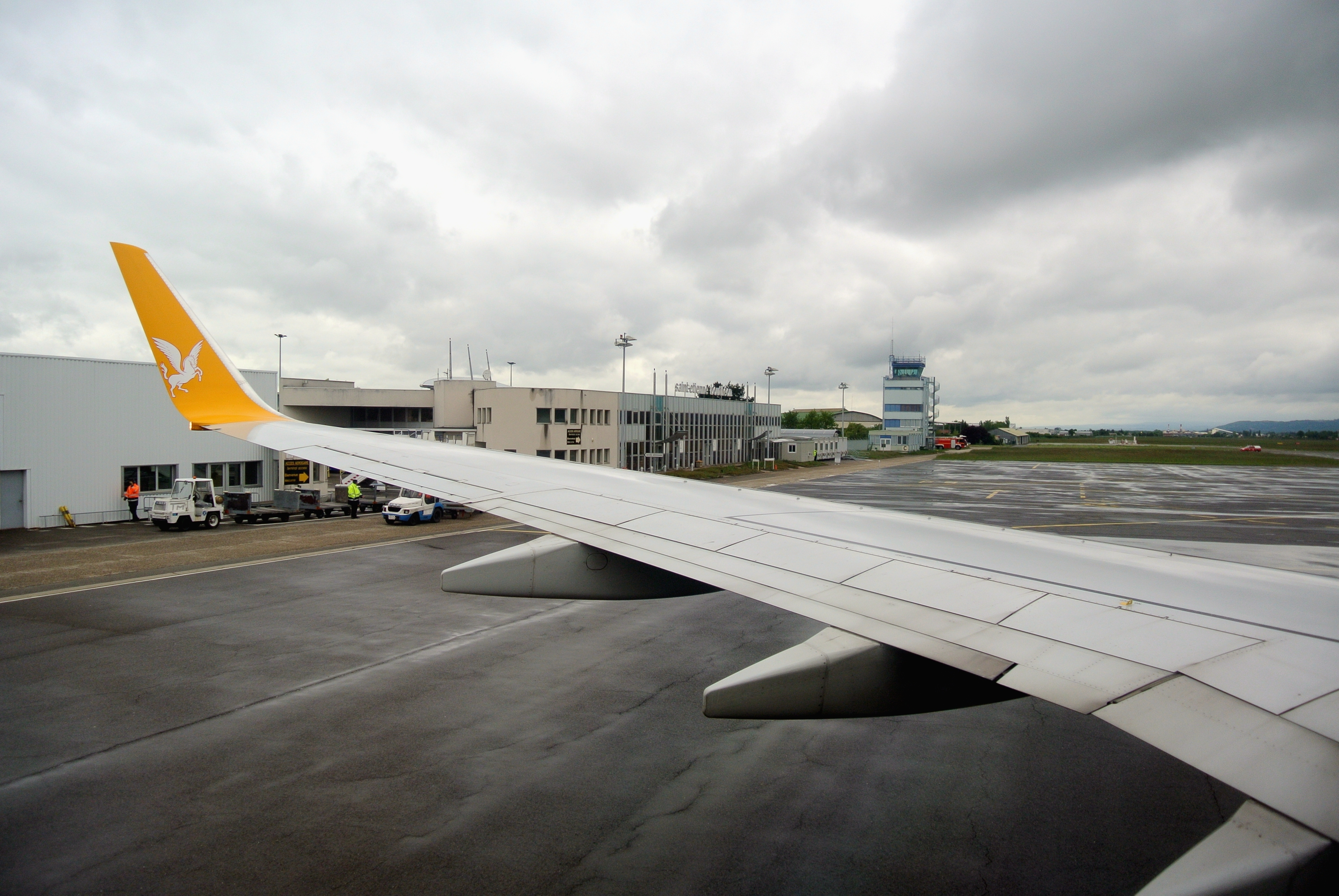
- IATA: EBU; ICAO: LFMH

Summary
- Airport type: Public
- Serves: Saint-Étienne, France
- Location: Andrézieux-Bouthéon
- Elevation AMSL: 1,325 ft / 404 m
- Coordinates: 45°32′26″N 004°17′47″E
- Website: saint-etienne.aeroport.fr

Map
- Location of airport in Auvergne-Rhône-Alpes region

Runways
Direction	Length		Surface
Direction	m	ft	Surface
18/36	2,300	7,546	Asphalt
- Source: French AIP

Saint-Étienne–Loire-Airport or Aéroport de Saint-Étienne–Loire (IATA: EBU, ICAO: LFMH) is an international airport serving the French city of Saint-Étienne. It is located in Andrézieux-Bouthéon, 12 km north-northwest of Saint-Étienne, within the département of Loire in the Auvergne-Rhône-Alpes région and mainly used by low-cost airlines.

== History ==
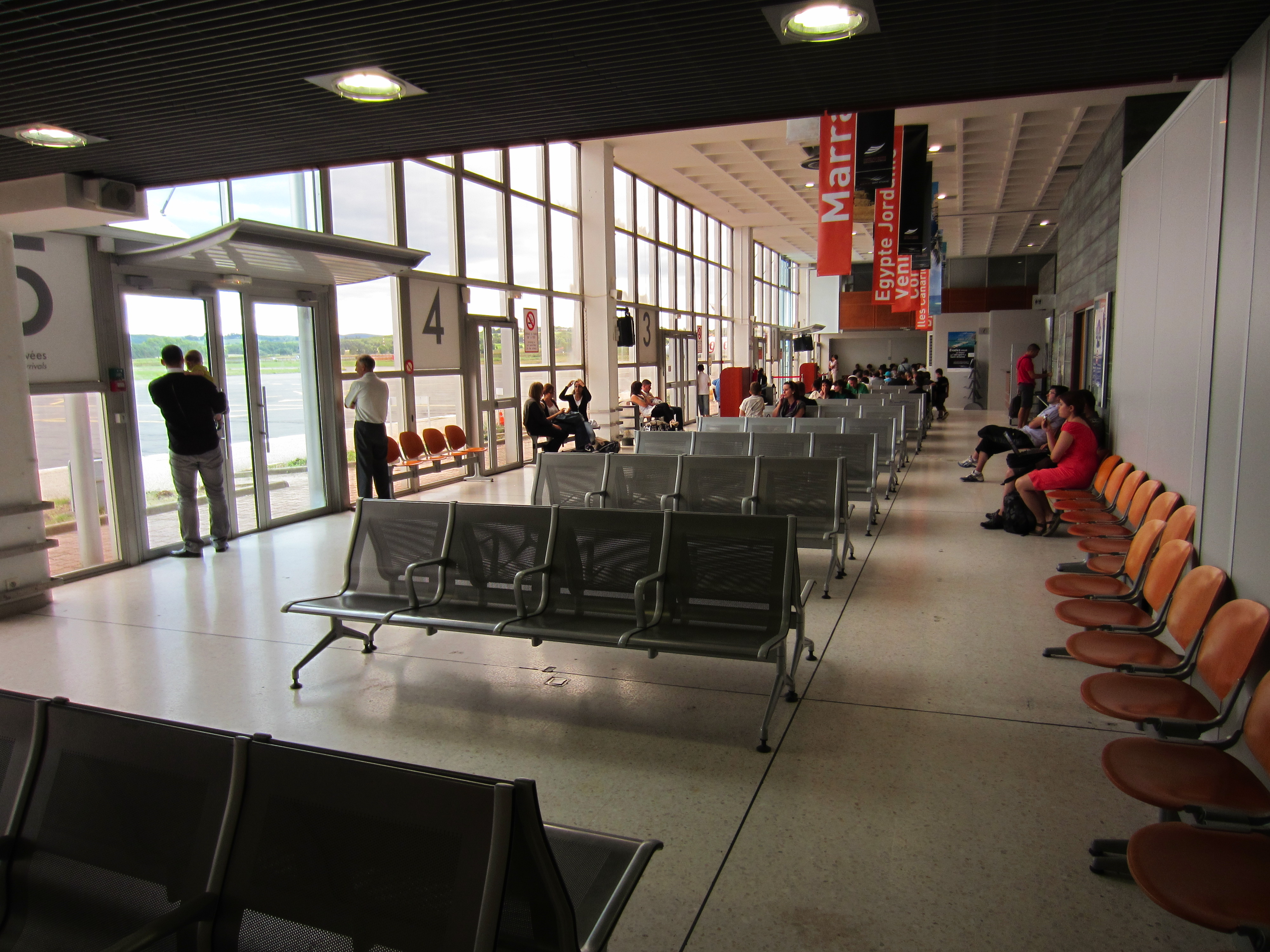
The first entrance of the airport.

In February 2017, the airport decided to cancel all subsidies towards low cost carriers serving the airport which led to Ryanair and Pegasus Airlines cancelling all services to Saint-Étienne by 2018. Consequently, there were no scheduled services to and from the airport for several years, apart from occasional holiday charters, mainly to Mediterranean destinations. At the time, passengers were reallocated to Lyon–Saint-Exupéry Airport which is located 77 km (48 mi) to the north east of Saint-Étienne–Bouthéon Airport. In 2025, ASL Airlines France commenced flights to Bejaia during the summer holidays.

== Airlines and destinations ==
Airlines	Destinations
ASL Airlines France	Seasonal: Bejaia
