= Bora Bora Airport =

Airport in French Polynesia

Bora Bora Airport Aéroport de Bora Bora
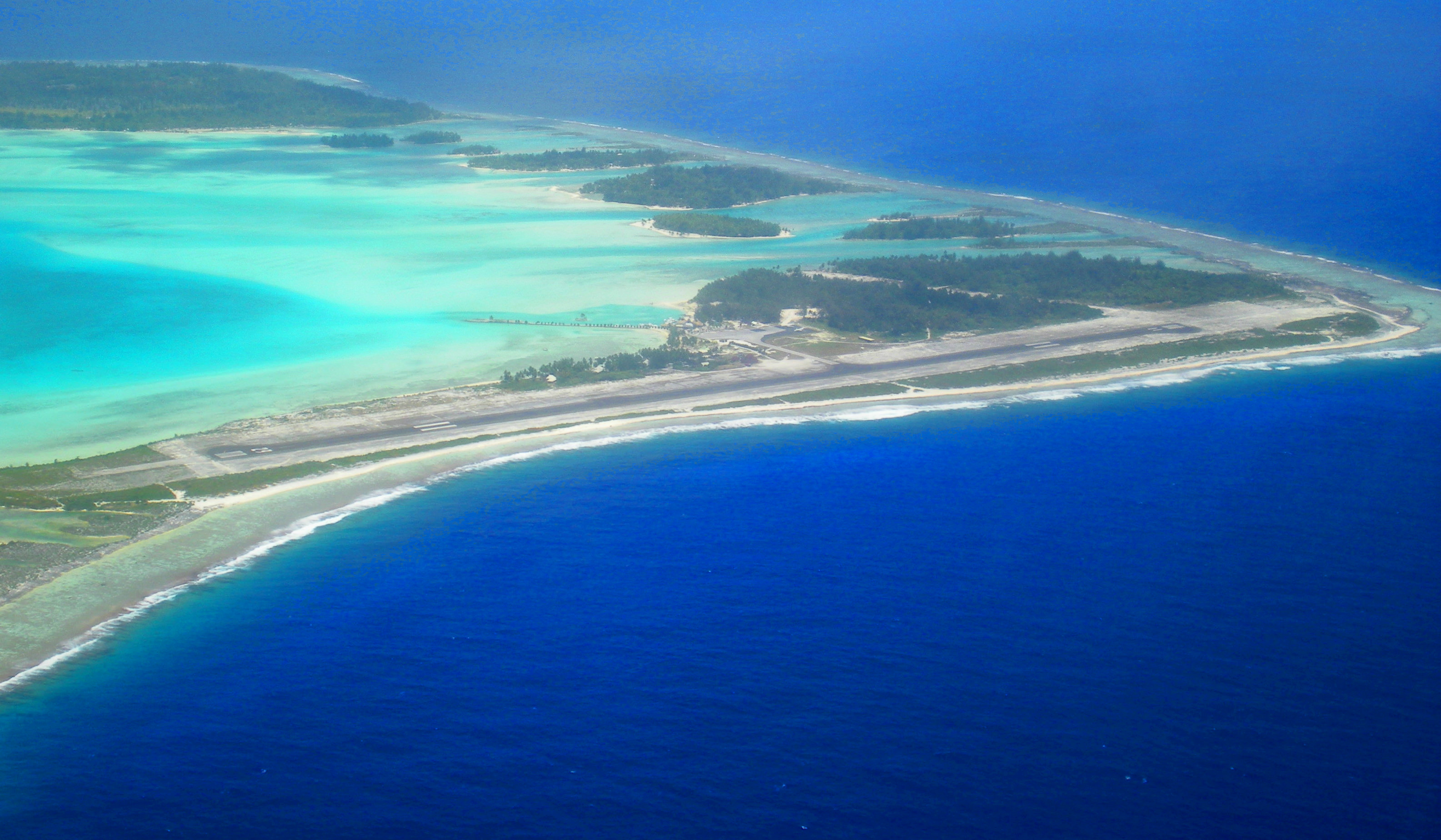
- View of Bora Bora Airport
- IATA: BOB; ICAO: NTTB

Summary
- Airport type: Public
- Operator: SETIL - Aéroports
- Serves: Bora Bora, French Polynesia, France
- Location: Motu Mute
- Elevation AMSL: 11 ft / 3 m
- Coordinates: 16°26′37″S 151°45′09″W

Map
- Location of the airport in French Polynesia

Runways
Direction	Length		Surface
Direction	m	ft	Surface
11/29	1,505	4,938	Asphalt

Statistics (2023)
- Passengers: 384,564
- Passenger traffic change: ▲19.8%
- Aircraft movements: 10,710
- Aircraft movements change: ▲34.3%
- Data: French AIP, Aeroport.fr

Bora Bora Airport (IATA: BOB, ICAO: NTTB), also known as Motu Mute Airport, is an airport serving the island of Bora Bora in French Polynesia. It is located on the islet of Motu Mute.

The airport was opened in 1943, during World War II. Commercial service became available in 1958 after the runway was reconstructed. It is built on an island (the Polynesian word for which is "motu") located in a lagoon. A boat transfer is necessary to get to the main island of Bora Bora.

Passengers from Vaitape, the largest population center on Bora Bora, usually use this airport for air travel.

== Airlines and destinations ==
Airlines	Destinations
Air Moana	Fakarava, Huahine-Fare, Moorea, Papeete, Rangiroa
Air Tahiti	Huahine-Fare, Manihi, Maupiti, Moorea, Papeete, Raiatea, Rangiroa, Tikehau

Although the airport does not have scheduled passenger airline jet service, larger business jet types such as the Bombardier Global Express, Gulfstream V, and Dassault Falcon 900 have used the airfield.

== Historical airline service ==
Prior to the opening of the Faa'a International Airport (PPT) in Papeete, Tahiti in 1960, Bora Bora was served by French air carrier Transports Aériens Intercontinentaux (TAI) with Douglas DC-7C propliner service direct to Los Angeles (LAX) via a stop in Honolulu (HNL) and also direct to Nouméa via a stop in Nandi (NAN, now Nadi) with both flights operating once a week. With the opening of the Papeete Airport, TAI then began flying DC-7C service followed by Douglas DC-8 jet service directly into Papeete, Tahiti with connecting flights between Bora Bora and Papeete being operated by regional French Polynesian air carrier Reseau Aerien Interinsulaire (RAI) with Douglas DC-4 propliners and Short Sandringham "Bermuda" flying boats during the early 1960s.

RAI was then renamed Air Polynésie which continued to operate Douglas DC-4 service into Bora Bora in 1970 before introducing Fokker F27 turboprops on flights to Papeete by the mid-1970s. Air Polynésie also served Bora Bora with de Havilland Canada DHC-6 Twin Otter commuter turboprops. Air Polynésie was in turn renamed Air Tahiti in 1986 and this air carrier continues to serve Bora Bora at the present time with ATR 42 and ATR 72 turboprops.

== Gallery ==
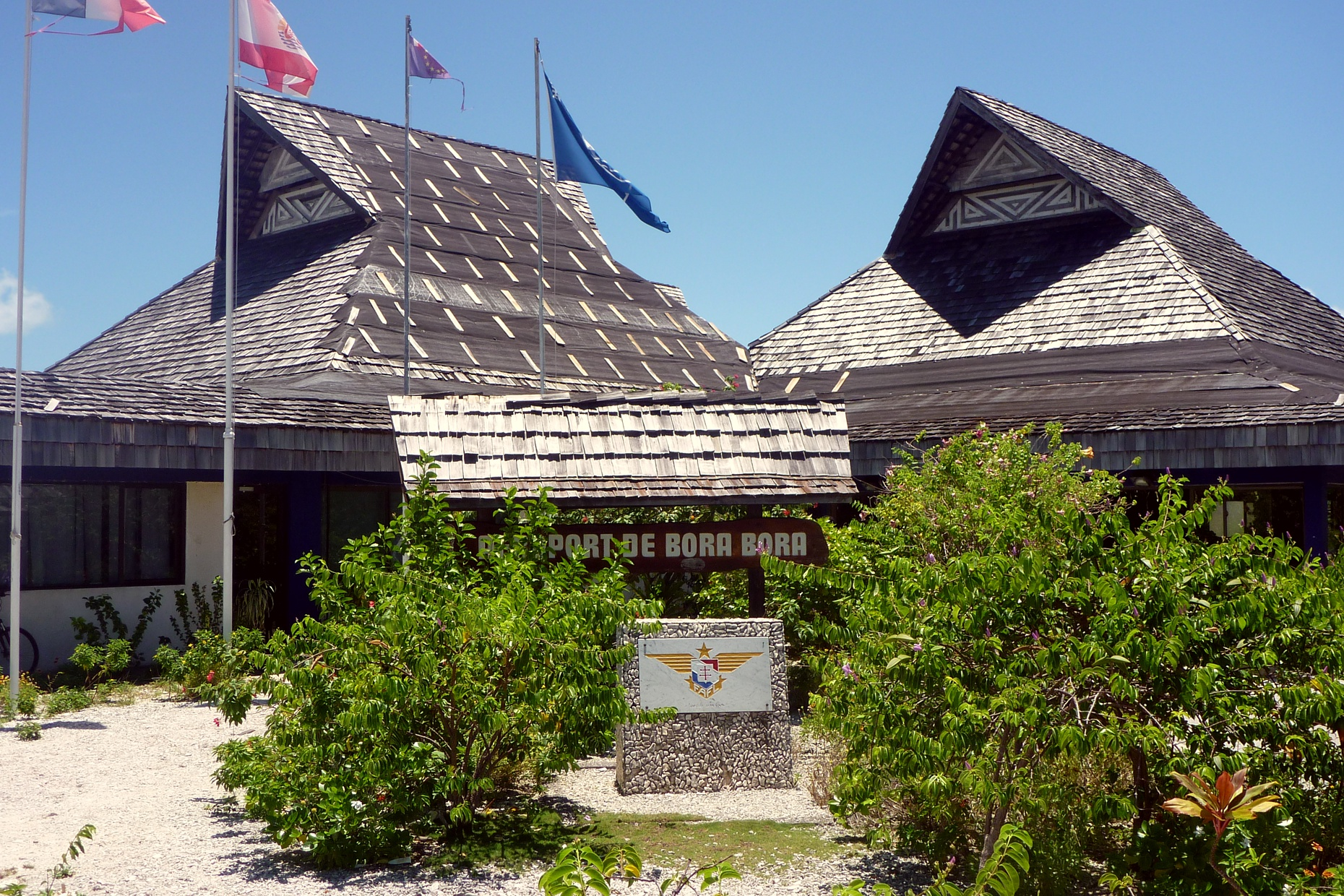
Terminal entrance

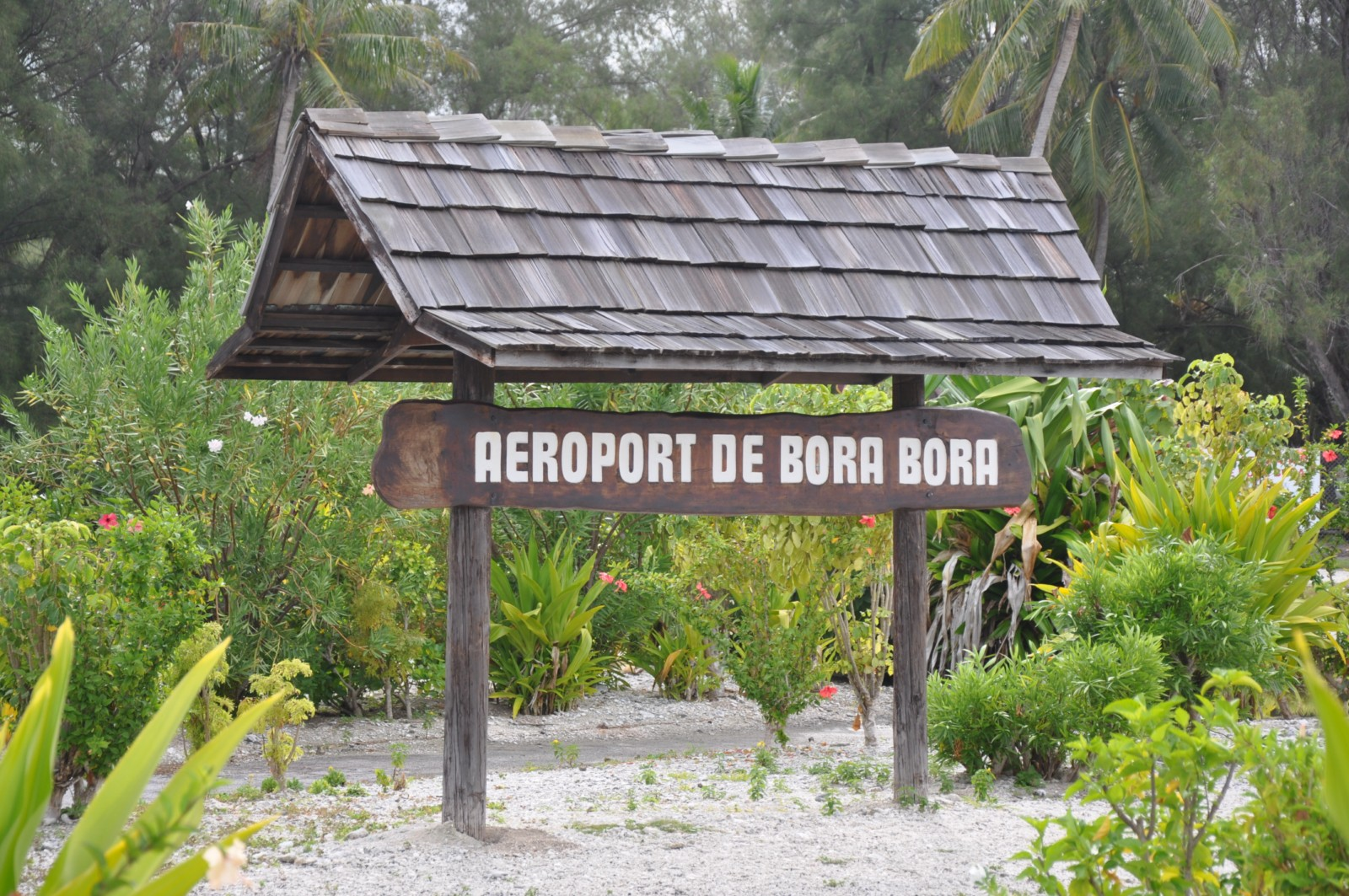
Airport signage

== See also ==
- List of airports in French Polynesia
