= Caen–Carpiquet Airport =

Caen–Carpiquet Airport Aéroport de Caen–Carpiquet
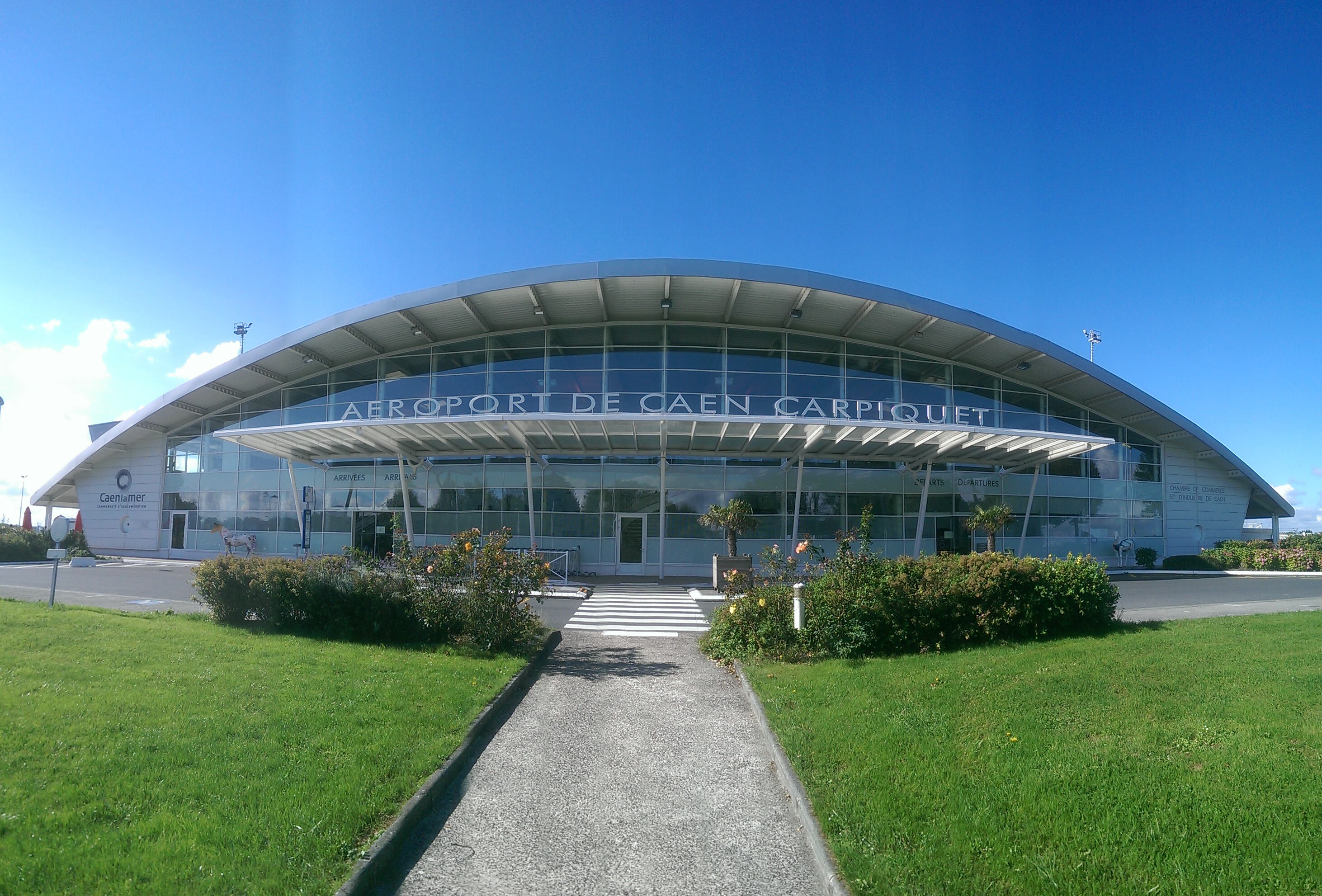
- IATA: CFR; ICAO: LFRK

Summary
- Airport type: Public
- Operator: CCI de Caen
- Serves: Caen, France
- Location: Carpiquet, France
- Opened: 1938
- Elevation AMSL: 256 ft (78 m)
- Coordinates: 49°10′24″N 000°27′00″W
- Website: caen.aeroport.fr

Map
- Location of the airport in Lower Normandy LFRK (France)

Runways
Direction	Length		Surface
Direction	m	ft	Surface
13/31	1,900	6,233	Asphalt
- Source: French AIP

Caen–Carpiquet Airport (French: Aéroport de Caen–Carpiquet) (IATA: CFR, ICAO: LFRK) is an international airport located in Carpiquet, 6 km west of Caen, both communes of the Calvados département in the Normandy (formerly Lower Normandy) region of France. Chalair Aviation has its head offices at the airport. In 2017, Caen–Carpiquet Airport handled 180,910 passengers, an increase of 30.1% over 2016. In 2018, it handled 274,011 passengers, a 51.5% increase over 2017.

== History ==
=== The military base (1939-1967) ===
The idea of an airfield near Caen dated back to 1926 after a visit from a military delegation. However, it was only in 1930 that the Ministry of Aviation approved its creation. Work started in July 1937 and ended in March 1938.

Air base 720 Caen-Carpiquet was inaugurated on 17 August 1939. Captured by the Luftwaffe in June 1940, it served as a rear base during the Battle of Britain. While under German control the runway was extended and concreted.

In June and July 1944, during the Battle of Normandy, Anglo-Canadian and German troops engaged in long and harsh fights over control of the strategically important aerodrome. Following the war, the airfield was rebuilt and refitted for the French Air Force.

=== Civil airport (since 1967) ===
The 16 May 1969 decree placed the aerodrome under the civil aviation general secretariat, a branch of the transport ministry. In the late 1960s, Caen City Council further developed the aerodrome for civilian use under the Chamber of Commerce and Industry's management.

In May 1968, a terminal building was built, housing a public concourse, service offices, and a restaurant.

Since March 2007, the airport has been managed by the Urban community of Caen la Mer

By late 2008, a regularly scheduled Caen–Paris-Orly route was introduced with two round trips per week. This was the second scheduled route after Caen–Lyon. In 2010, the frequency of the Caen–Paris-Orly route was increased to three round trips per week, and then further increased to Mondays, Tuesdays, Thursdays, and Fridays. In 2014, the low-cost company Flybe opened a route between Caen and London Southend Airport. The Caen–Paris-Orly route was also discontinued on the decision of the route operator Hop.

Between July and August, the 13/31 runway was rebuilt, as well as the taxiway which was also enlarged. By 2020, the main 1900 meters long runway is expected to be extended to an eventual length of between 2250 and 2400 meters long.

A regularly scheduled route Caen–Geneva was expected to start on 26 November 2018, a seasonal route Caen–Pau was expected to start in December 2018 and a seasonal route Caen–Palma de Mallorca was expected to start in April 2019.

The London–Caen route was discontinued in early 2020, when the airline Flybe became defunct.

== Facilities ==
Caen airport has a concrete runway (13/31) and two grass runways for recreational aviation.

The 1,900-metre (2,078 yd) long main runway (13/31) is equipped with high intensity approach lighting. Runway 31 is equipped with a Category III instrument landing system.

== Airlines and destinations ==
The following airlines operate regular scheduled and charter flights at Caen–Carpiquet Airport:

Airlines	Destinations
Air France	Lyon; Seasonal: Ajaccio, Biarritz, Calvi (begins 4 July 2026), Figari, Marseille, Nice
Chalair Aviation	Seasonal: Kerry
Volotea	Marseille, Montpellier, Nice, Toulouse; Seasonal: Ajaccio, Bastia, Figari

== Traffic ==
Year	Passengers
2021	227,168
2020	162,426
2019	304,769
2018	274,011
2017	180,910
2016	139,016
2015	129,096
2014	115,015
2013	105,022
2012	100,769
2011	107,898
2010	76,883
2009	89,868
2008	107,898

== Access ==
The airport is located west of Caen, on Carpiquet commune. Since 29 June 2015, it has been served by Twisto bus line 3.
