= Deauville–Normandie Airport =

Airport in France

Deauville–Normandie Airport Aéroport de Deauville–Normandie
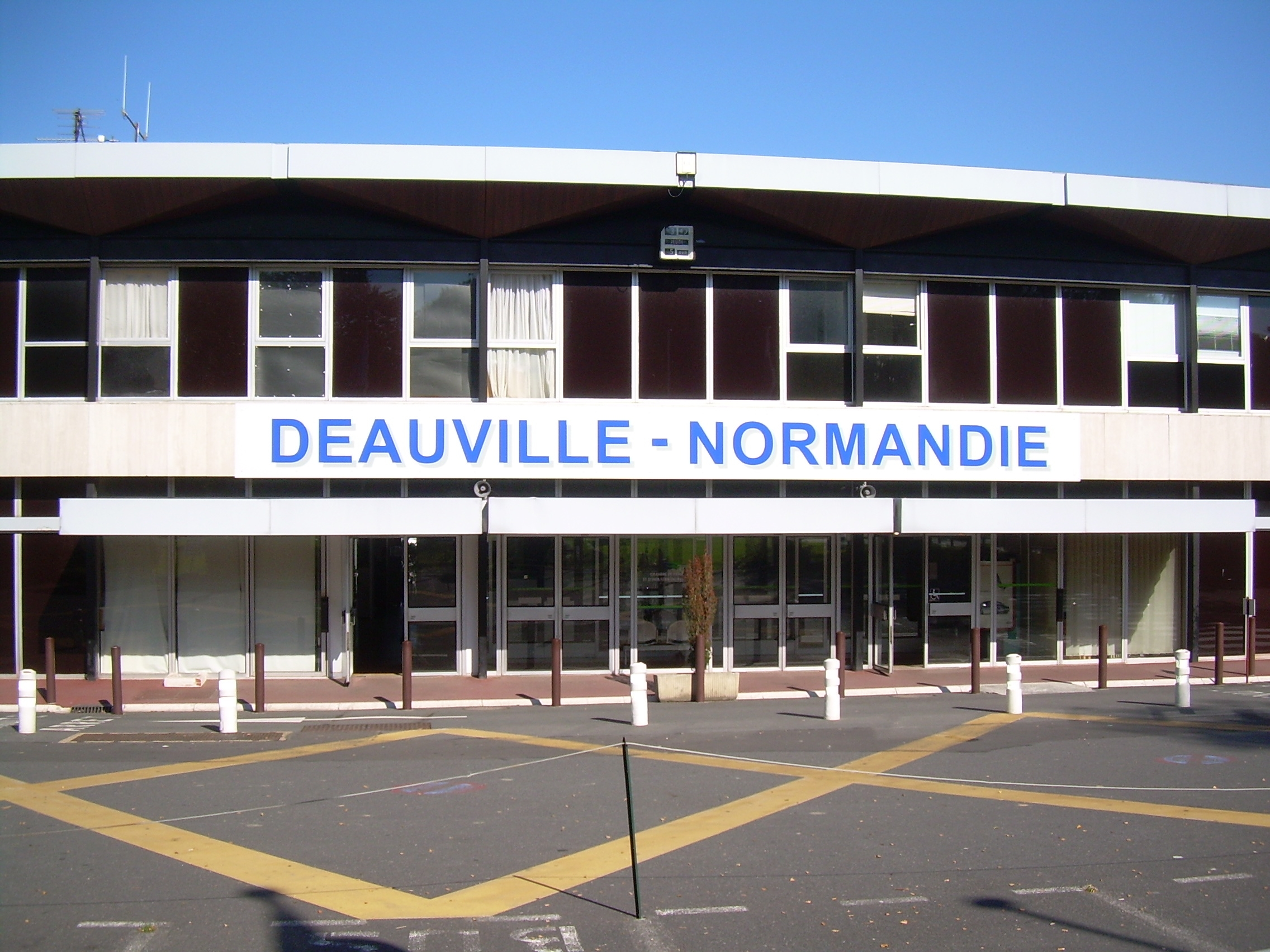
- IATA: DOL; ICAO: LFRG

Summary
- Airport type: Public
- Serves: Deauville, France
- Elevation AMSL: 479 ft / 146 m
- Coordinates: 49°21′55″N 00°09′15″E

Map
- Location of the airport in Lower Normandy LFRG (France)

Runways
Direction	Length		Surface
Direction	m	ft	Surface
12/30	2,550	8,366	Asphalt
- Source: French AIP

Deauville–Normandie Airport (French: Aéroport de Deauville–Normandie) (IATA: DOL, ICAO: LFRG), previously known as Deauville–Saint-Gatien Airport (French: Aéroport de Deauville–Saint-Gatien), is a small international airport situated 7 kilometres (4.3 miles) east of Deauville, a commune of the Calvados department in the Normandy region of France. In 2017, the airport handled 163,626 passengers, an increase of 17% over 2016.

== Airlines and destinations ==
The following airlines operate regular scheduled and charter flights to and from Deauville:

Airlines	Destinations
Aegean Airlines	Seasonal: Heraklion
Transavia	Seasonal: Marrakesh
Volotea	Seasonal: Olbia, Palma de Mallorca; Seasonal charter: Palermo
