= Ajaccio Napoleon Bonaparte Airport =

Airport serving Ajaccio, Corsica, France

Napoleon Bonaparte Airport Aéroport d'Ajaccio-Napoléon-Bonaparte Aeruportu di Aiacciu Nabulione Buonaparte
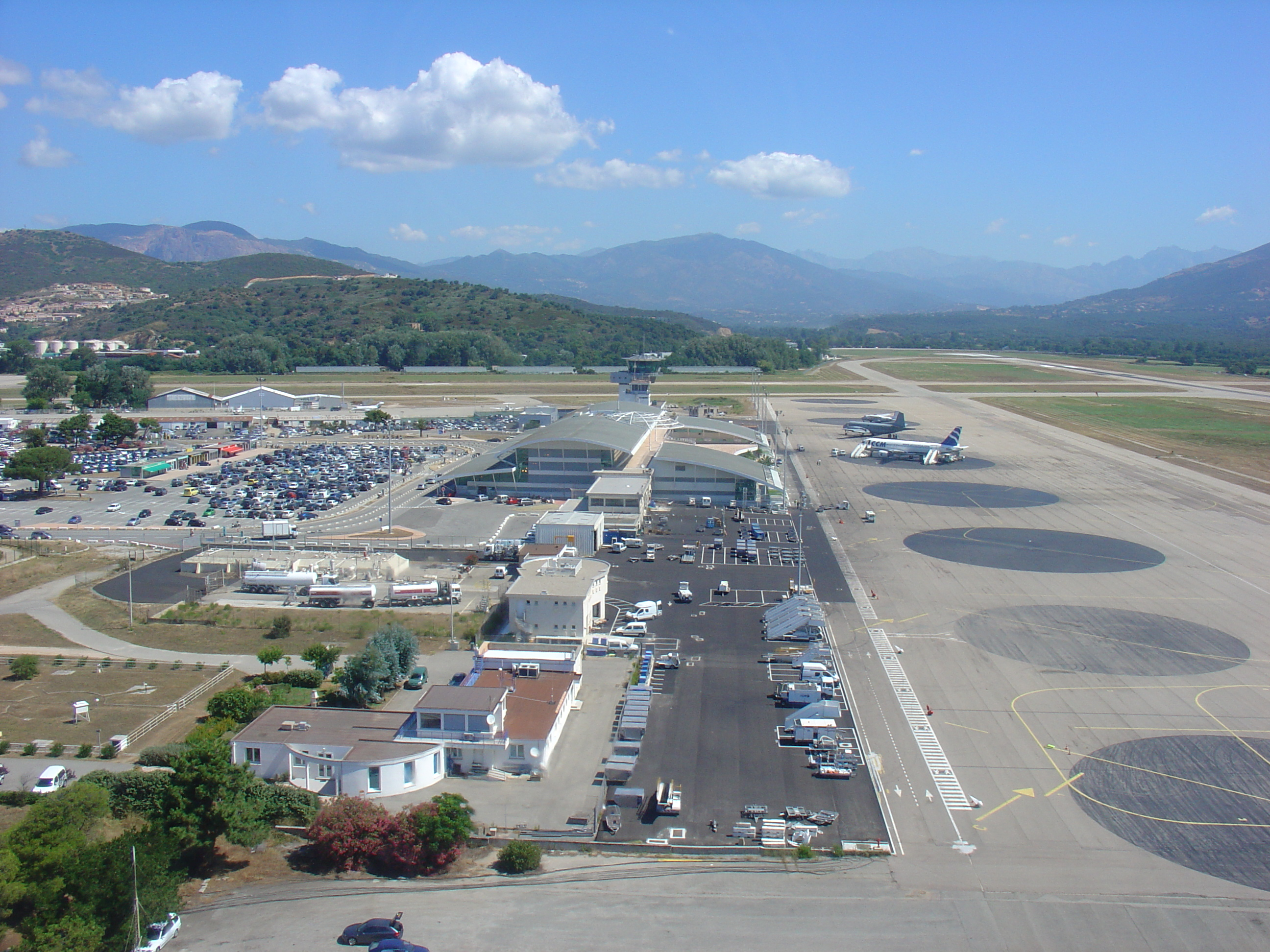
- IATA: AJA; ICAO: LFKJ

Summary
- Airport type: Public
- Operator: CCI d'Ajaccio/Corse du Sud
- Serves: Ajaccio, France
- Elevation AMSL: 17 ft (5.2 m)
- Coordinates: 41°55′26″N 008°48′09″E
- Website: http://www.aeroport.fr

Map
- Location of the airport in Corsica LFKJ (France)

Runways
Direction	Length		Surface
Direction	m	ft	Surface
02/20	2,407	7,897	Bituminous concrete

Statistics (2021)
- Passengers: 1,411,728
- Freight (metric tons): 6.087
- Movements: 31,590
- Source: French AIP, Aeroport.fr

Ajaccio Napoleon Bonaparte Airport (Note: French: Aéroport d'Ajaccio-Napoléon-Bonaparte, Corsican: Aeruportu di Aiacciu Nabulione Buonaparte) (IATA: AJA, ICAO: LFKJ), formerly "Campo dell'Oro Airport", is the main airport serving Ajaccio on the French island of Corsica in the Mediterranean Sea. It is located 5 km (3.1 mi; 2.7 nmi) east of Ajaccio, the capital and main city on Corsica. The airport is the main base of regional airline Air Corsica, which operates services to continental France. It is named after Napoleon Bonaparte, who was born in Ajaccio.

== History ==
Campo dell'Oro, before aviation, was an alluvial plain at the mouth of the Gravona river. The toponym's origin, meaning "Field of Gold", remains obscure; some 19th century authors refer to a "rich cropland"; others, to a malaria-infested marshland. A grass flying field existed there before World War II but apparently offered no transportation services, as the first regular flights to Marseille began with the institution of a seaplane service in 1935 from Ajaccio Harbor.

In 1940, a Vichy Air Corps unit was kept inactive at Campo dell'Oro. The liberation of Corsica began with the landing by sea in 1943 of the French 1st Army Corps at Ajaccio in Operation Vésuve. A few months later Fighter Group GC 2/7 of the Free French Air Force, a French unit of the Royal Air Force, were operational on the grass field at Campo dell'Oro with Spitfires. Heavy aircraft were unable to land and came to mishap in the soft surface.

In 1944 the United States Army Air Forces took over the airfield and put down a hard surface of perforated metallic mats from which a squadron of North American P-51 Mustang fighters flew. They defended Martin B-26 Marauder bombers flying from new airfields constructed on the east coast of Corsica. Campo dell'Oro was a challenge for the larger aircraft because of its relatively short runways and proximity to the mountains. Toward the end of the war, the runways were paved, forming the foundation of the modern airport.

On 16 April 1981, President Valéry Giscard d'Estaing was the target of an attempted assassination at the airport grounds by the National Liberation Front of Corsica.

Before the crash of Inex-Adria Aviopromet Flight 1308, the airport had no radar, and its holding pattern had aircraft fly over mountains. After the crash, the holding pattern was shifted over the ocean and aircraft radar was installed.

== Airlines and destinations ==
The following airlines operate regular scheduled and charter flights at Ajaccio Napoleon Bonaparte Airport:

Airlines	Destinations
Air Corsica	Lyon, Marseille, Nice, Paris–Orly, Toulouse; Seasonal: Charleroi, Clermont-Ferrand, Dole, Munich, Rome–Fiumicino, Rennes, Toulon, Venice, Zurich
Air France	Paris–Orly; Seasonal: Brive, Caen, Castres, Lyon, Nantes, Paris–Charles de Gaulle, Poitiers
Amelia International	Seasonal: Brive
Chalair Aviation	Seasonal: Brive
easyJet	Seasonal: Basel/Mulhouse, Bordeaux, Geneva, Lyon, Nantes, Paris–Charles de Gaulle
Luxair	Seasonal: Luxembourg
Norwegian Air Shuttle	Seasonal: Oslo
Transavia	Seasonal: Lyon, Nantes, Rennes
Volotea	Seasonal: Bordeaux, Brest, Caen, Lille, Lyon, Montpellier, Nantes, Rodez, Strasbourg, Toulouse

== Other facilities ==
Air Corsica has its head office on the airport property.

== Incidents and accidents ==
- On 1 December 1981, Inex-Adria Aviopromet Flight 1308 crashed while on approach to this airport, killing all 180 on board.
