= Montpellier–Méditerranée Airport =

Montpellier–Méditerranée Airport Aéroport de Montpellier–Méditerranée
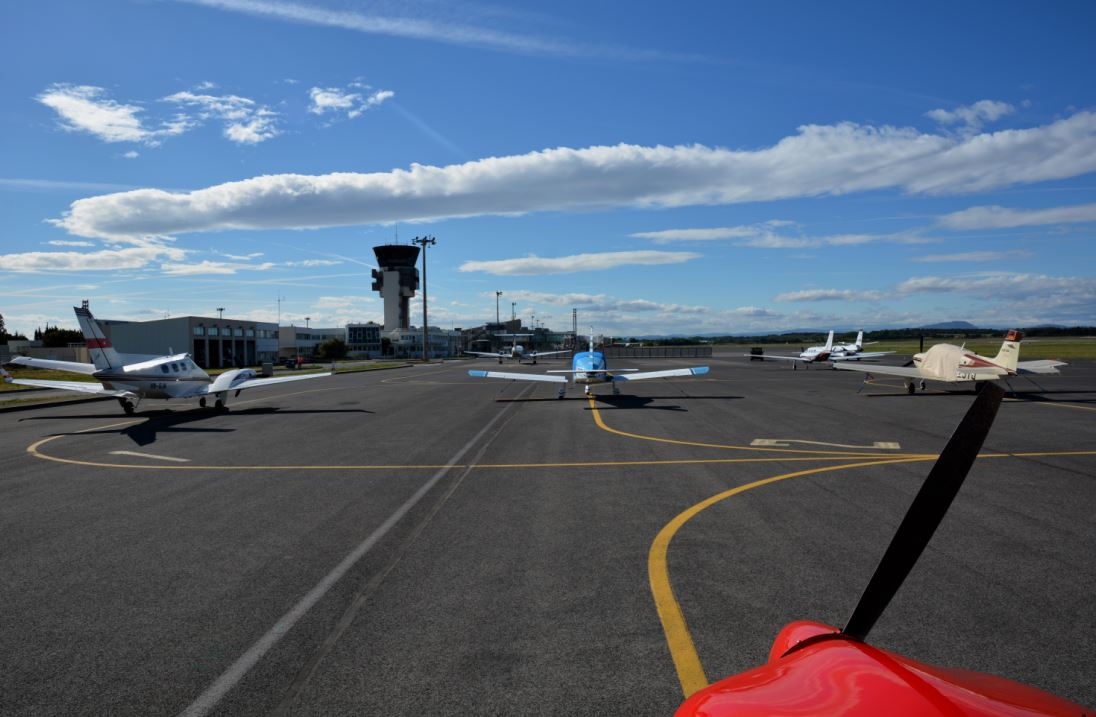
- IATA: MPL; ICAO: LFMT

Summary
- Airport type: Public
- Operator: S.A Aéroport de Montpellier Méditerranée
- Serves: Montpellier
- Location: Mauguio, France
- Focus city for: Transavia France
- Elevation AMSL: 17 ft (5.2 m)
- Coordinates: 43°34′35″N 003°57′47″E
- Website: montpellier.aeroport.fr

Map
- Location of airport in Occitanie region in France LFMT (France)

Runways
Direction	Length		Surface
Direction	m	ft	Surface
12L/30R	2,600	8,530	Asphalt
12R/30L	1,100	3,609	Asphalt

Statistics (2019)
- Passengers: 1,935,631
- Passenger traffic change: ▲2.96%
- Source: French AIP, Aeroport.fr

Montpellier–Méditerranée Airport or Aéroport de Montpellier–Méditerranée (IATA: MPL, ICAO: LFMT), also known as Fréjorgues Airport, is an international airport in southern France. It is located 7 km (4 nautical miles) east-southeast of Montpellier in Mauguio, in the Hérault department of the Occitania (administrative region) in France. The airport opened in 1946, 8 years after the first flight to the area.

A campus of the École nationale de l'aviation civile (French civil aviation university) is also located at the airport.

== History ==
=== The Beginnings ===
In 1938, the first aircraft landed at FréjorguesDuring 1944, the airport was used by the Luftwaffe and subsequently bombed by the 15th USAAF on 27 January. It faced another bombing on Saturday, 27 May 1944 c,arried out by four bomber groups of the 304th Bomber Wing.

=== The post-war period ===
In 1946, significant improvements were made to facilitate the opening of the civil terminal. By 1964, the Montpellier Chamber of Commerce and Industry (CCIM) had obtained the temporary commercial management of the airport.

=== From the 1970s onwards ===
In 1974, the Montpellier Chamber of Commerce and Industry (CCIM) secured a commercial operating permit for a duration of 30 years.

=== From the 1990s onwards ===
In 1990, the airport's passenger numbers reached the one million mark. The inauguration of the new terminal building, covering an area of 14,000 m2, provided enhanced facilities for the passengers. Access to aircraft is provided by three passenger jet bridges and two mobile pre-bridges. On 1 February 1994, Montpellier-Fréjorgues airport officially became Montpellier-Méditerranée airport. In 1998, the airport surpassed the 1.5 million passenger mark.

The year 2000 marked Montpellier-Méditerannée airport's ascent to becoming the 9th largest French airport with 1.75 million passengers – an increase of 18% compared to 1996. However, the aftermath of the September 11 attacks, the introduction of the TGV Méditerannée line and the departure of Air Liberté led to a decline in traffic. In 2002, the airport introduced its first low-cost airline service. The same year, it obtained the ISO 9001 certification, defining requirements for the implementation of a Quality management system.

In 2003, the airport received the official designation of an "airport of national interest" through a government decree. This decision, aligned with the evolution of decentralization laws, granted the Montpellier platform the status of a private company with public capital. In addition, the renewal of the concession allows the Montpellier Chamber of Commerce and Industry to continue to develop the airport until 2008 as manager with the signing of new specifications. The following year, the judicial liquidation of Air Littoral led to the closure of 14 routes.

In 2008, the noise pollution was disputed by the local residents concerned. As a result, from October, airlines, flying clubs, ESMA and the Directorate General of Civil Aviation are committed to a "green trajectory" and to prioritise landings and take-offs by sea. The following year, Montpellier Méditerranée airport, managed by the Montpellier Chamber of Commerce and Industry, was transformed into a public limited company with a management board and supervisory board with a capital of 148,000 euros on 23 June 2009. Montpellier Méditerranée Airport SA was born. The shareholding is distributed as follows: 60% State, 25% Montpellier Chamber of Commerce and Industry, 7% Hérault Department, 6.5% Languedoc-Roussillon Region, 1% Pays de l'Or Community of Municipalities and 0.5% Montpellier Agglomeration.

=== From the 2010s onwards ===
In December 2011, due to magnetic declination, the orientation of the runways was corrected to 12L / 30R (previously 13L / 31R). During the year 2012, the airport witnessed the arrival of three new airlines: Lufthansa, Twinjet and Volotea. Air Arabia also established a new route connecting Montpellier to Marrakech.

In 2014, Brussels Airlines inaugurated the Montpellier–Brussels route, competing with the Ryanair flight to Brussels South Charleroi Airport. In 2016, another milestone occurred when Chalair began operating from Montpellier to Bordeaux. Additionally, Aer Lingus commenced a service from Montpellier to Dublin. The Montpellier link to Paris Orly operated by Air France joins La Navette flights.

In 2018, airport management announces the creation of a terminal building specifically for Low Cost flights. The new facility was scheduled to open in spring 2019. The following year, Ural Airlines commenced the Montpellier–Moscow route, EasyJet expanded its operations with three new routes from Montpellier to (Bristol, Paris-Charles-de-Gaulle and Porto). Ryanair is no longer at the airport following the cancellation of the last link to Brussels-Charleroi.

=== From the 2020s ===
In 2020, Transavia France established a presence, basing two aircraft to operate 21 new routes.

== Facilities ==
The airport is at an elevation of 17 feet (5 m) above mean sea level. It has two asphalt paved runways: 12L/30R is 2,600 by 50 metres (8,530 ft × 164 ft), and 12R/30L is 1,100 by 30 metres (3,609 ft × 98 ft).

== Airlines and destinations ==
The following airlines operate regular scheduled and charter flights at Montpellier–Méditerranée Airport:

Airlines	Destinations
Aer Lingus	Seasonal: Dublin
Air Algérie	Algiers, Oran
Air Arabia	Casablanca, Fès, Nador, Tangier
Air France	Paris–Charles de Gaulle
British Airways	Seasonal: London–Gatwick
easyJet	Basel/Mulhouse, London–Gatwick; Seasonal: Manchester, Palma de Mallorca
KLM	Amsterdam
Luxair	Luxembourg
Norwegian Air Shuttle	Seasonal: Copenhagen, Oslo, Stockholm–Arlanda
Royal Air Maroc	Casablanca
Scandinavian Airlines	Seasonal: Copenhagen
Swiss International Air Lines	Seasonal: Zurich
Transavia	Agadir, Algiers, Lisbon, Marrakesh, Oran, Paris–Orly, Rabat, Seville, Tunis; Seasonal: Athens, Bastia, Djerba, Heraklion, Istanbul, Rome–Fiumicino, Malaga, Tangier
Volotea	Brest, Bordeaux, Caen, Lille, Nantes, Rennes; Seasonal: Ajaccio, Menorca, Strasbourg, Madrid, Lanzarote, Tenerife

== Ground transport ==
- Bus route 620 (Airport Shuttle Bus or Navette in French) runs between Place de l’Europe tramway station and the Airport along Avenue Pierre Mendès-France.
- ÉcoPôle and Parc Expo are the closest Montpellier tramway stations, but the stations are not close to the passenger terminal.

== Airlife magazine ==
Montpellier Airport's quarterly magazine, Airlife, began publication in 2016. Published by Lysagora Media, the magazine has articles on travel, design, lifestyle and leisure as well as information about the airport and its flight schedules.

== Accidents and incidents ==
- On 24 September 2022, West Atlantic flight SWN5745 suffered damages after skidding off the runway 12L while landing during a storm by night. The Boeing 737-400 involved ended up in the Étang de l'Or, a lake situated 180 meters South of the runway. None of the three occupants were injured.
