= Huahine–Fare Airport =

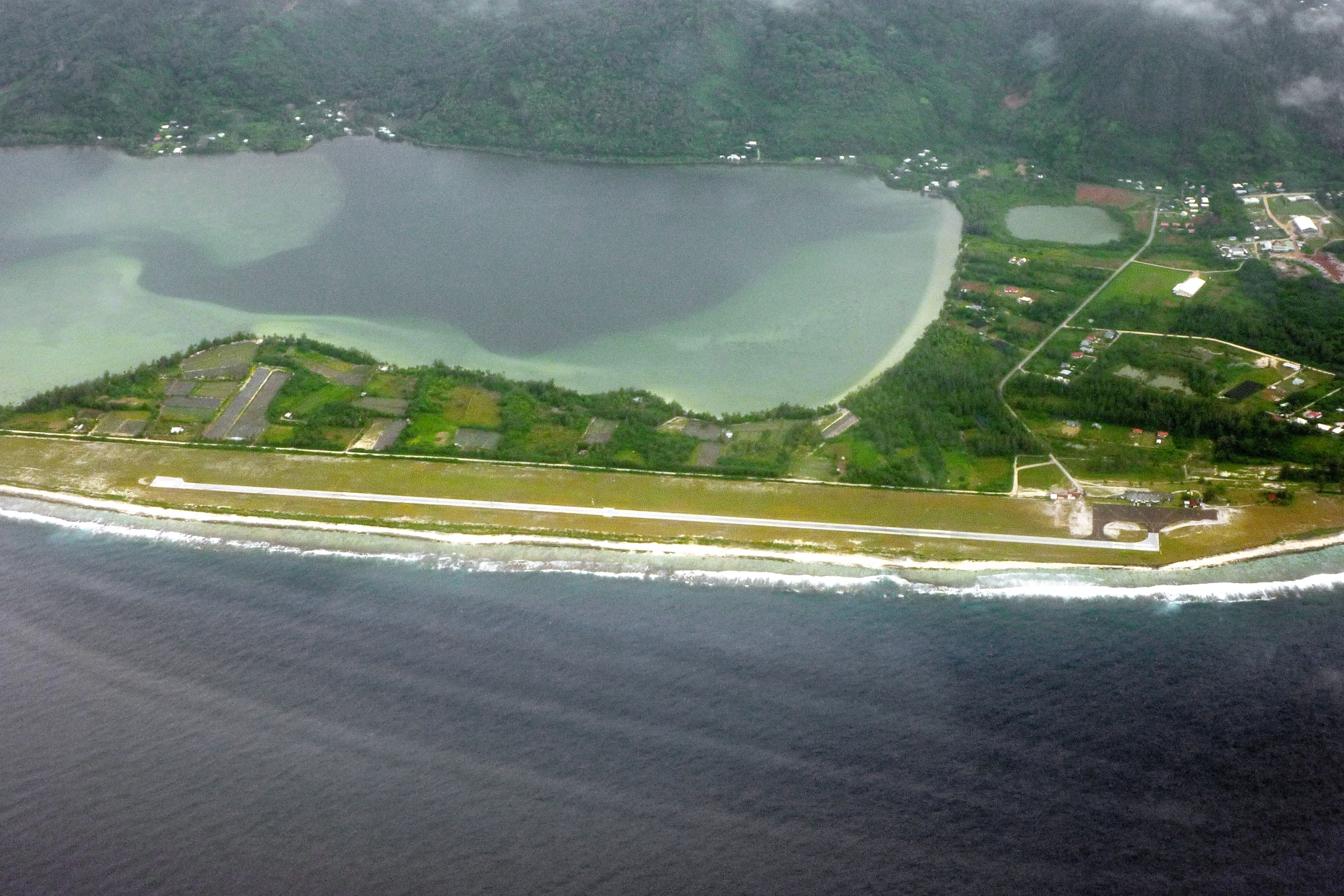
- Huahine–Fare Airport from above, in 2009
- IATA: HUH; ICAO: NTTH

Summary
- Airport type: Public
- Location: Huahine, French Polynesia
- Elevation AMSL: 7 ft / 2 m
- Coordinates: 16°41′14″S 151°1′18″W

Map
- Location within French Polynesia

Runways
Direction	Length		Surface
Direction	ft	m	Surface
07/25	4,921	1,500	Asphalt

Statistics (2018)
- Passengers: 144,120
- Passenger traffic change: ▲6.5%
- Sources: WorldAeroData, Aeroport.fr

Huahine–Fare Airport is an airport serving the island of Huahine in French Polynesia (IATA: HUH, ICAO: NTTH). The airport is located in the northern part of the commune of Fare, on the Island of Huahine Fare, French Polynesia.

== History ==
Starting in the late 1960s, Huahine Airport has a long and illustrious history. The airport was largely utilized for military purposes after being constructed as a military installation by the French military. To handle the rising number of visitors to the island in the 1990s, the airport received repairs and restorations. The airport became the main point of entry for tourists to Huahine after it was formally opened for commercial flights in 1998.

In 2006, 151,907 passengers used the airport.

== Airlines and destinations ==
Airlines	Destinations
Air Moana	Bora Bora, Moorea, Papeete, Raiatea
Air Tahiti	Bora Bora, Moorea, Papeete, Raiatea

== See also ==
- List of airports in French Polynesia
