= Quimper–Bretagne Airport =

Quimper–Bretagne Airport Aéroport de Quimper-Bretagne
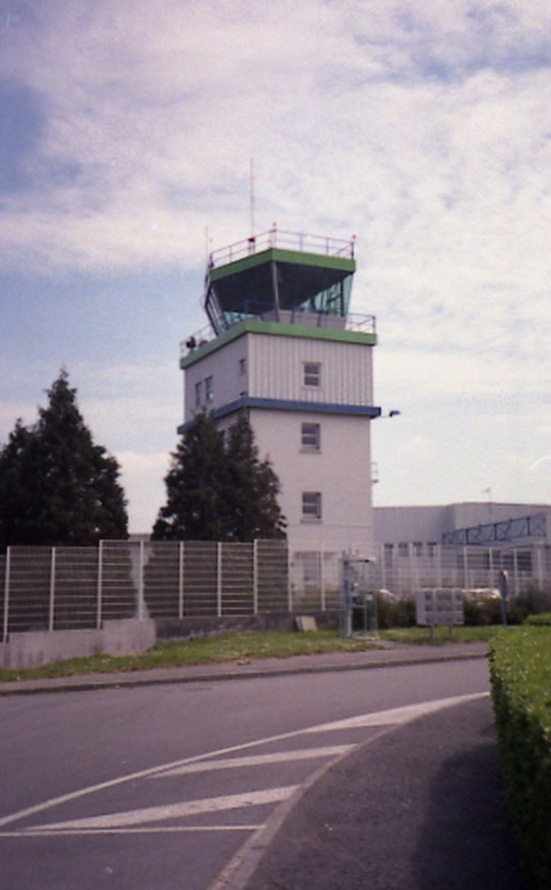
- IATA: UIP; ICAO: LFRQ

Summary
- Airport type: Public
- Operator: SEAQC – Société d'Exploitation de l'Aéroport de Quimper Bretagne
- Serves: Quimper, France
- Location: Pluguffan, France
- Elevation AMSL: 297 ft / 91 m
- Coordinates: 47°58′30″N 004°10′04″W
- Website: https://www.quimper.aeroport.bzh/

Maps
- Location of the Brittany region within France

- Location of airport in the Brittany region

Runways
Direction	Length		Surface
Direction	m	ft	Surface
09/27	2,150	7,054	Asphalt
- Source: French AIP

Quimper–Bretagne Airport (French: Aéroport de Quimper-Bretagne) (IATA: UIP, ICAO: LFRQ), formerly known as Quimper–Cornouaille Airport (French: Aérodrome de Quimper Cornouaille) and Quimper–Pluguffan Airport (French: Aérodrome de Quimper Pluguffan), is an airport located in Pluguffan and 5.5 km southwest of Quimper, both communes of the Finistère department in the Brittany region of France.

== Airlines and destinations ==
As of 30 March 2024, there is no regular commercial airline service at Quimper airport.

Commercial service started in the 1960s with Air Inter flights to Paris-Orly. Most recently, the airport had been served by Chalair Aviation with flights to Orly until 24 November 2023.

Passenger traffic are relocated to Brest Bretagne Airport which is located 83 km (52 mi) which is an hour drive north of Quimper–Bretagne Airport.
