= Poitiers–Biard Airport =

Poitiers–Biard Airport Aéroport de Poitiers – Biard
- IATA: PIS; ICAO: LFBI

Summary
- Airport type: Public
- Operator: CCI Vienne
- Serves: Poitiers, France
- Location: Biard
- Elevation AMSL: 423 ft / 129 m
- Coordinates: 46°35′15″N 000°18′24″E
- Website: www.poitiers.aeroport.fr

Map
- Location in Nouvelle-Aquitaine region LFBI (France)

Runways
Direction	Length		Surface
Direction	m	ft	Surface
03/21	2,350	7,710	Asphalt
03R/21L	700	2,297	Grass
03L/21R	1,200	3,937	Grass
- Source: AIP France

Poitiers–Biard Airport (French: Aéroport de Poitiers – Biard, IATA: PIS, ICAO: LFBI) is an airport located at Biard, 2.4 kilometres (1.5 mi) west of Poitiers, in the Vienne department of the Nouvelle-Aquitaine region in France.

== Facilities ==
The airport stands at an elevation of 423 feet (129 m) above mean sea level. It has one paved runway designated 03/21 which measures 2,350 by 45 metres (7,710 ft × 148 ft). It also has a two parallel grass runways: 03R/21L measuring 1,200 by 100 metres (3,937 ft × 328 ft) and 03L/21R measuring 1,200 by 100 metres (3,937 ft × 328 ft). The longer grass runway is for use by glider aircraft.

== Airlines and destinations ==
The following airlines operate regular scheduled and charter flights at Poitiers–Biard Airport:

Airlines	Destinations
Air France	Seasonal: Ajaccio
Ryanair	London–Stansted; Seasonal: Edinburgh
Volotea	Seasonal: Lyon
