= Aurillac–Tronquières Airport =

Aurillac–Tronquières Airport Aéroport d'Aurillac–Tronquières
- IATA: AUR; ICAO: LFLW

Summary
- Airport type: Public
- Operator: Aurillac Agglomération
- Serves: Aurillac, Cantal, Auvergne, France
- Elevation AMSL: 639 m / 2,096 ft
- Coordinates: 44°53′51″N 02°25′00″E
- Website: Aéroport d'Aurillac–Tronquières

Map
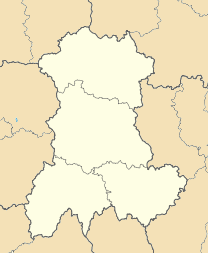
- Location of the airport in Auvergne LFLW (France)

Runways
Direction	Length		Surface
Direction	m	ft	Surface
15/33	1,700	5,577	Asphalt
- Source: French AIP, WAD, GCM, STV

Aurillac–Tronquières Airport (French: Aéroport d'Aurillac–Tronquières) (IATA: AUR, ICAO: LFLW) is an airport located 3 kilometres (1.9 mi) southwest of Aurillac, a commune of the Cantal département in the Auvergne région of France.

== Airlines and destinations ==
The following airlines operate regular scheduled and charter flights at Aurillac Airport:

Airlines	Destinations
Chalair Aviation	Paris–Orly
