= Chalair Aviation =

French regional airline

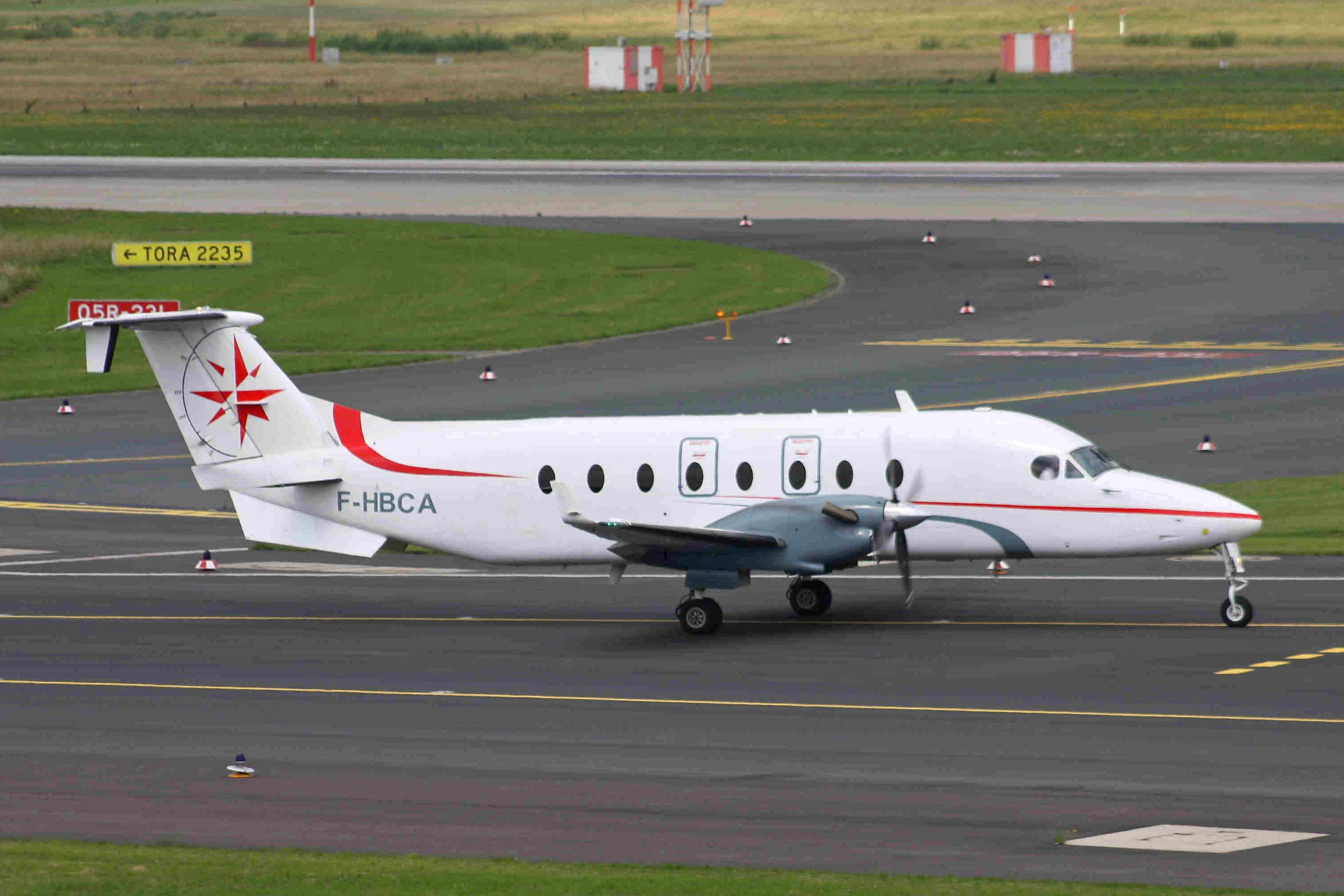
- Beech 1900D
IATA	ICAO	Call sign
CE	CLG	CHALLAIR
- Founded: October 1986
- Hubs: Caen - Carpiquet Airport
- Focus cities: Bordeaux–Mérignac Airport
- Frequent-flyer program: Flying Blue
- Fleet size: 7
- Destinations: 17
- Headquarters: Carpiquet, France
- Key people: Alain Battisti
- Website: chalair.eu

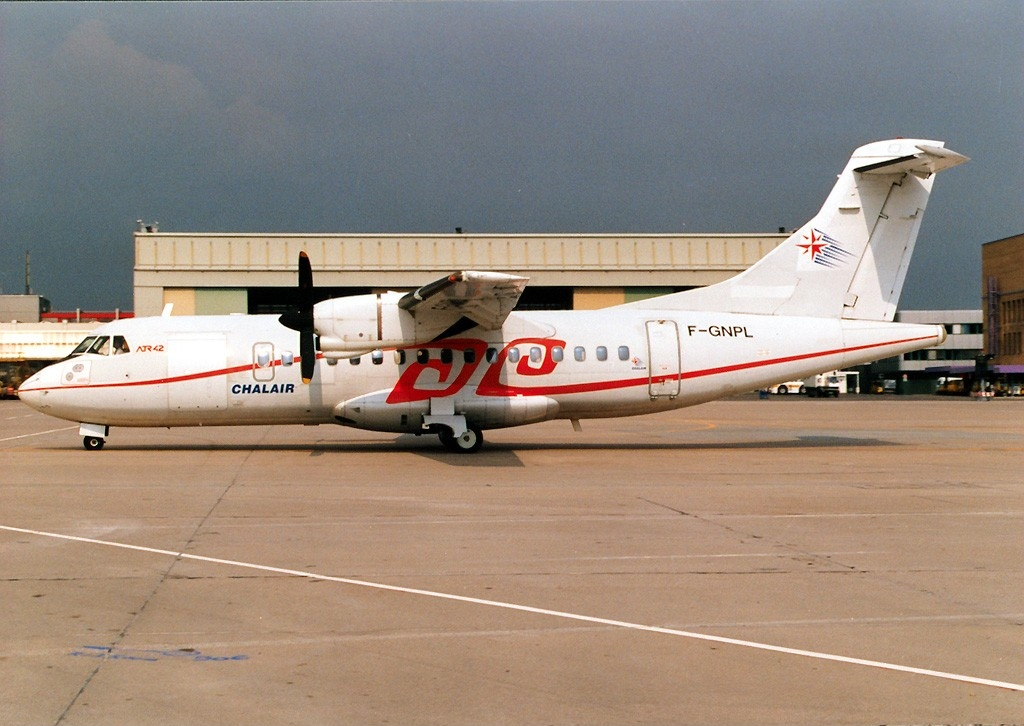
ATR 42-300

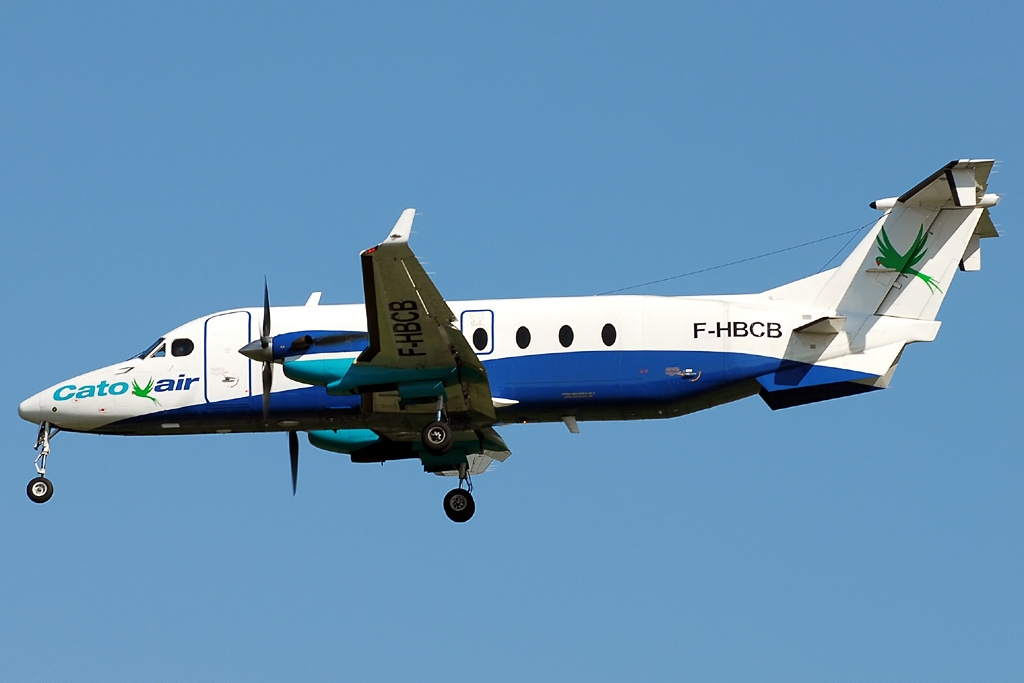
Beech 1900D with Catovair titles

Chalair Aviation is a French regional airline with headquarters and operational base at Carpiquet Airport of Caen. It operates scheduled regional services as well as ad hoc charter flights.

== History ==
The airline was founded in October 1986 as Chalair by Philippe Lebaron and renamed Chalair Aviation in 1997 when the first scheduled flights were started. Starting 1997, besides business and freight flights, Chalair Aviation began operating a Fairchild Swearingen Metroliner for scheduled flights between Le Mans and Eindhoven and an ATR 42 between Cherbourg and Orly. Between 1997 and 2004, Chalair Aviation operated 1 Fairchild Swearingen Metroliner, 1 ATR 42-300 and 3 Cessna Citation II and CJ2 jets.

The airline provides scheduled services as well as corporate shuttle services, freight (including toxic and corrosive material), business and sanitary flights, pilot certification and training, aircraft management and engineering and neighboring islands and JAR Part 145 maintenance services. The airline now employs a total 42 persons, among them 27 are pilots.

In July 2016, Chalair Aviation took over the Antwerp to Hamburg route from bankrupt VLM Airlines, inaugurating its first service to Germany after stopping flights between Lyon and Cologne.

German startup airline brand Green Airlines selected Chalair Aviation as their operating carrier for German domestic services from February 2021.

== Destinations ==
Chalair Aviation operates to the following destinations under their own brand as of July 2019:

=== France ===
- Agen – Agen La Garenne Airport (Terminated)
- Ajaccio – Ajaccio Napoleon Bonaparte Airport (Summer Seasonal)
- Aurillac – Aurillac–Tronquières Airport
- Bastia – Bastia–Poretta Airport (Summer Seasonal)
- Bordeaux – Bordeaux–Mérignac Airport (base)
- Brest – Brest Bretagne Airport
- Carpiquet – Caen–Carpiquet Airport (base)
- Castres – Castres–Mazamet Airport
- Limoges – Limoges–Bellegarde Airport
- Lyon – Lyon–Saint Exupéry Airport
- Montpellier – Montpellier–Méditerranée Airport
- Nantes – Nantes Atlantique Airport
- Paris – Orly Airport
- Pau – Pau Airport
- Quimper – Quimper–Cornouaille Airport
- Rennes – Rennes–Saint-Jacques Airport

=== United Kingdom ===
- Southampton – Southampton Airport (Summer Seasonal)

=== Ireland ===
- Kerry – Kerry Airport (Summer Seasonal)

=== Belgium ===
- Brussels – Brussels Airport (Summer Seasonal)

== Airline partnerships ==
Chalair Aviation currently has a codeshare partnership with Air Caraibes.

== Fleet ==
=== Current fleet ===
As of July 2026, Chalair Aviation operates the following aircraft:

Aircraft	In service	Orders	Passengers	Notes
ATR 42-500	3	—	48	1 parked
ATR 72-500	2	—	70	F-HAPL
Beech 1900D	2	—	19	
Total	7	—		

=== Former fleet ===
As of August 2025, Chalair Aviation operated 3 ATR 42-500, 2 ATR 72-500 and 2 Beech 1900D.
