= Raiatea Airport =

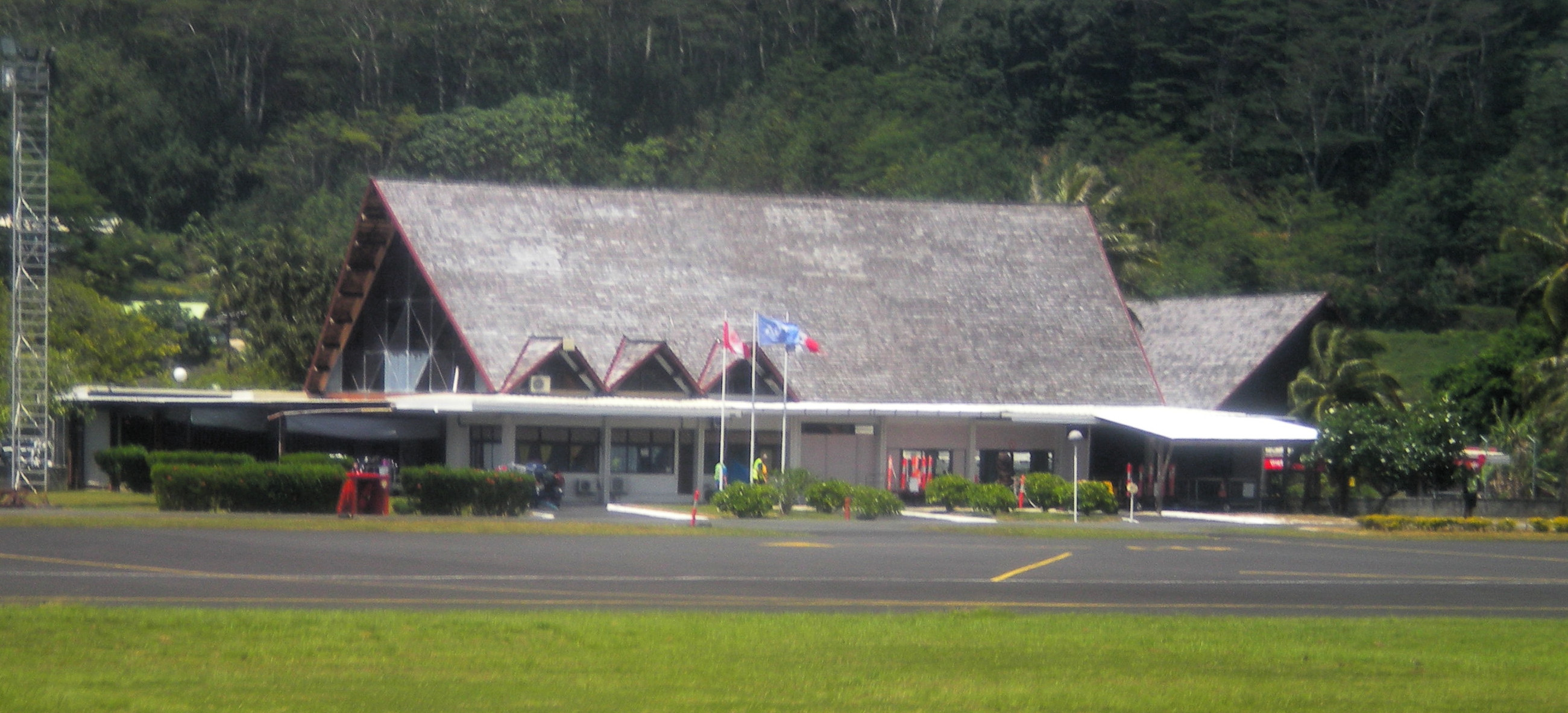
- IATA: RFP; ICAO: NTTR

Summary
- Airport type: Public
- Serves: Raiatea, French Polynesia, France
- Location: Uturoa, French Polynesia
- Elevation AMSL: 6 ft / 2 m
- Coordinates: 16°43′23.7″S 151°28′0.94″W

Map
- Location of the airport in French Polynesia

Runways
Direction	Length		Surface
Direction	ft	m	Surface
07/25	3,937	1,200	Asphalt

Statistics (2018)
- Passengers: 245,302
- Passenger traffic change: ▲4.8%
- Sources: Aeroport.fr

Raiatea Airport (also known as Uturoa Airport) is an airport on Raiatea, French Polynesia. It is in the village of Uturoa. The airport was inaugurated in 1962, but did not see service in 1964. A backfilling was built on the north part of the island, as no appropriate site could be found on the coast. Many people use this airport to access the nearby island of Taha'a.

In 2014, 207,722 passengers used the airport.

== Airlines and destinations ==
Airlines	Destinations
Air Moana	Huahine-Fare, Papeete
Air Tahiti	Bora Bora, Huahine-Fare, Maupiti, Moorea, Papeete

== Accidents and incidents ==
- On 19 February 1958 at 08:50, a Consolidated Catalina IIA (F-OAVV) of Réseau Aérien Interinsulaire on approach from Papeete had its right wing tip float contact the water during a shallow turn on final approach and sank in 36 meters of water in 10 minutes. 15 of the 26 occupants were killed; the crash found to be the result of poor weather conditions. This crash was French Polynesia's deadliest until Pan Am Flight 816 in 1973.

== See also ==
- List of airports in French Polynesia
