= Maupiti Airport =

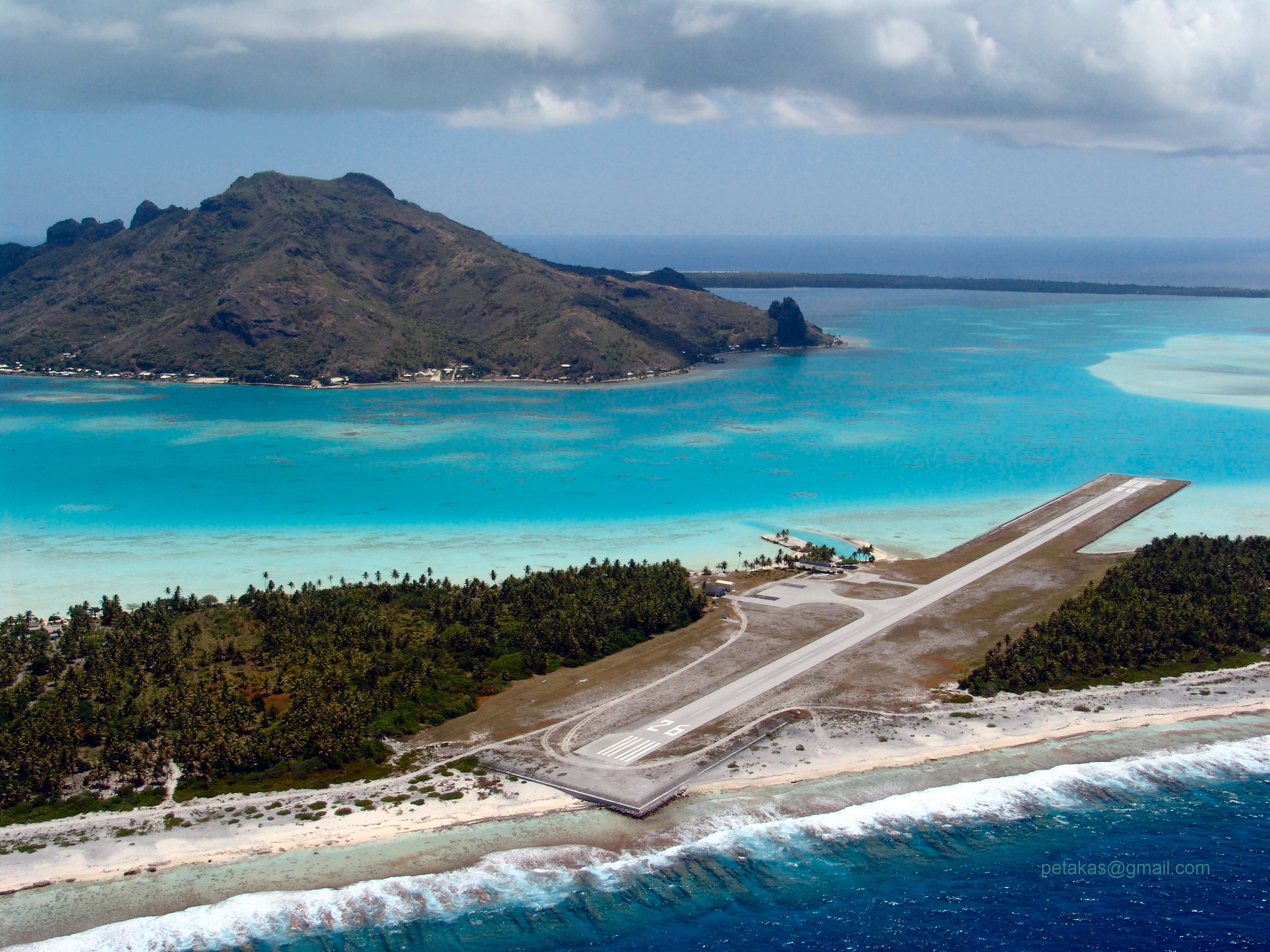
- IATA: MAU; ICAO: NTTP

Summary
- Airport type: Public
- Operator: Government
- Location: Maupiti, Leeward Islands, French Polynesia
- Elevation AMSL: 15 ft (4.6 m)
- Coordinates: 16°25′35″S 152°14′36″W

Map
- Location of airport in French Polynesia

Runways
Direction	Length		Surface
Direction	m	ft	Surface
08/26	956	3,136	Asphalt

Maupiti Airport (IATA: MAU, ICAO: NTTP) is an airport on Maupiti, one of the Leeward Islands in French Polynesia. The airport is 2 kilometres (1.1 NM) north of the village.

== Airlines and destinations ==
Air Tahiti connects Maupiti Airport to Faaʼa International Airport (Papeete), Bora Bora Airport, and Raiatea Airport.

== See also ==
- List of airports in French Polynesia
