= Castres–Mazamet Airport =

Castres - Mazamet Airport Aéroport de Castres - Mazamet
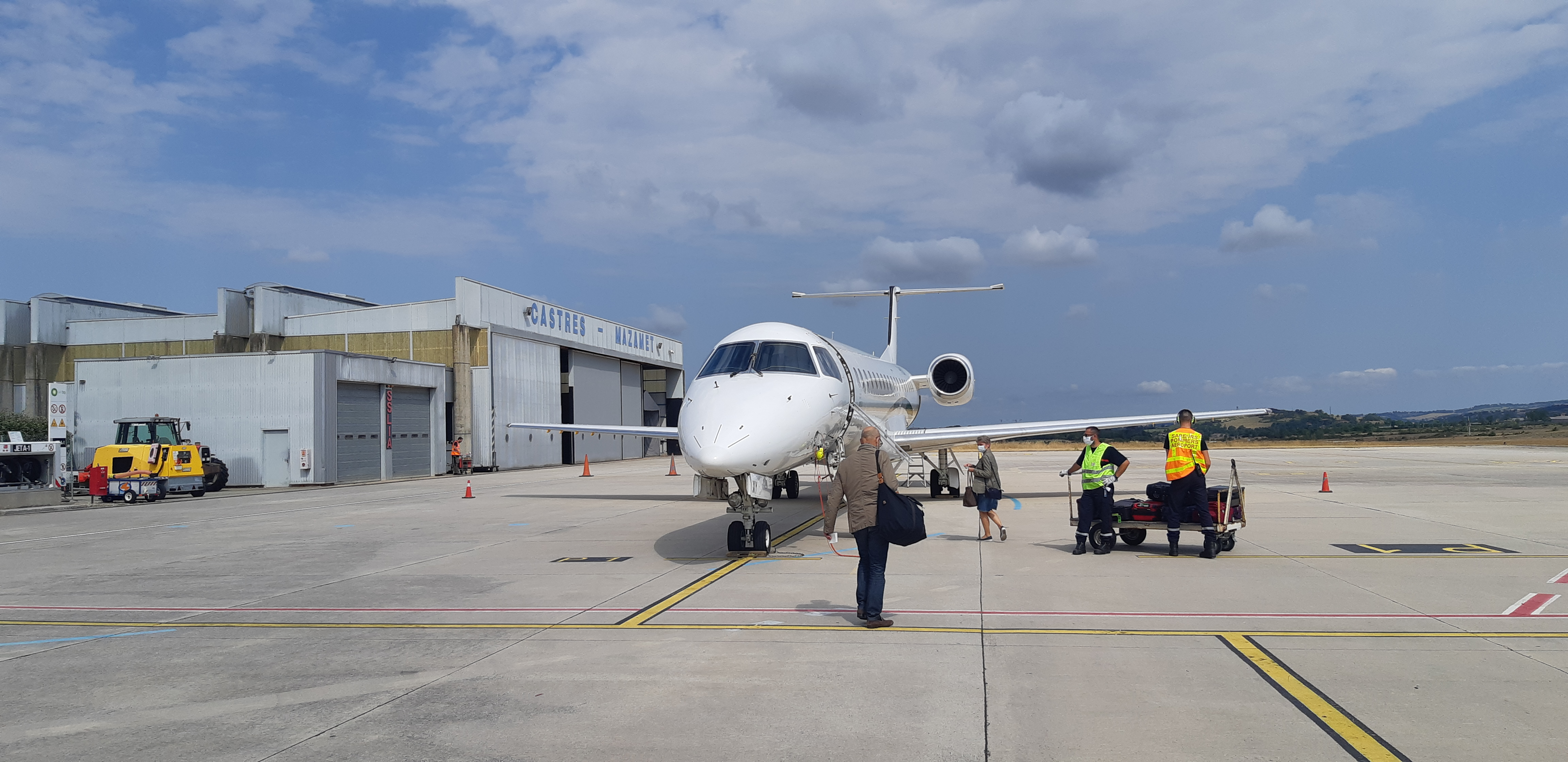
- IATA: DCM; ICAO: LFCK

Summary
- Airport type: Public
- Operator: CCI Castres-Mazamet
- Serves: Castres / Mazamet
- Location: Labruguière, Tarn, France
- Elevation AMSL: 785 ft (239 m)
- Coordinates: 43°33′18″N 002°17′26″E

Map
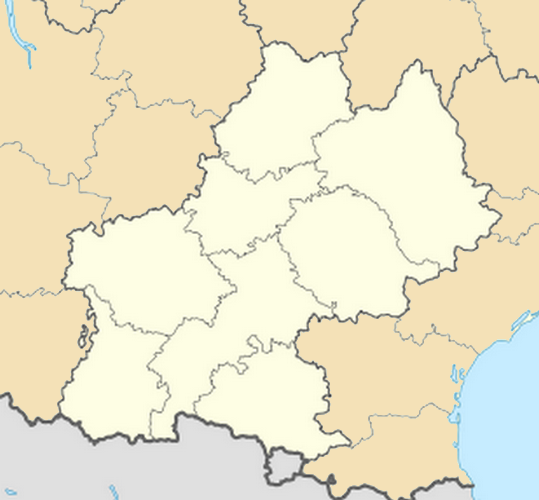
- Location of the airport in Midi-Pyrénées LFCK (France)

Runways
Direction	Length		Surface
Direction	m	ft	Surface
14/32	1,825	5,988	Concrete
- Sources: French AIP, UAF, DAFIF

Castres – Mazamet Airport (French: Aéroport de Castres - Mazamet) (IATA: DCM, ICAO: LFCK) is an airport serving Castres and Mazamet and the east of Midi-Pyrénées. The airport is located 7 km (4 mi) southeast of Castres and northwest of Mazamet, near the commune of Labruguière, in the Tarn department.

== Facilities ==
The airport is at an elevation of 239 metres (784 ft) above mean sea level. It has one paved runway designated 14/32 which measures 1,825 by 30 metres (5,988 ft × 98 ft). The airport is VFR and IFR compliant.

== Airlines and destinations ==
The following airlines operate regular scheduled and charter flights at Castres–Mazamet Airport:

Airlines	Destinations
Chalair Aviation	Paris–Orly
