= Rennes–Saint-Jacques Airport =

Airport in Brittany, France

Rennes–Saint-Jacques Airport Aéroport de Rennes–Saint-Jacques Advanced Landing Ground (ALG) A-27

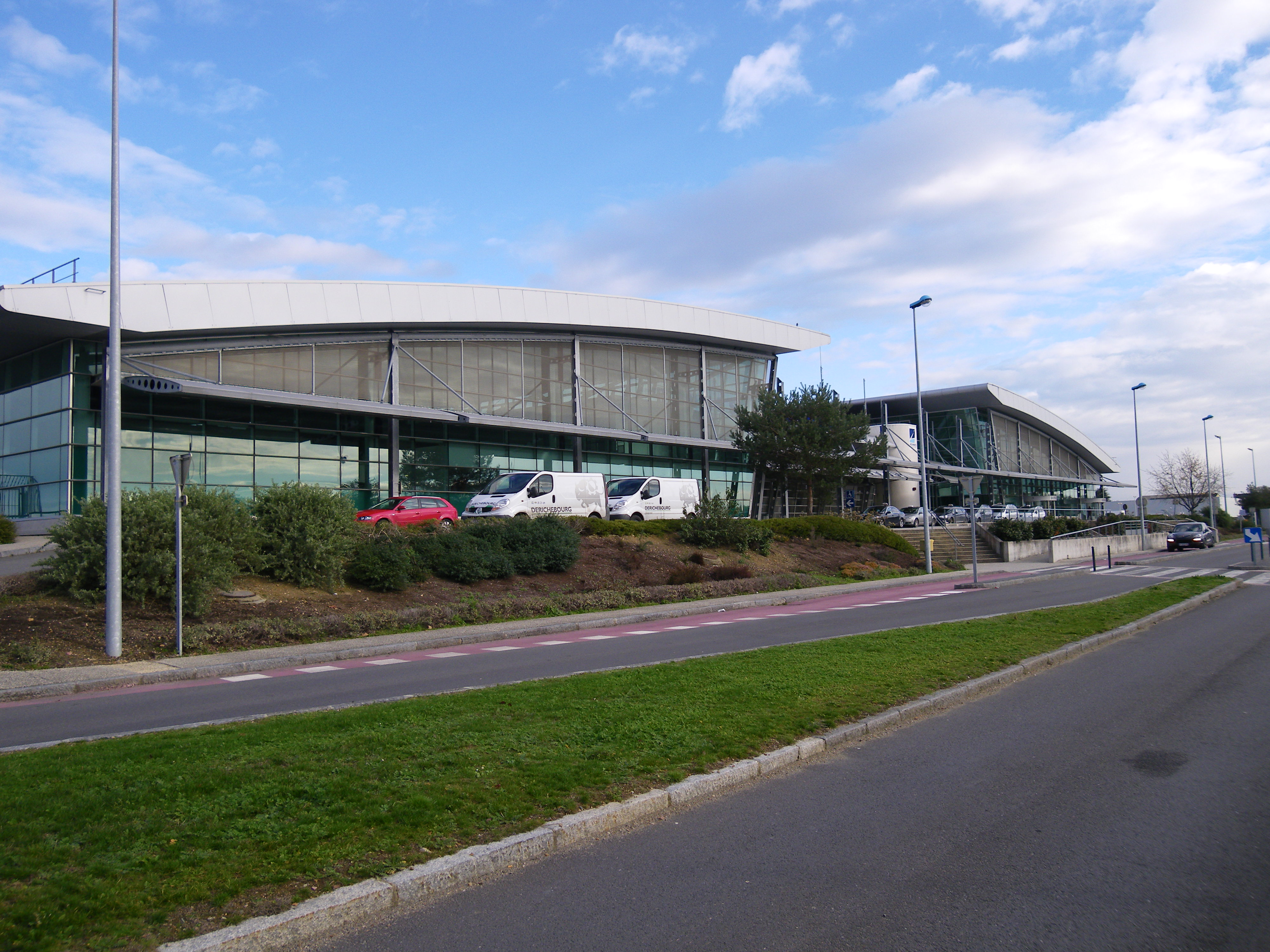
- IATA: RNS; ICAO: LFRN

Summary
- Airport type: Public
- Operator: CCI Rennes
- Serves: Rennes, France
- Elevation AMSL: 37 m (121 ft)
- Coordinates: 48°04′N 001°44′W
- Website: www.rennes.aeroport.fr

Map
- Location of Rennes–Saint-Jacques Airport RNS/LFRN (France)

Runways
Direction	Length		Surface
Direction	m	ft	Surface
10/28	2,100	6,890	Paved
14/32	850	2,788	Paved
14L/32R	650	2,132	Unpaved

Statistics (2018)
- Passengers: 856,791
- Passenger traffic change: ▲18.2%
- Source: Air Journal, Aeroport.fr

Rennes–Saint-Jacques Airport (IATA: RNS, ICAO: LFRN) — also known as Rennes Bretagne Airport — is a minor international airport about 6 km (3.7 mi) southwest of Rennes, Ille-et-Vilaine, in the region of Brittany, France.

== History ==
Before the construction of this airport, Rennes had a small hippodrome which was used as a landing strip in Gayeulles, to the northeast of the city. In 1931, work started on a proper airport to service Rennes, and a plot of 380,000 square metres in Saint-Jacques-de-la-Lande to the southwest of the city was acquired and building began. On 28 July 1933, the new airport was officially opened by Pierre Cot.

Seized by the Germans in June 1940 during the Battle of France, Rennes airport was used as a Luftwaffe military airfield during the occupation. Known units assigned (all from Luftflotte 3, Fliegerkorps IV):

- Jagdgeschwader 53 (JG 53) – July – 23 August 1940 – Messerschmitt Bf 109E
- Kampfgeschwader 27 (KG 27) – 27 July 1940 – April 1941 – Heinkel He 111P/H (Fuselage Code 1G+)
- Kampfgeschwader 26 (KG 26) – 26 April – June 1942 – Heinkel He 111H (Fuselage Code 1H+)
- Kampfgeschwader 77 (KG 77) – 30 May – 30 June 1942 – Junkers Ju 88A (Fuselage Code 3Z+)
- Schnellkampfgeschwader 10 (SKG 10) – 10 April – 11 June 1943 – Focke-Wulf Fw 190A
- Jagdgeschwader 11 (JG 11) – 7–20 June 1944 – Focke-Wulf Fw 190A

JG 53 and KG 27 took part in operations over England during the Battle of Britain (10 July–31 October 1940); KG 26 and KG 77 also engaged in night aerial attacks over England during 1942; JG 11 and SKG 10 were interceptor units primarily engaging Eighth Air Force heavy bomber (B-17; B-24) operations over Occupied Europe. In addition, numerous Luftwaffe Anti-Aircraft FLAK batteries were controlled from Rennes.

Rennes was attacked by Eighth Air Force Boeing B-17 Flying Fortress bombers on 9 January 1944 (Mission 180), and was overflown on several night leaflet drops during the spring of 1944. The airport was also attacked during the Allied invasion of Normandy during June 1944 on several occasions by Martin B-26 Marauder medium bombers of IX Bomber Command, 323d Bombardment Group. The medium bombers would attack in coordinated raids, usually in the mid-to-late afternoon, with Eighth Air Force heavy bombers returning from attacking their targets in Germany. The attack was timed to have the maximum effect possible to keep the Luftwaffe interceptors pinned down on the ground and be unable to attack the heavy bombers. Also, the Republic P-47 Thunderbolts of Ninth Air Force would be dispatched to perform fighter sweeps over Rennes after the Marauder raids, then meet up with the heavy bombers and provide fighter escort back to England. As the North American P-51 Mustang groups of Eighth Air Force began accompanying the heavy bombers all the way to their German targets by mid-1944, it was routine for them to also attack Rennes on their return to England with a fighter sweep and attack any target of opportunity to be found at the airfield.

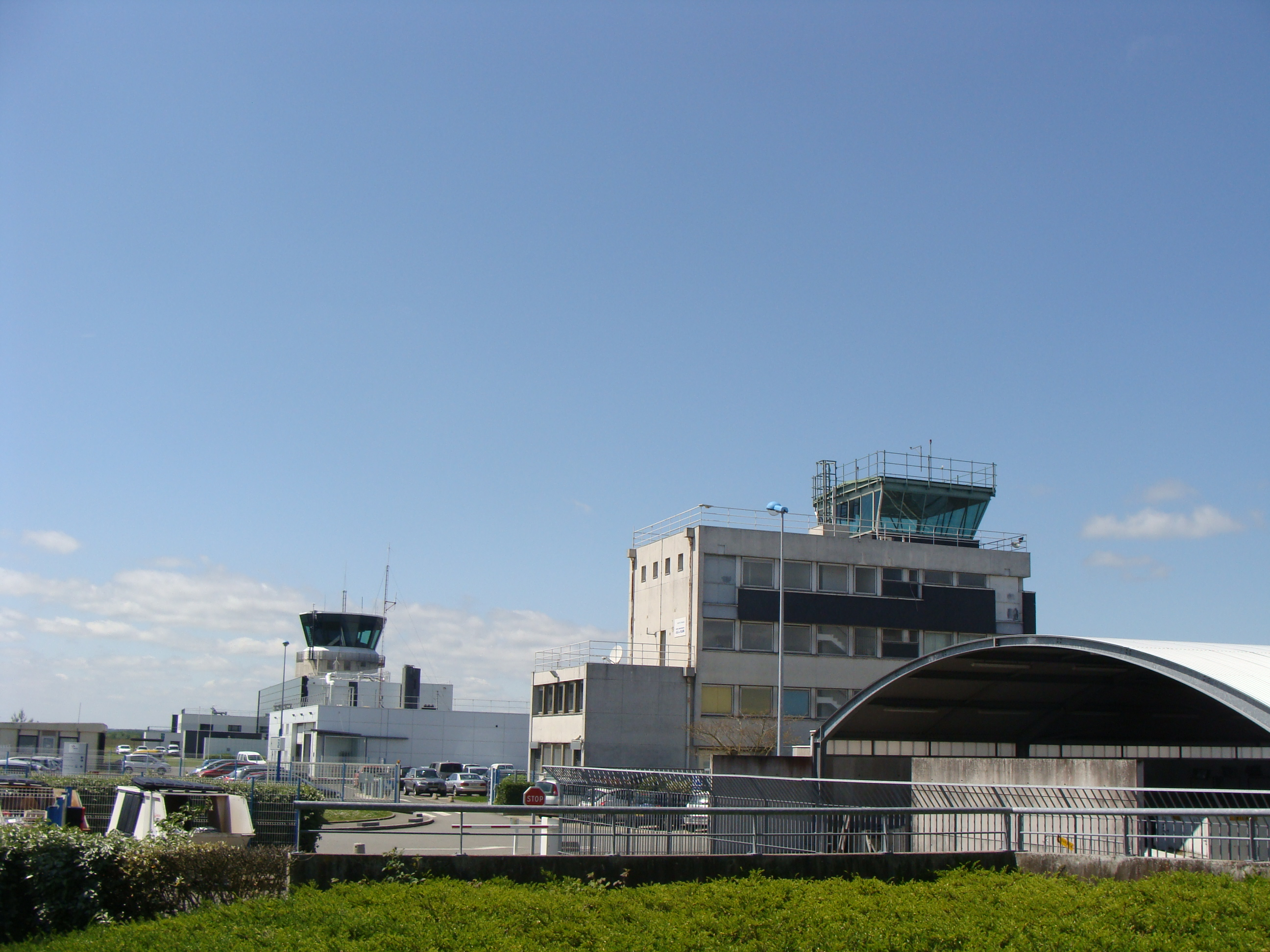
Control tower

It was liberated by Allied ground forces about 7 August 1944 during the Northern France Campaign. Almost immediately, the United States Army Air Forces IX Engineering Command 820th Engineer Aviation Battalion cleared the airport of mines and destroyed Luftwaffe aircraft. Subsequently, Rennes Airport became a USAAF Ninth Air Force combat airfield, designated as "A-27" about 10 August.

Under American control, the 362d Fighter Group operated P-47 Thunderbolts from the airport from 10 August though 19 September. In addition, the 10th Reconnaissance Group operated various photo-reconnaissance aircraft during August and September, and it became the headquarters of IX Air Defense Command on 25 August. The fighter planes flew support missions during the Allied campaign in Central and Eastern France, patrolling roads in front of the advancing ground forces; strafing German military vehicles and dropping bombs on gun emplacements, anti-aircraft artillery and concentrations of German troops.

The combat units moved out by the end of September, and Rennes Airport was used as a supply and maintenance depot for American aircraft for several months, before being returned to French civil control on 30 November 1944. Completely reconstructed after the war, the airport returned to its normal civil use. Some World War II bomb craters can still be seen in grassy areas north of the main runway.

== Facilities ==
The main runway can be used by aircraft with up to around 180 passengers, and it is best fitted for middle-range flights. For cargo transportation services, it is suitable for planes like Boeing up to the 757 and the 767, the Airbus A310, or the Ilyushin IL-76. It is equipped with an ILS. The secondary paved runway is suitable for light motorized planes (business and leisure).

A controversial long-time project to build a large airport near Nantes, the Aéroport du Grand Ouest, some 80 km to the south of Rennes is still in an uncertain state. That airport was planned to serve both cities. It would require the building of faster and more frequent transit services to both cities and to their existing airports, through the modernization of the existing regional Rennes–Nantes railway link through Redon, and the interconnection with their fast TGV railway stations. On 17 January 2017, the French government decided to definitely cancel the project for this new airport, and allow credits to help development of Rennes airport.

== Airlines and destinations ==
=== Passenger ===
Airlines	Destinations
Air Corsica	Seasonal: Ajaccio, Bastia
Air France	Lyon, Paris–Charles de Gaulle; Seasonal: Ajaccio, Bastia, Calvi, Figari, Marseille, Nice
easyJet	London–Gatwick, Nice, Geneva; Seasonal: Manchester
Finist'air	Seasonal: Belle Île
KLM	Amsterdam
Transavia	Marrakesh; Seasonal: Ajaccio
Twin Jet	Toulouse
Volotea	Marseille, Toulouse; Seasonal: Montpellier

=== Cargo ===
Airlines	Destinations
Swiftair	Cologne/Bonn

== See also ==
- Advanced Landing Ground
