= Nantes Atlantique =

Nantes Atlantique may refer to:

- FC Nantes, known as FC Nantes Atlantique from 1992 to 2007
- Nantes Atlantique Airport, in France
