= Biarritz Pays Basque Airport =

Biarritz Pays Basque Airport Aéroport de Biarritz Pays Basque Biarritz Euskal Herriko Aireportua
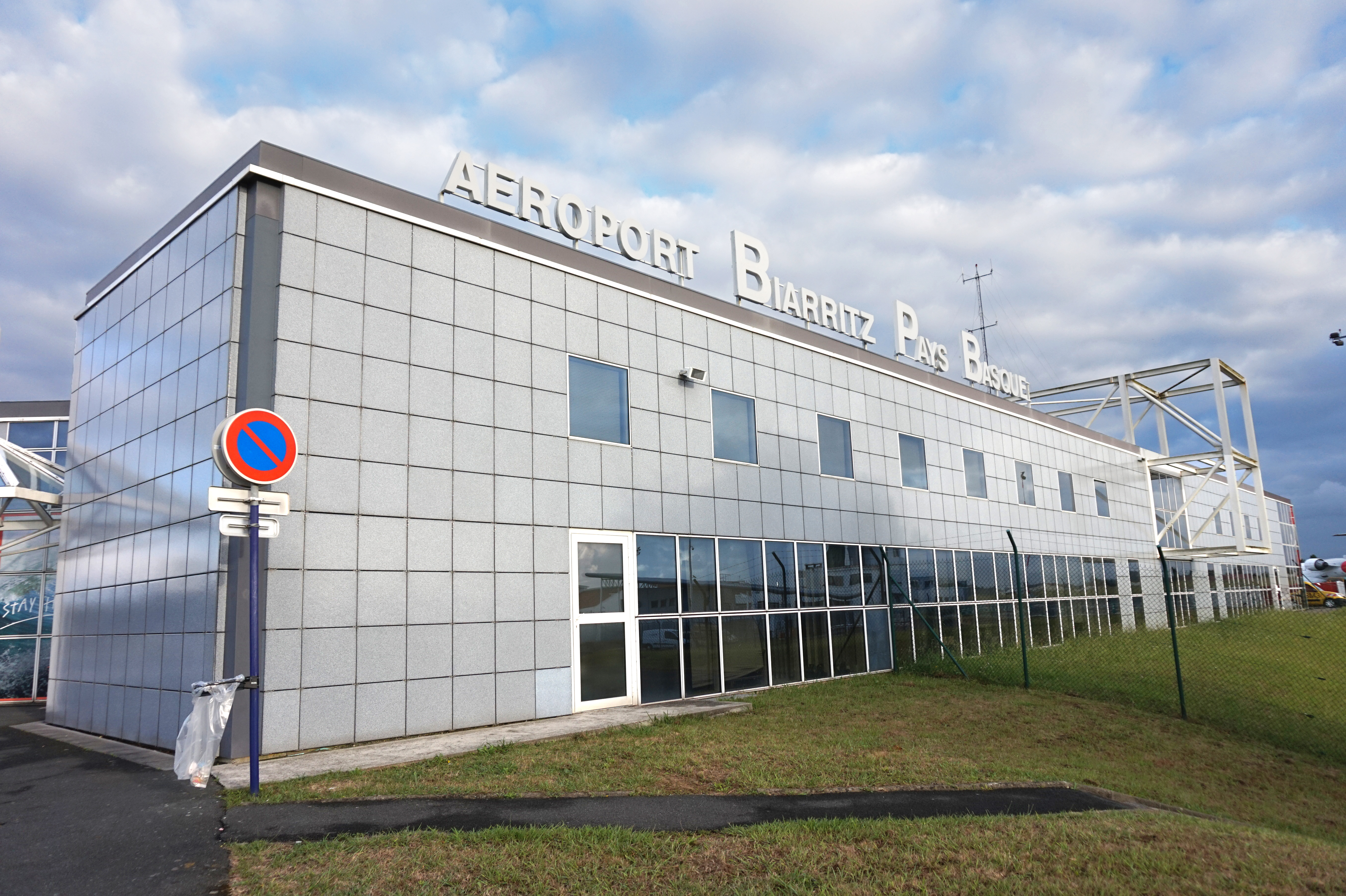
- IATA: BIQ; ICAO: LFBZ

Summary
- Airport type: Public
- Location: Biarritz
- Elevation AMSL: 245 ft (75 m)
- Coordinates: 43°28′06″N 01°31′24″W
- Website: www.biarritz.aeroport.fr

Map
- Location of the airport in Nouvelle-Aquitaine Location of the airport in France

Runways
Direction	Length		Surface
Direction	ft	m	Surface
09/27	7,382	2,250	Asphalt

Statistics (2025)
- Passengers: 935,404
- Passenger Change 24-25: ▲1.9%

Biarritz Pays Basque Airport (IATA: BIQ, ICAO: LFBZ), also known as Biarritz Airport or Biarritz-Parme Airport, is an airport serving Biarritz, French Basque Country. It is located 5 km (3.1 mi) southeast of Biarritz, near Bayonne and Anglet. The airport opened on 11 April 1954.

== Facilities ==
The airport is 245 feet (75 m) above mean sea level. It has one paved runway designated 09/27 which measures 2,250 by 45 metres (7,382 ft × 148 ft).

== History ==
In 2020, the Basque airport was shaken by the global pandemic and saw its infrastructure closed between March and May. A total of 383,366 passengers (down 64.04%) transited through the platform. In 2019, the airport welcomed the aircraft of many delegations during the G7 meeting organized in Biarritz.

== Airlines and destinations ==
The following airlines operate regular scheduled and charter flights to and from Biarritz:

Airlines	Destinations
Air France	Lyon, Paris–Charles de Gaulle; Seasonal: Figari
EasyJet	Lyon; Seasonal: Basel/Mulhouse, London–Gatwick, Málaga, Milan–Malpensa, Nice
Edelweiss Air	Seasonal: Zürich
KLM	Seasonal: Amsterdam
Lufthansa	Seasonal: Munich
Luxair	Seasonal: Luxembourg
Ryanair	Charleroi, London–Stansted; Seasonal: Bergamo, Dublin, Edinburgh
Scandinavian Airlines	Seasonal: Copenhagen, Stockholm–Arlanda
Swiss International Air Lines	Seasonal: Geneva
Transavia	Marrakesh, Paris–Orly; Seasonal: Bastia, Marseille
Volotea	Seasonal: Lille

== Statistics ==
=== Passengers ===
Passengers per Year
Year	Passengers	Change
2025	935,404	▲1,90%
2024	917,541	▼5,50%
2023	970,483	▲4,20%
2022	931,698	▲53,27%
2021	607,864	▲58,56%
2020	383,366	▼64,04%
2019	1,066,204	▼9,92%
2018	1,183,635	▼0,62%
2017	1,190,991	▲4,88%
2016	1,135,482	▲9.2%
2015	1,039,346	▼2.4%
2014	1,064,402	▼3.1%
2013	1,098,079	▲1.2%
2012	1,084,200	▲5.0%
2011	1,032,937	▲4.3%
2010	989,622	▼2.2%
2009	1,011,589	▼1.6%
2008	1,028,006	▲10.4%
2007	930,880	▲7.5%
2006	865,601	▲5.9%
2005	817,083	–

=== Movements ===
Movements per year
Year	Movements	Change
2018	10,761	▼4.89%
2017	11,314	▲3.02%
2016	10.981	▲12.68%
2015	9,745	▲1.65%
2014	9,584	–

== Ground transport ==
The airport is serviced by three bus routes (3, 8, 11), delivering travellers to Biarritz, Bayonne, and Anglet, as well as Bidart and Hendaye. Passengers heading to nearby Spain can take buses operated to Irun, San Sebastian, Pamplona, and Bilbao. Taxis are also accessible at the airport.
