= La Rochelle–Île de Ré Airport =

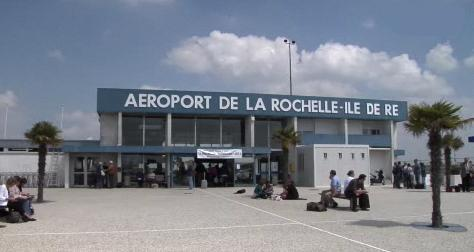
- IATA: LRH; ICAO: LFBH

Summary
- Airport type: International
- Operator: CCI de La Rochelle
- Serves: La Rochelle, France
- Elevation AMSL: 74 ft (23 m)
- Coordinates: 46°10′45″N 001°11′43″W

Map
- Location of the airport in Nouvelle-Aquitaine LFBH (France)

Runways
Direction	Length		Surface
Direction	m	ft	Surface
09/27	2,255	7,398	Asphalt

Statistics (2018)
- Passengers: 240 154
- Increase: ▲8.4%

La Rochelle–Île de Ré Airport (French: aéroport de La Rochelle–Île de Ré) (IATA: LRH, ICAO: LFBH) is an international airport located immediately to the north of the city of La Rochelle, in the Charente-Maritime department, France. The airport also serves the small island of Île de Ré, which is accessible from the mainland via a toll bridge.

== Airlines and destinations ==
The following airlines operate regular scheduled and charter flights at La Rochelle–Île de Ré Airport:

Airlines	Destinations
easyJet	Lyon; Seasonal: Bristol, Geneva, London–Gatwick, Manchester, Nice
Ryanair	Marrakesh, Marseille; Seasonal: Charleroi, Cork, Dublin, London–Stansted
Jet2	Seasonal: Birmingham, Manchester (all start 22nd May 2027),

The nearest larger international airports are Nantes Atlantique Airport, located 137 km (85 mi) north and Bordeaux-Mérignac Airport, 191 km (119 mi) southeast of La Rochelle–Île de Ré Airport.

== Traffic and statistics ==
La Rochelle Airport welcomed 240,154 passengers in 2018, an increase of 8.4% compared to 2017.

Traffic by calendar year
	Passengers	Change from previous year	Movements
1997	37,417	--	--
1998	44,398	▲18.7%	--
1999	57,460	▲29.4%	--
2000	66,007	▲14.9%	35,823
2001	76,681	▲16.2%	34,286
2002	91,854	▲19.8%	35,271
2003	93,802	▲2.1%	--
2004	100,404	▲7.0%	33,432
2005	127,563	▲27.0%	26,573
2006	180,980	▲41.9%	32,689
2007	220,577	▲21.9%	32,974
2008	215,145	▼2.5%	33,212
2009	168,969	▼21.5%	30,145
2010	191,599	▲13.4%	29,736
2011	229,214	▲19.6%	29,679
2012	236,736	▲3.3%	26,242
2013	216,221	▼8.7%	24,360
2014	212,361	▼1.8%	26,198
2015	216,970	▲2.2%	27,507
2016	221,195	▲1.9%	28,799
2017	221,453	▲0.1%	20,660
2018	240,154	▲8.4%	--
