= Ain Arnat Airport =

Ain Arnat Airport Sétif International Airport
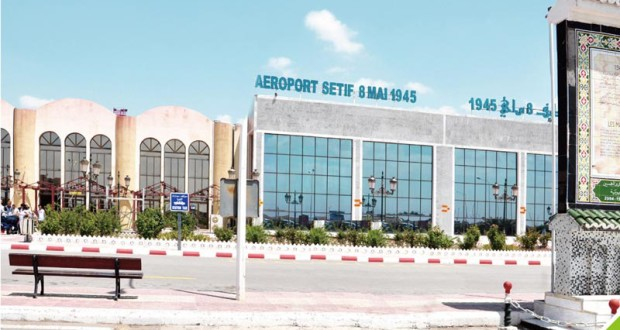
- IATA: QSF; ICAO: DAAS

Summary
- Airport type: Public
- Operator: EGSA-Constantine
- Serves: Sétif, Algeria
- Elevation AMSL: 3,330 ft / 1,015 m
- Coordinates: 36°10′40″N 05°19′45″E

Map
- Location of airport in Algeria

Runways
Direction	Length		Surface
Direction	m	ft	Surface
09/27	2,895	9,498	Asphalt

Statistics (2020)
- Passenger volume: 25,964
- Sources: SkyVector

Ain Arnat Airport (IATA: QSF, ICAO: DAAS), also known as Sétif International Airport, is an airport serving Sétif, Algeria. It was opened in 1945.

== Introduction ==
Setif airport is an international civilian-military airport serving the city of Setif in the region of the Highlands in southern Kabylia, and its region (wilayas of Setif and Bordj-Bou-Arreridj). The airport is managed by the EGSA Constantine.

This airport is also a military airport, hosting the 9th training helicopter regiment (9th RHE) of the Algerian Air Force, as well as an infantry training center and the 4th commando parachute regiment (4th RPC) of the Algerian army.

== History ==
=== Before 1939 ===
The airfield opened in 1919 when the territory was part of French Algeria. The 36th African Aviation Regiment was composed of three African Aviation Groups (GAA); the 3rd GAA was based at Sétif airfield, with the 544 and 549 squadrons.

=== Before 1962 ===
The base became Air Base 144 Sétif-Aïn Arnat. On October 1, 1947, the 3rd Artillery Aviation Group (GAOA 3) installed its aircraft. On April 29, 1955, the Helicopter Group n°2 (GH 2) stationed its aircraft. On August 2, 1959, the helicopter base n°101 was created. The base was dissolved in 1962.

=== Since 1962 ===
After Algeria's independence, the airport was named "8 May 1945" in reference to the killings of Setif, Guelma and Kherrata that took place on that date.

The airport of Setif was a military airport from independence until 1993, when work began on the construction of the terminal building, and the airport was given a national vocation.

Between 2005 and 2007 the terminal was expanded from 2,900 m2 to 6,590 m2, allowing the terminal to increase its capacity to 250,000 passengers/year.

The runway and parking lot were rebuilt in 2016, and a taxiway was also built at the same time, which resulted in the airport being closed for 10 months.

Another extension and modernization of the terminal building was carried out between 2019 and 2021, doubling the airport's capacity from 250,000 passengers per year to more than 450,000 passengers per year.

== Facilities ==
=== Runways ===
The airport has an asphalt concrete runway with a length of 3,000 m

=== Terminal ===
The airport has been renovated and modernized in general with the replacement of baggage carousels as well as the installation of duty free and 8 new stores as well as 4 airline offices and a bank branch.

The terminal also has 10 check-in counters, 8 PAF filters at the level of departures, and at international arrivals, the airport has 11 boxes, one of which is dedicated to disabled persons.

The terminal building has increased from a capacity of 250,000 passengers/year to 450,000 passengers/year and has an area of approximately 1,500 m2 to 6,000 m2. The terminal is now divided into two parts, domestic on one side and international on the other.

There is also a pavilion of honor next to the terminal, allowing the reception of political leaders from all over the country during their airport trips.

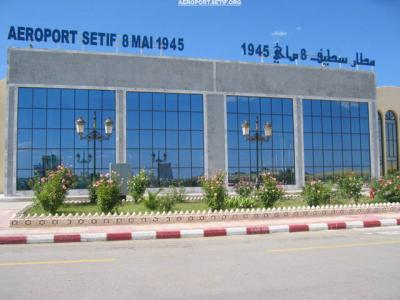
Terminal of the airport.

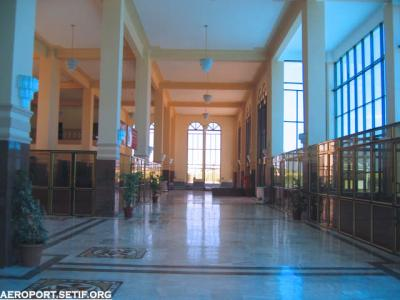
Interior of the airport.

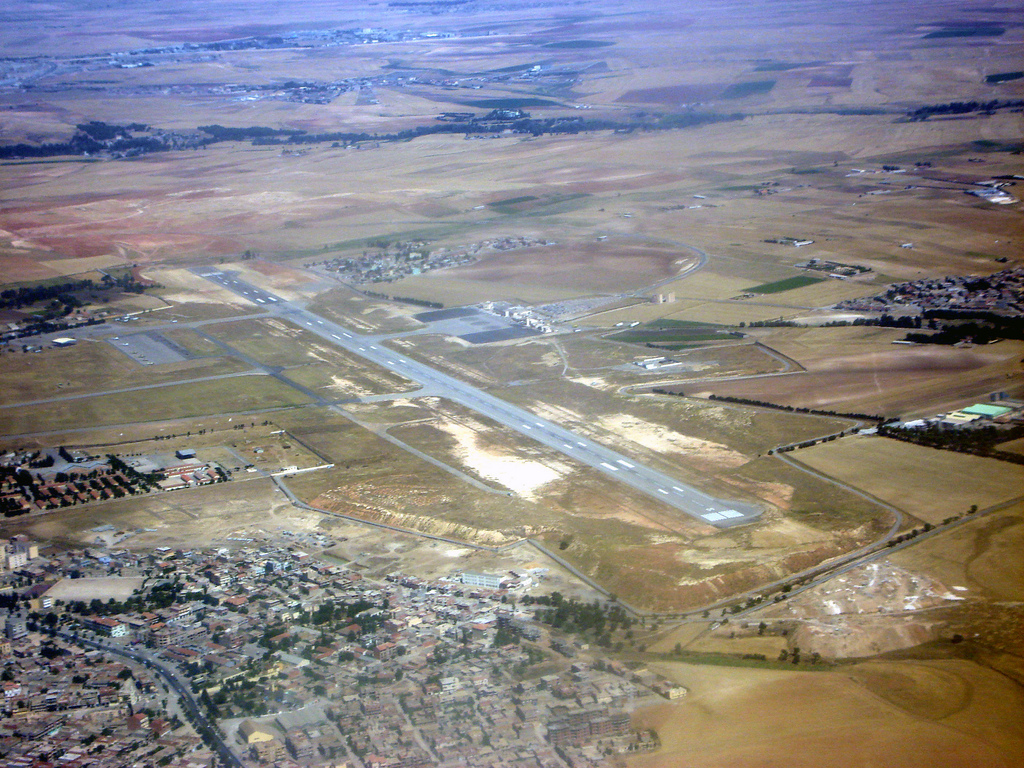
Global view of the airport.

== Airlines and destinations ==
Airlines	Destinations
Air Algérie	Algiers, Lyon, Paris–Orly
ASL Airlines France	Seasonal: Lille
Tassili Airlines	Algiers, Oran
Transavia	Paris–Orly
Volotea	Lyon, Marseille

== Statistics ==
Traffic evolution from 2006 to 2020
Year	2006	2007	2008	2009	2010	2011	2012	2013	2014	2015	2016	2017	2018	2019	2020	2021
National	44 495	55 526	59 881	58 498	31 061	23 171	15 656	17 761	18 496	22 795	8 242	19 416	19 466	14 249	2 300	
International	46 273	124 701	143 910	159 558	166 730	180 685	193 299	205 066	200 322	213 717	78 811	228 809	204 430	186 329	23 664	
Total	90 768	180 227	203 791	218 056	197 791	203 856	208 955	222 827	218 818	236 512	87 053	248 225	223 896	200 578	25 964	

== See also ==
- Transport in Algeria
- List of airports in Algeria
