= Lyon–Saint-Exupéry Airport =

International airport serving Lyon, France

Lyon–Saint Exupéry Airport Aéroport de Lyon-Saint Exupéry

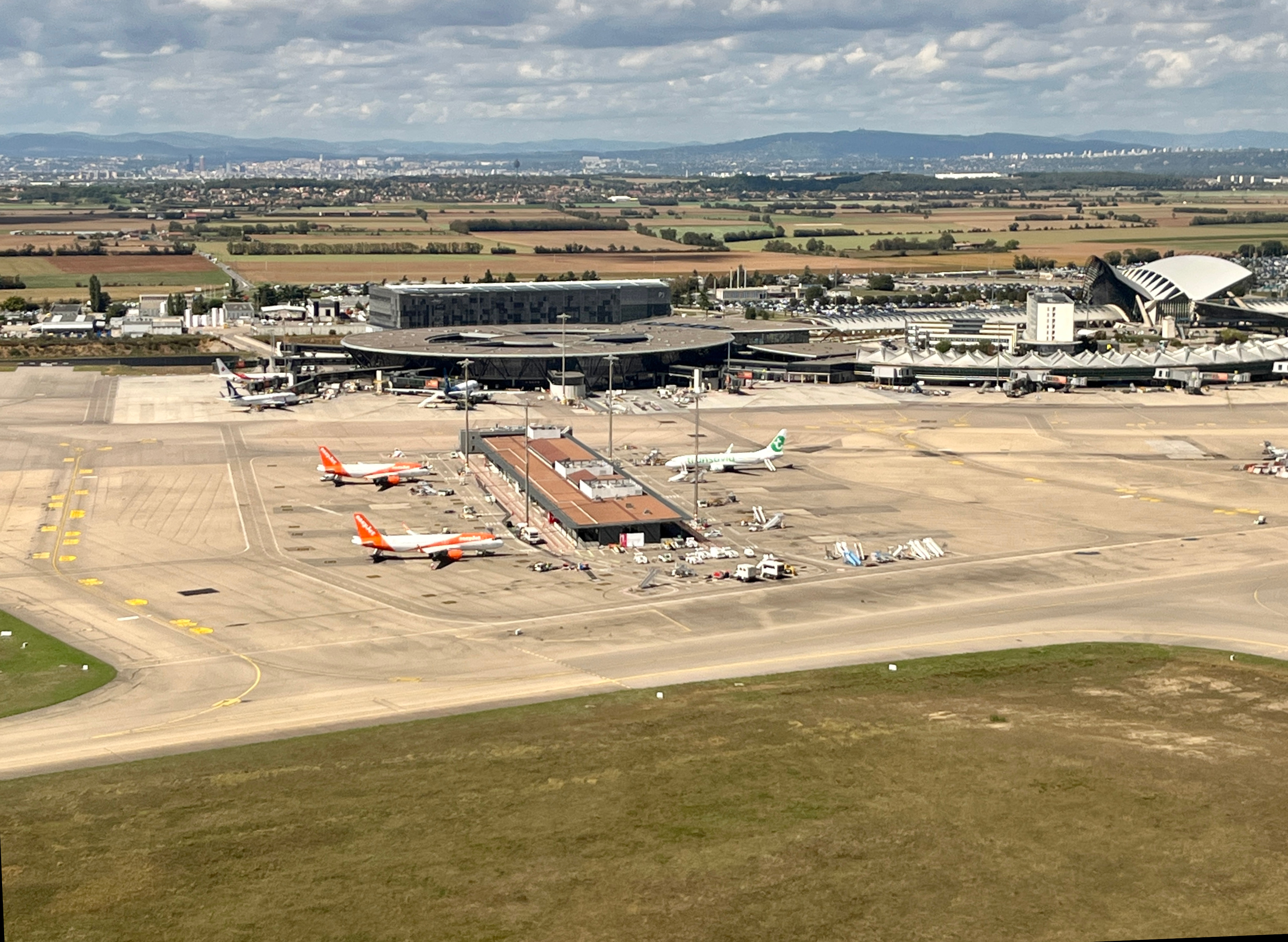
- IATA: LYS; ICAO: LFLL

Summary
- Airport type: Public
- Owner/Operator: Aéroports de Lyon (Vinci SA-Caisse des dépôts consortium)
- Serves: Metropolis of Lyon
- Location: Colombier-Saugnieu, Rhône, France
- Opened: 12 April 1975; 51 years ago
- Focus city for: Air France; easyJet; Transavia France; Twin Jet
- Elevation AMSL: 250 m (820 ft)
- Coordinates: 45°43′32″N 005°04′52″E
- Website: www.lyonaeroports.com

Map
- Location of airport in the Auvergne-Rhône-Alpes region LYS/LFLL (France)

Runways
Direction	Length		Surface
Direction	m	ft	Surface
17R/35L	4,000	13,123	Asphalt
17L/35R	2,670	8,760	Asphalt

Statistics (2025)
- Passengers: 10,709,883
- Passenger change 24-25: 2.4%
- Cargo (Metric tonnes): 54,000
- Cargo change 24-25: ▲1.7%
- Source: VINCI Airports Ministère de l’écologie

Lyon–Saint Exupéry Airport (IATA: LYS, ICAO: LFLL) — formerly known as Lyon Satolas Airport — is an international airport serving Lyon, France, as well as the entire Auvergne-Rhône-Alpes region. It is located in Colombier-Saugnieu, approximately 20 kilometres (12 mi) southeast of Lyon city centre. The airport is 30 minutes from the Lyon-Part-Dieu business district by the Rhônexpress tram.

== History ==
=== Early years ===
The airport was inaugurated by President Valéry Giscard d'Estaing on 12 April 1975, and opened to passengers a week later. It was designed to replace the old Lyon–Bron Airport, which is now only used for general aviation.

In 1994, the LGV Rhône-Alpes high-speed rail line brought TGV service to the airport, providing direct trains to Paris and Marseille. The fan-shaped canopy of the Gare de Lyon Saint-Exupéry, designed by architect Santiago Calatrava, is the airport's most notable architectural feature.

Since 1997, the airport has been a focus city for the airline Air France.

=== Development since the 2000s ===
The airport was originally named Lyon Satolas Airport, after the nearby eponymous village, but in 2000 the airport and train station were renamed in honour of Lyonnais aviation pioneer and writer Antoine de Saint-Exupéry, on the centenary of his birth. He was a native of Lyon, and a laureate of the Grand Prix du roman de l'Académie française, and died in World War II.

In 2013, the airport served 8,562,298 passengers, an increase of 1.3% over the previous year. Air freight increased by 22.7% to 44,820 tonnes, although overall aircraft movements dropped by 2.8% to 113,420.

== Facilities ==
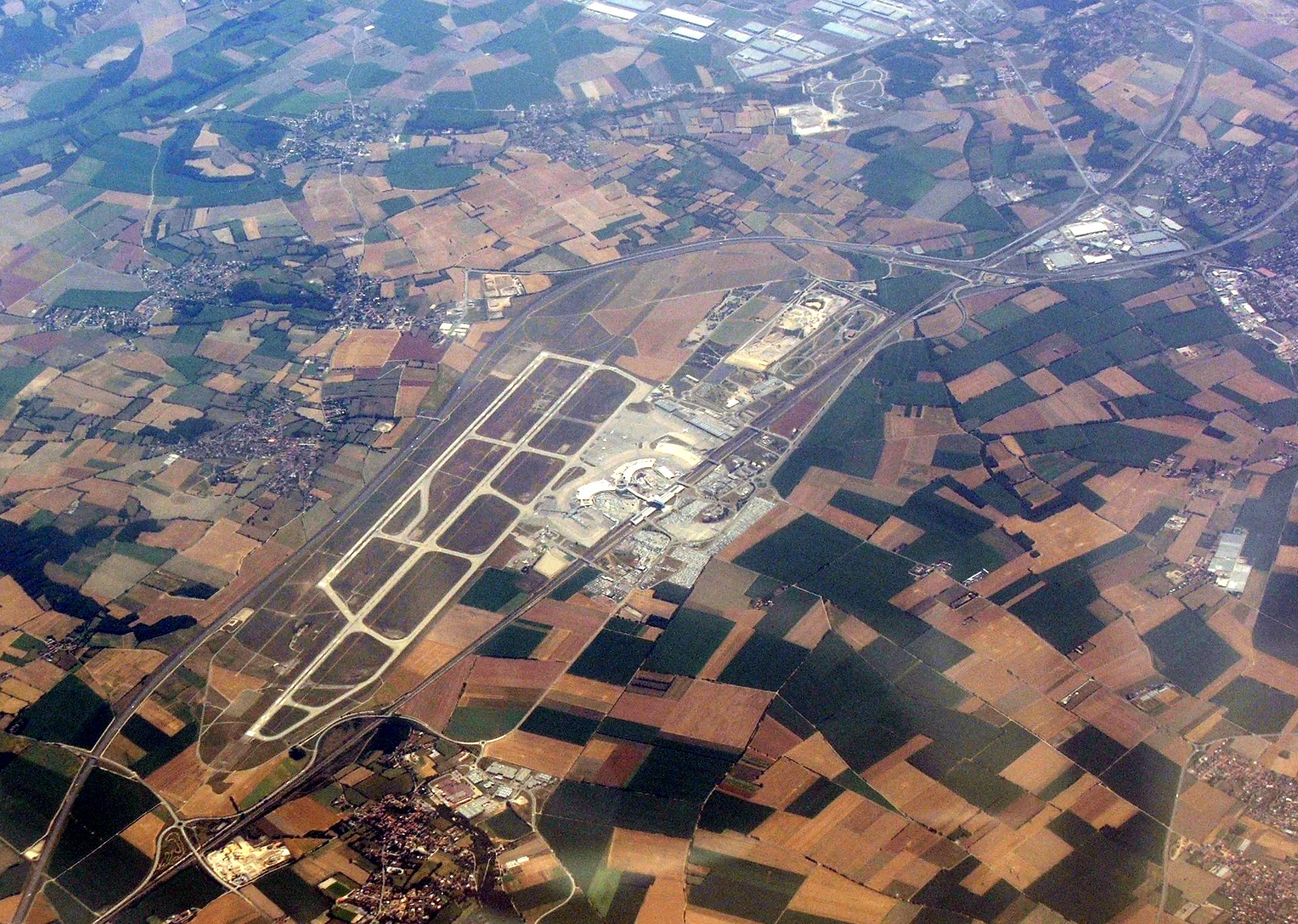
Aerial view

The airport consists of passenger terminals 1 and 2 which are interconnected on the landside by a central building that itself has a foot-bridge to the nearby Gare de Lyon Saint-Exupéry high-speed railway station and the Rhônexpress terminus. The airport also features two runways as well as cargo facilities. A total of 16,000 car spaces in four car parks (P2-P5) are available. Two of the parks are underground (P2 and P3) while the long-stay parks (P4 and P5) are located at a distance from the terminals behind the railway station.

=== Terminal 1 ===
Terminal 1 consists of two parts: The older part is a two-storey, slightly curved, brick shape building which contains the check-in areas 11, 12, 14, 18 and 19 as well as departure areas G and F on the upper level with the arrivals on the ground level. In 2014, Aéroports de Lyon started the construction of a new terminal expansion, which doubled the capacity and the area, with 70,000 m^{2} (750,000 sq ft). Four groups took part in the tender process to design and develop the expanded Terminal 1. The bid was won by the GFC Construction company in partnership with Quille Construction (Bouygues) and Bouygues Energies & Services. The architectural practice was Rogers Stirk Harbour + Partners led by Graham Stirk, Chabanne and Partners, engineers Technip TPS and Cap Ingélec, and Inddigo. The expanded Terminal 1 opened in June 2018. It has a circular shape with check-in area 10 and additional arrivals facilities on the ground level and departure gates B and C on both upper levels. It is also connected by a tunnel to a small satellite building containing the D gates, now mainly used by easyJet and Transavia France, while the other areas serve Star Alliance carriers and Emirates, among others.

=== Terminal 2 ===
Terminal 2 is a duplicate of the older part of Terminal 1, containing check-in areas 20 and 21 with boarding areas Q and P on the upper level and arrivals facilities on the lower level.

Terminal 2 was closed for renovations in June 2022. This project included upgrades to baggage handling and security systems, along with new shops and restaurants. The terminal reopened in April 2024, with flights from Volotea, ASL Airlines France, Air Arabia, and Norwegian Air being relocated there.

On April 1, 2026, Terminal 2 was closed and all flights relocated to Terminal 1, in order to carry out work aimed at modernizing and improving the infrastructure of the airport. No schedule was announced for reopening.

=== Former Terminal 3 ===
The former Terminal 3 was a very basic facility used by low-cost carriers. It was demolished during Terminal 1 expansion. The satellite building is still open, however; it now houses the ‘D’ gates for low cost airlines such as easyJet.

== Airlines and destinations ==
=== Passenger ===
Airlines	Destinations
Aegean Airlines	Seasonal: Athens, Heraklion
Aer Lingus	Dublin; Seasonal: Cork
Air Algérie	Algiers, Annaba, Batna, Béjaïa, Biskra, Constantine, Oran, Sétif, Tlemcen
Air Arabia	Casablanca, Fès, Tangier
Air Cairo	Seasonal: Luxor
Air Canada	Montréal–Trudeau
Air Corsica	Ajaccio, Bastia; Seasonal: Calvi, Figari
Air Dolomiti	Frankfurt; Seasonal: Munich
Air France	Amsterdam, Biarritz, Bordeaux, Brest, Caen, Lille, Marseille, Nantes, Nice, Paris–Charles de Gaulle, Pau, Rennes, Toulouse; Seasonal: Figari
Air Montenegro	Podgorica
Air Transat	Montréal–Trudeau; Seasonal: Québec City (begins 9 June 2027)
AJet	Istanbul–Sabiha Gökçen
ASL Airlines France	Algiers Paris–Charles de Gaulle; Seasonal: Pristina
Austrian Airlines	Vienna
British Airways	London–Heathrow; Seasonal: London–Gatwick
Brussels Airlines	Brussels
Chalair Aviation	Limoges
Corsair International	Saint-Denis de la Réunion
Croatia Airlines	Seasonal: Split
easyJet	Alicante, Athens, Barcelona, Biarritz, Bordeaux, Budapest, Copenhagen, Edinburgh, Faro, Figari, Funchal, Gran Canaria, Hurghada, Lanzarote, La Rochelle, Lisbon, London–Gatwick, London–Luton, Madrid, Málaga, Manchester, Marrakesh, Nantes, Naples, Nice, Porto, Prague, Pristina, Rabat, Rome–Fiumicino, Seville, Sharm El Sheikh, Tenerife–South, Toulouse, Venice; Seasonal: Agadir, Ajaccio, Bari, Bastia, Berlin, Brindisi, Bristol, Cagliari, Calvi, Catania, Chania, Corfu, Dubrovnik, Essaouira, Figari, Heraklion, Ibiza, Kos, London–Southend (begins 3 December 2026), Luxor (begins 31 October 2026), Menorca, Olbia, Palermo, Palma de Mallorca, Reykjavík, Rovaniemi, Split, Tangier
Emirates	Dubai–International
Ethiopian Airlines	Addis Ababa, Geneva (both begin 2 July 2026)
Eurowings	Düsseldorf
FlyOne	Chișinău; Seasonal: Yerevan
Iberia	Madrid
Jet2.com	Seasonal: Manchester
KLM	Amsterdam
KM Malta Airlines	Seasonal: Malta
LOT Polish Airlines	Warsaw–Chopin
Lufthansa	Frankfurt, Munich
Norwegian Air Shuttle	Seasonal: Oslo, Stockholm–Arlanda
Nouvelair	Djerba; Seasonal: Monastir, Tunis
Pegasus Airlines	Istanbul–Sabiha Gökçen, Kayseri
Royal Air Maroc	Casablanca, Marrakesh
Royal Jordanian	Amman–Queen Alia
Scandinavian Airlines	Copenhagen
Sky Express	Athens; Seasonal: Heraklion
Sundor	Tel Aviv
TAP Air Portugal	Lisbon
Transavia	Agadir, Algiers, Beirut, Béjaïa, Cairo, Casablanca, Constantine, Djerba, Dubai–Al Maktoum, Faro, Fès, Funchal, Istanbul, Jeddah, Málaga, Marrakesh, Medina, Monastir, Oran, Oujda, Paris Orly, Porto, Sal, Tel Aviv, Tunis; Seasonal: Ajaccio, Antalya, Athens, Bastia, Catania (begins 18 July 2026), Chania, Dakar–Diass, Gran Canaria, Heraklion, Hurghada, Ibiza, İzmir, Menorca, Mykonos (begins 16 July 2026), Palma de Mallorca, Paphos, Praia, Rhodes, Santorini, Seville, Stockholm–Arlanda, Tenerife–South, Tirana, Valencia, Yerevan
Tunisair	Djerba, Monastir, Tunis
Turkish Airlines	Istanbul
Twin Jet	Bologna, Milan–Malpensa, Pau, Strasbourg
Volotea	Alghero, Athens, Berlin, Fuerteventura, Gran Canaria, Hamburg, Lanzarote, Málaga, Nantes, Porto, Prague, Setif, Tenerife–South, Valencia, Venice; Seasonal: Ajaccio, Alicante, Bari, Bastia, Billund, Corfu, Faro, Figari, Florence, Heraklion, Madrid, Marrakesh, Menorca, Naples, Olbia, Palermo, Palma de Mallorca, Poitiers, Rhodes, Salerno, Split, Strasbourg
Vueling	Barcelona
Wizz Air	Bucharest–Otopeni, Cluj-Napoca, Kraków, Kutaisi, London–Luton, Skopje, Sofia, Tirana; Seasonal: London–Gatwick

=== Cargo ===
Airlines	Destinations
ASL Airlines France	Paris–Charles de Gaulle
Emirates SkyCargo	Dubai–Al Maktoum
UPS Airlines	Cologne/Bonn

== Ground transportation ==
=== Rail ===
The Rhônexpress tramway began operations in August 2010 and links Gare de Lyon-Part-Dieu east of Lyon's city centre with Gare de Lyon Saint-Exupéry next to the airport in approximately 30 minutes using and sharing existing tracks of the Lyon tramway as well as a newly constructed route. This tramway replaced the former coach shuttle services (Satobus) that operated beforehand leaving the airport with no other public connections to the city centre.

The Gare de Lyon Saint-Exupéry station is also served by the LGV Rhône-Alpes high speed rail line.

=== Coach ===
Coach links connect the airport with the centre of other towns in the area including Grenoble (at least once an hour), Saint-Étienne and Chambéry. Bus operators also offer a coach shuttle service to the surrounding French ski resorts, including Tignes, Val d'Isere, Val Thorens and more.

Since January 2020, two buses from Transports en commun lyonnais are stopping at the airport:
- The bus 47, from Meyzieu, connecting with Tram line 3 (from Gare Part-Dieu) to Saint-Laurent-de-Mure, connecting with Bus line 1E (from Grange Blanche) via the airport. The line operates 7 days a week, from 5:30am to 11:45pm, every 30 minutes.
- The bus 48, from Genas to the airport.

=== Electric car service ===
The airport has an electric car sharing station. Bolloré Bluecar vehicles are available for rent.

== See also ==
- Antoine de Saint Exupéry Airport (Argentina)
- List of the busiest airports in France
