= Menorca Airport =

Menorca Airport Aeroport de Menorca Aeropuerto de Menorca

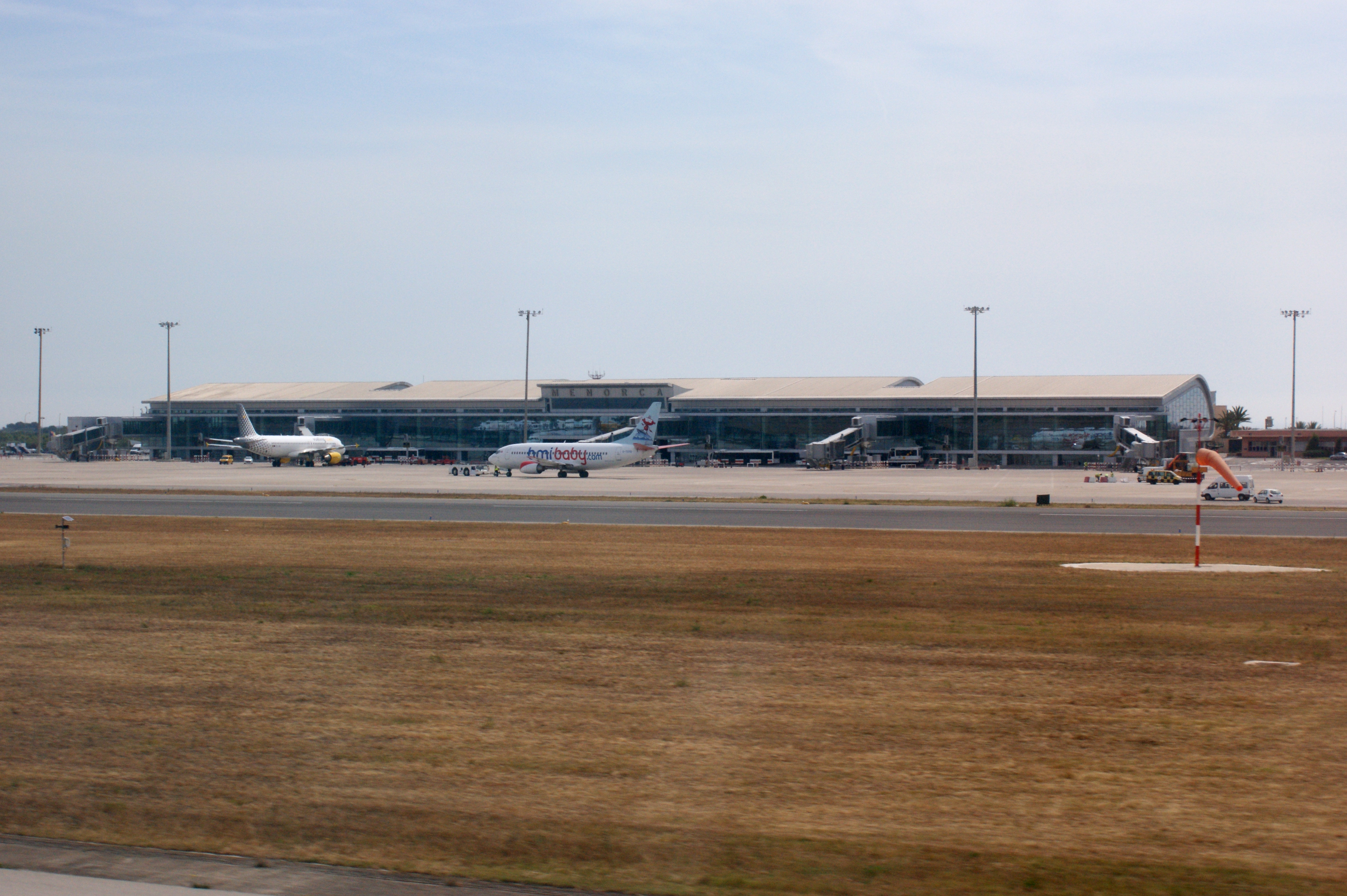
- IATA: MAH; ICAO: LEMH

Summary
- Airport type: Public
- Owner/Operator: AENA
- Serves: Menorca
- Location: Mahón, Spain
- Elevation AMSL: 92 m (302 ft)
- Coordinates: 39°51′45″N 004°13′07″E
- Website: aena.es

Map
- Location within Spain

Runways
Direction	Length		Surface
Direction	m	ft	Surface
01/19	2,550	8,366	Asphalt

Statistics (2020)
- Passengers: 1,076,952
- Passenger change 19-20: ▼69.2%
- Aircraft movements: 14,570
- Movements change 19-20: ▼53.9%
- Cargo (t): 966
- Cargo change 19-20: ▼22%
- Sources: Passenger Traffic, AENA; Spanish AIP, AENA

Menorca Airport (IATA: MAH, ICAO: LEMH; Catalan: Aeroport de Menorca, Spanish: Aeropuerto de Menorca), also known as Mahón Menorca Airport, is an international airport serving the island of Menorca, one of Spain's Balearic Islands in the Mediterranean Sea. The airport is located 4.5 km (2.8 mi) southwest of the city of Mahón. The airport is primarily used by charter and seasonal flights and is busiest during the April–October season. In 2019, the airport handled over 3 million passengers, making it the fifteenth busiest airport in the country that year.

== History ==
The first airfield on Menorca (San Luis Aerodrome) was constructed in the late 1930s during the Spanish Civil War, with an 850 metre runway. During the 1940s, the airfield was often used by planes coming from the neighbouring island of Mallorca and in 1949, Spain's Ministry of Aviation agreed to make San Luis a fully civilian airfield. In August 1949, the airfield's first inaugural flight landed from Barcelona, operated by Aviaco and using a Bristol 170 aircraft. During the late 1950s and early 60s, the runway was extended twice in order to accommodate the larger Douglas DC-4, which Aviaco had begun flying to San Luis. In September 1965, the airfield was officially renamed as Mahón Airport.

By the 1960s, with the increase in passenger traffic, came the demand for a new and larger airport to be built, with a longer runway to accommodate larger aircraft. In 1967, construction began on what is now the site of the current airport and, on 24 March 1969, the new airport known as Menorca Airport was officially opened. Since then, San Luis has primarily been used by light aircraft as a flying club.

Throughout the 1970s and 80s, passenger traffic continued to grow and, by 1986, the airport's passenger numbers had exceeded 1 million per year. This then prompted the construction of the airport's current terminal in 1987, which opened to the public in May 1988. Due to the continual rise in passenger numbers, the airport was further expanded and refurbished several times during the 1990s and 2000s, opening in its current form in 2008.

On 17 April 2024, AENA released a planification for several airports to be expanded throughout the years 2027 to 2031. One of the airports referenced by AENA to be expanded was Menorca Airport.

== Terminal ==
Menorca Airport currently has 42 check-in desks, 16 departure gates (5 with airbridges) and 6 baggage claim carousels. On 14 September 2006 a partial roof collapse occurred in the new part of the terminal undergoing construction work. The collapse may have been caused by a build-up of heavy rainwater. The debris temporarily trapped 20 and injured 3 workers. In 2016, for the first time, the annual passenger volume processed through the airport exceeded 3 million.

== Airlines and destinations ==
=== Passenger ===
Airlines	Destinations
Air Nostrum	Seasonal: Alicante; Seasonal charter: Porto
Air Serbia	Seasonal: Belgrade (begins 16 June 2027)
Austrian Airlines	Seasonal: Vienna
Binter Canarias	Seasonal: Gran Canaria
British Airways	Seasonal: London–Gatwick
Discover Airlines	Seasonal: Frankfurt, Munich
easyJet	London–Gatwick; Seasonal: Basel/Mulhouse, Belfast–International, Berlin, Bordeaux, Bristol, Geneva, Lisbon, London–Luton, Lyon, Manchester, Milan–Malpensa, Nantes, Naples, Paris–Charles de Gaulle, Porto
Edelweiss Air	Seasonal: Zurich
Eurowings	Seasonal: Cologne/Bonn, Düsseldorf
Iberia	Madrid; Seasonal: Ibiza, León, Palma de Mallorca, Valencia, Zaragoza
ITA Airways	Seasonal: Milan–Linate, Rome–Fiumicino
Jet2.com	Seasonal: Belfast–International, Birmingham, Bournemouth, Bristol, East Midlands, Edinburgh, Glasgow, Leeds/Bradford, Liverpool, London–Gatwick, London–Luton, London–Stansted, Manchester, Newcastle upon Tyne
Lufthansa	Seasonal: Munich
Luxair	Seasonal: Luxembourg
Neos	Seasonal: Bologna, Milan-Bergamo, Milan–Malpensa, Verona
Ryanair	Barcelona, Málaga; Seasonal: Alicante, Bologna, Bordeaux, Charleroi, Dublin, East Midlands, London–Stansted, Madrid, Manchester, Marseille, Milan-Bergamo, Naples, Rome–Fiumicino, Seville, Toulouse, Valencia, Venice Treviso
Scandinavian Airlines	Seasonal: Copenhagen (begins 30 June 2027); Seasonal charter: Oslo
SkyAlps	Seasonal: Bolzano
Smartwings	Seasonal: Prague; Seasonal charter: Porto
TAP Air Portugal	Seasonal: Lisbon
Transavia	Seasonal: Amsterdam, Lyon, Nantes, Paris–Orly
TUI Airways	Seasonal: Birmingham, Bournemouth, Cardiff, East Midlands, Exeter, Glasgow, London–Gatwick, London–Stansted, Manchester, Newcastle upon Tyne, Norwich
TUI fly Belgium	Seasonal: Brussels
TUI fly Deutschland	Seasonal: Düsseldorf, Frankfurt, Hannover, Munich, Stuttgart
Volotea	Seasonal: Asturias, Bilbao, Brest, Bordeaux, Lille, Lyon, Marseille, Montpellier, Nantes, San Sebastián, Zaragoza
Vueling	Barcelona; Seasonal: Bilbao, (suspended until 19 March 2027) Florence, Paris–Orly, Seville
Wizz Air	Seasonal: Rome–Fiumicino, Warsaw–Chopin

=== Cargo ===
Airlines	Destinations
Swiftair	Barcelona, Palma de Mallorca

== Statistics ==
Menorca airport annual passenger since 2000 (millions)
Updated: 16 December 2025.

	Passengers	Aircraft movements	Cargo (tonnes)
2000	2,772,337	32,348	4,528
2001	2,825,147	32,787	4,206
2002	2,733,733	32,259	3,954
2003	2,704,838	32,288	3,705
2004	2,631,334	29,538	3,975
2005	2,590,733	29,428	3,829
2006	2,690,992	32,921	3,686
2007	2,776,458	33,802	3,668
2008	2,605,932	31,804	3,244
2009	2,433,666	28,189	2,621
2010	2,511,629	28,358	2,400
2011	2,576,200	28,042	2,070
2012	2,545,942	25,533	1,793
2013	2,565,462	24,419	1,636
2014	2,632,615	24,716	1,422
2015	2,867,521	28,687	1,502
2016	3,178,284	31,252	1,391
2017	3,434,615	30,293	1,374
2018	3,442,742	31,370	1,221
2019	3,495,025	31,594	1,238
2020	1,076,952	14,570	0,97
2021	2,325,323	26,134	0,88
2022	3,900,935	36,070	0,77
2023	4,045,211	35,667	0,69
2024	4,172,691	36,949	0,60
Source: Aena Statistics

=== Busiest routes ===
Busiest international routes from MAH (2023)
Rank	Destination	Passengers	Change 2022/23
1	London-Gatwick	249,466	▲8%
2	Manchester	155,703	▲7%
3	Paris-Orly	111,950	▲3%
4	London-Stansted	96,706	▼5%
5	Milan-Malpensa	80,547	▼8%
6	Birmingham	78,683	▲7%
7	Bristol	74,038	▲12%
8	East Midlands	68,329	▲19%
9	Marseille	53,586	▲20%
10	Toulouse	45,958	▲24%
11	London-Luton	44,511	▲35%
12	Newcastle	43,392	▼30%
13	Lyon	41,615	▲113%
14	Bordeaux	37,392	▲39%
15	Lisbon	34,978	▲342%
16	Leeds/Bradford	33,452	▲5%
17	Düsseldorf	31,235	▼3%
18	Bergamo	29,633	▲24%
19	Bologna	26,931	▲24%
20	Nantes	26,431	▲2%
Source: Estadísticas de tráfico aereo

Busiest Spanish routes from MAH (2023)
Rank	Destination	Passengers	Change 2022/23
1	Barcelona	932,959	▲10%
2	Palma de Mallorca	391,644	▲8%
3	Madrid	371,913	▲11%
4	Bilbao	139,275	▲4%
5	Valencia	136,050	▲10%
6	Málaga	38,066	▼7%
7	Alicante	27,292	▼44%
8	Seville	23,939	▼50%
9	Asturias	23,466	▼16%
10	Zaragoza	18,392	▼4%
11	Santiago de Compostela	12,347	▼53%
12	Ibiza	11,429	▲17%
13	A Coruña	11,281	▲11%
14	San Sebastián	10,628	▲4%
15	Murcia	8,937	▲1%
16	Gran Canaria	4,910	▲52%
17	Santander	4,860	▲2%
18	Vigo	2,533	▲72%
19	León	1,326	▼10%
20	Girona	1,233	New route
Source: Estadísticas de tráfico aereo

=== Passengers by airline ===
Passengers by airline at MAH (2023)
Rank	Airline	Share	Passengers	Change 2022/23
1	Vueling	24.4%	985,768	▲1%
2	Ryanair	18.5%	750,273	▼3%
3	Iberia	15.9%	642,890	▲16%
4	EasyJet	10.8%	436,289	▲2%
5	Jet2.com	8.0%	322,167	▲7%
6	TUI Airways	6.4%	259,110	▲3%
7	Volotea	4.3%	172,505	▲10%
8	Transavia	2.2%	90,621	▲1%
9	TUI fly Deutschland	1.6%	64,694	▲4%
10	British Airways	1.3%	54,294	▲42%
11	Neos	1.3%	53,495	▲4%
12	Eurowings	0.7%	29,884	▲17%
13	Air Europa	0.6%	23,801	▼55%
14	Uep Fly	0.5%	22,258	▼12%
15	Smartwings	0.5%	19,096	▼13%
16	Edelweiss Air	0.3%	13,796	▲25%
17	TAP Air Portugal	0.3%	13,001	New airline
18	TUI fly Belgium	0.3%	11,189	▲17%
19	Luxair	0.3%	10,713	▼14%
20	Lufthansa	0.2%	9,224	▼32%
Source: Estadísticas de tráfico aereo

=== Passengers by country ===
Passengers by country at PMI (2023)
Rank	Airline	Share	Passengers	Change 2022/23
1	Spain	53.8%	2,174,522	▲5%
2	United Kingdom	23.6%	955,803	▲3%
3	France	8.5%	344,749	▲16%
4	Italy	5.3%	212,619	▼20%
5	Germany	3.0%	119,641	▲5%
6	Portugal	1.5%	60,378	▲147%
7	Switzerland	1.3%	52,637	▼10%
8	Belgium	0.7%	26,905	▲9%
9	Poland	0.6%	25,709	▲11%
10	Netherlands	0.6%	23,847	0%
11	Ireland	0.4%	14,638	▼28%
12	Czech Republic	0.3%	13,478	▲5%
13	Luxembourg	0.3%	10,727	▼14%
14	Slovakia	0.1%	5,682	▲1%
15	Austria	0.1%	3,411	▼88%
Source: Estadísticas de tráfico aereo

== Ground transportation ==
Menorca Airport is served by bus route 10 linking it with the Mahón central bus station. Services run Monday to Sunday from approximately 0600 to 2245 in both directions, with the exact timetable and frequencies varying throughout the year to essentially reflect tourism-related demand. The trip's duration is 10 minutes. The service is operated by Torres Allés Autocares on behalf of local authorities.
