= Zenata – Messali El Hadj Airport =

Airport serving Tclemen, Algeria

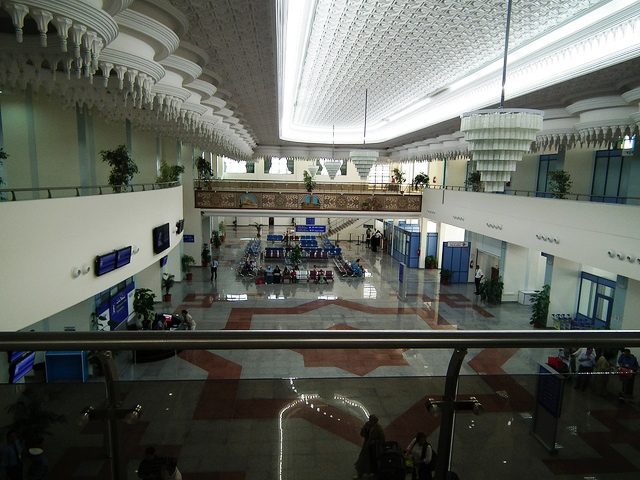
- IATA: TLM; ICAO: DAON

Summary
- Airport type: Public
- Serves: Tlemcen, Remchi
- Elevation AMSL: 248 m (814 ft)
- Coordinates: 35°0′45″N 1°27′25″W

Map
- Location of airport in Algeria

Runways
Direction	Length		Surface
Direction	m	ft	Surface
07/25	2,600	8,530	Asphalt

Statistics (2010)
- Passengers: 137,907
- Passenger change 09–10: ▼6.8%
- Aircraft movements: 2,206
- Movements change 09–10: ▼6.0%
- Sources: Algerian AIP, DAFIF Landings.com, ACI's 2010 World Airport Traffic Report.

Zenata – Messali El Hadj Airport (IATA: TLM, ICAO: DAON) is a public airport located 17 kilometres (11 mi) northwest of Tlemcen, the capital of the Tlemcen province (wilaya) in Algeria.

== Facilities ==
The airport resides at an elevation of 248 metres (814 ft) above mean sea level. It has one runway designated 07/25 with an asphalt surface measuring 2,600 by 45 metres (8,530 ft × 148 ft).

== Airlines and destinations ==
The following airlines operate regular scheduled and charter flights at Tlemcen Airport:

Airlines	Destinations
Air Algérie	Algiers; Seasonal: Lyon, Marseille, Paris–Charles de Gaulle, Paris–Orly
ASL Airlines France	Seasonal: Lille
Transavia	Paris–Orly; Seasonal: Lyon
TUI fly Belgium	Brussels
Volotea	Marseille

== Statistics ==
Traffic by calendar year. Official ACI Statistics
	Pass- engers	Change from previous year	Aircraft opera- tions	Change from previous year	Cargo (metric tons)	Change from previous year
2005	131,481	▲10.07%	2,677	▲23.31%	112	▼30.86%
2006	130,546	▼0.71%	2,328	▼13.04%	111	▼0.89%
2007	69,333	▼46.89%	1,207	▼48.15%	27	▼75.68%
2008	128,851	▲85.84%	2,050	▲69.84%	56	▲107.41%
2009	147,919	▲14.80%	2,347	▲14.49%	53	▼5.36%
2010	137,907	▼6.77%	2,206	▼6.01%	72	▲35.85%
Source: Airports Council International. World Airport Traffic Reports (Years 2005, 2006, 2007, 2009 and 2010)
