= Rabah Bitat Airport =

Annaba Rabah Bitat Airport مطار عنابة - رابح بيطاط (Arabic)
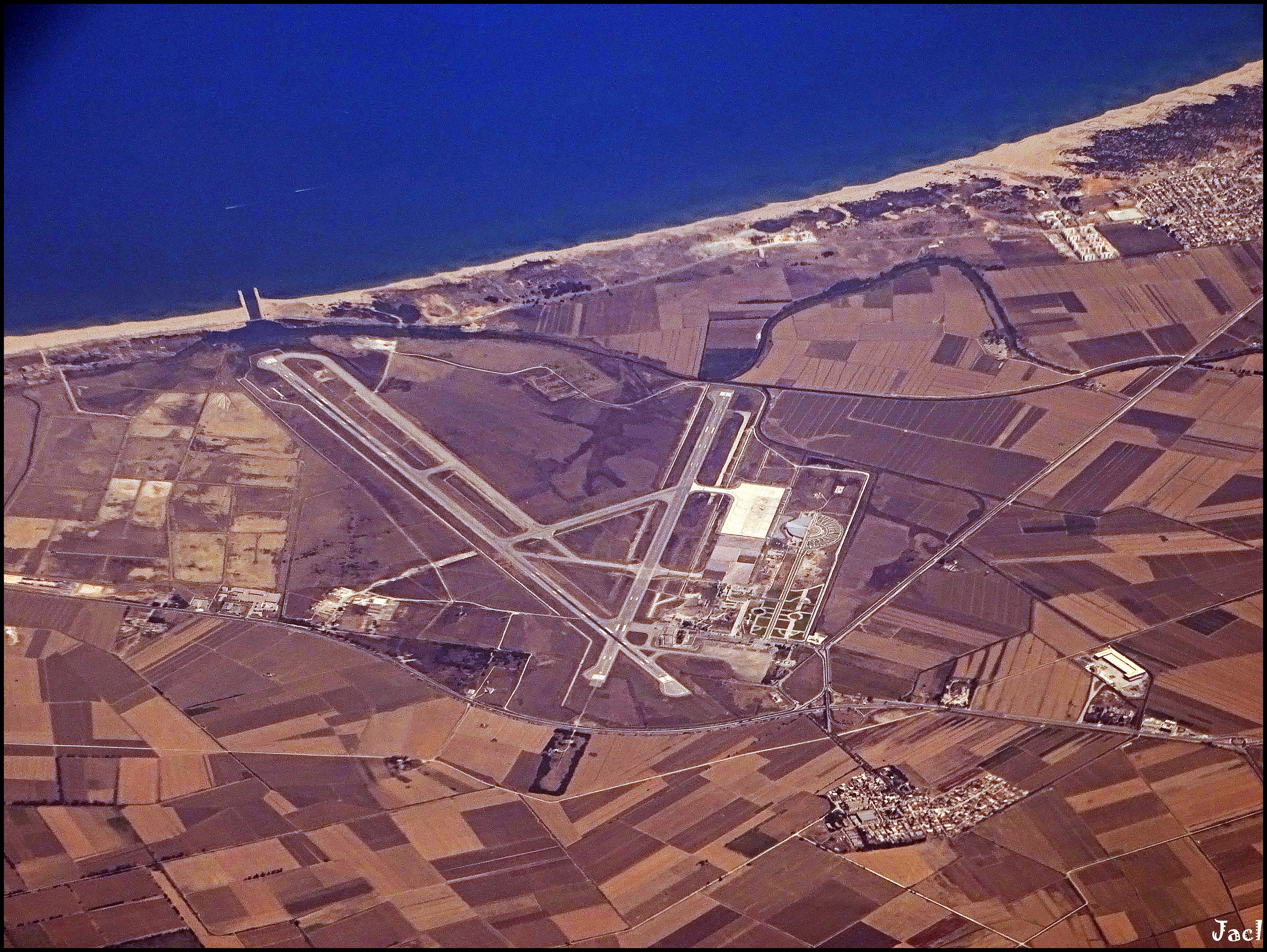
- IATA: AAE; ICAO: DABB

Summary
- Airport type: Public
- Operator: EGSA-Constantine
- Serves: Annaba, Algeria
- Elevation AMSL: 5 m (16 ft)
- Coordinates: 36°49′45″N 7°48′50″E

Map
- Location of airport in Algeria

Runways
Direction	Length		Surface
Direction	m	ft	Surface
01/19	3,000	9,843	Asphalt
05/23	2,290	7,513	Asphalt

Statistics (2020)
- Passenger volume: 105,229
- Sources: AIP DAFIF, ACI's 2013 World Airport Traffic Report.

Annaba Rabah Bitat Airport (IATA: AAE, ICAO: DABB), formerly known as Les Salines Airport, and popularly as El Mellah Airport is an international airport located 9 km (5.6 mi) south of Annaba, a city in Algeria. It is named after Rabah Bitat, a president of Algeria (1978–1979).

== History ==
During the era of French colonization in Algeria, the airport was named Bône-les-Salines, in reference to the salt lakes in the vicinity of the site.

It was put into operation in 1939, and a decree of 16 December 1958, entrusted the operation to the Chamber of Commerce of Bône.

=== World War II ===
During World War II, the airport was known as Bone Airfield,

In November 1942, the Allies invaded French Morocco and Algeria (Operation Torch). The British airborne operations in North Africa started on 12 November, when the 3rd Battalion, Parachute Regiment carried out the first battalion sized parachute drop on Bone airfield. The remainder of the 1st Parachute Brigade arrived by sea the next day. Bone Airfield was the base of No. 111 Squadron RAF, a Supermarine Spitfire squadron under Squadron Leader Tony Bartley. One notable pilot to fly from Bone on occasion was Wing Commander Adrian Warburton who was an infrequent visitor after crash landing there on 15 November 1942. 81 Squadron were based at Bone from 16 November to 31 January 1942 with 'Ras' Berry DSO DFC and then Colin F Gray DSO DFC being Squadron Leaders. Alan M Peart DFC also claimed his first aerial combat victory as well as two further aircraft damaged over Bone Harbour during this time.

=== Algerian war ===
After the war, the air base 213 one of the air bases of the French Air Force, was established on the site at that time. It was home to the 1/91 Gascogne Bombardment Group, a unit recreated on 1 September 1956 (and temporarily dissolved on 17 September 1962, after the Algerian War), which was equipped with Douglas B-26 Invaders.

=== Post-war period ===
After Algerian independence and until 2000, Annaba airport was named El-Mellaha (meaning in Arabic "Les Salines").

Since then, the airport has been named in honor of Rabah Bitat, former head of the Algerian state.

== Facilities ==
The old terminal had an annual capacity of 500,000 passengers. In January 2016, the new international terminal was opened. The new terminal, which on commissioning generated 300 jobs, has an expandable capacity of 700,000 passengers per year.

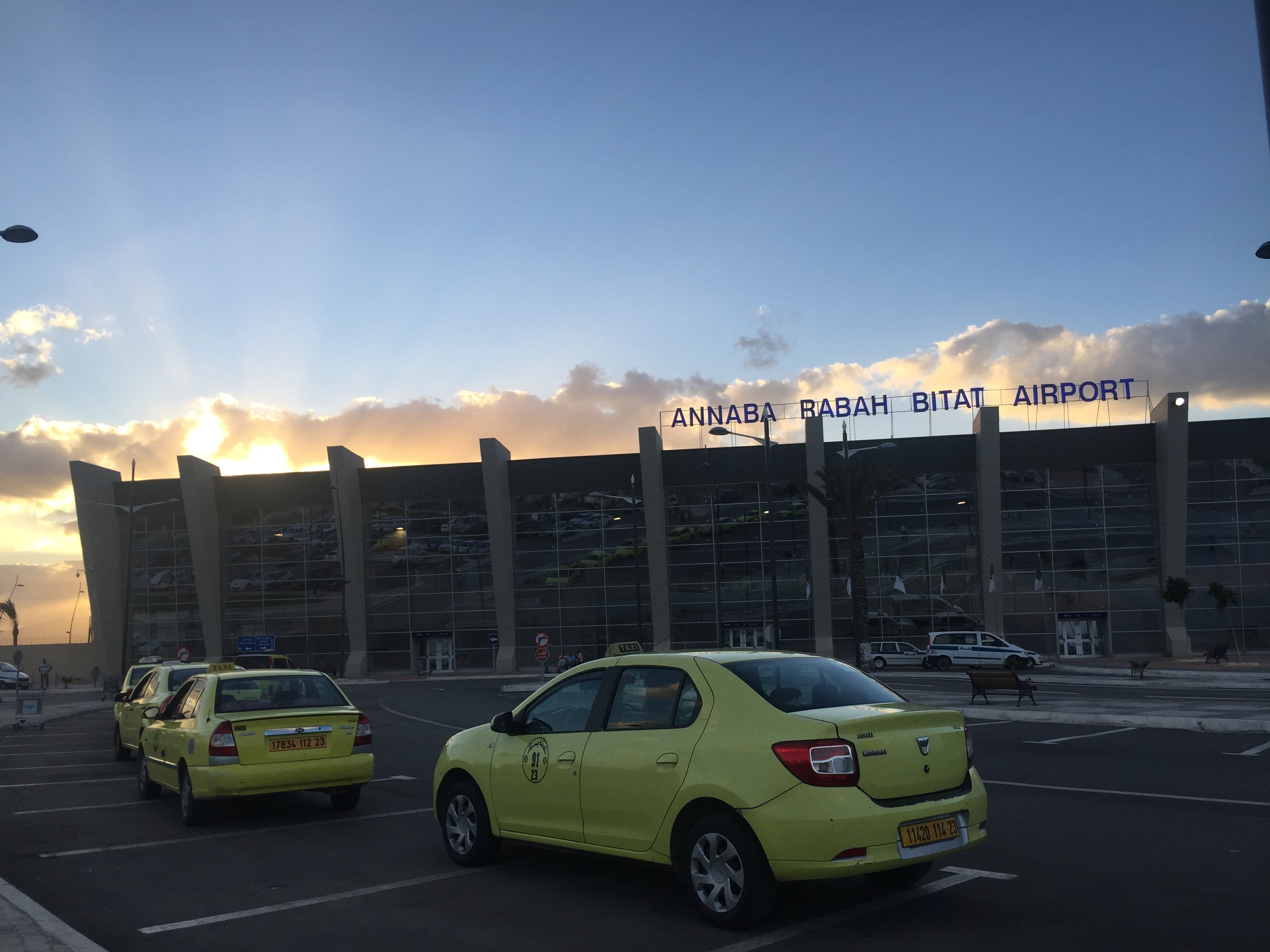
Terminal of the airport.

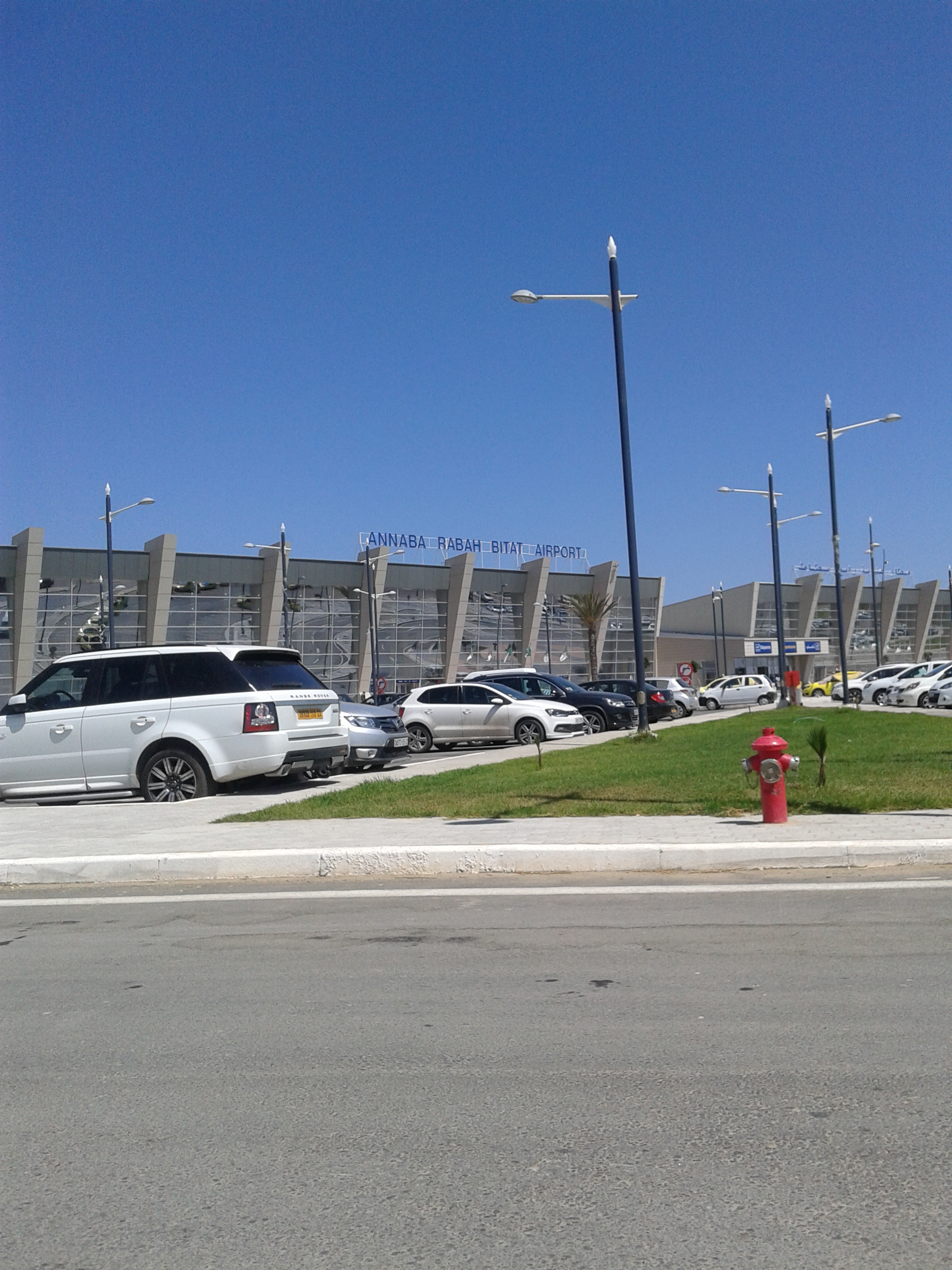
Terminal of the airport

== Airlines and destinations ==
The following airlines operate regular scheduled and charter flights at Rabah Bitat Airport:

Airlines	Destinations
Air Algérie	Algiers, Istanbul, Lyon, Marseille, Oran, Paris–Charles de Gaulle, Paris–Orly
ASL Airlines France	Seasonal: Paris–Charles de Gaulle
Tassili Airlines	Algiers, El Oued, Hassi Messaoud
Transavia	Seasonal: Marseille
Volotea	Seasonal: Marseille

== Statistics ==
The evolution of air traffic at Annaba airport between 2006 and 2020 is:

Traffic	Year	2006	2007	2008	2009	2010	2011	2012	2013	2014	2015	2016	2017	2018	2019	2020
Traffic	Total	362 303	372 244	386 607	416 435	402 585	421 547	446 846	462 003	473 530	489 739	530 709	553 349	520 493	515 481	105 229
