= Mostépha Ben Boulaid Airport =

Mostépha Ben Boulaid Airport مطار باتنة - مصطفى بن بولعيد (Arabic)
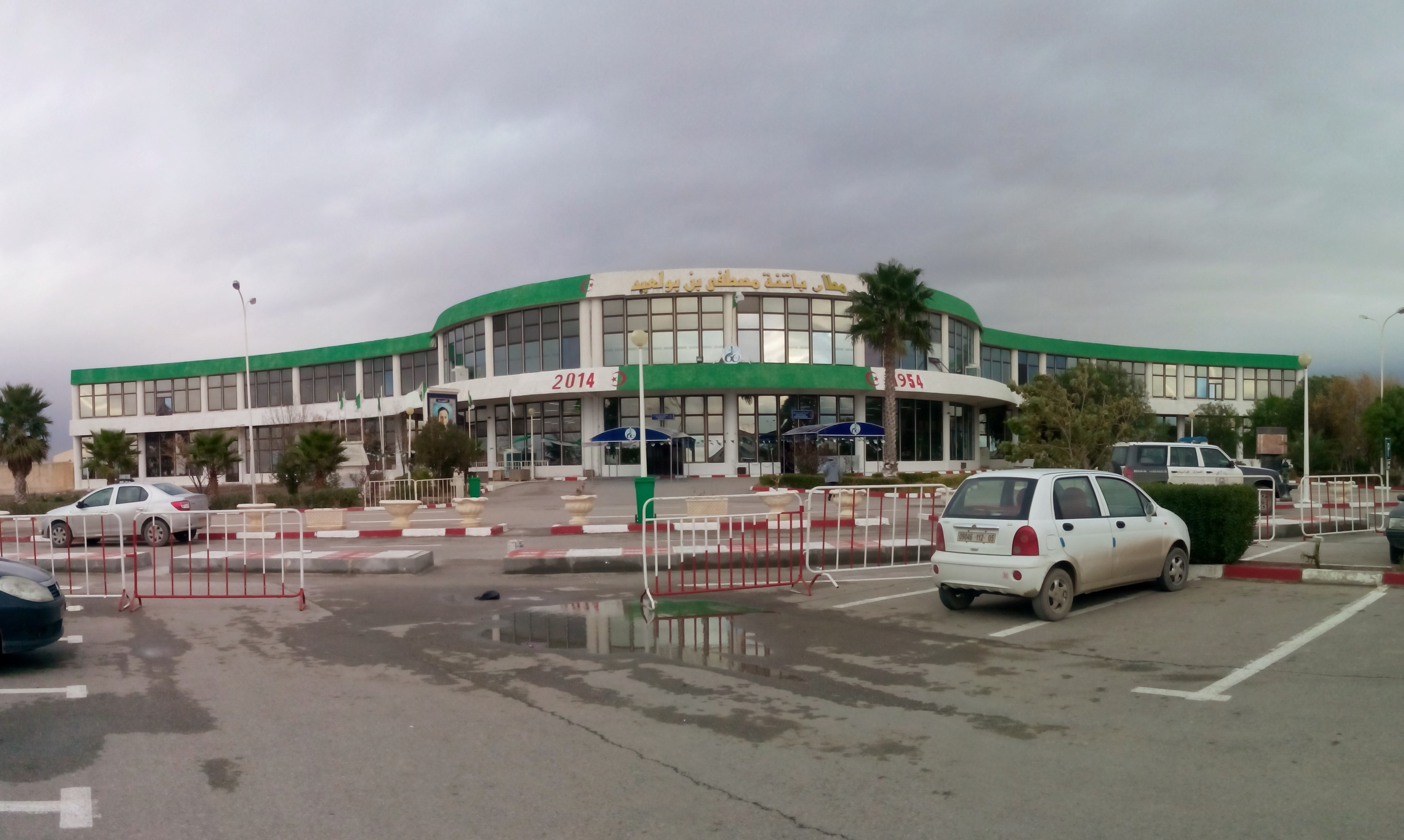
- IATA: BLJ; ICAO: DABT

Summary
- Airport type: Public
- Operator: EGSA Alger
- Serves: Batna
- Location: Batna, Algeria
- Elevation AMSL: 823 m / 3,445 ft
- Coordinates: 35°45′5″N 6°18′30″E

Map
- Location of airport in Algeria

Runways
Direction	Length		Surface
Direction	m	ft	Surface
05/23	3,000	9,845	Asphalt

Statistics (2020)
- Passenger volume: 13,692
- Source: Algerian AIP Landings.com, ACI's 2013 World Airport Traffic Report

Mostépha Ben Boulaid Airport (IATA: BLJ, ICAO: DABT), also known as Batna International Airport or Batna Airport, is an airport serving Batna, Algeria. The airport is situated 26 kilometres (16 mi) north of the city within the municipality of Lazrou.

== Airlines and destinations ==
Airlines	Destinations
Air Algérie	Algiers, Lyon, Marseille, Paris–Orly; Seasonal: Paris–Charles de Gaulle
