= Bastia–Poretta Airport =

Airport serving Bastia, Corsica, France

Bastia–Poretta Airport Aéroport de Bastia Poretta Aeroportu di Bastia Poreta
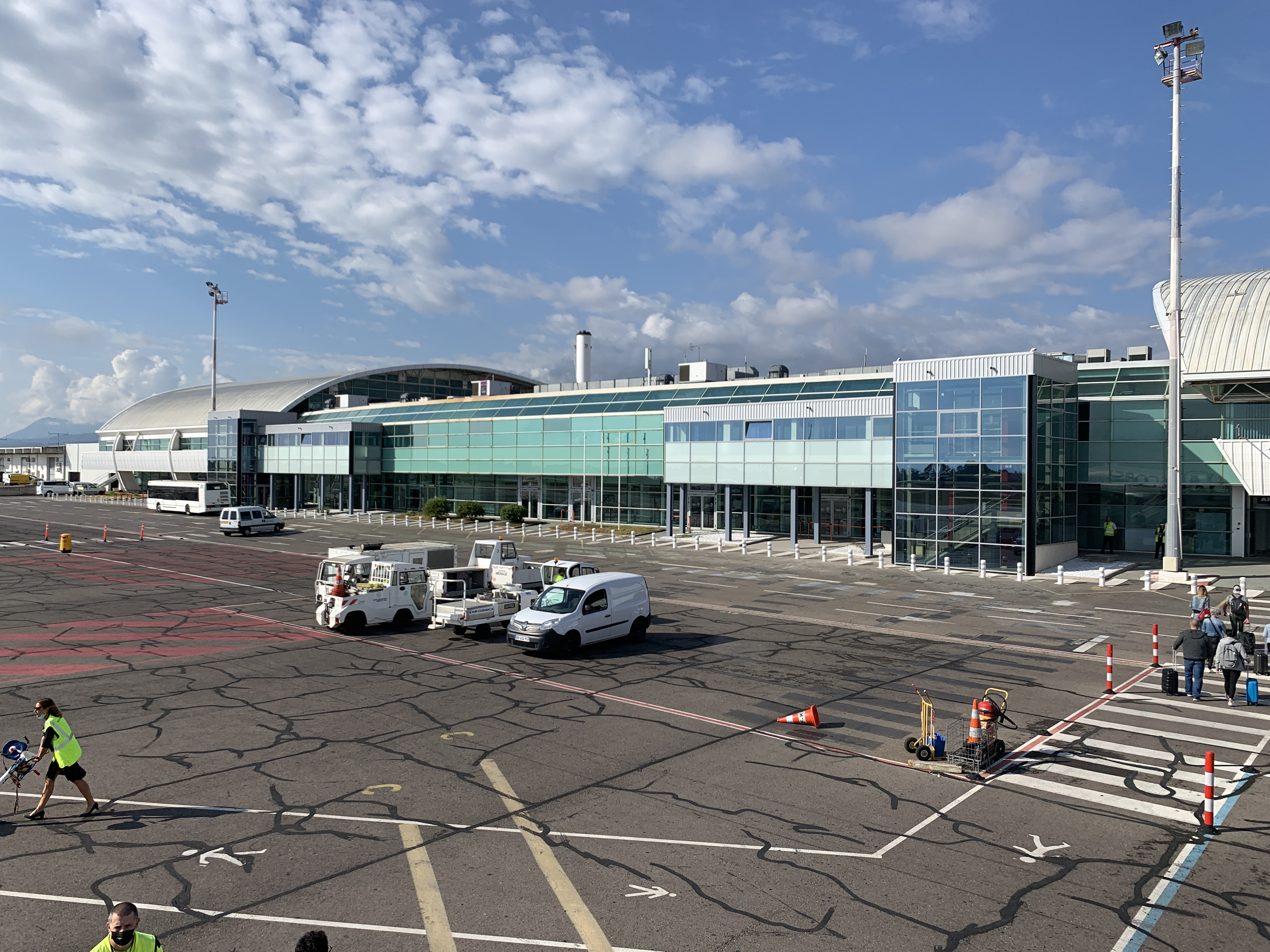
- IATA: BIA; ICAO: LFKB

Summary
- Airport type: Public
- Operator: CCI of Bastia and Upper Corsica
- Serves: Bastia
- Location: Lucciana, Corsica, France
- Elevation AMSL: 26 ft (7.9 m)
- Coordinates: 42°33′00″N 009°29′05″E
- Website: bastia.aeroport.fr

Map
- Location of the airport in Corsica LFKB (France)

Runways
Direction	Length		Surface
Direction	m	ft	Surface
16/34	2,520	8,268	Asphalt

Statistics (2022)
- Passengers: 1,489,038
- Passenger traffic change: ▲24.1%
- Source: French AIP, Aeroport.fr

Bastia–Poretta Airport (Note: French: Aéroport de Bastia Poretta, Corsican: Aeroportu di Bastia Poreta) (IATA: BIA, ICAO: LFKB) is an airport serving Bastia on the French Mediterranean island of Corsica. It is located 17 km (11 mi) south-southeast of Bastia at Lucciana, both of which are communes of the Upper Corsica department.

== History ==
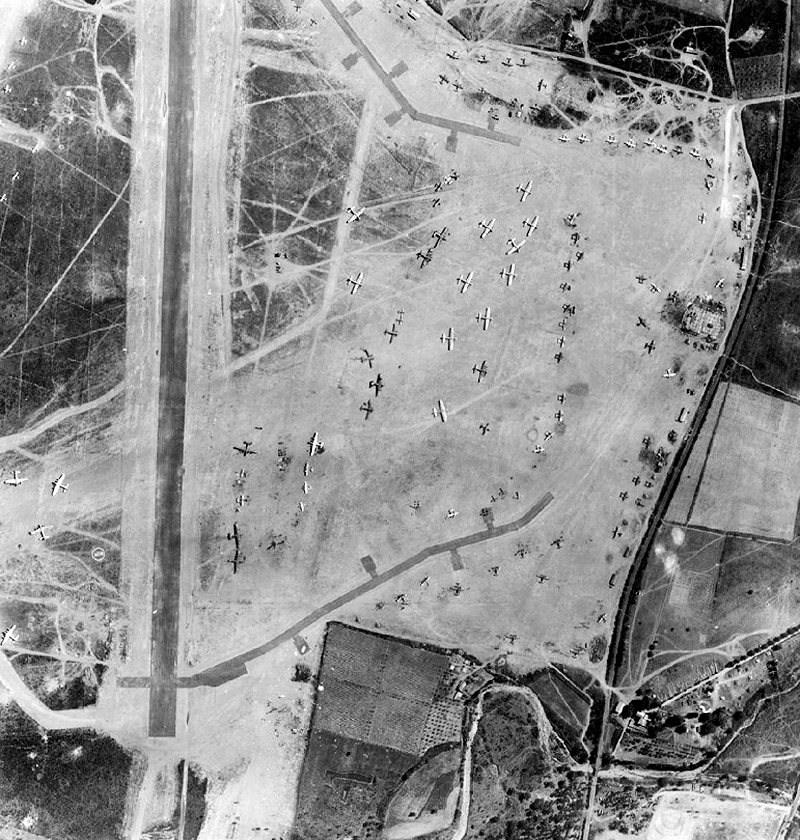
Airphoto of Borgo Airfield, 15 August 1944. Note the large number of B-17s on the parking apron, probably used during the Invasion of Southern France.

In 1944, during World War II, the airport was used by the United States Army Air Forces Twelfth Air Force. On 31 July 1944, Antoine de Saint-Exupéry, the legendary French pilot, took off from this airport and disappeared, on a reconnaissance flight over France in a Lockheed P-38 Lightning.

USAAF combat units assigned:

- 414th Night Fighter Squadron, (Twelfth Air Force), 5 February–July 1944; 5 September – 13 October 1944, Bristol Beaufighter
- 527th Fighter Squadron, 86th Fighter Group, (Twelfth Air Force), 12 July-23 September 1944, P-47 Thunderbolt
- 416th Night Fighter Squadron, (Twelfth Air Force), 14–23 August 1944, P-61 Black Widow
- 417th Night Fighter Squadron, (Twelfth Air Force), February–April 1944; 25 April – 7 September 1944, Bristol Beaufighter
- 5th Photographic Reconnaissance Squadron, (3d Reconnaissance Group), 11 July – 24 September 1944, P-38/F-5 Lightning
- 23rd Photographic Reconnaissance Squadron, (3d Reconnaissance Group), 11 July – 24 September 1944, P-38/F-5 Lightning
- 111th Tactical Reconnaissance Squadron, (XII Tactical Air Command), 21 July – 27 August 1944, P-51/F-6 Mustang
- 42nd Bombardment Wing was headquartered at the airfield, 21 September – 24 November 1944.
- 47th Bomb Group (Light) http://www.47thbombgroup.org/ 12 July - 5 September 1944, Douglas A-20, Douglas A-20 Havoc - Wikipedia and A-26 Douglas A-26 Invader - Wikipedia

== Airlines and destinations ==
The following airlines operate regular scheduled and charter flights at Bastia – Poretta airport:

Airlines	Destinations
Air Corsica	Ajaccio, Lyon, Marseille, Nice, Paris–Orly, Toulouse; Seasonal: Bordeaux (begins 1 November 2026), Brussels-Charleroi, Dole, Rome–Fiumicino, Nantes (begins 1 November 2026), Rennes, Strasbourg (begins 1 November 2026), Toulon
Air France	Paris–Orly
Aurigny	Seasonal: Guernsey
Austrian Airlines	Seasonal: Vienna
easyJet	Seasonal: Basel/Mulhouse, Bordeaux, Geneva, London–Gatwick, Lyon
Eurowings	Seasonal: Berlin, Cologne/Bonn, Düsseldorf, Hannover, Nuremberg, Stuttgart
Lufthansa	Seasonal: Frankfurt, Munich
Luxair	Seasonal: Luxembourg
Norwegian Air Shuttle	Seasonal: Copenhagen, Stockholm–Arlanda
Transavia	Seasonal: Biarritz, Brest, Gothenburg, Lyon, Montpellier, Oujda, Rotterdam/The Hague
Volotea	Seasonal: Bordeaux, Brest, Caen, Lille, Lyon, Nantes, Montpellier, Rodez, Paris-Beauvais, Strasbourg, Toulouse
