= Marseille Provence Airport =

International airport serving Marseille, France

Marseille Provence Airport Aéroport Marseille-Provence Advanced Landing Ground (ALG) Y-14

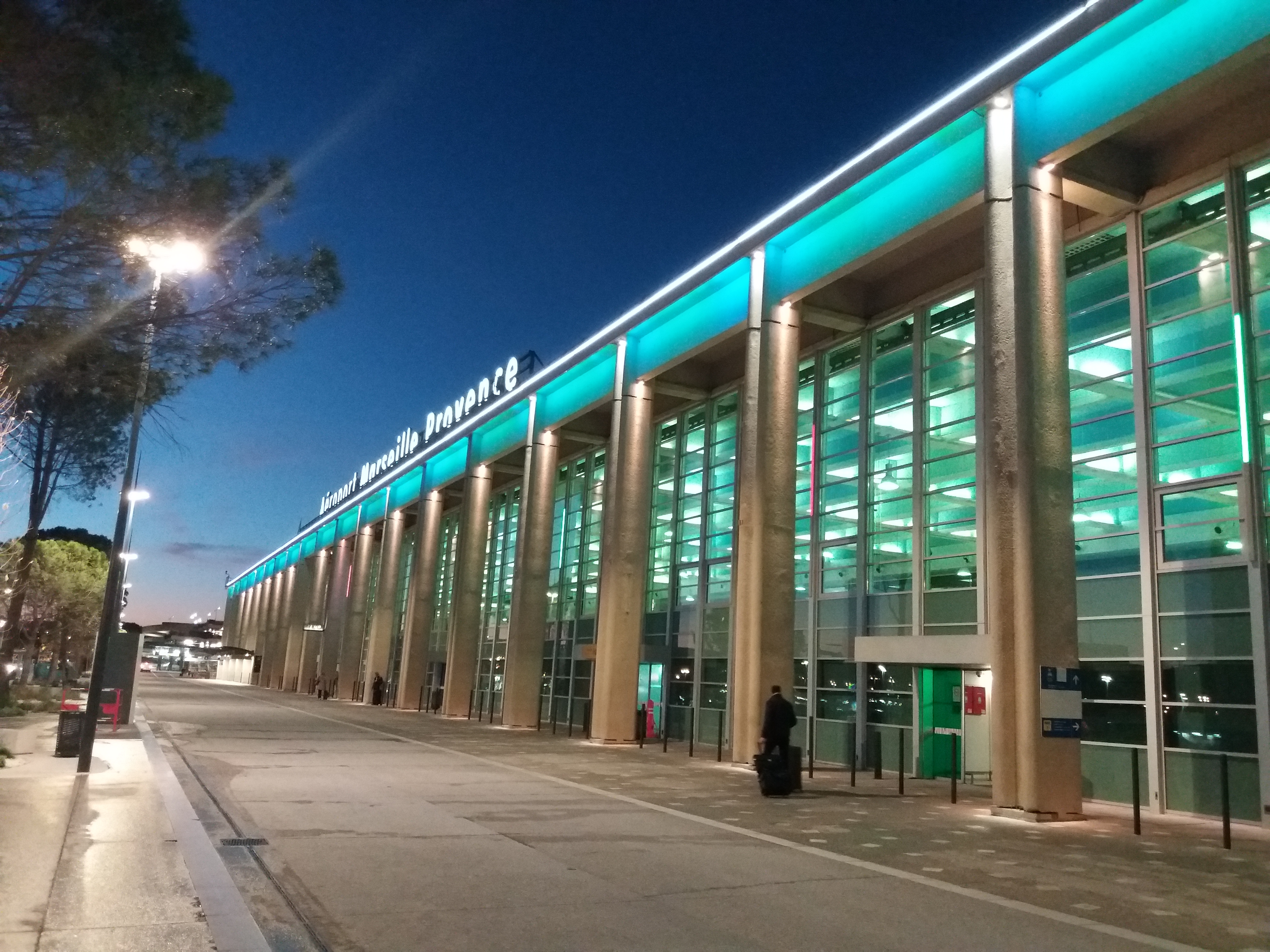
- IATA: MRS; ICAO: LFML

Summary
- Airport type: Public
- Operator: Marseille Provence Chamber of Commerce and Industry
- Serves: Marseille
- Location: Marignane, Bouches-du-Rhône, France
- Opened: 22 October 1922; 104 years ago
- Focus city for: Air France
- Operating base for: Ryanair
- Elevation AMSL: 70 ft (21 m)
- Coordinates: 43°26′12″N 05°12′54″E
- Website: marseille-airport.com

Map
- Airport in Provence-Alpes-Côte d'Azur region MRS/LFML (France)

Runways
| Direction | Length | | Surface |
| Direction | m | ft | Surface |
|---|---|---|---|
| 13L/31R | 3,500 | 11,483 | Asphalt |
| 13R/31L | 2,370 | 7,776 | Asphalt |

Statistics (2023)
- Passengers: 10,800,254
- Passenger change 22-23: ▲18.1%
- Freight (tons): 56,132
- Sources: French

Marseille Provence Airport (French: Aéroport Marseille-Provence; Occitan: Aeroport de Marselha-Provença; IATA: MRS, ICAO: LFML) is an international airport located 27 kilometres (17 mi) northwest of Marseille, on the territory of Marignane, both communes of the Bouches-du-Rhône department in the Provence-Alpes-Côte d'Azur region of France. The airport's hinterland goes from Gap to Arles and from Toulon to Avignon.

== History ==
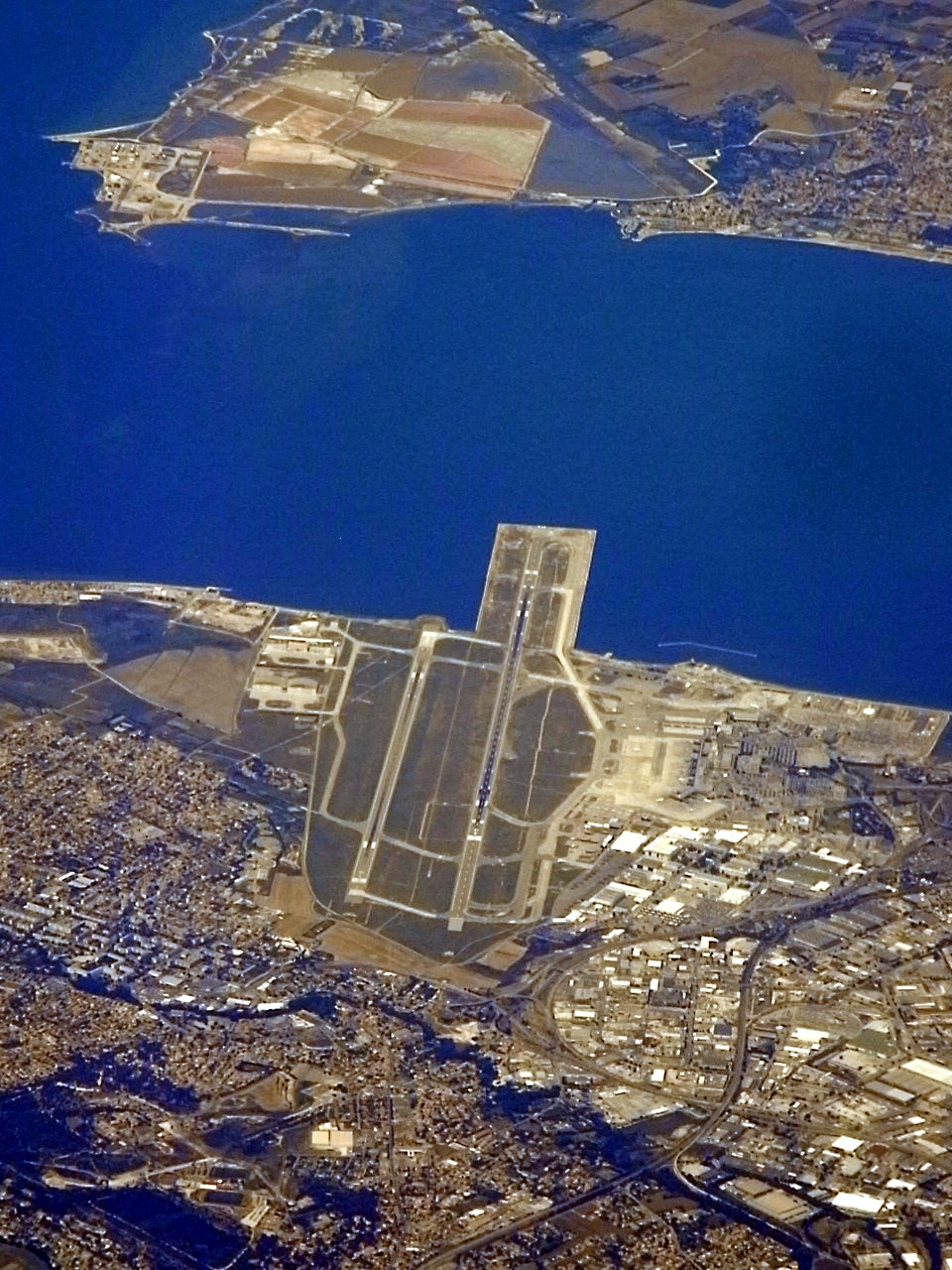
Aerial view

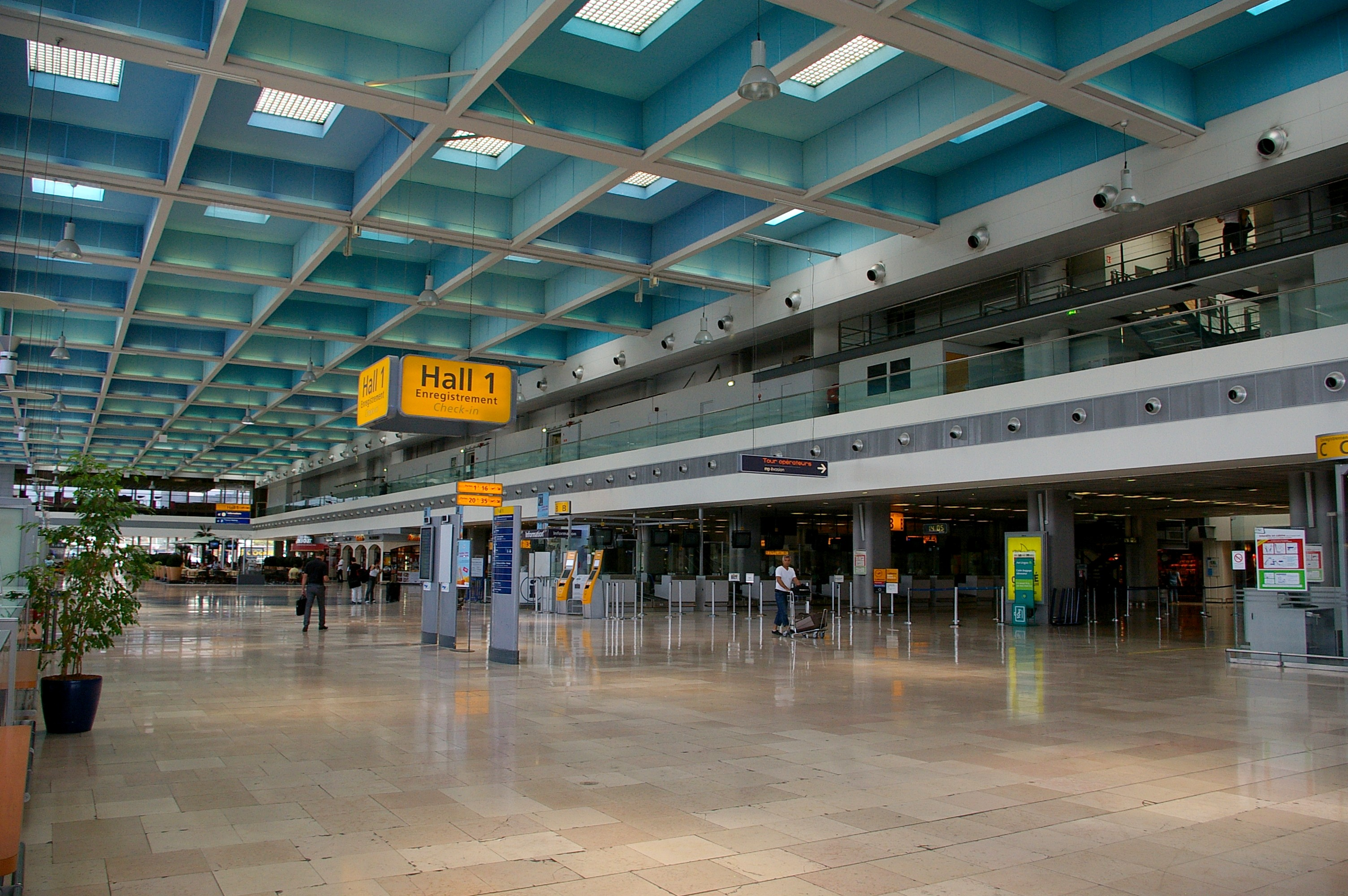
Check-in hall

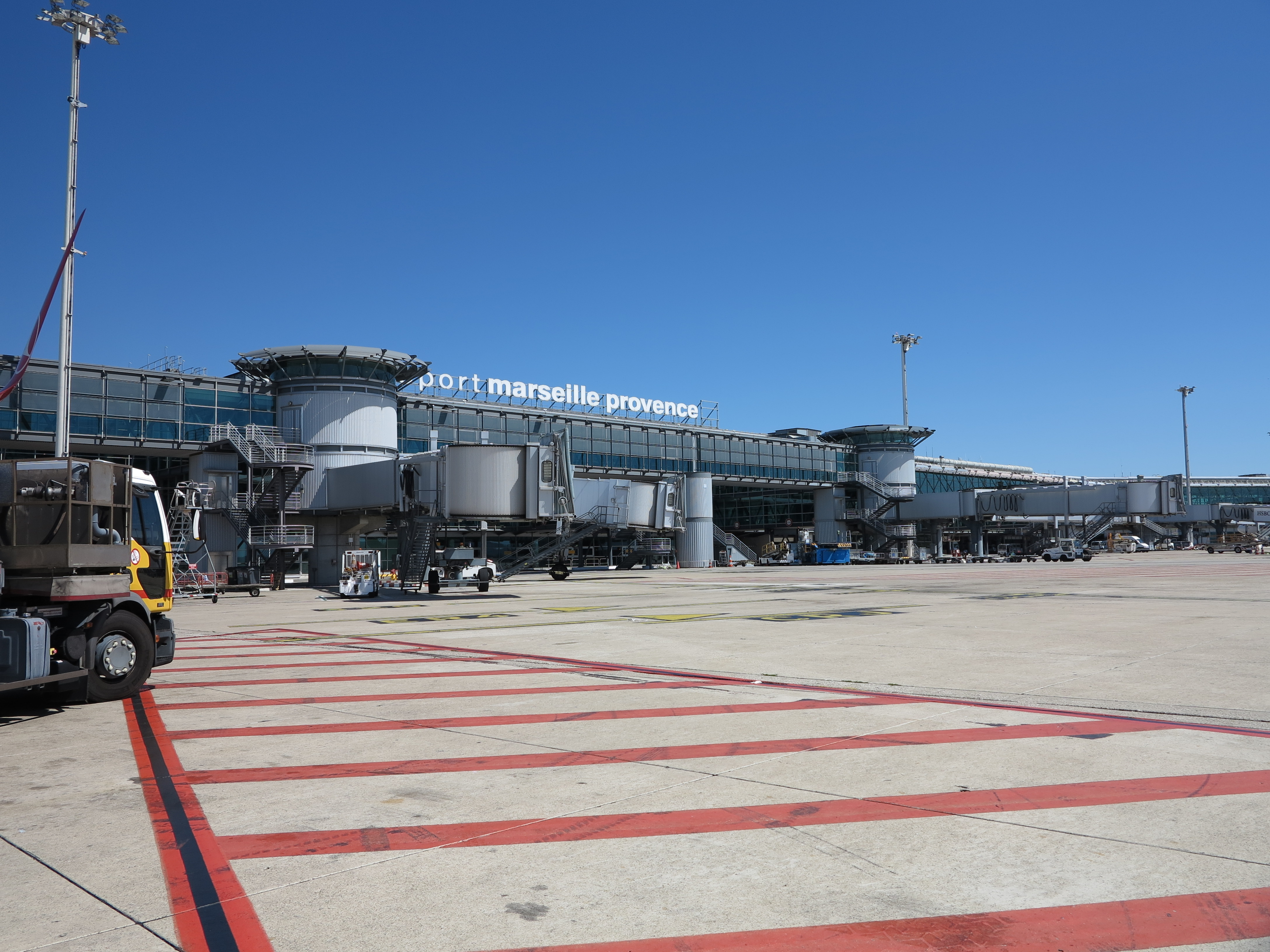
Apron view

Formerly known as Marseille–Marignane Airport, it has been managed since 1934 by the Marseille-Provence Chamber of Commerce and Industry (CCI).

In the 1920s and 1930s, Marignane was one of France's main points of operation for flying boats. It even briefly served as a terminal for Pan American World Airways Clipper flying boats. Other flying boat operators were Aéropostale and Air Union, the latter moving over from Antibes in 1931. Marignane was also a production site for hydroplanes by Lioré et Olivier.

Antoine de Saint-Exupéry describes turning back to Marignane airport with a fuel leak in chapter 8 of Wind, Sand and Stars, before setting out again for Tunis, and the fateful event that informed his later description of the crash-landing in his best-known book, The Little Prince.

In September 2006, the airport opened its new terminal MP2 for low-cost airlines. In 2013, the airport expanded its shopping and dining options with 30 new shops and restaurants, including the first Burger King restaurant in France since 1997.

On 17 June 2024, the new Terminal 1 at Marseille Provence Airport was inaugurated, with about 22,000 square metres of new construction added and 28,000 square metres of existing terminal renovated, including Halls A and B.

== Airlines and destinations ==
=== Passenger ===
The following airlines operate regular scheduled and charter flights at Marseille Provence Airport:

| Airlines | Destinations |
|---|---|
| Aegean Airlines | Seasonal: Athens |
| Aer Lingus | Seasonal: Dublin |
| Air Algérie | Algiers, Annaba, Batna, Béjaïa, Chlef, Constantine, Jijel, Oran; Seasonal: Tlemcen |
| Air Arabia | Fes |
| Air Corsica | Ajaccio, Bastia, Calvi, Figari |
| Air France | Lyon, Paris–Charles de Gaulle |
| Air Transat | Montréal–Trudeau; Seasonal: Québec City |
| Austrian Airlines | Vienna |
| British Airways | London–Heathrow |
| Brussels Airlines | Brussels |
| Corsair International | Dzaoudzi, Mauritius, Saint-Denis de la Réunion |
| easyJet | Bordeaux, London–Gatwick; Seasonal: Bristol |
| El Al | Tel Aviv |
| Ethiopian Airlines | Addis Ababa |
| Eurowings | Seasonal: Düsseldorf |
| Flynas | Jeddah |
| Iberia | Madrid |
| ITA Airways | Seasonal: Rome–Fiumicino |
| KLM | Amsterdam |
| Korean Air | Seasonal charter: Seoul–Incheon |
| Lufthansa | Frankfurt, Munich |
| Nouvelair | Djerba, Monastir, Tunis |
| Pegasus Airlines | Istanbul–Sabiha Gökçen |
| Royal Air Maroc | Casablanca, Marrakesh, Rabat |
| Ryanair | Agadir, Alicante, Bergamo, Bologna, Bucharest–Otopeni, Budapest, Catania, Charleroi, Dublin, Eindhoven, Essaouira, Fès, Kraków, La Rochelle, Lille, Lisbon, London–Stansted, Madrid, Málaga, Malta, Marrakesh, Nador, Nantes, Ouarzazate, Oujda, Palermo, Porto, Prague, Rabat, Rome–Fiumicino, Seville, Stockholm–Arlanda, Tangier, Tétouan, Tirana, Valencia, Wrocław; Seasonal: Amman–Queen Alia, Bari, Bristol, Chania, Corfu, Dubrovnik, Edinburgh, Faro, Ibiza, Manchester, Menorca, Naples, Palma de Mallorca, Shannon, Tours, Treviso, Venice, Zadar |
| Scandinavian Airlines | Seasonal: Copenhagen |
| Shanghai Airlines | Casablanca, Shanghai–Pudong |
| Sky Express | Seasonal: Heraklion |
| Swiss International Air Lines | Zürich |
| TAP Air Portugal | Lisbon |
| Transavia | Athens Beirut, Brest, Cairo, Dakar–Diass, Djerba, Hurghada, Jeddah, Medina, Nantes, Paris–Orly, Seville, Tel Aviv, Tunis; Seasonal: Annaba, Antalya, Biarritz, Funchal, Heraklion, Larnaca, Marrakesh, Praia, Sal, Yerevan |
| Tunisair | Djerba, Monastir, Tunis |
| Turkish Airlines | Istanbul |
| Twin Jet | Biarritz |
| United Airlines | Seasonal: Newark (begins 5 June 2027) |
| Volotea | Athens, Algiers, Caen, Constantine, Fuerteventura, Oran, Rennes, Strasbourg, Tlemcen, Venice; Seasonal: Barcelona, Bordeaux, Brest, Copenhagen, Dubrovnik, Gran Canaria, Heraklion, Lanzarote, Menorca, Murcia, Olbia, Palma de Mallorca, Salerno, Santorini, Split, Tenerife–South |
| Vueling | Barcelona |

=== Cargo ===
| Airlines | Destinations |
|---|---|
| ASL Airlines France | Ajaccio, Bastia, Nice, Paris–Charles de Gaulle, Rennes |
| UPS Airlines | Cologne/Bonn |

== Statistics ==
It is the fifth busiest French airport by passenger traffic and third largest for cargo traffic. In 2012, the airport achieved the fourth highest European passenger traffic growth, at 12.7% with 8,295,479 passengers. Marseille Provence Airport serves as a focus city for Air France. In summer 2013, the airport served 132 regular destinations, the largest offer in France after the Parisian airports.

== Ground transportation ==
The airport is served by the Vitrolles Marseille Provence Airport rail station on the TER network. A public bus runs between the airport and the station.

== Other facilities ==
- The airport was the main fixed wing base of Sécurité Civile, the aerial firefighting division of the French Ministry of the Interior. This Sécurité Civile base has now moved to nearby Nîmes-Garons.
- The head office of Airbus Helicopters is located on the airport property.

== Accidents and incidents ==
- On 4 February 1948, SNCASE Languedoc P/7 F-BATK of Air France was damaged beyond economical repair.
- On 30 July 1950, SNCASE Languedoc P/7 F-BCUI of Air France was damaged beyond economic repair when its undercarriage collapsed on landing.
- On 6 February 1989, Inter Cargo Service Flight 3132, operated by Vickers Vanguard F-GEJE, crashed on takeoff. Three crew died; no passengers were on board.
- On 26 December 1994, Air France Flight 8969, with 236 people aboard, arrived in Marseille after being hijacked by four young men of the Armed Islamic Group (GIA) at Houari Boumediene Airport in Algiers, Algeria, two days prior. After 15 hours on the ground and a breakdown in negotiations, the French special forces GIGN stormed the aircraft. In the ensuing firefight, all four hijackers were killed while three crew, 13 passengers, and 9 GIGN operatives were injured. The Airbus A300B2-1C F-GBEC was written off.

== See also ==
- List of the busiest airports in France
