= Calvi–Sainte-Catherine Airport =

Airport serving Calvi, Corsica, France

Calvi–Sainte-Catherine Airport Aéroport de Calvi–Sainte-Catherine Aeruportu di Calvi Santa Catalina
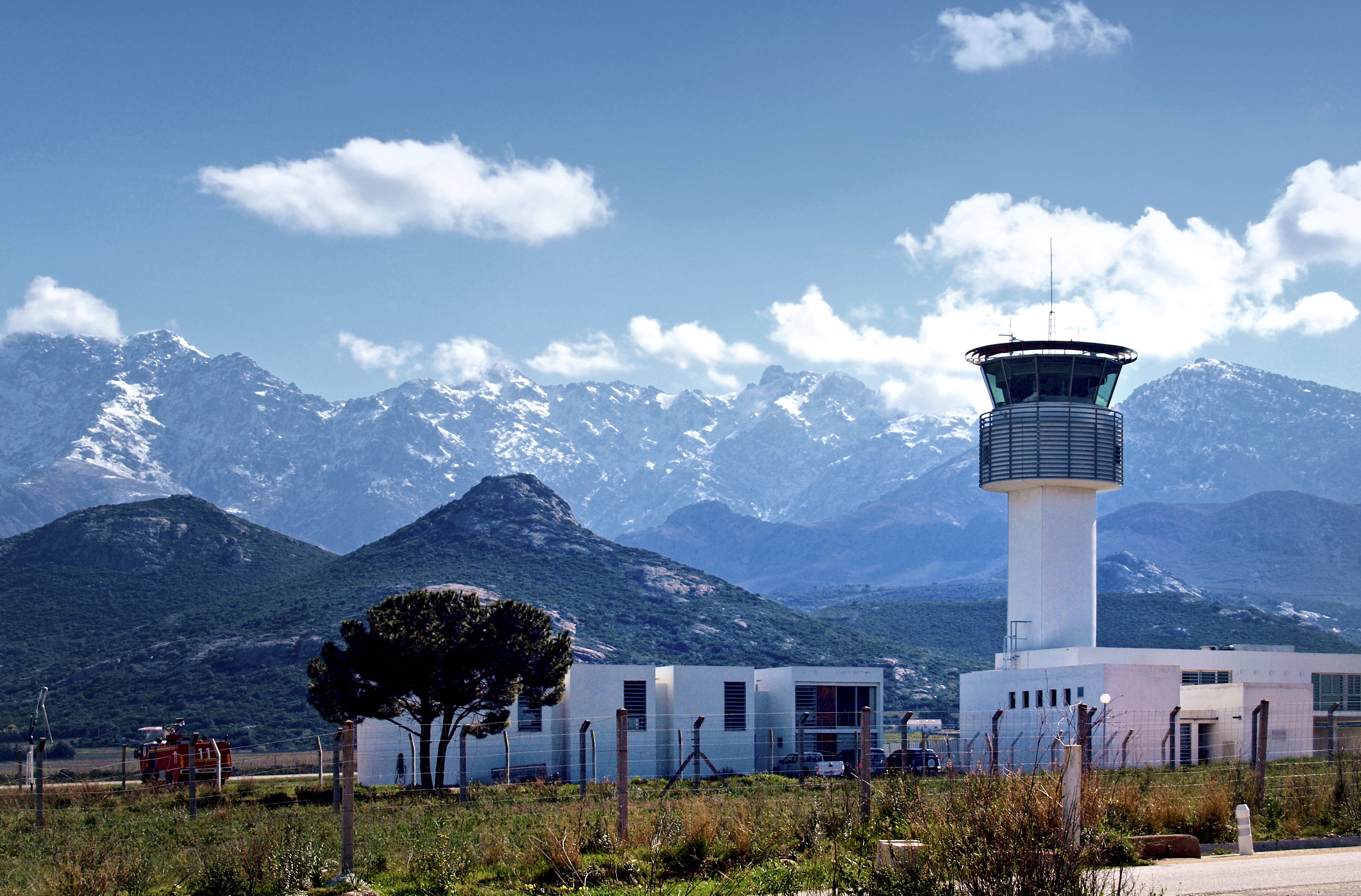
- IATA: CLY; ICAO: LFKC

Summary
- Airport type: Public
- Operator: CCI de Bastia et de la Haute-Corse
- Serves: Calvi, Corsica, France
- Elevation AMSL: 209 ft (64 m)
- Coordinates: 42°31′30″N 08°47′24″E
- Website: calvi.aeroport.fr

Map
- Location of the airport in Corsica LFKC (France)

Runways
Direction	Length		Surface
Direction	m	ft	Surface
18/36	2,310	7,579	Concrete

Statistics (2014)
- Passengers: 326,490
- Passenger change 13-14: ▲7.9%
- Sources: French AIP

Calvi–Sainte-Catherine Airport (Note: French: Aéroport de Calvi–Sainte-Catherine, Corsican: Aeruportu di Calvi Santa Catalina) (IATA: CLY, ICAO: LFKC) is an airport located 6 km southeast of Calvi, a commune of the Haute-Corse department in France, on the island of Corsica.

== Airlines and destinations ==
The following airlines operate regular scheduled and charter flights at Calvi–Sainte-Catherine Airport:

Airlines	Destinations
Air Corsica	Nice, Paris–Orly; Seasonal: Brussels Charleroi, Lyon, Marseille, Munich, Toulouse; Seasonal charter: Bern
Air France	Paris–Charles de Gaulle, Paris–Orly; Seasonal: Caen
Avanti Air	Seasonal charter: Bern, Graz, Memmingen
EasyJet	Seasonal: Basel/Mulhouse, Geneva, Lyon, Paris–Charles de Gaulle
Edelweiss Air	Seasonal: Zurich
Eurowings	Seasonal: Salzburg
Luxair	Seasonal: Luxembourg
Volotea	Seasonal: Bordeaux, Lille, Nantes, Strasbourg
