= Lille Airport =

Lille Airport Aéroport de Lille
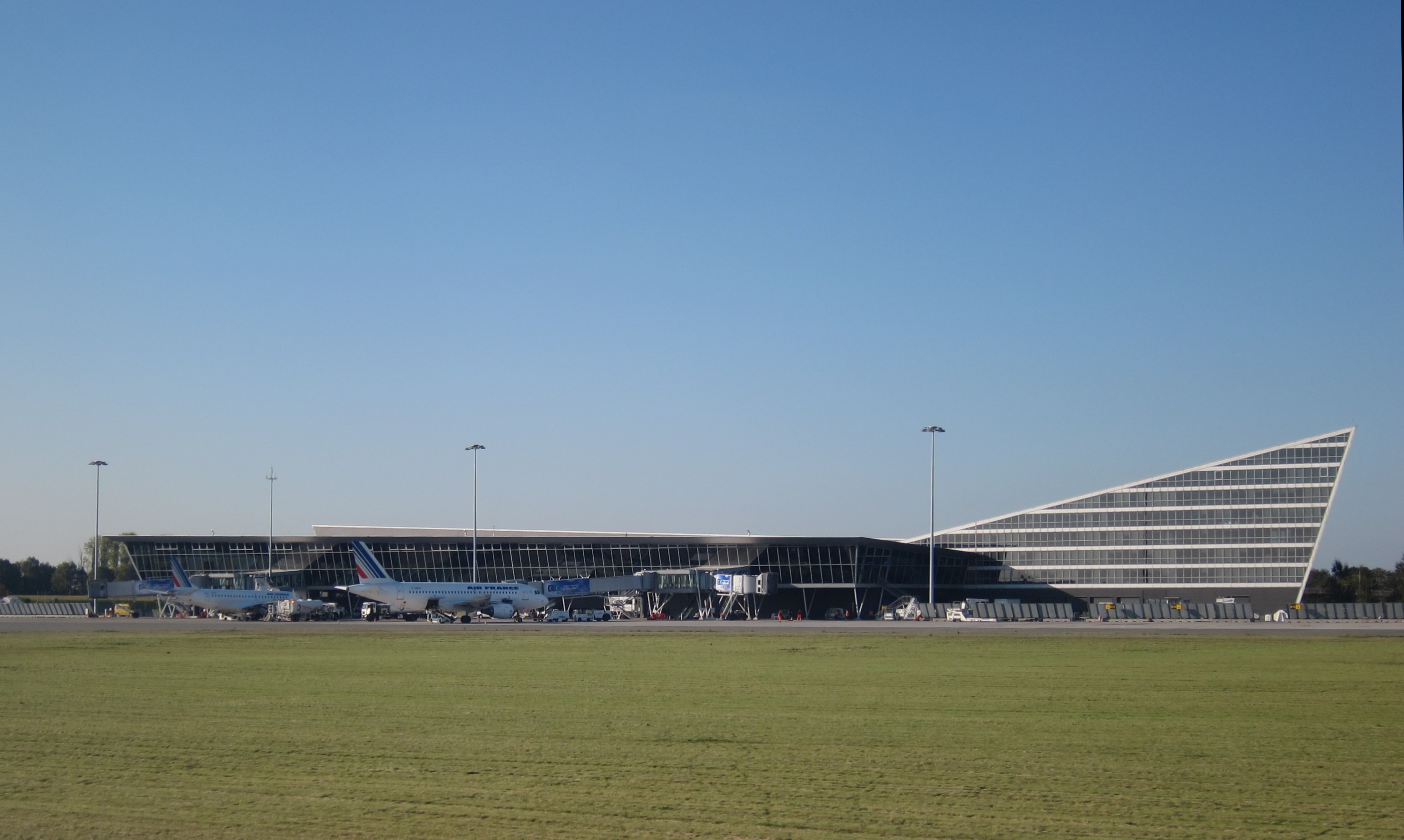
- IATA: LIL; ICAO: LFQQ

Summary
- Airport type: Public
- Operator: Socièté de gestion de l'aéroport de la région de Lille (SOGAREL)
- Serves: Lille, France
- Location: Lesquin, France
- Elevation AMSL: 157 ft (48 m)
- Coordinates: 50°33′48″N 003°05′13″E
- Website: lille.aeroport.fr

Map
- Location of Lille Airport LFQQ (France)

Runways
Direction	Length		Surface
Direction	m	ft	Surface
08/26	2,825	9,268	Asphalt
02/20	1,580	5,184	Asphalt

Statistics (2018)
- Passengers: 2,078,549
- Passenger change 17-18: ▲9.1%
- Sources: Airport, French AIP

Lille Airport (French: Aéroport de Lille) (IATA: LIL, ICAO: LFQQ) is an airport located in Lesquin, 7 km (4 mi) south-southeast of Lille, a city in northern France. It is also known as Lille-Lesquin Airport or Lesquin Airport. Lille is the principal city of the Lille Métropole, the capital of the Hauts-de-France region and the prefecture of the Nord department. The airport is 15 minutes from the city centre of Lille.

The current passenger terminal was built in 1996.

It is the 12th busiest French airport by number of passengers: around 970,000 in 2001 and 1,397,637 in 2012. In terms of cargo, it ranks fourth, with almost 38,000 tonnes passing through each year.

== Airlines and destinations ==
The following airlines operate regular scheduled and charter flights to and from Lille Airport:

Airlines	Destinations
Aegean Airlines	Seasonal: Athens, Heraklion
Air Algérie	Algiers, Constantine, Oran,
Air Montenegro	Seasonal: Podgorica
ASL Airlines France	Seasonal: Algiers, Béjaïa, Djerba, Oran, Sétif, Tlemcen, Toulon
easyJet	Bordeaux, Geneva, Marrakesh, Nice, Prague (begins 28 October 2026); Seasonal: Alicante, Basel/Mulhouse, Palma de Mallorca
Nouvelair	Djerba, Monastir, Tunis
Ryanair	Fès, Porto; Seasonal: Marseille
Sky Express	Heraklion
Transavia	Dakar–Diass, Marrakesh
TUI	Agadir, Casablanca, Marrakesh, Oujda
Volotea	Agadir, Ajaccio, Barcelona, Bastia, Bordeaux, Montpellier, Nice, Perpignan, Rome–Fiumicino, Toulouse, Venice; Seasonal: Athens, Burgas, Bari, Biarritz, Calvi, Comiso, Corfu, Dubrovnik, Faro, Figari, Fuerteventura, Gran Canaria, Heraklion, Lanzarote, Madrid, Málaga, Marrakesh, Menorca, Murcia, Olbia, Palermo, Palma de Mallorca, Patras, Rhodes, Rodez, Seville, Split, Tenerife–South, Toulon, Varna, Valencia

== Ground transportation ==
There is a shuttle bus between the airport and Lille Flandres railway station.
