= Figari–Sud Corse Airport =

Airport serving Figari, Corsica, France

Figari–Sud Corse Airport Aéroport Figari-Sud Corse
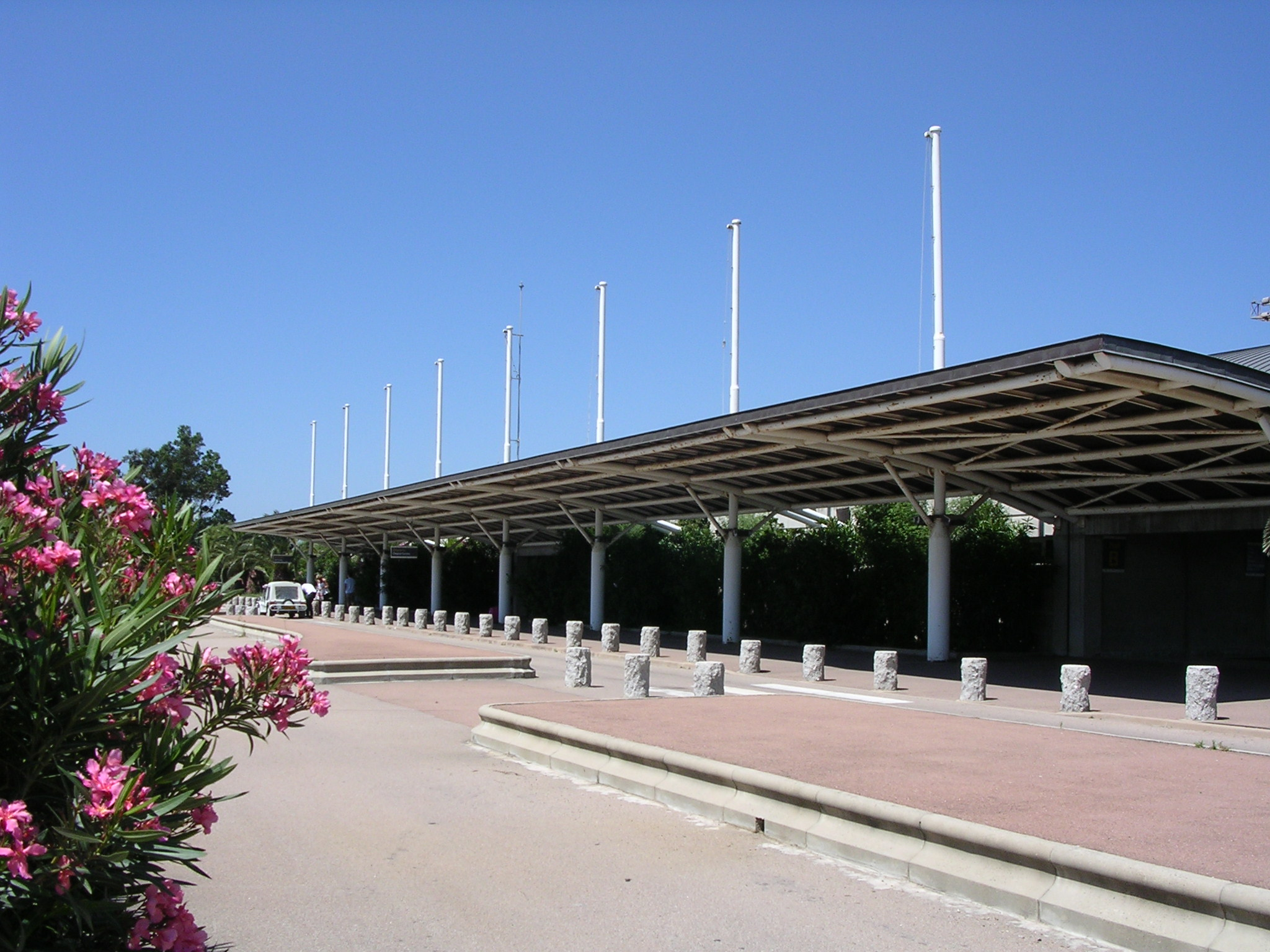
- IATA: FSC; ICAO: LFKF

Summary
- Airport type: Public
- Operator: CCI d'Ajaccio et de la Corse du Sud
- Serves: Figari
- Location: Porto-Vecchio, Corsica, France
- Elevation AMSL: 27 m (89 ft)
- Coordinates: 41°30′08″N 009°05′48″E
- Website: https://figari-aeroport.cci.corsica/

Map
- Location of the airport in Corsica LFKF (France)

Runways
Direction	Length		Surface
Direction	m	ft	Surface
05/23	2,480	8,136	Asphalt

Statistics (2018)
- Passengers: 756,454
- Passenger traffic change: ▲3.5%
- Sources: French AIP, Aeroport.fr

Figari–Sud Corse Airport or Figari South Corsica Airport (Note: French: Aéroport de Figari-Sud Corse) (IATA: FSC, ICAO: LFKF) is an airport located 3 km northwest of Figari, a commune of the Corse-du-Sud département in France, on the island of Corsica and 25 km southwest of Porto-Vecchio.

It is the third largest airport on Corsica and opened in 1975. In 2024, the airport served 877,070 passengers, representing an increase of 1.6% compared to 2023. Passenger traffic was made up of 131,257 passengers on international flights and 745,813 passengers on domestic flights.

== Airlines and destinations ==
The following airlines operate regular scheduled and charter flights at Figari–Sud Corse Airport:

Airlines	Destinations
Air Corsica	Marseille, Nice, Paris–Orly; Seasonal: Charleroi, Lyon, Olbia, Toulon, Toulouse
Air Dolomiti	Seasonal: Frankfurt
Air France	Paris–Orly
British Airways	Seasonal: London–Heathrow
EasyJet	Seasonal: Basel/Mulhouse, Bordeaux, Geneva, London–Gatwick, Lyon, Milan–Linate, Nantes, Paris-Charles de Gaulle
Edelweiss Air	Seasonal: Zürich
Luxair	Seasonal: Luxembourg
Ryanair	Seasonal: Beauvais, Charleroi
Transavia	Seasonal: Nantes
Volotea	Seasonal: Bordeaux, Lille, Lyon, Nantes, Rodez, Strasbourg

== See also ==
- Ajaccio – Napoléon Bonaparte Airport
- List of airports in France
