= Nantes Atlantique Airport =

International airport in Nantes, France

Nantes Atlantique Airport Aéroport Nantes Atlantique

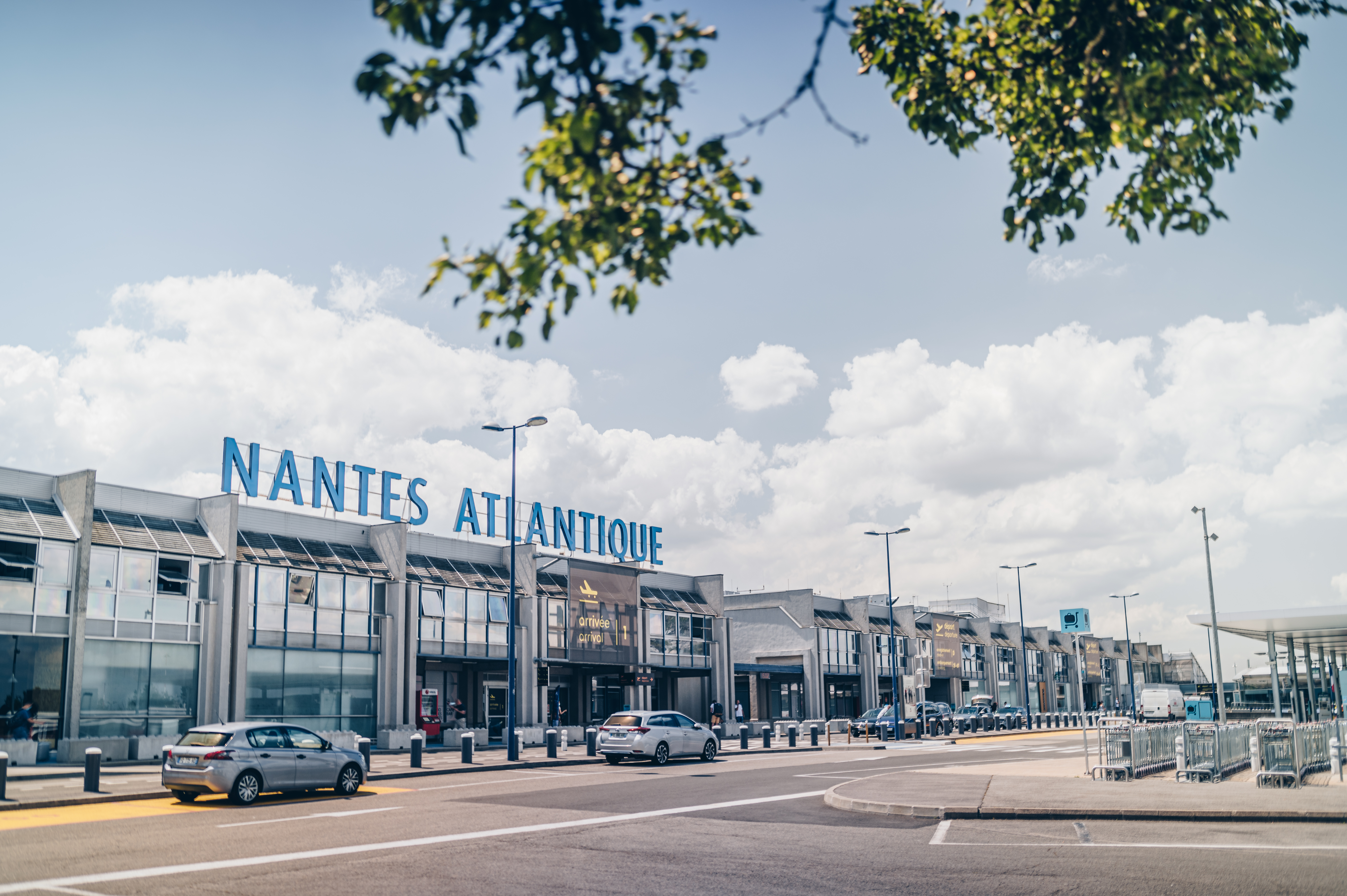
- IATA: NTE; ICAO: LFRS

Summary
- Airport type: Public
- Operator: AGO (Aéroports du Grand Ouest), a subsidiary of Vinci Airports
- Serves: Nantes, France
- Location: Bouguenais, France
- Focus city for: easyJet; Transavia France; Volotea
- Elevation AMSL: 90 ft (27 m)
- Coordinates: 47°09′25″N 001°36′28″W
- Website: nantes.aeroport.fr

Map
- Location of airport in Pays de la Loire region LFRS (France)

Runways
Direction	Length		Surface
Direction	m	ft	Surface
03/21	2,900	9,514	Asphalt concrete

Statistics (2019)
- Passengers: 7,221,000 ▲16.6%
- Aircraft movements: 63,207 ▲
- Source: French AIP; French AIP at EUROCONTROL

Nantes Atlantique Airport (IATA: NTE, ICAO: LFRS) (French: Aéroport Nantes Atlantique, formerly known as Aéroport Château Bougon) is an international airport serving Nantes, France. It is located 8 kilometres (5.0 mi) southwest of the city, in Bouguenais.

The airport is operated by the Chambre de commerce et d'industrie de Nantes. In 2019, the airport handled 7,221,000 passengers, an increase of 16.6% compared to 2018.

== History ==
Nantes airport owes its origins to a military airfield, conceived in 1928 on part of the current site. In 1936/7, the Société Nationale de Constructions Aéronautiques de l'Ouest opened an aircraft factory adjacent to the airfield, initially building MB.210 bombers, followed by M.S.406 fighters and LeO 45 bombers. In 1939, the first paved runway was constructed, with a length of 900 m (2,953 ft).

During World War II, the airfield was briefly used as a British Royal Air Force airfield before being captured by German forces. Under occupation, the aircraft factory was closed, and the airfield was used by the Luftwaffe as an airfield to bomb targets in England. As a consequence, the airfield was hit by a damaging air raid on 4 July 1943, which also destroyed the adjoining aircraft factory.

After the war, the airfield was again put into service by the French Air Force. The aircraft factory was rebuilt, and has since built sections of the Vautour fighter and the Caravelle airliner, before becoming part of Airbus. In 1951, the first commercial operations started, with a new terminal built between 1954 and 1960 and runway extensions to cater for larger aircraft.

Nantes Atlantique is currently the largest airport in the west of France. There were plans to have it replaced by an Aéroport du Grand Ouest, situated 30 km (19 mi) to the north-west of Nantes in the commune of Notre-Dame-des-Landes. The €580 million project was approved in February 2008, with plans to open it in 2017. However, after a nearly 40-year-long controversy regarding the usefulness and impact of such an airport, the project was officially cancelled on 17 January 2018.

On 19 January 2019, a small 6-seater aircraft carrying Argentinian footballer Emiliano Sala left the airport for Cardiff, Wales. Both Sala and the pilot died when the plane crashed in the English Channel. Subsequent investigation showed that pilot David Ibbotson was not licensed to fly passengers on a commercial basis, nor for night flying, and that the aircraft was not airworthy.

== Facilities ==
The airport has a single L-shaped passenger terminal, which is divided into four numbered halls. Halls 1 to 3 form the long side of the 'L' and are zones within the same two-story building, with baggage claim and check-in facilities on the ground floor, and departure lounges on the upper level. Hall 4 occupies a later single storey building at right angles to the earlier building, but connected to it by a lobby.

The airport also has a separate freight terminal, situated to the south of the passenger terminal, which includes 6,000 m^{2} (65,000 sq ft) of entrepôt storage. Also situated close to the passenger terminal is the Nantes factory of Airbus, which specialises in the construction of the centre wing box of the Airbus fleet of airliners and in the use of composite materials for creating structural components.

== Other facilities ==
Régional, a regional airline, was headquartered on the grounds of Nantes Atlantique Airport. In 2013, the airline merged into HOP!

== Airlines and destinations ==
The following airlines operate regular scheduled and charter flights at Nantes Atlantique Airport:

Airlines	Destinations
Aegean Airlines	Seasonal: Athens, Heraklion
Air Algérie	Algiers
Air Canada	Seasonal: Montréal–Trudeau
Air France	Amsterdam, Lyon, Paris–Charles de Gaulle
Air Montenegro	Seasonal: Podgorica
Air Transat	Montréal–Trudeau; Seasonal: Québec City
Corsair International	Seasonal: Fort-de-France, Pointe-à-Pitre
Croatia Airlines	Seasonal: Split
easyJet	Basel/Mulhouse, Brussels (begins 26 October 2026), Budapest, Geneva, Lanzarote, Lisbon, London–Gatwick, Lyon, Madrid, Marrakesh, Milan–Malpensa, Nice, Porto, Prague, Rabat, Rome–Fiumicino, Tenerife–South, Toulouse; Seasonal: Ajaccio, Alicante, Catania, Chania, Corfu, Dubrovnik, Essaouira (begins 27 October 2026), Faro, Funchal, Heraklion, Hurghada, Ibiza, Larnaca, Luxor (begins 31 October 2026), Málaga, Menorca, Naples, Olbia, Palma de Mallorca, Rhodes
Iberia	Madrid
KLM	Amsterdam
Lufthansa	Frankfurt, Munich
Nouvelair	Djerba, Tunis
Royal Air Maroc	Casablanca, Marrakesh
Ryanair	Dublin, Edinburgh, Fès, London–Stansted, Malta, Manchester, Marseille, Seville, Valencia; Seasonal: Agadir
Transavia	Agadir, Algiers, Casablanca, Dakar–Diass, Djerba, Faro, Funchal, Istanbul, Lisbon, Marrakesh, Marseille, Monastir, Montpellier, Nice, Oran, Paris-Orly, Oslo (begins 30 March 2027), Porto, Rome–Fiumicino, Seville, Toulon, Tunis; Seasonal: Antalya, Athens, Bari, Berlin, Boa Vista, Essaouira, Figari, Heraklion, Hurghada, Lanzarote, Oujda, Palermo, Palma de Mallorca, Rhodes, Sal,Santorini, São Vicente (begins 30 October 2026), Tangier, Tirana
Twin Jet	Toulouse
Volotea	Agadir, Athens, Barcelona, Fuerteventura, Gran Canaria, Granada, Lanzarote, Lisbon, Lyon, Madrid, Marrakesh, Milan-Bergamo, Montpellier, Nice, Porto, Prague, Rome–Fiumicino, Strasbourg, Tenerife–South, Toulouse, Venice; Seasonal: Ajaccio, Alicante, Bastia, Brindisi, Calvi, Catania, Charleroi, Copenhagen, Corfu, Dubrovnik, Faro, Figari, Florence, Hamburg, Heraklion, Málaga, La Palma (begins 8 November 2026) Menorca, Naples, Olbia, Palermo, Palma de Mallorca, Patras, Perpignan, Pisa, Rhodes, Split, Varna
Vueling	Barcelona; Seasonal: Palma de Mallorca

== Ground transportation ==
Nantes Atlantique Airport is located just outside the Périphérique de Nantes, the city's peripheral ring motorway, to which it is linked by a short access road. All the major roads and motorways to and from the city of Nantes intersect the 'périphérique'. Several car parks, both in the open and under cover, are located in the terminal area, with each car park having its own tariff.

An express shuttle bus, the 'Navette Tan Air', links a stop outside the airport terminal to Nantes station and the city centre. The service forms part of Nantes's Tan public transport network, but charges a Tan Air fare, which is higher than the standard network fare, for the full journey. Alternatively, TAN bus route 38 can be used to reach Pirmil, and TAN bus route 98 can be used to reach Neustrie, where a connection can be made to line 3 of the Tan tram system, using standard network fares.
