= Antwerp X =

Allied anti-aircraft operation defending Antwerp from German V-1 attacks

Operation Antwerp X
- Part of the Western Front of World War II
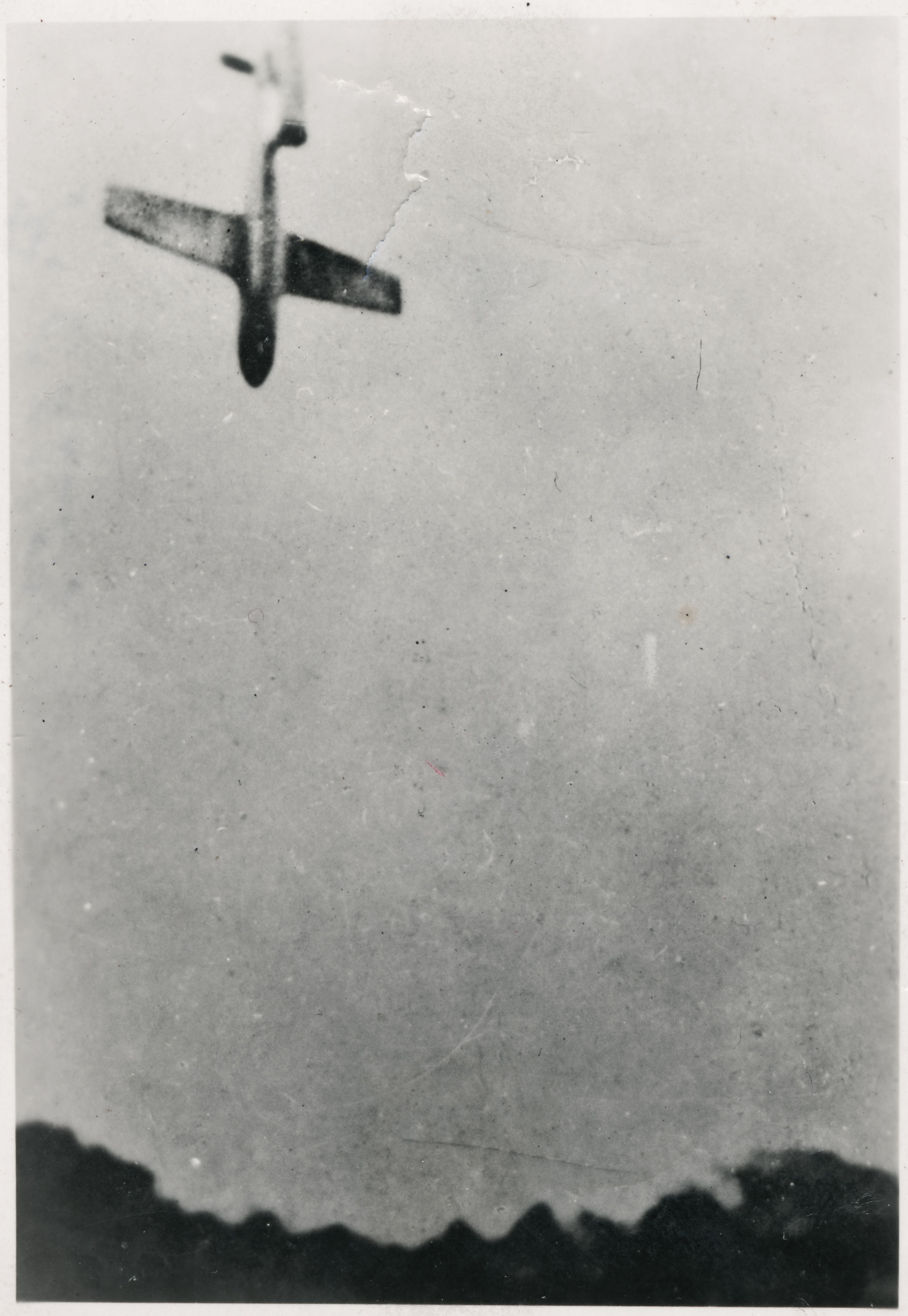
- Falling V-1 bomb over Bouckenborgh; Park in Merksem, Antwerp, in 1945
Date	October 1944 – March 1945
Location	Antwerp, Province of Antwerp, Belgium
Result	Allied anti-aircraft defense substantially reduced the number of V-1 flying bombs reaching the Antwerp vital area

Belligerents
United States; United Kingdom; Poland	Germany

Commanders and leaders
Clare Armstrong; George M. Badger	

Units involved
IX Air Defense Command; 50th Anti-Aircraft Artillery Brigade; British anti-aircraft units Polish anti-aircraft units	German V-weapons units

Strength
c. 22,000 personnel	

Operation Antwerp X, often referred to as Antwerp X, was an Allied anti-aircraft operation during World War II to defend Antwerp and the Port of Antwerp from German V-1 flying bombs. The operation lasted from October 1944 to March 1945, after the liberation of Antwerp and during the port's use as one of the principal Allied supply bases in north-west Europe.

The operation was commanded by Brigadier General Clare Armstrong and brought together American, British and Polish anti-aircraft units. It used a layered system of forward observers, radar, plotting rooms, searchlights, gun-laying computers and anti-aircraft guns to intercept V-1 flying bombs before they reached the Antwerp vital area. Although Antwerp was also severely attacked by V-2 rockets, Antwerp X was not an effective defense against them, since V-2 rockets descended too fast to be intercepted by contemporary anti-aircraft weapons.

Military historians have frequently described Antwerp X as an early form of integrated missile defense. The operation combined radar surveillance, centralized command, analogue computation, proximity-fuzed ammunition and layered anti-aircraft belts into a coordinated defensive network against pilotless weapons.

== Background ==
Map showing V-1 and V-2 impacts in the Arrondissement of Antwerp, 7 October 1944 – 30 March 1945

Antwerp was liberated by the British 11th Armoured Division on 4 September 1944, and the port facilities were captured largely intact. The port could not immediately be used, however, because German forces still controlled the approaches to the Scheldt estuary, including South Beveland and Walcheren. After the failure of Operation Market Garden, Allied supply lines from Normandy became increasingly overstretched, and Antwerp became indispensable for sustaining the advance into Germany.

The approaches to Antwerp were cleared during the Battle of the Scheldt. Walcheren fell in November 1944, and the Royal Navy swept mines from the estuary. The port officially opened to Allied shipping on 28 November 1944. Antwerp rapidly became the main supply line for the 12th Army Group and the 21st Army Group and its importance was recognized by the Germans.

By then Antwerp had already become an important target for German V-weapons. The first V-2 fell on Antwerp on 13 October 1944, causing many casualties. V-1 flying bombs began appearing over the city from 21 October. Mass German attacks began on 24 October 1944. From October 1944 to March 1945, Antwerp and its suburbs were subjected to daily bombardment by both weapons.

== Organization ==
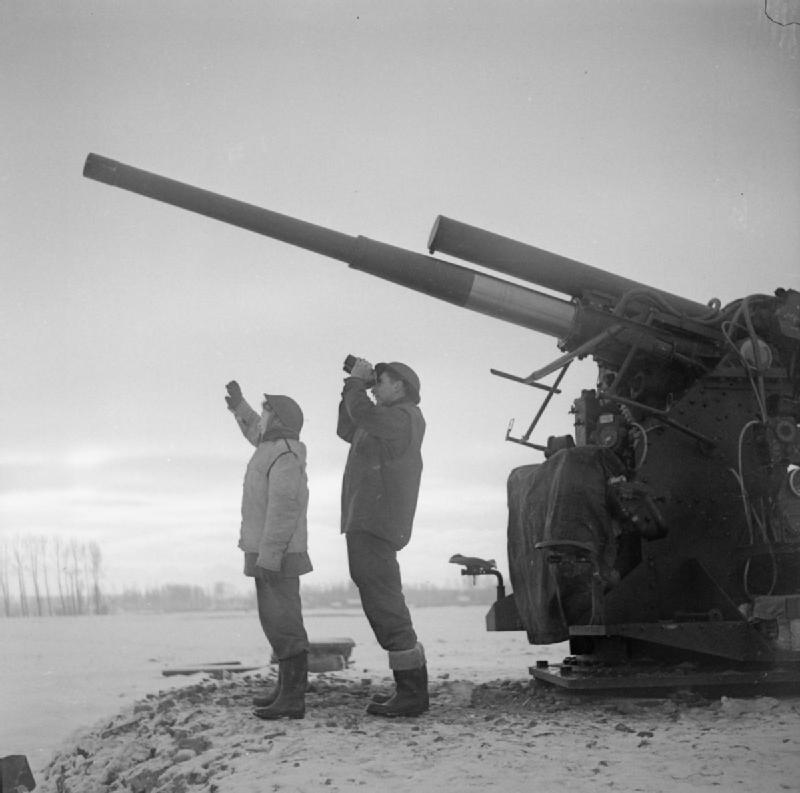
3.7-inch gun of a Mixed Heavy Anti-Aircraft battery in Belgium, January 1945.

The operation Antwerp X began in October 1944 with the creation of a special anti-aircraft command to counter V-1 directed against the port of Antwerp. The zone of command under the 21st Army Group was called "Antwerp-X" and given the object of protecting an area with a radius of 6.4 km (4.0 mi) covering the city center and the dock area.

Unlike the earlier defense of London during Operation Diver, Antwerp presented a more difficult tactical problem because the German launch sites were much closer to the target and fighter aircraft could not safely operate in the defended zone without interfering with the anti-aircraft belts. This reduced warning times and limited the usefulness of fighter interception, increasing dependence on radar-directed anti-aircraft fire.

The first anti-aircraft units were brought into the Antwerp area as Allied intelligence detected German preparations for V-1 launches against the city. The British 80th Anti-Aircraft Brigade was initially assigned to command the air defenses, but American units of the IX Air Defense Command soon took over the V-1 defense. By 10 November 1944, Antwerp X included two brigades, four groups, twelve gun battalions and two automatic-weapons battalions of the IX Air Defense Command, together with the British 42nd Anti-Aircraft Searchlight Regiment.

The anti-aircraft batteries were organized into successive "gun belts" positioned along the expected flight paths of incoming V-1s. A screen of observers equipped with searchlights were deployed along the attack azimuth, behind which were three rows of batteries with more searchlights. Flying bombs surviving one belt would enter the fire zones of other batteries farther inland before reaching the Antwerp vital area, including docks, oil installations, warehouses, rail connections, supply depots and other infrastructure essential to Allied logistics. The system combined early warning, forward observers, radar tracking, fire-control computers and heavy anti-aircraft guns.

The U.S. anti-aircraft artillery gun battalions included the 125th, 126th, 184th, 405th, 407th, 494th and 740th. The U.S. automatic-weapons battalions included the 788th and 789th. The British contingent included the 80th Anti-Aircraft Brigade, the 42nd Searchlight Regiment, and anti-aircraft regiments of the Royal Artillery attached to 21st Army Group. Polish anti-aircraft units also participated in the Antwerp X defenses under Allied command, although the published sources do not consistently identify the individual Polish battalions or regiments involved.

The main heavy weapons were American 90 mm anti-aircraft guns and British QF 3.7-inch heavy anti-aircraft guns. The defense also used 40 mm Bofors automatic weapons, smaller automatic weapons and searchlights. By March 1945 the defenses included 208 American 90 mm guns, 128 British 3.7-inch guns, 188 40 mm Bofors guns of American, British and Polish units, and 72 searchlights of the British 42nd Anti-Aircraft Searchlight Regiment.

Since the V-1 did not maneuver, except during its terminal descent, its linear trajectory made it suitable for electromechanical fire-control systems, such as the No 10 Predictors (the all-electric Bell Labs AAA Computer) and the Vickers No 1 Predictor. Radar information, observer reports and firing data were transmitted to central plotting rooms, where controllers coordinated the engagement zones of individual batteries to reduce overlap and conserve ammunition. The most effective heavy batteries used the SCR-584 radar, the M9 Gun Director and the proximity fuze.

The M9 Gun Director predicted the target location position based on course, height and speed which combined with the gun, shell and fuse characteristics predicted an impact position, adjusted each gun and fired the shell. The introduction of the VT fuse in January 1945 increased the chance of destroying or disabling the flying bomb and reduced ammunition consumption. The smaller tactical firing unit was usually a battery of four 90 mm anti-aircraft guns.

The command eventually involved about 22,000 American, British and Polish personnel. Its headquarters were associated with the hotel Le Grand Veneur at Keerbergen, outside Antwerp. A later command post was established at Rubenslei 17 in Antwerp, where a memorial plaque to Armstrong was later installed.

Military historians have treated Antwerp X as an early example of integrated missile defense. Its combination of radar tracking, analogue computation, proximity-fuzed ammunition and centralized command anticipated later air-defense systems, although it remained limited to relatively slow, air-breathing targets such as the V-1.

== Operations ==
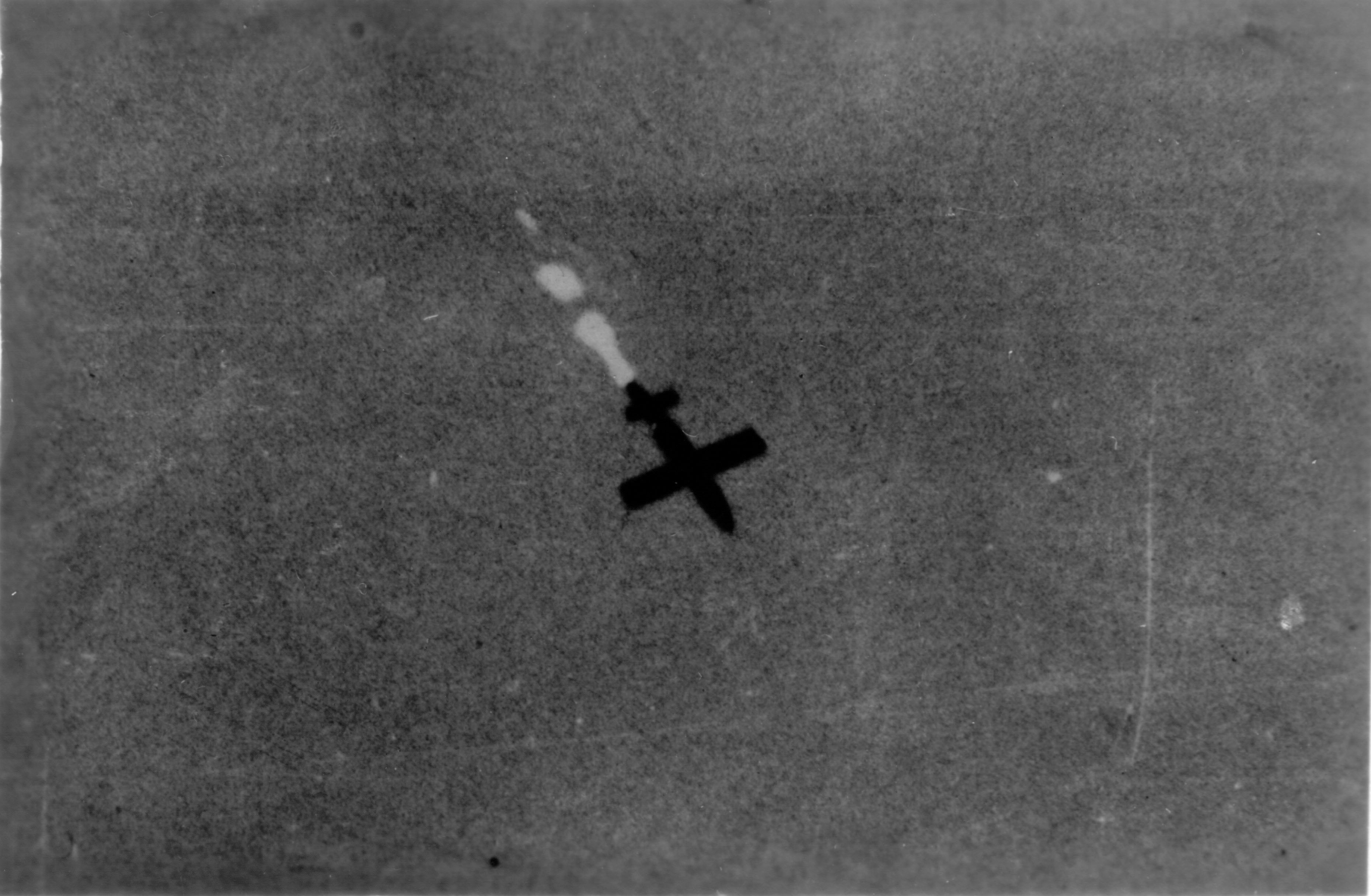
V-1 in flight over Antwerp

V-1 attacks began on 24 October 1944 and continued for 154 days until 30 March 1945. Hamilton gives a total of 8,696 V-weapons launched against Antwerp during this period, with between 100 and 200 per day at the peak of the offensive.

In October and November 1944 most V-1 attacks on Antwerp came from the south-east, from launch areas near Burgsteinfurt and near Bonn. During the first two months of the campaign, up to 30 November, 546 V-1s passed over the existing anti-aircraft defenses. Of these, 250 were assessed as threats to the Antwerp vital area, and 119 were destroyed by anti-aircraft fire. In December, the defense improved. The IX Air Defense Command recorded 467 vital-area threats during the month January, of which 278 were destroyed, a result of just under 60 percent. During the Battle of the Bulge, some German V-1 effort was diverted toward supply centers near Liège, but Antwerp remained a major target.

As Allied forces overran German launch areas in Belgium and western Germany, V-1 launch sites were progressively displaced northward into the occupied Netherlands, forcing repeated redeployment of Antwerp X gun belts. Because the Rhine and Maas rivers, together with flooded terrain, prevented Allied forces from advancing farther north, V-1 flying bombs could be launched from sites only 70–110 km (43–68 mi) north of Antwerp. From these positions, the vital areas of the port could be struck with more than 90 percent accuracy. About 25 percent of all attacks came from these northern launch sites.

During the winter, V-1 attacks increasingly came from the north-east and then from the north, including launch sites in the Netherlands. These shorter ranges reduced warning time and made interception more difficult. By January 1945 the defenses were reorganized to meet attacks from several directions, and additional equipment improved the kill rate.

The last south-eastern attack occurred on 10 March 1945, the last northern attack on 29 March, and the last north-eastern attack on 30 March. During one six-day period in March, Antwerp X achieved a recorded score of 97.8 percent, destroying 89 of 91 V-1s. This figure represented a late-campaign peak rather than the average result for the whole operation.

== Results and effectiveness ==
The operation did not destroy every V-1 fired at Antwerp, but it substantially reduced the number reaching the port and city. Its success depended on the V-1's relatively low speed and predictable flight path. Damaged V-1s could still crash outside vital areas, causing casualties among civilians and soldiers under the approach routes.

During the campaign, Allied military agencies detected 4,883 flying bombs and intercepted 2,183. Only 211 hit the target area (8%). Of these, 55 were not engaged by the defending guns because of restrictions against firing in non-restricted areas. During periods of heavy attack, anti-aircraft batteries fired up to 15,000 rounds in a single night, placing severe strain on ammunition supplies. To conserve ammunition, anti-aircraft artillery was permitted to engage only those targets assessed as threatening the designated vital areas.

In total, 2,759 flying bombs were assessed as accurately aimed at vital areas in Antwerp and the Port of Antwerp. Anti-aircraft fire destroyed 1,766 of these vital-area threats (64%), while the remaining 782 missed because of range errors or mechanical failure.

Selected Antwerp X V-1 interception figures
Period	Threats to vital areas	Hits	Interception rate
October 1944	41	6	72%
November 1944	209	24	62%
December 1944	381	58	52%
January 1945	467	29	64%
February 1945	1110	52	72%
March 1945	551	42	85%
Whole campaign	2,759	211	64%

Although Antwerp X is often discussed in connection with the wider V-weapon bombardment of Antwerp, its active defensive success ony concerned the V-1 flying bomb. V-1s could be detected, tracked and engaged. The V-2 could not be shot down after launch. V-2s arrived without effective warning and caused sudden destruction wherever they fell. Its impact could only be mitigated by attacks on launch infrastructure, dispersal, civil defense and repair measures.

== Civilian and military impact ==
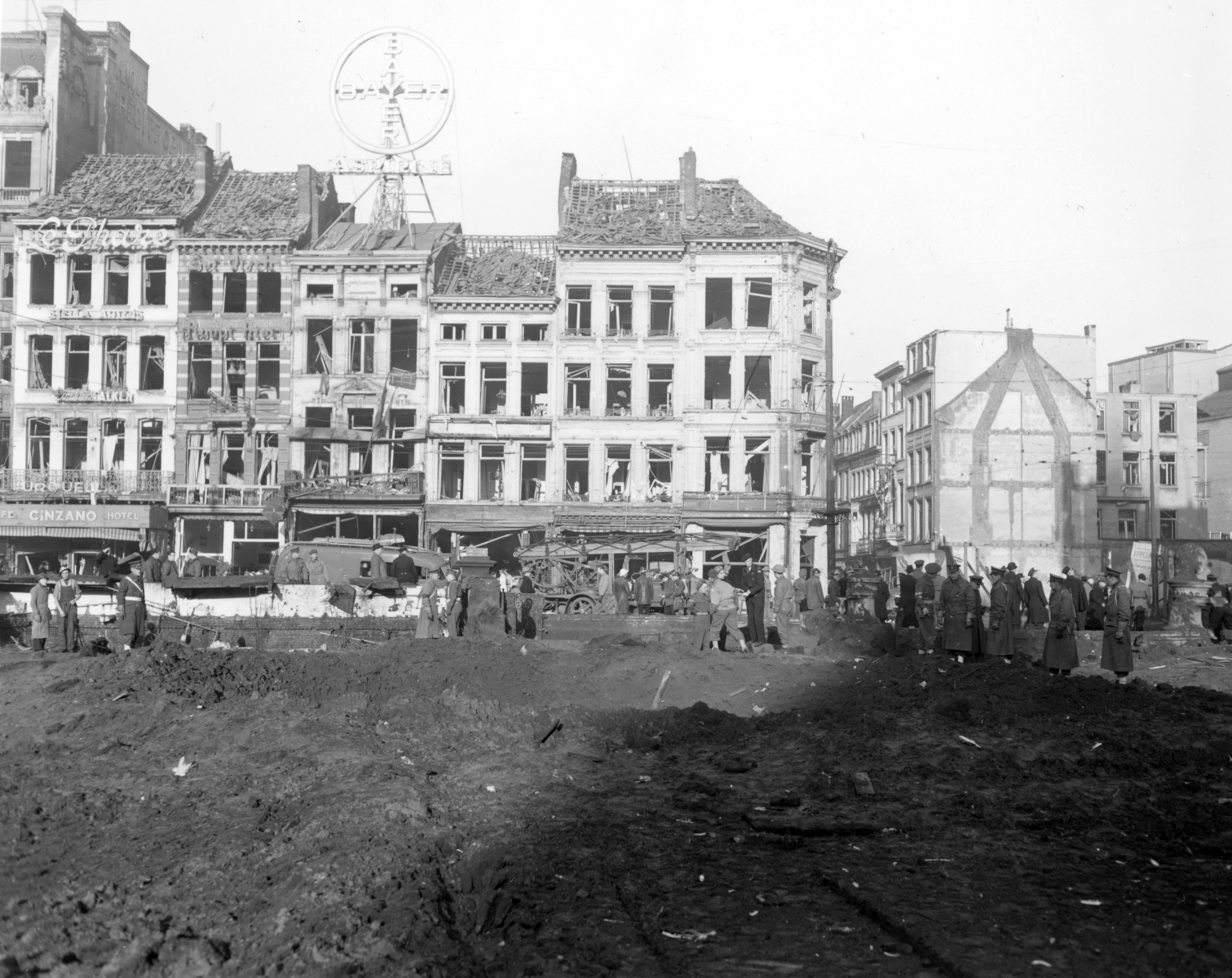
View of crater and buildings following the explosion of a V-1 on 5 January 1945 (Antwerp)

As a major port under Allied control close to Germany, Antwerp was bombarded daily for more than five months with V-weapons intended to disrupt Allied logistics and undermine civilian morale. The defense of Antwerp relied not only on anti-aircraft artillery but also on civil-defense measures. Belgian passive air-defense services, known as Passieve Luchtbescherming (PLB), operated throughout the bombardment period, carrying out rescue work, firefighting, casualty evacuation and recovery operations after V-1 and V-2 impacts.

As the bombardment intensified, Allied leaders feared that the civilian workforce would leave the city for safer areas, reducing the port's capacity. In January 1945, following a request from Supreme Headquarters Allied Expeditionary Force (SHAEF), the British Civil Defence Service sent No. 1 Overseas Column to Antwerp. The unit consisted of volunteers, many of whom had previous experience during the Blitz in Britain. Rescue work remained dangerous. Civil defense workers and military personnel continued to be killed or wounded during rescue and recovery operations.

Photographs of captured V-1 flying bombs displayed in Antwerp in June 1945

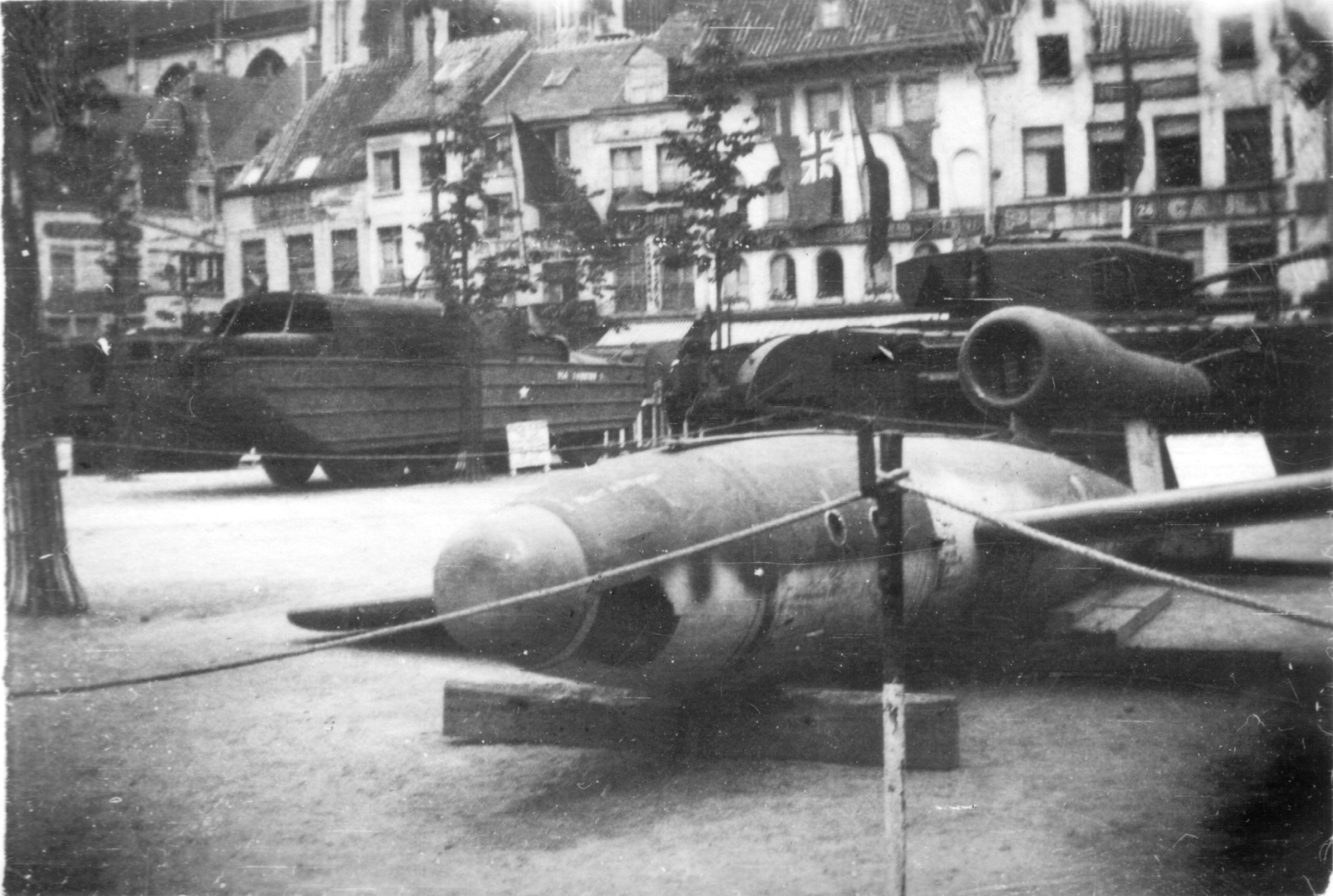

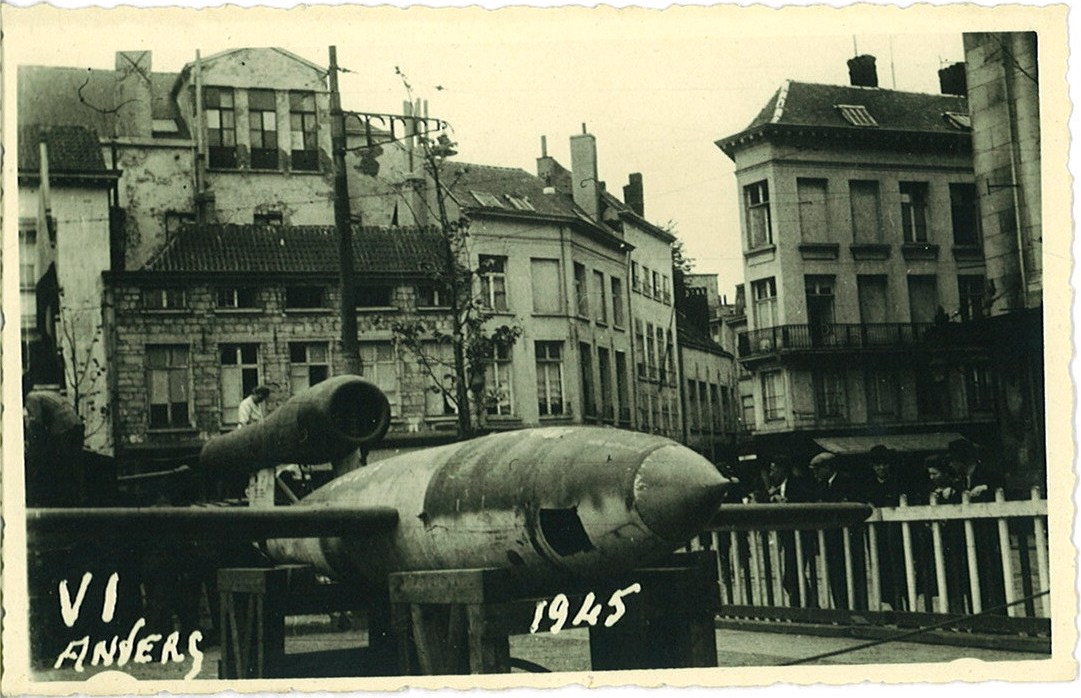

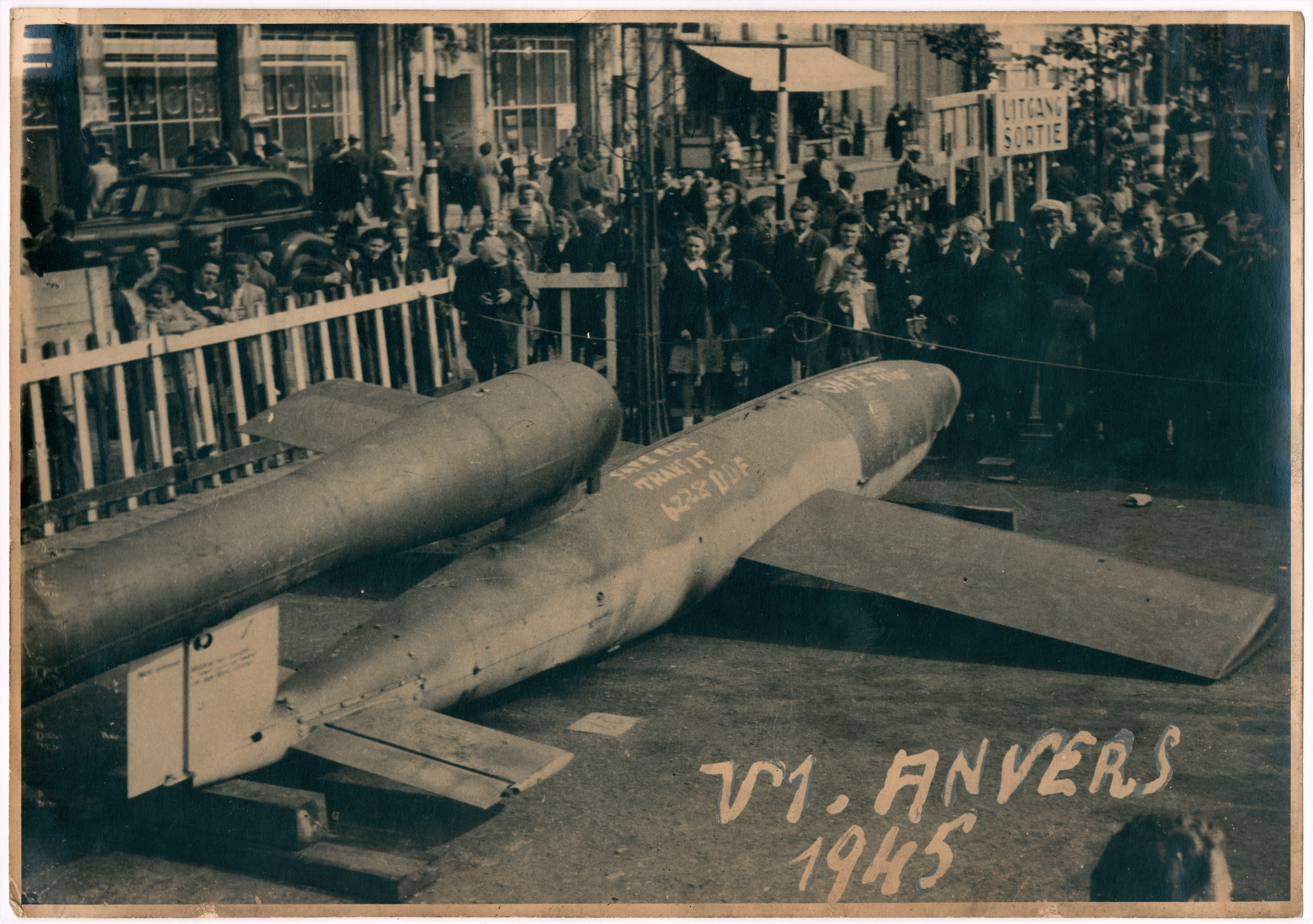

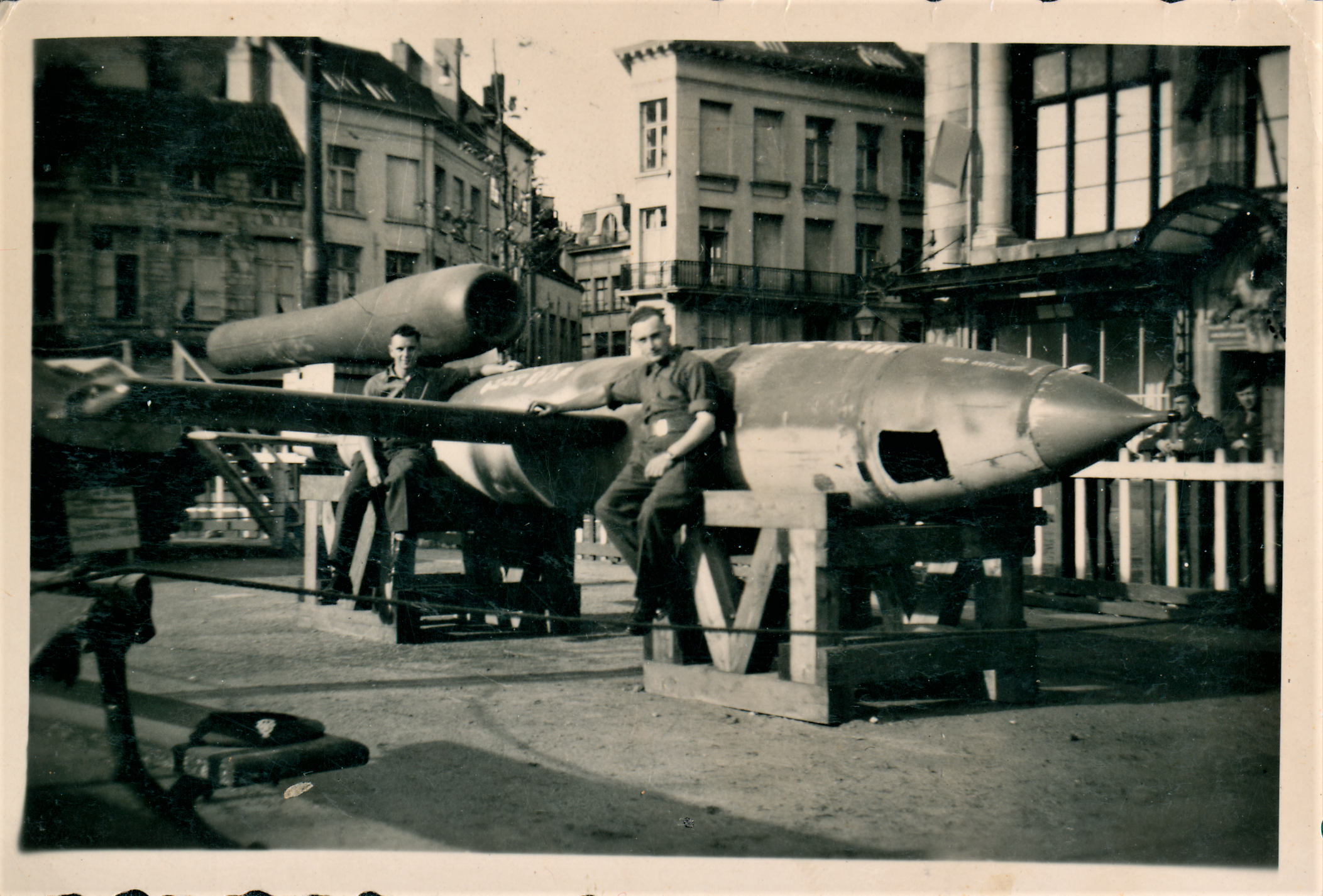

Even successful interceptions remained hazardous, since destroyed or damaged V-1s frequently crashed into suburban districts outside the protected port zone. The bombardment caused heavy casualties in Antwerp and its suburbs. Communities around the anti-aircraft belts also suffered from falling debris, crashed V-1s and anti-aircraft fire. Museum and commemorative sources from the Antwerp region emphasize that civilians and soldiers lived for months under the constant noise of flying bombs and heavy guns. The exposed troops stationed in Antwerp also suffered from a psychological strain caused by the unpredictability of flying bombs and rockets, including anxiety, sleep disturbance and fatigue. In March 1945, the press referred to Antwerp as "the City of Sudden Death".

CegeSoma gives a toll of 4,229 dead and nearly 7,000 wounded in Antwerp from V-weapons. Military personnel were also affected. According to the IX Air Defense Command, 32 military personnel were killed and 298 wounded by V-weapons during the Antwerp X period.

== Commemorations ==
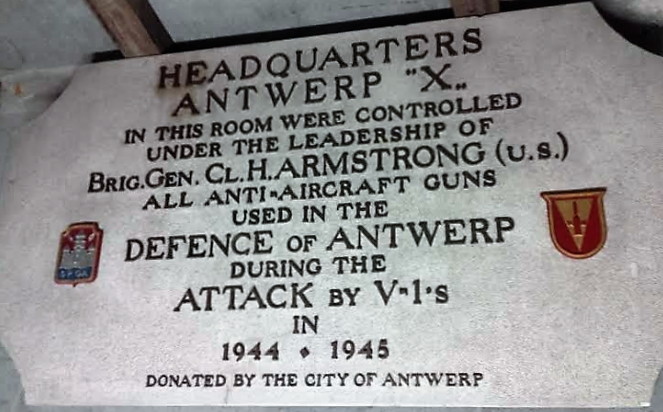
Memorial stone at the former hotel Le Grand Veneur in Keerbergen

Brigadier General Clare H. Armstrong became closely associated with Antwerp X and was later honored in Antwerp by Belgian and local authorities as a symbol of the defense of the city and port at the end of the war. He was made a Freeman of Antwerp, a distinction shared only with Winston Churchill, General Eisenhower and Field Marshal Montgomery. Since 1947, a bust of Armstrong is displayed in Antwerp's city hall.

A memorial plaque was placed at Rubenslei 17 in Antwerp, where Armstrong had a headquarters. After the building was demolished in the early twenty-first century, the plaque was preserved and later restored to public display. A separate memorial stone commemorating Antwerp X was also associated with the former hotel Le Grand Veneur in Keerbergen.

The U.S. War Department produced a 1947 film, Defense of Antwerp Against the V-1, about the Antwerp X system. The film covers the multinational system of forward observers, radar, plotting and anti-aircraft guns used to defend Antwerp against V-1 flying bombs in late 1944 and early 1945.

== See also ==
- Operation Diver
- V-1 flying bomb
- V-2 rocket
- Battle of the Scheldt
- Port of Antwerp
- 184th AAA Battalion (United States)
- 789th Anti-Aircraft Artillery Battalion

== Bibliography ==
- Badger, George M. (September–October 1945). "Some Sidelights on Antwerp X" (PDF). Coast Artillery Journal. 88 (5): 11–13. Archived from the original (PDF) on 2 May 2019.
- Backus, Richard J. (15 June 1971). The Defense of Antwerp Against the V-1 Missile (PDF) (Report). Southern Colorado State College. AD0733387. Archived from the original on 2 September 2023.
- "Bunkermuseum Antwerpen". Bunkermuseum Antwerpen.
- Kesteloot, Chantal (2019). "75 jaar geleden – Toen Antwerp X de Metropool probeerde te beschermen tegen de V1's en V2's". CegeSoma (in Dutch).
- "Civil Defence Reserve – No. 1 Overseas Column, Antwerp 1945". WW2 Civil Defence Uniforms, Insignia, Helmets and Equipment. 2021.
- Cull, Brian (2008). "The assault on Antwerp and Liège – October 1944 – March 1945". Diver! Diver! Diver!. London: Grub Street. ISBN 978-1-904943-39-6.
- Dallmeyer, A. R. Jr. (September–October 1945). "Antwerp X: The Secret Command Which Saved the Allies' Number One Supply Port" (PDF). Coast Artillery Journal. 88 (5): 2–7. Archived from the original (PDF) on 2 May 2019.
- De Maeseneer, Guido (2001). Peenemünde: The Extraordinary Story of Hitler's Secret Weapons V-1 and V-2. Vancouver: AJ Publishing. pp. 365–366. ISBN 978-0-9699542-1-7.
- Tactical Employment of Antiaircraft Artillery Units, Including Defense Against Pilotless Aircraft (V-1) (PDF) (Report). ETO Report 38. Headquarters, European Theater of Operations, United States Army. 1945. Archived from the original (PDF) on 10 August 2023.
- Freeman, A. G. (1946). "Effect on Troops of the "V" Weapon Bombardment of Antwerp". British Medical Journal. 1 (4436): 58–59. doi:10.1136/bmj.1.4436.58. PMC 2057973. PMID 20786508.
- Greenwald, Byron Edward (2003). U.S. Antiaircraft Artillery and the Battle for Legitimacy, 1917–1945 (PhD thesis). Ohio State University.
- "Gedenkplaat voor Brigade-generaal Claire H. Armstrong". Hangar Flying (in Dutch). 14 September 2016.
- Hamilton, John A. (January–February 2008). "Cruise Missile Defense: Defending Antwerp against the V-1". Fires Bulletin. Defense Technical Information Center: 42–45.
- Hogg, Ian V. (1978). Anti-aircraft: A History of Air Defence. London: Macdonald and Jane's. pp. 132–133. ISBN 978-0-354-01163-1.
- IX Air Defense Command (1945). Historical and Statistical Summary, 1 January 1944 – 1 June 1945. IX Air Defense Command.
- US Department of Defense (1947). "Defense of Antwerp Against the V-1". archive.org.
- King, Benjamin (2010). Antwerp and the German Attack on Allies' Supply Lines, 1944–1945 (PDF). Archived from the original (PDF) on 18 June 2022.
- King, Benjamin; Kutta, Timothy (1998). "Antwerp X". Impact: The History of Germany's V-Weapons in World War II. Rockville Centre, NY: Sarpedon. pp. 268–273. ISBN 978-1-885119-51-3.
- Routledge, N. W. (1994). History of the Royal Regiment of Artillery: Anti-Aircraft Artillery, 1914–55. London: Brassey's. ISBN 978-0-08-040983-2.
- Serrien, Pieter (2016). Elke dag angst: De terreur van de V-bommen op België, 1944–1945 (in Dutch). Antwerp: Horizon. ISBN 978-94-92159-58-8.
- Serrien, Pieter (6 July 2017). "25 oktober 1944: V2 Keerbergen Antwerp X" (in Dutch).
- "The Story of Antwerp X". 225th AAA Searchlight Battalion. Archived from the original on 2 September 2023.
- "City of Sudden Death". Time. 26 March 1945. ISSN 0040-781X.
- Tumchewics, Louise (2023). "Civil Affairs in Antwerp 1944–1945: Critical Infrastructure and Civil Defense". Journal of Strategic Security. 16 (3): 1–16. doi:10.5038/1944-0472.16.3.2145. ISSN 1944-0464.
- United States Army Air Defense Center (1965). "Antwerp V-1 defense". Air Defense: An Historical Analysis. United States Army. pp. 147–154.
- "Antwerp". U.S. Army Transportation Corps and Transportation School.
- "Clare H. Armstrong 1917 – West Point Association of Graduates". West Point Association of Graduates.
- William, Edgar Jr. (September–October 1945). "Ground Defense Plan: Antwerp X" (PDF). Coast Artillery Journal. 88 (5): 8–10. Archived from the original (PDF) on 2 May 2019.
