= Ushant Airport =

Ushant Airport Aéroport d'Ouessant
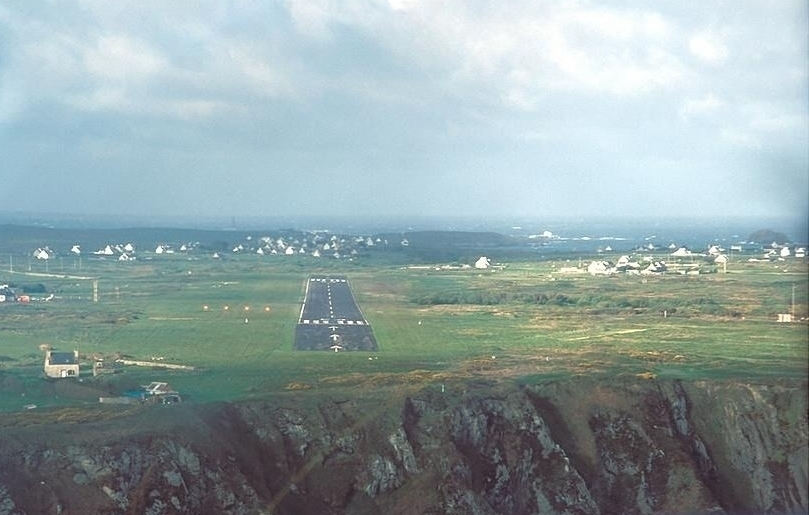
- IATA: OUI; ICAO: LFEC

Summary
- Airport type: Public
- Operator: Commune d'Ouessant
- Serves: Ushant
- Location: Lampaul, Ushant
- Elevation AMSL: 142 ft / 43 m
- Coordinates: 48°27′49″N 005°03′43″W

Map
- Location of airport in Brittany LFEC (France)

Runways
Direction	Length		Surface
Direction	m	ft	Surface
05/23	833	2,733	Paved
- Source: French AIP

Ushant Airport (French: Aéroport d'Ouessant; Breton: Aerborzh Ushant) (IATA: OUI, ICAO: LFEC), is an airport serving the French island of Ushant. It is located in the commune of Lampaul within the département of Finistère.

== Airlines and destinations ==
The following airlines operate regular scheduled and charter flights at Ushant Airport:

Airlines	Destinations
Finist'air	Brest
