= Ushant =

Ushant: Eusa (Breton); Ouessant (French)
- Commune
- Aerial view of Ushant in 2026

- Flag Coat of arms
- Location of Ushant
- Location within France Location within Brittany
- Coordinates: 48°27′40″N 5°05′00″W
- Country: France
- Region: Brittany
- Department: Finistère
- Arrondissement: Brest
- Canton: Saint-Renan

Government
  - Mayor (2026–32): David Quantin
- Area^{1}: 15.58 km^{2} (6.02 sq mi)
- Elevation: 30 m (98 ft)
- Highest elevation: 61 m (200 ft)
- Lowest elevation: 0 m (0 ft)
- Population (2023): 860
  - Density: 55/km^{2} (140/sq mi)
- Time zone: UTC+01:00 (CET)
  - Summer (DST): UTC+02:00 (CEST)
- INSEE/Postal code: 29155 /29242
- Website: Official website
- ^{1} French Land Register data, which excludes lakes, ponds, glaciers > 1 km^{2} (0.386 sq mi or 247 acres) and river estuaries.

Ushant (/ˈʌʃənt/; Breton: Eusa, pronounced [ˈøsa]; French: Ouessant, pronounced [wɛsɑ̃]) is a French island at the southwestern end of the English Channel that marks the westernmost point of metropolitan France. It belongs to Brittany and in medieval times, Léon. In lower tiers of government, it is a commune in the Finistère department. It is the only place in Brittany, save for Brittany itself, with a separate name in English.

== Geography ==
The territory of the municipality of Ouessant consists mainly of the island of Ouessant, which is surrounded by several islets. The largest of these, situated to the north, is the Keller Island (Île de Keller) and Kadoran (Île Cadoran) to the north. The 200-meter (660 ft) channel between Ushant and Keller is called the Toull C'heller. To the southeast, Ushant is separated from the Ponant Islands by the Fromveur Passage; the Ushant side of the strait is marked by La Jument lighthouse, on a rock about 300 metres offshore.

Ushant marks the southern limit of the Celtic Sea and the southern end of the western English Channel, the northern end being the Isles of Scilly, southwest of Land's End in Cornwall. Ushant lies outside the English Channel and is in the Celtic Sea.

The island is a rocky landmass at most eight by three kilometres (five by two miles), covering 15 km^{2} (5 3/4 sq mi).

== History ==
Several Neolithic megaliths were located on the island, alongside a long-lived Bronze Age sanctuary but the latter is not visible anymore.

Ushant is famous for its maritime past, both as a fishing community and as a landmark in the Channel approaches. It is named in the refrain of the sea shanty "Spanish Ladies":

We'll rant and we'll roar like true British sailors,
We'll rant and we'll roar across the salt seas,
Until we strike soundings in the channel of old England,
From Ushant to Scilly 'tis thirty-five leagues.

The British and French navies fought several battles near Ushant.

On 23 July 1815 the captive Emperor Napoleon – aboard HMS Bellerophon towards his final exile – spent several hours on deck watching Ushant, the last part of France he saw.

On 28 May 1896, the SS Drummond Castle ran aground and sank off Ushant after attempting to pass the island to the south; 242 passengers and crew died.

During World War II, a force of British Commandos and US Army Rangers of the 29th Provisional Rangers attacked a German radar installation on Ushant.

In March 1978, the oil tanker Amoco Cadiz ran aground at Portsall about 19 miles (31 km) from the island, leading to major pollution of the Brittany coast.

According to an old Breton proverb, "Qui voit Molène voit sa peine / Qui voit Ouessant voit son sang / Qui voit Sein voit sa fin / Qui voit Groix voit sa croix." ("Who sees Molène sees his pains (or penalty) / who sees Ushant sees his blood / who sees Sein sees his end / who sees Groix sees his cross"). This proverb underlines local points, which are often deadly to navigate with many rocks, and tidal streams of more than ten knots.

A standard start and finish line for traditional all-oceans circumnavigations is between Ushant and Lizard Point.

Ushant has a single school, attended by the majority of the island's youth: L'École D'Ouessant, southeast of the main town. It is the island's only large workplace and a major employer.

== Population ==
Historical population
Year	Pop.	±% p.a.
1968	1,814	—
1975	1,450	−3.15%
1982	1,221	−2.43%
1990	1,062	−1.73%
1999	932	−1.44%
2007	848	−1.17%
2012	893	+1.04%
2017	835	−1.33%
2023	860	+0.49%
Source: INSEE

Ushant's only village is Lambaol (Lampaul), which has the mayoral office, school and post office. People also live in the outlying hamlets of Feuteun Vélen, Frugullou, Pen ar Lan, and Porsguen.

== Climate ==
Ushant's climate is oceanic (Cfb) under the Köppen climate classification: temperate, fully humid, temperate summer, with generally cool, rainy winters and temperate, drier summers.

Comparison of local Meteorological data with other cities in France
Town	Sunshine (hours/yr)	Rain (mm/yr)	Snow (days/yr)	Storm (days/yr)	Fog (days/yr)
National average	1,973	770	14	22	40
Ushant	N/A	761.5	3.4	5.1	49.3
Paris	1,661	637	12	18	10
Nice	2,724	767	1	29	1
Strasbourg	1,693	665	29	29	56
Brest	1,605	1,211	7	12	75

Climate data for Ushant (1991–2020 averages, extremes 1995–present)
Month	Jan	Feb	Mar	Apr	May	Jun	Jul	Aug	Sep	Oct	Nov	Dec	Year
Record high °C (°F)	15.1 (59.2)	16.6 (61.9)	18.4 (65.1)	22.5 (72.5)	24.1 (75.4)	27.7 (81.9)	31.5 (88.7)	29.3 (84.7)	26.2 (79.2)	24.3 (75.7)	18.1 (64.6)	16.0 (60.8)	31.5 (88.7)
Mean daily maximum °C (°F)	10.4 (50.7)	10.4 (50.7)	11.5 (52.7)	13.2 (55.8)	15.2 (59.4)	17.5 (63.5)	19.3 (66.7)	19.6 (67.3)	18.2 (64.8)	15.9 (60.6)	13.0 (55.4)	11.1 (52.0)	14.6 (58.3)
Daily mean °C (°F)	8.6 (47.5)	8.4 (47.1)	9.3 (48.7)	10.7 (51.3)	12.7 (54.9)	14.9 (58.8)	16.5 (61.7)	16.8 (62.2)	15.7 (60.3)	13.8 (56.8)	11.2 (52.2)	9.3 (48.7)	12.3 (54.1)
Mean daily minimum °C (°F)	6.8 (44.2)	6.4 (43.5)	7.2 (45.0)	8.2 (46.8)	10.2 (50.4)	12.3 (54.1)	13.8 (56.8)	14.1 (57.4)	13.2 (55.8)	11.7 (53.1)	9.4 (48.9)	7.5 (45.5)	10.1 (50.2)
Record low °C (°F)	−2.5 (27.5)	−3.3 (26.1)	−0.8 (30.6)	1.9 (35.4)	3.8 (38.8)	8.0 (46.4)	9.8 (49.6)	10.5 (50.9)	8.3 (46.9)	5.3 (41.5)	2.8 (37.0)	−0.2 (31.6)	−3.3 (26.1)
Average precipitation mm (inches)	92.7 (3.65)	75.3 (2.96)	56.1 (2.21)	58.2 (2.29)	50.0 (1.97)	48.6 (1.91)	47.2 (1.86)	60.5 (2.38)	52.1 (2.05)	80.7 (3.18)	95.1 (3.74)	96.1 (3.78)	812.6 (31.99)
Average precipitation days (≥ 1.0 mm)	15.6	12.4	11.8	10.1	8.0	8.2	8.3	9.5	8.9	12.7	16.0	16.0	137.6
Source: Meteo France

== Sights ==
The Créac'h Lighthouse (Phare du Creach) is reputedly the most powerful in Europe. Ouessant is the French system name for Plymouth in the British system of the Shipping Forecast.

== Cultural ties to Scotland ==
In 2007, Ushant hosted a Scottish book festival and subsequently created its own tartan registered with the Scottish Register of Tartans; in August 2010, the islanders were reported to be seeking to establish cultural links with a Scottish island. Member of the Scottish Parliament for the Highlands and Islands Rob Gibson welcomed the suggestion.

== Transport ==
Ushant, nearby islands, and the NW coast of France

Ushant is connected to the French mainland by air (via the Ushant Airport) and sea. Passenger ferries of the Penn Ar Bed company operate from Brest and Le Conquet year-round, and from Camaret in summer, stopping at the island of Molène en route. Finistair operates flights on Cessna 208 planes from Brest Bretagne Airport.

== Fauna ==
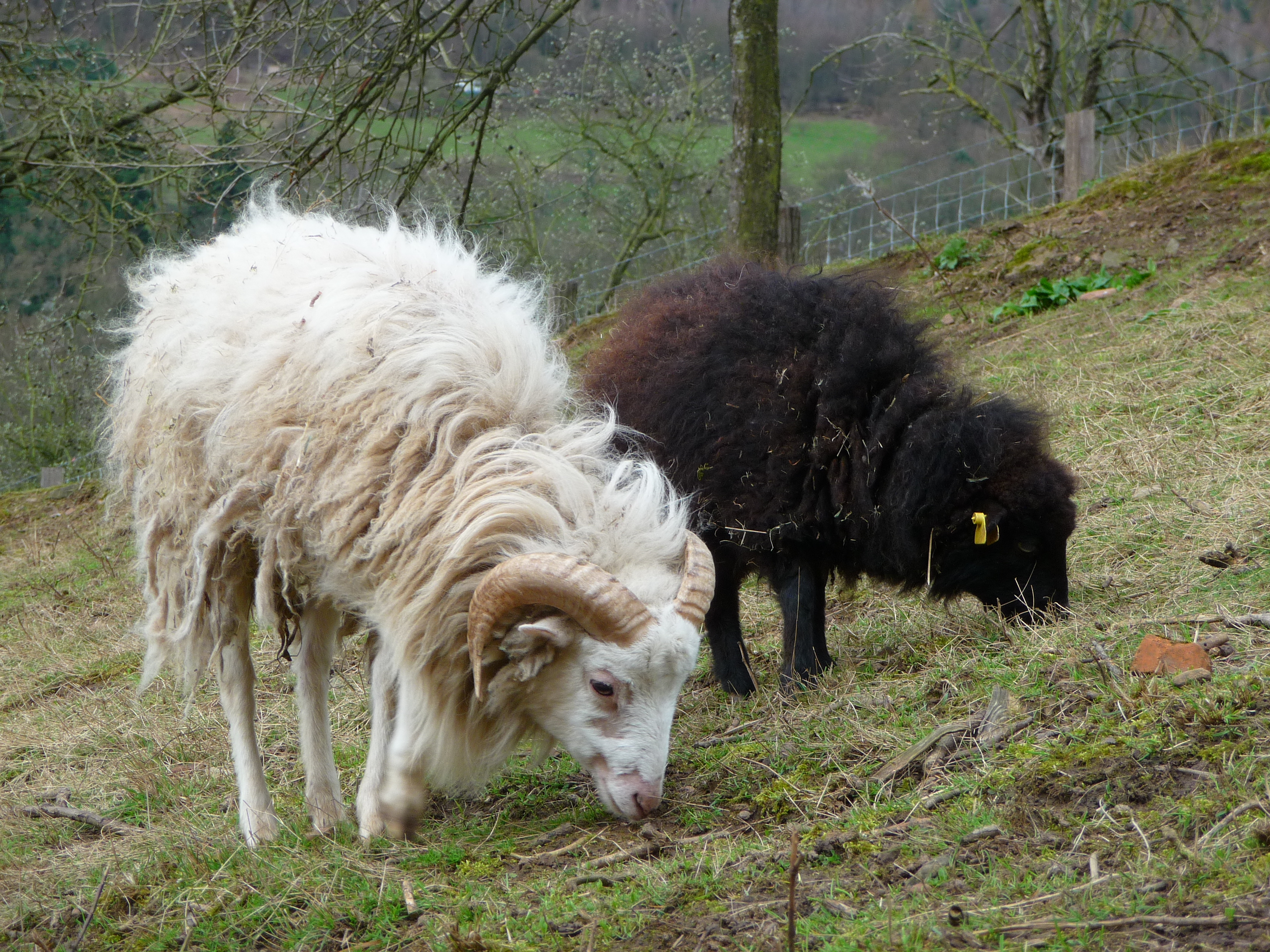
Ouessant sheep

Ouessant sheep form a rare breed, originating here. These northern European short-tailed sheep were ubiquitous in northern Europe through Roman times but now survive in few places, including Ushant, remote islands and mountains of Britain and Scandinavia, and some places around the Baltic Sea. They are one of the smallest breeds of domestic sheep. They are usually black or dark brown (a few are white), and are kept elsewhere as a heritage breed.

Ushant's isolation has helped the conservation of the European dark bee (Apis mellifera mellifera), unaffected by pollution, pesticides and Varroa parasites. In the rest of France, it has been replaced by Apis mellifera ligustica. As a side effect, populations of the bee louse, Braula coeca, that has elsewhere perished through pesticides are still found on Ushant. The association Conservatoire de l'Abeille Noire Bretonne is attempting to conserve and increase the numbers of the European dark bee, intending to reintroduce it in Western France.

Ushant and the Molène archipelago support Europe's southernmost colony of grey seals. They are mostly at Point Cadoran, on Ushant's north coast, where the strong currents keep the water temperature below 15 degrees Celsius (59 °F), the warmest that the seals can tolerate.

== Media and art references ==
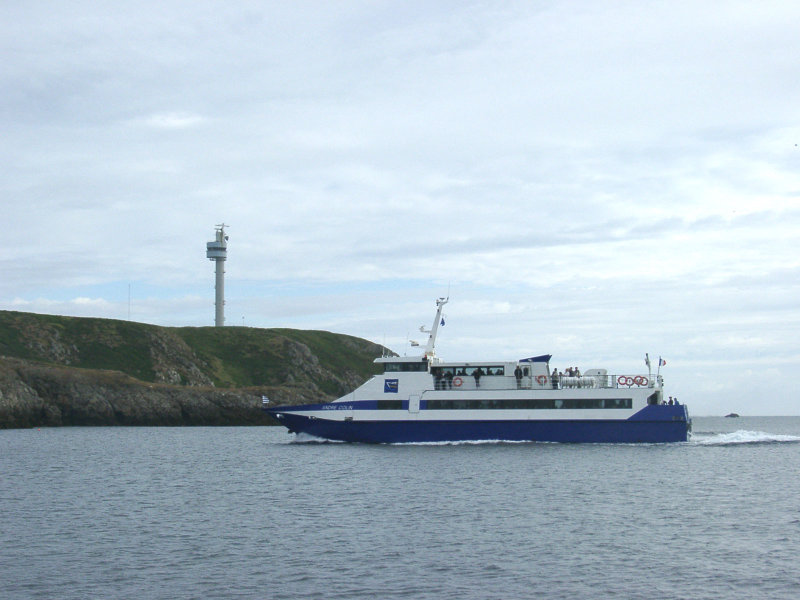
Ferry approaching Ushant

- The island figures in Le Sang de la sirène (The Blood of the Siren, 1901) by Anatole Le Braz.
- It is mentioned in the chorus of the sea shanty Spanish Ladies ("From Ushant to Scilly is thirty-five leagues").
- Rudyard Kipling mentions it in his poem Anchor Song.
- The island is mentioned in Greenmantle (1916), a novel by the Scottish author John Buchan.
- Charles Tournemire's Symphony No. 2, completed in 1909, was inspired by and named for the island.
- The 1910 novel Das Meer by German author Bernhard Kellermann takes place on the island. Features such as Phare du Creach and Port du Stiff are highly defined. The main character stays at the la Villa des tempêtes, in ruins today.
- The secret of the seas (Le Secret des Eaux: Ouessant), is a 1923 novel by André Savignon set on Ushant.
- "Lord Ushant" is the title given the heir to the Duchy of Tintagel (Cornwall) in Edith Wharton's The Buccaneers (1938).
- Ushant is mentioned in George Orwell's diaries, in passing.
- A ship from Ushant is mentioned in the WWII Brest destruction commemorative ode Barbara by French poet Jacques Prévert.
- Ushant is the autobiography of the American poet and novelist Conrad Aiken, published in 1952.
- Ushant is one of the many French islands referenced in Laurent Voulzy's Belle-Île-en-Mer, Marie-Galante, a major hit in France since its release in 1986.
- Ushant appears over and over in works of Patrick O'Brian as to the whereabouts and course of ships in his book series.
- Ushant occasionally appears as a landfall in C. S. Forester's novels about Horatio Hornblower.
- Mystery book Act of Mercy by Peter Tremayne is set in 666 AD Ushant and elsewhere.
- Ushant is the setting of the 2004 French film L'Équipier (English title: The Light) directed by Philippe Lioret.
- Father Truitard, a character in Bruce Chatwin's The Viceroy of Ouidah, spent "years communing with the waves and petrels on the island of Ushant".
- Composer Yann Tiersen made the album Eusa in 2016 after moving to Ushant. Each track is named after a location on the island. He also recorded his third album "Le Phare" in a rented house on Ushant.
- A trip to the island forms an important plot point in Éric Rohmer's 1996 film A Summer's Tale.
- Ushant was featured in some of the scenes of the 1929 film Finis Terræ.

== Book awards ==
The island awards annual literary prizes to worldwide writers.

== See also ==
- Battle of Ushant (disambiguation)
- Communes of the Finistère department
- Parc naturel régional d'Armorique
- List of the works of Charles Cottet depicting scenes of Brittany
