= Vannes Airport =

Vannes Airport Advanced Landing Ground (ALG) A-33
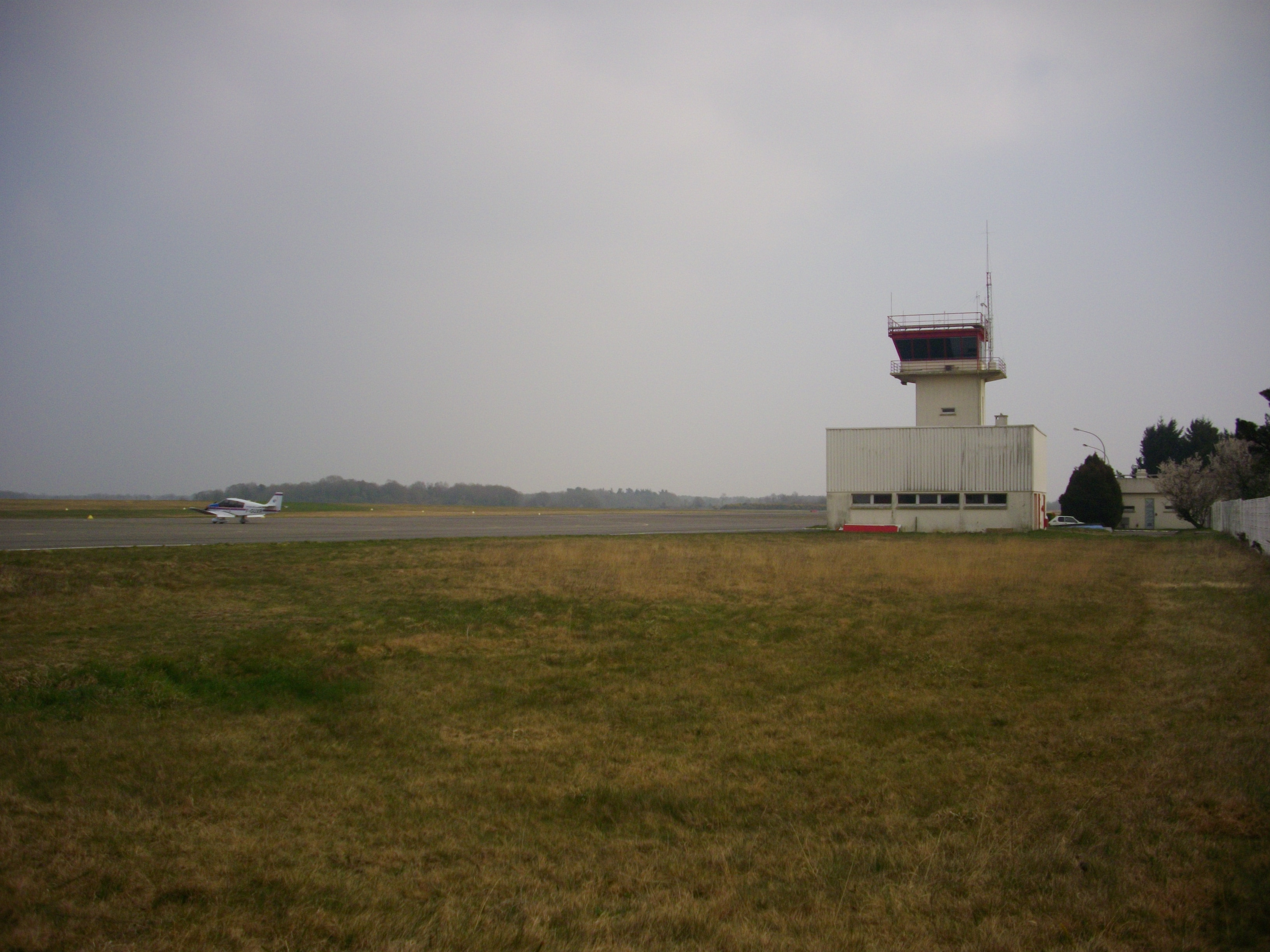
- IATA: VNE; ICAO: LFRV

Summary
- Airport type: Public
- Operator: SNC-Lavalin
- Location: Meucon, France
- Elevation AMSL: 440 ft (130 m)
- Coordinates: 47°43′10″N 002°43′24″W
- Website: vannes.aeroport.fr

Map
- Location of Meucon Airport LFRV (France)

Runways
Direction	Length		Surface
Direction	ft	m	Surface
04/22	5,020	1,530	Asphalt
08/26	3,363	1,025	Grass
- worldaerodata.com Meucon

Vannes Airport (aéroport de Vannes-Golfe du Morbihan) is a regional airport in France (IATA: VNE, ICAO: LFRV). It supports general aviation.

== History ==
Vannes airport was a civil airport built prior to World War II.

=== German use during World War II ===
Seized by the Germans in June 1940 during the Battle of France, Meucon airport was used as a Luftwaffe military airfield during the occupation. Known units assigned (all from Luftflotte 3, Fliegerkorps IV):

- Kampfgruppe 100 (KGr 100) 9 August 1940 – 17 June 1941 Heinkel He 111H (Fuselage Code 6N+)
- Jagdgeschwader 53 (JG 53) 8 June-13 August 1941 Messerschmitt Bf 109E-1
- Jagdgeschwader 51 (JG 51) Oct 1941-January 1942 Messerschmitt Bf 109E-1
- Jagdgeschwader 2 (JG 2) 22 November 1942-October 1943 Focke-Wulf Fw 190A

KGr 100 took part in operations over England during the Battle of Britain (10 July–31 October 1940). JG 53, JG 51 and JG 2 were interceptor units against Allied bomber operations over occupied Europe.

Vannes was attacked on several missions by United States Army Air Force Eighth Air Force bombers during 1943.

=== Allied use ===
The airport was liberated by Allied ground forces about 10 August 1944 during the Northern France Campaign. Almost immediately, the USAAF IX Engineering Command 850th Engineer Aviation Battalion cleared the airport of mines and destroyed Luftwaffe aircraft. Runway bomb craters were filled with gravel or various types of debris and covered by Tarmac. Subsequently, Vannes/Meucon Airport became a USAAF Ninth Air Force combat airfield, designated as "A-33" about 29 August.

As the airport was in the rear area when repaired and opened, the Americans used it as a defensive field, stationing the 425th Night Fighter Squadron, flying P-61 Black Widows from 18 August though 11 September 1944 flying night air defense missions. Once the Luftwaffe threat was diminished in the area, the night fighters were moved east and it became a resupply and evacuation airfield for casualties to be treated, prior to being moved to England or the United States.

=== Current ===
The airport was returned to French civil control after the war ended on 20 June 1945. The heavily damaged airport required much reconstruction, and the main runway was refurbished and repaved with asphalt. Today it remains a regional civil airport. The former secondary (13/31) runway is now a concrete parking apron and still shows some asphalt patches applied over wartime bomb craters left by the Eighth Air Force. A grass runway (08/26) is of postwar vintage.

== Airlines and destinations ==
Airlines	Destinations
Finist'air	Seasonal: Belle Île

== See also ==
- Advanced Landing Ground
