= 184th AAA Battalion (United States) =

184th AAA Gun Battalion
- Active: 1943–1945
- Country: USA
- Branch: Army
- Type: Anti-Aircraft Artillery
- Equipment: 90 mm anti-aircraft gun M1; M4 tractor
- Engagements: Defense of London, Paris, and Antwerp; Battle of the Bulge
- Decorations: Belgian Croix de Guerre ribbon with Fourragère

Commanders
- Commanding Officer: Lt. Col. Julian S. Albergotti
- Executive Officer: Major Clair L. Johnson

The 184th AAA Gun Battalion was an American antiaircraft artillery battalion of World War II.

The 184th was activated in 1943 as part of the reorganization of the 61st Coast Artillery Regiment. After training in England, it took part in the air defense of London in 1944. Shortly after D-Day, the 184th landed at Omaha Beach in Normandy, where they defended the beach as well as the port of Cherbourg from Luftwaffe air attacks. After a two-month stay in Paris, the battalion was moved into positions around Antwerp, Belgium to defend the important port against German V-1 attacks. As the Battle of the Bulge progressed, the 184th was moved to a position on the Meuse River, where in addition to its normal anti-aircraft role, it was prepared to provide field artillery support as well. Returning to Antwerp in early 1945, the 184th was able to earn more victories against V-1s than any other AAA unit in the region. In April 1945, the 184th moved into Germany, where they defended bridges over the Rhine River. After V-E Day, the unit moved into the heart of Germany to take part in disarmament duties.

== Organization ==
The 184th – like most American AAA battalions in Europe – was never permanently attached to any one parent unit. Instead, they were assigned to various organizations on an as-needed basis. Batteries were also attached individually to other units, and batteries from other AAA battalions were attached to the 184th as needed.

The 184th was divided into four batteries: A, B, C, and D. Each battery had 4 90mm Antiaircraft guns. The unit also included a headquarters battery, that was responsible for the overall operation of the battalion. The 184th was classified as a "mobile" battalion, which meant it provided its own means of transporting its guns and troops, instead of relying on a separate transportation unit. The M4 tractor was used for moving the 90 mm guns.

== Activation and training ==
The 61st Coast Artillery Regiment – after spending 18 months training in Iceland – arrived in Scotland on 8 August 1943, disembarking in the mouth of the River Clyde near Glasgow. They then moved by train to the south of England in the county of Devon, where they were stationed at Camp Heathfield in Honiton. It was here on 10 August 1943 that the 61st Coast Artillery Regiment, 1st Battalion was renamed the 184th AAA Gun Battalion. The new unit spent the next several months training on the new 90mm guns and conducting field maneuvers, moving from camp to camp with some regularity.

Organizational structure:

- 21 December 1943: the 184th was attached to the 49th AAA Brigade.

== London ==
On 1 January 1944, Battery A was detached from the rest of the battalion and took up a position on Lippits Hill, 10 miles (16 km) northeast of London to take an active role in the defense of London. The remaining batteries, after completing mobile training, were stationed around London as of 3 March 1944. Headquarters Battery took up position with Battery A at Lippits Hill, Batteries B and C were moved to Middlesex county north and northeast of London, respectively. Battery D was stationed on an island in the Thames River 35 miles (56 km) east of London.

Shortly thereafter, Battery A was replaced at Lippits Hill by Battery B of the 115th AAA Battalion in order to perform the training they had missed while on duty defending London. They returned to their former position on 21 April. During their time defending London, the 184th fired a total of 875 rounds of 90mm ammunition and were credited with 2 enemy planes shot down.

Organizational structure:

- 14 March – 21 April 1944: Battery B, 115th AAA Battalion was attached to the 184th
- 16 March – 21 April 1944: Battery A of the 184th was attached to the 115th AAA Battalion, 108th AAA Group

== Normandy ==
The 184th arrived at Southampton on 9 June 1944 in preparation for the cross-channel trip to the mainland, but did not leave for Normandy until 16–18 June. Batteries A, C, and D were all offloaded on Omaha Beach between 17 and 20 June, but Battery B and HQ Battery were prevented from landing by strong storms until 25 June. The unit was located about 5 miles (8.0 km) inland and had the mission of protecting the beach from Luftwaffe air attacks against the Allied shipping that was still offloading personnel and supplies. These raids took place mainly at night, due to the daytime air superiority enjoyed by the Allies. During their time at Omaha Beach, the 184th was credited with five confirmed planes shot down, with an additional four probable kills.

The 184th left the Omaha Beach area on 2 August 1944 and moved to the port of Cherbourg, where they were stationed to the west of the city. They remained here only until the end of August, and saw little action. They turned over their positions to British units 23–24 August. From 26 August – 3 September 1944, the 184th was in a defensive position around the town of Rennes in Brittany, but again, saw no action

Organizational structure:

- 4 May – 2 August 1944: the 184th was attached to the 49th AAA Brigade, 18th AAA Group, 1st Army Group
- 4 May – 2 August 1944: logistical support was provided by ADSEC
- 17 – 25 June 1944: Batteries A, C, and D were attached to the 413th AAA Gun Battalion
- 2–7 August 1944: the 184th was placed directly under the command of ADSEC
- 7 August: the 184th was attached to the IX Air Defense Command

== Paris ==
The 184th left Rennes on 4 September 1944 and travelled to Paris, where they arrived on 6 September. They took up positions southeast of the French capital. Battery B was set up in an old French fort, while the other batteries occupied various former German anti-aircraft sites. Even though Paris had been liberated on 25 August, it was feared that it might still be the target of German air raids. However, once again, the 184th saw no action during their two-month stay in Paris.

Organizational structure:

- 7 August – 9 November 1944: the 184th was attached to the IX Air Defense Command
- 16 September – 9 November 1944: the 6901st Provisional Trucking Company was formed using men and vehicles from the 184th; they were tasked with moving supplies from Cherbourg to points inland

== Antwerp ==
On 6 November 1944, the 184th left Paris and travelled for two days to the region of Antwerp, Belgium to protect the vital port against attack from German V-1s. Montgomery and the British 21st Army Group had captured Antwerp on 4 September, and it was one of few ports that had not been damaged by the retreating Germans. Other options, such as Cherbourg or the Normandy invasion beaches were more than 500 miles (800 km) behind the front lines by that time. Antwerp had the capacity to supply six different U.S., British, and Canadian armies, and was much closer to the fighting. The Germans realized it was necessary to destroy Antwerp if they had any hope of cutting off the Allied supply line. To that end, the first V-1 attack on the port was launched on 24 October.

When the 184th arrived on 9 November, they took up position about 14 miles (23 km) east of the port as part of a "gun belt" of anti-aircraft units that had been set up side by side in an arc across the expected line of attack. The batteries of the 184th were sited about 1,000 yards (910 m) apart and during the action that followed, normally all fired on the same target to maximize the chances of destroying the incoming V-1s. Between 9 November and 21 December, the 184th claimed 13 V-1s destroyed in the air, while causing another 48 to crash.

Organizational structure:

- 9 November – 21 December 1944: the 184th was placed under the command of the 50th AAA Brigade (also known as "Antwerp X"), which was in turn attached to the British 21st Army Group.

== Battle of the Bulge ==
On 16 December 1944, the German army launched Operation Watch on the Rhine, by attacking the Allied front line in the lightly defended Ardennes Forest region of Belgium, with the object of capturing Antwerp to disrupt the flow of supplies to the Allied armies. By 20 December, advance elements of the 2nd Panzer Division had penetrated 25 miles (40 km), reaching the Ourthe River near the town of Ourtheville. To meet this threat, any units in the region that could be spared were sent to stop the German advance. The AAA battalions around Antwerp were no exception, and on 21 December, the 184th was underway to Namur, Belgium, which was strategically located at the confluence of the Meuse and Sambre rivers. They arrived the next day and set up positions in the hills surrounding the town. Since American AAA units were trained to use their 90mm guns against ground targets as well as aircraft, the 184th was prepared to provide field artillery support to the infantry and tank units in Namur, should the need arise. This never proved necessary – while the 2nd Panzer Division reached the town of Dinant, about 15 miles (24 km) south of Namur on 23 December, its advance was halted there by counterattacks from Patton's Third Army.

While in Namur, the 184th performed its primary AAA role by defending the bridges over the Meuse. Between 24 and 31 December, the 184th was in action almost every night against attacking German bombers. During this time, they fired 1341 rounds of 90mm ammunition, including 721 rounds with the new proximity fuze. They were credited with 10 enemy planes confirmed shot down, with another 5 probable kills.

Organizational structure:

- 21 December 1944 – 4 January 1945: the 184th was placed under the operational command of the 12th Army Group

== Return to Antwerp ==
With the threat subsiding in the Ardennes, the 184th turned over their positions in Namur to the 143rd AAA Gun Battalion on 3–4 January 1945, and returned to the defense of Antwerp, this time setting up near the town of Meer, about 30 miles (48 km) northeast of Antwerp near the border with the Netherlands. The main direction of attack came from the northeast by this time, and the 184th had the good fortune of being positioned by itself in the first of several gun belts, about 15,000 yards (14,000 m) from the next AAA gun battalions in line. Because of this, they had the first opportunity at every V-1 that came from the main launching areas in the Netherlands.

There were only five days between 5 January – 29 March 1945, on which the 184th did not fire at oncoming V-1s. They shot down an average of 73% of the buzz bombs that flew over their positions, with a 100% score on 13 February. During a six-day stretch in February, the whole of Antwerp X claimed a kill ratio of over 97%, shooting down 89 out of 91 V-1s. The 184th fired a total of 75,500 90mm rounds, including more than 13,800 armed with a proximity fuze. They claimed 365 V-1 victories, more than any other AAA unit under the command of Antwerp X. For their participation in the defense of Antwerp, the 184th was twice cited in the Belgian Army Order of the Day, earning them the Belgian Croix de Guerre ribbon with Fourragère.

Organizational structure:

- 4 January – 16 April 1945: the 184th was fully reintegrated into the Antwerp X command.

== Germany ==
On 16 April 1945, the 184th left the Antwerp region and moved into Germany, reaching Mainz on 18 April. Batteries B, C, and D were positioned in Mainz to guard the Rhine River crossing. Battery A was moved 15 miles (24 km) north to the town of Bingen, where it performed the same duties until 26 April, when it returned to Mainz. The 184th remained here until Germany surrendered, and did not have any encounters with enemy planes during this time.

After V-E Day, the 184th took part in the disarming of German AAA sites. Their area of responsibility was in an area outlined by the cities Leipzig, Eisenach, Muhlhausen, and Magdeburg. This work began on 15 May 1945 and lasted through 24 June. The main objective was the gathering of anything of intelligence value, but from 28 July until the end of September, also included moving scrap material from the German AAA installations to dump sites.

During disarmament duties, many replacements joined the unit to offset the losses of officers and men being shipped back to the United States. A large contingent left between 30 May and 7 June; many more departed in August and September. The remainder of the unit was transferred stateside in October, ending the 184th AAA Gun Battalion's WWII operations.

Organizational structure:

- 16 April – 1 October 1945: the 184th was once again attached to the IX Air Defense Command
- 19 – 26 April 1945: Battery D, 119th AAA Battalion was attached to the 184th
- 19 – 26 April 1945: Battery A of the 184th was attached to the 133rd AAA Battalion

== Sources ==
- 184th AAA Gun Bn.: Iceland, England, France, Belgium, Holland, Germany. Fulda, Germany: Parzeller & Co. 1945.
- The Story of Antwerp X. 50 AAA Brigade, US Army. 1945.
- Symphony in B-Flak, A Historical Narrative of Battery B, 115th AAA Gun Battalion (Mobile). Regensburg, Germany: Friedrich Pustet. 1945.
- The Coast Defense Journal; Volume 23, Issue 2. Bel Air, MD: Coast Defense Study Group, Inc. May 2009.
- de Baene, Antoine L. (1948). Belgium Remembers and honors the US Armies of Liberation. Brussels, Belgium: J. Rozez, S.A.
- Zaloga, Steven J. (2010). Battle of the Bulge. Oxford, United Kingdom: Osprey Publishing Ltd.
