= Battle of Ushant =

Battle of Ushant may refer to:

- Battle of Ushant (1778), or "First Battle of Ushant", fought 100 miles (160 km) west of Ushant, a large but inconclusive engagement in the American Revolutionary War
- Action of 6 October 1779, a minor but famous and furious naval engagement (naval battle at Ushant, 1779) of the American Revolutionary War between the British HMS Quebec and the Surveillante.
- Action of 10 August 1780, a minor naval engagement that took place during the American Revolutionary War between a Royal Navy frigate and a French Navy frigate. This was the first engagement thought to involve the use of the carronade.
- Battle of Ushant (1781), or "Second Battle of Ushant", a convoy battle, also during the American Revolutionary War
- Battle of Ushant (1782), or the "Action of 20–21 April 1782", occurred in this region during the course of the American Revolutionary War.
- Glorious First of June, 1794, called both the "Third Battle of Ushant" and the "Fourth Battle of Ushant", fought 400 miles (640 km) west of Ushant during the French Revolutionary Wars
- Battle of Ushant (1944), a battle among the British, Canadian and Polish destroyers of the 10th Flotilla and the German destroyers of the 8th Narvik Flotilla, won by the Allies
