= Brest Bretagne Airport =

Brest Bretagne Airport Aéroport de Brest Bretagne
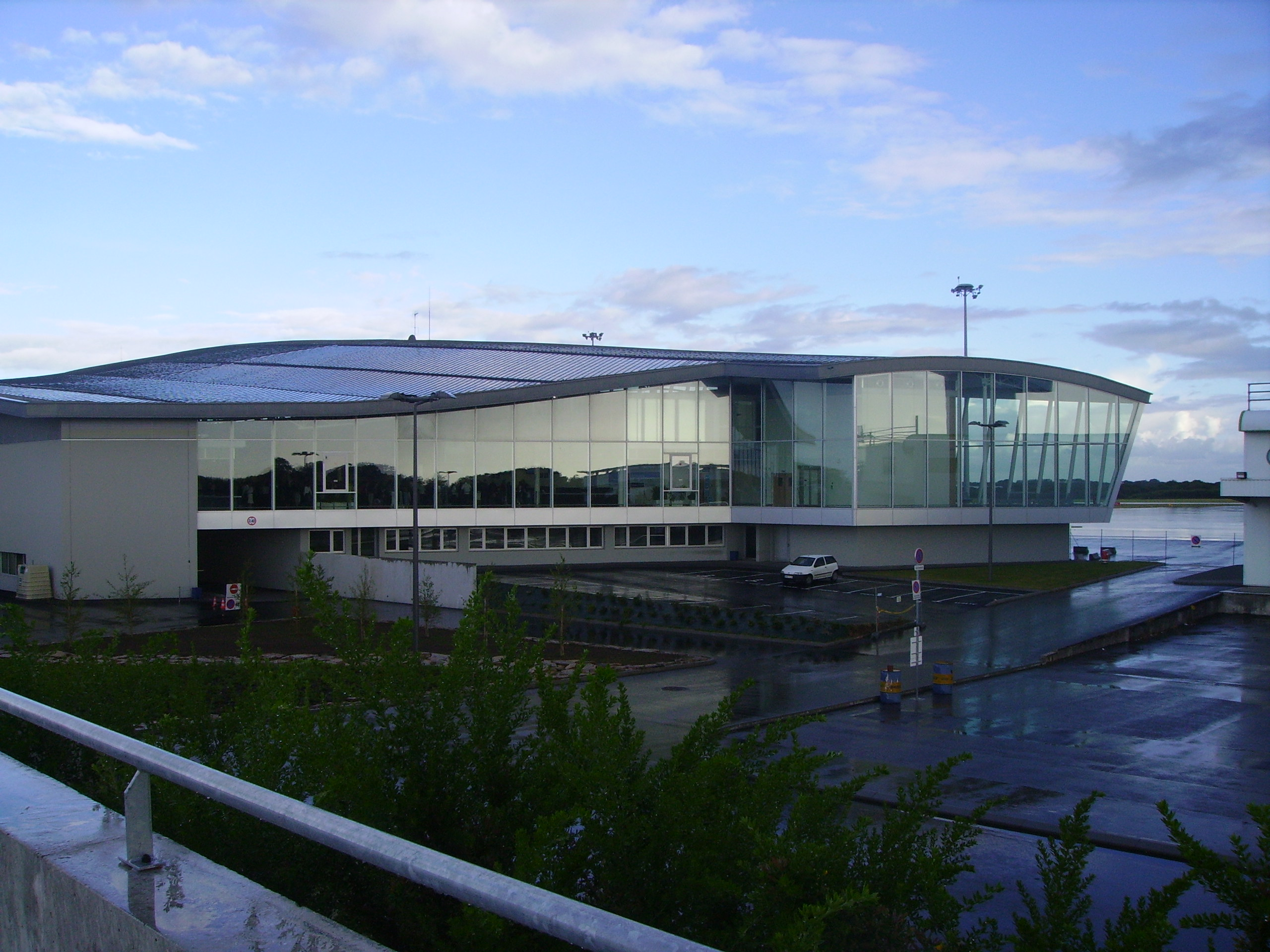
- IATA: BES; ICAO: LFRB

Summary
- Airport type: Public
- Operator: Chamber of Commerce
- Serves: Brest, France
- Location: Guipavas
- Elevation AMSL: 325 ft (99 m)
- Coordinates: 48°26′50″N 004°25′18″W
- Website: www.brest.aeroport.bzh

Map
- Location of airport in the Brittany region LFRB (France)

Runways
Direction	Length		Surface
Direction	m	ft	Surface
07R/25L	3,100	10,171	Asphalt
07L/25R	700	2,297	Asphalt

Statistics (2018)
- Passengers: 1,104,699
- Passenger traffic change: ▲5.6%
- Source: French AIP, Aeroport.fr

Brest Bretagne Airport (French: Aéroport de Brest Bretagne) (IATA: BES, ICAO: LFRB), formerly known as Brest Guipavas Airport, is an international airport serving Brest, France. It is located in the commune of Guipavas and 10.2 km (6.4 miles) northeast of Brest, within the département of Finistère.

== Overview ==
The main airlines serving Brest are Air France and its subsidiary HOP!, serving for the most part Paris. The airport has grown dramatically over the past decade thanks to charter airlines, as can be seen below.

== Airlines and destinations ==
The following airlines operate regular scheduled and charter flights at Brest Bretagne Airport:

Airlines	Destinations
Aegean Airlines	Seasonal: Heraklion
Aer Lingus	Seasonal: Dublin
Air France	Lyon, Paris–Charles de Gaulle; Seasonal: Biarritz
Chalair Aviation	Bordeaux; Seasonal: Kerry, Pau
EasyJet	Seasonal: London–Gatwick
Finist'air	Bordeaux, Ushant; Seasonal: Belle-Île, Jersey, Ushant, Vannes
Transavia	Agadir, Marrakesh, Marseille, Toulon, Toulouse; Seasonal: Porto
Volotea	Marseille, Montpellier, Nice; Seasonal: Ajaccio, Athens, Barcelona, Bastia, Faro, Figari, Heraklion, Lanzarote, Málaga, Menorca, Olbia, Palermo, Palma de Mallorca, Strasbourg, Tenerife–South

== Statistics ==
Year	Passengers	Change
1997	614,023	
1998	661,523	▲7.7%
1999	719,014	▲8.7%
2000	748,060	▲4.0%
2001	719,774	▼3.8%
2002	739,843	▲2.8%
2003	704,237	▼4.8%
2004	700,170	▼0.6%
2005	775,079	▲10.7%
2006	817,456	▲5.5%
2007	850,433	▲4.0%
2008	874,747	▲2.9%
2009	881,500	▲0.8%
2010	919,404	▲4.8%
2011	990,927	▲7.8%
2012	1,070,461	▲8.0%
2013	1,003,836	▼6.2%
2014	998,393	▼0.5%
2015	1,000,192	▲0.2%
2017	1,046,581	▲3.5%
