= 61st Air Defense Artillery Regiment =

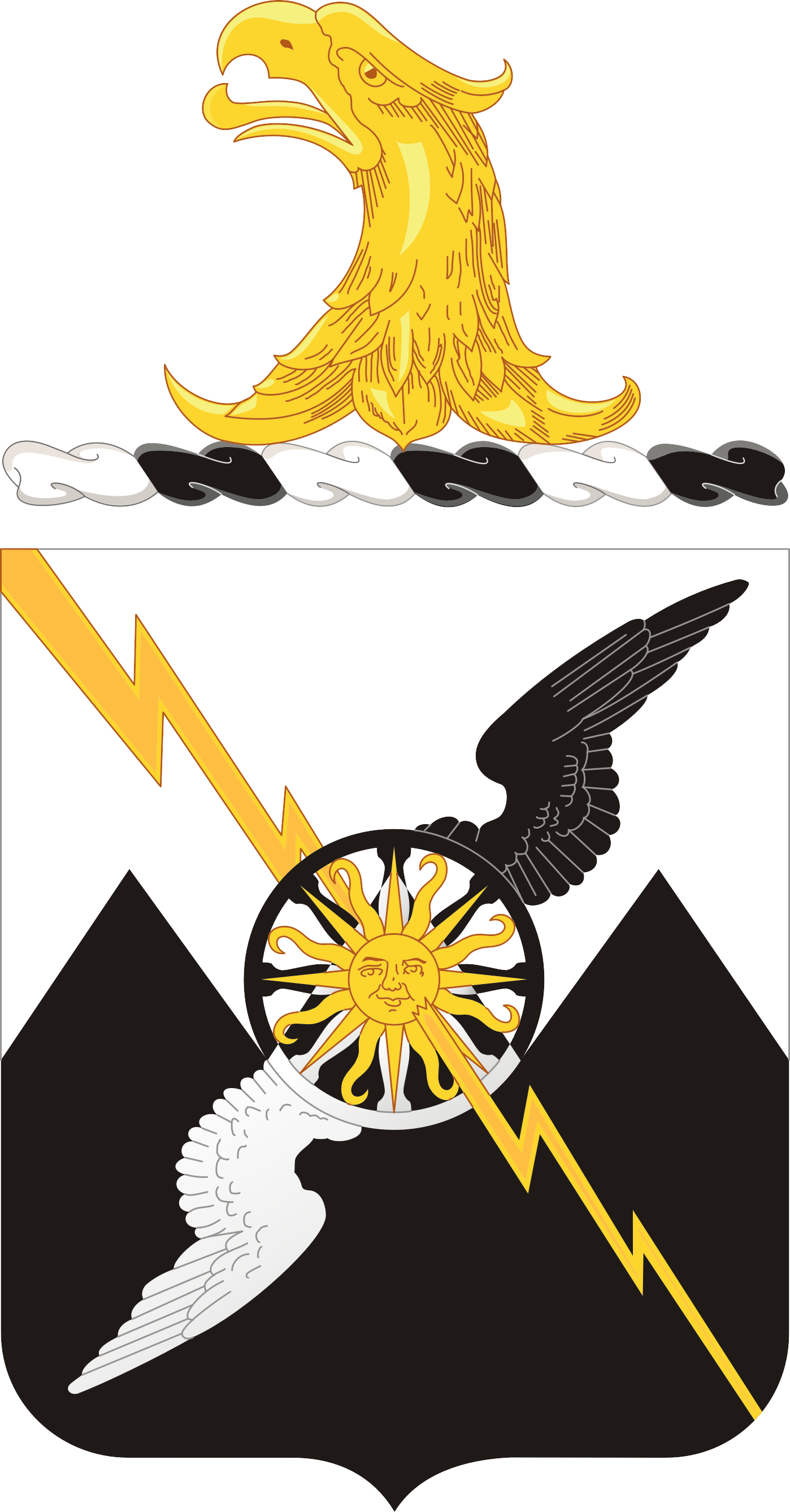
- Coat of arms
- Active: 1917
- Country: USA
- Branch: Army
- Type: Air defense artillery
- Size: Regiment
- Motto: "Non Est Ad Astra Mollis E Terris Via" (The Way To the Stars Is Not Easy)
- Mascot: Oozlefinch
- Decorations: Presidential Unit Citation

Insignia
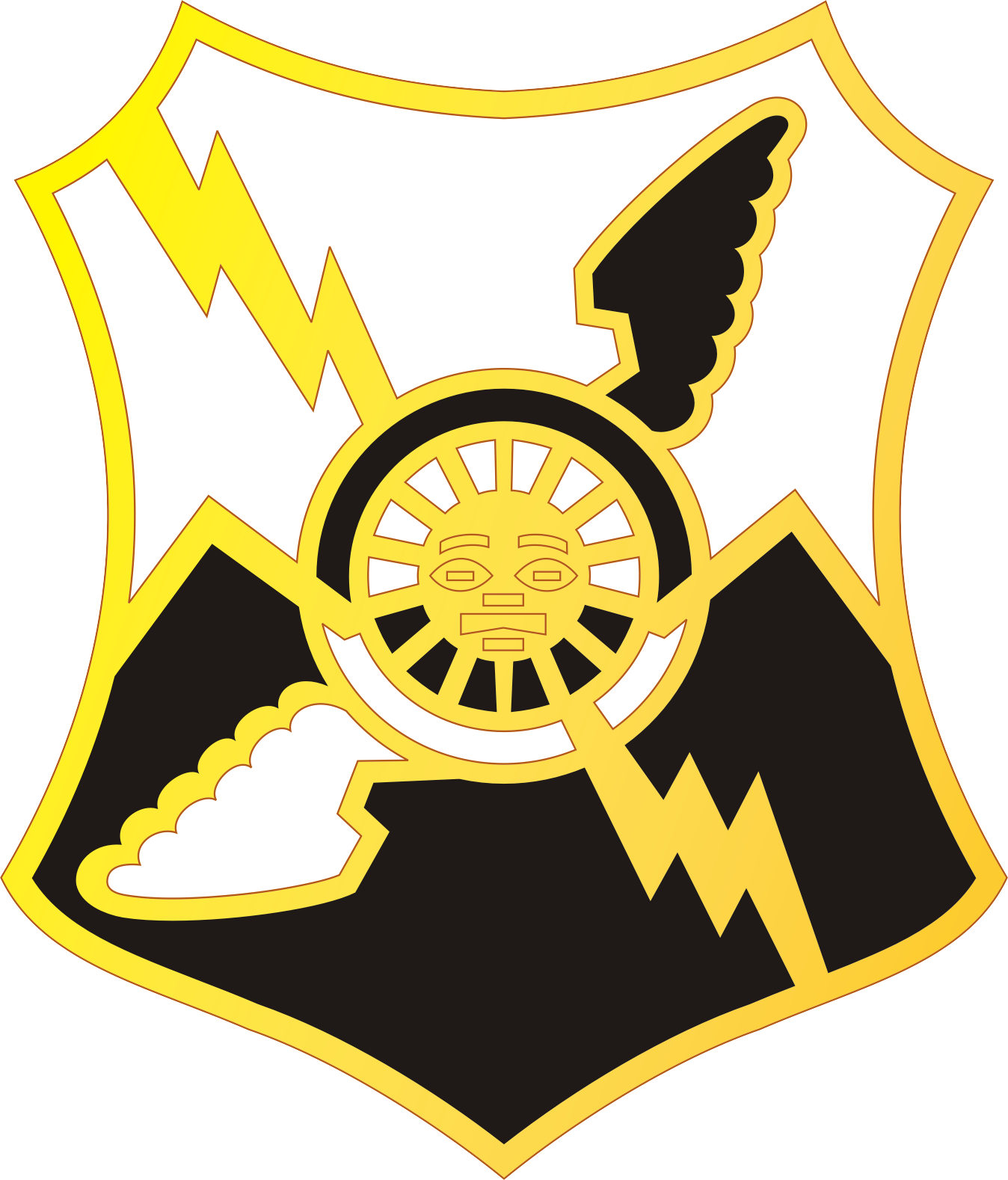
- Distinctive unit insignia

The 61st Air Defense Artillery Regiment is an air defense artillery regiment in the United States Army. The lineages of some of the units that initially made up the 61st Artillery (Coast Artillery Corps) (CAC) give the regiment's 1st Battalion campaign credit for the War of 1812.

== Lineage ==
Constituted and activated at Fort Moultrie 9 March 1918 as the 61st Artillery (CAC) from existing Regular and National Guard companies.

Demobilized at Camp Upton, New York, 28 February 1919.

Reconstituted 1 July 1921 as the 1st Antiaircraft Battalion and organized at Fort Monroe, Virginia.

On June 1, 1922, the 61st Artillery Battalion (AA) (CAC) was renamed.

Redesignated 61st Coast Artillery (AA) Regiment 30 June 1924 and reorganized as follows-

- HHB
- 1st BN HHB&CT
- A Battery
- B Battery
- C Battery
- D Battery
- 2nd BN HHB&CT
- E Battery from C Battery
- F Battery
- G Battery
- H Battery

Reassigned to Fort Sheridan 14 May 1930

- 61st Artillery (CAC) reconstituted and consolidated with 61st Coast Artillery Regiment 13 June 1930.

18 November 1939 Batteries C and D activated, 28 November 1939 2nd Battalion activated

- reassigned to New York for shipment overseas 15 December 1941
- Arrived Reykjavík, Iceland, 26 February 1942 and stationed at Camp Hilton.

10 July 1942 two detachments formed as separate Gun Battalions, and later redesignated 494th AAA Gun Battalion, and 495th AAA Gun Battalion.

- Regiment deployed to England 8 August 1943 and stationed at Honiton, Devon.

Regiment deactivated and broken up 14 June 1944 as follows-

- HHB deactivated (10 August 1943)
- 1st Battalion redesignated 184th AAA Gun Battalion
- 2nd Battalion redesignated 634th AAA (AW) Battalion
- 3rd Battalion redesignated 635th AAA (AW) Battalion

28 June 1950 consolidated with elements of the 61st Coast Artillery Regiment which was concurrently reconstituted to form the 61st Antiaircraft Artillery Group with the following composition:

- 92nd Group plus Hq 2nd Hq Batry, 6lst Regiment, became Hq and Hq Btry, 61st Group
- 184th Battalion plus Hq and Hq Battery, 61st Regiment, became the 6lst Battalion
- 634th Battalion plus 1st Battn, 61st Regiment, and the 39th Battalion became the 39th Battalion.
- 635th Battalion plus 3d Battn, 61st Regiment, became the 52d Battalion

Group Headquarters was established at Camp Stewart, Georgia.

- The 61st Battalion was redesignated as the 61st Antiaircraft Artillery Automatic Weapons Battalion on 21 August 1950 and assigned to the 6th Armored Division, Fort Leonard Wood, Missouri, where it was inactivated 16 March 1956.
- The 39th Battalion retained its designation as an Automatic Weapons Battalion until 16 May 1957 when it was inactivated at Southampton, Germany.
- The 52d Battalion was redesignated 20 October 1950 as an Automatic Weapons Battalion and served in the Korean War, being inactivated at Inchon 10 November 1951, reactivated at Camp Roberts, California, on 26 November 1952, and finally inactivated at Castle Air Force Base, California, on 15 June 1957.

reorganized and redesignated the 61st Artillery Regiment in 1958, and consolidated with the 436th Antiaircraft Artillery Missile Battalion (NIKE), the 548th Antiaircraft Artillery Missile Battalion (NIKE), and the 740th Antiaircraft Artillery Missile Battalion (NIKE) to form the present elements of the regiment. In addition, the 58th Antiaircraft Artillery Battery (EW) at Fort Bliss was reorganized and designated as Battery C (Electronic Warfare), 61st Artillery and assigned to Fourth United States Army.

== Distinctive unit insignia ==
=== Description ===
A Gold color metal and enamel device 7/8 inch (2.2 cm) in height overall blazoned as follows: Per fess dancette Argent and Sable, a thunderbolt bendwise Proper penetrating the chariot wheel of Helios winged with two dexter wings inverted forming a saltire with the first charged all counterchanged and upon the wheel the Sun in splendor of the third.

=== Symbolism ===
The aim and purpose of the unit are told in pictorial form by the story from Greek mythology of the winged chariot of Helios which was brought to Earth by a bolt of lightning thrown by Zeus. A summary of the story is as follows: Helios, the Sun, drove across the heavens from east to west daily, in a winged chariot drawn by the celestial horses. His son, Phaeton, in order to please his mother, and to satisfy those who doubted that he was really a son of Helios, obtained permission from his father to take his place in the chariot for one day. Phaeton had scarcely taken the reins when the celestial horses, despising their weak driver, turned out of their patch and set everything on fire. When the chariot came so near the Earth that the Ethiopians were blackened by the near approach of the Sun, Zeus, with a well-aimed bolt of lightning, wrecked the chariot and sent it plunging into the river Po. This is the first historical record of a hit being scored against an aerial target. The shield is divided by the saw tooth line taken from Lord Delaware's arms which were the basis of the coat of arms for the Coast-Defense of the Chesapeake. The upper part of the shield is white, the lower half black, for day and knight.

=== Background ===
The distinctive unit insignia was originally approved for the 61st Artillery Battalion on 16 November 1923. It was redesignated for the 61st Coast Artillery Regiment on 12 December 1939. The insignia was redesignated for the 61st Antiaircraft Artillery Automatic Weapons Battalion on 10 August 1955. It was redesignated for the 61st Artillery Regiment on 19 December 1958. It was redesignated for the 61st Air Defense Artillery Regiment effective 1 September 1971.

== Coat of arms ==
=== Blazon ===
- Shield

Per fess dancette Argent and Sable, a thunderbolt bendwise Proper penetrating the chariot wheel of Helios winged with two dexter wings inverted forming a saltire with the first charged all counterchanged and upon the wheel the sun in splendor of the third.

- Crest

On a wreath of the colors Argent and Sable, an eagle's head erased Or. Motto NON EST AD ASTRA MOLLIS E TERRIS VIA (The Way To the Stars Is Not Easy).

=== Symbolism ===
- Shield

The aim and purpose of the unit are told in pictorial form by the story from Greek mythology of the winged chariot of Helios which was brought to earth by a bolt of lightning thrown by Zeus. A summary of the story is as follows: Helios, the sun, drove across the heavens from east to west daily, in a winged chariot drawn by the celestial horses. His son, Phaeton, in order to please his mother, and to satisfy those who doubted that he was really a son of Helios, obtained permission from his father to take his place in the chariot for one day. Phaeton had scarcely taken the reins when the celestial horses, despising their weak driver, turned out of their patch and set everything on fire. When the chariot came so near the earth that the Ethiopians were blackened by the near approach of the sun, Zeus, with a well aimed bolt of lightning, wrecked the chariot and sent it plunging into the river Po. This is the first historical record of a hit being scored against an aerial target. The shield is divided by the saw tooth line taken from Lord Delaware's arms which were the basis of the coat of arms for the Coast-Defense of the Chesapeake. The upper part of the shield is white, the lower half black, for day and knight.

- Crest

The crest is from the arms of James Monroe with the colors reversed, a red eagle's head on a gold shield.

=== Background ===
The coat of arms was originally approved for the 1st Antiaircraft Battalion on 25 October 1921. It was redesignated for the 61st Battalion (Antiaircraft) on 10 June 1922. It was redesignated for the 61st Coast Artillery Regiment on 15 December 1939. The insignia was redesignated for the 61st Antiaircraft Artillery Automatic Weapons Battalion on 10 August 1955. It was redesignated for the 61st Artillery Regiment on 19 December 1958. It was redesignated for the 61st Air Defense Artillery Regiment effective 1 September 1971.

== Campaign streamers ==
World War I

- Streamer without inscription

World War II • Iceland, 1942 & 1943 • England, 1943 & 1944 • Normandy, 1944 • Northern France, 1944 • Ardennes-Alsace, 1944 • Rhineland, 1944 & 1945 • Central Europe, 1945 Korea

- CCF Intervention
- First UN Counteroffensive
- CCF Spring Offensive
- UN Summer-Fall Offensive

== Decorations ==
- United States Presidential Unit Citation (Army)
- Distinguished Unit Streamer embroidered ST VITH to 634th AAA(AW)btn
- Republic of Korea Presidential Unit Citation, streamer embroidered KOREA to 635th AAA(AW)btn
- Belgian Fourragere (1940) (awarded for defense of Antwerp) to 184th AAA(Gun)btn
