= 425th Fighter Squadron =

US Air Force unit

425th Fighter Squadron

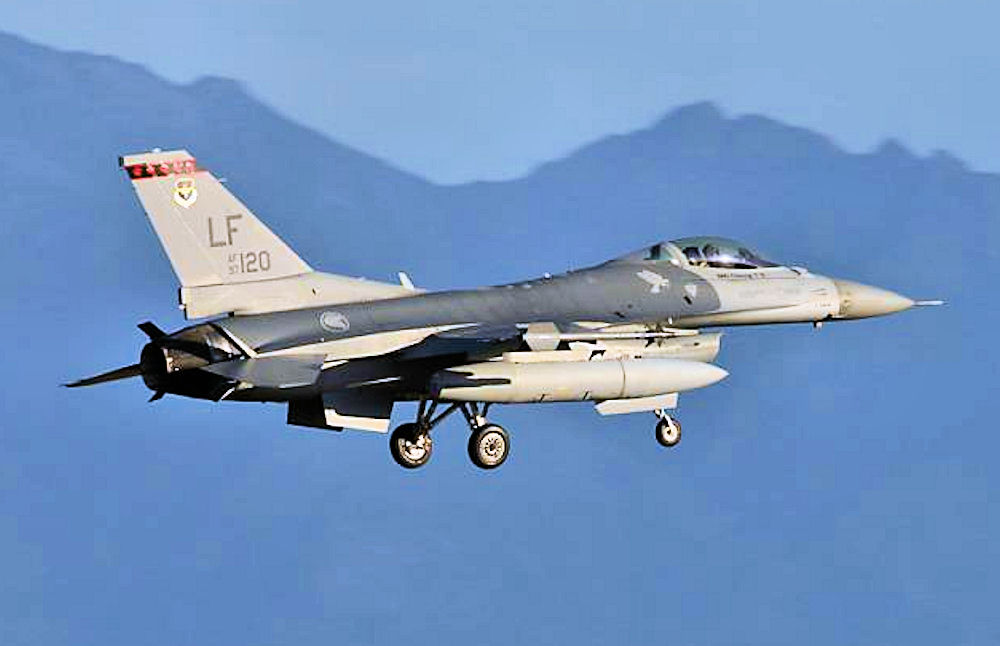
- 425th Fighter Squadron F-16 Fighting Falcon (Note: Aircraft is Lockheed Martin F-16CJ Block 52 Fighting Falcon serial 97-120)
- Active: 1943–1947; 1969–1989; 1992–present
- Country: United States
- Branch: United States Air Force
- Type: Squadron
- Role: Advanced weapons and tactics continuation training for Republic of Singapore Air Force F-16 pilots
- Part of: Air Combat Command
- Garrison/HQ: Luke Air Force Base, Arizona
- Nickname: Black Widows
- Motto: Freedom Fighters
- Engagements: European Theater of Operations

- Decorations: Air Force Outstanding Unit Award (14x); Citation in the Order of the Day, Belgian Army: 6 Jun-30 Sep 1944

Insignia
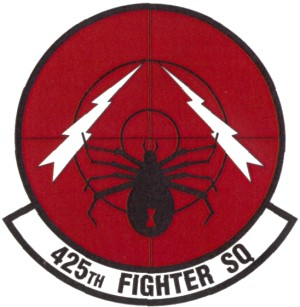
- Emblem of the 425th Fighter Squadron (approved 1 December 1992) (Note: Endicott gives the approval date as 7 January 1993.)

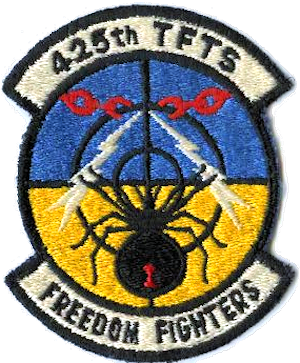
- Patch with 425th Tactical Fighter Training Squadron emblem (approved 11 June 1970)

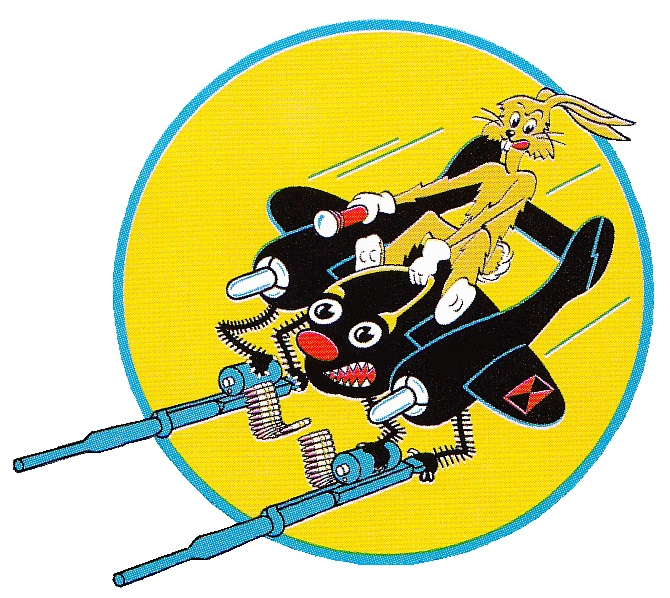
- 425th Night Fighter Squadron emblem (approved 4 May 1945)

The 425th Fighter Squadron is part of the 56th Operations Group at Luke Air Force Base, Arizona. It operates the General Dynamics F-16 Fighting Falcon aircraft conducting advanced fighter training for Republic of Singapore Air Force F-16 pilots.

The unit was originally formed as the 425th Night Fighter Squadron in 1943. After training in the United States, it was deployed to Ninth Air Force in England in the spring of 1944, prior to the D-Day landings in France. During the run-up to D-Day, the squadron trained with Royal Air Force night fighter units against Luftwaffe raiders who intruded the night skies over England. After the landings in France, the mission of the squadron became the air defense of Allied liberated territory. During the Battle of the Bulge, it also flew day and night interdiction missions against enemy troop movements, bridges and other targets of opportunity. It was inactivated in 1947.

The squadron was re-activated in 1969 as a Northrop F-5 Freedom Fighter training squadron for Republic of Vietnam Air Force pilots for transition training. After the end of United States involvement in the Vietnam War, it continued performed training of pilots from friendly nations who purchased the Northrop F-5E Tiger II as part of the United States Foreign Military Sales program. It was inactivated in 1989 when sales of the F-5 were ended.

== Mission ==
The 425th Fighter Squadron's mission is to provide advanced weapons and tactics continuation training for the Republic of Singapore Air Force General Dynamics F-16 Fighting Falcon pilots, weapon systems officers and maintenance personnel. RSAF aircrew and maintenance personnel are assigned to the 425th for two years, during which they receive advanced tactics training, participate in Exercise Red Flag, shoot live missiles at Combat Archer, and deploy to locations throughout the United States to participate in composite operations and dissimilar air combat exercises.

The tailband consists of black with red trim and red lion heads in a row. The lion head is in the same form that is in the RSAF insignia. The tail code is the standard 'LF' seen at Luke AFB but the country insignia is either RSAF or USAF depending on who owns the aircraft.

== History ==
=== World War II ===
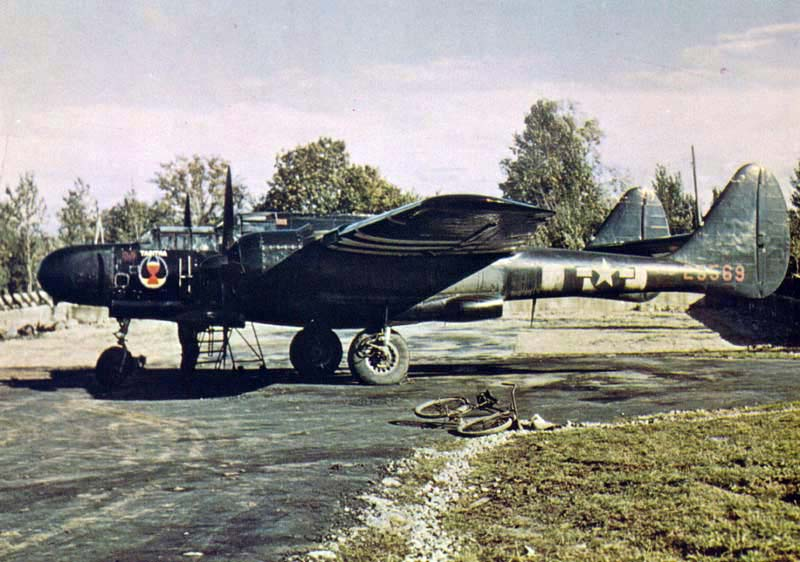
425th Squadron P-61 (Note: Aircraft is Northrop P-61A-10-NO serial 42-5569 "Tabitha" at RAF Scorton, England)

The squadron was established on 23 November 1943, as the 425th Night Fighter Squadron at Orlando AAB, Florida and activated on 1 December. It initially trained with the Douglas P-70 Havoc night fighter at Orlando, although it also trained with the Northrop YP-61 Black Widow. In January, training was interrupted when the night fighter school was moved from Florida to Hammer Army Airfield, California. After the relocation, the squadron completed its training in March 1944 The 425th was deployed to Ninth Air Force in England, being assigned to RAF Charmy Down.. Charmy Down become the home of three night fighter squadrons (422d, 423d, and 424th), however the squadron arrived un-equipped as the production Northrop P-61 Black Widows were late in arriving. Subsequently, the squadron had its aircrews posted to various RAF night fighter and signal schools for theatre indoctrination. Meanwhile, as there was no sign of the P-61s. the pilots kept up their flight time on Cessna UC-78s and de Havilland Mosquitoes.

The squadron was moved to RAF Scorton on 6 May. The original plan had been for all three night fighter squadrons to be on combat status with P-61s by D-Day, however the first P-61 didn't arrive until the end of May, about two weeks before the planned D-Day invasion of France. With the arrival of the German V-1 Flying Bombs over England after the invasion, the squadron trained with their Black Widows by intercepting the flying bombs. One of the greatest dangers involved in killing V-1s was the possibility of getting too close to the flying bomb when one fired at it, running the risk of damage to their own plane if the bomb exploded when hit.

Finally, on 18 August 1944, the squadron was considered to be operationally ready for night interception and moved up to Maupertu Airfield (A-15) in France. In France the squadron entered combat and began to perform night interception of intruding Luftwaffe bombers and night fighters. As the number of enemy night intruders was small, the squadron also performed offensive interdictionary attacks on Axis forces in France and the Low Countries, 1944, moving eastward through a series of Advanced Landing Grounds until operating from captured Luftwaffe bases in Germany during the spring of 1945. The squadron remained in Occupied Germany until September 1945 when it was demobilized, its personnel returning to the United States.

The unit was at several locations in California between 8 September 1945 and 1 September 1946, before arriving at McChord Field, Washington. The 425th was inactivated on 25 August 1947.

=== Cold War ===
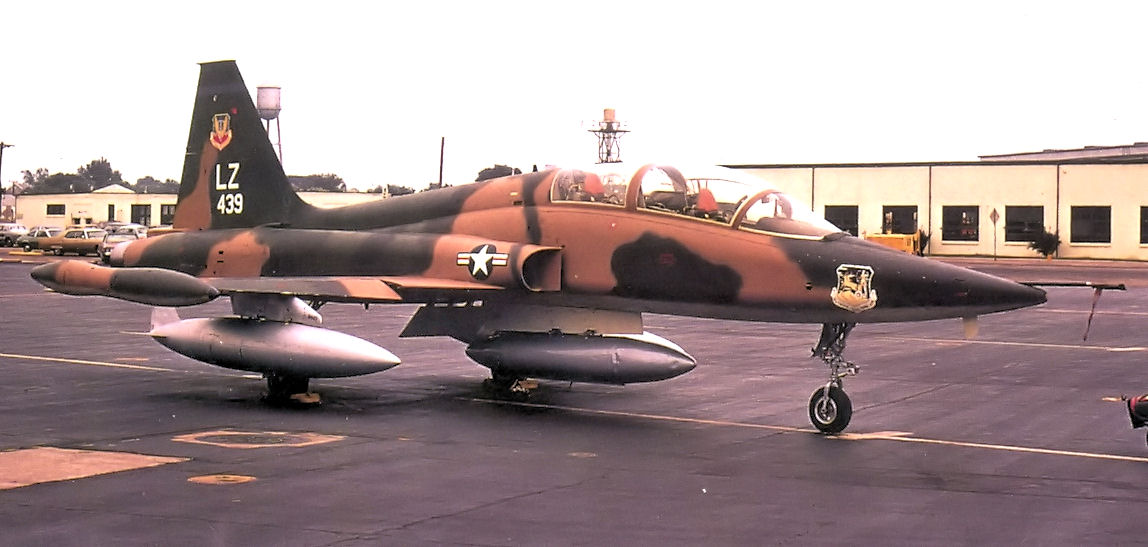
Squadron Northrop F-5B (Note: Aircraft is Northrop F-5B-50-NO Freedom Fighter serial 72-439. This airplane crashed near Tucson, AZ on 27 July 1982 following a collision with F-5 serial 73-899. All three occupants from both aircraft ejected but one was killed.)

The unit was reactivated at Williams Air Force Base, Arizona, on 15 October 1969 as the 425th Tactical Fighter Training Squadron and was assigned to the 58th Tactical Fighter Training Wing at Luke Air Force Base, Arizona, replacing the 4441st Combat Crew Training Squadron. Initially equipped with the Northrop F-5C Freedom Fighters of the 4441st, the squadron's initial mission was Undergraduate Pilot Training for Republic of Vietnam Air Force pilots in the aircraft.

In 1973 with the end of the Vietnam War, the squadron was assigned the task of training the aircrews of nations that had acquired the Northrop F-5E Tiger II under the Mutual Assistance Pact. The first F-5E Tiger II was delivered to the 425th on 6 April 1973. Although the USAF did not operate any F-5s at the time, the F-5E/Fs assigned to the 425th carried USAF serial numbers and were procured through normal aircraft procurement procedures and channels. Carried tail code "LZ".

Training proceeded at Williams throughout the 1970s. The 425th TFTS was reassigned to the 405th Tactical Training Wing as of 29 August 1979 when the 405th was activated at Luke, although the squadron remained at Williams. Pilots from over 20 nations who purchased the Tiger II were trained by the 425th.

In the late 1980s, the fleet of the F-5s was getting rather worn out as a result of sustained exposure to the rigors of air combat maneuvering and training. The problem began with the loss of F-5F 73-0890 based at Williams AFB. It was lost in a training accident in which it broke in half during maneuvering, killing both the student and instructor pilot. An investigation later showed that the most likely cause of the accident was a failure in the upper fuselage longeron, probably a result of fatigue or corrosion. An inspection later showed that about a third of the fleet had cracked or fatigued upper longerons. Although no stateside aircraft were grounded they were restrictions placed on operations in which pilots were warned not to exceed a certain G-load. Some repair kits had to be devised to overcome these problems, and the estimated cost of repair of the entire fleet was beginning to exceed a billion dollars.

In addition, the appearance of a new generation of Soviet fighters made it apparent that F-5Es could no longer perform adequately against Warsaw Pact threats. In June 1989, the squadron's F-5 training program terminated after having produced 1,499 graduates, and the 425th was inactivated 1 September 1989.

=== International training ===
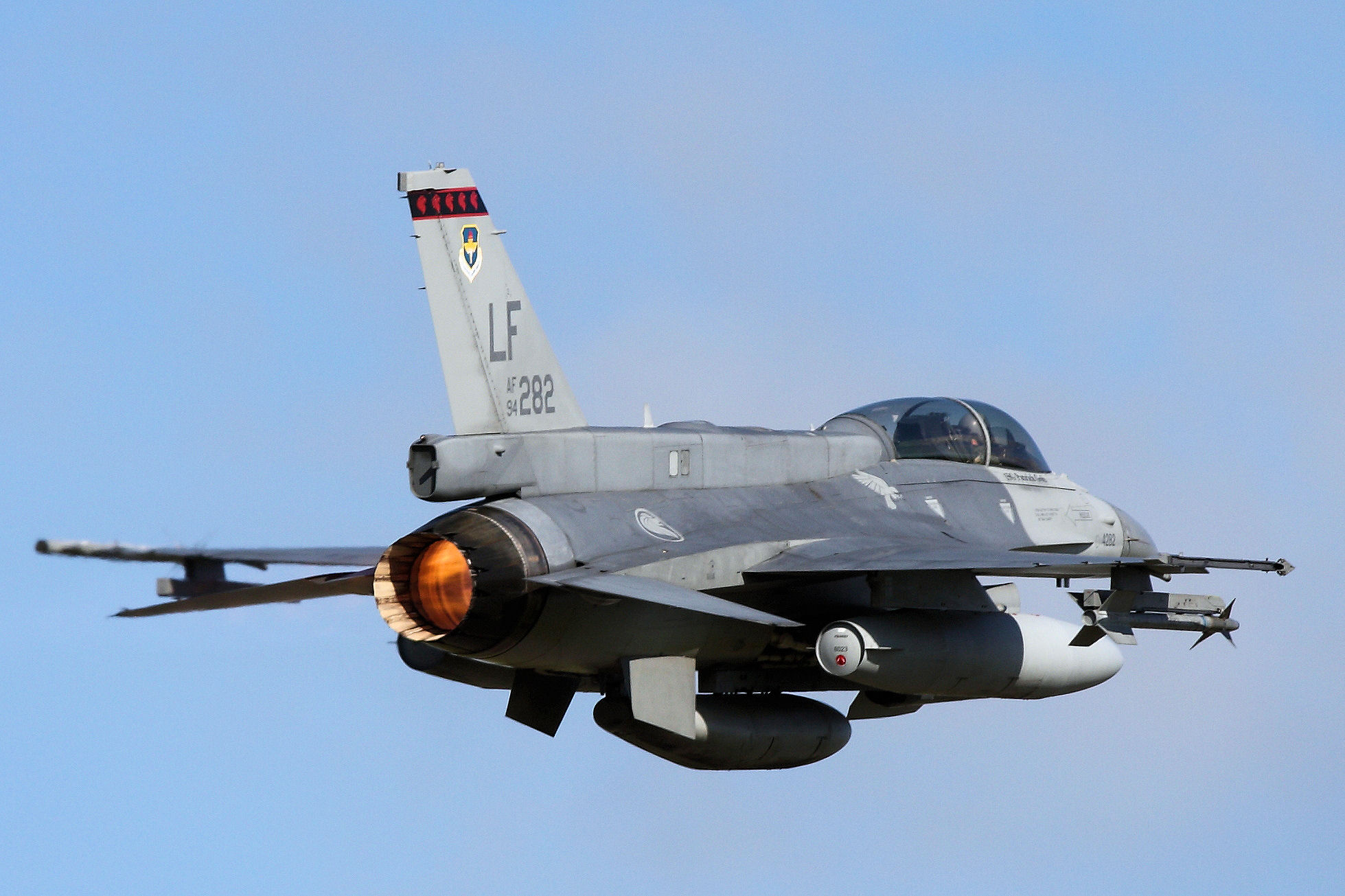
425th FS F-16 Fighting Falcon launches from Cold Lake, Canada during Exercise Maple Flag 42 in 2009

On 30 December 1992, the 425th was reactivated at Luke AFB under the designation 425th Fighter Squadron "Black Widows". The new mission of the 425th was providing advanced weapons and tactics continuation for Republic of Singapore Air Force's F-16 pilots and maintenance personnel. Aircraft had already arrived for the squadron in October and shortly after in the new year pilot training began in January 1993. Although the squadron has an American heritage, it was mix of both USAF and RSAF personnel and equipment. At first the squadron borrowed F-16A/B block 15s from the USAF in late 1992. This consisted of seven F-16As and two F-16Bs which were all borrowed. Most likely by coincidence, the Republic of Singapore Air Force ended up buying one of these F-16As years later that had been borrowed by them from the USAF. On 3 June 1998 the RSAF obtained F-16A #81-0677 as a GF-16A for ground maintenance/handling and weapons loading training. To complete the squadron, seven F-16A/Bs were sent from Singapore to join the squadron.

In 1995 the squadron leased twelve USAF F-16C/D block 42s as their nine USAF block 15s were withdrawn from service. The seven F-16A/Bs owned by the RSAF flew back to Singapore during this time period as well. In the end, the USAF could not honor the lease as they needed the block 42s back. A deal was struck with Lockheed Martin to lease a dozen new-built F-16C/D block 52's (4 F-16Cs and 8 F-16Ds) with options to buy them later. The aircraft were leased for a 2.5-year period, for an estimated cost of US$12.3 million. This program had no name assigned like the Peace Carvin FMS arrangement.

RSAF pilots and maintenance personnel are assigned to the 425th FS for two years. During their tour of duty they receive advanced tactics training, participate in Red Flag and Maple Flag exercises, shoot live missiles at Combat Archer and deploy to locations throughout the U.S. to participate in composite operations and dissimilar air combat exercises.

== Lineage ==
- Constituted as the 425th Night Fighter Squadron on 23 November 1943

Activated on 1 December 1943
Inactivated on 25 August 1947

- Redesignated: 425th Tactical Fighter Training Squadron on 22 August 1969

Activated on 15 October 1969
Inactivated on 1 September 1989

- Redesignated: 425th Fighter Squadron on 1 December 1992

Activated on 30 December 1992

=== Assignments ===
- 481st Night Fighter Operational Training Group, 1 December 1943
- IX Fighter Command, 23 May 1944
- IX Air Defense Command, 10 June 1944
- 71st Fighter Wing, 20 June 1944 (Note: Source says 471st Fighter Wing, which appears to be a typographical error, since no wing numbered higher than 325 was organized during World War II. See generally Maurer, Combat Units (listing wings).)
- IX Air Defense Command, 6 August 1944
- XIX Tactical Air Command, 7 October 1944
- Ninth Air Force, 7 July 1945
- Fourth Air Force, 9 September 1945
- Air Defense Command, 21 March 1946
- Fourth Air Force, 31 July 1946 – 25 August 1947
- 58th Tactical Fighter Training Wing (later 58th Tactical Training Wing), 15 October 1969
- 405th Tactical Training Wing, 29 August 1979 – 1 September 1989
- 58th Operations Group, 30 December 1992
- 56th Operations Group, 1 April 1994 – present

=== Stations ===
- Orlando Army Air Base, Florida, 1 December 1943
- Hammer Field, California, 30 January 1944
- Visalia Army Air Field, California, 25 February – 1 May 1944
- RAF Charmy Down (AAF-487), England, 26 May 1944
- RAF Scorton (AAF-425), England, 12 June 1944
- Stoneman Park, England, 12 August 1944
- Vannes Airfield (A-33), France, 18 August 1944
- Coulommiers Airfield (A-58), France, 11 September 1944
- Prosnes Airfield (A-79), France, 13 October 1944
- Verdun Airfield (A-82), France] 9 November 1944
- Frankfurt/Rhein-Main Airfield (Y-73), Germany, 12 April 1945
- Furth/Industriehafen Airfield (R-30), Germany, 2 May 1945
- Crépy-en-Laommis, France, 5 July 1945 (Ground Echelon)
- Saint-Victoret, France, 18–24 August 1945 (Ground Echelon)
- Lemoore Army Air Field, California, 9 September 1945
- Camp Pinedale, California, 23 October 1945
- March Field, California, 8 March 1946
- McChord Field, Washington, 1 September 1946 – 25 August 1947
- Williams Air Force Base, Arizona, 15 October 1969 – 1 September 1989
- Luke Air Force Base, Arizona, 30 December 1992 – present

=== Aircraft ===
- Northrop YP-61 Black Widow (1944)
- de Havilland Mosquito (1944)
- Northrop P-61 Black Widow (1944–1947)
- Douglas A-20 Havoc (1944)
- Douglas P-70 Havoc (1944)
- Northrop F-5 Freedom Fighter (1969–1989)
- General Dynamics F-16 Fighting Falcon (1993–present)

== See also ==
- 428th Fighter Squadron Peace Carvin V
