= 789th Anti-Aircraft Artillery Battalion =

789th Anti-Aircraft Artillery (Automatic Weapons) Battalion
- Active: 1943–1945
- Country: USA
- Branch: Army
- Type: Anti Aircraft Artillery
- Motto: Set with Nerve
- Battle honours: Ardennes; Central Europe; Northern France; Rhineland

789th Anti-Aircraft Artillery (Automatic Weapons) Battalion was an anti-aircraft artillery battalion of the United States Army during World War II.

The 789th AAA-AW BN was created on April 30, 1943 at Camp Stewart. The battalion moved through several locations in the United States until leaving for England on May 13, 1944 and arriving in England on May 25, 1944. The 789th was directly involved in four campaigns: Northern France, Antwerp, Ardennes, and the Rhineland.

== Organization ==
The 789th AAA Battalion was composed of four batteries (A, B, C, and D) which consisted of roughly 200-250 individuals. Each battery contained ten 40mm Bofors anti-aircraft artillery guns. The 789th AAA Battalion also contained a headquarters, or HQ, battery which managed the administrative responsibilities of the battalion.

== Training ==
After completing basic training, members of the 789th AAA Battalion were sent to Fort Stewart in Liberty County, Georgia for their training as an artillery unit. The majority of this training focused on developing battalion members' skills and understandings of operations as an anti-aircraft artillery battalion.

Following the 789th AAA Battalion's training at Fort Stewart, the battalion moved to Fort Pickett in Blackstone, Virginia. This training at Fort Pickett differed significantly from the training at Fort Stewart and instead focused on developing proficiency and understanding of basic infantry tactics and operations. While the 789th AAA Battalion was not intended to act as an infantry unit, anti-aircraft artillery units could be attached to a variety of other units, including infantry units.

== Deployment to England ==
The 789th AAA Battalion departed for England on May 13, 1944 and arrived on May 23, 1944. While in England, the 789th AAA Battalion was honored with the assignment of providing the air-aircraft protection for the Supreme Headquarters Allied Expeditionary Force in Bushy Park, London. In addition to protecting the SHAEF in Bushy Park, the 789th AAA Battalion also spent time in Poole Harbour, where they were one of several AAA battalions responsible for protecting the invasion force from German V-1 flying bombs.

== Northern France ==
The 789th AAA Battalion remained in England for several months before departing for Northern France in the late-summer of 1944. After moving to mainland Europe, the 789th AAA Battalion provided protection for allied forces which were stationed in Northern France. During this time, members of the 789th AAA Battalion earned their first campaign star and were awarded credit for the Northern France Campaign.

== Antwerp X ==
After the Allies had secured France and were advancing Westward, the need to efficiently re-supply the forces was becoming more dire. The Port of Antwerp was in a perfect position to allow the Allies to quickly get supplies to the front lines. Knowing the importance that the port played, the Germans began a fierce bombing campaign of the entire city of Antwerp in an attempt to destroy the port. The Allies rushed the 50th AAA Group, which included the 789th AAA Battalion, to Antwerp in an effort to protect the city from the German buzz bombs.

Beginning in October 1944, Brigadier General Clare Hibbs Armstrong commanded the Antwerp X campaign which sought to protect Antwerp and its residents. The 789th AAA Battalion was one of the first units to set up its guns on Antwerp's outskirts in the city of Lier, Belgium. The 789th AAA Battalion held this position from late-October through mid-December. During this time, the 789th shot down more than 250 buzz bombs and its members earned their second campaign star for the Antwerp Campaign, or unofficially Antwerp X.

The launch of the German surprise attack in the Ardennes, or the Battle of the Bulge, temporarily drew the 789th AAA Battalion away from Antwerp.
