= Finist'air =

French airline

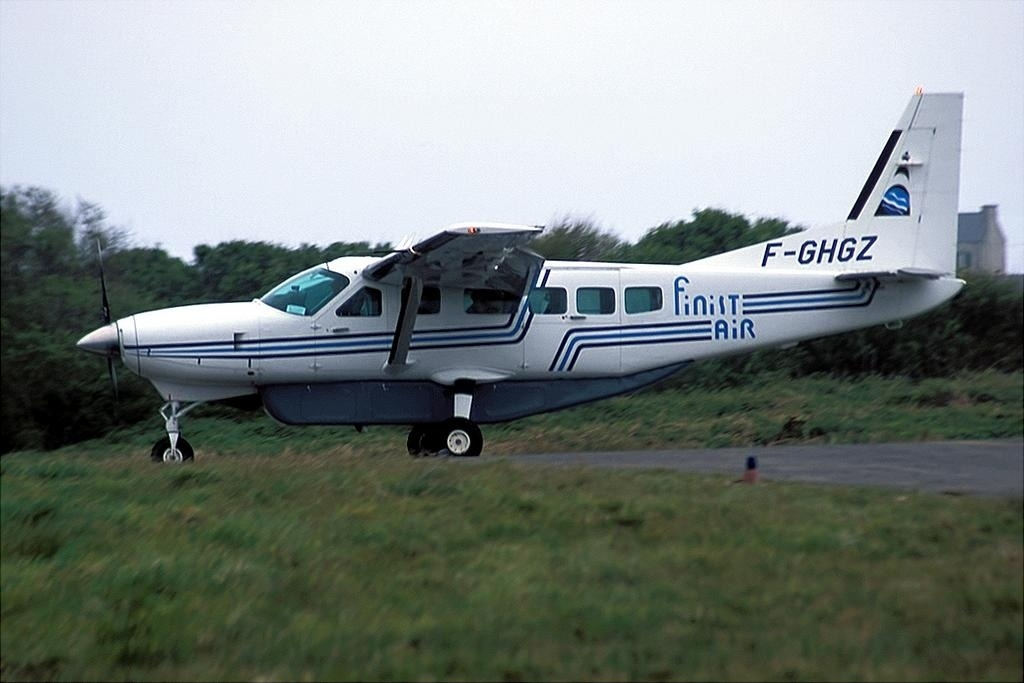
- Cessna 208 Caravan
IATA	ICAO	Call sign
-	FTR	FINISTAIR
- Founded: 1981
- Fleet size: 1
- Destinations: 2
- Headquarters: Brest, Brittany, France
- Key people: Loïc Andro (CEO)
- Website: finistair.fr

Finist'air is a French regional airline based at Brest Bretagne Airport. It provides passenger service, air taxi, and freight transport and currently transports 3,000 passengers annually.

== History ==
Finist'air was founded in 1981 by the government of the Finistère departément to transport passengers between Ouessant (in the Ponant Islands) and Brest. It was taken over by W3 in March 2020.

== Destinations ==
Two daily flights are operated on the Brest-Ouessant route.

Seasonal flights from Brest to Jersey, and from Jersey to Alderney are operated in the summer.

== Fleet ==
In the past years the airline has always operated Cessna aircraft such as Cessna 207, Cessna 208, Cessna 210. The airline now flies a Cessna 208 Caravan.
