= IX Air Defense Command =

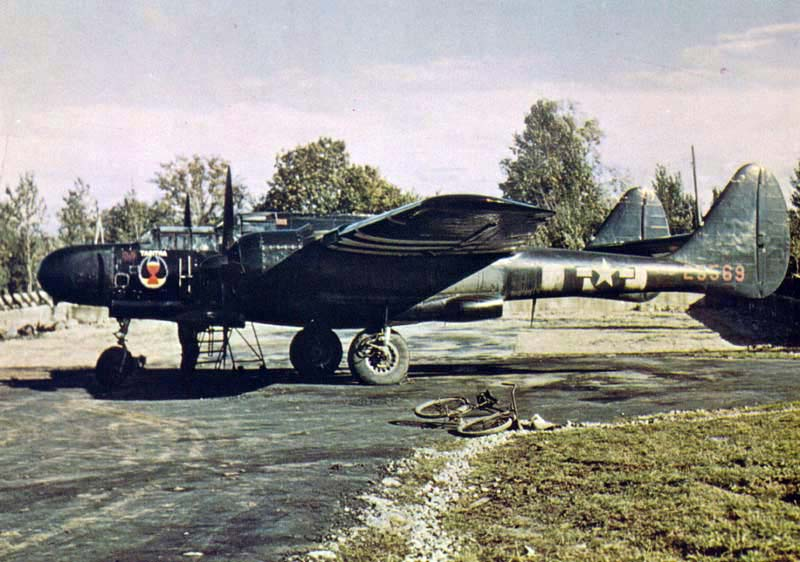
- P-61 Black Widow of the 425th Night Fighter Squadron (Note: Aircraft is Northrop P-61A-10-NO, serial 42-5569 "Tabitha.")
- Active: 1944–1946
- Country: United States
- Branch: United States Air Force
- Role: Air defense
- Engagements: European Theater of Operations

The IX Air Defense Command was a United States Army Air Forces formation. It was assigned throughout its time in combat to Ninth Air Force. Its final station was at Bad Neustadt an der Saale, Germany, where it was inactivated on 25 June 1946.

== History ==
It was established in England on 19 July 1944, and activated on 1 July 1944. Mission was to provide air defense for liberated areas of Western Europe consisting of France and later, the Low Countries. Subordinate wing headquarters and subordinate units operated primarily from liberated airfields and newly built temporary Advanced Landing Grounds in continental Europe. Along with air defense, subordinate units engaged in combat in support of ground forces during the breakthrough at St. Lo in July 1944. Attacked tanks, trucks, and troop concentrations as enemy retreated; provided armed reconnaissance for advancing Allied armored columns. During September 1944, attacked flak positions near Eindhoven during Operation Market-Garden, the airborne landing in the Netherlands; bombed enemy communications and transportation lines in western Germany. Flew armed reconnaissance missions over Battle of the Bulge during December 1944 – January 1944. Flew missions against enemy transportation systems including motor vehicles, bridges, trains, railway bridges, and marshalling yards during February and March 1945. Moved to Germany in April 1945, flying last combat missions on 3 May 1945.

However, inactivation only occurred on 25 June 1946, and the unit was disbanded on 8 October 1948.

== Lineage ==
- Constituted as the IX Air Defense Command on 19 June 1944

Activated on 1 July 1944
Inactivated on 25 July 1946
Disbanded on 8 October 1948

=== Assignments ===
- Ninth Air Force, 1 July 1944
- Unknown, 28 November 1945
- United States Air Forces in Europe, 2 December 1945
- Unknown, 1 February 1946 – 25 June 1946

=== Stations ===
- Borough of Hampstead, London (AAF-405), England, 1 July 1944
- Ecrammeville, France, July 1944
- Rennes Airfield (A-27), France, 25 August 1944
- Versailles, France, 8 September 1944
- Paris, France, 16 December 1944
- Bad Neustadt an der Saale, Germany, 24 May 1945 – 25 June 1946

=== Components ===
Wing

- 71st Fighter Wing, 1 July 1944 – November 1945

Squadrons and companies

- 422d Night Fighter Squadron, 6 August – 7 October 1944
- 425th Night Fighter Squadron, 10–20 June 1944; 6 August – 7 October 1944
- 368th Ordnance Maintenance (AA) Company, 1945
