= Blinder =

Blinder or Blinders may refer to:

- Blinder (surname)
- Blinders, also known as blinkers, a part of some types of equine bridle that blocks a horse's vision to the side and rear
- Blinders (poultry), a similar device that blocks forward vision for chickens
- Blinder (film), a 2013 Australian film
- Blinders (Friday Night Lights), an episode of the TV series Friday Night Lights
- Blinder, the original name of the English alternative rock band Headswim
- The Blinders, an English rock band from Doncaster, based in Manchester
- The NATO reporting name for the Tupolev Tu-22 bomber

== See also ==
- Window blind
- Beyer Blinder Belle, architectural firm
