= Geneva Airport =

International airport serving Geneva, Switzerland

Geneva Airport Aéroport de Genève

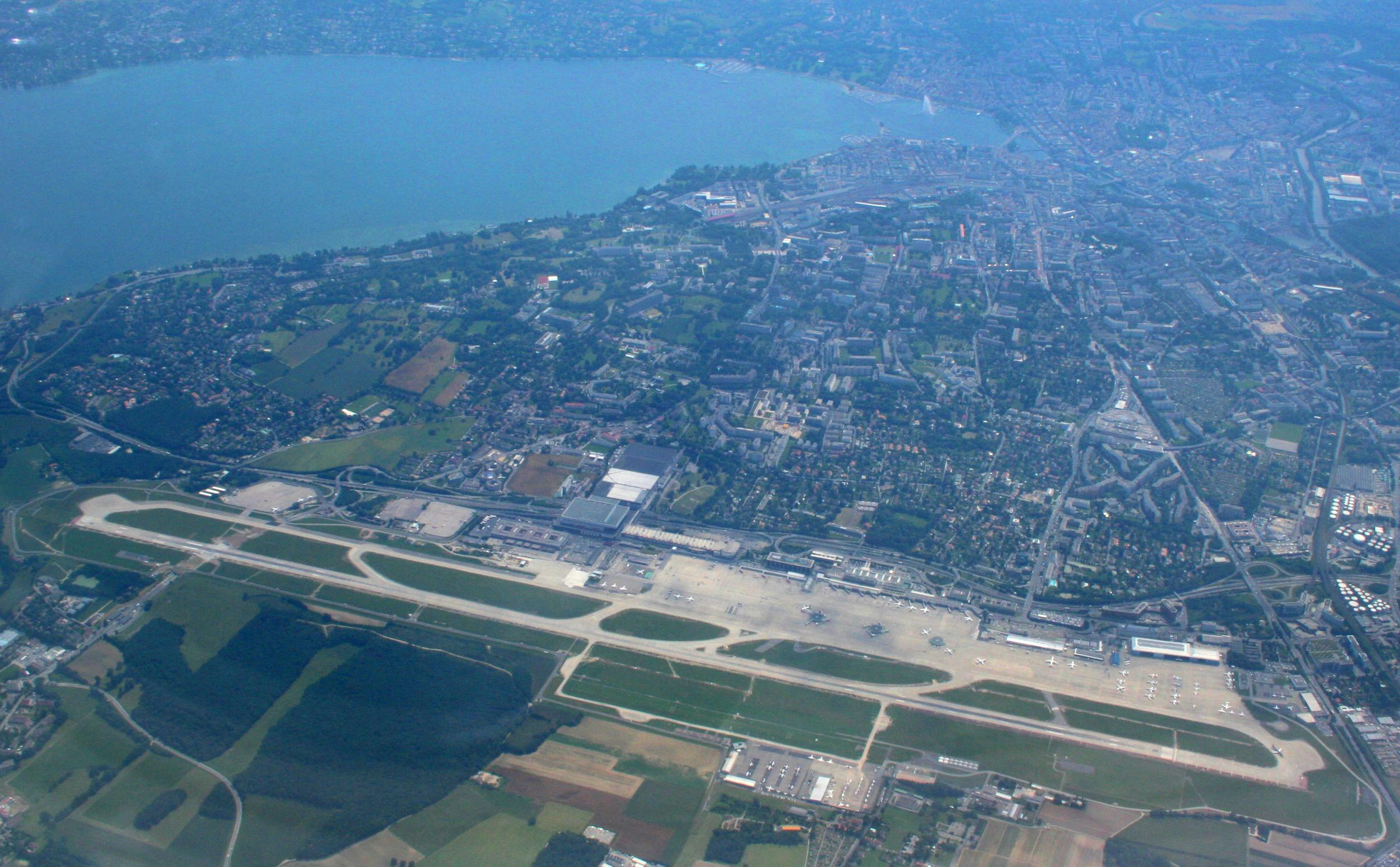
- IATA: GVA; ICAO: LSGG

Summary
- Airport type: Public
- Owner: Canton of Geneva
- Operator: Genève Aéroport
- Serves: Grand Genève
- Location: Le Grand-Saconnex, Meyrin and Bellevue
- Opened: 11 October 1919; 107 years ago
- Hub for: Swiss International Air Lines
- Operating base for: easyJet Switzerland
- Elevation AMSL: 1,411 ft (430 m)
- Coordinates: 46°14′15″N 6°06′33″E
- Website: www.gva.ch/en

Map
- Location of airport

Runways
Direction	Length		Surface
Direction	m	ft	Surface
04/22	3,900	12,795	Concrete

Statistics (2024)
- Passengers: 17,796,333
- Cargo (in metric tons): 92,621
- Movements: 179,106
- Source: Geneva Airport Media Center 17 January 2017

Geneva Airport (IATA: GVA, ICAO: LSGG) – formerly and still unofficially known as Cointrin Airport – is the international airport for Geneva, the second most populous city in Switzerland. It is located 4 km (2.5 mi) northwest of the city centre. It surpassed the 15-million-passengers-a-year mark for the first time in December 2014. The airport serves as a hub for Swiss International Air Lines and easyJet Switzerland. It features a network of flights mainly to continental European destinations as well as some long-haul routes to North America, China, Africa, and the Middle East, amongst them Swiss International Air Lines' only long-haul service outside Zürich, to New York–JFK.

The airport lies entirely within Swiss territory, however, its northern limit runs along the Swiss–French border and the airport can be accessed from both countries. The freight operations are also accessible from both countries, making Geneva a European Union freight hub although Switzerland is not a member of the EU. The airport is partially in the municipality of Meyrin and partially in the municipality of Le Grand-Saconnex.

== History ==
Aerial view in 1968

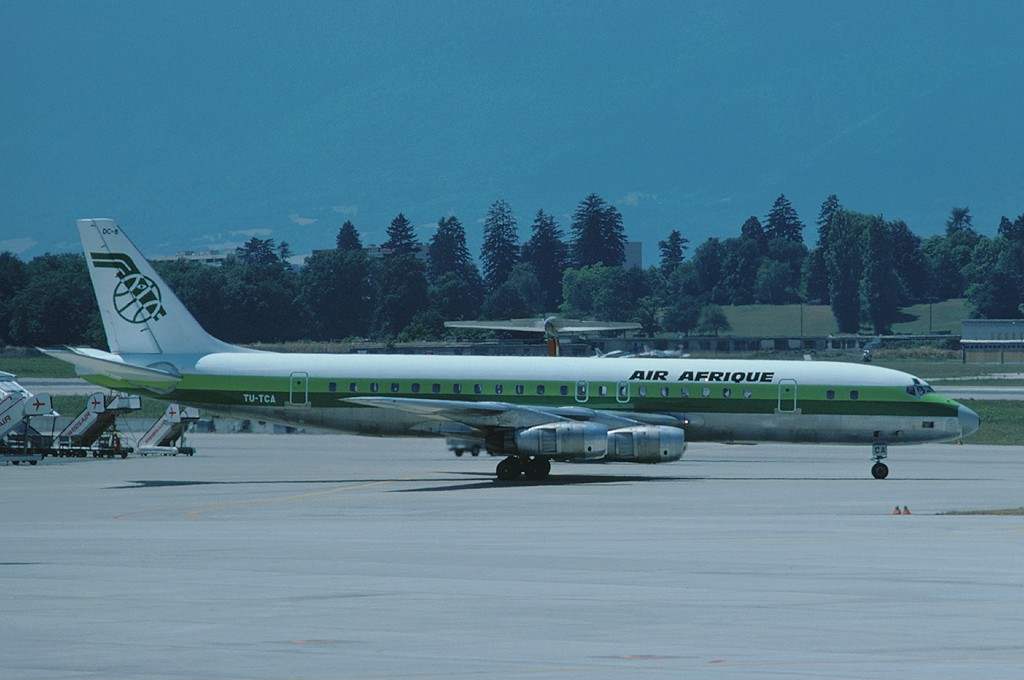
An Air Afrique Douglas DC-8 in Geneva in 1976.

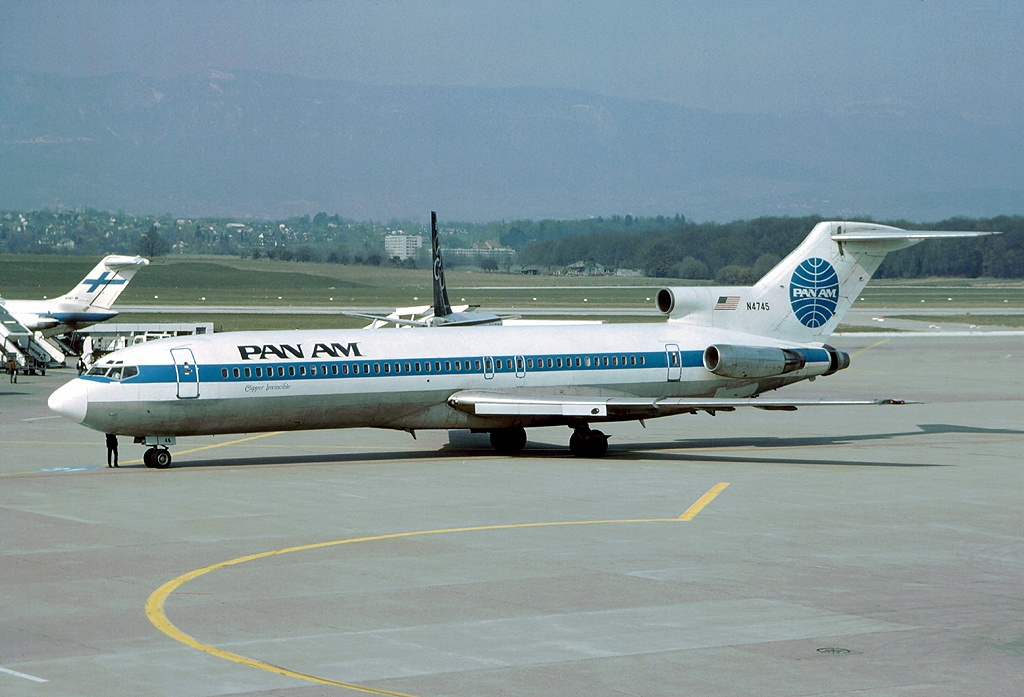
A Pan Am Boeing 727-200 in Geneva in 1987 with aircraft from Finnair and Olympic Airways also visible.

=== Early years ===
On 11 October 1919, the Grand Council of Geneva approved the establishment of an "airfield" at Meyrin. A simple airfield was established in Cointrin, near the city of Geneva, covering an area of 54 hectares (130 acres). From 1926 to 1931, the airfield's wooden sheds were replaced by three concrete hangars. At the time, there was a small amount of air traffic, with Luft Hansa flying from Berlin to Barcelona via Halle, Leipzig, Geneva and Marseille. Swissair also flew the Geneva–Lyon–Paris route through a codesharing agreement with Air Union. By 1930, there were six airlines that flew to Geneva Airport on seven different routes.

1937 saw construction of the first concrete runway; it measured 405 by 21 metres (1,329 by 69 ft). In 1938, eight airlines were flying to Geneva: Swissair, KLM, Deutsche Luft Hansa, Air France, Malert (Hungary), AB Aerotransport (Sweden), Alpar (Switzerland) and Imperial Airways (UK).

During World War II, the Swiss authorities forbade all flights from Switzerland, but expansion of the airport led to increasing its area to 95 hectares (230 acres) and extending the main runway first to 1,000 by 50 metres (3,280 by 160 ft). A further 200 metres (660 ft) of runway was added near the end of the war as well as provision for future expansion to a length of 2,500 metres (8,200 ft).

As part of the Federal Government's post-war planning for the nation's airports, Geneva was identified as one of four main urban airports that were to form the first tier of that system. Cointrin was noted as being well suited for extension and did not require a triangular runway arrangement as the prevailing winds are very regularly along a single axis. Authorities agreed to a 2.3 million Swiss Francs project to build the first terminal in Geneva, and in 1946 the new terminal – which is today used as Terminal 2 – was ready for use, and the runway was enlarged once more to 2,000 m (6,600 ft). In 1947, the first service to New York started with a Swissair Douglas DC-4. On 17 July 1959, the first jet aircraft landed in Geneva, an SAS Caravelle, and it was followed, 11 years later, by a TWA Boeing 747 which landed in 1970.

== Facilities ==
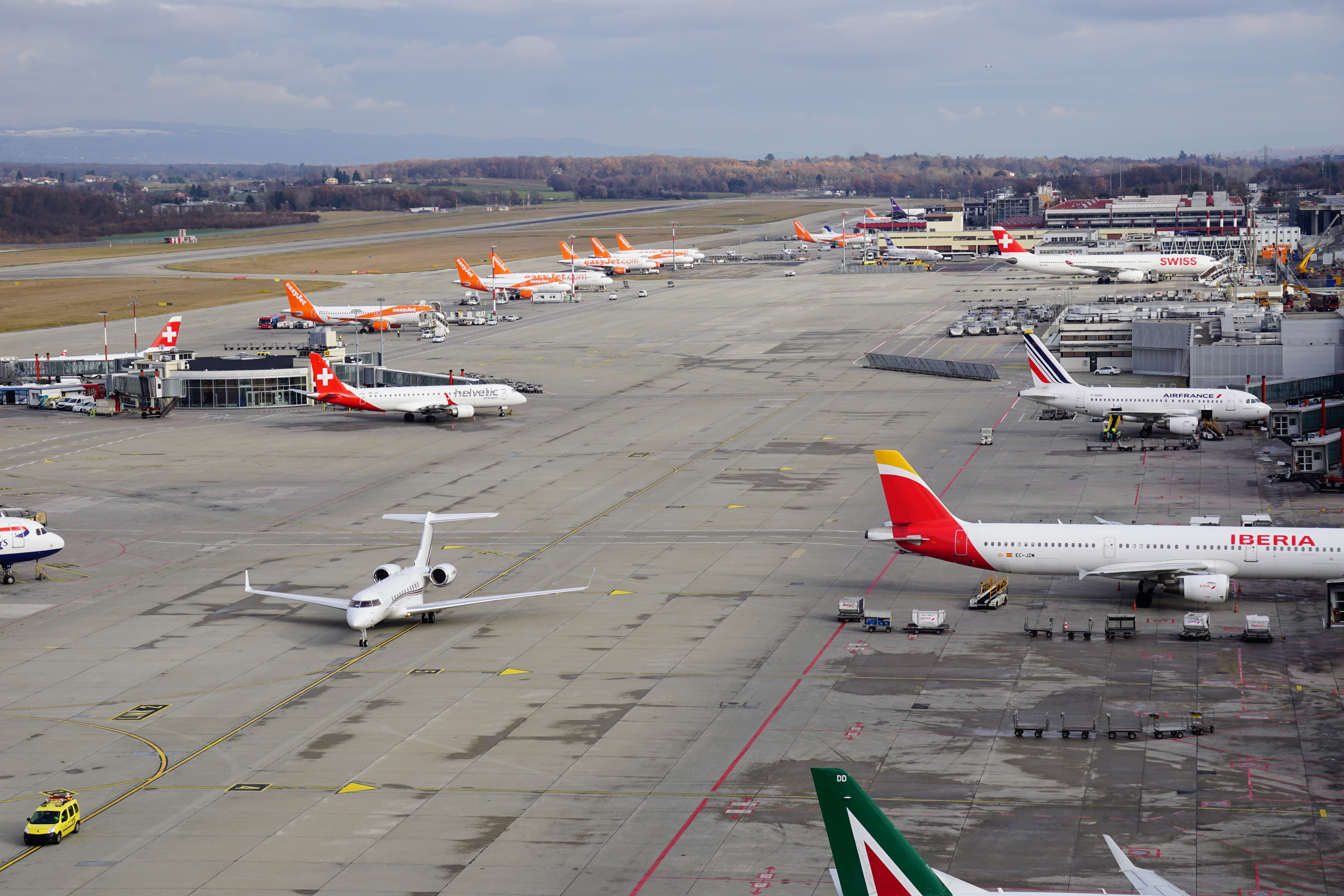
Apron view

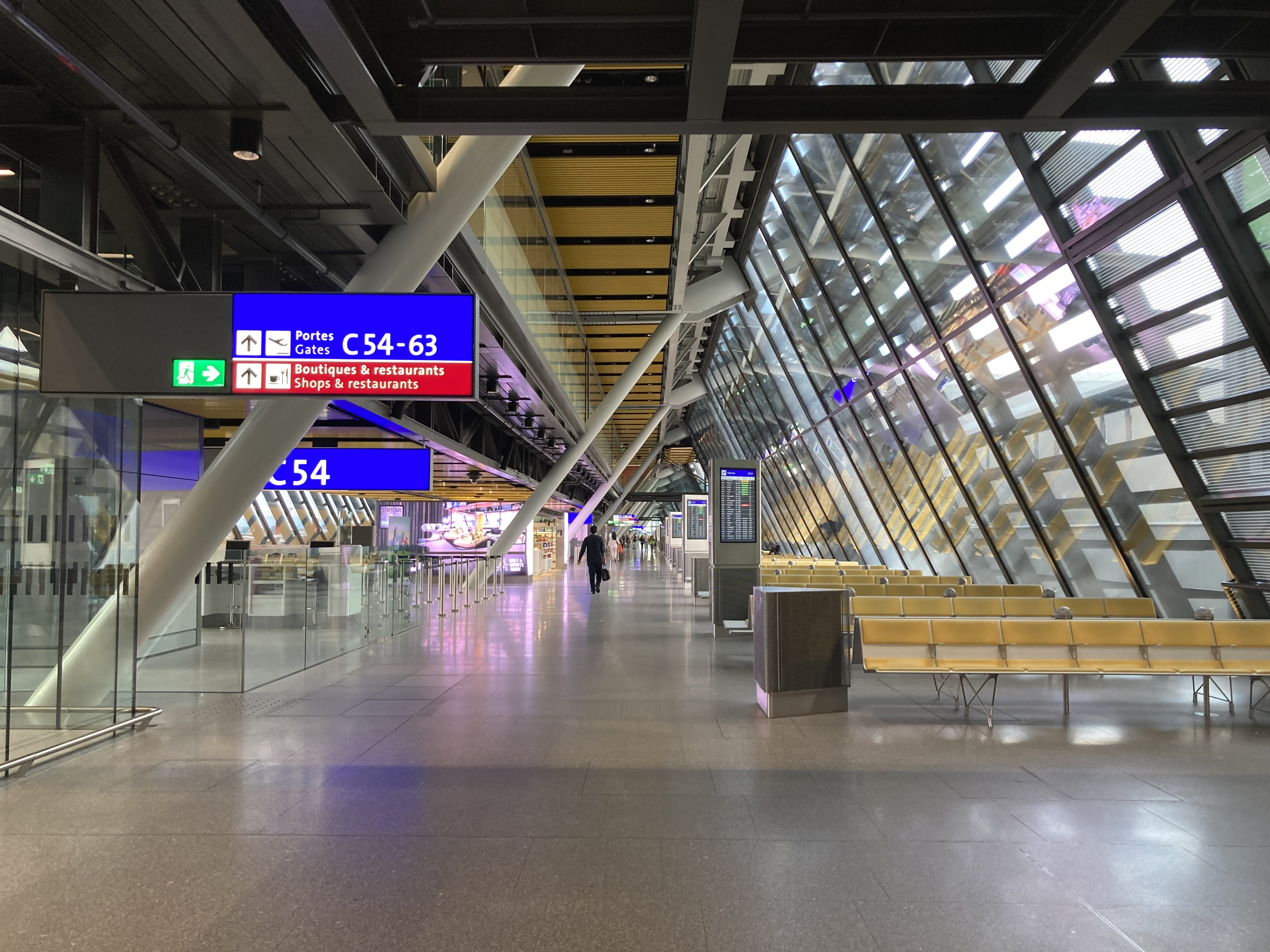
Terminal interior

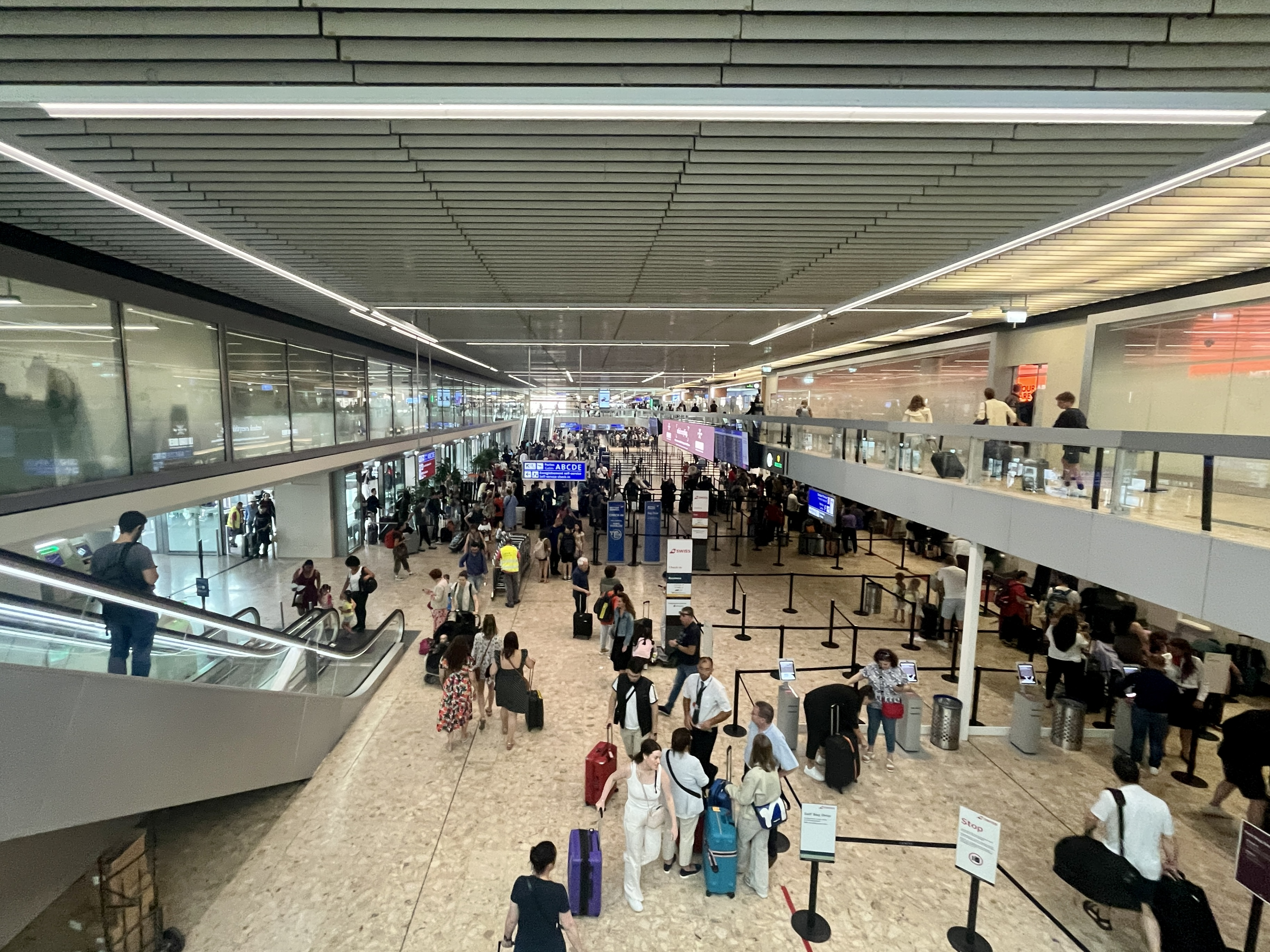
Terminal interior

=== Terminals ===
Geneva Airport has two passenger terminals: the newer and larger Terminal 1 (T1), which features the majority of flights, and the smaller and only seasonally used Terminal 2 (T2). It also has a Business Aviation Terminal, also known as Terminal 3 (T3).

==== Terminal 1 ====
Terminal 1, also known as Main terminal (M) is divided into 5 piers, A, B, C, D and F. Piers A, B, C and D are located in the Swiss side of Terminal 1. Passengers travelling from these gates (to Swiss or international destinations) check in at the main check-in hall and use the central security check above the check in hall. Pier A is located directly in front of the main shopping area and serves destinations in the Schengen area and domestic flight to Zürich. There are 10 gates (A1-A10) with 8 jetbridges at A1-A5 and A8-A10 and 2 bus gates at A6 and A7 . Pier B consists of two non-Schengen circular satellite buildings which are reached from the shopping area via an underground walkway, which also houses passport control. These are gates B31-B34 and B41-B44. All gates have jetbridges except B41. Pier C, also non-Schengen, is to the right of Pier A and houses long haul flights using wide body aircraft. There are 13 gates numbered C51-C63, all jetbridges except C58, C59 and C62. Pier D consists of one circular satellite with no jetbridges and one bus gate building, which is split between Schengen and non-Schengen passengers on different floors. These are reached via underground walkways from the left end of Pier A.

Before Switzerland's integration into the Schengen Area in 2008, Pier F, also known as the French Sector, was used exclusively for passengers arriving from, or departing to destinations in France. It has two gates with jet bridges (F12 and F13) and four bus gates (F14-F17). The French Sector exists as a stipulation of an agreement between France and the Canton of Geneva dating from the 1960s, and enables travel between the neighboring French region of Pays de Gex and the airport while avoiding Swiss territory and customs. The French Sector area still exists for passengers arriving from French destinations who wish to exit directly to French territory and avoid Swiss customs controls, although passport control and immigration checks have been dropped as part of the Schengen Treaty. Buses to French ski resorts south of Geneva nowadays use the Swiss sector, since the road distance is much shorter through Geneva, and the passport control is dropped also at the border south of Geneva.

In June 2016, Geneva Airport management announced that they will start upgrading the main check-in hall in terminal 1. This will add one thousand square metres to the actual check-in area and help to cope with the higher passenger volume that the airport faces every year. The renovated check-in hall was fully opened by the end of 2017.

===== Long-haul pier Aile Est =====
The airport announced in 2012 a plan to replace the current, outdated long-haul section (Pier C) of the terminal, which originally was intended to be an interim solution back in 1975, with a completely reconstructed facility. Construction originally was delayed by several years by Swissair moving its long haul operation to Zurich in 1996. The September 11, 2001, attacks and the bankruptcy of Swissair in 2001 delayed it further. Lately, a few airlines such as Emirates, Etihad Airways, Qatar Airways, United Airlines, and Swiss International Air Lines have started to use the current facility. The need for this new pier was then urgent. The extension of the airport was opposed by some associations (such as NOÉ21).

In December 2021, construction of the new Aile Est (East Wing) was completed. It is a completely new extension of the terminal replacing the old Pier C in the same location. The new facility is 520 m (1,710 ft) long and is able to handle six widebody long-haul aircraft at once directly at the building. This building is ecofriendly, electricity produced by 5,000 m^{2} (54,000 sq ft) of solar panels, more than 100 geothermal probes for heat pumps, glazed facades for natural light, additional LED lighting, recovery of rainwater, optimum thermal insulation with triple glazing, eliminates bus rides on the tarmac, and finally power supply and hot / cold direct 3 additional positions instead of an external diesel power. The new terminal pier has been in operation since 14 December 2021 and is used for all long-haul flights and several non-Schengen destinations.

==== Terminal 2 ====
Terminal 2 is only used during the winter charter season. This was the original terminal at Geneva Airport. It was built in 1946 and remained in use until the 1960s when the Main Terminal opened. Facilities at Terminal 2 are poor, with only one restaurant and no duty-free shops. Passengers check in and pass through security checks at this terminal, and then take a low floor bus to piers A, B, C and D at T1. Arriving passengers are bussed directly from the aircraft to T2 and then pass through passport control (if needed) and collect their baggage there. Geneva Airport wanted to refurbish T2 as a low-cost terminal. At this time EasyJet was the major low-cost airline in Geneva with up to 80 flights a day during winter. Other major airlines at GVA threatened to leave the airport if EasyJet had its own terminal with lower landing charges. Since then, there has been no information about an upgrade of T2 facilities.

==== Business Aviation Terminal ====
The Business Aviation Terminal, or Terminal 3 (T3), is located at the south-west end of the airport, about 2 km (1.2 mi) from Terminal 1. This terminal is a hub for private charter jet companies (also known as Fixed-Base Operators, or FBOs) that offer facilities including VIP lounges, private immigration, and customs screening. Parking at Terminal 3 is limited.

=== Runways ===
The airport has a single concrete runway (04/22), which is the longest in Switzerland (and one of the longest in Europe) with a length of 3,900 m (12,795 ft), making it open to use by aircraft of all existing sizes. Adjacent to the commercial runway used to be a smaller, parallel, grass runway (04L/22R) for light aircraft that is not used anymore. Since its opening, the runway had been known as 05/23 until September 13, 2018, when it was changed to 04/22 due to the North Magnetic Pole moving. Usually, runway 22 is used when the wind is calm. If the wind is stronger than 4 knots (7.4 km/h; 4.6 mph) and in a direction going from 320 to 140 degrees, then runway 04 will be used.

=== Other facilities ===
- Now defunct Swiss regional airline Baboo had its head office on the grounds of the airport and in Grand-Saconnex.
- Geneva International Airport hosts an office of the International Air Transport Association (IATA).

== Airlines and destinations ==
The following airlines offer regular scheduled and charter flights at Geneva Airport:

Airlines	Destinations
Aegean Airlines	Athens
Aer Lingus	Dublin; Seasonal: Cork
Air Algérie	Algiers
Air Arabia	Casablanca
airBaltic	Seasonal: Riga, Tallinn, Vilnius (begins 2 January 2027)
Air Canada	Montréal–Trudeau
Air China	Beijing–Capital
Air Dolomiti	Munich
Air Europa	Madrid
Air France	Paris–Charles de Gaulle
Air Mauritius	Seasonal: Mauritius
Air Mountain	Seasonal: Saint-Tropez
Air Serbia	Belgrade
Air Transat	Seasonal: Montréal–Trudeau (begins 20 June 2027)
AJet	Istanbul–Sabiha Gökçen; Seasonal: Ankara
Animawings	Bucharest–Otopeni
Arkia	Tel Aviv
Austrian Airlines	Vienna
British Airways	London–Heathrow; Seasonal: London–City, London–Gatwick, London–Stansted
Brussels Airlines	Brussels
China Eastern Airlines	Shanghai–Pudong
easyJet	Agadir, Alicante, Amsterdam, Athens, Barcelona, Belgrade, Berlin, Birmingham, Bordeaux, Brindisi, Bristol, Brussels, Budapest, Catania, Copenhagen, Djerba, Edinburgh, Enfidha, Fuerteventura, Funchal, Hamburg, Kraków, Lille, Lisbon, London–Gatwick, London–Southend, Madrid, Málaga, Manchester, Marrakesh, Nantes, Naples, Nice, Palermo, Palma de Mallorca, Paris–Orly, Porto, Prague, Pristina, Rabat, Rennes, Rome–Fiumicino, Santiago de Compostela, Sarajevo (begins 22 April 2027), Seville, Skopje, Tangier, Tel Aviv, Tenerife–South, Tirana, Toulouse, Venice; Seasonal: Aberdeen, A Coruña, Ajaccio, Bari, Bastia, Belfast–International, Bilbao, Bournemouth, Cagliari, Calvi, Chania, Corfu, Dubrovnik, Faro, Figari, Giza, Glasgow, Gran Canaria, Heraklion, Hurghada, Ibiza, Isle of Man (begins 19 December 2026), Lamezia Terme, Lanzarote, Larnaca, La Rochelle, Leeds/Bradford, Liverpool, London–Stansted, Malta, Marsa Alam, Menorca, Mykonos, Newcastle upon Tyne, Newquay (begins 16 January 2027), Olbia, Oslo, Rhodes,, Santorini, Sharm El Sheikh, Southampton, Split, Tbilisi, Tivat, Valencia
Egyptair	Cairo
El Al	Tel Aviv
Emirates	Dubai–International
Ethiopian Airlines	Addis Ababa, Manchester, Lyon
Etihad Airways	Abu Dhabi
Eurowings	Düsseldorf, Prague
Finnair	Helsinki
Flynas	Seasonal: Riyadh
FlyOne	Chișinău
Gulf Air	Seasonal: Bahrain, Milan–Malpensa
Iberia	Madrid
Icelandair	Seasonal: Reykjavík–Keflavík
ITA Airways	Rome–Fiumicino
Jet2.com	Seasonal: Birmingham, Bristol, East Midlands, Edinburgh, Glasgow, Leeds/Bradford, London–Gatwick (begins 19 December 2026), London–Luton, London–Stansted, Manchester, Newcastle upon Tyne
KLM	Amsterdam
Kuwait Airways	Kuwait City
LATAM Brasil	São Paulo–Guarulhos (begins 2 April 2027)
Luxair	Luxembourg
Middle East Airlines	Beirut
Norwegian Air Shuttle	Oslo; Seasonal: Copenhagen, Tromsø
Nouvelair	Tunis
Pegasus Airlines	Antalya, Istanbul–Sabiha Gökçen
Qatar Airways	Doha
Royal Air Maroc	Casablanca
Royal Jordanian	Amman–Queen Alia
Saudia	Jeddah, Riyadh
Scandinavian Airlines	Copenhagen, Oslo, Stockholm–Arlanda
SunExpress	Seasonal: Antalya, Kayseri
Swiss International Air Lines	Athens, Berlin, Brussels, Copenhagen, Dublin, Frankfurt, Lisbon, London–Heathrow, Málaga, Marrakesh, Munich, New York–JFK, Nice, Porto, Pristina, Stockholm–Arlanda, Valencia, Zürich; Seasonal: Alicante, Antalya, Biarritz, Brindisi, Catania, Corfu, Cork, Faro, Funchal, Gothenburg, Hamburg, Heraklion, Hurghada, Ibiza, Kalamata, Kos, Larnaca, London–Gatwick, Menorca, Mykonos, Olbia, Oslo, Palma de Mallorca, Rhodes, Santorini, Thessaloniki, Vienna, Zakynthos
TAP Air Portugal	Lisbon, Porto
Transavia	Seasonal: Rotterdam/The Hague
TUI Airways	Seasonal: Bristol, London–Gatwick, Manchester, Newcastle Upon Tyne
Tunisair	Djerba, Tunis
Turkish Airlines	Istanbul
United Airlines	Newark, Washington–Dulles
Vueling	Barcelona

== Statistics ==
Busiest routes at Geneva Airport (2025)
Rank	City	Total departing and arriving passengers
1	London (Heathrow, Gatwick, Luton, Stansted, Southend, City)	2,154,175
2	Porto	820,299
3	Lisbon	698,648
4	Paris (CDG, Orly)	686,792
5	Amsterdam	585,262
6	Madrid	553,275
7	Istanbul	530,315
8	Barcelona	520,403
9	Brussels	506,873
10	Zürich	487,072
11	Nice	435,349
12	Manchester	379,116
13	Pristina	322,606
14	Athens	322,168
15	Dubai	317,863
16	Frankfurt	315,074
17	Copenhagen	305,094
18	Rome	291,668
19	New York	278,918
20	Munich	249,675

== Ground transport ==
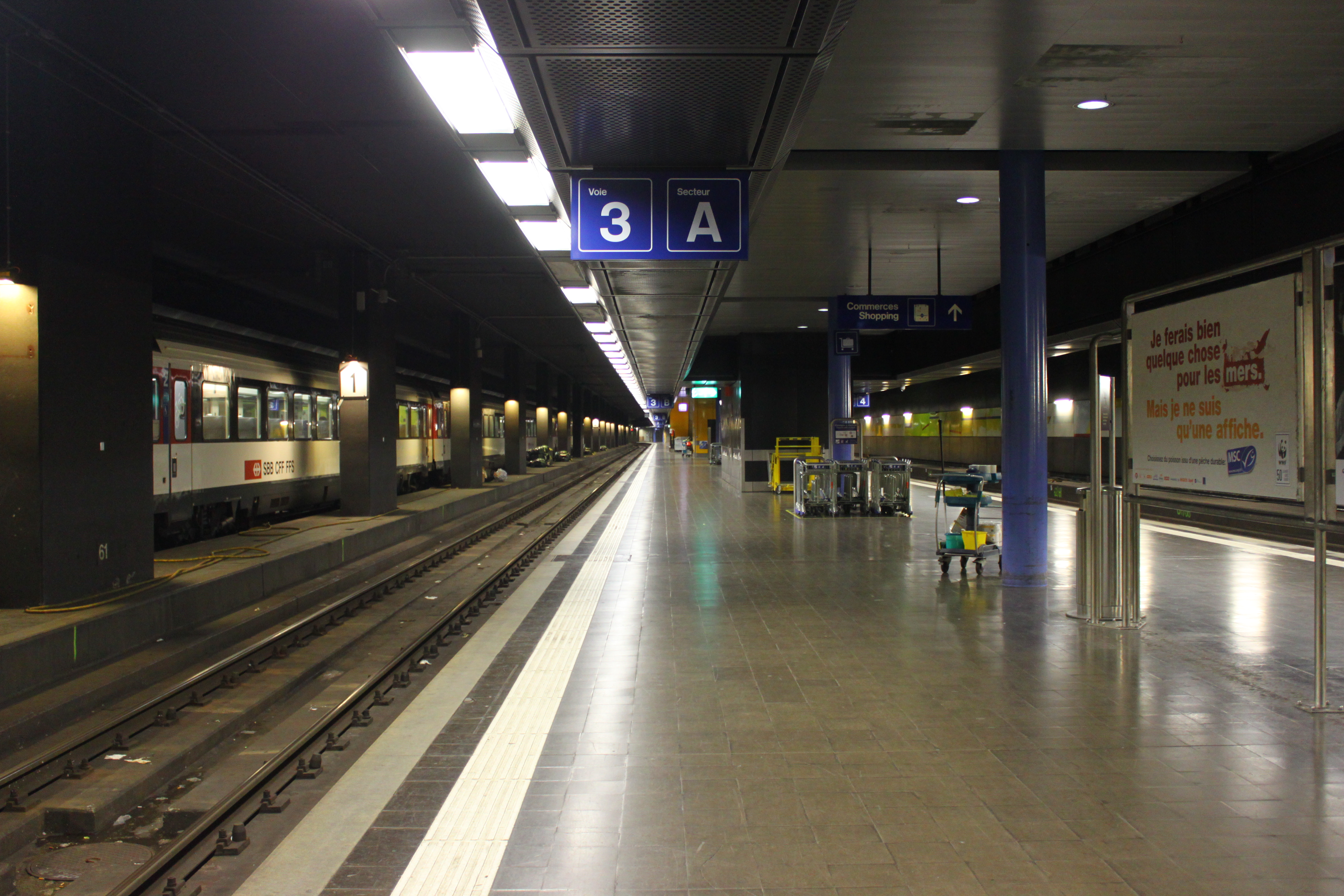
Geneva Airport railway station prior to its refurbishment

=== Train ===
The airport is 4 km (2.5 mi) from the Geneva city centre. There is a railway station with trains to Geneva-Cornavin station, and other cities in Switzerland.

=== Bus ===
There are local buses that stop at the airport. There are also buses to and from Annecy, France, and also seasonal buses to ski resort Chamonix in France and ski resorts in Switzerland. Many transfer companies operate shared transfers in the winter to many French ski resorts. Winter weekends see dozens of coaches at the nearby Charter terminal (former cargo terminal) meeting charter flights from all over Europe, but primarily the UK. These take holidaymakers to/from ski resorts in France, Switzerland and Italy. The buses in general go from the Swiss sector since this shortens the driving distance to most destinations.

== Incidents and accidents ==
- In 1950, Air India Flight 245, a Lockheed Constellation, crashed into Mont Blanc while descending toward Geneva.
- In 1966, a very similar accident occurred when Air India Flight 101, a Boeing 707, crashed into Mont Blanc while descending toward Geneva.
- On 17 October 1982, an Egypt Air Boeing 707-366C, SU-APE struck the ground short of runway 23, bounced then slid off the left side of the runway, turned 270 degrees and continued sliding backwards. The right wing separated and a fire which broke out was quickly extinguished by the airport emergency services. Although the plane was a complete write off, the 172 passengers and 10 crew all survived.
- On 23 July 1987, a hijacker was arrested by Swiss authorities on board an Air Afrique Douglas DC-10 after the plane had landed at Geneva to refuel. One passenger was shot and killed by the hijacker before he was overpowered by the crew prior to the plane being stormed by the authorities. 1 crew member and 3 other passengers were injured during the incident.
- On 20 March 1999, an Iberia MD-87, EC-GRL, had to land without its front undercarriage.
- On 17 February 2014, Ethiopian Airlines Flight 702 on scheduled service departing from Addis Ababa at 00:30 (local time) scheduled to arrive in Rome at 04:40 (local time) was forced to proceed to Geneva airport. The Boeing 767-300 (tail ET-AMF) was flying north over Sudan when it changed radio frequency to squawk 7500—which is used in case of hijacking. Nearing Geneva, the pilots communicated with air traffic control to inquire about possibility of hijackers receiving asylum in Switzerland. The aircraft circled the airport several times, before landing around 6:00 in the morning with one engine and less than 10 minutes of fuel remaining. The airport remained closed as the aircraft stayed on the tarmac. At 7:12 local time, the pilots communicated to ATC that they would be ready to disembark passengers in five minutes. The co-pilot of the plane was found to be the hijacker and was arrested. No passengers were harmed.

== Controversies ==
The airport's contribution to the economy and its nuisance are the subject of political and public debate. Neighbouring inhabitants and communes are opposed to its growth, particularly because of the noise caused by aircraft. The business community, for its part, has set up an association to defend the airport, AERIA+. Its members include the Fédération des Entreprises Romandes Genève, the Centre patronal and the Chambers of Commerce and Industry of Geneva and Vaud.

== In popular culture ==
- The old airport building, located next to the current building, is depicted in The Adventures of Tintin story "The Calculus Affair".

== See also ==
- Transport in Switzerland
- Swiss customs territory
