= Pato Kelesitse =

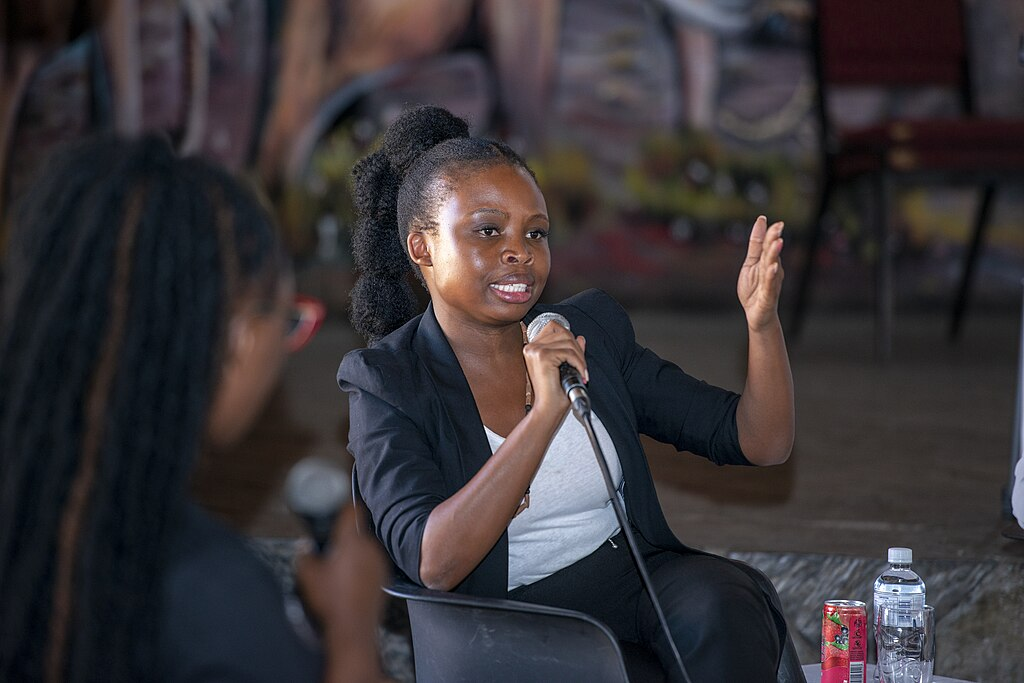
- Pato Kelesitse as a Panelist During a panel discussion themed " CLIMATE CHANGE IN BOTSWANA" hosted by the Wikimedia Community User Group Botswana as part of Wangari Maathai Day Celebrations
- Born: Kanye, Botswana
- Citizenship: Botswana
- Education: Masters in Developmental Studies
- Known for: Climate Justice

Pato Kelesitse is a climate justice activist from Gaborone, Botswana. Pato is also the Founder of Sustain267, a non-profit initiative fostering on climate justice solutions across Africa, she served as a Project Officer and now serves as a Sustainability Lead at the South African Climate Action Network.

== Biography ==
Pato was born in Kanye, Botswana. She holds a Bachelor of Arts (Honors) in Accounting and Finance, and she is also a candidate for Master of Arts in Development Studies at the University of Botswana. Pato is a delegate of the Government of Botswana to the United Nations Framework Convention on Climate Change. In 2019 Pato was named as one of the “40 under 40 African Leaders for Climate Resilience” by Wilton Park, an Executive Agency of the UK Foreign Office. She served as the coordinator of Resilient40, which is a network of over 60 young people in 29 African countries. Pato is a member of the World Economic Forum Global Shapers Community-Gaborone Hub.

== Activism ==
Pato's experience in advocacy includes youth and community engagement organizing, project coordination, as well as capacity building and documentation. As a feminist, she advocates for the adoption of African feminist principles in addressing the climate crisis. She was the African representative, as one of the global youth leaders at the UN Climate Summit in addressing world leaders on climate change as a global priority. She serves as an advisor for Urgent Action Fund-Africa and is a FuturElect Class of 2022 Fellow.
