= R. Stephen Berry =

American professor of physical chemistry (1931–2020)

- Born: Richard Stephen Berry; April 9, 1931; Denver, Colorado, U.S.
- Died: July 26, 2020 (aged 89); Chicago, Illinois, U.S.
- Education: Harvard University A.B. 1952; A.M., 1954; Ph.D., 1956
- Scientific career
- Fields: Physical chemistry
- Workplaces: University of Chicago
- Thesis: The electronic structure of butadiene (1956)
- Doctoral advisor: William Moffitt
- Doctoral students: Michael Oppenheimer; David Leitner
- Other notable students: David J. Wales (postdoc)

Richard Stephen Berry (April 9, 1931 – July 26, 2020) was an American professor of physical chemistry.

He was the James Franck Distinguished Service Professor, emeritus, at The University of Chicago. He was also special advisor for national security to the director, at Argonne National Laboratory.

== Career and research ==
A native of Denver, Colorado, Berry joined the Chicago faculty in 1964, having been an assistant professor at Yale University and, between 1957 and 1960, an instructor at the University of Michigan. At the University of Chicago, he has been a member of the department of chemistry, the James Franck Institute, the College, and, for many years, the Committee and then the School of Public Policy Studies.

He was home secretary of the National Academy of Sciences from 1999 until 2003. He has written one book, been co-author of four others, one with Stuart A. Rice and John Ross, another with Linda Gaines and Thomas V. Long, another with Vladimir Kazakov, Stanislaw Sieniutycz, Zbigniew Szwast, and Anatoly Tsirlin, and one with Boris Smirnov. He was named a MacArthur Fellow in 1983.

His scientific studies have included both experimental and theoretical work. His doctoral thesis, directed by William Moffitt, was on the subject of the electronic structure of butadiene. He then went on to study alkali halides in the gas phase, first at the University of Michigan and then at Yale, using shock waves to produce sufficient dissociation of the molecules to ions to make it feasible to observe the photodetachment spectra of the halide ions, thus determining the electron affinities of the halogen atoms to four or five significant figures. He worked at Michigan with Martin Stiles to observe the free benzyne in the gas phase, and then, at Yale, with a graduate student Margaret Emery and an undergraduate Jon Clardy, they found the meta and para isomers of benzyne. He also worked with Walter Lwowski to study nitrenes in the gas phase.

In 1964, he moved to The University of Chicago, where he has worked on atomic and ionic collision processes, photoionization, the nature of correlation of valence electrons in atoms, and, more recently, on atomic and molecular clusters, and on protein dynamics. He became interested in energy and its efficient use first through concern about Chicago's air pollution in the 1960s. This led to what we believe is one of the first public studies of what has become called "life cycle analysis". This was an analysis of the actual and ideal limiting energy and free energy use in the manufacture and disposal of the automobile, and was carried out with Margaret F. Fels. This led to many other such analyses, which now are done very frequently. This work, in turn, stimulated what has become known as "finite-time thermodynamics", the study of the optimal performance of processes constrained to operate in finite time or at nonzero rates. He has been very active in the study of atomic and molecular clusters, particularly in their phases and phase changes. This has led to a broader interest in bridging between the microscopic and macroscopic descriptions of physical systems, especially of finding the boundary below which a macroscopic description fails.

His interests, apart from traditional scientific studies, have included energy and energy policy (which he was teaching with the economist George Tolley), scientific integrity issues, scientific information, its distribution and its contributions to policy and governmental decisions including those of the courts, and science education, particularly the problem of science illiteracy.

== Personal life ==
Berry was married to Carla Friedman Berry. They had two grown daughters, one son, five grandsons, and three granddaughters. He died in July 2020 in Chicago.

== Publications ==
=== Books ===
- 2019 Three laws of nature: a little book on thermodynamics. New Haven: Yale University Press.
- 2002 (with Stuart A. Rice and John Ross) Physical and chemical kinetics (2nd. ed.). New York: Oxford University Press.
- 2000 (with Stuart A. Rice and John Ross) Physical chemistry (2nd. ed.). New York: Oxford University Press.
- 2000 (with V. Kazakov, S. Sieniutycz, Z. Szwast and A. M. Tsirlin) Thermodynamic optimization of finite-time processes. Chichester; New York: Wiley.
- 1991 Understanding energy: energy, entropy, and thermodynamics for everyman. Singapore; New Jersey: World Scientific.
- 1979 (with Linda Gaines and Thomas Veach Long II) TOSCA, the total social cost of coal and nuclear power. Cambridge, Mass.: Ballinger Pub. Co.
- 1978 (with Margaret Lounsbury and Sandra Hebenstreit) Resource analysis: Water and energy as linked resources (WRC Research Report NO. 134). University of Illinois at Urbana-Champaign. Water Resources Center.
