= Climate Action Network Latin America =

Latin American climate Justice organisation

- Founded: 2009
- Type: Non-governmental organization
- Headquarters: Buenos Aires, Argentina

Climate Action Network Latin America (CAN-LA or CANLA) is a Latin American climate justice organisation. Founded in 2009 and based in Buenos Aires, it is the regional network of the Climate Action Network and considered a "node" helping to collaborate in the Latin American and Caribbean region. It links over 30 non-governmental organisations, which are engaged in climate justice issues and active against climate change (as of 25 April 2020).

== Structure ==
The regional network is composed of more than 70 organizations from different countries in Latin America. Within CAN International, there is a regional officer. At the moment Karla Maass hold this position (as of 25 April 2020).

Member organisations of CAN-LA are located in:

- Argentina
- Barbados
- Bolivia
- Brazil
- Chile
- Colombia
- Haiti
- Honduras
- Mexico
- Paraguay
- Peru
- United States (Ciudadnía Sustentable frente al Cambio Climatico, A.C.)
- Uruguay
- Venezuela

== Activities ==
The regional node tries to foster networks between different organisations working in Central and Latin America. The organisation's reasoning behind it is that through collaboration, the organisations can more easily further the cause of climate justice.

One of the most important functions of the organisation is Latin American representation at UN climate conferences. Delegates of CAN-LA attend the climate negotiations under the UN Framework Convention on Climate Change (UNFCCC). They are present at the conferences of the parties (COP) and the intersessionals in Bonn. Since COP20 in 2014, they have press conferences to inform the public about their views. During COPs, they organise side events where they can set their own agenda and invite panelists. They also inform the public and publish reports, analyses and comments, for example in the Chilean newspaper "El dínamo". Before COP23, the network organised a webinar called "Camino a la COP23: Una visión desde América Latina y el Caribe".

After COP25, they wrote a report about their view on the negotiations and reflecting on the outcome. That the climate conference in 2019 was moved from Chile to Spain was considered a missed opportunity for Latin America, not only because many representatives could not be present, but also because a bigger cohesion within the region was not reached.

They reacted to the postponement of COP26 due to the COVID-19 pandemic with a common declaration highlighting that the health crisis is connected to the bigger ecological crisis and the most vulnerable communities are affected the most by both crises.
