= William Moffitt =

William E. Moffitt
- Born: 9 November 1925; Berlin, Germany
- Died: 19 December 1958 (aged 33); Cambridge, Massachusetts, United States
- Education: University of Oxford
- Scientific career
- Fields: Quantum chemistry
- Workplaces: Harvard University
- Thesis: The Electronic Structure of Coronene and Pyrene (1948)
- Doctoral advisor: Charles Coulson
- Doctoral students: R. Stephen Berry; S. M. Blinder

William E. Moffitt (9 November 1925 – 19 December 1958) was a British quantum chemist. He died after a heart attack following a squash match. He had been thought to be one of Britain's most gifted academics.

== Early life ==
Moffitt was born in Berlin, Germany to British parents; his father was working in Berlin on behalf of the British government. He was educated by private tuition up to the age of 11. He attended Harrow School from 1936–43. His chemistry master later said of him that "he was undoubtably the most able of a decade of gifted boys ... [and] has a profound effect on all who met him. He did more than anyone to create in the school the intellectual climate so necessary for the stimulation of young minds".

== Academic career ==
He then studied chemistry at New College, Oxford, under an open scholarship, and graduated with first class honours. His D.Phil. supervisor, Charles Coulson, later wrote:

[his] exuberant delight in life remained with him to the end. "Moffit's method of Atoms in Molecules" will remain for many years to remind us of his remarkable ability to initiate new ways of thinking in his professional subject.

After receiving his D.Phil. for research in quantum chemistry, he joined the research staff of the British Rubber Producers Research Association.

He was made an assistant professor at Harvard in January 1953, and was give an A.M Honoris Causa in 1955. His colleague Edgar Bright Wilson said:

Few men had as great an impact at so early an age. The reasons are clear. Few have been endowed with such a sparkling, quick and keen intelligence, with such a capacity for spending long hours in the thorough study of fundamental subjects ... His intellectual powers were not only applied to the solution of problems but perhaps even more to their wise selection. He avoided areas where only formal solutions were attainable, with no contact with experience.

Doctoral students who were advised by Moffitt include R. Stephen Berry and S. M. Blinder.

== Personal life and interests ==
He married Dorothy Silberman in 1956 and had a daughter, Alison in June 1958. He was a keen rugby player and enjoyed music and arts and particularly English literature. While sharing a cabin with a monk on a voyage to the UK from the US, he discussed the philosophy of religion with him in their only common language, Latin.
