= Michael Oppenheimer =

American climate scientist

- Oppenheimer in 2014
- Born: February 28, 1946 (age 80); New York City, New York, U.S.
- Education: Massachusetts Institute of Technology (S.B., Chemistry); University of Chicago (Ph.D, Chemical Physics)
- Scientific career
- Fields: Geosciences, International Affairs
- Workplaces: Princeton University
- Thesis: Ultraviolet spectra of alkalai halides in inert matrices. (1970)
- Doctoral advisor: R. Stephen Berry
- Website: Oppenheimer's homepage

Michael Oppenheimer (born February 28, 1946) is the Albert G. Milbank Professor of Geosciences and International Affairs in the Princeton School of Public and International Affairs, the Department of Geosciences, and the High Meadows Environmental Institute at Princeton University. He is the director of the Center for Policy Research on Energy and the Environment (C-PREE) at the Princeton School of Public and International Affairs and Faculty Associate of the Atmospheric and Ocean Sciences Program and the Princeton Institute for International and Regional Studies.

Oppenheimer has played a leading role at the interface of science and public policy including influencing the development of the acid rain provisions of the US Clean Air Act. He co-organized a series of activities that prefigured the emergence of climate change as a top international concern and influenced the development of the United Nations Framework Convention on Climate Change. He directed climate and air pollution activities at the Environmental Defense Fund when that NGO's science-based and incentive-based approach to climate change was reflected in the language of the Kyoto Protocol. Oppenheimer has played a significant role within the Nobel Prize-winning Intergovernmental Panel on Climate Change (IPCC), serving as Contributing Author, Lead Author, or Coordinating Lead Author on each assessment report since IPCC's first report, as well as two special reports. Oppenheimer also serves as a Review Editor on the Sixth Assessment Report.

Oppenheimer is a prominent public figure and has discussed various aspects of the impacts of and solutions to climate change and other issues in the media. He has testified before committees of the US Senate and House of Representatives on numerous occasions. He has also been a guest on many television and radio programs and talk shows, including This Week, The News Hour, The Oprah Winfrey Show, The Colbert Report, and 60 Minutes. Oppenheimer is the author of over 200 articles published in professional journals.

He is the author of Discerning Experts: The Practices of Scientific Assessment for Environmental Policy published in 2019 with several coauthors and Dead Heat: The Race Against The Greenhouse Effect, coauthored with Robert H. Boyle and published in 1990. Oppenheimer is co-founder of the Climate Action Network and has served on many expert panels including the New York City Panel on Climate Change and the US National Academies’ Board on Energy and Environmental Systems. He is a trustee of the NGOs Climate Central and Climate Science Legal Defense Fund. Oppenheimer also serves as co-editor-in-chief of the journal Climatic Change.

In 1989, Oppenheimer founded the Climate Action Network of over 1300 non-governmental organizations in over 130 countries working to limit human-induced climate change to ecologically sustainable levels.

Oppenheimer is not related to the nuclear physicist J. Robert Oppenheimer.

== Background ==
Oppenheimer was born February 28, 1946, in New York City.

He received an S.B. in chemistry from MIT, a Ph.D. in chemical physics from the University of Chicago, and pursued post-doctoral research at the Center for Astrophysics | Harvard & Smithsonian.

He joined the Princeton faculty after more than two decades with the Environmental Defense Fund (EDF), a non-governmental, environmental organization, where he served as chief scientist and manager of the Climate and Air Program. Prior to his position at the Environmental Defense Fund, Oppenheimer served as atomic and molecular astrophysicist at the Center for Astrophysics | Harvard & Smithsonian and lecturer on astronomy at Harvard University.

He continues to serve as a science advisor to EDF.

Oppenheimer won the 2010 Heinz Award in the Environment and is a Fellow of the American Association for the Advancement of Science.

== Research interests ==
His interests include science and policy of the atmosphere, particularly climate change and its impacts. Much of his research aims to understand the potential for "dangerous" outcomes of increasing levels of greenhouse gases by exploring the effects of global warming on ice sheets and sea level, and on patterns of human migration. He has assessed linkages among climate change, crop yields and Mexico–US cross-border migration. Oppenheimer studies the process of scientific learning and scientific assessments and their role in influencing public policies to respond to global change.

== Role in global science policy ==
Oppenheimer is a long-time participant in the Intergovernmental Panel on Climate Change (IPCC) which won the Nobel Peace Prize in 2007, serving recently as a Coordinating Lead Author of the Special Report on the Ocean and Cryosphere in a Changing Climate. In the late 1980s, Dr. Oppenheimer and a handful of other scientists organized two workshops under the auspices of the United Nations that helped precipitate the negotiations that resulted in the United Nations Framework Convention on Climate Change (signed at the 1992 Earth Summit) and the Kyoto Protocol. During that period, he co-founded the Climate Action Network. His research and advocacy work on acid rain also contributed to the passage of the 1990 amendments to the Clean Air Act and influenced the development of the Kyoto Protocol.

=== Assessment of the IPCC process ===
In 2007, he wrote about limitations of the IPCC consensus approach in Science Magazine. The current centralized assessment role of the IPCC allows for "communication in a monolithic message" but risks "ossification and eventual irrelevance" of the IPCC as an institution. According to him, the "problem of creating, defending, and communicating consensus, as well as departures from the consensus" had been discussed but not addressed until after the AR4. Oppenheimer notes important changes within the IPCC, including a stronger focus on uncertainty and risk management after publication of the InterAcademy Panel IAC 2010 IPCC review.

Together with Jessica O'Reilly and Naomi Oreskes, Oppenheimer discussed the way the risk of collapse of the West Antarctic Ice Sheet was assessed in IPCC reports in a Social Studies of Science paper in 2012. The authors cited the changes of IPCC chairpersons, authors teams, and chapter organization as reasons for an incomplete assessment of the ice sheet and resulting confusion among stakeholders. Oppenheimer and coauthors pursued the theme of treatment of uncertainty in assessments in subsequent papers, particularly Climate change prediction: erring on the side of least drama? (2013) and in the 2019 book, Discerning Experts: The Practice of Scientific Assessment for Environmental Policy. The latter reports the results of the first phase of an ongoing ethnographic study of many assessments that includes, in its subsequent phases, direct observation of parts of IPCC author meetings and consensus panels of the US National Research Council/National Academy of Sciences.

== Recent awards and honors ==
- 2000: League of Conservation Voters, Environmental Leadership Award
- 2001: Environmental Action Coalition Green Star Award
- 2005–2006: Russell Sage Foundation Visiting Scholar
- 2007: New Species Award, African Rainforest Conservancy
- 2009-2010: Russell Sage Foundation Associate Scholar
- 2010–2013: National Science Foundation Grant: Assessing Assessments
- 2010: Named as a AAAS Fellow
- 2010: Recipient, 2010 Heinz Award in the Environment
- 2014 Linacre Lecturer, Oxford University
- 2015: Agassiz Visiting Lecturer, Dept. Earth and Planetary Sciences, Harvard University

== Selected publications ==
Overview of publications at Google Scholar

- Gornitz, Vivien; Oppenheimer, Michael; Kopp, Robert; Orton, Philip; Buchanan, Maya; Lin, Ning; Horton, Radley; Bader, Daniel (March 2019). "New York City Panel on Climate Change 2019 Report Chapter 3: Sea Level Rise". Annals of the New York Academy of Sciences. 1439 (1): 71–94. Bibcode:2019NYASA1439...71G. doi:10.1111/nyas.14006. PMID 30875120.
- Bamber, Jonathan L.; Oppenheimer, Michael; Kopp, Robert E.; Aspinall, Willy P.; Cooke, Roger M. (4 June 2019). "Ice sheet contributions to future sea-level rise from structured expert judgment". Proceedings of the National Academy of Sciences. 116 (23): 11195–11200. Bibcode:2019PNAS..11611195B. doi:10.1073/pnas.1817205116. PMC 6561295. PMID 31110015.
- Hsiang, Solomon; Kopp, Robert; Jina, Amir; Rising, James; Delgado, Michael; Mohan, Shashank; Rasmussen, D. J.; Muir-Wood, Robert; Wilson, Paul; Oppenheimer, Michael; Larsen, Kate; Houser, Trevor (30 June 2017). "Estimating economic damage from climate change in the United States". Science. 356 (6345): 1362–1369. Bibcode:2017Sci...356.1362H. doi:10.1126/science.aal4369. PMID 28663496.
- Kopp, Robert E.; DeConto, Robert M.; Bader, Daniel A.; Hay, Carling C.; Horton, Radley M.; Kulp, Scott; Oppenheimer, Michael; Pollard, David; Strauss, Benjamin H. (December 2017). "Evolving Understanding of Antarctic Ice-Sheet Physics and Ambiguity in Probabilistic Sea-Level Projections". Earth's Future. 5 (12): 1217–1233. arXiv:1704.05597. Bibcode:2017EaFut...5.1217K. doi:10.1002/2017EF000663.
- Buchanan, Maya K; Oppenheimer, Michael; Kopp, Robert E (1 June 2017). "Amplification of flood frequencies with local sea level rise and emerging flood regimes". Environmental Research Letters. 12 (6): 064009. Bibcode:2017ERL....12f4009B. doi:10.1088/1748-9326/aa6cb3.
- O'Neill, Brian C.; Oppenheimer, Michael; Warren, Rachel; Hallegatte, Stephane; Kopp, Robert E.; Pörtner, Hans O.; Scholes, Robert; Birkmann, Joern; Foden, Wendy; Licker, Rachel; Mach, Katharine J.; Marbaix, Phillippe; Mastrandrea, Michael D.; Price, Jeff; Takahashi, Kiyoshi; van Ypersele, Jean-Pascal; Yohe, Gary (January 2017). "IPCC reasons for concern regarding climate change risks" (PDF). Nature Climate Change. 7 (1): 28–37. Bibcode:2017NatCC...7...28O. doi:10.1038/nclimate3179.
- Oppenheimer, Michael; Little, Christopher M.; Cooke, Roger M. (May 2016). "Expert judgement and uncertainty quantification for climate change". Nature Climate Change. 6 (5): 445–451. Bibcode:2016NatCC...6..445O. doi:10.1038/nclimate2959.
- Kopp RE, et al. (2014). "Probabilistic 21st and 22nd century sea-level projections at a global network of tide gauge sites". Earth's Future. 2 (8): 383–406. Bibcode:2014EaFut...2..383K. doi:10.1002/2014EF000239. hdl:2060/20160001331.
- Bohra-Mishra, Pratikshya; Oppenheimer, Michael; Hsiang, Solomon M. (8 July 2014). "Nonlinear permanent migration response to climatic variations but minimal response to disasters". Proceedings of the National Academy of Sciences. 111 (27): 9780–9785. Bibcode:2014PNAS..111.9780B. doi:10.1073/pnas.1317166111. PMC 4103331. PMID 24958887.
- Lloyd, Ian D.; Oppenheimer, Michael (May 2014). "On the Design of an International Governance Framework for Geoengineering". Global Environmental Politics. 14 (2): 45–63. doi:10.1162/GLEP_a_00228. S2CID 20434511.
- Little, Christopher M.; Urban, Nathan M.; Oppenheimer, Michael (26 February 2013). "Probabilistic framework for assessing the ice sheet contribution to sea level change". Proceedings of the National Academy of Sciences. 110 (9): 3264–3269. Bibcode:2013PNAS..110.3264L. doi:10.1073/pnas.1214457110. PMC 3587274. PMID 23404697.
- Lin, Ning; Emanuel, Kerry; Oppenheimer, Michael; Vanmarcke, Erik (June 2012). "Physically based assessment of hurricane surge threat under climate change". Nature Climate Change. 2 (6): 462–467. Bibcode:2012NatCC...2..462L. doi:10.1038/NCLIMATE1389. hdl:1721.1/75773.
- Feng A. Krueger (2010). "Linkages among climate change, crop yields and Mexico–US cross-border migration". Proc Natl Acad Sci USA. 107 (32): 14257–14262. Bibcode:2010PNAS..10714257F. doi:10.1073/pnas.1002632107. PMC 2922556. PMID 20660749.
- Kopp RE, et al. (2009). "Probabilistic assessment of sea level during the Last Interglacial stage". Nature. 462 (7275): 863–7. arXiv:0903.0752. Bibcode:2009Natur.462..863K. doi:10.1038/nature08686. PMID 20016591. S2CID 4313168.
- Oppenheimer, Michael; Petsonk, Annie (December 2005). "Article 2 of the UNFCCC: Historical Origins, Recent Interpretations". Climatic Change. 73 (3): 195–226. Bibcode:2005ClCh...73..195O. doi:10.1007/s10584-005-0434-8. S2CID 154952956.
- O'Neill, B. C.; Oppenheimer, Michael (14 June 2002). "Dangerous Climate Impacts and the Kyoto Protocol". Science. 296 (5575): 1971–1972. doi:10.1126/science.1071238. PMID 12065820. S2CID 128867949.
- Oppenheimer, Michael (1998). "Global warming and the stability of the West Antarctic Ice Sheet" (PDF). Nature. 393 (6683): 325–332. Bibcode:1998Natur.393..325O. doi:10.1038/30661. S2CID 4326925. Archived from the original (PDF) on 2009-05-21.
- Fisher, Diane C.; Oppenheimer, Michael (May 1991). "Atmospheric nitrogen deposition and the Chesapeake Bay estuary". Ambio. 20 (3/4): 102.
- Epstein CB, Oppenheimer M (1986). "Empirical relation between sulphur dioxide emissions and acid deposition derived from monthly data". Nature. 323 (6085): 245–7. Bibcode:1986Natur.323..245E. doi:10.1038/323245a0. S2CID 4271498.
- Oppenheimer, M. (February 1975). "Gas phase chemistry in comets". The Astrophysical Journal. 196: 251. Bibcode:1975ApJ...196..251O. doi:10.1086/153409. hdl:2060/19760013994.
- Oppenheimer M, Dalgarno A (1974). "The Fractional Ionization in Dense Interstellar Clouds". Astrophysical Journal. 192 (1): 29–32. Bibcode:1974ApJ...192...29O. doi:10.1086/153030.
