= David Leitner =

American chemist

David M. Leitner is an American chemist currently Professor at University of Nevada, Reno and an Elected Fellow of the American Association for the Advancement of Science.

== Education ==
He earned his B.S. at Cornell University in 1985 and then his Ph.D at University of Chicago in 1989 under R. Stephen Berry.

== Research ==
His interests are energy-molecule relations and his highest paper is An extended dynamical hydration shell around proteins, according to Google Scholar.

== Publications ==
- Leitner, David M.; Buchenberg, Sebastian; Brettel, Paul; Stock, Gerhard (21 February 2015). "Vibrational energy flow in the villin headpiece subdomain: Master equation simulations". The Journal of Chemical Physics. 142 (7). AIP Publishing: 075101. Bibcode:2015JChPh.142g5101L. doi:10.1063/1.4907881. ISSN 0021-9606. PMID 25702030.
- Agbo, Johnson K.; Xu, Yao; Zhang, Ping; Straub, John E.; Leitner, David M. (31 May 2014). "Vibrational energy flow across heme–cytochrome c and cytochrome c–water interfaces". Theoretical Chemistry Accounts. 133 (7). Springer Science and Business Media LLC. doi:10.1007/s00214-014-1504-7. ISSN 1432-881X. S2CID 95682223.
- Meister, Konrad; Duman, John G.; Xu, Yao; DeVries, Arthur L.; Leitner, David M.; Havenith, Martina (27 May 2014). "The Role of Sulfates on Antifreeze Protein Activity". The Journal of Physical Chemistry B. 118 (28). American Chemical Society (ACS): 7920–7924. doi:10.1021/jp5006742. ISSN 1520-6106. PMID 24821472.
- Agbo, Johnson K.; Gnanasekaran, Ramachandran; Leitner, David M. (1 April 2014). "Communication Maps: Exploring Energy Transport through Proteins and Water". Israel Journal of Chemistry. 54 (8–9). Wiley: 1065–1073. doi:10.1002/ijch.201300139. ISSN 0021-2148. S2CID 98844769.
