= Blinder (surname) =

Blinder is a surname. Notable people with the surname include:

- Alan Blinder (born 1945), American economist, former Federal Reserve Vice Chairman
- Martin Blinder (born 1937), American forensic psychiatrist
- Naoum Blinder (1889–1965), Ukrainian-American virtuoso violinist and teacher
- Olga Blinder (1921–2008), Paraguayan painter, engraver and sculptor
- Seymour Blinder (born 1932), American scientist
