= NOÉ21 =

Swiss non-governmental climate organisation

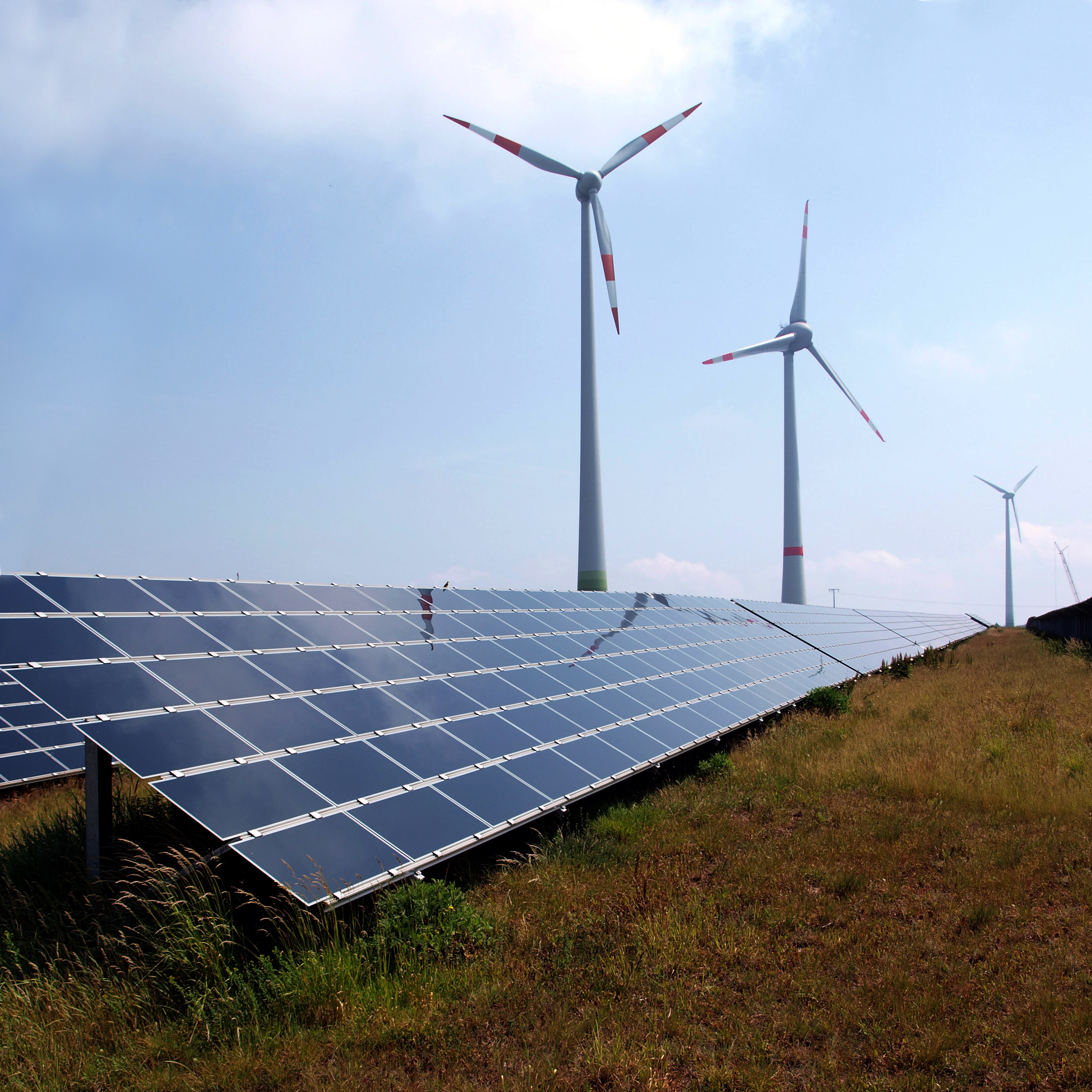
To reduce global warming, Noé21 supports efforts to cut emissions of greenhouse gas.

Noé21 (from the French: Nouvelle orientation économique pour le 21ème siècle, meaning "New economic orientation for the 21st century") is a non-governmental organisation founded in 2003 and based in Geneva. It promotes solutions to climate change.

Noé21 is a member of the Swiss Climate Alliance, the Alliance for Climate (Alliance pour le climat), of the European Council for an Energy Efficient Economy, of the European Environmental Bureau and of the Climate Action Network. The organisation is also accredited to the United Nations Framework Convention on Climate Change.

== Activities ==
Noé21 promotes energy transition to fight climate change. It evaluates solutions (centre of expertise) and advocates them to decision makers (think tank), through research, seminars, animations in schools and public events.

Together with the Green Party of Switzerland and Greenpeace, Noé21 is currently evaluating having recourse to the judiciary to protect climate.

== See also ==
- Fossil fuel divestment
