= S. M. Blinder =

American academic (1932–2024)

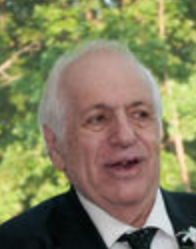

Seymour Michael Blinder (March 11, 1932 – September 4, 2024) was an American academic who was professor emeritus of chemistry and physics at the University of Michigan, Ann Arbor and a remote working senior scientist with Wolfram Research in Champaign, Illinois.

== Background ==
Blinder was born in New York City on March 11, 1932. He attended Cornell University and received an A.B. in physics and chemistry in 1953. Blinder received an A.M. in physics in 1955 and a Ph.D. in chemical physics in 1958 from Harvard University under Professors W. E. Moffitt and J. H. van Vleck (Nobel Laureate in Physics 1977).

Blinder died on September 4, 2024, at the age of 92.

== Academic positions ==
- Johns Hopkins University, Applied Physics Laboratory, senior physicist, 1958–1961
- Carnegie Institute of Technology (now Carnegie-Mellon University), assistant professor, 1961–1962
- Harvard University, visiting professor, 1962–1963
- Visiting research fellow, University College London, 1965–1966
- Visiting research fellow, Centre de Méchanique Ondulatoire Appliquée, Paris, 1970
- Visiting research fellow, Mathematical Institute, Oxford, 1971
- University of Michigan, professor, 1963–1995
- University of Michigan, professor emeritus 1996–present
- Wolfram Research Inc., senior scientist 2007-present

== Honors and awards ==
Blinder has received the following awards and honors:

- Phi Beta Kappa, 1953
- National Science Foundation Predoctoral Fellowships, 1953–1955
- Guggenheim Fellowship, 1965–1966
- National Science Foundation Senior Postdoctoral Fellowship, 1970–1971
- Rackham Research Fellowships, University of Michigan, 1966 and 1977

== Interests ==
Research interests included: theoretical chemistry, mathematical physics, applications of quantum mechanics to atomic and molecular structure, theory and applications of Coulomb Propagators, structure and self-energy of the electron, supersymmetric quantum field theory, quantum computers.

During his academic career, Blinder taught a multitude of courses in graduate level Quantum Mechanics, Statistical Mechanics, Thermodynamics, Electromagnetic Theory, Relativity, and Mathematical Physics.

Personal interests included: playing cello, classical music, and chess (S M is a former Junior Chess Master).

== Books and publications ==
Blinder authored over 200 journal articles in theoretical chemistry and mathematical physics. He also published six books:

- Advanced Physical Chemistry; A Survey of Modern Theoretical Principles (Macmillan, New York, 1969)
- Foundations of Quantum Dynamics (Academic Press, London, 1974)
- Introduction to Quantum Mechanics (Elsevier Academic Press, 2004; 2nd Edition 2020)
- Guide to Essential Math: For Students in Physics, Chemistry, and Engineering (Elsevier Academic Press, 2008; 2nd Edition 2013)
- Twenty-First Century Quantum Mechanics: Hilbert Space to Quantum Computers (Springer, 2017)
- Mathematical Physics in Theoretical Chemistry (Elsevier, 2019)
- Mathematics, Physics & Chemistry with the Wolfram Language (World Scientific, 2022)
