= Climate Action Network =

Global network of environmental NGOs

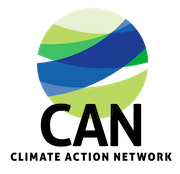
- Abbreviation: CAN
- Formation: 1989 (37 years ago)
- Type: Advocacy group
- Legal status: Non-profit, non-governmental
- Purpose: Network of over 1300 non-governmental organizations in over 130 countries working to limit human-induced climate change to ecologically sustainable levels
- Headquarters: Bonn, Germany
- Region served: Worldwide
- Official language: English
- Key people: Michael Oppenheimer (founder)
- Staff: 28 (2020)
- Website: www.climatenetwork.org

Climate Action Network - International (CAN) is a global network of over 1,800 environmental non-governmental organisations in over 130 countries, which are working to promote government and individual action to limit human-induced climate change to ecologically sustainable levels.

== Activities ==
It participated in the meetings of the United Nations Framework Convention on Climate Change. The group also published civil society's ECO newsletter presenting the views of civil society and communities around the world during the climate negotiations, and the satirical Fossil of the Day Awards. Adding to that, the group presented the countries who are blocking the progress at the climate negotiations in implementing the United Nations Climate Change Conference.

This group's members work to achieve the coordination of information exchange and non-governmental organizational strategy on international, regional, and national climate issues. They work for a healthy environment and development that "meets the needs of the present without compromising the ability of future generations to meet their own needs" (Brundtland Commission). With the vision to protect the atmosphere, the Climate Action Network opts for sustainable and equitable development worldwide. It was founded in 1989 by Michael Oppenheimer in West Germany, which quickly would reunify into Germany.

== Regional and national networks ==
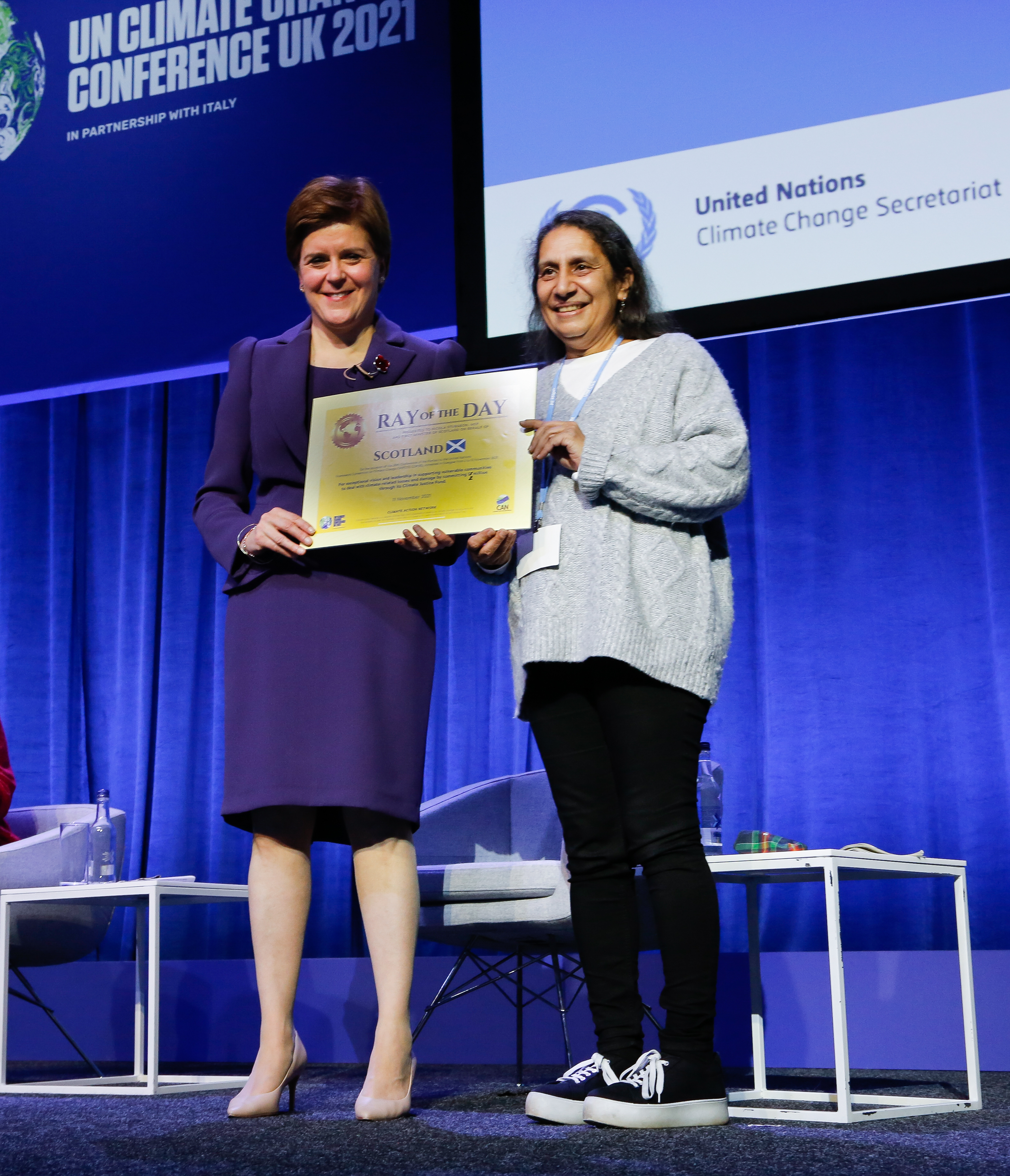
Tasneem Essop gives the Scottish First Minister a "Ray of the Day" award at COP26 - other countries were given Fossil of the Day.

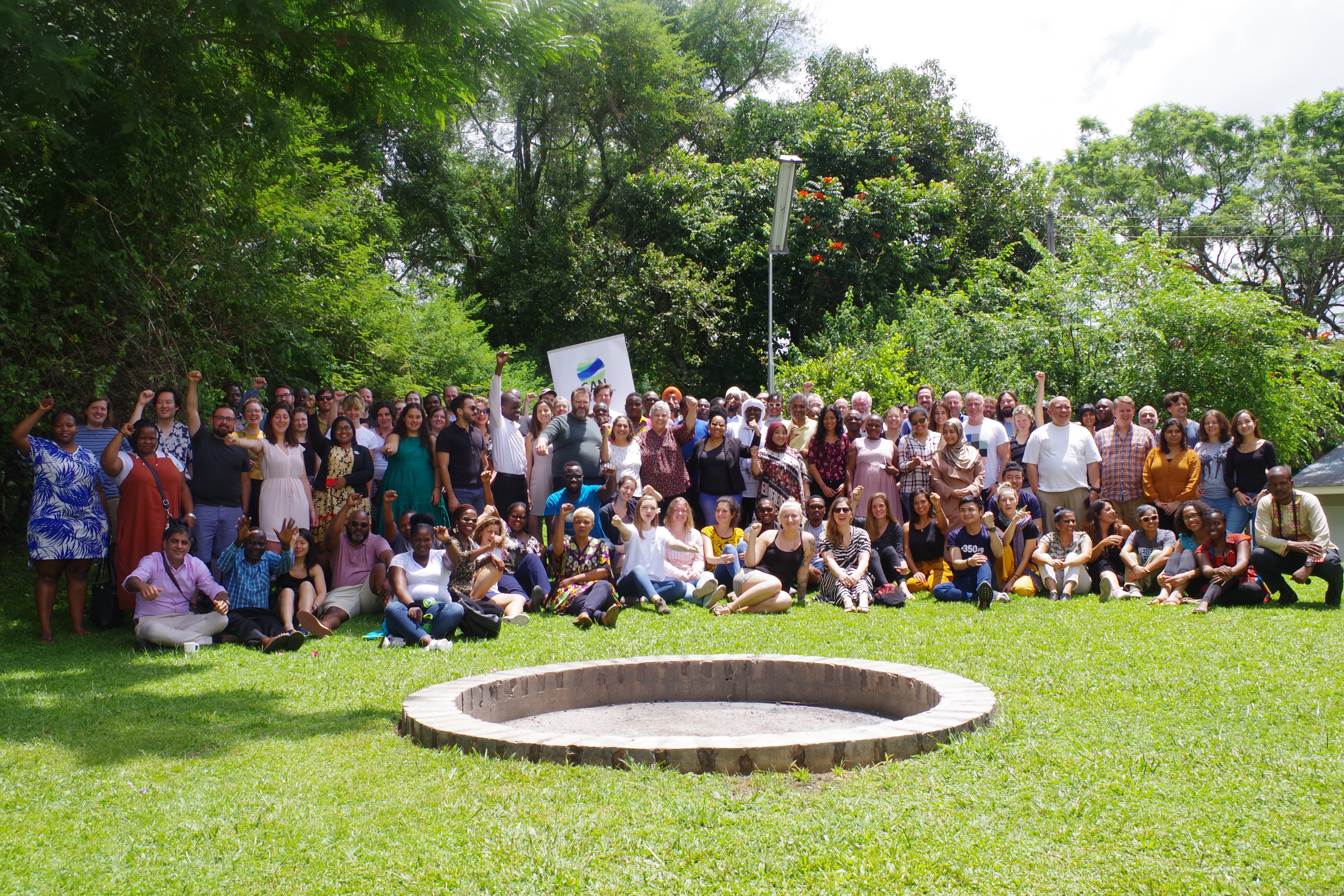
CAN Annual Strategy Session 2020 in Arusha, Tanzania

CAN has formal regional and national networks called nodes which coordinate these efforts.

=== Regional Nodes ===
- CAN-Arab World
- CAN-Eastern Africa
- CAN Eastern Europe, Caucasus and Central Asia (CAN-EECCA)
- CAN-Europe
- CAN Latin American (CANLA)
- Pacific Islands CAN (PICAN)
- CAN-South Asia (CANSA)
- Southern African Region CAN (SARCAN)
- CAN-South East Asia (CANSEA)
- CAN West and Central Africa (CANWA)

=== National Network Nodes ===
- CAN-Australia (CANA)
- CAN-Rac Canadian
- CAN-China (informal)
- Réseau Action Climat France
- CAN-Japan
- New Zealand Climate Action Network
- CAN-South Africa (SACAN)
- CAN-Tanzania
- CAN-Uganda
- US Climate Action Network (USCAN)

=== Climate Action Network Tanzania ===
Climate Action Network Tanzania is an environmental non-governmental and non-profit organization founded in 2011, with its headquarters in Dar es Salaam, Tanzania. It operates under the umbrella organisation Climate Action Network International. Since its inception, it has established partnerships with more than 50 civil society organizations across the country, as well as a number of government ministries and agencies including environment, local government, agriculture, livestock and fisheries, energy (department of renewable energy and policy), natural resources and tourism, water, work and finance especially the Planning Commission. It also works with the parliamentary standing committees and research institutions, in furtherance of implementing a Low Carbon Growth and the adaption to current climate change impacts

==== Objectives ====
Climate Action Network Tanzania
- Type: Advocacy group
- Headquarters: Dar Es Salaam, Tanzania
- Official language: English, Kiswahili
- Board of directors: Sixbert Mwanga
- Website: www.cantz.or.tz

Together with its stakeholders, Climate Action Network Tanzania works towards climate sustainability and poverty reduction through enhanced community livelihood activities and a climate-resilient economy. Promoting renewable energy, reducing emissions from deforestation and forest degradation programmes and the sustainable use of water resources, it is fostering a low carbon development. Moreover, its goal is to develop a networking structure in order to inform and empower the Tanzanian community, providing a platform for public dialogues, with the purpose of giving Tanzania a national voice in the international climate change debate and raise awareness to enforce a climate-resilient behaviour. Climate Action Network Tanzania targets the implementation of effective national policies, strategies and actions concerning climate change impacts. Furthermore, their mission is bringing the international climate agenda into the local context of Tanzania to embrace Agenda 2030 and the Paris Agreement. In the interest of an accurate operation and socio-economic development Climate Action Network Tanzania undertakes scientific research on climate change and environment development in several areas throughout Tanzania.

Its areas of work are:

- Water resources
- Renewable energy
- Low carbon development
- Climate finance
- Poverty & livelihood
- Capacity building
- Agenda 2030 & Paris agreement
- Adaption
- Food and agriculture

==== Projects ====
Climate Action Network Tanzania organizes workshops and seminars among stakeholders from government institutions and ministries, the private sector, development partners, and civil society. It does this by discussing the current and future climate change as well as the environmental-related effects on community well-being and economic growth. Its projects, include:

- Aligning climate resilience, sustainable development and poverty reduction in Tanzania
- Participatory and inclusive planning and implementation: A capacity enhancement approach for community resilience and sustainable development in western Kilimanjaro-Lake Natron ecosystem

==== Finance ====
Climate Action Network Tanzania is a non-profit and non-governmental organization. It finances itself through sponsoring, donations, and financial backing from foundations. Its fundraising is based on its ethical fundraising strategy, which includes that it neither takes money from foundations whose ethics do not align with theirs nor accepts money bound to conditions that would modify their work or representation.

== Member organizations ==
As of May 2026, CAN has over 1,800 member organisations around the world, based in over 130 countries. Using an internal platform, the CAN Community Site, the organisations can connect with each other and with the Network's International Secretariat.

- USCAN (US Climate Action Network)
- NOÉ21 (Geneva)

== See also ==
- Individual and political action on climate change
- Chesapeake Climate Action Network
