= Air Littoral =

Regional airline of France (1972–2004)

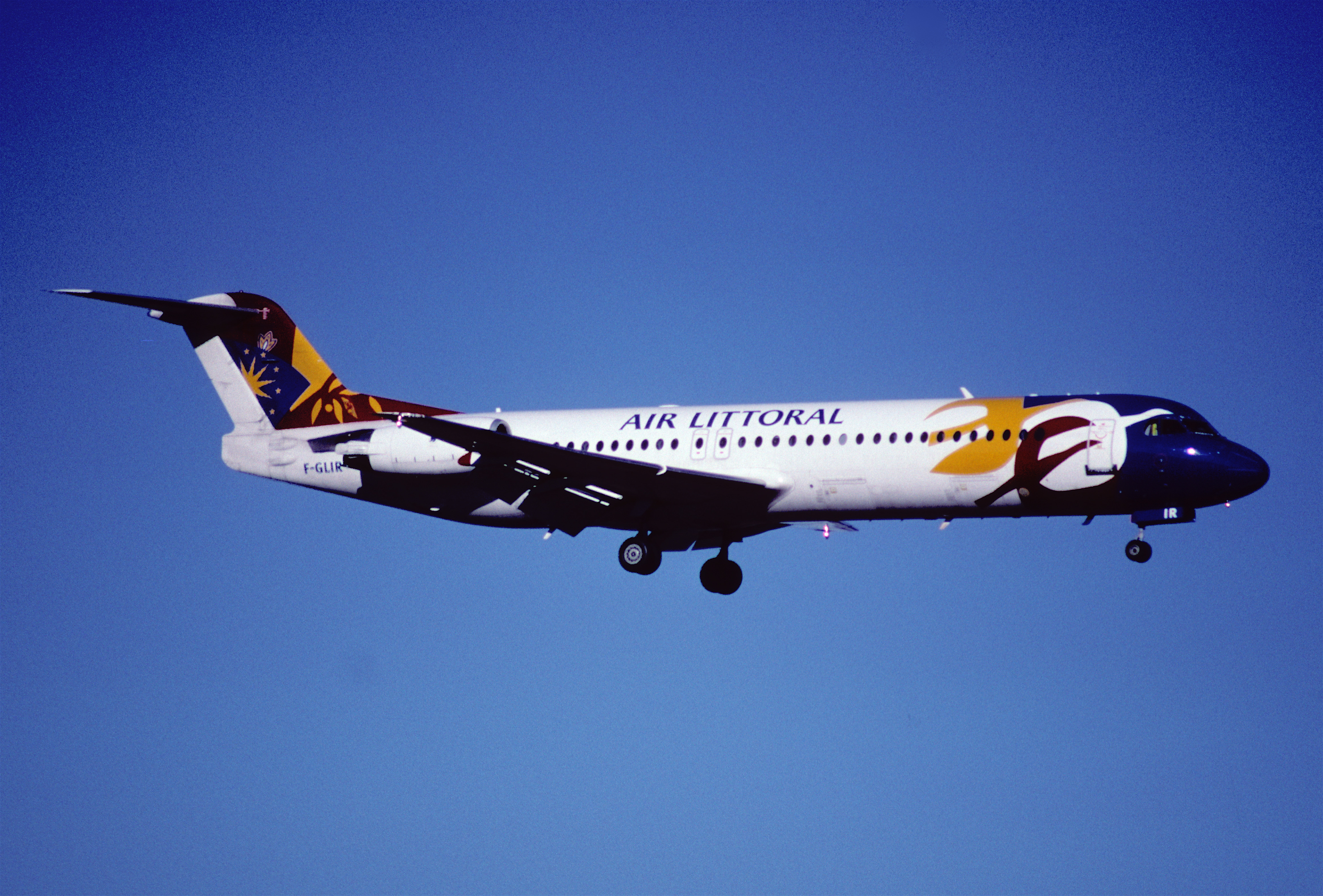
- Fokker 100
| IATA | ICAO | Call sign |
|---|---|---|
| FU | LIT | AIR LITTORAL |
- Founded: April 1972
- Commenced operations: 23 May 1972
- Ceased operations: February 2004
- Operating bases: Marseille; Montpellier; Nice; Paris–Orly
- Frequent-flyer program: Qualiflyer
- Headquarters: Montpellier, France
- Key people: Marc Dufour (President)

Air Littoral was a French regional airline based at Montpellier–Méditerranée Airport that operated from early 1970s to 2004. The airline flew domestic services as well as a small group of regional routes to nearby nations. The airline also operated feeder services on Air France behalf.

== History ==
=== The beginning ===
The airline roots went back to April 1972 when a small air company named Logistair was established with an operational base at Castellet airfield. A Britten-Norman BN.2 Islander flew on a scheduled basis on the route Nice-Montpellier-Perpignan along Mediterranean coastline. The financial results were not encouraging and the bank which supported the airline asked the management for a drastic change. The challenge was taken up by Robert Da Ros, both shareholder and pilot.

In a short period of time the opartional base was moved to Montpellier-Méditerranée Airport, close to Montpellier city and the tiny airline renamed Air Littoral S.A. In 1975 it headquartered at Aérodrome du Castellet. In the years 1976–1977, routes Montpellier-Nice et Montpellier-Mende-Clermont Ferrand were opened. Marc Jorel, who imported Brazilian-manufactured Embraer, joined the shareholders. By consequence firstly the airline procured up to eight Embraer EMB 110 Bandeirantes followed by twelwe Embraer EMB 120 Brasilias. In 1981 it launched the first international route, from Nice to Milan, followed by another one from Nice to Venice in 1982. It has to be noted that the air carrier was the first European customer of ATR 42 with which it was established a relationship of extreme trust and which led to ordering other aircraft (21 in total) and also of the successor ATR 72.

=== Expansion through merger ===
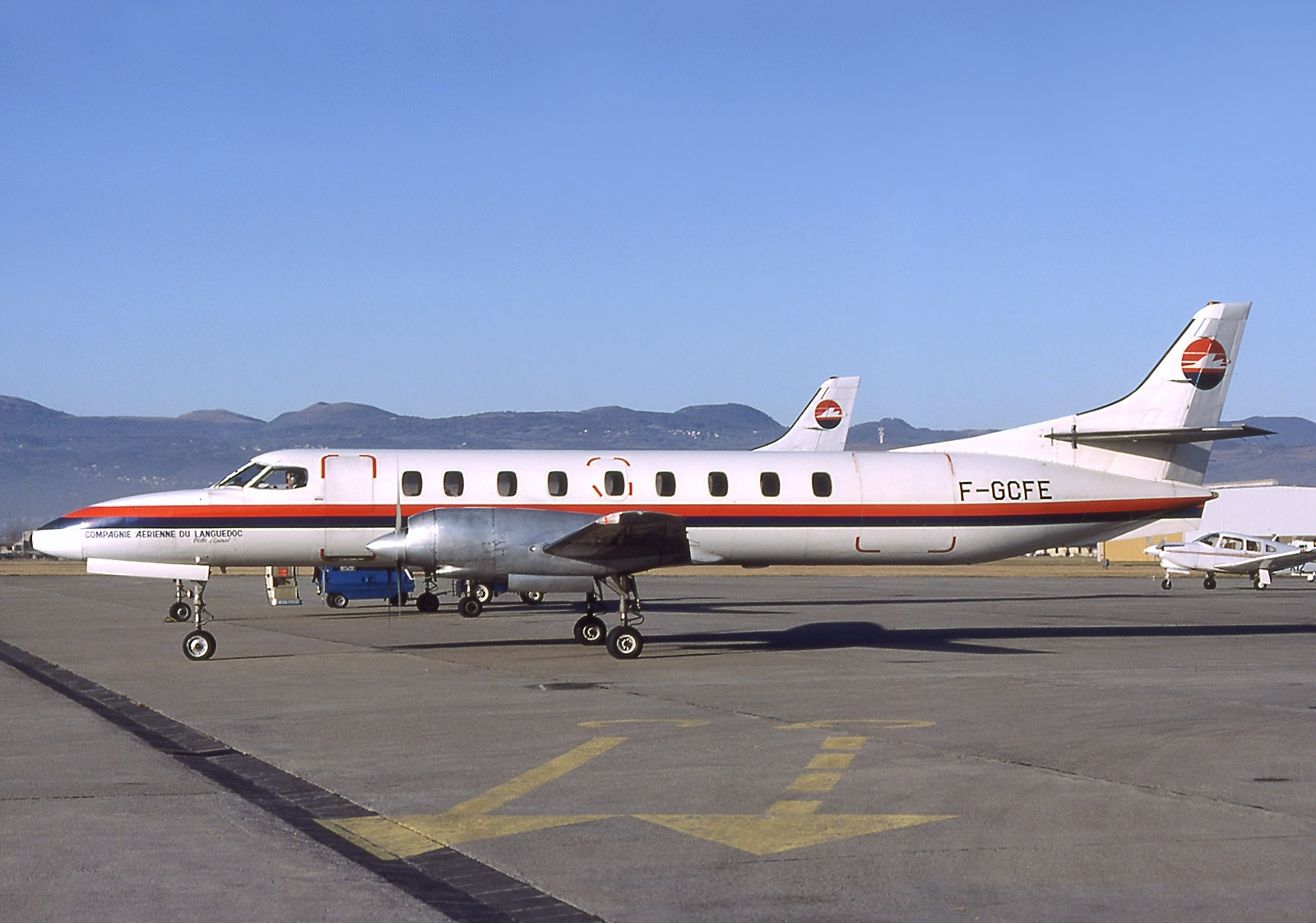
Compagnie Aérienne du Languedoc Fairchild Swearingen Metroliner SA-226TC

Between the end of 1987 and the beginning of 1988 the company expanded after the merger with Compagnie Aérienne du Languedoc and on 1 January took on the new corporate name Compagnie Air Littoral. On 20 Novembre 1992 an agreement between the airline shareholders - mainly KLM - and Euralair gave this well-established charter airline the majority of shares. Services on Air France behalf were begun in 1993.

In the fall of 1996, the subsidiary Air Littoral Riviera, also supported by the Principality of Monaco (24%), was established to manage routes hinged on Nice. In the following year, the Air Littoral Express branch for the transport of parcels and freight was established. It would use twin-engined Beechcraft 1900 aircraft. In the meanwhile, in early 1997, the airline signed a firm order for seven Bombardier CRJ, becoming the launch customer in Europe. On 31 March 1998, Cie. Air Littoral and Air Littoral Riviera proceeded with fusion-absorption under the only brand of Air Littoral.

Over the years also Lufthansa and the SAir Group (Swissair), which sold their 49% stake in 2001, all had ownership stakes in Air Littoral. A takeover failed in 2003 and the company went into receivership in the month of August and thereafter it was declared bankrupt. A number of groups considered taking over Air Littoral, but none succeeded and the airline was closed down by the French authorities in February 2004. At this date Air Littoral had a fleet of 17 Canadair CRJ-100s distributed in bases such as Nice, Montpellier, Paris (Orly) and Marseille, and was well known for the bright livery that the aircraft sported in the years before its demise.

== Fleet ==
Air Littoral has operated the following aircraft throughout its existence:

- ATR 42
- ATR 72
- Beechcraft 1900
- Boeing 737-300
- Bombardier CRJ
- Embraer EMB 110 Bandeirante (4)
- Embraer EMB 120 Brasilia
- Fairchild Swearingen Metroliner
- Fokker F27 Friendship
- Fokker 70
- Fokker 100
- Nord 262

=== Air Littoral photographic gallery ===
in chronological, delivery and livery order

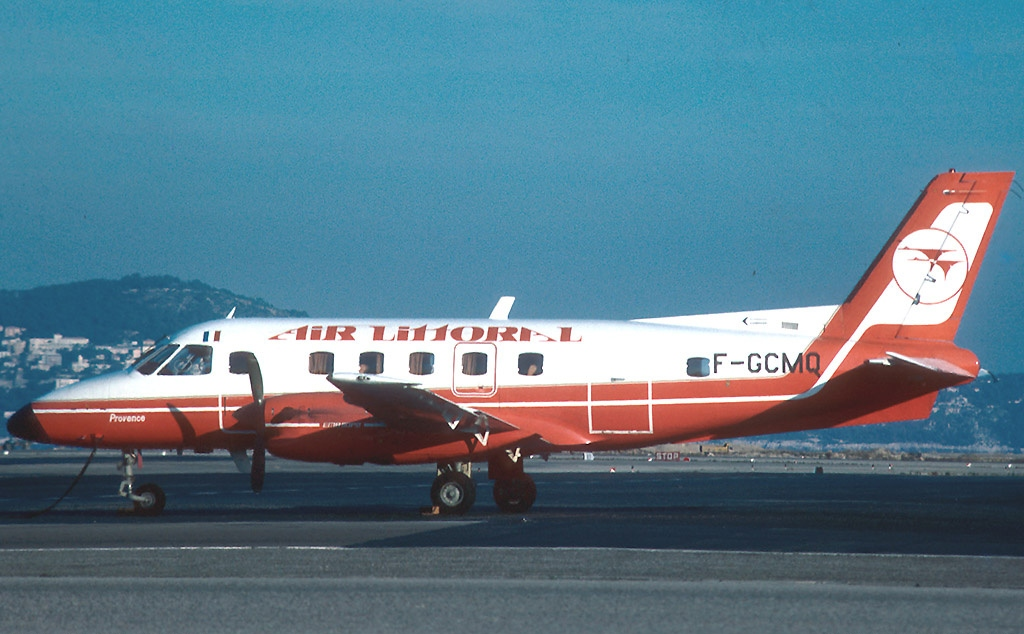
Embraer EMB 110 Bandeirante

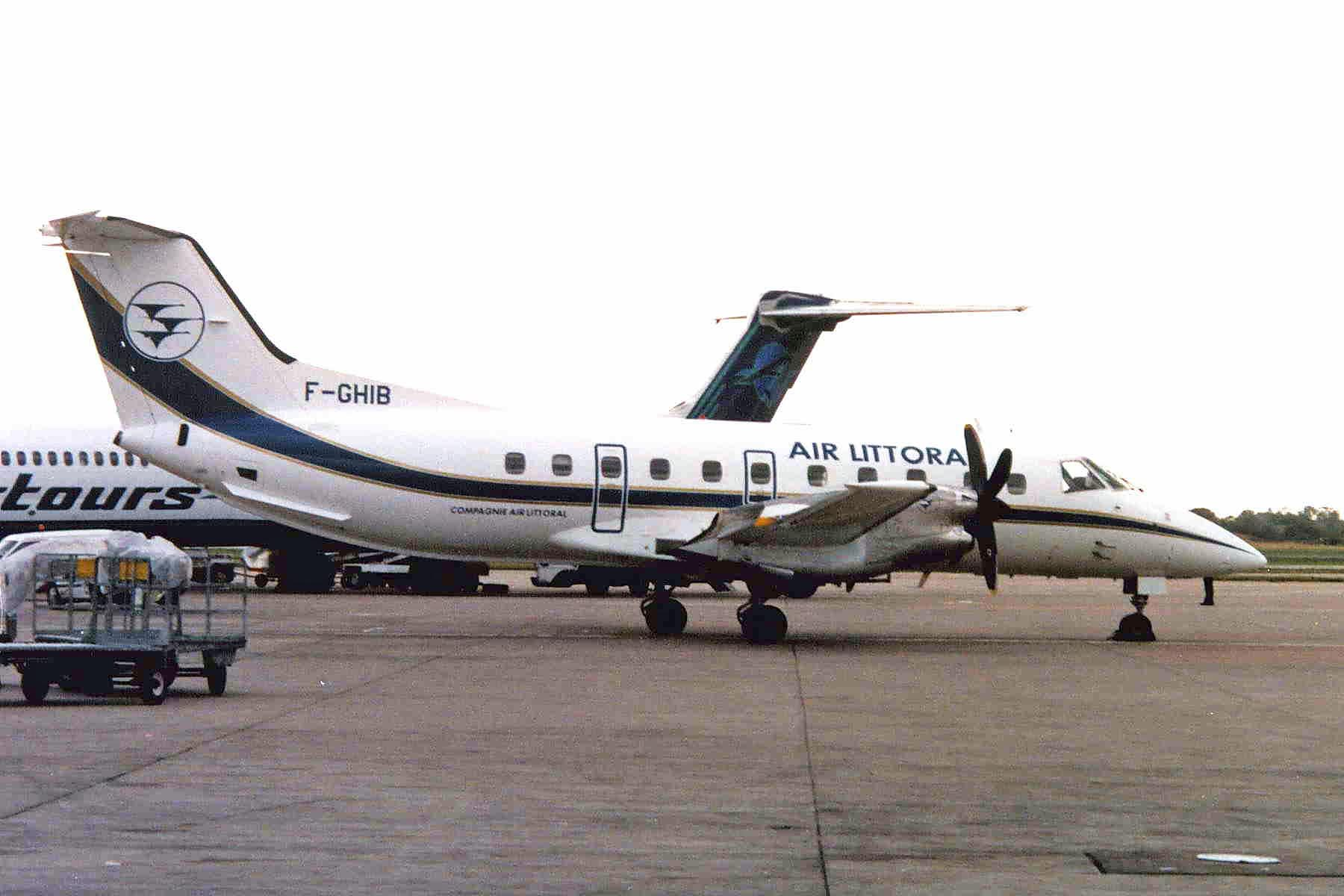
Embraer EMB 120 Brasilia

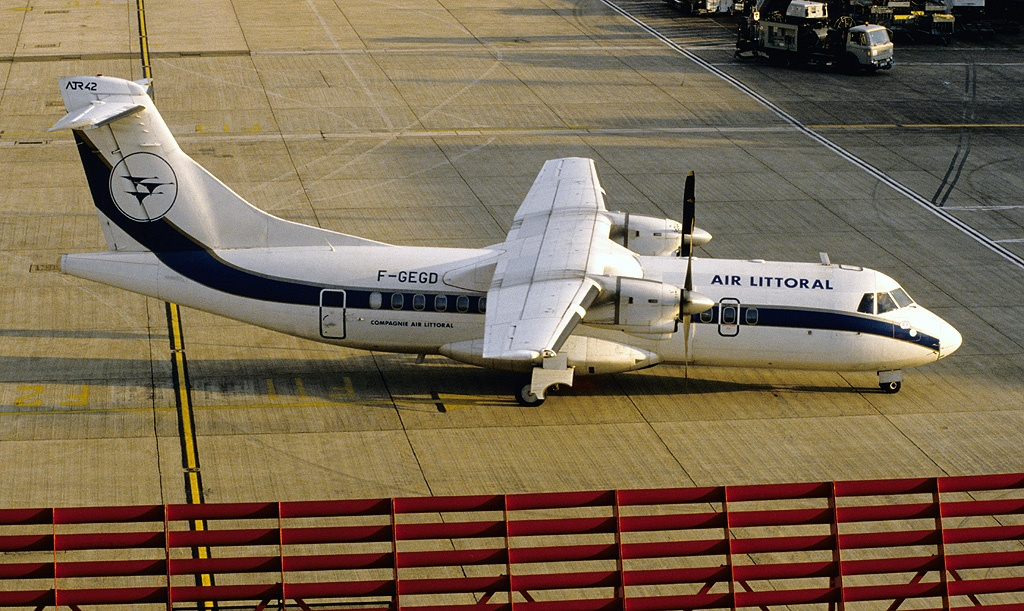
ATR 42

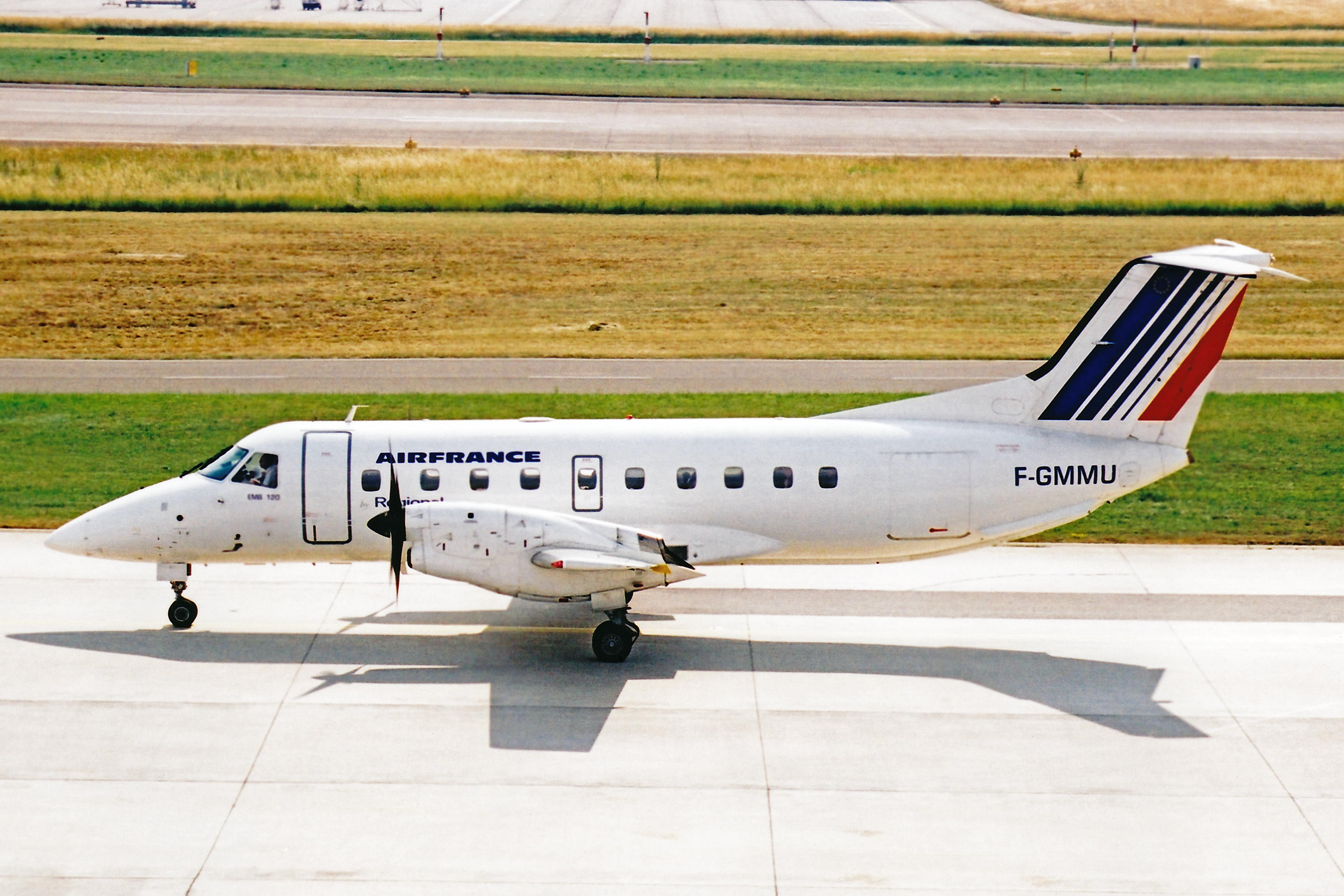
Embraer EMB 120 Brasilia

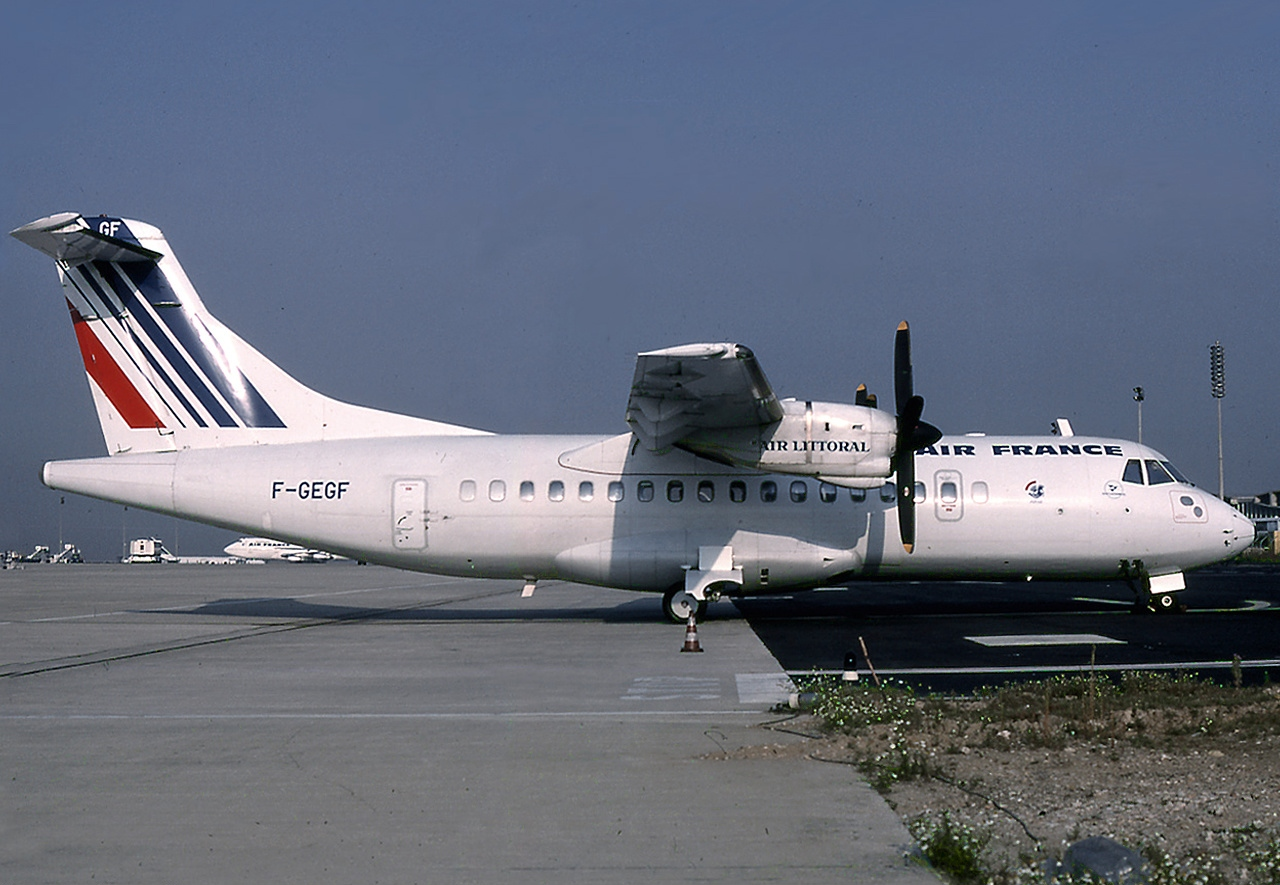
ATR 42

=== Cie. Air Littoral photographic gallery ===
In the 1990s, Air Littoral approached Metzler & Associés of Paris for a new identity which would propel it into a new market, and that is what was delivered. However, the design, a mix-and-match collection of identity elements, was so innovative that the airline's executives were afraid to implement it - until they called a company-wide meeting and showed Air Littoral employees models of the aircraft painted in the vivid new style. Marc-Antoine Herrmann, creative director & lead designer for the project, told airline officers, "We must show all the positive things associated with the south - its warmth, friendliness and joie de vivre. This is your difference, and you must use it so people will feel they take a part of the south with them when they go on board". To help the design team develop a palette and graphic approach unique to the south, mood boards were created, displaying photos of the region and examples of its rich graphic heritage.

— Taken from Step-by-Step Graphics magazine, circa 1993

in chronological, delivery and livery order

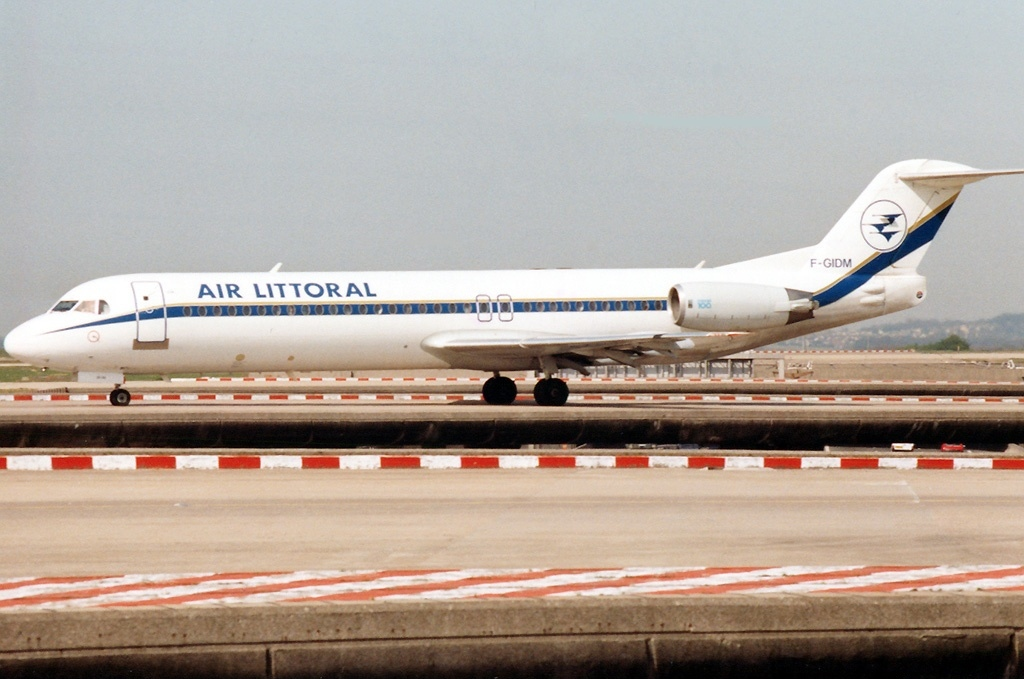
Fokker 100

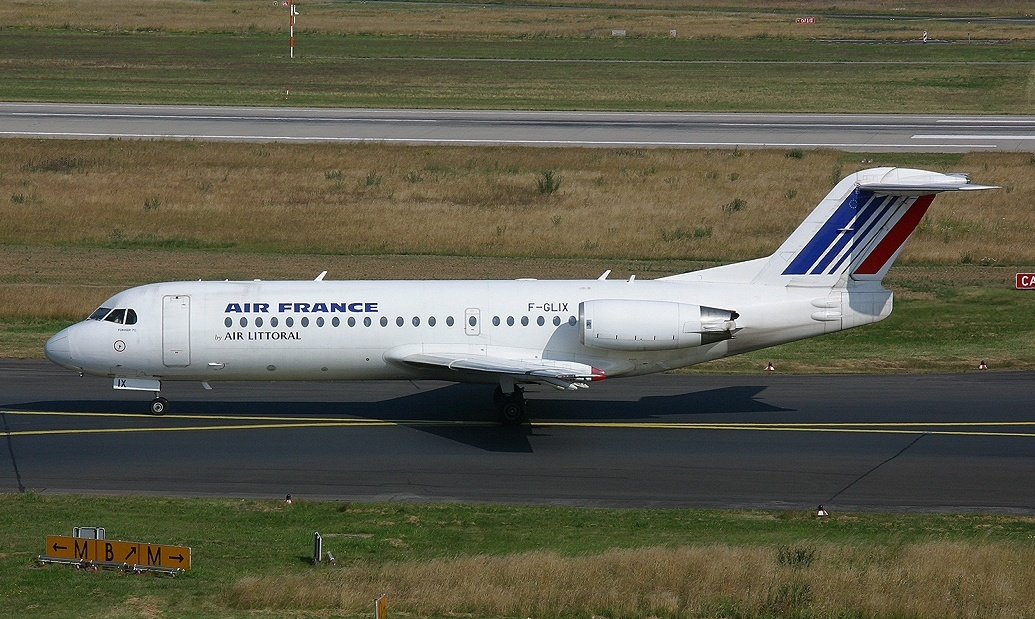
Fokker 70

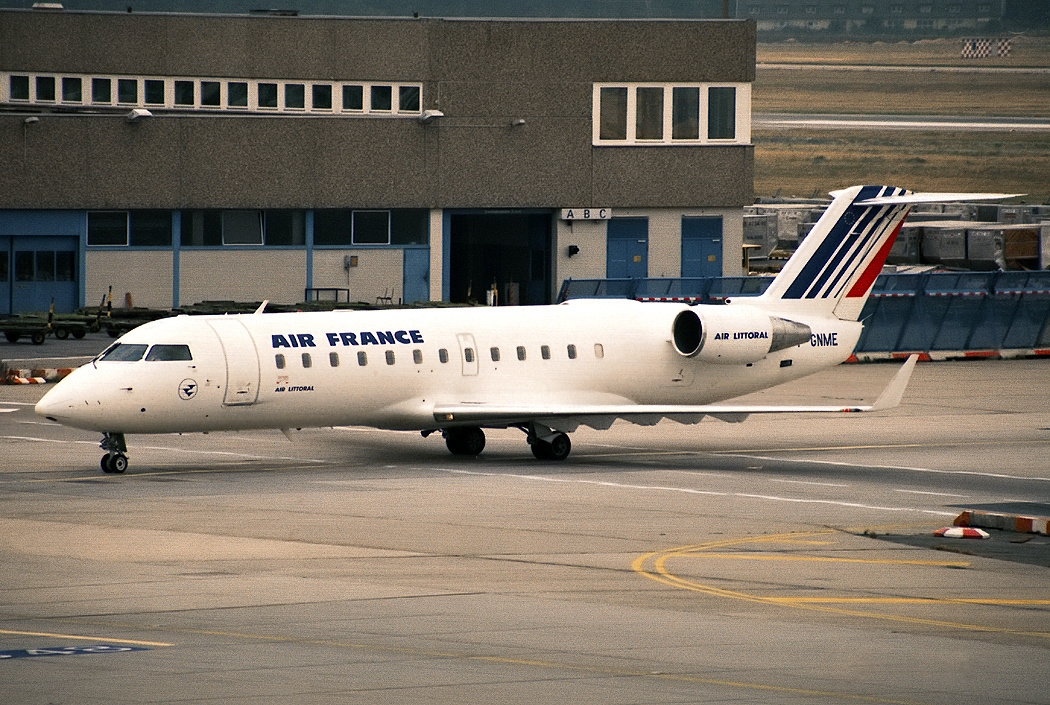
Bombardier CRJ-100

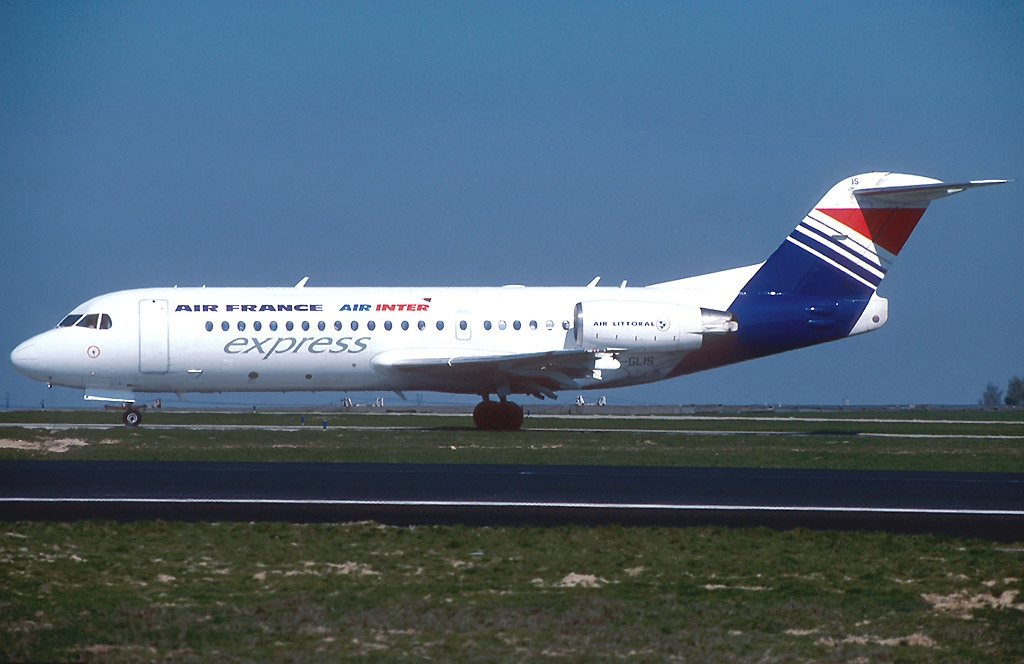
Fokker 70

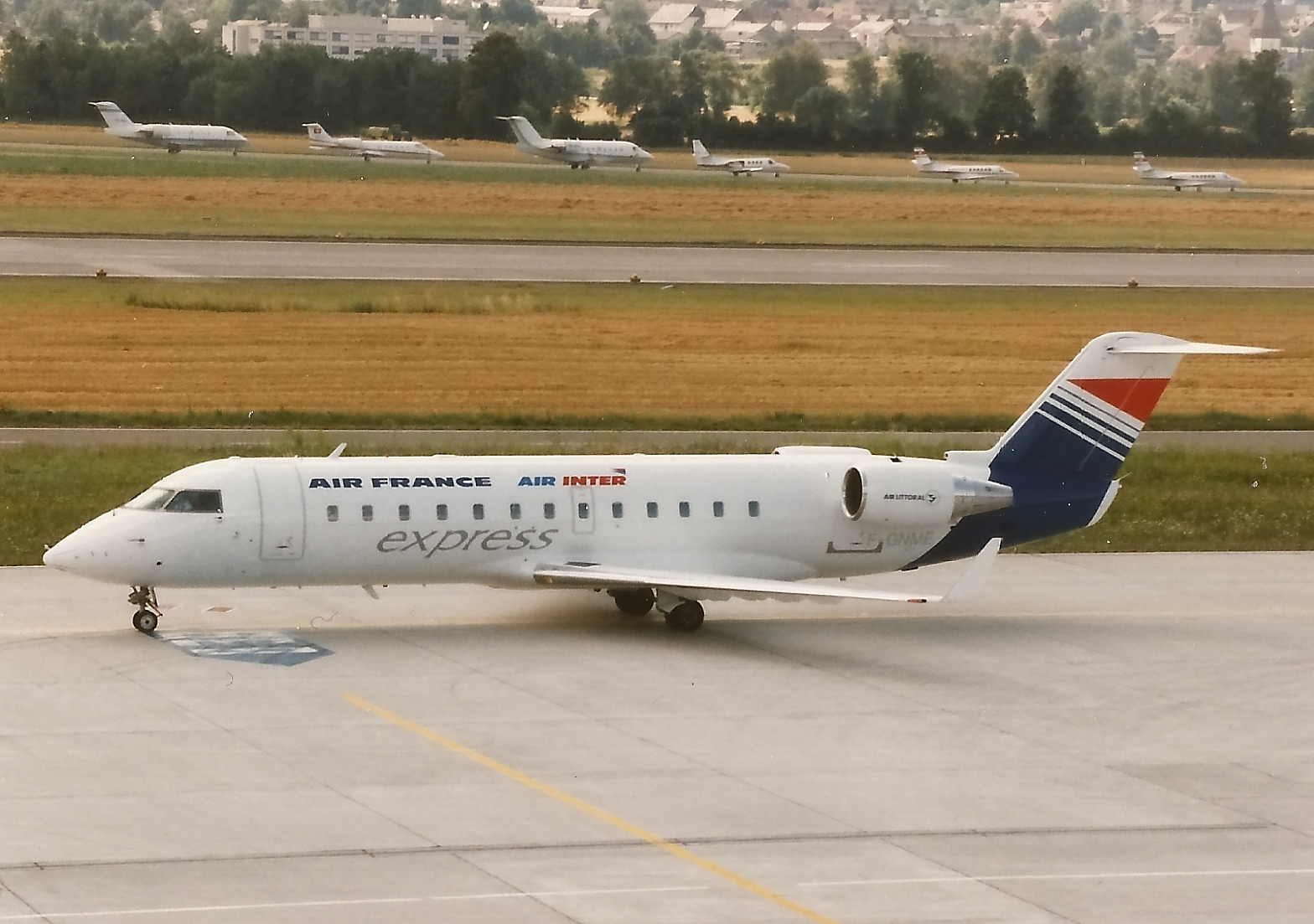
Bombardier CRJ

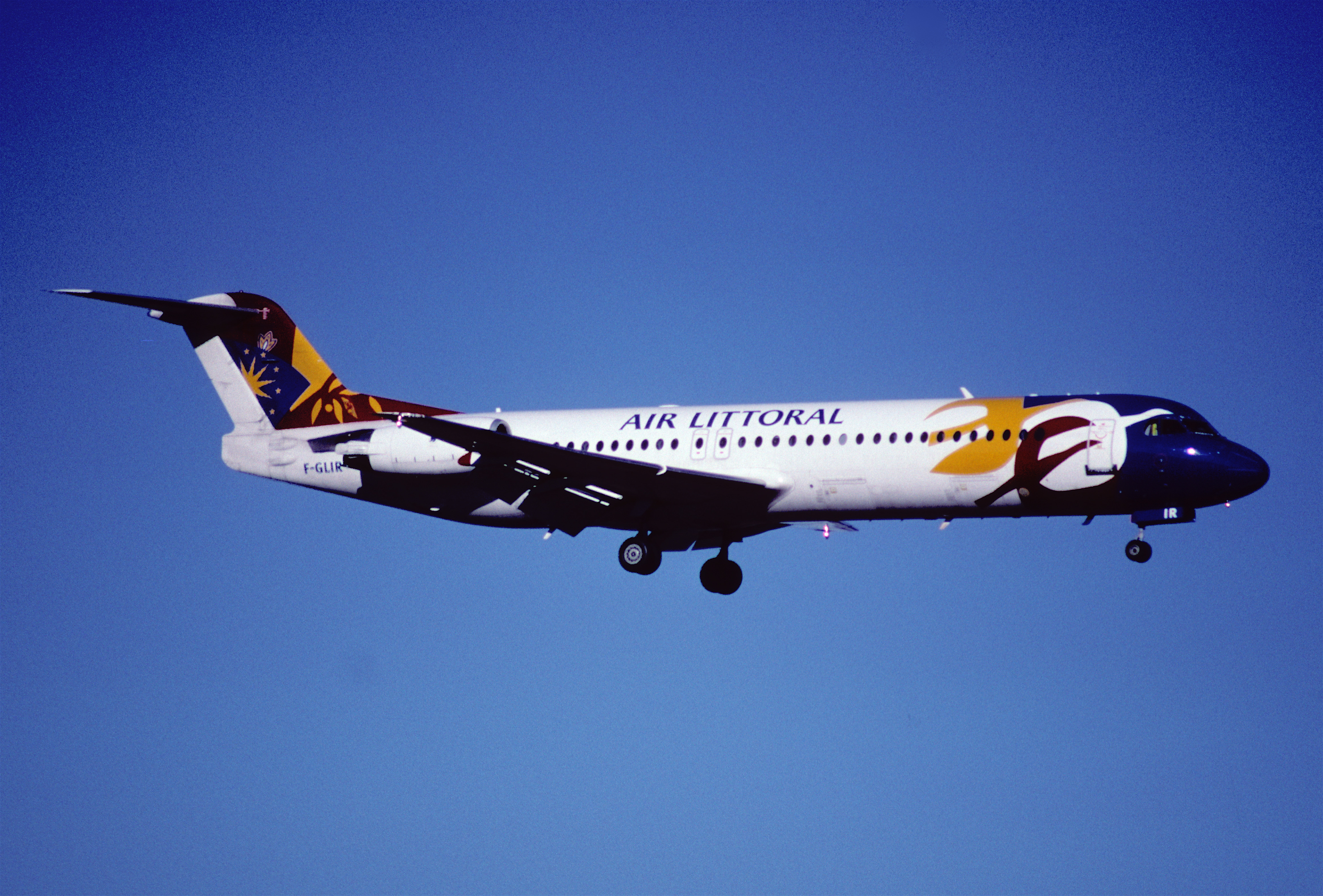
Fokker 100

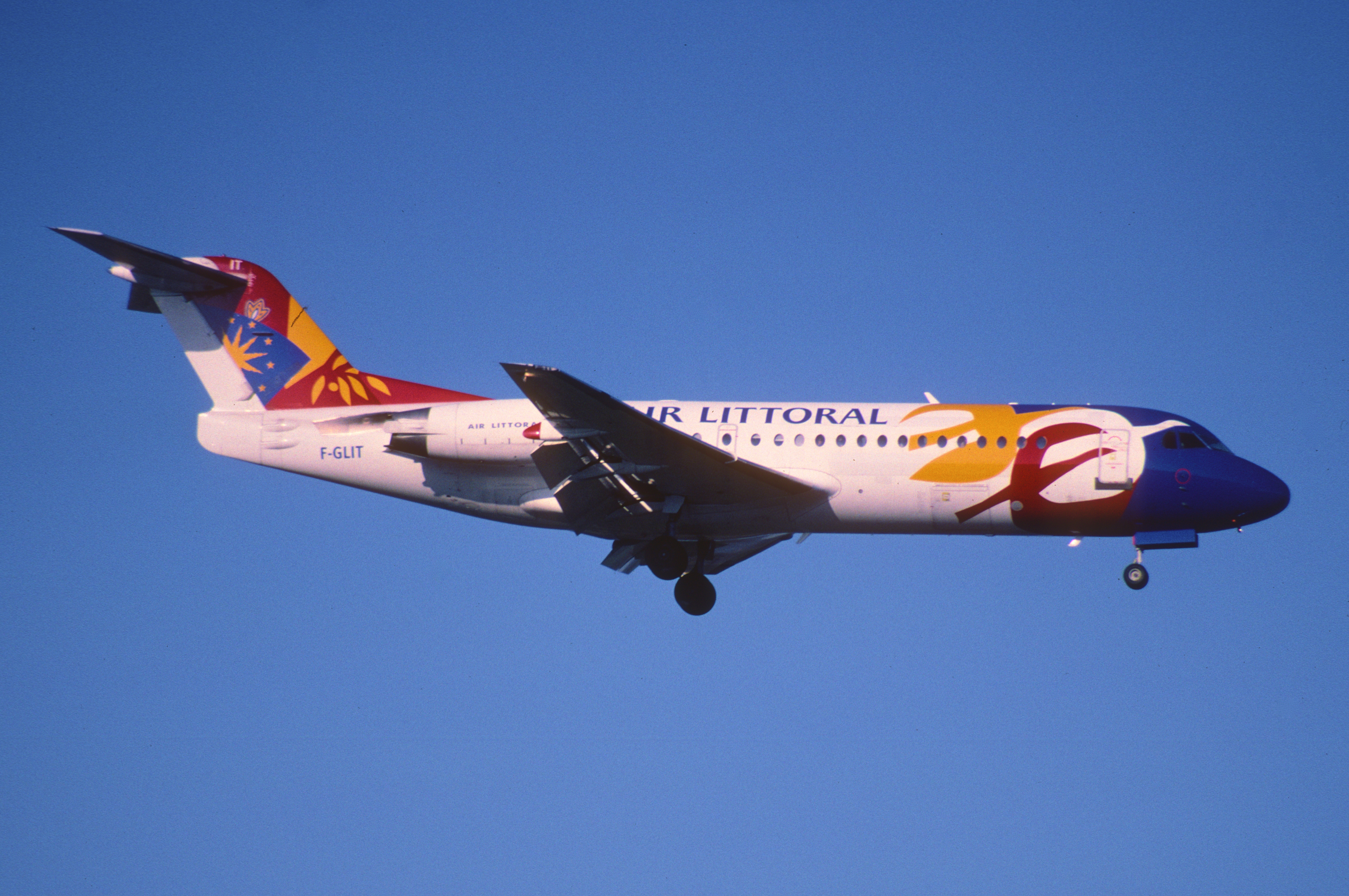
Fokker 70

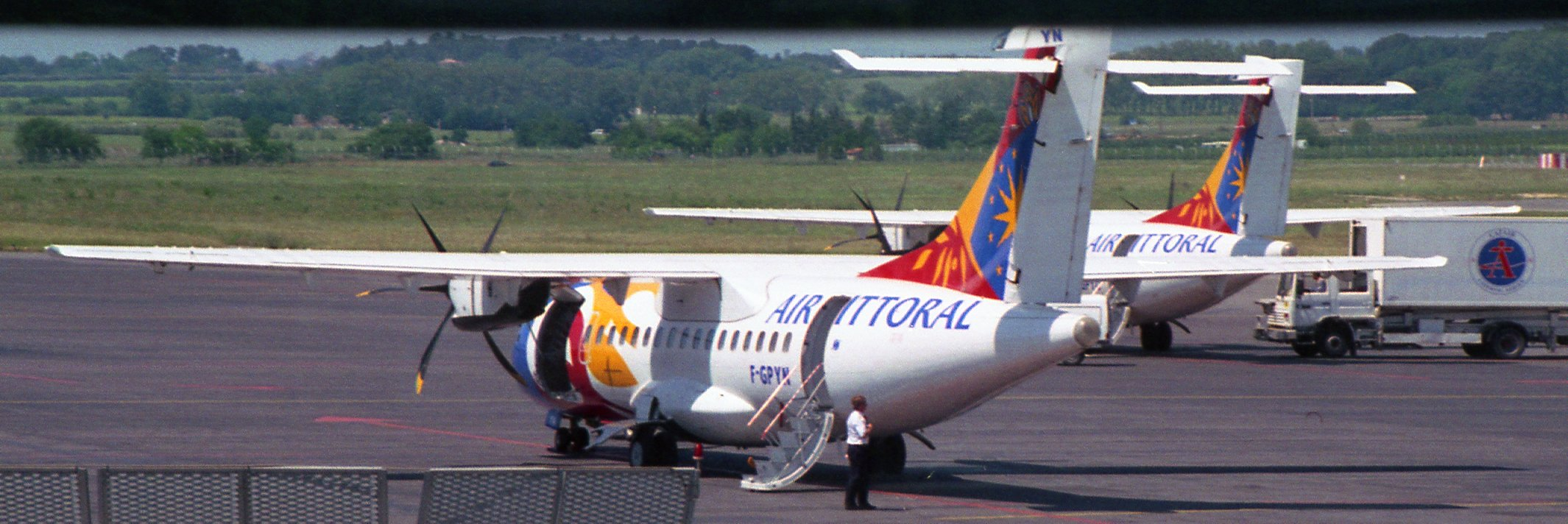
ATR 42 operated by Air Littoral Riviera

== Accidents ==
- 21 December 1987: Air Littoral Flight 1919, an Embraer EMB-120 Brasilia, operating a regular service from Brussels to Bordeaux, descended below the glideslope at Bordeaux–Mérignac Airport and crash-landed in the midst of trees in the vicinity of the airport, ultimately causing the deaths of all 16 aboard.
- 18 November 1988: Air Littoral Flight 440, a Swearing SA-226 metroliner, operating a regular service from Montluçon – Guéret Airport to Orly Airport, climbed to 2,000 feet before impacting the ground due to an uncommanded stick-shaker push set off by the stall warning unexpectly activating, resulting in all four passengers and crew to perish.

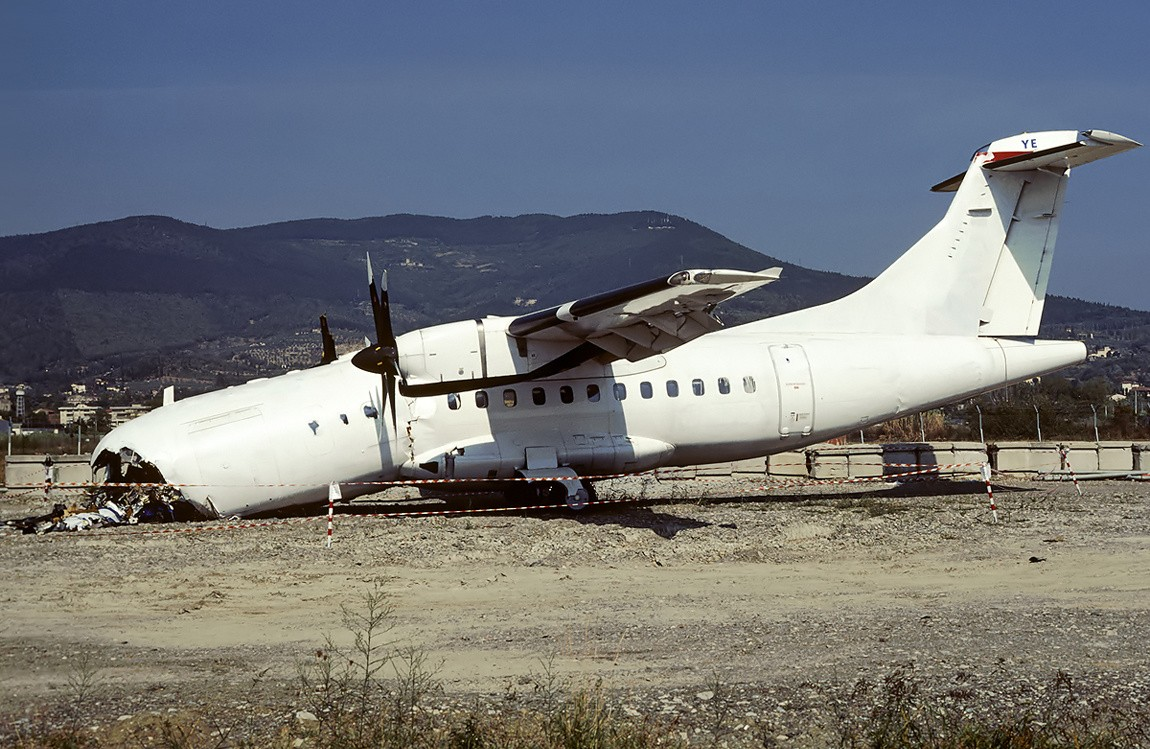

- 30 July 1997: Air Littoral Flight 701A, an ATR 42 on a service from Nice Côte d'Azur Airport to Florence, Italy, overran the runway on landing at Florence Airport, crashed through the perimeter fence and into a ditch next to the nearby A11 motorway. The captain died of his injuries four days later; fourteen other people on board were injured.
