= Flight 701 =

Flight 701 may refer to:

- Ariana Afghan Airlines Flight 701, crashed on 5 January 1969
- Air Littoral Flight 701, crashed on 30 July 1997
