= Dark (space company) =

French space security company

Dark was a space company from Paris, France, specialized in space security and protection, founded in 2021. Its activities focused on the development of an air-launched rocket named Interceptor, intending to capture space debris or spy satellites. Interceptor was planned to be launched from a plane in flight from anywhere on the planet and be capable of deploying payloads of up to 300 kilograms into LEO (low Earth orbit). As of April 2024 the company has raised over $11 million to develop its Interceptor platform. In 2023, it signed a partnership agreement with Bordeaux Airport. The first launch, from France, was planned for 2026.

On October 8, 2025, the company announced to cease its activities .
