= Wanda Warenine =

- Directed by: Riccardo Tolentino
- Written by: Alexander Pushkin (story)
- Starring: Joaquín Carrasco; Fabienne Fabrèges; Bonaventura Ibáñez
- Cinematography: Guido Silva
- Production company: Latina Ars
- Distributed by: Latina Ars
- Release date: July 1917
- Country: Italy
- Languages: Silent; Italian intertitles

Wanda Warenine is a 1917 Italian silent film directed by Riccardo Tolentino and starring Joaquín Carrasco, Fabienne Fabrèges and Bonaventura Ibáñez. It is based on a story by Alexander Pushkin.

== Cast ==
- Joaquín Carrasco
- Fabienne Fabrèges as Wanda Warenine
- Bonaventura Ibáñez
- Domenico Serra

== Bibliography ==
- Goble, Alan. The Complete Index to Literary Sources in Film. Walter de Gruyter, 1999.
