= Cimitero di Trespiano =

Cemetery in Florence, Italy

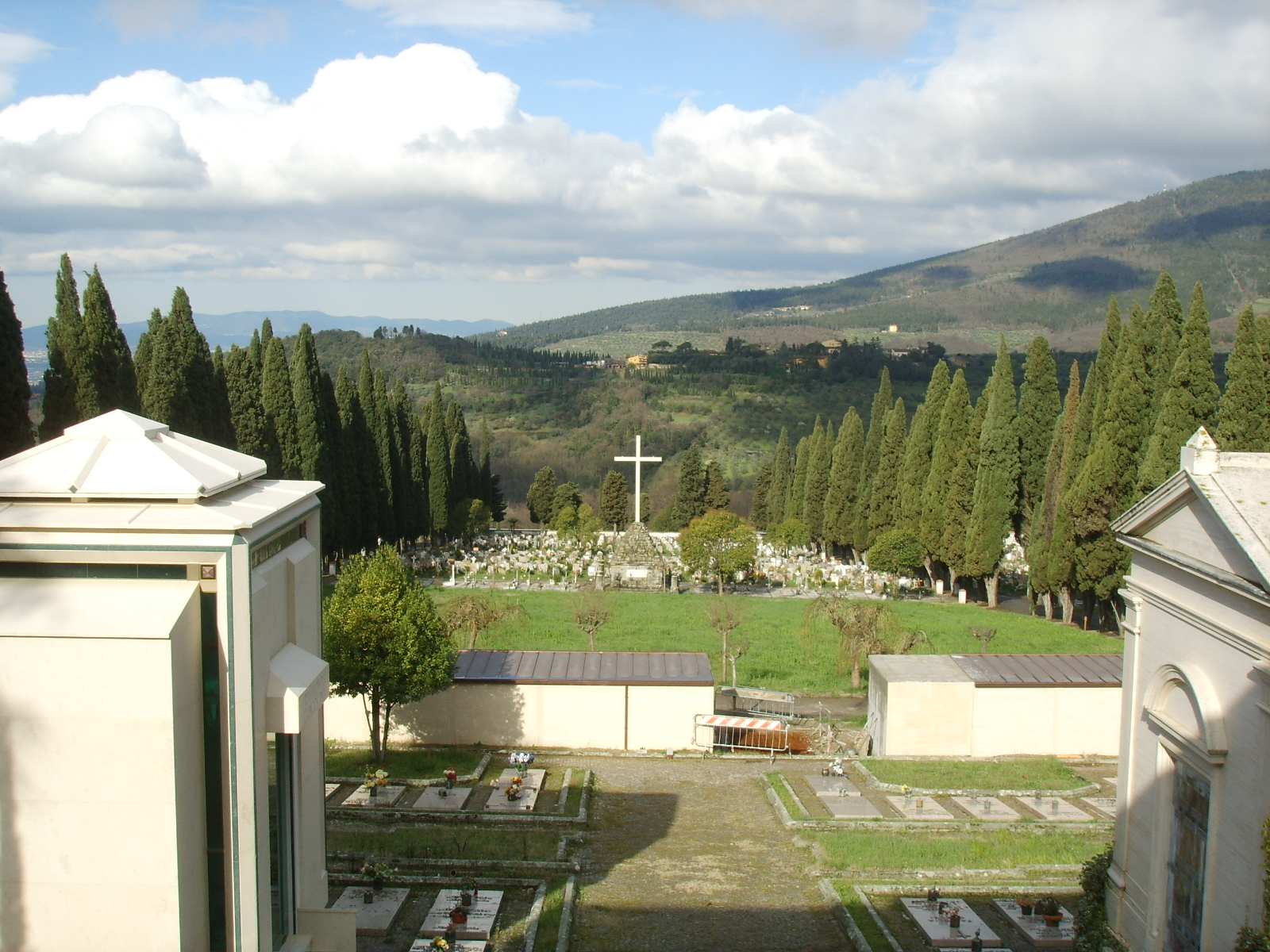
- Interactive map of Cimitero di Trespiano

Details
- Established: 1784
- Location: Florence
- Country: Italy
- Coordinates: 43.829°N 11.285°E
- Size: 54,000 m^{2} (13 acres)

The Cimitero di Trespiano ("Trespiano Cemetery") is a cemetery along the Via Bolognese near Florence, Italy, named after the hamlet of Trespiano in the hills north of Fiesole.

== History ==
It was inaugurated on 1 May 1784 following the reforms of Lorena that banned the burial of a deceased in the church. The monumental cemetery, later expanded into the terrain of the ridge of the Terzollina stream, incorporated the Pilastro villa, in the 15th century belonged to the Davanzelli and then passed on to the Tassinari in 1786, and the villa the Almonds, already belonged to the Dominican fathers of San Marco. In 1881 the cemetery covered 18,000 m ^{2}, while in 1906 it had already tripled and in 1931 it came to measure 54,000 m ^{2}.

The care of the cemetery was entrusted to the secular fathers and from 1850 to 1890 passed to the Cappuccino fathers; It was then directed by an inspector.

Modern access is marked by a row of cypresses marking the monumental architecture of the place of silence, designed by architect Umberto Fabbrini. The grandeur of the valley that opens in front of the panoramic scenery of Mount Morello is so solemn that it deserves the definition of "Florence Valley of Josaphat".

The Bracco Chapel was built by Giovanni Michelucci between 1969 and 1970.

== Buried personalities ==
In the cemetery of Trespiano are buried the remains of the Carlo and Nello Rosselli, Giuseppe Poggi, Pietro Chesi, Mario Fabiani, Lando Conti, Piero Bargellini, Gaetano Pieraccini, Ernesto Rossi, Gaetano Salvemini, Piero Calamandrei, Spartaco Lavagnini, Aldobrando de 'Medici Tornaquinci, Ettore Nava, Luigi Dallapiccola, Ugo Schiff, Paola Pezzaglia, Carlo Betocchi, Rosa Balistreri, Luigi Michelet, Gillian Brilli Peri, Clement Biondetti, Roberto Assagioli, Mason Remey, and Giaele Covelli.

In Trespiano Florentine cemetery the ashes of Dora d'Istria, aka the Princess Helena Koltsova-Massalskaya, born Elena Gjika are still kept today.

== Notes ==
- Foresto Niccolai (edited by), The urns of the strong, monuments and sepulchral inscriptions, Coppini Tipografi, Florence, September 1997
