= Giovanni Berta =

Italian fascist militant

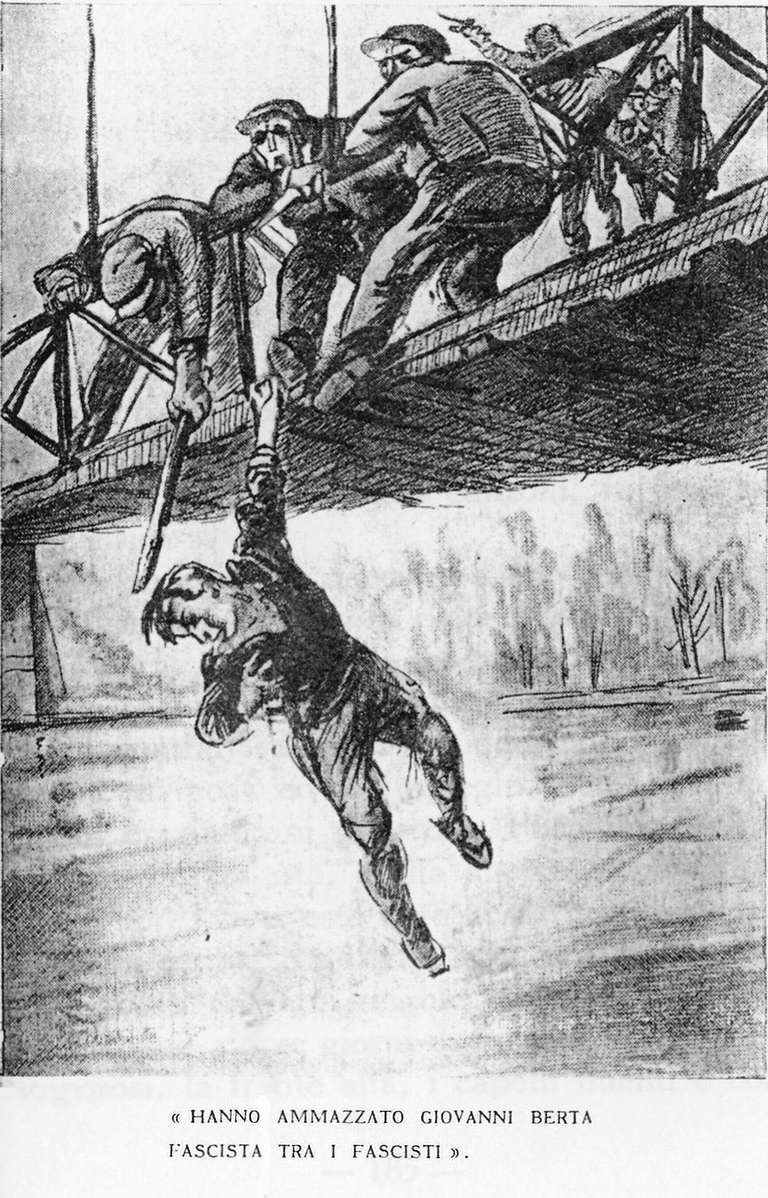
Murder of Giovanni Berta. Postcard realized by the Florentine squadristi in memory of Giovanni Berta

Giovanni Berta (August 24, 1894 – February 28, 1921) was an Italian fascist militant of the Florentine Squadrismo, later killed by communist militants during the Pignone clashes in Florence.

== Biography ==
Giovanni Francesco Berta, known as Gianni, was the son of a small Florentine metallurgical industrialist, Giuseppe, owner of the Fonderia delle Cure. He participated in the Italian-Turkish war in 1911 and in World War I, he was also part of the Fasci Italiani di Combattimento.

On February 28, 1921, one day after the anarchist attack at the Palazzo Antinori against a nationalist procession, which had caused the death of the student Carlo Menabuoni and the carabiniere Antonio Petrucci, and which had culminated then with the murder by the Squadrismo of the communist leader Spartaco Lavagnini, Berta was riding his bicycle on a bridge, where he was identified by a fascist pin that he wore on his jacket, then he was surrounded by members from the Italian Socialist Party and Communist Party of Italy and, after being stabbed, he was thrown across the parapet of the bridge into the Arno river, according to the version provided by Roberto Farinacci.

Giovanni Berta was buried at the Cimitero delle Porte Sante, in the family chapel, and is also still remembered among the "martyrs" in the Famedio di Santa Croce.

== Legacy ==
After his death, Berta was awarded the title of "Martyr of the Fascist Revolution" by the National Fascist Party. Commemorative postcards, songs, streets, and public buildings were dedicated to him. In addition, a Libyan town was named after him, currently known as Al Qubbah.

Stadio Artemio Franchi, when it was first constructed in early 1930s, was known as Stadio Giovanni Berta.
