= Cimitero delle Ballodole =

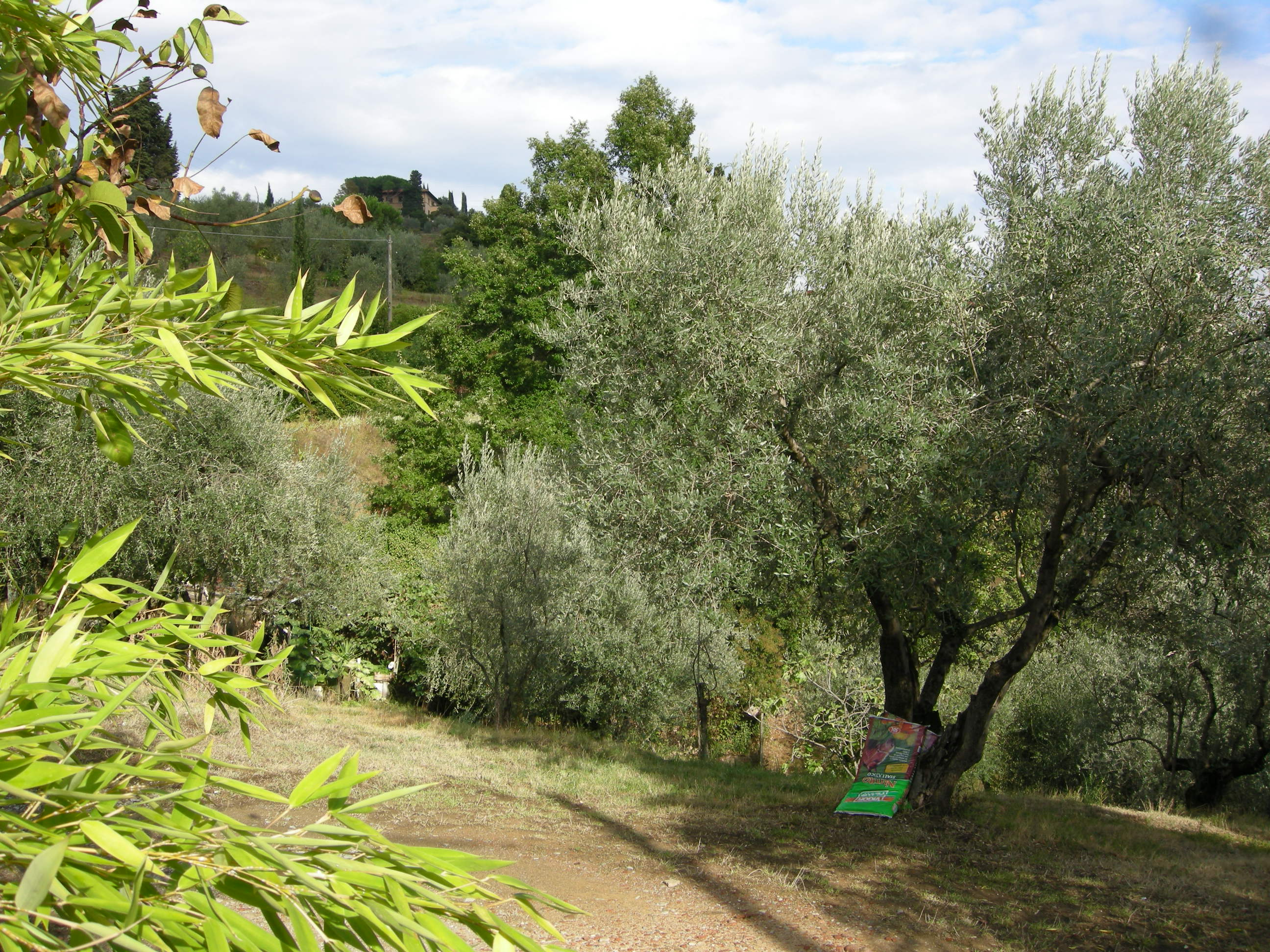
- Interactive map of Cimitero delle Ballodole

Details
- Location: Florence
- Country: Italy
- Type: Civil

Cimitero delle Ballodole (The Cemetery of the Ballodole) is a cemetery located in Florence, about a mile south of the current Cimitero di Trespiano. The Ballodole was the first cemetery created in Florence for the burial of ordinary people outside of churches. It was opened in 1775, anticipating the Napoleonic reforms. In 1783, following the law of the Tuscan government forbidding future interments in churches and regulating burial grounds, it was closed, moving the cemetery site to the new cemetery of Trespiano, which opened on 1 May 1784.
