= Carlo Betocchi =

Italian writer

Carlo Betocchi (23 January 1899 – 25 May 1986) was an Italian writer from Turin. Among the hermetic poets, he is considered a moral guide. However, unlike them, he based his poems on direct language, realism and moral tension.

Betocchi has been compared to Giovanni Pascoli, Umberto Saba, the crepusculars, and Clemente Rebora. However, his path was original among twentieth century poets.

== Biography ==
Carlo Betocchi was born in Turin on 23 January 1899. He moved to Florence in 1906 with his father, an employee of the Ferrovie dello Stato. After the death of his father in 1911, Betocchi and his brothers, Giuseppe and Anna, were educated by his mother, who focused especially on his spiritual education. He studied at the Florentine Technical Institute with his friend Piero Bargellini. Having obtained his diploma as a land surveyor in 1915, he attended the officers' school in Parma, but the Great War loomed. Between 1917 and 1918, he was sent to the front and took part in the first resistance on the Piave. In 1919, he volunteered in Libya, where he remained for a year.

Betocchi, in possession of his diploma, began to practice the profession of surveyor in the construction field. His work took him to France and various locations in central-northern Italy, having returned permanently to Florence in 1923 with Piero Bargellini, Nicola Lisi and the engraver Pietro Parigi. He collaborated on the magazine Calendar of solar thoughts and practices. In 1928, together with Bargellini, he founded the magazine Frontespizio and participated until 1938 in the development of the Catholic-inspired magazine. In 1934, he published his first poetic collection Reality conquers the dream (1932) in the magazine's column The most beautiful poetry.

In 1939, Betocchi left Florence and moved to Trieste where he was assigned the chair of literary subjects at the musical conservatory of Venice. He returned definitively to Florence in 1953 and taught with the same duties as he did at the Conservatory. He was an editor for the magazine L'Approdo letterario until December 1977 when the magazine closed down. In 1958, he was entrusted with the editorial office of the radio broadcast L'Approdo. Since 1932, there have been numerous poetic collections by Carlo Betocchi, including Realtà vince il sogno and Estate di San Martino in 1961, Uno passo, un altro passo in 1967, Prime e ultimissime in 1974, and Poesie del Sabato in 1980.

After World War II, Betocchi published News of prose and poetry (1947), A bridge over the plain (1953), and Poems (1955). He has a daughter named Silvia Betocchi. Carlo Betocchi died in Bordighera, Imperia, on 25 May 1986. Dal definitivo istante was released posthumously in 1999. He is buried in the Florentine cemetery of Trespiano.
