= Paola Pezzaglia =

Italian actress (1886–1925)

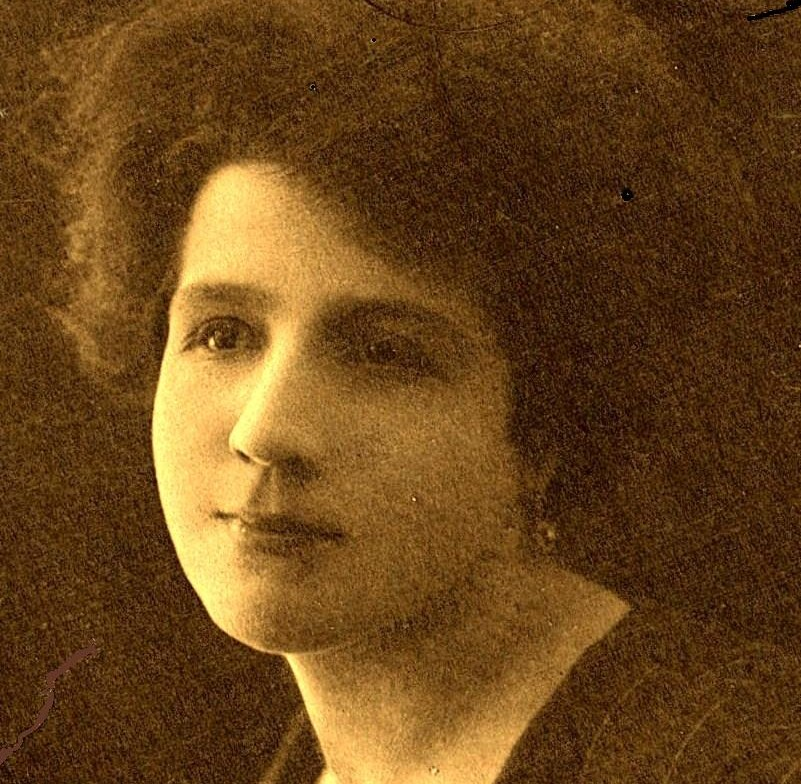
- Born: Paolina Pezzaglia; 13 September 1886; Milan, Kingdom of Italy
- Died: 17 December 1925 (aged 39); Florence, Kingdom of Italy
- Resting place: Trespiano Cemetery
- Occupation: Actress
- Years active: 1893–1925
- Spouse: Antonio Greco (m. 1908; died 1913)
- Children: 2

Paolina Pezzaglia Greco (13 September 1886 – 17 December 1925) was an Italian theatre and film actress.

== Early life ==
Pezzaglia was the only daughter of the VIP hair-stylist Gerolamo Pezzaglia (1854–1899) and Adelinda Monti (1854–1940). The family name was Pezzaglia, however, the variant spelling Pazzaglia is also found in some documents and sources.

Her uncle was the actor and "capocomico" Angelo Pezzaglia, who encouraged her to start acting on stage. At the age of 6 she already enchanted the public in theatre, and she grew to be a popular actress, acting in more than 120 theatrical pieces throughout Italy, Switzerland, Tunisia, Spain and Egypt.

== Career ==
She was first actress in Ermete Zacconi's "Compagnia", which was highly successful.

In 1914 Pezzaglia played the character of Sofia in the film Il fornaretto di Venezia, directed by Luigi Maggi. In 1918 she was cast as Biribì in the four-film serial movie Il mistero dei Montfleury. In 1918 she performed in La capanna dello zio Tom, directed by Riccardo Tolentino, and Le peripezie dell'emulo di Fortunello e compagni, directed by Cesare Zocchi Collani, playing the character of Madama Girasole.

She was a nonconformist artist, playing also male or grotesque characters.

In 1921 she was in the cast of La vendetta dello scemo, directed by Umberto Mucci.

== Death ==
Pezzaglia continued acting on stage till the end of her life, when, during a successful theatrical season, she died of pneumonia in Florence at the age of 39. She is buried at Trespiano Cemetery in Florence, Italy.

== Personal life ==
In 1908 she married the actor Antonio Greco and they had a son, Ruggero. Antonio died in 1913, at 29. In 1920 she had a daughter, Anna, with the actor and producer Luigi Mottura, who was 16 years younger. The two never married.

== In popular culture ==
The story of her life is told in the website "Archivio Pezzaglia-Greco" ("Pezzaglia-Greco Archive") by her grandson Gianni Greco, an Italian writer and radio-TV anchorman, with a lot of unpublished documents and photos. And in 2013 the Pezzaglia-Greco Archive was declared "of historical interest particularly important" by the Italian Ministry of Heritage and Culture and Tourism.

In Amber Tamblyn's book, Dark Sparkler (2015), Pezzaglia is mentioned in a poem.

== Filmography ==
- Il fornaretto di Venezia (1914)
- Muoio per lei! (1918)
- La capanna dello zio Tom (1918)
- Le peripezie dell'emulo di Fortunello e compagni (1918)
- L'emulo di Fortunello direttore d'orchestra (1918)
- Il mistero dei Montfleury (1918), serial movie in four full-length films:
- Il campo maledetto
- I bimbi di nessuno
- La sagra dei martiri
- Il giardino del silenzio
- La vendetta dello scemo (1921)
- Lo scemo Salvatore (1921)
