= Air Littoral Flight 1919 =

1987 aviation accident

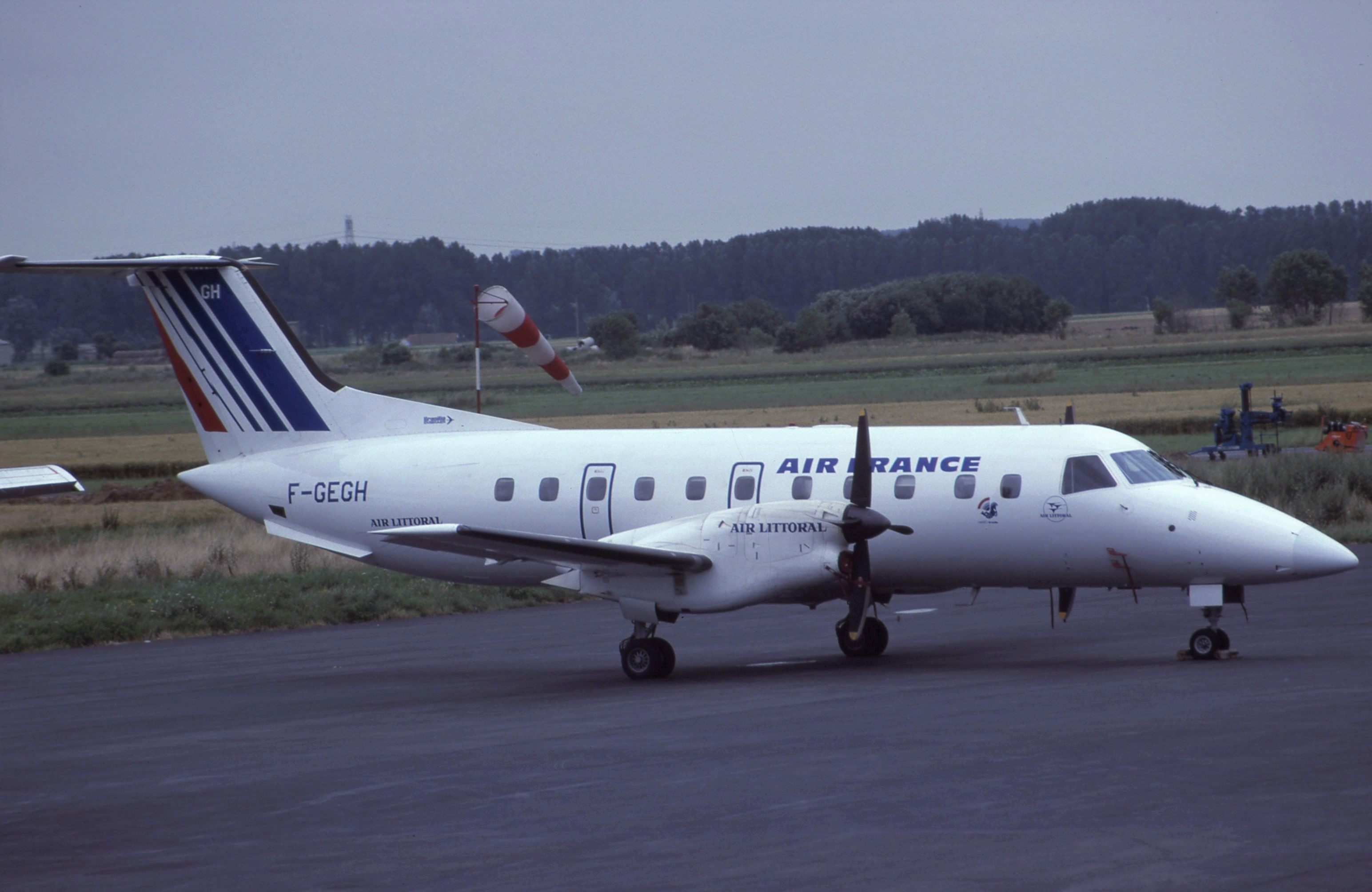
- F-GEGH, the aircraft involved in the accident, in July 1987

Accident
- Date: 21 December 1987
- Summary: Controlled flight into terrain due to pilot error
- Site: Near Eysines, 5km northeast of Bordeaux-Mérignac Airport, France

Aircraft
- Aircraft type: Embraer EMB 120
- Operator: Air Littoral, operating for Air France
- Registration: F-GEGH
- Flight origin: Brussels Airport, Belgium
- Destination: Bordeaux-Mérignac Airport, France
- Occupants: 16
- Passengers: 13
- Crew: 3
- Fatalities: 16
- Survivors: 0

Air Littoral Flight 1919 was a regional flight by Air Littoral for Air France from Brussels, Belgium to Bordeaux, France on 21 December 1987. During the flight, the Embraer 120 Brasilia crashed into a forest in the commune of Eysines, in the department of Gironde, during approach to Bordeaux-Mérignac Airport, resulting in the deaths of all 13 passengers and 3 crew members on board. Among the victims was Philippe Deschamps, the older brother of Didier Deschamps.

== Causes ==
A commission of inquiry was formed by decree on 22 December.

The accident was the direct consequence of poor trajectory management by the two pilots, who did not monitor their altitude during the approach phase in foggy weather, nor the ILS guidance towards the airport runway, descending below the minimum safe altitude until impact with the trees.

Investigators also noted, as a contributing factor to this accident, poor task coordination between the two pilots, neither of whom performed essential duties such as monitoring and reporting deviations from the ILS beam or altitude.

== Aircraft ==
The aircraft involved was an Embraer EMB 120RT Brasilia, registered as F-GEGH with serial number 120033. It was manufactured by Embraer in 1986 and was powered by two Pratt & Whitney Canada PW118 engines.
