= The Little Unknown =

1923 film

- Directed by: Guglielmo Zorzi
- Starring: Carmen Boni
- Release date: 1923
- Country: Italy
- Languages: Silent; Italian intertitles

The Little Unknown (Italian: La piccola ignota) is a 1923 Italian silent film directed by Guglielmo Zorzi and starring Carmen Boni.

== Cast ==
- Carmen Boni
- Camillo Apolloni
- Sandro D'Attino
- Fabienne Fabrèges
- Yvonne Fleuriel

== Bibliography ==
- Stewart, John. Italian film: a who's who. McFarland, 1994.
