= Riccardo Tolentino =

Italian actor and film director

- Born: Italy
- Occupations: Actor, Director
- Years active: 1914 - 1938 (film)

Riccardo Tolentino was an Italian actor and film director of the silent era. He directed the 1917 Pushkin adaptation Wanda Warenine. In 1918, the same year of J. Searle Dawley's Uncle Tom's Cabin, he directed the Italian version La capanna dello zio Tom, with Paola Pezzaglia.

== Selected filmography ==
=== Director ===
- Wanda Warenine (1917)
- La capanna dello zio Tom (1918)
- His Brother's Destiny (1919)

=== Actor ===
- Othello the Moor (1914)
- The Life of Giuseppe Verdi (1938)

== Bibliography ==
- Goble, Alan. The Complete Index to Literary Sources in Film. Walter de Gruyter, 1999.
