= Florence Airport =

Airport in Peretola, Italy

Florence Airport, Peretola Aeroporto di Firenze-Peretola

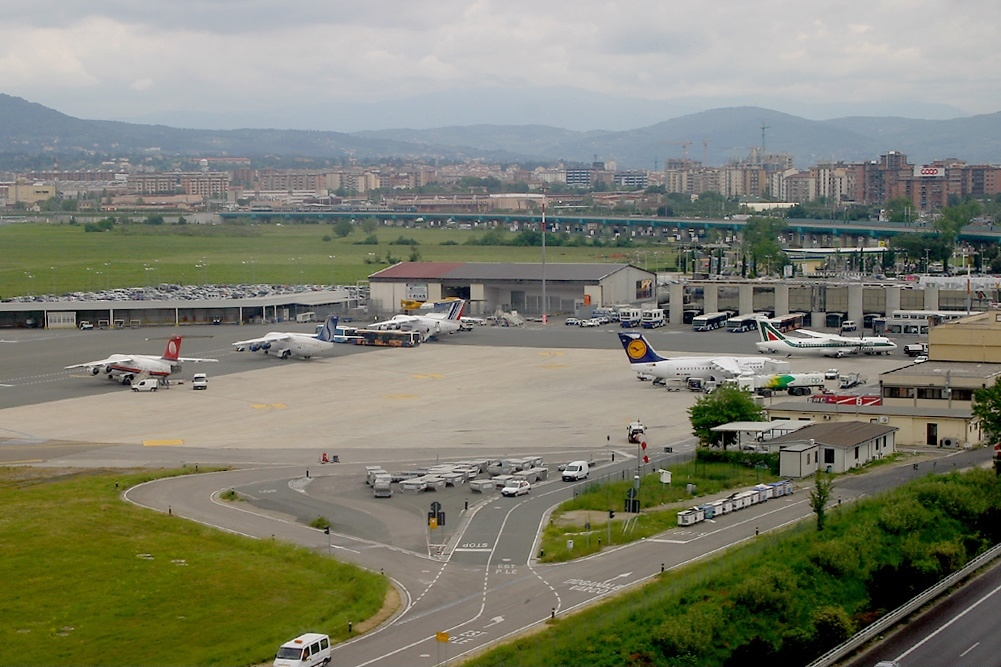
- IATA: FLR; ICAO: LIRQ

Summary
- Airport type: Public
- Owner/Operator: Toscana Aeroporti
- Serves: Florence, Italy
- Location: Peretola
- Opened: 4 June 1931; 95 years ago
- Focus city for: Volotea; Vueling
- Elevation AMSL: 43 m (141 ft)
- Coordinates: 43°48′36″N 11°12′14″E
- Website: www.aeroporto.firenze.it/en/

Map
- Location within Tuscany Location within Italy

Runways
Direction	Length		Surface
Direction	ft	m	Surface
05/23	5,118	1,560	Asphalt

Statistics (2025)
- Passengers: 3,847,658
- Passenger change 24-25: ▲ +9.4%
- Movements: 43,793
- Movements change 24-25: ▲ +8.4%
- Cargo (tons): 118.0
- Cargo change 24-25: ▲ +71.2%
- Source: Assaeroporti

Florence Airport, Peretola (IATA: FLR, ICAO: LIRQ), in Italian Aeroporto di Firenze-Peretola, formally Amerigo Vespucci Airport, is the international airport of Florence, the capital of the Italian region of Tuscany. It is the second-busiest Tuscan airport in terms of passengers after Pisa International Airport.

== History ==
=== Early years ===
The first air field in Florence was created in the Campo di Marte area in 1910, when military authorities allowed a field to be used for "experiments in air navigation". Campo di Marte thus became Florence's first airport, and remained so throughout the 1920s. However, the field was soon surrounded by houses and was inadequate for the new aircraft that were then replacing the first canvas-covered craft. In 1928, a location on the plain between Florence and Sesto Fiorentino was chosen. Peretola Airport opened there on 4 June 1931.

At first, Peretola was a large field where airplanes took off and landed with no formal direction, but eventually, the Ministry of Aeronautics decided to enlarge and upgrade it. The airport was extended toward Castello, and in 1938–39, an asphalt runway 60 metres (200 ft) wide and 1,000 metres (3,300 ft) long, facing northeast, was built.

During World War II, Peretola was used both by the Royal Italian Air Force and the Luftwaffe and from 1944 by Allied air forces. Then later in the 1940s it welcomed its first passenger flights, operated by Aerea Teseo with Douglas DC-3 aircraft. In 1948, Aerea Teseo went out of business. In the late '50s and early '60s, Alitalia, also using the DC-3, offered two routes: Rome–Florence–Venice and Rome–Florence–Milan. ATI then offered several domestic flights with the Fokker F27.

In the early 1980s, plans were made to upgrade the airport's facilities. In 1984, Saf (now AdF, the company that manages the airport) was founded, and restructuring work was completed: lengthening (to 1,400 m (4,600 ft)) and lighting the runway, installing a VOR/DME navigation system, and rebuilding the airport terminal. In September 1986, regular flights resumed. Since then, the number of airplanes and passengers has steadily increased.

=== Development since the 1990s ===
In 1990, the airport was renamed after Florence native Amerigo Vespucci, an Italian merchant and cartographer.

In 1992, the building now dedicated to arrivals, constructed by AdF, was inaugurated. Two years later, a departures building opened, and the City of Florence opened a car park at the entrance to the airport. In 1996, the runway was extended by 250 m (820 ft), and AdF funded further enlargement of the departure area. The new area has 15 check-in desks and is 1,200 square metres (13,000 ft^{2}) in area, 770 m^{2} (8,300 ft^{2}) of which are for public use.

Since 9 April 1998, AdF has had a global concession to managing the airport's infrastructure, and it has assumed responsibility for maintenance and development. In late 1999, a renovation and expansion of the terminals, aircraft parking areas, and other facilities began.

In July 2000, AdF made its debut on the stock market, and in 2001, the airport was among the first in Europe to obtain UNI EN ISO 9001/2000 certification for the quality of its services.

On 5 December 2012, Vueling announced the opening of a base of operations in Florence, with flights to several destinations in Europe.

== Facilities ==
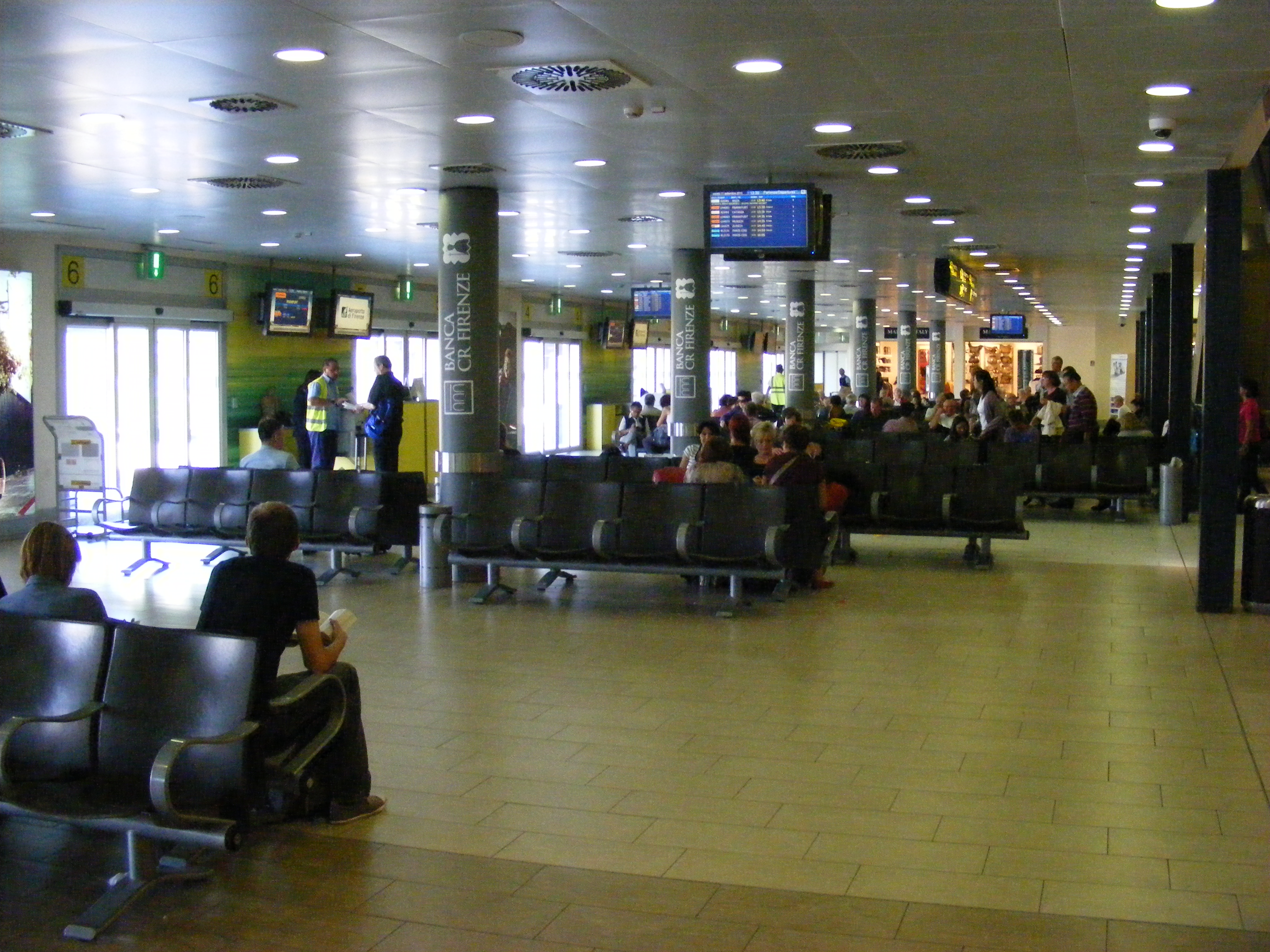
Departure area at Florence Airport

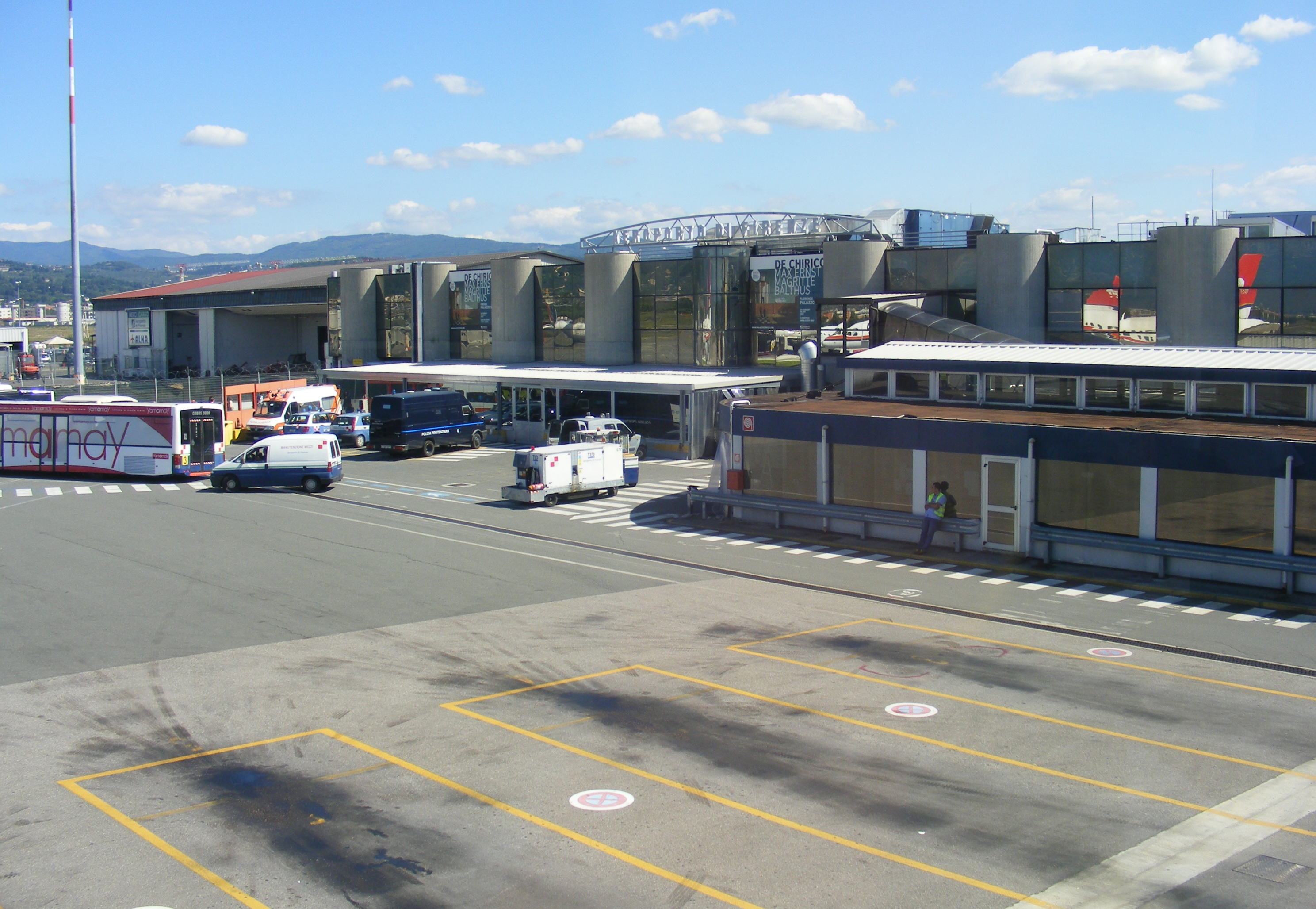
Apron view

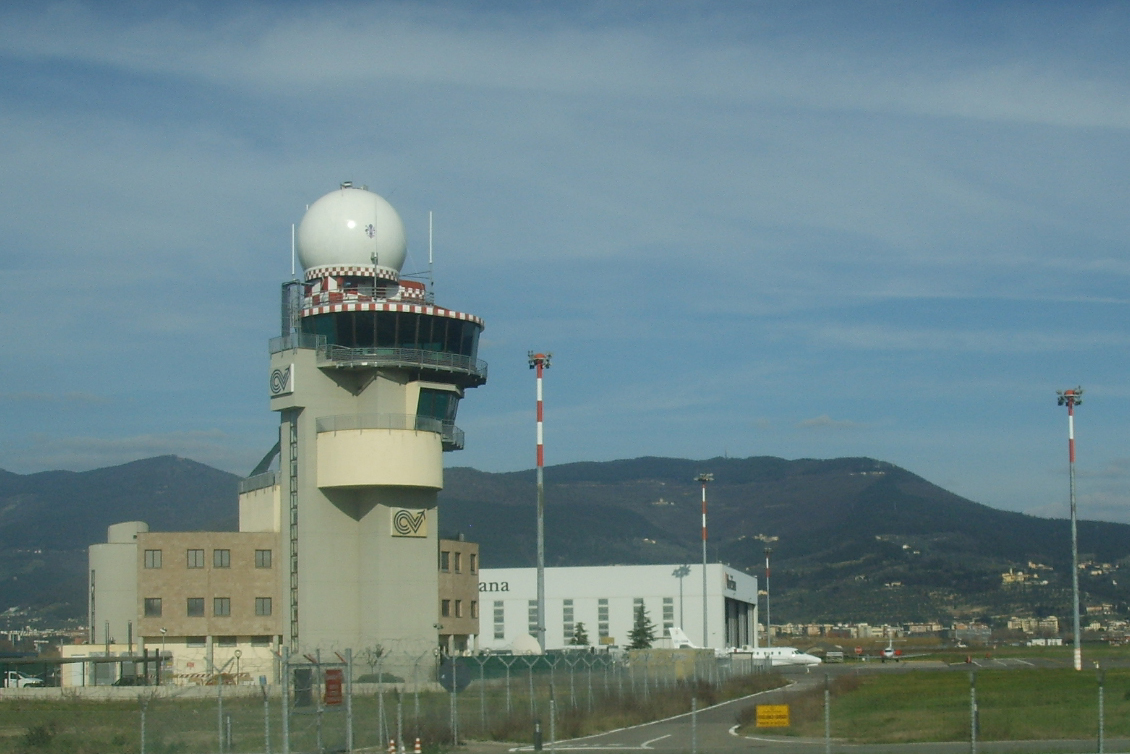
Control tower

Florence Airport has a single runway, and the main taxiway is situated at the end of Runway 5, with an overshoot/holding area at the end of Runway 23. As is common at smaller airports, after landing, planes turn around at the end of the runway, then taxi back down to reach the parking area and terminal. Because of the close proximity of Monte Morello, planes normally take off from Runway 23, thus forcing aircraft to taxi down the runway again to depart.

The Polizia di Stato stations police helicopters at the airport.

The terminal buildings are quite small. The larger brown building contains the check in, security, duty free and arrivals, as well at gate number 1. There is a second older building connected by an airbridge, which contains gates 2–11, as well as a food court. The current airport does not have any jetbridges so bus boarding is used from all gates, however, a new state of the art terminal is expected in the next decade, containing 7 new jetbridges. The short runway is due to be decommissioned and reduced to a taxiway because a new runway is set to be built perpendicular to the current one (parallel to the A11 highway). The new runway will be longer than the current one, which only can accept aircraft up to the size of the A320NEO.

== Airlines and destinations ==
The following airlines offers scheduled services from and to Florence Airport:

Airlines	Destinations
Aegean Airlines	Athens
Aeroitalia	Seasonal: Cagliari
Air Corsica	Nice
Air Dolomiti	Frankfurt, Munich
Air France	Paris–Charles de Gaulle
Air Serbia	Belgrade
Austrian Airlines	Vienna
British Airways	London–City, London–Heathrow, London–Stansted
Brussels Airlines	Seasonal: Brussels
Condor	Seasonal: Frankfurt (begins 6 May 2027)
Eurowings	Seasonal: Düsseldorf
Finnair	Seasonal: Helsinki
Iberia	Madrid
ITA Airways	Rome–Fiumicino
KLM	Amsterdam
Luxair	Seasonal: Luxembourg
Scandinavian Airlines	Seasonal: Copenhagen, Stockholm–Arlanda, Oslo
Small Fly Airlines	Elba
Swiss International Air Lines	Zürich
TAP Air Portugal	Lisbon
Volotea	Bordeaux, Cagliari, Catania, Nantes, Palermo, Prague, San Sebastián; Seasonal: Alghero, Asturias, Berlin, Bilbao, Hamburg, Lyon, Olbia, Seville, Strasbourg, Toulouse, Valencia
Vueling	Barcelona, Brussels, Catania, London–Gatwick, Madrid, Paris–Orly; Seasonal: Menorca
Widerøe	Seasonal: Bergen

== Ground transportation ==
The second line of the Florence light-rail network has a terminal at the airport. The airport is also connected with the city of Florence by a bus line that runs to and from the central railway station every half-hour, operated by Autolinee Toscane. Taxis are available to central Florence.

== Accidents and incidents ==
- 30 July 1997: Air Littoral Flight 701, an ATR 42 regional aircraft arriving from Nice, France, overran the runway on landing, crashed through the perimeter fence and into a ditch next to the nearby A11 motorway. The captain died of his injuries four days later; fourteen other people on board were injured.
