= Air Littoral Flight 701A =

1997 aviation accident

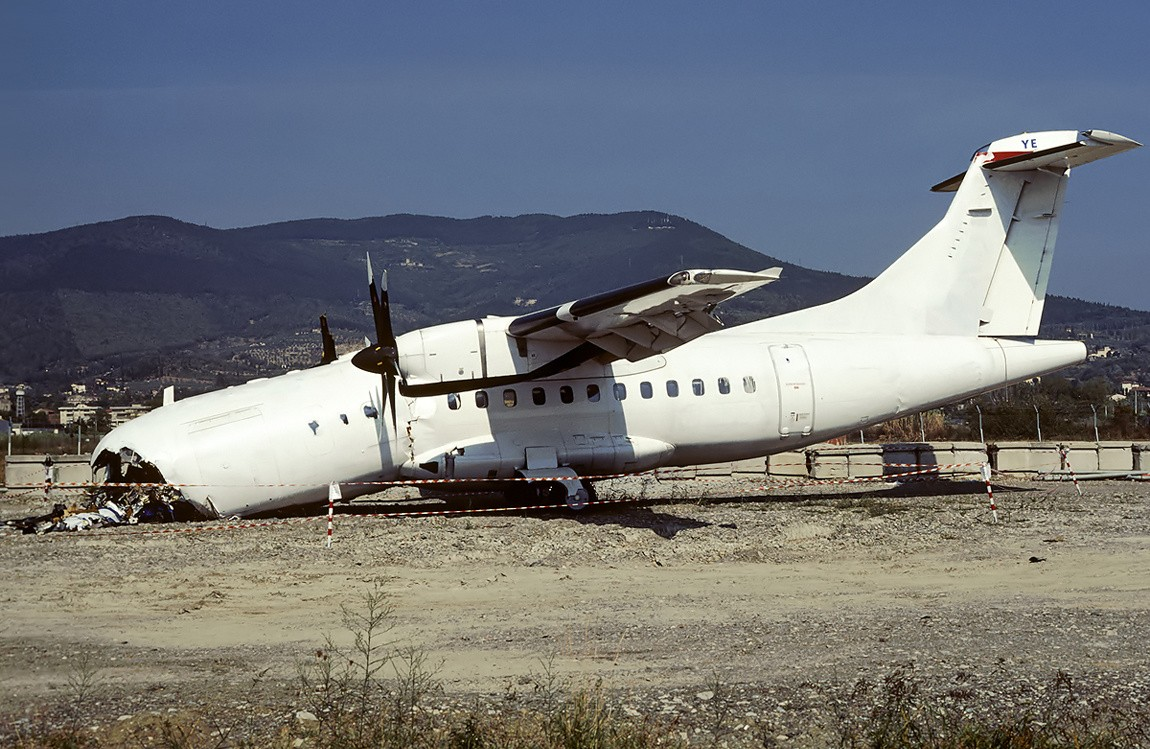
- The wreckage of F-GPYE

Accident
- Date: 30 July 1997
- Summary: Runway overrun
- Site: Past the end of runway 23, Florence airport, Florence, Italy; 43°48′15″N 11°11′45″E

Aircraft
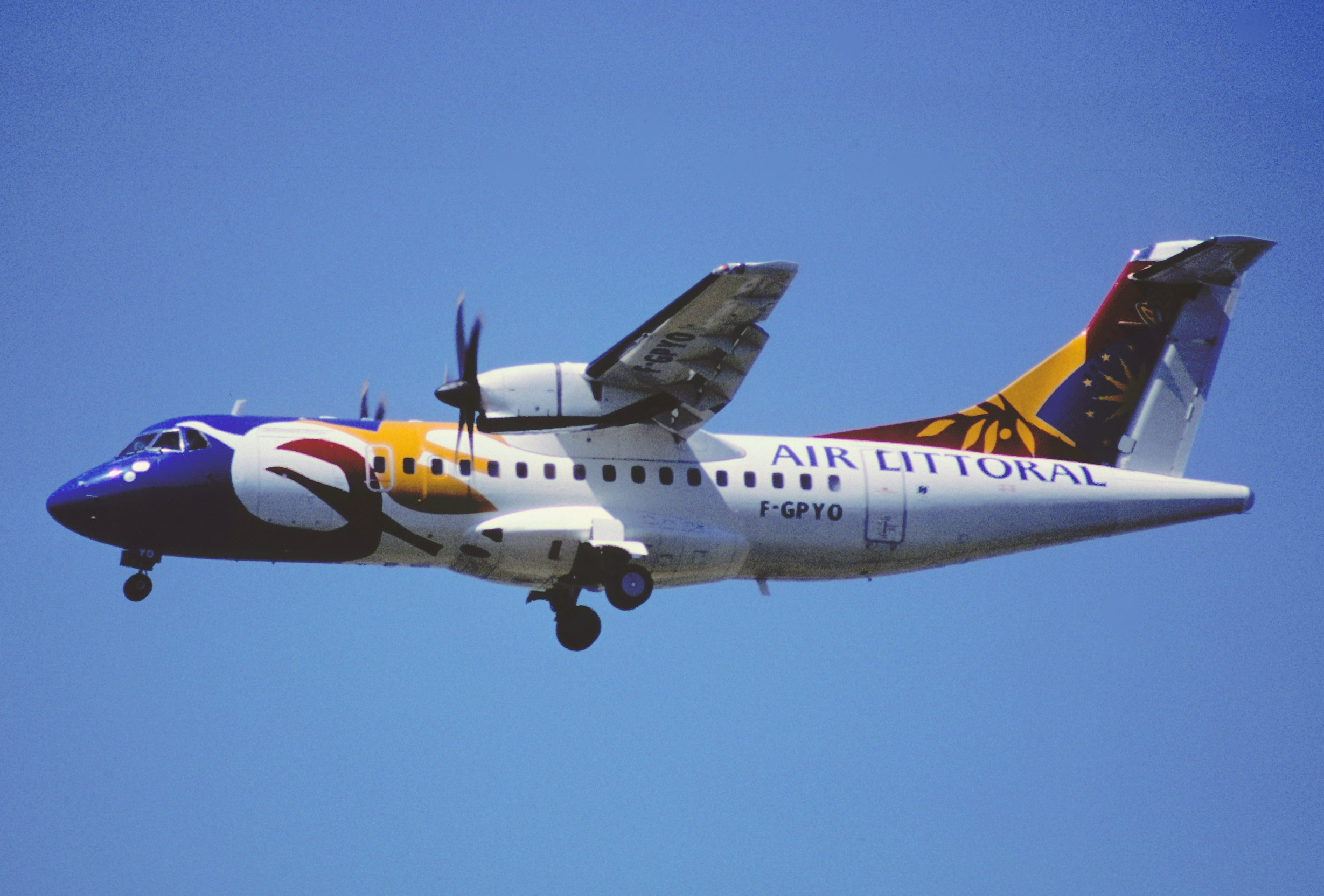
- An ATR 42 of Air Littoral similar to the aircraft involved.
- Aircraft type: ATR 42-500
- Operator: Air Littoral
- IATA flight No.: FU701A
- Registration: F-GPYE
- Flight origin: Nice Côte d'Azur Airport, Nice, France
- Destination: Florence Airport, Florence, Italy
- Occupants: 17
- Passengers: 14
- Crew: 3
- Fatalities: 1
- Injuries: 16
- Survivors: 16

On 30 July 1997, Air Littoral Flight 701A, an ATR 42 regional turboprop operating a scheduled passenger flight from Nice, France to Florence, Italy, crashed on landing when it ran off Florence Airport's runway and into a ditch next to a motorway embankment. There were no fatalities among the 14 passengers on board, but the cockpit section was severely damaged, and the captain died of his injuries four days later.

== Accident ==
At around 10:30 on the day of the accident, following an uneventful flight from Nice, the aircraft prepared to land at Florence's Peretola airport, where the weather was reported as CAVOK, that is good visibility and no cloud; the wind was light and variable. The crew elected to land on runway 23, which has a 620-metre (2,030 ft) displaced threshold. Such choice was described as unusual, in the given conditions; eighty percent of the aircraft operating on the airport that day had landed on the opposite runway, runway 05.

At 10:36 the aircraft was observed touching down far into the runway and at a much higher speed than usual. It then overran the runway end, crashed through the airport perimeter fence and into a ditch next to the nearby A11 motorway. The right engine stopped when the propeller contacted the ground, but the left engine kept running for the following 45 minutes, while rescue operations were taking place.

All passengers were rapidly evacuated, but due to the damage to the cockpit section, it took about an hour to extricate the two crew members. The instructor captain was hospitalized but succumbed to his injures four days later; the captain undergoing training and 13 other passengers were injured.

== Aircraft and crew ==
The aircraft was an ATR 42-500 twin turboprop, with French registration F-GPYE, powered by two Pratt & Whitney Canada PW127 engines. Air Littoral, the launch customer for the model, took delivery of the aircraft the year before, in 1996.

The pilot flying seated in the left-hand seat was Captain Alain Blayes, he was undergoing line training with the supervision of Instructor Captain Remy Cuculiere, seated in the right-hand seat as the pilot monitoring.

== Investigation and trial ==
At the time, the Italian air accident investigation agency, the Agenzia Nazionale per la Sicurezza del Volo, had not been established yet, therefore the matter was referred to the Italian Civil Aviation Authority and to the public prosecutor.

The prosecutor determined that the final approach was conducted at an excessive speed and rate of descent, even triggering the associated on-board warning system, which was ignored. No technical defects were found in the aircraft.

Captain Blayes and two managers from Air Littoral – the head of training and the head of human resources – were charged with manslaughter and causing an air disaster but were acquitted in November 2003. The responsibility for the crash was ultimately placed on the instructor captain, and his "imprudent" decision to proceed with the landing despite the unsafe approach.

== Legacy ==
The accident highlighted the limitations of Florence's Peretola airport, which is geographically constrained between the A11 motorway and 930-metre-high (3,050 ft) Mount Morello. The event was cited during the following years as argument against proposals to further develop the airport, with opponents recommending expanding nearby Pisa Airport instead.

== See also ==
- List of accidents and incidents involving commercial aircraft
