= Fabienne Fabrèges =

French actress

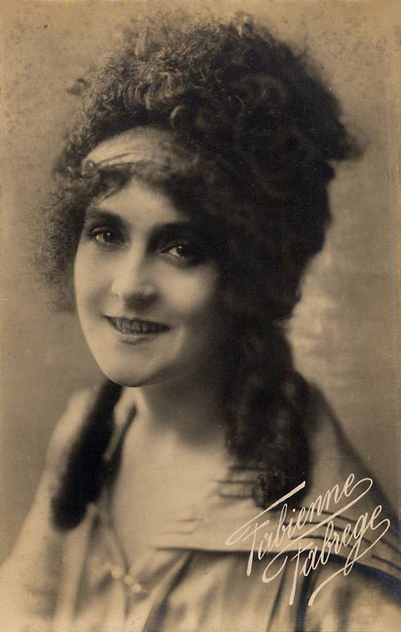
- Fabrèges in 1917
- Born: 1889; Paris, France
- Occupation: Actress
- Years active: 1909–1923 (film)

Fabienne Fabrèges was a French film actress of the silent era. She appeared in more than sixty films.

== Selected filmography ==
- Wanda Warenine (1917)
- The Penniless Millionaire (1921)
- The Little Unknown (1923)

== Bibliography ==
- Abel, Richard. The Ciné Goes to Town: French Cinema, 1896-1914. University of California Press, 1998.
