= Kini Carrasco =

Joaquín "Kini" Carrasco Ávila (born 16 January 1965) is a Spanish politician and former parathlete.

Carrasco played basketball for Cáceres CB until he lost his left arm in a traffic accident in 1985. He then took up para-athletics and competed in the 100 metres at the Summer Paralympic Games in 1988, 1992 and 2000. He then switched to long-distance running, including the paratriathlon that was introduced in 2009. In 2023, he became the first competitor in 100 international paratriathlons, and he retired in 2024.

Carrasco was elected to the Assembly of Extremadura in the 2025 regional election, as second place on the People's Party (PP) list in the Cáceres constituency.

== Sporting career ==
Carrasco was born in Cáceres in Extremadura. He played basketball for Cáceres CB, making the first team by age 16 and playing in the second division. On 30 January 1985, he was riding a dirt bike to Malpartida de Cáceres to go fishing, when he was hit by an overtaking car, losing his left arm instantly. A nurse was driving by and made a tourniquet from Carrasco's coat before driving him to hospital, fully conscious. The wound on his stump was left open for five days to clean debris. On 14 February, he was discharged.

Carrasco was encouraged by disability organisations to continue playing basketball, but instead chose to dedicate himself to para-athletics. He practiced the 100 metres and qualified for the 1988 Summer Paralympics in Seoul and the 1992 Summer Paralympics in Barcelona; he described the latter as a watershed for disability sport in his country. He missed the 1996 Summer Paralympics in Atlanta due to what he described as an administrative decision, but competed at the 2000 Summer Paralympics in Sydney. At the last of these tournaments, he took part in the 4 × 100 metres relay and finished fourth, his best Olympic performance.

Following the 2000 Paralympics, Carrasco switched to long-distance running and achieved a marathon time of 3 hours and 28 minutes. In 2009, the paratriathlon was introduced. During the COVID-19 pandemic in Spain, he was eligible as an elite athlete to train outside during lockdown, but was insulted for doing so. In October 2023, aged 58, he became the first paratriathlete to contest 100 international events. He came 7th at his 100th event, the World Cup in Málaga.

Carrasco was chosen for the 2024 Summer Paralympics as a coach, rather than an athlete. He said that the decision was politically motivated in order to allow a refugee to compete instead, and alleged that this athlete had rarely previously competed and had a poor personality. Carrasco retired in September 2024, having finished runner-up at the Spanish championship in Valencia.

== Political career ==
After the President of the Regional Government of Extremadura, María Guardiola, called a snap election for December 2025, she named Carrasco as number two behind her on the People's Party (PP) list for the Cáceres constituency. During the campaign, he denounced a stranger who called him a "fucking cripple who has sold his values to a political party just for money"; he was supported by Alberto Durán, president of the Spanish Paralympic Committee. He was elected as his party formed the largest group in the Assembly of Extremadura with 29 members.

== Recognition ==
In October 2017, mayor Elena Nevado named Carrasco as a Favourite Son of Cáceres, calling him "an example of overcoming, knowing how to defeat adversity and never giving up".

Carrasco was awarded the Medal of Extremadura in 2021, calling it "the most important medal that I could get".
