= Bordeaux–Mérignac Airport =

Airport serving Bordeaux, France

Bordeaux–Mérignac Airport Aéroport de Bordeaux-Mérignac

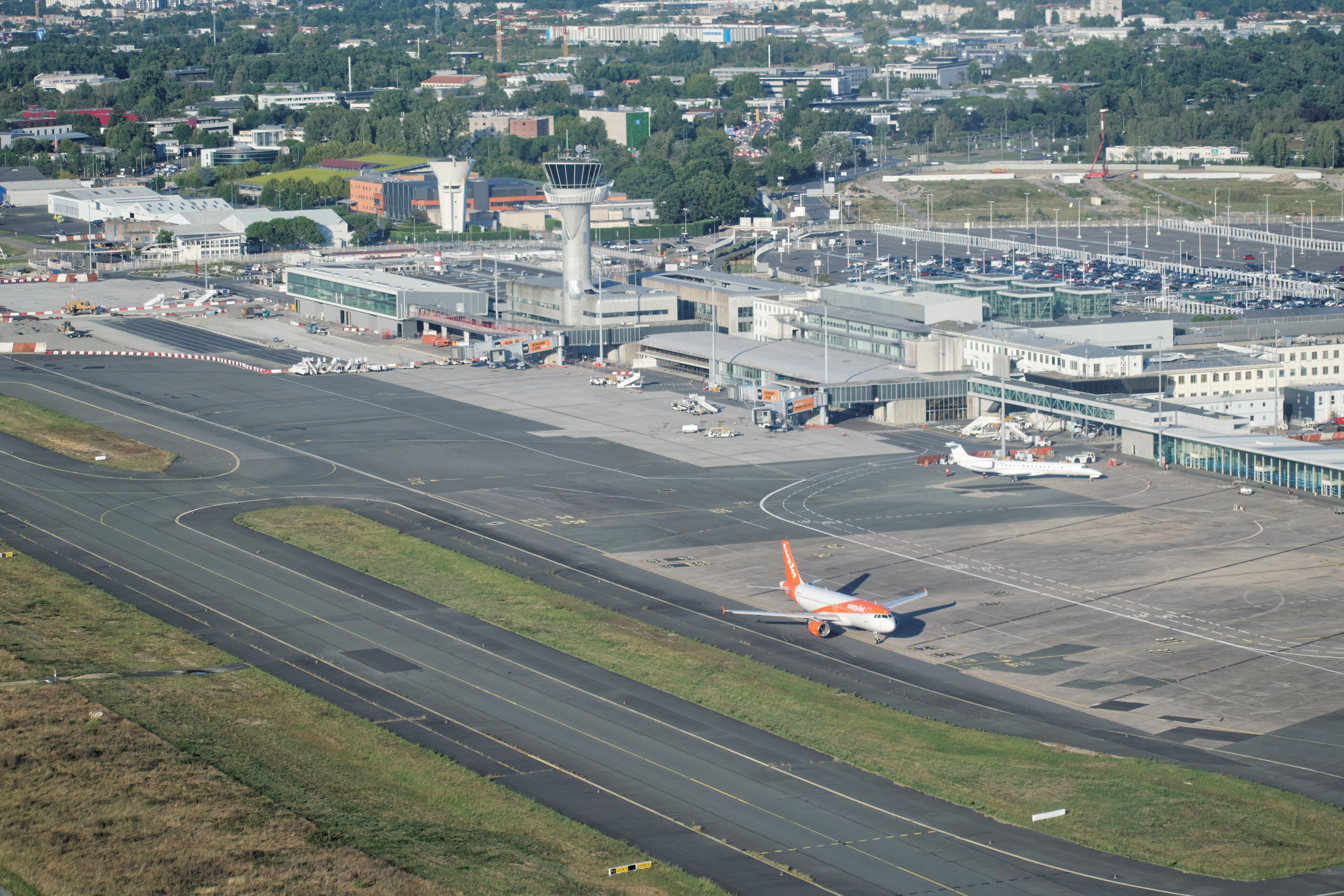
- IATA: BOD; ICAO: LFBD

Summary
- Airport type: Public / Military
- Owner/Operator: Aéroport de Bordeaux Mérignac (SA ADBM)
- Serves: Bordeaux
- Location: Mérignac, Gironde, France
- Opened: 1912; 114 years ago
- Operating base for: easyJet; Volotea
- Elevation AMSL: 162 ft (49 m)
- Coordinates: 44°49′42″N 000°42′56″W
- Website: www.bordeaux.aeroport.fr

Map
- Location of airport in Nouvelle-Aquitaine BOD/LFBD (France)

Runways
| Direction | Length | | Surface |
| Direction | m | ft | Surface |
|---|---|---|---|
| 05/23 | 3,100 | 10,171 | Asphalt |
| 11/29 | 2,415 | 7,923 | Asphalt |

Statistics (2019)
- Passengers: 7,703,143
- Passenger traffic change: ▲13.3%
- Sources: Statistics

Bordeaux–Mérignac Airport (French: Aéroport de Bordeaux-Mérignac) (IATA: BOD, ICAO: LFBD) is an international airport of Bordeaux, in southwestern France. It is situated in the commune of Mérignac, 12 km (7.5 mi) west of Bordeaux, within the département of the Gironde. It mainly features flights to metropolitan and leisure destinations in Europe, Northern Africa, and Canada, and serves as a base for easyJet and Volotea.

== History ==
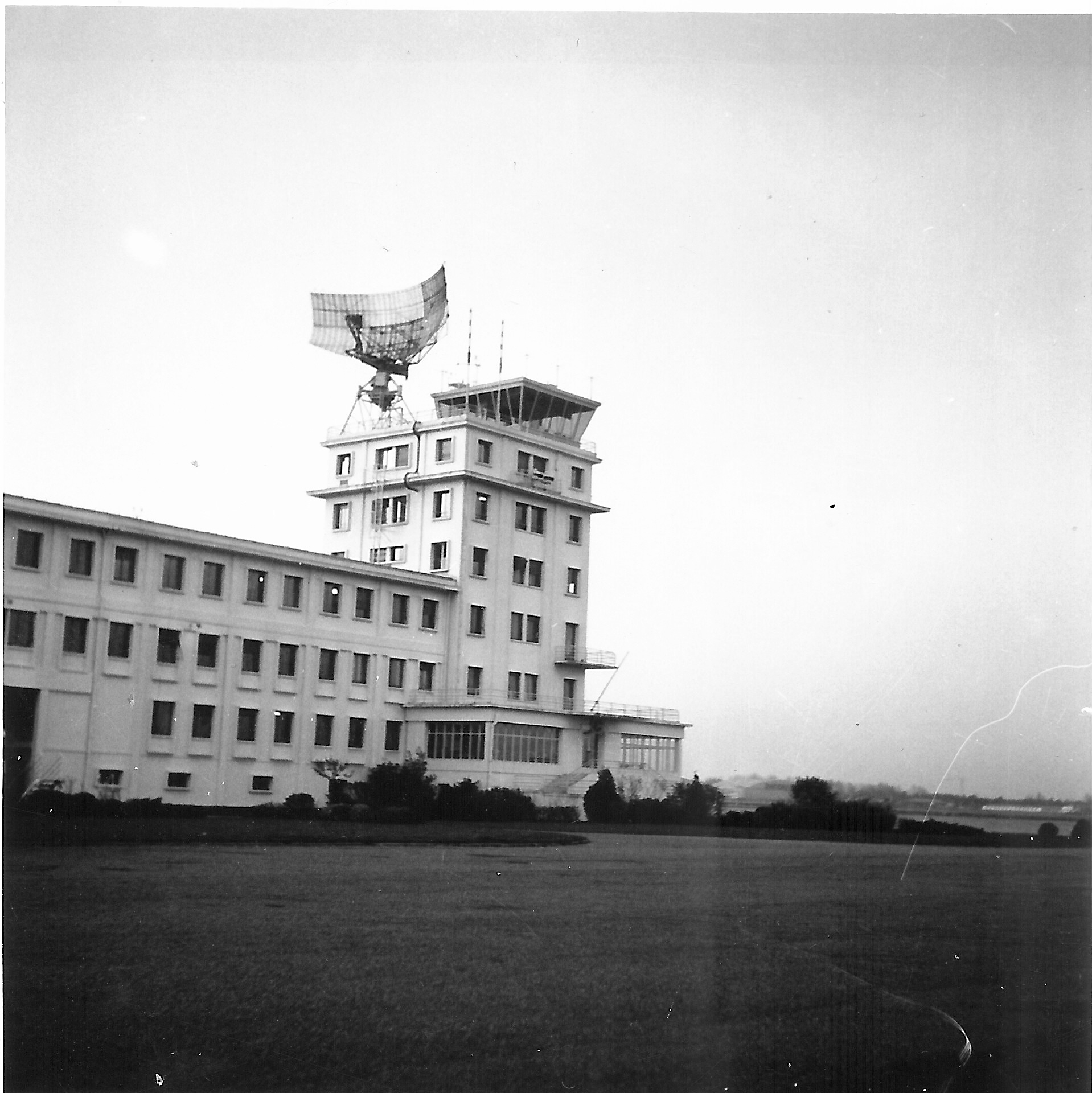
The former control tower in 1964.

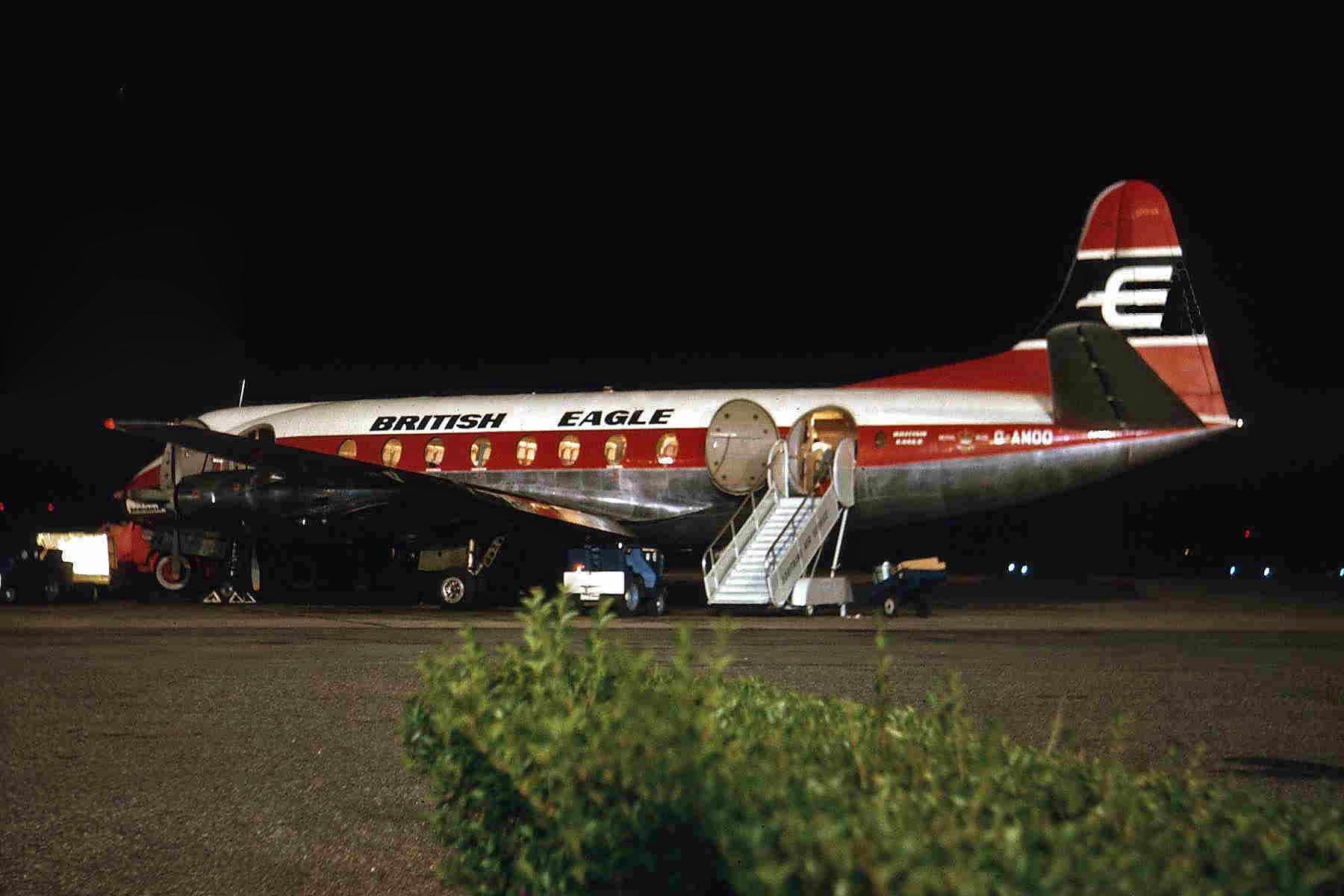
A British Eagle Viscount at Bordeaux Airport in 1964.

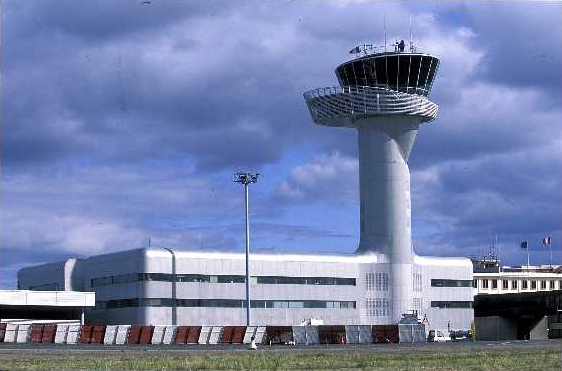
The control tower built in 2000.

=== Foundation and early years ===
Bordeaux Airport has been founded in 1912, after the French government purchased previously privately owned land. Its first non-temporary passenger terminal had been constructed in the early 1930s.

KG 40, the prime land-based maritime patrol Luftwaffe unit was primarily based at Bordeaux-Mérignac during the Occupation of France in World War II.

The airport underwent major expansion and refurbishment during the 1960s. The first scheduled flights to Paris were operated by Air Inter in 1962 and by 1970, Bordeaux handled over 500,000 passengers. During the 70s and by 1986, the terminal building has again been expanded significantly. By 1987, it reached a capacity of 2,000,000 passengers per year.

=== Development since the 1990s ===
From 1994-1996 an entirely new passenger terminal was built dedicated to frequent services on the Bordeaux-Paris route, followed by a new air traffic control tower in 2000. In 2010, another terminal expansion to be used by low-cost carriers was inaugurated - by 2014, these were responsible for 40 percent of the airport's traffic.

In 2017, Bordeaux surpassed 6 million passengers a year for the first time.

In May 2024, Ryanair announced it would be leaving Bordeaux–Mérignac Airport citing fee increases, leading to the termination of 40 routes. The airline subsequently ceased all operations at the airport by November 2024.

== Terminals ==
Bordeaux Airport has three passenger buildings:

- Terminal A is mainly for international flights.
- Terminal B, which had been inaugurated in 1996, has two levels and is principally dedicated to Air France traffic between Paris/Lyon and Bordeaux.
- Terminal billi, built in 2010 and expanded in 2015, is a separate facility for low cost carriers. It has one floor and has small check-in and arrivals areas as well as a departures area with six aircraft parking positions which are used for walk boarding. User of Terminal billi is easyJet.

== Airlines and destinations ==
The following airlines operate regular scheduled and charter flights from Bordeaux–Mérignac Airport:

| Airlines | Destinations |
|---|---|
| Aegean Airlines | Seasonal: Athens, Heraklion |
| Aer Lingus | Dublin; Seasonal: Cork |
| Air Algérie | Algiers, Oran |
| Air Arabia | Fès, Tangier |
| Air Dolomiti | Frankfurt |
| Air France | Lyon, Paris–Charles de Gaulle; Seasonal: Nice |
| Air Transat | Montréal–Trudeau |
| British Airways | London–Gatwick |
| Brussels Airlines | Seasonal: Brussels |
| Chalair Aviation | Brest |
| Corsair International | Seasonal: Fort-de-France, Pointe-à-Pitre |
| easyJet | Agadir, Athens, Basel/Mulhouse, Bristol, Brussels, Budapest, Essaouira, Faro, Geneva, Gran Canaria, Lanzarote, Lille, Lisbon, London–Gatwick, London–Luton, Lyon, Málaga, Marrakesh, Manchester, Marseille, Milan–Malpensa, Naples (begins 4 December 2026), Nice, Porto, Prague, Rabat, Rome–Fiumicino, Tenerife–South; Seasonal: Bastia, Belfast–International, Berlin, Birmingham, Cagliari, Catania, Corfu, Dubrovnik, Edinburgh, Funchal, Glasgow, Heraklion, Hurghada, Ibiza, Menorca, Olbia, Palermo, Palma de Mallorca, Rovaniemi, Vienna |
| Iberia | Madrid |
| KLM | Amsterdam |
| Loganair | Seasonal: Jersey |
| Lufthansa | Frankfurt; Seasonal: Munich |
| Luxair | Seasonal: Luxembourg |
| Norwegian Air Shuttle | Seasonal: Copenhagen, Oslo |
| Nouvelair | Djerba, Tunis |
| Royal Air Maroc | Casablanca, Marrakesh |
| Scandinavian Airlines | Copenhagen |
| Swiss International Air Lines | Zurich |
| Transavia | Agadir, Brussels, Istanbul, Marrakesh, Marseille, Porto, Seville; Seasonal: Boa Vista, Cairo, Dakar–Diass, Dakhla, Eindhoven, Faro, Gran Canaria, Hurghada, Sal, Tirana, Toulon |
| Tunisair | Tunis |
| Turkish Airlines | Istanbul |
| Volotea | Algiers, Athens, Barcelona, Florence, Lille, Málaga, Nice, Oran, Palermo, Rome–Fiumicino, Seville, Strasbourg, Tenerife–South, Valencia, Venice; Seasonal: Agadir, Ajaccio, Alghero, Alicante, Bari, Bastia, Brussels-Charleroi, Calvi, Corfu, Dubrovnik, Figari, Heraklion, Lanzarote, Montpellier, Madrid, Malta, Marrakesh, Marseille, Menorca, Olbia, Palma de Mallorca, Prague, Split, Verona |
| Vueling | Barcelona |
| Wizz Air | Bucharest–Otopeni, London–Luton, Rome–Fiumicino, Venice |

== Ground transport ==
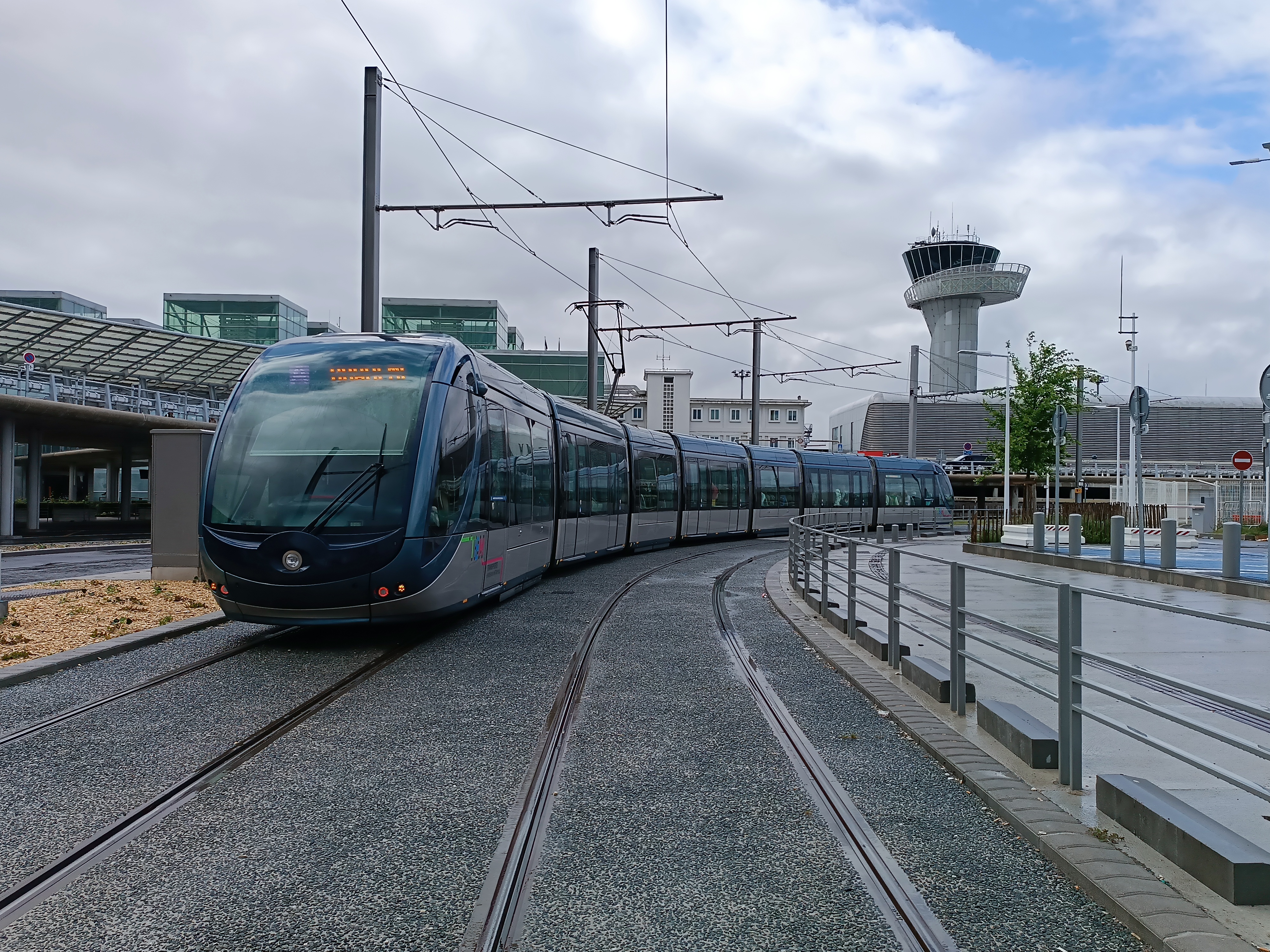
Bordeaux Tramway Line A at the airport

=== Road ===
The airport is accessible by road via the A630 autoroute (exit 11b). There is a shuttle by 30'Direct shuttle serving the Bordeaux Saint-Jean railway station. Bus route 1+ of Transports Bordeaux Métropole serves the city centre.

=== Tram ===
Bordeaux tramway's Line F links has linked the airport with the city centre since 29 April 2023.

== Accidents and incidents ==
- On 21 December 1987, Air Littoral Flight 1919, an Embraer EMB 120RT Brasilia registered as F-GEGH, crashed during approach to the airport, killing all 16 occupants onboard.

== See also ==
- United States Air Force in France
