= Spartaco Lavagnini =

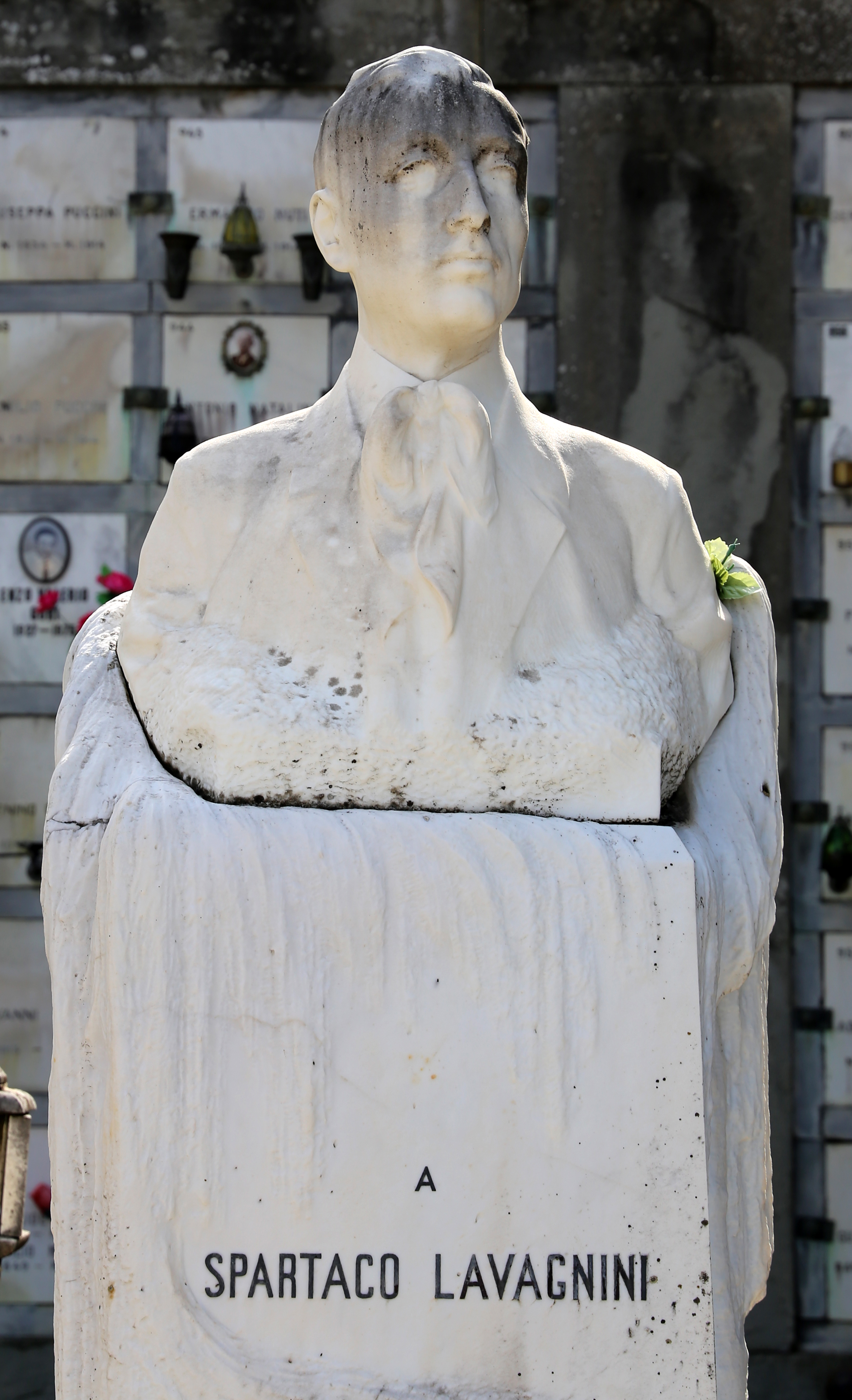
Bust on the tomb

Spartaco Lavagnini (born 6 September 1889 in Cortona; died 27 February 1921, Florence) was an Italian communist syndicalist and activist.

== Biography ==
Spartaco Lavagnini was a militant socialist, forerunner of the communist "svolta", killed by fascist squads as a retaliation for the anarchist attack against a nationalist parade on the same day in which students Carlo Menabuoni and Carabiniere Antonio Petrucci had died.
