= Monte Morello =

Mountain in Italy

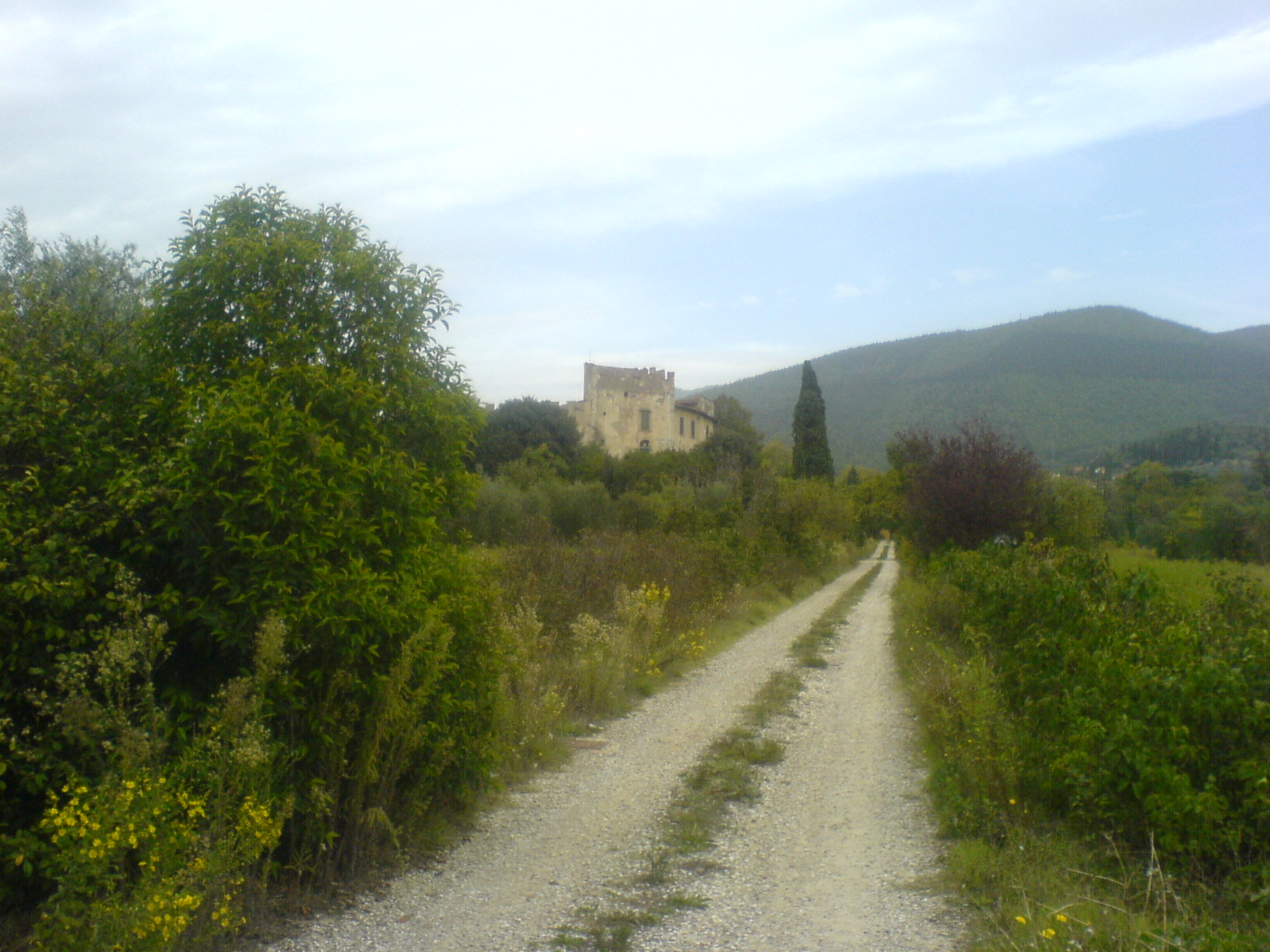
- view of Monte Morello

Highest point
- Elevation: 934 m (3,064 ft)
- Coordinates: 43.8822°N 11.2314°E

Geography
- Location within Italy
- Location: Florence, Tuscany, Italy

Monte Morello is the highest mountain (934 northwest of ⠀⠀Florence,lley, Italy. It is located to the north-west of Florence and it spreads across the borders of the municipalities of Florence, Vaglia, Sesto Fiorentino and Calenzano.

The terrain around Monte Morello is mostly hilly. The highest point in the area is 1,047 metres (3,410 ft) above sea level and 20.0 km (12.5 mi) northwest of Monte Morello. There are about 762 people per square kilometre (26.1 mi) around Monte Morello, which is densely populated. The nearest larger town is Florence, 11.57.1 mi) south of Monte Morello. The area around Monte Morello is almost entirely covered in mixed forest.

The climate is humid subtropical. The average temperature is 14°C . The hottest month is July, at 26°C, and the coldest is December, at 4 °C. The average rainfall 1,261 mm per year. The wettest month is November, with 205 mm of rain, and the driest is June, with 50 mm. 14 26 4 .
