= List of airports in France =

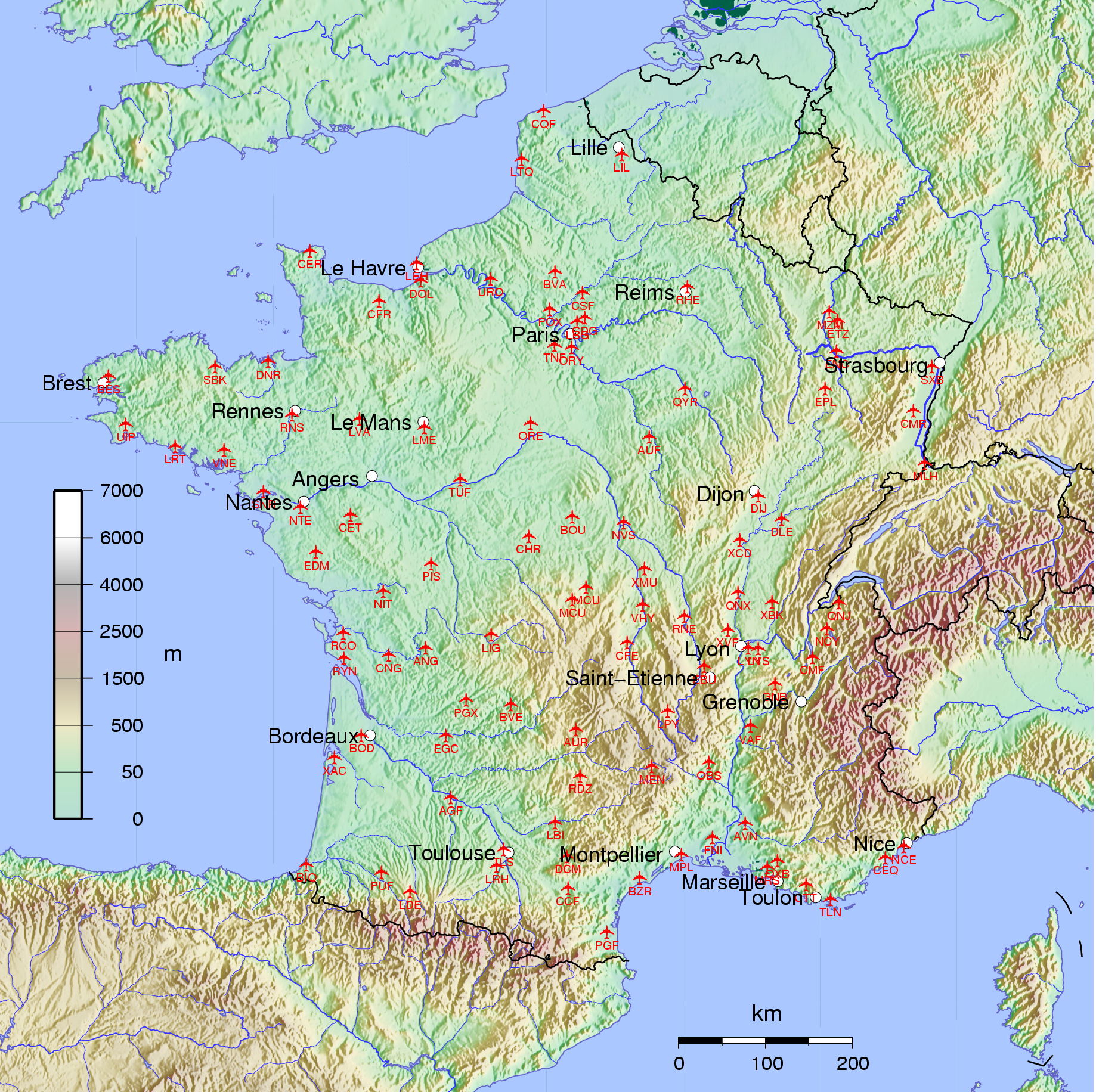
France airport map

Below is a list of airports in France, grouped by department and sorted by commune.

France is a country with its main territory in Western Europe, with several overseas territories and islands. The area known as metropolitan France extends from the Mediterranean Sea to the English Channel and the North Sea, as well as from the Rhine to the Atlantic Ocean.

As of 2023, France is divided into eighteen administrative regions, of which thirteen are in metropolitan France (twelve on the continent, plus Corsica) and five are overseas. The regions are divided into 101 numbered departments which are in turn subdivided into 333 arrondissements (districts), 2,054 cantons (subdivisions) and 34,945 communes (municipalities).

== Airports in metropolitan France ==
Locations shown in bold are as per the airport's AIP page. Most airports give two locations: the first is the city served, second is the city where the airport is located.

ICAO location identifiers are linked to each airport's Aeronautical Information Publication (AIP), where available, from Service d'information aéronautique (SIA), the French Aeronautical Information Service.

Airport names shown in bold indicate the airport has scheduled service on commercial airlines.

Links shown after airport name are intended to be moved as each airport's Wikipedia article is created: WEB indicates a link to the airport's website, UAF indicates a link to airport's page at L'Union des Aéroports Français.

City served / location	ICAO	IATA	Airport name	Usage
**01: Ain**
**Ambérieu-en-Bugey**	LFXA		Ambérieu-en-Bugey Air Base (BA 278)	Public/mil.
**Bellegarde-sur-Valserine** / Vouvray	LFHN	XBF	Bellegarde - Vouvray Aerodrome	Public
**Belley** / Peyrieu	LFKY		Belley - Peyrieu Aerodrome	Restricted
**Bourg-en-Bresse** / Ceyzériat	LFHS	XBK	Bourg – Ceyzériat Airport	Public
**Corlier**	LFJD		Corlier Aerodrome	Restricted
**Oyonnax** / Arbent	LFLK		Oyonnax - Arbent Aerodrome	Public
**Pérouges** / Meximieux	LFHC		Pérouges - Meximieux Aerodrome	Public
**02: Aisne**
**Château-Thierry** / Belleau	LFFH	XCY	Château-Thierry – Belleau Aerodrome	Restricted
**Laon** / Chambry	LFAF	XLN	Laon - Chambry Airport	Public
**Saint-Quentin** / Roupy	LFOW		Saint-Quentin - Roupy Airport	Public
**Saint-Simon** / Clastres	LFYT		Saint-Simon – Clastres Air Base	Military
**Soissons** / Courmelles	LFJS	XSS	Soissons - Courmelles Airport	Public
**03: Allier**
**Lapalisse** / Périgny	LFHX		Lapalisse - Périgny Airport	Public
**Lurcy-Lévis**	LFJU		Lurcy-Lévis Aerodrome	Restricted
**Montluçon** / Domérat	LFLT		Montluçon - Domérat Aerodrome	Restricted
**Moulins** / Montbeugny	LFHY	XMU	Moulins – Montbeugny Airport	Public
**Vichy** / Charmeil	LFLV	VHY	Vichy−Charmeil Airport	Public
**04: Alpes-de-Haute-Provence**
**Barcelonnette** / Saint-Pons	LFMR	BAE	Barcelonnette – Saint-Pons Airfield	Public
**Château-Arnoux-Saint-Auban**	LFMX		Château-Arnoux-Saint-Auban Airport	Public
**Puimoisson**	LFTP		Puimoisson Aerodrome	Restricted
**Sisteron** / Thèze	LFNS		Sisteron - Thèze Aerodrome	Restricted
**05: Hautes-Alpes**
**Aspres-sur-Buëch**	LFNJ		Aspres-sur-Buëch Aerodrome	Restricted
**Gap** / Tallard	LFNA	GAT	Gap–Tallard Airport	Public
**Mont-Dauphin** / Saint-Crépin	LFNC	SCP	Mont-Dauphin - Saint-Crépin Airport	Public
**Serres** / La Bâtie-Montsaléon	LFTM		Serres - La Bâtie-Montsaléon Aerodrome	Restricted
**06: Alpes-Maritimes**
**Cannes** / Mandelieu-la-Napoule	LFMD	CEQ	Cannes–Mandelieu Airport	Public
Juan-les-Pins		JLP	Juan-les-Pins Heliport	
**Nice** / Côte d'Azur	LFMN	NCE	**Nice Côte d'Azur Airport**	Public
Cannes / Promenade de la Croisette		JCA	Cannes−La Croisette Heliport	
**07: Ardèche**
**Aubenas** / Ardèche Méridional	LFHO	OBS	Aubenas Aerodrome	Public
**Langogne** / Lespéron	LFHL		Langogne - Lespéron Airport	Public
**Ruoms**	LFHF		Ruoms Aerodrome	Restricted
**08: Ardennes**
**Charleville-Mézières**	LFQV		Charleville-Mézières Aerodrome (UAF)	Public
**Rethel** / Perthes	LFAP		Rethel - Perthes Aerodrome	Restricted
**Sedan** / Douzy	LFSJ	XSW	Sedan - Douzy Airport	Public
**09: Ariège**
**Pamiers** / Les Pujols	LFDJ		Pamiers - Les Pujols Airport	Public
**Saint-Girons** / Antichan	LFCG		Saint-Girons - Antichan Airport	Public
**10: Aube**
**Bar-sur-Seine**	LFFR		Bar-sur-Seine Aerodrome	Restricted
**Brienne-le-Château**	LFFN		Brienne-le-Château Airport	Public
**Juvancourt**	LFQX		Juvancourt Aerodrome	Restricted
**Romilly-sur-Seine**	LFQR		Romilly-sur-Seine Airport	Public
**Troyes** / Barberey-Saint-Sulpice	LFQB	QYR	Troyes – Barberey Airport	Public
**11: Aude**
**Carcassonne** / Salvaza	LFMK	CCF	**Carcassonne Airport**	Public
**Castelnaudary** / Villeneuve-la-Comptal	LFMW		Castelnaudary – Villeneuve Airport	Public
**Lézignan-Corbières**	LFMZ		Lézignan-Corbières Airport	Public
**Moussoulens**			Moussoulens Air Base	Military
**Puivert**	LFNW		Puivert Aerodrome	Restricted
**12: Aveyron**
**Cassagnes-Bégonhès**	LFIG		Cassagnes-Bégonhès Airport	Public
**Millau** / Larzac	LFCM		Millau - Larzac Airport	Public
**Rodez** / Marcillac-Vallon	LFCR	RDZ	**Rodez–Aveyron Airport**	Public
**Saint-Affrique** / Belmont-sur-Rance	LFIF		Saint-Affrique - Belmont Aerodrome	Restricted
**Villefranche-de-Rouergue**	LFCV		Villefranche-de-Rouergue Airport	Public
**13: Bouches-du-Rhône**
**Aubagne**		JAH	Aubagne - Agora Heliport	
**Aix-en-Provence** / Les Milles	LFMA	QXB	Aix-en-Provence Aerodrome (BA 114)	Public/mil.
**Berre-l'Étang** / La Fare-les-Oliviers	LFNR		Berre - La Fare Aerodrome (UAF)	Restricted
**Istres** / Le Tubé	LFMI	QIE	Istres-Le Tubé Air Base (BA 125)	Public/mil.
**Le Mazet-de-Romanin**	LFNZ		Le Mazet-de-Romanin Aerodrome (UAF)	Restricted
**Marseille** / Marignane	LFML	MRS	**Marseille Provence Airport**	Public
**Salon-de-Provence**	LFMY		Salon-de-Provence Air Base (BA 701)	Military
**Salon-de-Provence** / Eyguières	LFNE		Salon - Eyguières Airport	Public
**14: Calvados**
**Caen** / Carpiquet	LFRK	CFR	**Caen – Carpiquet Airport**	Public
**Condé-sur-Noireau**/Clécy	LFAN		Condé-sur-Noireau Aerodrome	Closed 1999
**Deauville** / Normandie	LFRG	DOL	**Deauville – Normandie Airport**	Public
**Falaise** / Damblainville	LFAS		Falaise - Monts d'Eraines Aerodrome	Restricted
**15: Cantal**
**Aurillac**	LFLW	AUR	**Aurillac – Tronquières Airport**	Public
**Saint-Flour** / Coltines	LFHQ		Saint-Flour - Coltines Airport	Public
**16: Charente**
**Angoulême** / Brie / Champniers	LFBU	ANG	Angoulême – Cognac International Airport	Public
**Chalais**	LFIH		Chalais Airport	Public
**Cognac** / Châteaubernard	LFBG	CNG	Cognac – Châteaubernard Air Base (BA 709)	Military
**17: Charente-Maritime**
**Jonzac** / Neulles	LFCJ		Jonzac - Neulles Airport	Public
**La Rochelle** / Île de Ré	LFBH	LRH	**La Rochelle – Île de Ré Airport**	Public
**Marennes**	LFJI		Marennes Aerodrome	Restricted
**Pons** / Avy	LFCP		Pons - Avy Airport	Public
**Rochefort** / Saint-Agnant	LFDN	RCO	Rochefort – Saint-Agnant Airport (BA 721) (UAF)	Public/mil.
**Rochefort** / Soubise	LFXR		Rochefort - Soubise Airport	
**Royan** / Médis	LFCY	RYN	Royan – Médis Aerodrome	Public
**Saint-Jean-d'Angély** / Saint-Denis-du-Pin	LFIY		Saint-Jean-d'Angély - Saint-Denis-du-Pin Aerodrome	Restricted
**Saint-Pierre-d'Oléron**	LFDP		Saint-Pierre-d'Oléron Airport	Public
**Saintes** / Thénac	LFXB	XST	Saintes - Thénac Airport (EETAA 722)	Public/mil.
**18: Cher**
**Aubigny-sur-Nère**	LFEH		Aubigny-sur-Nère Airport	Public
**Avord**	LFOA		Avord Air Base (BA 702)	Military
**Bourges**	LFLD	BOU	Bourges Airport	Public
**Châteauneuf-sur-Cher**	LFFU		Châteauneuf-sur-Cher Airport	Public
**Vierzon** / Méreau	LFFV	XVZ	Vierzon - Méreau Aerodrome	Restricted
**19: Corrèze**
**Brive-la-Gaillarde** / Souillac	LFSL	BVE	**Brive–Souillac Airport**	Public
**Brive-la-Gaillarde** / La Roche	LFBV	~~BVE~~	Brive–Laroche Airport	Public
**Égletons**	LFDE		Égletons Airport	Public
**Ussel** / Thalamy	LFCU		Ussel - Thalamy Airport	Public
**2A: Corse-du-Sud** (South Corsica)
**Ajaccio** / Campo dell'Oro	LFKJ	AJA	**Ajaccio Napoleon Bonaparte Airport**	Public
**Figari** Corse-du-Sud	LFKF	FSC	**Figari–Sud Corse Airport**	Public
**Propriano**	LFKO	PRP	Propriano Airport	Public
**Sari-Solenzara**	LFKS	SOZ	Solenzara Air Base (BA 126)	Military
**2B: Haute-Corse** (North Corsica)
**Bastia** / Poretta	LFKB	BIA	**Bastia – Poretta Airport**	Public
**Calvi** / Sainte-Catherine	LFKC	CLY	**Calvi – Sainte-Catherine Airport**	Public
**Corte**	LFKT		Corte Airport	Public
**Ghisonaccia** / Alzitone	LFKG		Ghisonaccia Alzitone Airport	Restricted
**21: Côte-d'Or**
**Beaune** / Challanges	LFGF	XBV	Beaune - Challanges Airport	Public
**Cessey** / Baigneux-les-Juifs	LFSY		Cessey Airport	Private
**Châtillon-sur-Seine**	LFQH		Châtillon-sur-Seine Airport	Public
**Dijon** / Darois	LFGI		Dijon - Darois Airport	Public
**Dijon** / Longvic	LFSD	DIJ	Dijon–Bourgogne Airport (BA 102)	Public/mil.
**Nuits-Saint-Georges**	LFGZ		Nuits-Saint-Georges Aerodrome	Restricted
**Pouilly-en-Auxois** / Maconge	LFEP		Pouilly - Maconge Aerodrome	Restricted
**Saulieu** / Liernais	LFEW		Saulieu - Liernais Airport	Public
**Semur-en-Auxois**	LFGQ		Semur-en-Auxois Airport	Public
**Til-Châtel**	LFET		Til-Châtel Airport	Public
**22: Côtes-d'Armor**
**Dinan** / Trélivan	LFEB		Dinan - Trélivan Airport	Public
**Lannion**	LFRO	LAI	Lannion – Côte de Granit Airport	Public
**Saint-Brieuc** / Côtes-d'Armor	LFRT	SBK	Saint-Brieuc – Armor Airport	Public
**23: Creuse**
**Guéret** / Saint-Laurent	LFCE	XGT	Guéret - Saint-Laurent Airport	Public
**Montluçon** / Guéret	LFBK	MCU	Montluçon – Guéret Airport	Public
**24: Dordogne**
**Belvès** / Saint-Pardoux-et-Vielvic	LFIB		Belvès - Saint-Pardoux Aerodrome	Restricted
**Bergerac** / Roumanière	LFBE	EGC	**Bergerac Dordogne Périgord Airport**	Public
**Périgueux** / Bassillac	LFBX	PGX	Périgueux Bassillac Airport	Public
**Ribérac** / Saint-Aulaye	LFIK		Ribérac - Saint-Aulaye Aerodrome	Restricted
**Sainte-Foy-la-Grande**	LFDF		Sainte-Foy-la-Grande Airport	Public
**Sarlat-la-Canéda** / Domme	LFDS	XSL	Sarlat - Domme Airport	Public
**25: Doubs**
**Besançon** / La Vèze	LFQM	QBQ	Besançon – La Vèze Aerodrome	Public
**Besançon** / Thise	LFSA		Besançon - Thise Airport	Public
**Montbéliard** / Courcelles-lès-Montbéliard	LFSM	XMF	Montbéliard – Courcelles Aerodrome	Public
**Pontarlier**	LFSP		Pontarlier Airport	Public
**Valdahon**	LFXH		Valdahon Air Base	Military
**26: Drôme**
**Aubenasson**	LFJF		Aubenasson Aerodrome	Restricted
**La Motte-Chalancon**	LFJE		La Motte-Chalancon Aerodrome	Restricted
**Montélimar** / Ancône	LFLQ	XMK	Montélimar - Ancône Airport	Public
**Pierrelatte**	LFHD		Pierrelate Airport	Public
**Romans-sur-Isère** / Saint-Paul-lès-Romans	LFHE		Romans - Saint-Paul Airport	Public
**Saint-Jean-en-Royans**	LFKE		Saint-Jean-en-Royans Aerodrome	Restricted
**Saint-Rambert-d'Albon**	LFLR		Saint-Rambert-d'Albon Airport	Public
**Valence** / Chabeuil	LFLU	VAF	Valence-Chabeuil Airport	Public
**27: Eure**
**Bernay** / Saint-Martin-du-Tilleul	LFPD	XBX	Bernay–St Martin Airport	Public
**Étrépagny**	LFFY		Étrépagny Aerodrome	Restricted
**Évreux** / Fauville	LFOE	EVX	Évreux-Fauville Air Base (BA 105)	Military
**Saint-André-de-l'Eure**	LFFD		Saint-André-de-l'Eure Airport	Restricted
**28: Eure-et-Loir**
**Bailleau-Armenonville**	LFFL		Bailleau-Armenonville Aerodrome	Restricted
**Chartres** / Champhol	LFOR	QTJ	Chartres – Champhol Aerodrome	Public
**Châteaudun**	LFOC		Châteaudun Airport (BA 279)	Public/mil.
**Dreux** / Vernouillet	LFON		Vernouillet Airport	Public
**29: Finistère**
**Brest** / Guipavas	LFRB	BES	**Brest Bretagne Airport**	Public
**Landivisiau**	LFRJ	LDV	Landivisiau Air Base	Military
**Lanvéoc** / Poulmic	LFRL		Lanvéoc - Poulmic Air Base	Military
**Morlaix** / Ploujean	LFRU	MXN	Morlaix – Ploujean Airport	Public
**Ushant**	LFEC	OUI	**Ushant Airport**	Public
**Quimper** / Pluguffan	LFRQ	UIP	Quimper–Cornouaille Airport	Public
**30: Gard**
**Alès** / Deaux	LFMS		Alès - Deaux Airport	Public
**Avignon** / Pujaut	LFNT		Avignon - Pujaut Aerodrome (UAF)	Restricted
**La Grand-Combe**	LFTN		La Grand-Combe Aerodrome	Restricted
**Nîmes** / Courbessac	LFME		Nîmes - Courbessac Airport	Public
**Nîmes** / Garons	LFTW	FNI	**Nîmes–Alès–Camargue–Cévennes Airport**	Public
**Uzès**	LFNU		Uzès Aerodrome	Restricted
**31: Haute-Garonne**
**Bagnères-de-Luchon**	LFCB		Bagnères-de-Luchon Airport	Public
**Cazères** / Palaminy	LFJH		Cazères - Palaminy Aerodrome	Restricted
**Toulouse** / Bourg-Saint-Bernard	LFIT		Toulouse - Bourg-Saint-Bernard Aerodrome	Restricted
**Toulouse** / Montaudran	LFIO	XYT	Toulouse - Montaudran Airport	
**Muret** / Lherm	LFBR		Muret – Lherm Aerodrome	Public
**Montagne Noire** / Revel	LFMG		Montagne Noire Aerodrome	Restricted
**Revel** / Montgey	LFIR		Revel - Montgey Aerodrome	Restricted
**Saint-Gaudens** / Montréjeau	LFIM		Saint-Gaudens - Montréjeau Airport	Public
**Toulouse** / Blagnac	LFBO	TLS	**Toulouse–Blagnac Airport**	Public
**Toulouse** / Francazal	LFBF		Toulouse - Francazal Air Base (BA 101)	Military
**Toulouse** / Balma	LFCL		Toulouse – Lasbordes Airport	Public
**32: Gers**
**Auch** / Lamothe-Goas	LFDH		Auch - Lamothe Airport (UAF)	Public
**Condom** / Valence-sur-Baïse	LFID		Condom - Valence-sur-Baïse Airport	Public
**Nogaro**	LFCN		Nogaro Airport	Public
**33: Gironde**
**Andernos-les-Bains**	LFCD		Andernos-les-Bains Airport	Public
**Arcachon** / La Teste-de-Buch	LFCH	XAC	Arcachon – La Teste-de-Buch Airport	Public
**Bordeaux** / Léognan / Saucats	LFCS		Bordeaux - Leognan - Saucats Airport	Public
**Bordeaux** / Mérignac	LFBD	BOD	**Bordeaux–Mérignac Airport** (BA 106)	Public/mil.
**Bordeaux** / Souge	LFDO		Bordeaux - Souge Aerodrome	
**Bordeaux** / Yvrac	LFDY		Bordeaux - Yvrac Aerodrome	Restricted
**La Réole** / Floudès	LFDR		La Réole - Floudès Airport	Public
**Cazaux** / La Teste-de-Buch	LFBC		Cazaux Air Base (BA 120)	Military
**Lesparre-Médoc** / Saint-Laurent-Médoc	LFDU		Lesparre - Saint-Laurent-de-Médoc Airport	Public
**Libourne** / Les Artigues-de-Lussac	LFDI	XLR	Libourne - Artigues-de-Lussac Airport	Public
**Montendre** / Marcillac	LFDC		Montendre - Marcillac Airport	Public
**Soulac-sur-Mer**	LFDK		Soulac-sur-Mer Airport	Public
**Vendays-Montalivet**	LFIV		Vendays-Montalivet Aerodrome	Restricted
**34: Hérault**
**Bédarieux** / La Tour-sur-Orb	LFNX		Bédarieux - La Tour-sur-Orb Aerodrome	Restricted
**Béziers** / Vias	LFMU	BZR	**Béziers Cap d'Agde Airport**	Public
**Montpellier** / Candillargues	LFNG		Montpellier - Candillargues Airport	Public
**Montpellier** / Mauguio	LFMT	MPL	**Montpellier–Méditerranée Airport**	Public
**Pézenas** / Nizas	LFNP		Pézenas - Nizas Aerodrome	Restricted
**Saint-Martin-de-Londres**	LFNL		Saint-Martin-de-Londres Aerodrome	Restricted
**35: Ille-et-Vilaine**
**Dinard** / Pleurtuit / Saint-Malo	LFRD	DNR	Dinard–Pleurtuit–Saint-Malo Airport	Public
**Redon** / Bains-sur-Oust	LFER	XRN	Redon - Bains-sur-Oust Aerodrome (UAF)	Public
**Rennes** / Saint-Jacques-de-la-Lande	LFRN	RNS	**Rennes–Saint-Jacques Airport**	Public
**Saint-Servan** / Saint-Malo	LFEO	XSB	Saint-Servan Airport	
**36: Indre**
**Argenton**-sur-Creuse	LFEG		Argenton-sur-Creuse Airport	Public
**Châteauroux** / Déols	LFLX	CHR	Châteauroux-Centre "Marcel Dassault" Airport	Public
**Châteauroux** / Villers-les-Ormes	LFEJ		Châteauroux - Villers Airport	Public
**Issoudun** / Le Fay	LFEK		Issoudun - Le Fay Airport	Public
**Le Blanc**	LFEL		Le Blanc Airport	Public
**37: Indre-et-Loire**
**Amboise** / Dierre	LFEF	XAM	Amboise - Dierre Airport	Public
**Tours** / Le Louroux	LFJT		Tours - Le Louroux Aerodrome	Restricted
**Tours** / Sorigny	LFEN		Tours - Sorigny Airport	Public
**Tours** / Loire Valley	LFOT	TUF	**Tours Val de Loire Airport**	Public
**38: Isère**
**Grenoble** / Le Versoud	LFLG		Grenoble – Le Versoud Aerodrome	Public
**Grenoble** / Saint-Étienne-de-Saint-Geoirs	LFLS	GNB	**Alpes–Isère Airport**	Public
**Alpe d'Huez**	LFHU	AHZ	Alpe d'Huez Airport	
**La Tour-du-Pin** / Cessieu	LFKP		La Tour-du-Pin - Cessieu Aerodrome	Restricted
**Morestel**	LFHI		Morestel Aerodrome	Public
**Saint-Jean-d'Avelanne**	LFKH		Saint-Jean-d'Avelanne Aerodrome	Restricted
**Vienne** / Reventin-Vaugris	LFHH	XVI	Vienne - Reventin Airport	Public
**39: Jura**
**Arbois**	LFGD		Arbois Aerodrome	Restricted
**Champagnole** / Crotenay	LFGX		Champagnole - Crotenay Aerodrome	Restricted
**Dole** / Tavaux	LFGJ	DLE	**Dole–Jura Airport**	Public
**Lons-le-Saunier** / Courlaoux	LFGL	XLL	Lons-le-Saunier - Courlaoux Airport	Public
**Saint-Claude** / Pratz	LFKZ	XTC	Saint-Claude - Pratz Aerodrome	Restricted
**40: Landes**
**Aire-sur-l'Adour**	LFDA		Aire-sur-l'Adour Airport	Public
**Biscarrosse** / Parentis-en-Born	LFBS		Biscarrosse – Parentis Airport	Public
**Dax** / Seyresse	LFBY	XDA	Dax - Seyresse Airport	Public
**Mimizan**	LFCZ		Mimizan Airport	Public
**Mont-de-Marsan**	LFBM	XMJ	Mont-de-Marsan Air Base (BA 118)	Military
**Rion-des-Landes**	LFIL		Rion-des-Landes Aerodrome	Public
**41: Loir-et-Cher**
**Blois** / Le Breuil	LFOQ	XBQ	Blois - Le Breuil Airport (UAF)	Public
**Lamotte-Beuvron**	LFFM		Lamotte-Beuvron Aerodrome	Restricted
**Romorantin-Lanthenay** / Pruniers	LFYR		Romorantin - Pruniers Airport (DA 273)	Public/mil.
**42: Loire**
**Feurs** / Chambéon	LFLZ		Feurs - Chambéon Airport	Public
**Roanne** / Renaison	LFLO	RNE	Roanne Renaison Airport (UAF)	Public
**Saint-Chamond** / L'Horme	LFHG		Saint-Chamond - L'Horme Airport	Public
**Saint-Étienne** / Andrézieux-Bouthéon	LFMH	EBU	Saint-Étienne–Bouthéon Airport	Public
**Saint-Galmier**	LFKM		Saint-Galmier Aerodrome	Restricted
**43: Haute-Loire**
**Brioude** / Beaumont	LFHR		Brioude - Beaumont Airport	Public
**Le Puy-en-Velay** / Loudes	LFHP	LPY	**Le Puy – Loudes Airport**	Public
**44: Loire-Atlantique**
**Ancenis**	LFFI		Ancenis Aerodrome (UAF)	Public
**La Baule-Escoublac**	LFRE	LBY	La Baule - Pornichet - Le Pouliguen Airport (UAF)	Public
**Nantes** / Bouguenais	LFRS	NTE	**Nantes Atlantique Airport**	Public
**Saint-Nazaire** / Montoir-de-Bretagne	LFRZ	SNR	Saint-Nazaire Montoir Airport (UAF)	Public
**45: Loiret**
**Briare** / Châtillon-sur-Loire	LFEI		Briare - Châtillon Airport	Public
**Montargis** / Vimory	LFEM		Montargis - Vimory Airport (UAF)	Public
**Orléans** / Bricy	LFOJ		Orléans – Bricy Air Base (BA 123)	Military
**Orléans** / Saint-Denis-de-l'Hôtel	LFOZ	ORE	Orléans – Saint-Denis-de-l'Hôtel Airport	Public
**Pithiviers**	LFFP		Pithiviers Aerodrome	Restricted
**46: Lot**
**Cahors** / Lalbenque	LFCC	ZAO	Cahors - Lalbenque Airport	Public
**Figeac** / Livernon	LFCF		Figeac - Livernon Airport	Public
**47: Lot-et-Garonne**
**Agen** / La Garenne	LFBA	AGF	Agen La Garenne Airport	Public
**Fumel** / Montayral	LFDX		Fumel - Montayral Airport	Public
**Marmande** / Virazeil	LFDM		Marmande – Virazeil Airport	Public
**Villeneuve**-sur-Lot	LFCW		Villeneuve-sur-Lot Airport	Public
**48: Lozère**
**Mende** / Brenoux	LFNB	MEN	Mende - Brenoux Airport	Public
**Florac** / Sainte-Enimie	LFNO		Florac - Sainte-Enimie Aerodrome	Restricted
**49: Maine-et-Loire**
**Angers** / Avrillé	LFRA		Angers – Avrillé Airport	
**Angers** / Marcé	LFJR	ANE	Angers – Loire Airport	Public
**Châteaubriant** / Pouancé	LFTQ		Châteaubriant - Pouancé Aerodrome	Restricted
**Cholet** / Le Pontreau	LFOU	CET	Cholet - Le Pontreau Aerodrome (UAF)	Public
**Saumur** / Saint-Florent-le-Vieil	LFOD	XSU	Saumur - Saint-Hilaire - Saint-Florent Aerodrome (UAF)	Public
**50: Manche**
**Avranches** / Le Val-Saint-Père	LFRW		Avranches - Le Val-Saint-Père Aerodrome	Restricted
**Cherbourg-Octeville** / Maupertus-sur-Mer	LFRC	CER	Cherbourg – Maupertus Airport	Public
**Granville** / Mont-Saint-Michel	LFRF	GFR	Granville - Mont Saint-Michel Aerodrome (UAF)	Public
**Lessay**	LFOM		Lessay Airport	Public
**Vauville**	LFAU		Vauville Aerodrome	Restricted
**51: Marne**
**Châlons-en-Champagne** / Écury-sur-Coole	LFQK		Châlons - Écury-sur-Coole Airport	Public
**Châlons-en-Champagne** / Vatry	LFOK	XCR	**Châlons Vatry Airport**	Public
**Épernay** / Plivot	LFSW	XEP	Épernay - Plivot Airport	Public
**Marigny** / Le Grand	LFYM		Marigny - Le Grand Airport	
**Mourmelon-le-Grand**	LFXM		Mourmelon Aerodrome	
**Reims** / Champagne-Ardenne	LFSR	RHE	Reims - Champagne Aerodrome (BA 112)	Public
**Reims** / Prunay	LFQA		Reims – Prunay Aerodrome	Public
**Sézanne** / Saint-Remy-sous-Broyes	LFFZ		Sézanne - Saint-Remy Airport	Public
**Vitry-le-François** / Vauclerc	LFSK		Vitry-le-François - Vauclerc Airport	Public
**52: Haute-Marne**
**Chaumont** / Semoutiers	LFJA	XCW	Quartier Général d'Aboville (UAF)	Government/mil.
**Joinville** / Val-d'Ornain	LFFJ		Joinville - Mussey Aerodrome	Restricted
**Langres** / Rolampont	LFSU		Langres - Rolampont Airport	Public
**Saint-Dizier**	LFSI		Saint-Dizier – Robinson Air Base (BA 113)	Military
**53: Mayenne**
**Laval** / Entrammes	LFOV	LVA	Laval - Entrammes Airport (UAF)	Public
**54: Meurthe-et-Moselle**
**Doncourt-lès-Conflans**	LFGR		Doncourt-lès-Conflans Airport	Public
**Longuyon** / Villette	LFGS		Longuyon - Villette Airport	Public
**Lunéville** / Croismare	LFQC		Lunéville-Croismare Airport	Public
**Nancy** / Azelot	LFEX		Nancy - Azelot Aerodrome	Restricted
**Nancy** / Tomblaine	LFSN	ENC	Nancy-Essey Airport	Public
**Nancy** / Malzéville	LFEZ		Nancy - Malzéville Aerodrome	Restricted
**Nancy** / Ochey	LFSO		Nancy – Ochey Air Base (BA 133)	Military
**Pont-Saint-Vincent**	LFSV		Pont-Saint-Vincent Aerodrome	Restricted
**Toul** / Rosières-en-Haye	~~LFSL~~		Toul-Rosières Air Base (BA 136)	Military
**Villerupt**	LFAW		Villerupt Aerodrome	Restricted
**55: Meuse**
**Bar-le-Duc** / Les Hauts-de-Chée	LFEU	XBD	Bar-le-Duc - Les Hauts-de-Chée Airport	Public
**Étain** / Rouvres-en-Woëvre	LFQE		Étain - Rouvres Air Base	
**Montmédy** / Marville	LFYK		Montmédy - Marville Airport	
**Verdun** / Le Rozelier	LFGW	XVN	Verdun-Le-Rozelier Airport	Public
**56: Morbihan**
**Belle Île** / Le Palais	LFEA		Belle-Île Aerodrome (UAF)	Public
**Coëtquidan** / Guer	LFXQ		Coëtquidan Air Base	Military
**Guiscriff**	LFES		Guiscriff Scaer Airport	
**Lorient** / Lann / Bihoué	LFRH	LRT	**Lorient South Brittany Airport**	Government
**Ploërmel** / Loyat	LFRP		Ploërmel - Loyat Airport	Public
**Pontivy**	LFED		Pontivy Airport	Public
**Quiberon**	LFEQ		Quiberon Aerodrome (UAF)	Public
**Vannes** / Meucon	LFRV	VNE	**Vannes Airport**	Public
**57: Moselle**
**Dieuze** / Guéblange	LFQZ		Dieuze - Gueblange Aerodrome	Restricted
**Metz** / Frescaty	LFSF	MZM	Metz-Frescaty Air Base (BA 128)	Military
**Metz** / Nancy	LFJL	ETZ	**Metz–Nancy–Lorraine Airport**	Public
**Phalsbourg** / Bourscheid	LFQP		Quartier La Horie	Military
**Sarrebourg** / Buhl	LFGT		Sarrebourg - Buhl Airport	Public
**Sarreguemines** / Neunkirch	LFGU		Sarreguemines - Neunkirch Airport	Public
**Thionville** / Yutz	LFGV	XTH	Thionville - Yutz Airport	Public
**58: Nièvre**
**Clamecy**	LFJC		Clamecy Airport	Public
**Cosne-Cours-sur-Loire**	LFGH		Cosne-sur-Loire Airport	Public
**Nevers** / Fourchambault	LFQG	NVS	Nevers - Fourchambault Airport (WEB UAF)	Public
**59: Nord**
**Cambrai** / Épinoy	LFQI	XCB	Cambrai - Épinoy Air Base (BA 103)	Military
**Cambrai** / Niergnies	LFYG		Cambrai-Niergnies Airport	Public
**Dunkirk** / Les Moëres	LFAK		Dunkerque – Les Moëres Airport	Restricted
**Lille** / Lesquin	LFQQ	LIL	**Lille Airport**	Public
**Lille** / Marcq-en-Barœul	LFQO		Lille - Marcq-en-Baroeul Airport	Public
**Maubeuge** / Élesmes	LFQJ	XME	Maubeuge Aerodrome (UAF)	Public
**Merville** / Calonne-sur-la-Lys	LFQT	HZB	Merville–Calonne Airport	Public
**Valenciennes** / Denain	LFAV	XVS	Valenciennes-Denain Airport	Public
**60: Oise**
**Beauvais** / Tillé	LFOB	BVA	**Beauvais–Tillé Airport**	Public
**Compiègne** / Margny-lès-Compiègne	LFAD	XCP	Compiègne - Margny Airport	Public
**Creil**	LFPC	CSF	Creil Air Base (BA 110)	Military
**Le Plessis-Belleville**	LFPP		Plessis-Belleville Airport	Public
**61: Orne**
**Alençon** / Valframbert	LFOF	XAN	Alençon - Valframbert Aerodrome (WEB UAF)	Public
**Argentan**	LFAJ		Argentan Aerodrome (UAF)	Public
**Bagnoles-de-l'Orne** / Rives d'Andaine	LFAO		Bagnoles-de-l'Orne - Couterne Airport	Public
**Flers** / La Lande-Patry	LFOG		Flers - Saint-Paul Aerodrome (UAF)	Public
**L'Aigle** / Saint-Sulpice-sur-Risle	LFOL		L'Aigle - Saint-Michel Airport	Public
**Mortagne-au-Perche**/ Saint-Langis-lès-Mortagne & Saint-Hilaire-le-Châtel	LFAX		Mortagne Aerodrome (UAF)	Public
**62: Pas-de-Calais**
**Arras** / Roclincourt	LFQD		Arras – Roclincourt Airport	Public
**Berck**	LFAM		Berck-sur-Mer Airport	Public
**Calais** / Dunkirk	LFAC	CQF	Calais–Dunkerque Airport	Public
**Le Touquet**	LFAT	LTQ	Le Touquet – Côte d'Opale Airport	Public
**Lens** / Bénifontaine	LFQL	XLE	Lens - Bénifontaine Airport	Public
**Saint-Omer** / Wizernes	LFQN	XSG	Saint-Omer - Wizernes Airport	Public
**Vitry-en-Artois**	LFQS		Vitry-En-Artois Airport	Public
**63: Puy-de-Dôme**
**Ambert** / Le Poyet	LFHT		Ambert - Le Poyet Airport	Public
**Clermont-Ferrand** / Auvergne	LFLC	CFE	**Clermont-Ferrand Auvergne Airport**	Public
**Issoire** / Le Broc	LFHA		Issoire - Le Broc Airport	Public
**64: Pyrénées-Atlantiques**
**Biarritz**	LFBZ	BIQ	**Biarritz Pays Basque Airport**	Public
**Itxassou**	LFIX		Itxassou Aerodrome	Restricted
**Oloron-Sainte-Marie** / Herrère	LFCO		Oloron - Herrère Airport	Public
**Pau** / Uzein	LFBP	PUF	**Pau Pyrénées Airport**	Public
**65: Hautes-Pyrénées**
**Castelnau-Magnoac**	LFDQ		Castelnau-Magnoac Aerodrome	Restricted
**Col de Peyresourde** / Balestas	LFIP		Peyresourde - Balestas Aerodrome	Restricted
**Tarbes** / Laloubère	LFDT		Tarbes - Laloubère Airport	Public
**Tarbes** / Lourdes	LFBT	LDE	**Tarbes–Lourdes–Pyrénées Airport**	Public
**66: Pyrénées-Orientales**
**Mont-Louis** / La Quillane	LFNQ	QZE	Mont-Louis - La Quillane Aerodrome	Restricted
**Perpignan** / Rivesaltes	LFMP	PGF	**Perpignan–Rivesaltes Airport**	Public
**Sainte-Léocadie**	LFYS		Sainte-Léocadie Aerodrome	Restricted
**67: Bas-Rhin**
**Haguenau**	LFSH		Haguenau Airport	Public
**Sarre-Union**	LFQU		Sarre-Union Aerodrome	Restricted
**Saverne** / Steinbourg	LFQY		Saverne - Steinbourg Aerodrome	Restricted
**Strasbourg** / Entzheim	LFST	SXB	**Strasbourg Airport** (BA 124)	Public/mil.
**Strasbourg** / Neuhof	LFGC		Strasbourg - Neuhof Airport	Public
**68: Haut-Rhin**
**Mulhouse**	LFSB	MLH	**EuroAirport Basel Mulhouse Freiburg**	Public
**Colmar** / Houssen	LFGA	CMR	Colmar Airport	Public
**Colmar** / Meyenheim	LFSC		Quartier Colonel Dio (BA 132)	Military
**Mulhouse** / Habsheim	LFGB		Mulhouse–Habsheim Airport	Public
**69: Rhône**
**Belleville** / Villié-Morgon	LFHW		Belleville - Villié-Morgon Aerodrome	Restricted
**Lyon** / Brindas	LFKL		Lyon - Brindas Aerodrome	Restricted
**Lyon** / Bron	LFLY	LYN	Lyon–Bron Airport	Public
**Lyon** / Corbas	LFHJ		Lyon - Corbas Aerodrome	Restricted
**Lyon** / Colombier-Saugnieu	LFLL	LYS	**Lyon–Saint-Exupéry Airport**	Public
**Villefranche-sur-Saône** / Tarare	LFHV	XVF	Villefranche – Tarare Airport	Public
**70: Haute-Saône**
**Broye-Aubigney-Montseugny**	LFYH		Broyes-lès-Pesmes Airport	
**Gray**	LFEV		Gray - Saint-Adrien Airport	Public
**Lure** / Malbouhans	LFYL		Lure - Malbouhans Airport	
**Luxeuil-les-Bains** / Saint-Sauveur	LFSX		Luxeuil - Saint-Sauveur Air Base (BA 116)	Military
**Vesoul** / Frotey	LFQW		Vesoul - Frotey Airfield	Public
**71: Saône-et-Loire**
**Autun** / Bellevue	LFQF	XXG	Autun - Bellevue Aerodrome (UAF)	Public
**Chalon-sur-Saône** / Champforgeuil	LFLH	XCD	Chalon – Champforgeuil Airport	Public
**Mâcon** / Charnay-lès-Mâcon	LFLM	QNX	Mâcon - Charnay Airport (UAF)	Public
**Montceau-les-Mines** / Pouilloux	LFGM		Montceau-les-Mines - Pouilloux Airport	Public
**Paray-le-Monial**	LFGN		Paray-le-Monial Airport	Public
**Saint-Yan**	LFLN	SYT	Saint-Yan Airport	Public
**Tournus** / Cuisery	LFFX		Tournus - Cruisery Aerodrome	Restricted
**72: Sarthe**
**La Flèche** / Thorée-les-Pins	LFAL		La Flèche - Thorée-les-Pins Aerodrome	Restricted
**Le Mans** / Arnage	LFRM	LME	Le Mans - Arnage Aerodrome (UAF)	Public
**73: Savoie**
**Albertville**	LFKA	XAV	Albertville Aerodrome	Restricted
**Chambéry** / Challes-les-Eaux	LFLE		Chambéry Aerodrome	Public
**Chambéry** / Aix-les-Bains	LFLB	CMF	**Chambéry Airport**	Public
**Courchevel** / Saint-Bon-Tarentaise	LFLJ	CVF	Courchevel Altiport	Restricted
**Méribel**	LFKX	MFX	Méribel Altiport	Restricted
**Saint-Rémy-de-Maurienne**	LFKR		Saint-Rémy-de-Maurienne Aerodrome	Restricted
**Sollières-Sardières**	LFKD		Sollières-Sardières Aerodrome	Restricted
**74: Haute-Savoie**
**Annecy** / Meythet	LFLP	NCY	Annecy – Haute-Savoie – Mont Blanc Airport	Public
**Annemasse**	LFLI	QNJ	Annemasse Aerodrome	Public
**Megève**	LFHM	MVV	Megève Altiport	Restricted
**Sallanches**	LFHZ	XSN	Sallanches Aerodrome	Restricted
**75: Paris**
**Paris**	LFPI	JDP	Paris - Issy-les-Moulineaux Heliport (UAF)	
See **94: Val-De-Marne** for Orly airport See **95: Val d'Oise** for CDG airport
**76: Seine-Maritime**
**Dieppe** / Saint-Aubin-sur-Scie	LFAB	DPE	Dieppe - Saint-Aubin Airport (UAF)	Public
**Eu** / Mers-les-Bains / Le Tréport	LFAE		Eu - Mers - Le Tréport Aerodrome (UAF)	Restricted
**Le Havre** / Octeville-sur-Mer	LFOH	LEH	Le Havre – Octeville Airport	Public
**Le Havre** / Saint-Romain-de-Colbosc	LFOY		Le Havre - Saint-Romain Airport	Public
**Rouen**	LFOP	URO	Rouen Airport	Public
**Saint-Valery-en-Caux** / Vittefleur	LFOS		Saint-Valery - Vittefleur Airport	Public
**77: Seine-et-Marne**
**Chelles** / Le Pin	LFPH	XXY	Chelles - Le Pin Aerodrome (UAF)	Public
**Coulommiers** / Voisins	LFPK	XWA	Coulommiers – Voisins Aerodrome	Public
**Fontenay-Trésigny**	LFPQ		Fontenay-Trésigny Airport	Public
**La Ferté-Gaucher**	LFFG		La Ferté-Gaucher Aerodrome	Restricted
**Lognes** / Émerainville	LFPL	XLG	Lognes – Émerainville aerodrome (UAF)	Public
**Meaux** / Esbly	LFPE	XYB	Meaux - Esbly Aerodrome (UAF)	Public
**Melun**	LFPM		Melun Villaroche Aerodrome	Public
**Moret-sur-Loing** / Épisy	LFPU		Moret - Episy Aerodrome	Public
**Nangis** / Les Loges	LFAI		Nangis les Loges Aerodrome (UAF)	Public
**78: Yvelines**
**Beynes** / Thiverval	LFPF		Beynes - Thiverval Aerodrome	Restricted
**Chavenay** / Villepreux	LFPX	XZX	Aérodrome de Chavenay - Villepreux (UAF)	Public
**Les Mureaux**	LFXU		Les Mureaux Airport	Public
**Saint-Cyr-l'École**	LFPZ	XZB	Saint-Cyr-l'École Aerodrome (UAF)	Public
**Toussus-le-Noble**	LFPN	TNF	Toussus-le-Noble Airport	Public
**Vélizy-Villacoublay**	LFPV	VIY	Vélizy – Villacoublay Air Base (BA 107)	Military
**79: Deux-Sèvres**
**Mauléon**	LFJB		Mauléon Airport	Public
**Niort** / Souché	LFBN	NIT	Niort - Souché Airport (WEB UAF)	Public
**Thouars**	LFCT		Thouars Airport	Public
**80: Somme**
**Abbeville** / Buigny-Saint-Maclou	LFOI	XAB	Aerodrome Abbeville	Public
**Albert** / Bray-sur-Somme	LFAQ	BYF	Albert – Picardie Airport	Restricted
**Amiens** / Glisy	LFAY	QAM	Amiens – Glisy Aerodrome	Public
**Montdidier**	LFAR		Montdidier Aerodrome	Restricted
**Péronne** / Saint-Quentin	LFAG		Peronne-St Quentin Airport	Public
**81: Tarn**
**Albi** / Le Sequestre	LFCI	LBI	Albi - Le Sequestre Aerodrome (UAF)	Public
**Castres** / Mazamet	LFCK	DCM	**Castres–Mazamet Airport**	Public
**Gaillac** / Lisle-sur-Tarn	LFDG		Gaillac - Lisle-sur-Tarn Airport	Public
**Graulhet** / Montdragon	LFCQ		Graulhet - Montdragon Airport	Public
**82: Tarn-et-Garonne**
**Castelsarrasin** / Moissac	LFCX		Castelsarrazin - Moissac Airport	Public
**Montauban**	LFDB	XMW	Montauban Airport	Public
**83: Var**
**Cuers** / Pierrefeu	LFTF		Cuers - Pierrefeu Airport	Public
**Fayence**	LFMF		Fayence-Tourrettes Airfield	Public
**Saint-Tropez** / La Môle	LFTZ	LTT	**La Môle – Saint-Tropez Airport**	Restricted
**Le Castellet**	LFMQ	CTT	Le Castellet Airport	Private
**Le Luc** / Le Cannet	LFMC		Le Luc – Le Cannet Airport	Public
**Saint-Tropez** / Le Pilon	LFTT	JSZ	Saint-Tropez - Le Pilon Heliport	
**Toulon** / Hyères / Le Palyvestre	LFTH	TLN	**Toulon–Hyères Airport**	Public
**Vinon-sur-Verdon**	LFNF		Vinon Airport	Public
**84: Vaucluse**
**Avignon** / Caumont-sur-Durance	LFMV	AVN	Avignon – Provence Airport	Public
**Carpentras**	LFNH		Carpentras Airport	Public
**Orange** / Caritat	LFMO	XOG	Orange-Caritat Air Base (BA 115)	Military
**Pont-Saint-Esprit**	LFND		Pont-Saint-Esprit Airport	Public
**Saint-Christol**	LFXI		Saint-Christol Airport	
**Valréas** / Visan	LFNV		Valréas - Visan Airport	Public
**85: Vendée**
**Fontenay-le-Comte**	LFFK		Fontenay-le-Comte Airport	Public
**Île d'Yeu**	LFEY	IDY	Île d'Yeu Aerodrome	Public
**La Roche-sur-Yon** / Les Ajoncs	LFRI	EDM	La Roche-sur-Yon Aerodrome (UAF)	Public
**Les Sables-d'Olonne** / Talmont-Saint-Hilaire	LFOO	LSO	Les Sables-d'Olonne - Talmont Airport	Public
**Montaigu** / Saint-Georges-de-Montaigu	LFFW		Montaigu - Saint-Georges Airport	Public
**86: Vienne**
**Châtellerault** / Targe	LFCA	XCX	Châtellerault - Targe Airport	Public
**Chauvigny**	LFDW		Chauvigny Airport	Public
**Couhé** / Vérac	LFDV		Couhé - Vérac Airport	Public
**Loudun**	LFDL		Loudun Airport	Public
**Poitiers** / Biard	LFBI	PIS	**Poitiers–Biard Airport**	Public
**87: Haute-Vienne**
**Limoges** / Bellegarde	LFBL	LIG	**Limoges – Bellegarde Airport**	Public
**Saint-Junien**	LFBJ		Saint-Junien Maryse Bastié Airport	Public
**88: Vosges**
**Damblain**	LFYD		Damblain Airport	
**Épinal** / Dogneville	LFSE		Épinal - Dogneville Airport	Public
**Épinal** / Mirecourt	LFSG	EPL	Épinal – Mirecourt Airport	Public
**Neufchâteau**	LFFT		Neufchâteau Airport	Public
**Saint-Dié-des-Vosges** / Remomeix	LFGY	XTD	Saint-Dié - Remomeix Airport	Public
**Vittel** / Champ de Courses	LFSZ	VTL	Vittel - Champ-de-Courses Airport	
**Vittel** / Auzainvilliers	LFXC		Vittel - Auzainvilliers Airport (military)	
**89: Yonne**
**Auxerre** / Branches	LFLA	AUF	Auxerre – Branches Aerodrome	Public
**Avallon**	LFGE		Avallon Airport	Public
**Joigny**	LFGK		Joigny Airport	Public
**Pont-sur-Yonne**	LFGO		Pont-sur-Yonne Airport	Public
**Saint-Florentin** / Chéu	LFGP		Saint-Florentin - Chéu Airport	Public
**90: Territoire de Belfort**
**Belfort** / Chaux	LFGG		Belfort Chaux Airport	Public
**Belfort** / Fontaine	LFSQ	BOR	Belfort - Fontaine Aerodrome	
**91: Essonne**
**Brétigny-sur-Orge**	LFPY		Brétigny-sur-Orge Air Base (BA 217)	Military
**Buno-Bonnevaux**	LFFB		Buno-Bonnevaux Aerodrome	Restricted
**Étampes** / Mondésir	LFOX		Étampes - Mondésir Aerodrome (UAF)	Public
**Évry**		JEV	Évry Heliport	
**La Ferté-Alais**	LFFQ		La Ferté-Alais Aerodrome	Restricted
**92: Hauts-de-Seine**
**La Défense**		JPU	Paris - La Défense Heliport	
**93: Seine-Saint-Denis**
**Paris** / Le Bourget	LFPB	LBG	Paris–Le Bourget Airport	Public
**94: Val-de-Marne**
**Paris** / Athis-Mons / Chilly-Mazarin / Morangis / Orly / Paray-Vieille-Poste / Villeneuve-le-Roi / Wissous	LFPO	ORY	**Orly Airport**	Public
**95: Val-d'Oise**
**Enghien-les-Bains** / Moisselles	LFFE		Enghien Moisselles Airport	Restricted
**Mantes-la-Jolie** / Chérence	LFFC		Mantes - Chérence Aerodrome	Restricted
**Paris** / Épiais-lès-Louvres / Le Mesnil-Amelot / Mauregard / Mitry-Mory / Roissy-en-France / Tremblay-en-France	LFPG	CDG	**Charles de Gaulle Airport**	Public
**Persan** / Beaumont-sur-Oise	LFPA	XYP	Persan-Beaumont Airport	Public
**Pontoise** / Cormeilles-en-Vexin	LFPT	POX	Pontoise – Cormeilles Aerodrome	Public

== Airports in French territories ==
- List of airports in French Guiana
- List of airports in French Polynesia
- List of airports in Guadeloupe
- List of airports in Martinique
- List of airports in Mayotte
- List of airports in New Caledonia
- List of airports in Réunion
- List of airports in Saint Barthélemy
- List of airports in Saint Martin
- List of airports in Saint Pierre and Miquelon
- List of airports in Wallis and Futuna

== See also ==
- List of the busiest airports in France
- List of French Air Force bases
- List of airports by ICAO code: L#LF – France
- Wikipedia:WikiProject Aviation/Airline destination lists: Europe#France
