= L'Union des Aéroports Français =

L'Union des Aéroports Français (UAF) - "The French Airports Association" in English - is a French organization created in 1938. As of March 2010, it has 134 members which operate 156 airports in metropolitan France and the French overseas departments and territories. In November 2018, Union des Aéroports Francophones (UAF) merged with Les Aéroports Francophones Associés à l'ACI (AFACI) into UAF&FA.

== Member airports ==
UAF members operate the following airports (as of March 2010).

1. Abbeville–Buigny-Saint-Maclou Aerodrome
2. Agen–La Garenne Aerodrome
3. Aix-en-Provence Aerodrome
4. Ajaccio Napoleon Bonaparte Airport
5. Albert–Picardie Airport
6. Albi–Le Séquestre Aerodrome
7. Amiens–Glisy Aerodrome
8. Ancenis Aerodrome
9. Angers–Loire Airport
10. Angoulême–Brie–Champniers Airport
11. Annecy–Haute-Savoie–Mont Blanc Airport
12. Argentan Aerodrome
13. Arras–Roclincourt Airport
14. Aubenas Aerodrome
15. Auch–Lamothe Airport
16. Aurillac Airport
17. Autun–Bellevue Aerodrome
18. Auxerre–Branches Aerodrome
19. Avignon–Caumont Airport
20. Avignon–Pujaut Aerodrome
21. Bâle–Mulhouse Airport
22. Bastia–Poretta Airport
23. Beauvais–Tillé Airport
24. Belle-Ile-en-Mer Aerodrome
25. Bergerac Dordogne Périgord Airport
26. Berre–La Fare Aerodrome
27. Besançon–La Vèze Aerodrome
28. Béziers Cap d'Agde Airport
29. Biarritz–Anglet–Bayonne Airport
30. Blois–Le Breuil Airport
31. Bora Bora Airport
32. Bordeaux–Mérignac Airport
33. Bourges Airport
34. Brest Bretagne Airport
35. Caen–Carpiquet Airport
36. Calais–Dunkerque Airport
37. Calvi–Sainte-Catherine Airport
38. Cannes–Mandelieu Airport
39. Cannes Quai du Large Heliport
40. Carcassonne Airport
41. Castres–Mazamet Airport
42. Cayenne–Rochambeau Airport
43. Chalon–Champforgeuil Airfield
44. Chambéry–Savoie Airport
45. Chartres–Champhol Aerodrome
46. Château-Arnoux-Saint-Auban Airport
47. Châteauroux–Centre Airport
48. Chaumont–Semoutiers Airport
49. Chavenay–Villepreux Aerodrome
50. Chelles–Le Pin Aerodrome
51. Cherbourg–Maupertus Airport
52. Cholet–Le Pontreau Aerodrome
53. Clermont-Ferrand Auvergne Airport
54. Cognac–Châteaubernard Airport
55. Colmar–Houssen Airport
56. Coulommiers–Voisins Aerodrome
57. Deauville–Saint-Gatien Airport
58. Dieppe–Saint-Aubin Airport
59. Dijon–Bourgogne Airport
60. Dinard–Pleurtuit–Saint-Malo Airport
61. Dole–Jura Airport
62. Épinal–Mirecourt Airport
63. Étampes–Mondésir Aerodrome
64. Figari–Sud Corse Airport
65. Flers–Saint-Paul Aerodrome
66. Granville–Mont Saint-Michel Aerodrome
67. Grenoble-Isère Airport
68. Guadeloupe–Pôle Caraïbes Airport
69. Huahine–Fare Airport
70. Ile d'Yeu–Grand Phare Aerodrome
71. La Baule–Pornichet–Le Pouliguen Airport
72. La Môle–Saint-Tropez Airport
73. La Réunion–Roland Garros Airport
74. La Roche sur Yon–René Couzinet Aerodrome
75. La Rochelle–Île de Ré Airport
76. Lannion–Côte de Granit Airport
77. Laval–Entrammes Airport
78. Le Havre–Octeville Airport
79. Le Mans–Arnage Aerodrome
80. Le Mazet de Romanin Aerodrome
81. Le Puy–Loudes Airport
82. Le Touquet–Côte d'Opale Airport
83. Lille Airport
84. Limoges–Bellegarde Airport
85. Lognes–Emerainville Aerodrome
86. Lorient South Brittany Airport
87. Lyon–Bron Airport
88. Lyon–Saint-Exupéry Airport
89. Mâcon–Charnay Airport
90. Marseille Provence Airport
91. Martinique Aimé Césaire International Airport
92. Maubeuge Aerodrome
93. Meaux–Esbly Aerodrome
94. Megève Altiport
95. Melun Villaroche Aerodrome
96. Merville–Calonne Airport
97. Metz–Nancy–Lorraine Airport
98. Montargis–Vimory Aerodrome
99. Montbéliard–Courcelles Aerodrome
100. Montluçon–Guéret Airport
101. Montpellier–Méditerranée Airport
102. Moorea Airport
103. Morlaix–Ploujean Airport
104. Mortagne Aerodrome
105. Moulins–Montbeugny Airport
106. Nancy-Essey Airport
107. Nangis les Loges Aerodrome
108. Nantes Atlantique Airport
109. Nevers–Fourchambault Airport
110. Nice Côte d'Azur Airport
111. Nîmes–Alès–Camargue–Cévennes Airport
112. Nouméa–La Tontouta Airport
113. Orléans–Saint-Denis-de-l'Hôtel Airport
114. Paris–Issy-les-Moulineaux Heliport
115. Paris–Le Bourget Airport
116. Paris-Orly Airport
117. Paris-Charles de Gaulle Airport
118. Paris Vatry Airport
119. Pau Pyrénées Airport
120. Peronne-St Quentin Airfield
121. Perpignan–Rivesaltes Airport
122. Persan-Beaumont Airport
123. Poitiers–Biard Airport
124. Pontoise–Cormeilles Aerodrome
125. Quiberon Aerodrome
126. Quimper–Cornouaille Airport
127. Raiatea Airport
128. Rangiroa Airport
129. Redon–Bains-sur-Oust Aerodrome
130. Reims–Prunay Aerodrome
131. Rennes–Saint-Jacques Airport
132. Roanne–Renaison Airport
133. Rochefort–Saint-Agnant Airport
134. Rodez-Marcillac Airport
135. Rouen–Vallée de Seine Airport
136. Royan–Médis Aerodrome
137. Saint-Brieuc–Armor Airport
138. Saint-Cyr-l'Ecole Aerodrome
139. Saint-Étienne–Bouthéon Airport
140. Saint-Martin Grand Case Airport
141. Saint-Nazaire–Montoir Airport
142. Saint-Pierre–Pierrefonds Airport
143. Saint-Yan Airport
144. Saumur–Saint-Hilaire–Saint-Florent Aerodrome
145. Strasbourg Airport
146. Tahiti–Faaʻa Airport
147. Tarbes–Lourdes–Pyrénées Airport
148. Toulon–Hyères Airport
149. Toulouse–Blagnac Airport
150. Toulouse–Lasbordes Airport
151. Tours Val de Loire Airport
152. Toussus-le-Noble Airport
153. Troyes–Barberey Airport
154. Valence-Chabeuil Airport
155. Valenciennes-Denain Airport
156. Vannes–Golfe du Morbihan Airport

== See also ==
- List of airports in France
- List of airports in French Guiana
- List of airports in French Polynesia
- List of airports in Guadeloupe
- List of airports in Martinique
- List of airports in Mayotte
- List of airports in New Caledonia
- List of airports in Réunion
- List of airports in Saint Barthélemy
- List of airports in Saint Martin
- List of airports in Saint Pierre and Miquelon
- List of airports in Wallis and Futuna
