= Montbéliard – Courcelles Aerodrome =

Montbéliard - Courcelles Aerodrome Aérodrome de Montbéliard - Courcelles
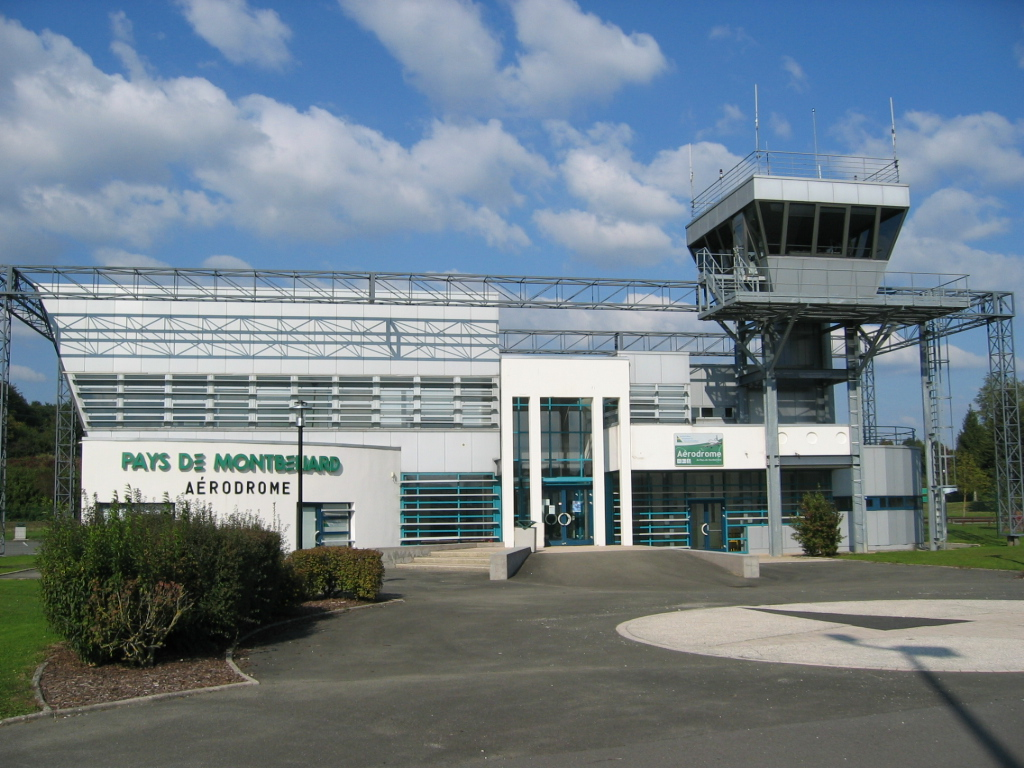
- IATA: XMF; ICAO: LFSM

Summary
- Airport type: Public
- Operator: Syndicat mixte de l’aérodrome de Montbéliard
- Serves: Montbéliard, Doubs, France
- Location: Courcelles-lès-Montbéliard
- Elevation AMSL: 1,041 ft / 317 m
- Coordinates: 47°29′12″N 006°47′29″E

Map
- Location of airport in France

Runways
Direction	Length		Surface
Direction	m	ft	Surface
08/26	1,700	5,577	Paved
08/26	860	2,822	Grass
- Sources: French AIP, UAF, DAFIF

Montbéliard – Courcelles Aerodrome (French: Aérodrome de Montbéliard - Courcelles) (IATA: XMF, ICAO: LFSM) is an airport serving Montbéliard, a commune in the Doubs department in the Franche-Comté region in eastern France.

The airport is located 2 km (1.1 NM) south of Montbéliard, near Courcelles-lès-Montbéliard.

== Facilities ==
The airport resides at an elevation of 1,041 feet (317 m) above mean sea level. It has one paved runway designated 08/26 with a bituminous surface measuring 1,700 by 20 metres (5,577 ft × 66 ft). It also has a parallel grass runway which measures 860 by 50 metres (2,822 ft × 164 ft).
