= VAF =

VAF may stand for:

- Valence-Chabeuil Airport, a French airport
- Variety Artistes' Federation, a former British trade union
- Volunteer Army Foundation, a New Zealand student movement
