= List of airports in Mayotte =

This is a list of airports in Mayotte, sorted by location.

Mayotte is an overseas department of France at the northern end of the Mozambique Channel in the Indian Ocean, between northern Madagascar and northern Mozambique. It is geographically part of the Comoro Islands.

== Airports ==
ICAO location identifiers are linked to each airport's Aeronautical Information Publication (AIP), which are available online in Portable Document Format (PDF) from the French Service d'information aéronautique (SIA). Locations shown in bold are as per the airport's AIP page. Most airports give two locations: the first is the city served, second is the city where the airport is located.

Airport names shown in bold indicate the airport has scheduled service on commercial airlines.

City served / Location	ICAO	IATA	Airport name	Usage
**Dzaoudzi** / Pamandzi	FMCZ	DZA	**Dzaoudzi Pamandzi International Airport**	Public

== See also ==
- List of airports in France
- List of airports by ICAO code: F#FM - Comoros, Mayotte, Réunion, and Madagascar
- Wikipedia: Airline destination lists: Africa#Mayotte (France)
