= List of airports in Réunion =

This is a list of airports in Réunion, sorted by location.

Réunion (French: La Réunion) is an island and overseas department (département d'outre-mer, or DOM) of France, located in the Indian Ocean east of Madagascar, about 200 km southwest of Mauritius, the nearest island.

== Airports ==
ICAO location identifiers are linked to each airport's Aeronautical Information Publication (AIP), which are available online in Portable Document Format (PDF) from the French Service d'information aéronautique (SIA). Locations shown in bold are as per the airport's AIP page. Most airports give two locations: the first is the city served, second is the city where the airport is located.

Airport names shown in bold indicate the airport has scheduled service on commercial airlines.

Location	ICAO	IATA	Airport name	Usage
Saint-Denis / **Gillot**	FMEE	RUN	**Roland Garros Airport** (Gillot Airport)	Public
Saint-Pierre / **Pierrefonds**	FMEP	ZSE	**Pierrefonds Airport**	Public

== See also ==
- List of airports in France
- List of airports by ICAO code: F#FM - Comoros, Mayotte, Réunion, and Madagascar
- Wikipedia: Airline destination lists: Africa#Réunion (France)
