= Arras – Roclincourt Airfield =

Arras - Roclincourt Airfield Aérodrome d'Arras - Roclincourt
- IATA: none; ICAO: LFQD

Summary
- Airport type: Public
- Operator: CCI d'Arras
- Serves: Arras
- Location: Roclincourt, France
- Elevation AMSL: 337 ft / 103 m
- Coordinates: 50°19′26″N 002°48′10″E

Map
- Location of airport in France

Runways
Direction	Length		Surface
Direction	m	ft	Surface
05/23	1,025	3,363	Grass
- Sources: French AIP, UAF

Arras – Roclincourt Airfield (French: Aérodrome d'Arras - Roclincourt) (ICAO: LFQD) is a recreational aerodrome located in Roclincourt, 4 km (2.2 NM) northeast of Arras, both communes of the Pas-de-Calais department in the Hauts-de-France region of France.

== Facilities ==
The field resides at an elevation of 337 feet (103 m) above mean sea level. It has one runway designated 05/23 with a grass surface measuring 1,025 by 60 metres (3,363 ft × 197 ft).
