= Orléans–Saint-Denis-de-l'Hôtel Airport =

Orléans–Saint-Denis-de-l'Hôtel Airport Aéroport du Loiret–Orléans–Saint-Denis-de-l'Hôtel
- IATA: ORE; ICAO: LFOZ

Summary
- Airport type: Public
- Owner: SMAEDAOL (Syndicat mixte pour l'aménagement et l'exploitation de la desserte aérienne de l'Ouest du Loiret)
- Serves: Orléans, France
- Location: Saint-Denis-de-l'Hôtel
- Elevation AMSL: 396 ft / 121 m
- Coordinates: 47°53′51″N 002°09′51″E

Maps
- Location of Centre-Val de Loire region in France

- Location of airport in Centre-Val de Loire region

Runways
Direction	Length		Surface
Direction	m	ft	Surface
05/23	1,392	4,567	Asphalt
05R/23L	1,060	3,478	Grass
- Source: French AIP

Orléans–Saint-Denis-de-l'Hôtel Airport (IATA: ORE, ICAO: LFOZ) is a French airport located in the Saint-Denis-de-l'Hôtel commune in the Loiret département, Centre-Val de Loire region, France

== Geography ==
The airport is on the northern part of the commune of Saint-Denis-de-l'Hôtel, in the Loire Valley, north of the Loire river and south of the Orléans forest. It is located on the Zone des Quatre-Vents, at the end of the rue de l'industrie, 5.5 kilometres (3.4 mi) north of Jargeau, 22 km (14 miles) east of Orléans, 49 km (30 miles) west of Montargis and 117 km (73 miles) south of Paris. The access by the Tangentielle d'Orléans (Route nationale 60) is via exit #13 (ST Denis de L'H; Jargeau; Fay aux Loges; AERODROME), towards route départementale 921.

Nearest SNCF railway stations: Orléans and Les Aubrais-Orléans.

== Facilities ==
The airport is situated at an elevation of 396 feet (121 m) above mean sea level. It has two runways: 05/23 with an asphalt surface measuring 1,392 by 30 metres (4,567 ft × 98 ft) and a parallel grass runway measuring 1,060 by 80 metres (3,478 ft × 262 ft). The paved runway has lighting (HI - PAPI - feux à éclats EN 23). The terminal is 150 square metres (1,615 sq ft) in size and the aircraft hangar area is 8,930 square metres (96,122 sq ft).

== Activities ==
The airport essentially serves business aircraft and freight, though tourist aviation also contributes a significant part of the traffic. In 2007, 4,900 passengers were lifted, and 13,300 kilograms (29,321 lb) of postal parcels were sent. Associations practising skydiving, model aircraft and gliding are also on site. An OPALE weather station is also there. A new Helicopter Airline company is now available on the airfield. Helisphere. Also a Luxury Inflight Catering Company, Oz Operations, is now based on LFOZ airport.

== See also ==
- List of airports in France
