= Auxerre–Branches Aerodrome =

Auxerre–Branches Aerodrome Aérodrome d'Auxerre–Branches
- IATA: AUF; ICAO: LFLA

Summary
- Airport type: Public
- Operator: CCI de l'Yonne
- Serves: Auxerre / Branches, Yonne, France
- Elevation AMSL: 523 ft (159 m)
- Coordinates: 47°50′47″N 003°29′48″E
- Website: http://www.auxerre.aeroport.fr

Map
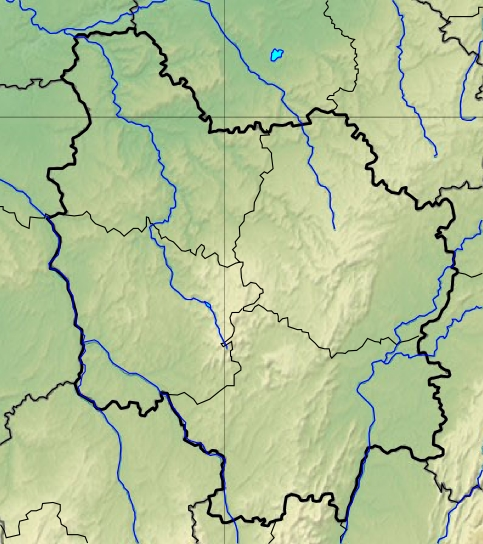
- Location of airfield in Burgundy region Location of Burgundy region in France

Runways
Direction	Length		Surface
Direction	m	ft	Surface
01/19	1,650	5,413	Asphalt
- Sources: French AIP, UAF, DAFIF

Auxerre–Branches Aerodrome (French: Aérodrome d'Auxerre–Branches) (IATA: AUF, ICAO: LFLA) is an airport serving Auxerre and Branches, both communes of the Yonne department in the Bourgogne region of France. The airport is located 8.5 km (4.6 NM) northwest of Auxerre and approximately 4 km (2.2 NM) southeast of Branches.

== Facilities ==
The airport resides at an elevation of 523 feet (159 m) above mean sea level. It has one runway designated 01/19 with an asphalt surface measuring 1,650 by 30 metres (5,413 ft × 98 ft).
