= Reims – Prunay Aerodrome =

Airport in France

Reims – Prunay Aerodrome Aérodrome de Reims - Prunay
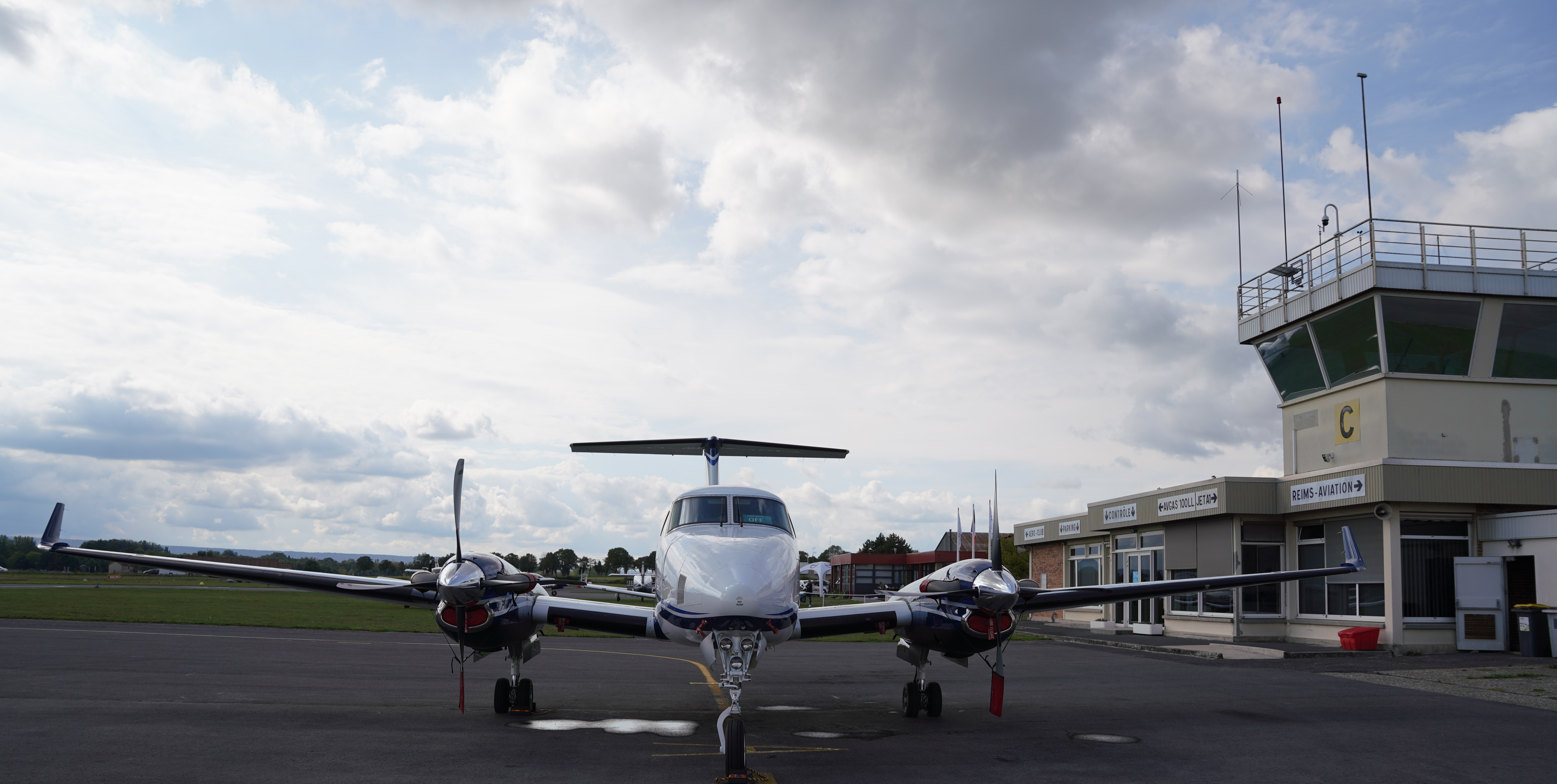
- IATA: none; ICAO: LFQA

Summary
- Airport type: Public
- Operator: CCI Reims
- Serves: Reims
- Location: Prunay, France
- Elevation AMSL: 313 ft (95 m)
- Coordinates: 49°12′31″N 004°09′24″E
- Website: http://reims.aeroport.fr

Map
- Location of airport in France

Runways
Direction	Length		Surface
Direction	m	ft	Surface
07/25	1,150	3,773	Asphalt
07R/25L	1,170	3,786	Grass
- Sources: French AIP, UAF, DAFIF

Reims – Prunay Aerodrome (French: Aérodrome de Reims - Prunay) (ICAO: LFQA) is an airfield serving the city of Reims. It is located 10 km (5.4 NM) east-southeast of Reims, near Prunay, both communes in the Marne department in the Grand Est region in northeastern France.

It is a class D aerodrome open to general aviation traffic with no commercial airline service scheduled. Also, it hosts the factory of Reims Aviation.

== Facilities ==
The airport resides at an elevation of 313 feet (95 m) above mean sea level. It has one paved runway designated 07/25 which measures 1,150 by 30 metres (3,773 ft × 98 ft). It also has a parallel unpaved runway measuring 1,170 by 80 metres (3,839 ft × 262 ft).
