= Saint-Nazaire Montoir Airport =

Saint-Nazaire Montoir Airport Aéroport de Saint-Nazaire - Montoir
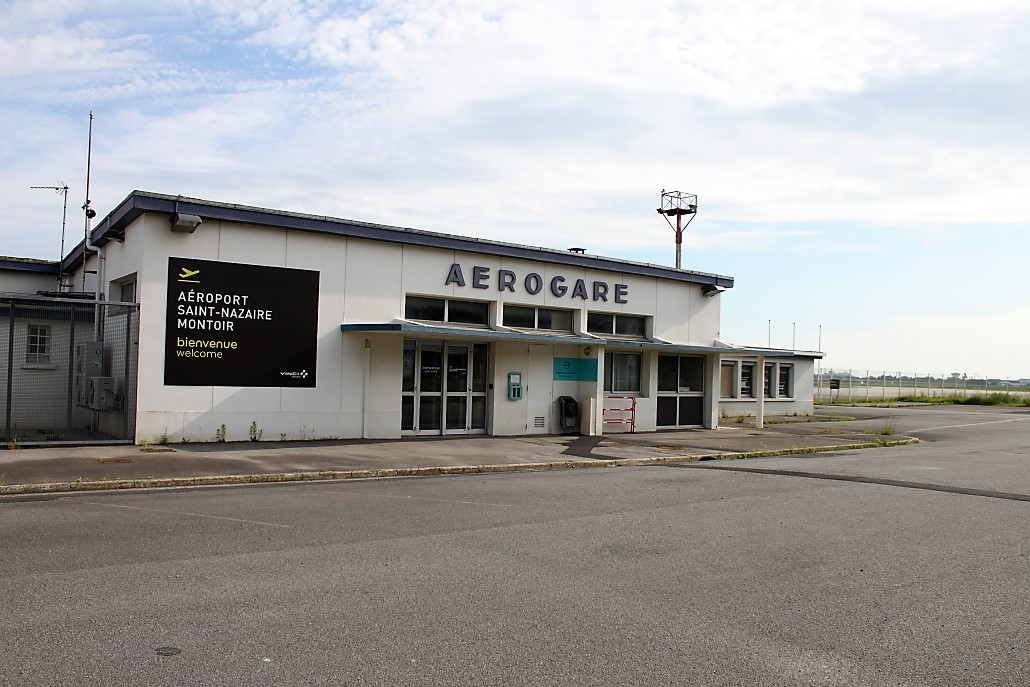
- IATA: SNR; ICAO: LFRZ

Summary
- Airport type: Public
- Owner/Operator: Vinci Airports
- Serves: Saint-Nazaire, France
- Location: Loire-Atlantique, France
- Elevation AMSL: 13 ft (4.0 m)
- Coordinates: 47°18′38″N 02°09′24″W

Maps
- The Pays de la Loire region within France

- Location of the airport in Pays de la Loire

Runways
Direction	Length		Surface
Direction	m	ft	Surface
07/25	2,400	7,874	Asphalt

Saint-Nazaire Montoir Airport (In French: Aéroport de Saint-Nazaire Montoir) (IATA: SNR, ICAO: LFRZ) also referred to as Aéroport de Gron is a primary commercial airport that serves Saint-Nazaire. It is owned and operated by Vinci Airports which purchased the airport from the city in 2005.

== Facilities ==
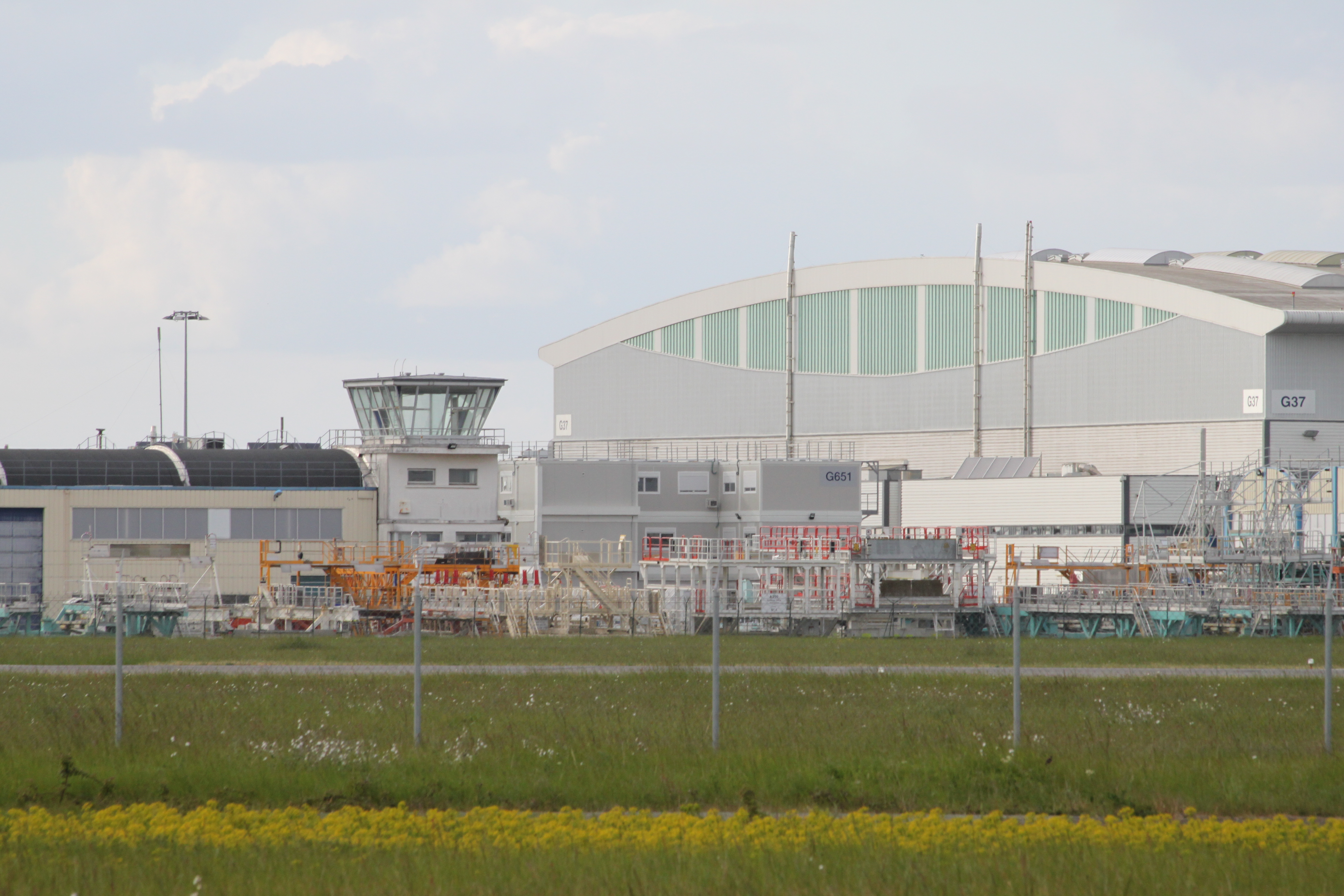
Control tower and Airbus hangar at the airport

SNR is located just north of the Loire river. The airport has a terminal building of about 800 square feet (74 m^{2}) and can handle 90 passengers at a time. The airport has one asphalt runway 07/25 which is 7,874 feet (2,400 m) long. The airports' aircraft parking area is 178,000 square feet (16,500 m^{2}) and can handle five Boeing 737s at a time. The airport is also home to SkyTraining Flight School and Aviation Center which is located on the other side of the passenger terminal.

== Operations ==
The airport operates scheduled passenger flights with Air France operated by HOP! using ATR 42 aircraft as well as scheduled cargo flights by Airbus Transport International. The airport is home to aircraft manufacturer Airbus which produces aircraft parts on premises and then ships them to Toulouse and other locations for assembly. Airbus also uses the airport for testing aircraft, which happens multiple times monthly. The airport is able to handle aircraft as large as an Airbus A380. In the early 2000s, Airbus made significant airport upgrades with A380 testing in mind. Other aircraft tested at SNR are A350s, A330s and A320s/A319s/A321s.

== Airlines and destinations ==
The following airlines operate regular charter flights at Saint-Nazaire Montoir Airport on behalf of Airbus:

Airlines	Destinations
Air Corsica	Corporate charter: Toulouse
Air France Hop	Corporate charter: Nantes, Toulouse

== Statistics ==
Annual Passengers
Year	Change	Passengers
2013	▼0.3%	22,100
2014	▼1.8%	21,700
2015	▼0.9%	21,500
2016	0.0%	21,500
2017	▲2.3%	22,000

Annual Aircraft Movements
Year	Change	Movement
2013	▼3.7%	1,865
2014	▼3.2%	1,815
2015	▲1.6%	1,845
2016	▲9.7%	2,027
2017	TBA	TBA

Annual Freight (Tons)
Year	Change	Freight (Tons)
2013	▲3.9%	20,000
2014	0.0%	20,000
2015	▲7.5%	21,500
2016	▲14.0%	25,000
2017	TBA	TBA

== See also ==
- List of airports in France
- Transport in France
