= Albert–Picardie Airport =

Albert–Picardie Airport Aéroport d'Albert–Picardie
- IATA: BYF; ICAO: LFAQ

Summary
- Airport type: Public
- Operator: Société d’Exploitation Aéroport Albert Picardie (SEAAP)
- Serves: Albert, Somme, France
- Location: Bray-sur-Somme
- Elevation AMSL: 363 ft / 111 m
- Coordinates: 49°58′12″N 002°41′33″E
- Website: www.aeroportalbertpicardie.com

Map
- Location of airport in France

Runways
Direction	Length		Surface
Direction	m	ft	Surface
09/27	2,200	7,218	Macadam
09R/27L	1,000	3,281	Grass
- Sources: French AIP, UAF

Albert–Picardie Airport (French: Aéroport d'Albert–Picardie) (IATA: BYF, ICAO: LFAQ), sometimes referred to as Albert–Picardy Airport, is an airport serving Albert, a commune of the Somme department in the Picardy (Picardie) region of northern France. The airport is located 4 km (2 mi) southeast of Albert, in Bray-sur-Somme.

It is primarily used for the transportation of Airbus aircraft parts from the company's factory at Méaulte nearby. The airport's runway is large enough to accommodate Airbus' Beluga, a large cargo aircraft used to courier parts used in the construction of its own commercial jets.

The airport is also home to a flying club, which has a number of light aircraft based at the airfield; and to a society engaging in historic aircraft.

The British low-cost carrier Jet2.com announced and then cancelled a twice-weekly service to the Somme using this airport; flights were to start in April 2009.

On 28 January 2012, plans were unveiled to launch a twice-weekly service to Blackpool International Airport with Danish Air Transport using ATR 72s, however before the flights started, the route was cancelled.

At the end of 2013, a service to Toulouse, Dole and Nice was introduced under the "IGAvion" brand. The flights were operated by Skytaxi with Saab 340 aircraft.

== History ==
The aerodrome was first created to serve the aircraft factory of Henry Potez, around 1924. The factory (a short distance from the current airport) was later merged, successively, into SNCAN, Nord Aviation, Aerospatiale, and finally Airbus.

== Facilities ==
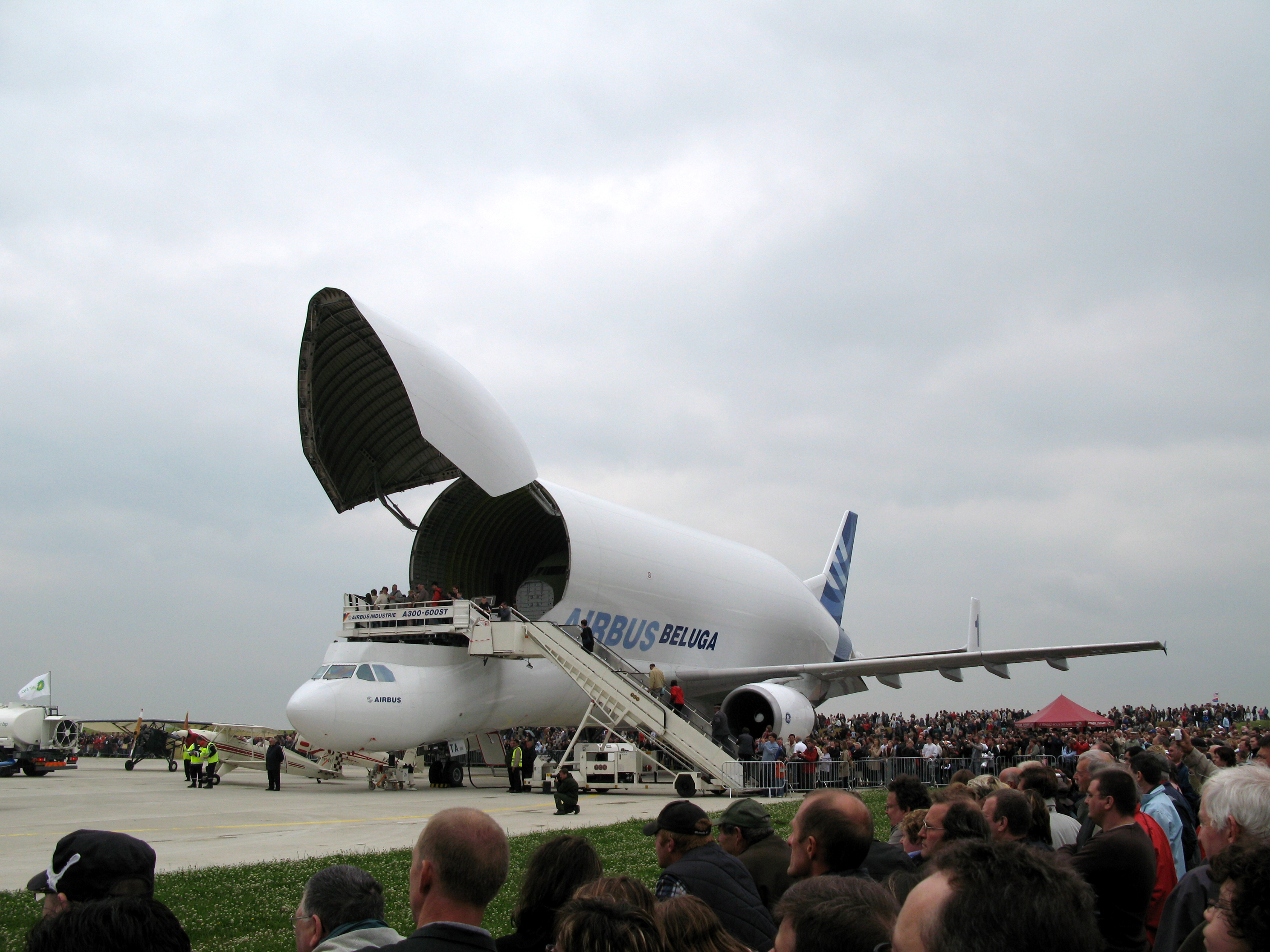
Airbus Beluga at Albert–Picardie (2008)

The airport resides at an elevation of 364 feet (111 m) above mean sea level. It has one paved runway designated 09/27 which measures 2,200 by 45 metres (7,218 ft × 148 ft). It also has a parallel unpaved runway with a grass surface measuring 1,000 by 80 metres (3,281 ft × 262 ft).; it is mainly used by the local glider club.
