= Bourges Airport =

French airport

Bourges Airport Aéroport de Bourges
- IATA: BOU; ICAO: LFLD

Summary
- Airport type: Public
- Operator: CCI du Cher
- Serves: Bourges, France
- Elevation AMSL: 529 ft / 161 m
- Coordinates: 47°03′39″N 002°22′12″E

Maps
- Location of Centre-Val de Loire region in France

- Location of airport in Centre-Val de Loire region

Runways
Direction	Length		Surface
Direction	m	ft	Surface
06/24	1,550	5,085	Asphalt
06/24	915	3,002	Grass
- Sources: French AIP, UAF, DAFIF

Bourges Airport (French: Aéroport de Bourges) (IATA: BOU, ICAO: LFLD) is an airport serving Bourges, a commune in the Cher department of the Centre-Val de Loire region of France. It is located 3 km (1.6 NM) southwest of Bourges.

== Facilities ==
Bourges Airport resides at an elevation of 529 feet (161 m) above mean sea level. It has an asphalt paved runway designated 06/24 which measures 1,550 by 45 metres (5,085 ft × 148 ft) and a parallel grass runway measuring 915 by 60 metres (3,002 ft × 197 ft).
