= Megève Altiport =

Megève Altiport Altiport de Megève
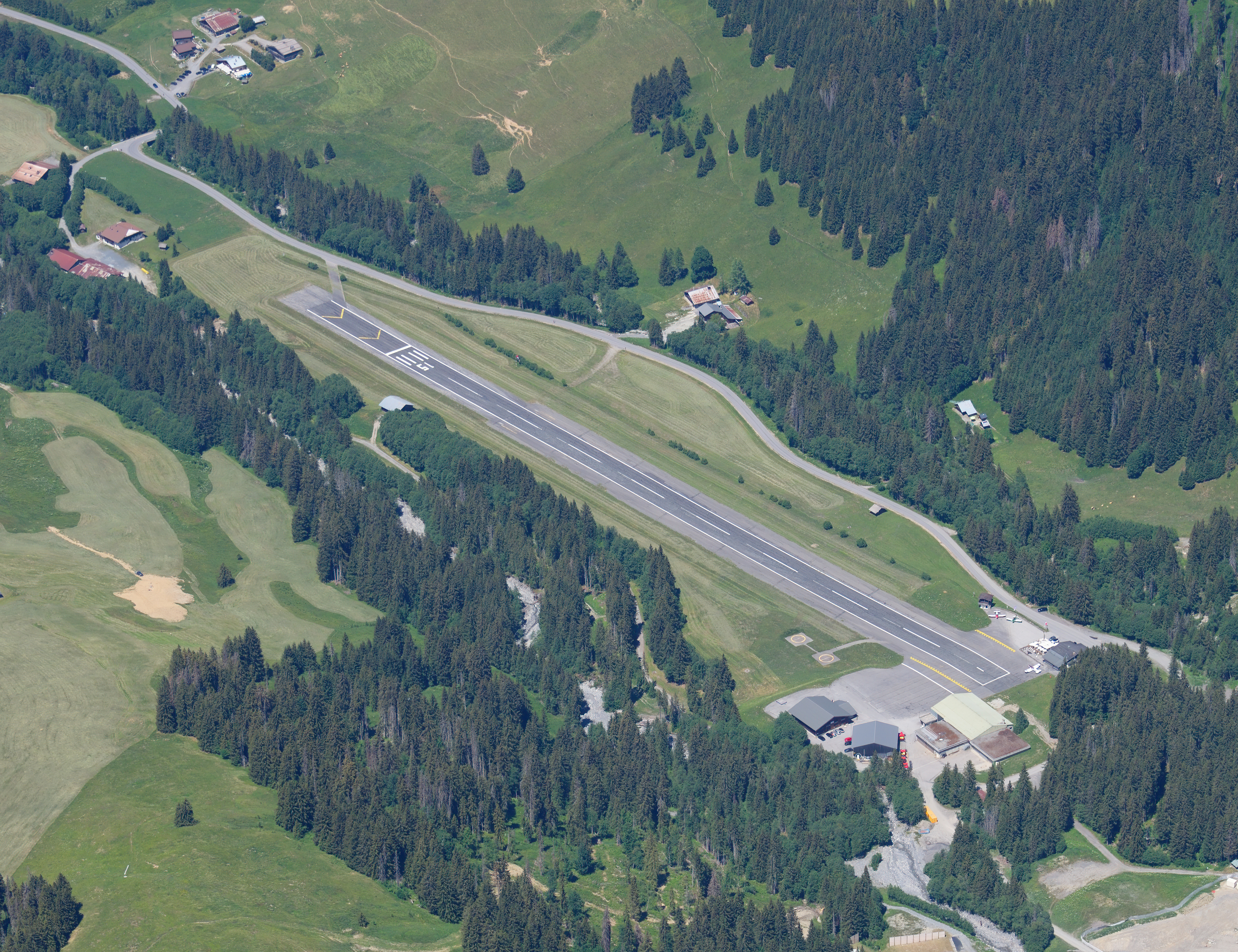
- IATA: MVV; ICAO: LFHM

Summary
- Airport type: Public
- Serves: Megève, France
- Elevation AMSL: 4,830 ft (1,470 m)
- Coordinates: 45°49′25″N 006°38′57″E

Map
- Location of airport in France

Runways
Direction	Length		Surface
Direction	m	ft	Surface
15/33	434	1,424	Paved
- Sources: French AIP, UAF

Megève Altiport (French: Altiport de Megève, IATA: MVV, ICAO: LFHM) is an altiport 5 km (3 miles) southeast of Megève, a commune in the Haute-Savoie department of the Rhône-Alpes region in eastern France.

== Facilities ==
The airport is at an elevation of 4,830 feet (1,472 m) above mean sea level. It has one runway designated 15/33 with a paved surface measuring 434 by 18 metres (1,424 ft × 59 ft).
