= Le Havre–Octeville Airport =

Airport serving the city of Le Havre in France

Le Havre–Octeville Airport Aéroport Le Havre–Octeville Advanced Landing Ground (ALG) Y-30
- IATA: LEH; ICAO: LFOH

Summary
- Airport type: Public
- Operator: SNC-Lavalin Aéroports
- Serves: Le Havre
- Location: Octeville-sur-Mer, Seine-Maritime, France
- Elevation AMSL: 312 ft (95 m)
- Coordinates: 49°32′02″N 00°05′17″E
- Website: www.lehavre.aeroport.fr

Map
- Location of airport in Normandy region

Runways
Direction	Length		Surface
Direction	m	ft	Surface
04/22	2,300	7,546	Asphalt
- Sources: French AIP, UAF, DAFIF

Le Havre–Octeville Airport (French: Aéroport Le Havre–Octeville) (IATA: LEH, ICAO: LFOH) is an airport serving the city of Le Havre in France. The airport is located in Octeville-sur-Mer, 5 km (3 NM) north-northwest of Le Havre, both communes in the Seine-Maritime department in the Normandy region in northern France.

== Facilities ==
The airport resides at an elevation of 312 feet (95 m) above mean sea level. It has one paved runway designated 05/23 which measures 2,300 by 40 metres (7,546 ft × 131 ft).

== Airlines and destinations ==
After Twin Jet left the airport, there have been no scheduled services to or from Le Havre. Nevertheless, there are irregular charter flights taking place to holiday destinations in Southern Europe, e.g. Larnaca in Cyprus or Porto in Portugal.
