= List of airports in Saint Barthélemy =

A list of airports in Saint Barthélemy, sorted by location.

Saint Barthélemy (French: Saint-Barthélemy) is an island in the eastern Caribbean Sea. Also known as Saint Barts, Saint Barths, or Saint Barth, it is one of four Leeward Islands that comprise the French West Indies. It became an overseas collectivity (collectivité d'outre-mer or COM) of France on February 22, 2007. Previously it was a French commune of Guadeloupe, which is an overseas region (région d'outre-mer) and overseas department (département d'outre-mer or DOM) of France.

ICAO location identifiers are linked to the airport's Aeronautical Information Publication (AIP), which is available online in Portable Document Format (PDF) from the French Service d'information aéronautique (SIA).

== List ==
Location	ICAO	IATA	Airport name	Usage	Coordinates
St. Jean, Saint Barthélemy	TFFJ	SBH	Gustaf III Airport (or Saint Barthélemy Airport)	Restricted	17°54′16″N 062°50′38″W

== See also ==
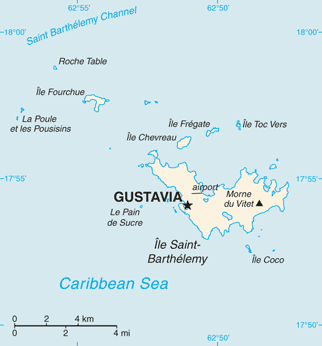
Map of Saint Barthélemy with location of airport

- List of airports by ICAO code: T#Saint Barthélemy
- List of airports in France
- Wikipedia: Airline destination lists: North America#Saint Barthélemy (France)
