= Montluçon–Guéret Airport =

Montluçon–Guéret Airport Aéroport de Montluçon–Guéret
- IATA: MCU; ICAO: LFBK

Summary
- Airport type: Public
- Operator: CCI de Montluçon Gannat
- Serves: Montluçon / Guéret
- Location: Lépaud, Creuse, France
- Elevation AMSL: 1,367 ft / 417 m
- Coordinates: 46°13′34″N 002°21′46″E

Map
- Location of airport in the Nouvelle-Aquitaine region

Runways
Direction	Length		Surface
Direction	m	ft	Surface
17/35	1,900	6,234	Asphalt
17R/35L	1,000	3,281	Grass
- Sources: French AIP, UAF, World Aero Data

Montluçon–Guéret Airport (French: Aéroport de Montluçon–Guéret) (IATA: MCU, ICAO: LFBK) is an airport in Lépaud, a commune in the Creuse department of the Nouvelle-Aquitaine region of France. The airport is located 22.5 km (14 mi) southwest of Montluçon in the Allier department and 45 km (28 mi) east of Guéret in the Creuse department.

In August 2021, the airport hosted three classes of the World Gliding Championships

== Facilities ==
The airport is at an elevation of 1,367 feet (417 m) above mean sea level. It has one paved runway designated 17/35 with an asphalt surface measuring 1,900 by 45 metres (6,234 ft × 148 ft). It also has a parallel unpaved runway with a grass surface measuring 1,000 by 80 metres (3,281 ft × 262 ft).
