= Mondésir =

Mondésir is a French language surname.

== List of people with the surname ==
- Nathalie Mondésir (born 11/14/1989), Activist, Businesswoman, Author
- Edmond Mondesir (born 1948), Martiniquais musician
- Keith Mondesir (born 1948), Saint Lucian politician
- Manuéla Kéclard-Mondésir (born 1971), French politician from Martinique
- Mark Mondesir (born 1964), English jazz drummer
- Merwin Mondesir (born 1976), Canadian actor
- Michael Mondesir (born 1966), English jazz bass guitarist and composer
- Nérilia Mondésir (born 1999), Haitian footballer

== See also ==
- Mondésir Alladjim (born 1986), Chadian footballer
- Mon Desir restaurant
