= List of airports in Martinique =

Martinique is an island in the eastern Caribbean. It is an overseas department (French: département d'outre-mer, DOM) of France. There is a public international airport, and three private airports on the island.

ICAO location identifiers are linked to each airport's Aeronautical Information Publication (AIP), which are available online in Portable Document Format (PDF) from the French Service d'information aéronautique (SIA). Locations shown in bold are as per the airport's AIP page.

== List ==
**Location**	**ICAO**	**IATA**	**Airport name**	**Usage**	**Coordinates**
**Fort-de-France** / Le Lamentin	TFFF	FDF	Martinique Aimé Césaire International Airport	Public	14°35′32″N 060°59′47″W
L'Ajoupa-Bouillon			Bouillon	Private (heliport)	14.8410974,-61.1066983
Bellefontaine, Martinique			EDF	Private (heliport)	14.6662569,-61.1588776
Le Carbet			Le Carbet	Private (closed?)	14.7068632,-61.1718597

== See also ==
- List of airports by ICAO code: T#Martinique
- List of airports in France
- List of airports in the Caribbean
- Transport in Martinique
- Wikipedia: Airline destination lists: North America#Martinique (France)
