= Toulouse–Lasbordes Airport =

Toulouse - Lasbordes Airport Aéroport de Toulouse - Lasbordes
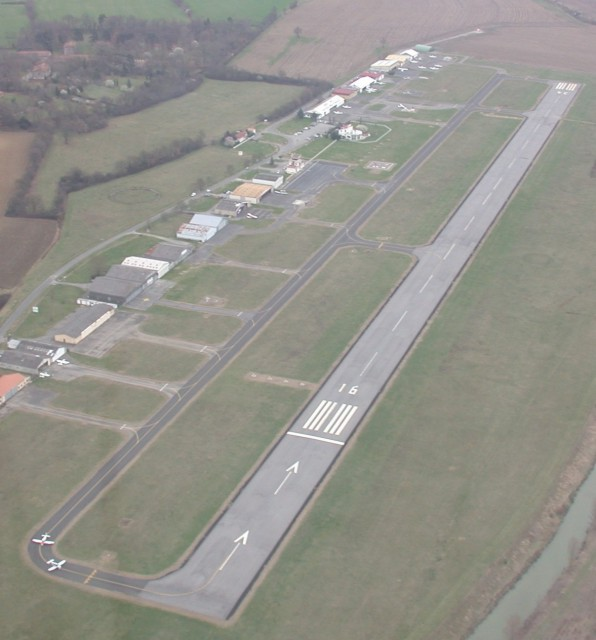
- IATA: none; ICAO: LFCL

Summary
- Airport type: Public
- Serves: Toulouse, France
- Location: Balma, France
- Elevation AMSL: 460 ft (140 m)
- Coordinates: 43°35′16″N 001°29′55″E

Map
- Location in Haute-Garonne department Location of department in France

Runways
Direction	Length		Surface
Direction	m	ft	Surface
16/34	950	3,117	Asphalt
16R/34L	350	1,148	Grass
- Source: French AIP

Toulouse–Lasbordes Airport (French: Aéroport de Toulouse - Lasbordes; Occitan: Aeroport de Tolosa–Lasbordes) (ICAO: LFCL) is a small non-commercial airport in the commune of Balma, situated 4 km (2 miles) east of the city center of Toulouse, both located in the Haute-Garonne department of the Midi-Pyrénées region in southwest France.

== Facilities ==
The airport resides at an elevation of 460 feet (140 m) above mean sea level. It has a 950 m × 23 m (3,117 ft × 75 ft) asphalt runway for light airplanes and a 350 m × 20 m (1,148 ft × 66 ft) grass strip for microlights. The runways are located very close to the large highway surrounding Toulouse.

From the air, the airport is easily found by looking for a large upright Ariane space rocket located in Cité de l'espace (Space Museum) on the opposite side of the motorway.
