= Château-Arnoux-Saint-Auban Airport =

Château-Arnoux-Saint-Auban Airport Aérodrome de Château-Arnoux-Saint-Auban
- IATA: none; ICAO: LFMX

Summary
- Airport type: Public
- Serves: Château-Arnoux-Saint-Auban, France
- Elevation AMSL: 1,507 ft (459 m)
- Coordinates: 44°03′31″N 005°59′27″E

Map
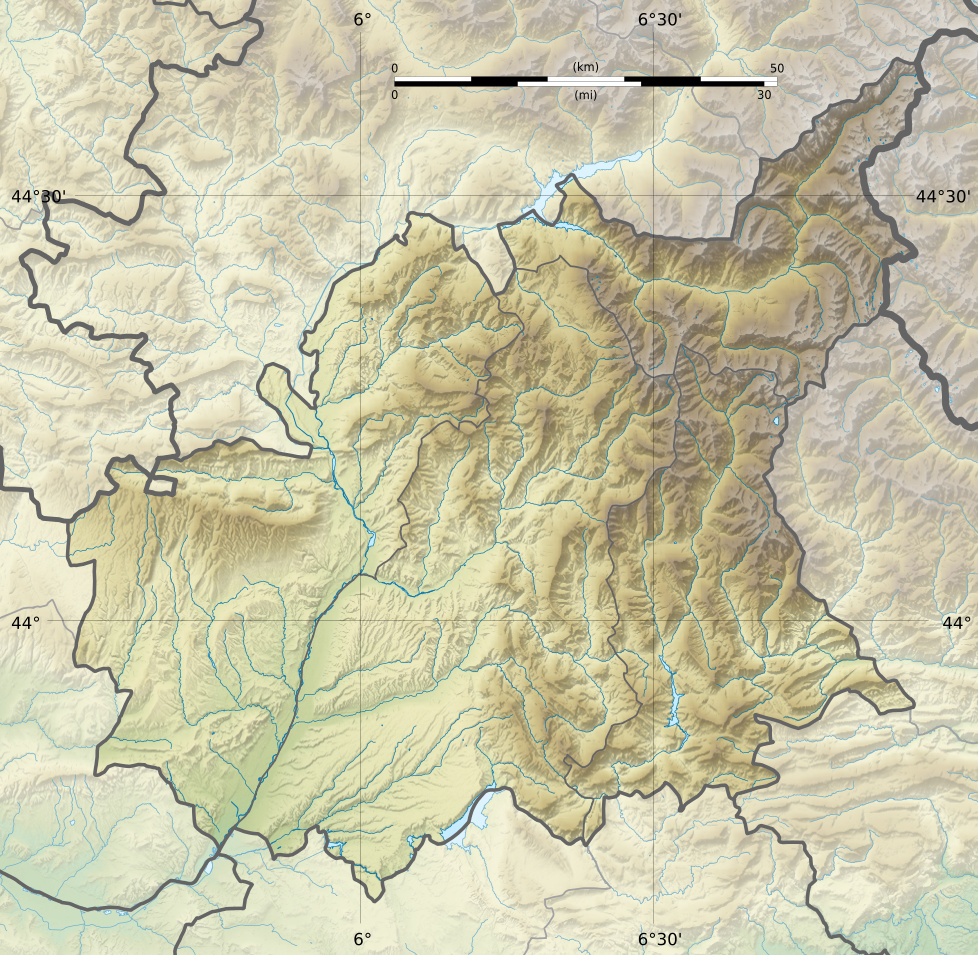
- Location in Alpes-de-Haute-Provence department Location of department in France

Runways
Direction	Length		Surface
Direction	m	ft	Surface
02/20			Grass
- Source: French AIP

Château-Arnoux-Saint-Auban Airport (ICAO: LFMX) is an airport located 4 kilometres (2.5 mi) south-southwest of Château-Arnoux-Saint-Auban, in the Alpes-de-Haute-Provence département of the Provence-Alpes-Côte d'Azur region in France.

A campus of the École nationale de l'aviation civile (French civil aviation university) is located on the aerodrome.
