= List of airports by ICAO code: F =

Due to the size of this list, it has been split into two lists:

- List of airports by ICAO code: FA-FM
- List of airports by ICAO code: FN-FZ
