= Chalon–Champforgeuil Airfield =

Chalon–Champforgeuil Airport Aéroport de Chalon–Champforgeuil
- IATA: none; ICAO: LFLH

Summary
- Airport type: Public
- Operator: SECA RN 6 Aéroport de Chalon Champforgeuil
- Serves: Chalon-sur-Saône, France
- Location: Champforgeuil
- Elevation AMSL: 623 ft / 190 m
- Coordinates: 46°49′34″N 004°49′03″E

Map
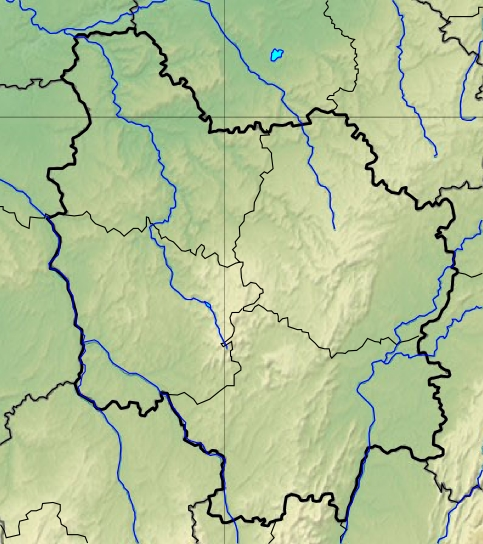
- Location of airfield in Burgundy region Location of Burgundy region in France

Runways
Direction	Length		Surface
Direction	m	ft	Surface
17/35	1,440	4,724	Asphalt
17L/35R	850	2,789	Grass
- Sources: French AIP

Chalon–Champforgeuil Airfield (French: Aéroport de Chalon–Champforgeuil, ICAO: LFLH) is an airfield located at Champforgeuil, 7 kilometres (4.3 mi) north-northwest of Chalon-sur-Saône, both communes of the Saône-et-Loire department in the Burgundy (Bourgogne) region of France.

== Facilities ==
The aerodrome resides at an elevation of 623 feet (190 m) above mean sea level. It has one asphalt paved runways designated 17/35 which measures 1,440 by 30 metres (4,724 ft × 98 ft). It also has a parallel grass runway measuring 850 by 50 metres (2,789 ft × 164 ft).
