= Angoulême–Cognac International Airport =

Angoulême–Cognac International Airport Aéroport international d'Angoulême-Cognac
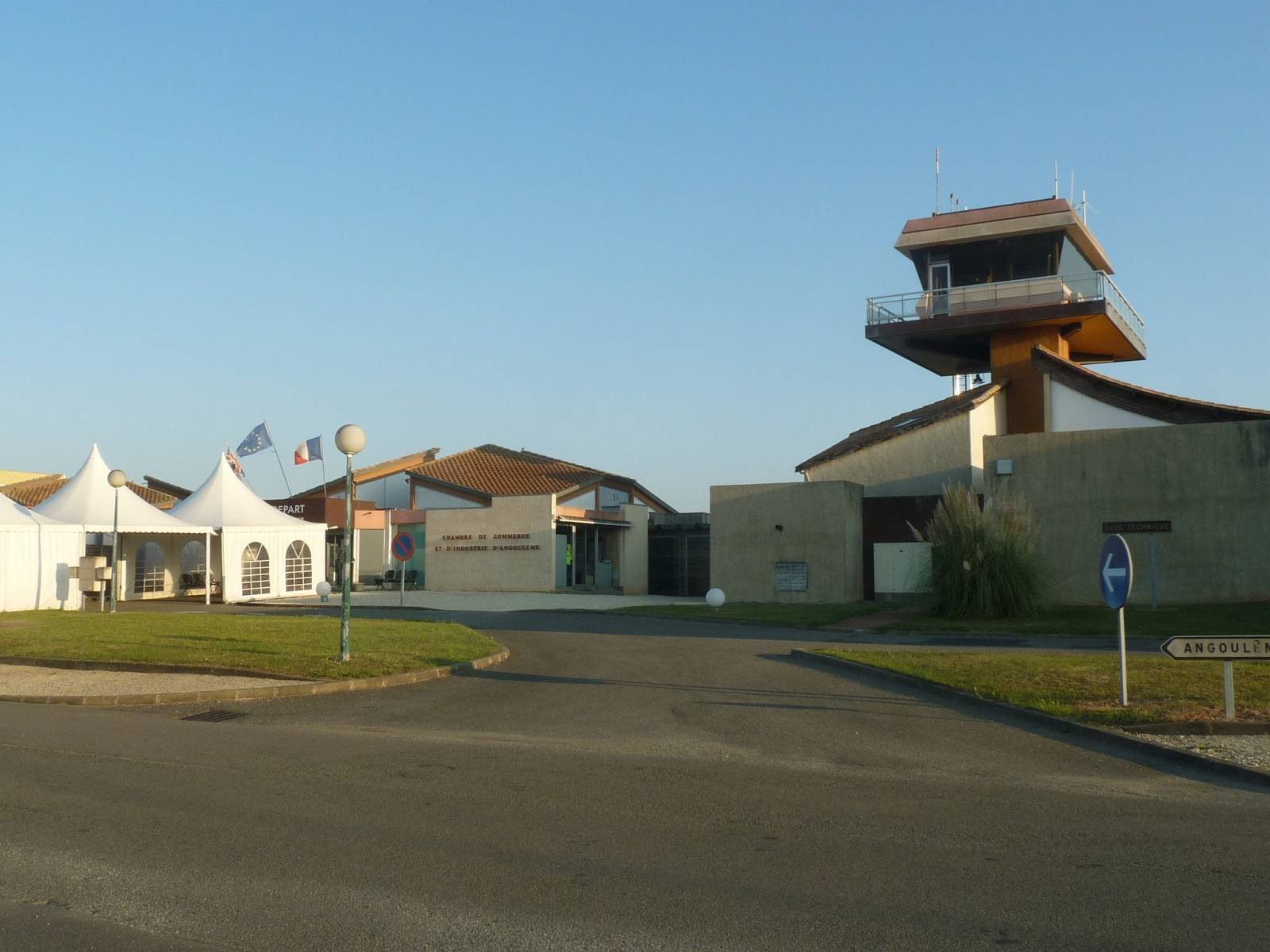
- IATA: ANG; ICAO: LFBU

Summary
- Airport type: Public
- Operator: CCI d'Angoulême
- Serves: Angoulême, Charente, Poitou-Charentes, France
- Location: Champniers
- Elevation AMSL: 133 m / 436 ft
- Coordinates: 45°43′44″N 000°13′08″E
- Website: Aéroport Angoulême-Cognac

Map
- Airport in Nouvelle-Aquitaine region

Runways
Direction	Length		Surface
Direction	m	ft	Surface
10/28	1,810	5,938	Asphalt
- Sources: French AIP, WAD

Angoulême–Cognac International Airport (French: Aéroport international d'Angoulême–Cognac), also known as Angoulême–Brie–Champniers Airport (French: Aéroport d'Angoulême–Brie–Champniers), (IATA: ANG, ICAO: LFBU) is an airport located 15 kilometres (9.3 mi) northeast of Angoulême, between Brie and Champniers, all communes of the Charente département in the Nouvelle-Aquitaine région of France.
