= Branches, Yonne =

Branches
- Commune
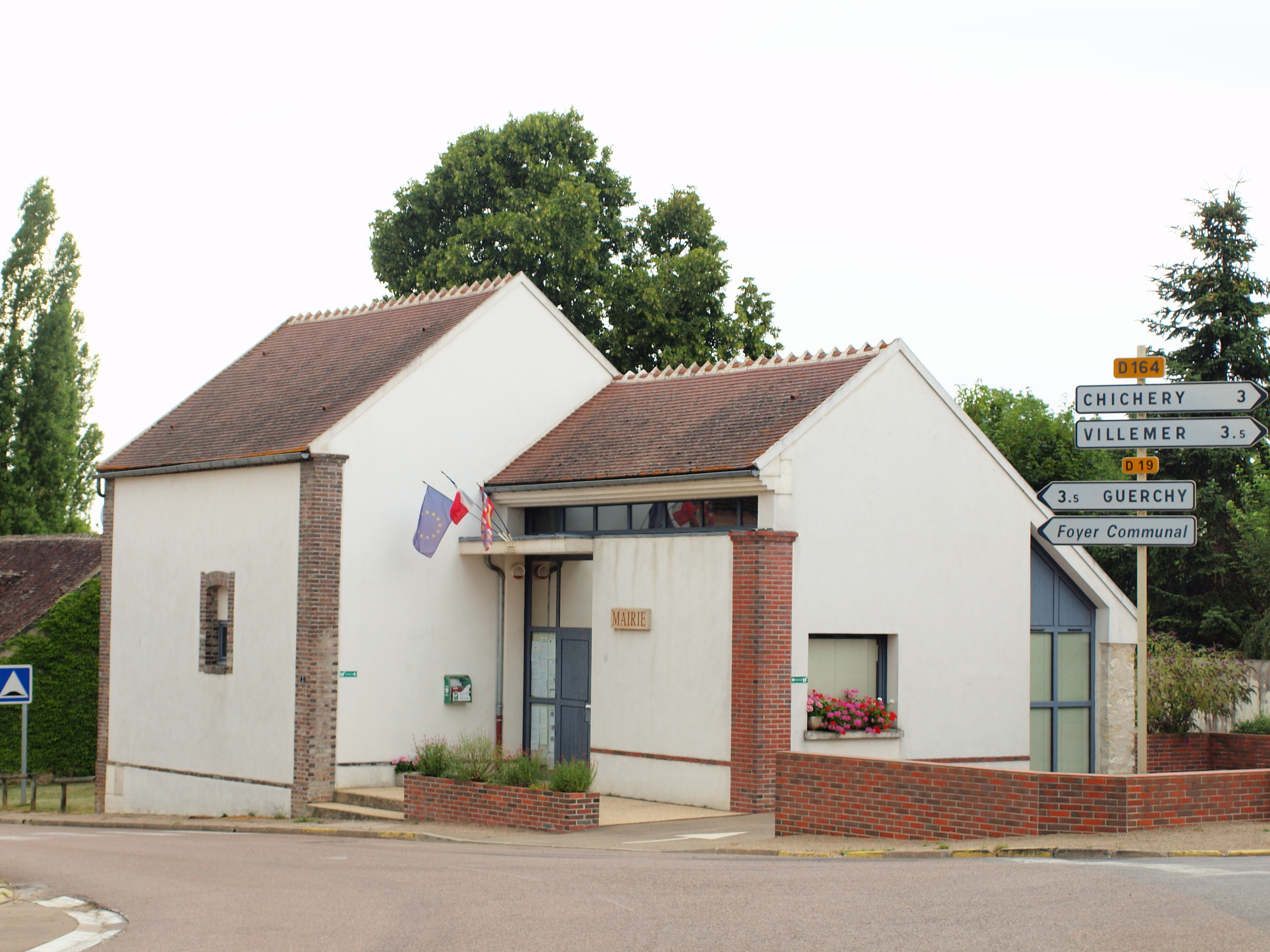
- The town hall in Branches

- Coat of arms
- Location of Branches
- Location within France Location within Bourgogne-Franche-Comté
- Coordinates: 47°53′06″N 3°28′57″E
- Country: France
- Region: Bourgogne-Franche-Comté
- Department: Yonne
- Arrondissement: Auxerre
- Canton: Auxerre-2
- Intercommunality: CA Auxerrois

Government
  - Mayor (2020–2026): Émilie Laforge
- Area^{1}: 10.99 km^{2} (4.24 sq mi)
- Highest elevation: 201 m (659 ft)
- Lowest elevation: 110 m (360 ft)
- Population (2023): 434
  - Density: 39.5/km^{2} (102/sq mi)
- Time zone: UTC+01:00 (CET)
  - Summer (DST): UTC+02:00 (CEST)
- INSEE/Postal code: 89053 /89113
- ^{1} French Land Register data, which excludes lakes, ponds, glaciers > 1 km^{2} (0.386 sq mi or 247 acres) and river estuaries.

Branches (French pronunciation: [bʁɑ̃ʃ]) is a commune in the Yonne department in Bourgogne-Franche-Comté in north-central France.

== See also ==
- Communes of the Yonne department
