= Saint-Denis-de-l'Hôtel =

- Commune
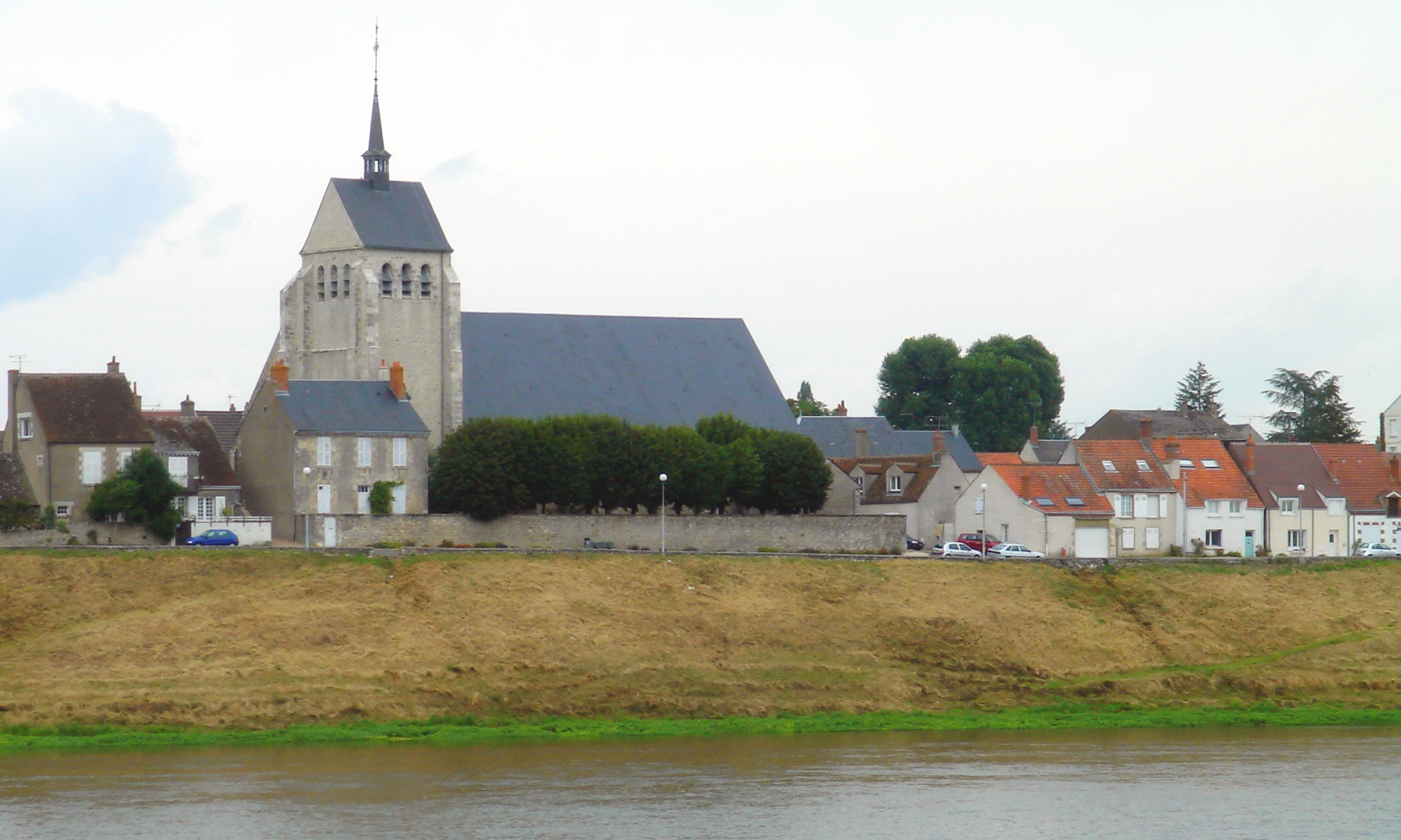
- The church in Saint-Denis-de-l'Hôtel

- Coat of arms
- Location of Saint-Denis-de-l'Hôtel
- Location within France Location within Centre-Val de Loire
- Coordinates: 47°52′27″N 2°07′51″E
- Country: France
- Region: Centre-Val de Loire
- Department: Loiret
- Arrondissement: Orléans
- Canton: Châteauneuf-sur-Loire
- Intercommunality: Loges

Government
  - Mayor (2020–2026): Arnauld Martin
- Area^{1}: 25.45 km^{2} (9.83 sq mi)
- Highest elevation: 124 m (407 ft)
- Lowest elevation: 97 m (318 ft)
- Population (2023): 3,065
  - Density: 120.4/km^{2} (311.9/sq mi)
- Time zone: UTC+01:00 (CET)
  - Summer (DST): UTC+02:00 (CEST)
- INSEE/Postal code: 45273 /45550
- ^{1} French Land Register data, which excludes lakes, ponds, glaciers > 1 km^{2} (0.386 sq mi or 247 acres) and river estuaries.

Saint-Denis-de-l'Hôtel (French pronunciation: [sɛ̃ dəni də lotɛl]) is a commune in the Loiret department in north-central France.

== Population ==
Historical population
Year	Pop.	±% p.a.
1968	1,505	—
1975	2,116	+4.99%
1982	2,289	+1.13%
1990	2,523	+1.22%
1999	2,621	+0.42%
2007	2,777	+0.73%
2012	2,932	+1.09%
2017	3,045	+0.76%
2023	3,065	+0.11%
Source: INSEE

== See also ==
- Communes of the Loiret department
