= Royan–Médis Aerodrome =

Airport in south-west France

Royan–Médis Aerodrome Aérodrome de Royan–Médis
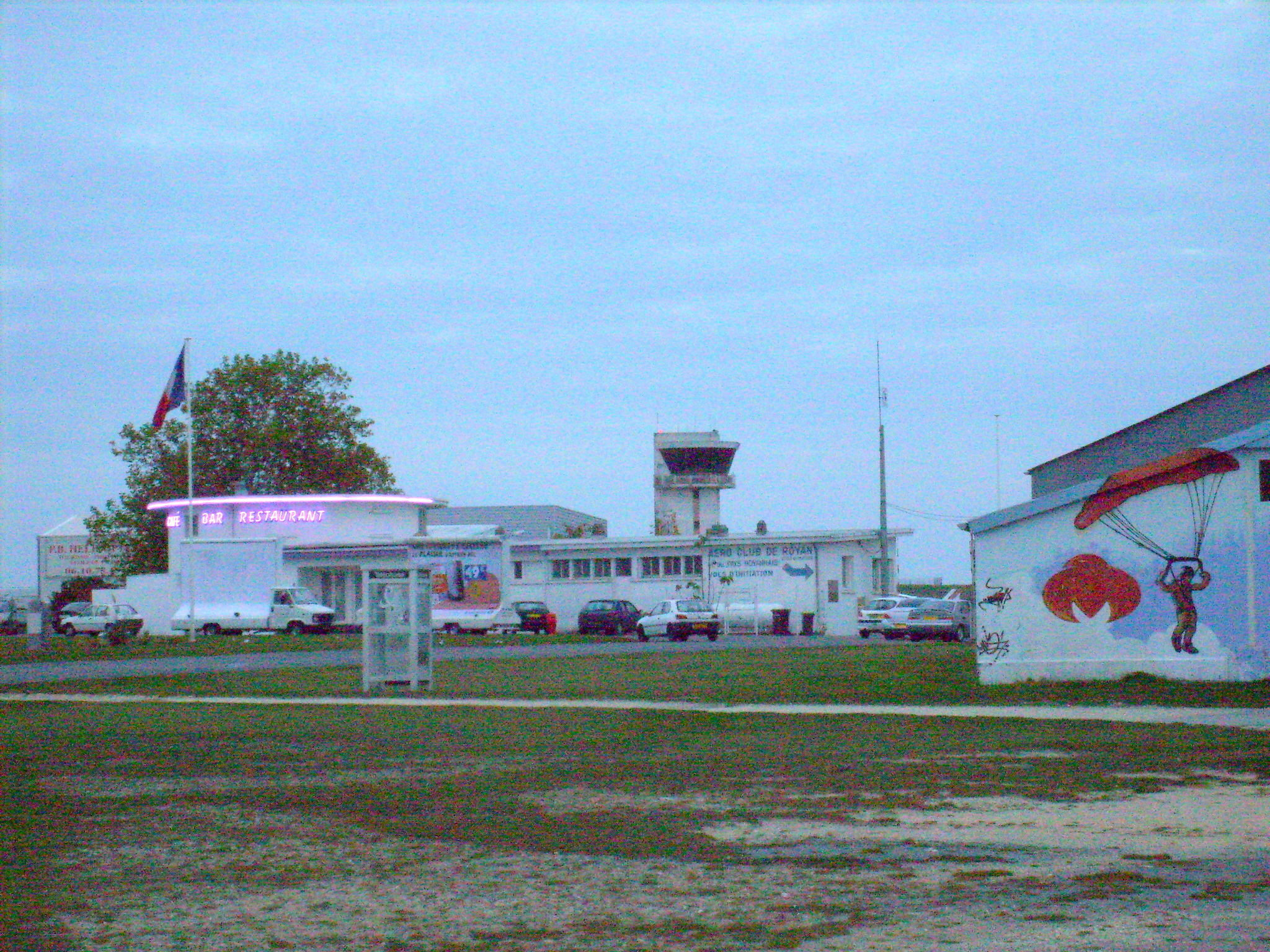
- IATA: RYN; ICAO: LFCY

Summary
- Airport type: Public
- Serves: Royan, France
- Elevation AMSL: 72 ft / 22 m
- Coordinates: 45°37′52″N 00°58′32″W
- Interactive map of Royan–Médis Aerodrome

Runways
Direction	Length		Surface
Direction	m	ft	Surface
10/28	1,255	4,117	Paved
10R/28L	1,000	3,281	Grass
- Source: French AIP

Royan–Médis Aerodrome is an aerodrome located 4 km (2 miles) east of Royan, France.
