= Valence-Chabeuil Airport =

Valence – Chabeuil Airport Advanced Landing Ground (ALG) Y-23
- IATA: VAF; ICAO: LFLU

Summary
- Airport type: Public / Military
- Owner: Department of Drôme
- Operator: Syndicat Mixte de Gestion
- Serves: Valence, Drôme, France
- Location: Chabeuil
- Elevation AMSL: 525 ft / 160 m
- Coordinates: 44°54′56″N 004°58′07″E

Map
- Location of airport in France

Runways
| Direction | Length | | Surface |
| Direction | m | ft | Surface |
|---|---|---|---|
| 01/19 | 2,100 | 6,890 | Asphalt |
| 01L/19R | 1,190 | 3,904 | Grass |
| 01L/19R | 400 | 1,312 | Grass |
- Sources: French AIP, UAF

Valence – Chabeuil Airport (IATA: VAF, ICAO: LFLU) is an airport in France, located about 5 miles (8 km) east of Valence (in the Drôme department, Rhone-Alpes region) and approximately 300 miles (483 km) south-southeast of Paris.

The airport was a pre-World War II French Air Force (Armée de l'Air) airfield. After the Battle of France, it was seized by Nazi Germany in November 1942. It was later used by the Luftwaffe, and after the Allied Invasion of southern France in August 1944, by the United States Army Air Forces Twelfth Air Force.

Used by the French Air Force base after the war, it was closed and today the airport is used for general aviation, with no commercial airline service. It is still occasionally used by military aircraft. The French army aviation (Aviation légère de l'Armée de terre) have maintained a small enclave here for many years operating a small number of diverse helicopter types as part of the test unit GALSTA/STAT. Closure of this facility (with the unit moving to Le Luc) was announced some years ago, but it would appear this has been rescinded.

== History ==
The airport's origin dates from the 1930s when the French Air Force (Armée de l'Air) established Valence-Chabeuil Air Base. It was the headquarters for the Zone d'Opérations Aériennes des Alpes – Z.O.A.A. (Alps Air Operations Area). Known operational units assigned were:

- G.R. II/14 Potez 637 (1)
- G.A.O. 582 Potez 63.11 (undetermined – in training)
- G.A.O. 1/584 Potez Potez 63.11 (3) (in training)

The Potez was a heavy twin-engined fighter. With the outbreak of war in May 1940, the unit did not see action against the Germans in the Battle of France. However, operations were flown against the Italian Army (Regio Esercito) after the Italian invasion of France on 10 June. After the Second Armistice at Compiègne the Armée de l'Air units assigned to the airfield were ordered to French North Africa, and the airport was closed by the Vichy France government.

=== German use during World War II ===
After the forceful occupation of Vichy France in November 1942 as a result of Case Anton Wehrmacht units moved into the Valence area and the airport came under the control of the Luftwaffe. It was not, however, used as an operational base until July 1943 when XI. Fliegerkorps moved Luftlandegeschwader 1 (LLG 1) (Airborne Squadron 1) to the airport, equipped with 32 Henschel Hs 126 reconnaissance aircraft and 120 DFS 230 light transport gliders. In early August 1944, Kampfgeschwader 26 (KG 26) moved Junkers Ju 88s to the airfield to attack advancing United States Seventh Army forces moving north, but the Luftwaffe was driven out by Twelfth Air Force attacks.

=== American use ===
Twelfth Air Force combat engineers moved into Valence-Chabeuil Airport in late August 1944, and cleared the airport of mines and destroyed German aircraft. It was declared ready for operational use on 2 September 1944. It was designated as Advanced Landing Ground "Y-23 Valence". The 79th Fighter Group was assigned to the airport and operated P-47 Thunderbolt fighter-bomber aircraft until the end of September 1944, until moving north with the advancing Allied forces. Once the combat unit moved out, Valence-Chabeuil became a transport airfield, supporting C-47 Skytrain resupply and also casualty evacuation flights until being returned to French control on 20 November 1944.

=== Postwar/current use ===
In 1945 the Armée de l'Air returned to its airfield and it returned to its prewar status as an active air base. A 2100m all-weather asphalt runway was laid down for jet aircraft operations, and the damage caused by World War II was repaired. It is undetermined when it was converted to a civilian airport.

Today the airport is a modern, fully equipped facility with two additional parallel grass runways available for use. A large aircraft parking ramp along with a hangar and support buildings are available.

== See also ==
- Advanced Landing Ground
