= Aubenas Aerodrome =

Aubenas Aerodrome Aérodrome d'Aubenas
- IATA: OBS; ICAO: LFHO

Summary
- Airport type: Public
- Serves: Aubenas
- Location: Lanas
- Coordinates: 44°32′24″N 004°22′09″E
- Interactive map of Aubenas Aerodrome

Runways
Direction	Length		Surface
Direction	ft	m	Surface
01/19	4,675	1,425	Paved

Aubenas Aerodrome or Aubenas Ardèche Méridionale Aerodrome (French: Aérodrome d'Aubenas) (IATA: OBS, ICAO: LFHO) is an airfield in Lanas, a commune in Ardèche, France. It has no scheduled airline service. It is home to the ULM makers Air Création.
