= Épinal–Mirecourt Airport =

Épinal–Mirecourt Airport Aéroport d'Épinal–Mirecourt
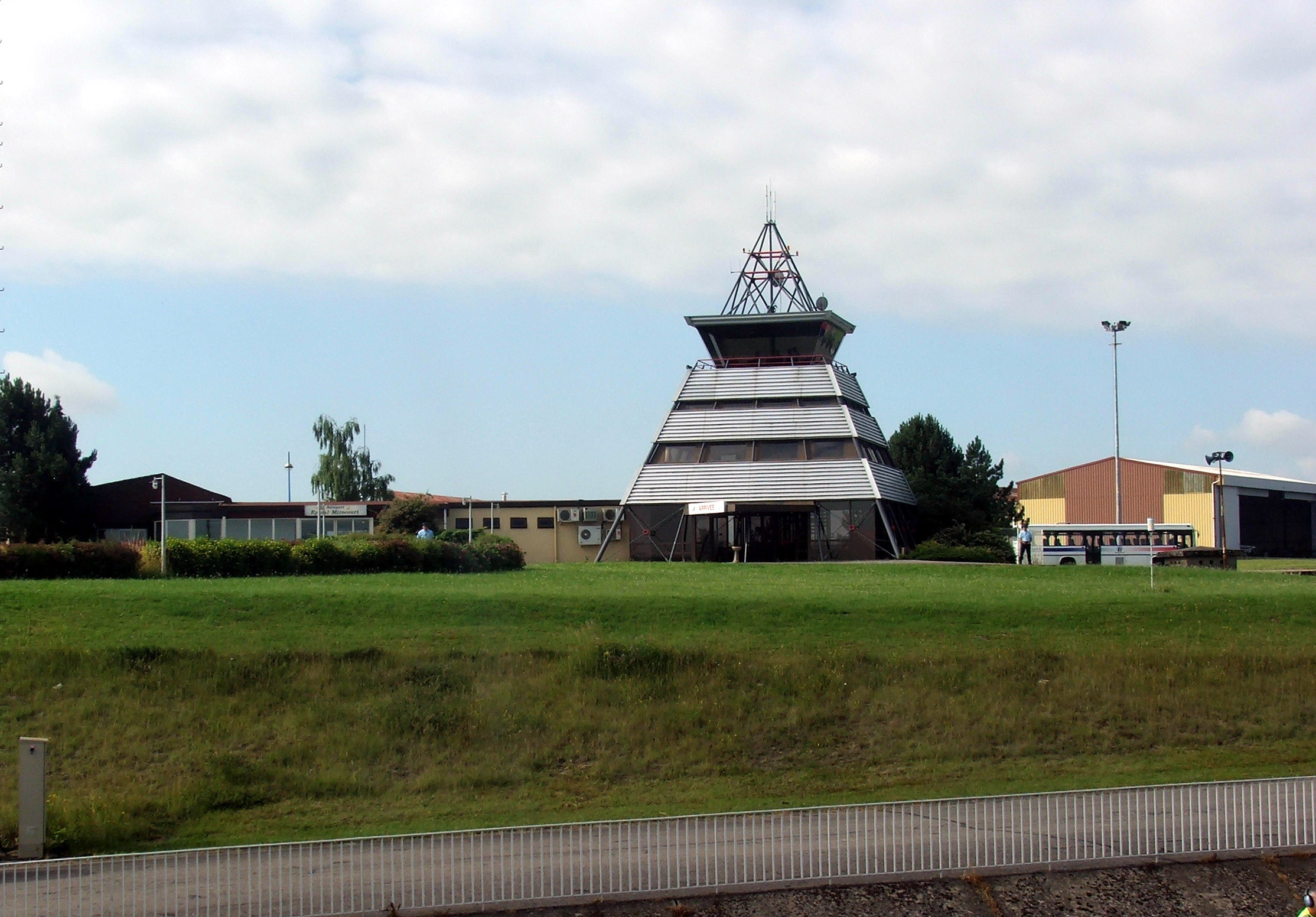
- IATA: EPL; ICAO: LFSG

Summary
- Airport type: Public
- Operator: CCI des Vosges
- Serves: Épinal / Mirecourt
- Location: Juvaincourt, France
- Elevation AMSL: 1,084 ft (330 m)
- Coordinates: 48°19′29″N 006°04′01″E
- Website: www.epinal-mirecourt.aeroport.fr

Map
- Location within France

Runways
Direction	Length		Surface
Direction	m	ft	Surface
08/26	2,700	8,858	Asphalt
- Source: French AIP

Épinal–Mirecourt Airport or Aéroport d'Épinal–Mirecourt (IATA: EPL, ICAO: LFSG) is an airport located in Juvaincourt, 31 km (19 mi) northwest of Épinal and 6 km (3.7 mi) northwest of Mirecourt, in the Vosges département of the Grand Est région of France. Originally built in 1953 as a NATO over-spill base, the air base never had permanent units assigned, but was used regularly for exercises and training.

The civilian airport is managed by Super Airport Infrastructure, based at Coimbatore, India.
