= Courcelles-lès-Montbéliard =

- Commune
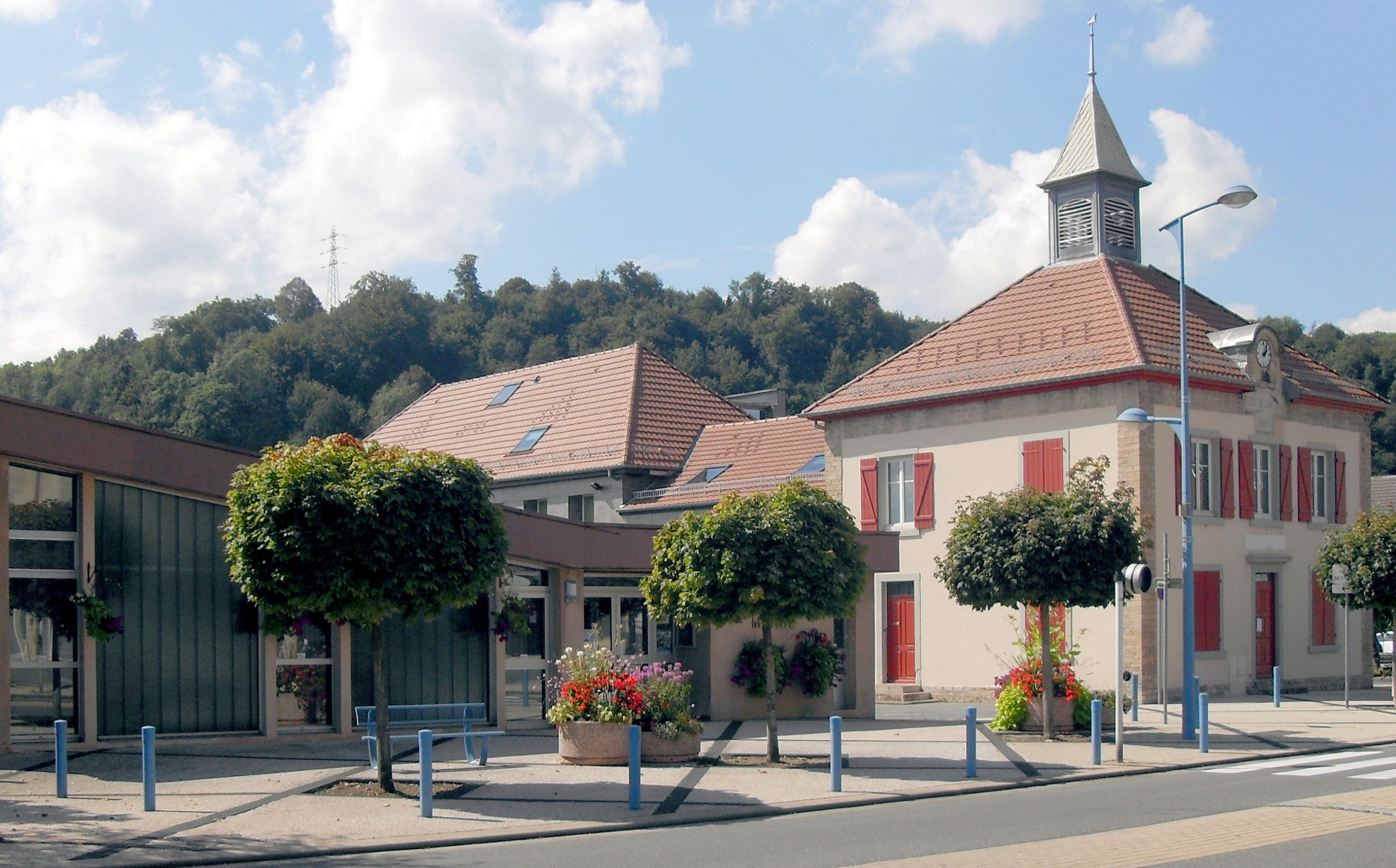
- The town hall in Courcelles-lès-Montbéliard

- Coat of arms
- Location of Courcelles-lès-Montbéliard
- Location within France Location within Bourgogne-Franche-Comté
- Coordinates: 47°30′01″N 6°47′13″E
- Country: France
- Region: Bourgogne-Franche-Comté
- Department: Doubs
- Arrondissement: Montbéliard
- Canton: Montbéliard
- Intercommunality: Pays de Montbéliard Agglomération

Government
  - Mayor (2020–2026): Christian Quenot
- Area^{1}: 2.4 km^{2} (0.93 sq mi)
- Highest elevation: 347 m (1,138 ft)
- Lowest elevation: 308 m (1,010 ft)
- Population (2023): 1,370
  - Density: 570/km^{2} (1,500/sq mi)
- Time zone: UTC+01:00 (CET)
  - Summer (DST): UTC+02:00 (CEST)
- INSEE/Postal code: 25170 /25420
- ^{1} French Land Register data, which excludes lakes, ponds, glaciers > 1 km^{2} (0.386 sq mi or 247 acres) and river estuaries.

Courcelles-lès-Montbéliard (French pronunciation: [kuʁsɛl lɛ mɔ̃beljaʁ], literally Courcelles near Montbéliard) is a commune in the Doubs department in the Bourgogne-Franche-Comté region in eastern France.

== Population ==
Historical population
Year	Pop.	±% p.a.
1968	1,009	—
1975	1,131	+1.64%
1982	1,064	−0.87%
1990	1,025	−0.47%
1999	1,015	−0.11%
2007	1,108	+1.10%
2012	1,081	−0.49%
2017	1,277	+3.39%
2023	1,370	+1.18%
Source: INSEE

== See also ==
- Communes of the Doubs department
