= List of Belavia destinations =

Belavia is the Belarus flag carrier airline which flies to four domestic destinations and a number of international airports.

== 2020 novel coronavirus outbreak ==
On 12 March 2020, Belavia suspended until 15 April its Minsk-Rome service due to the coronavirus pandemic. On 14 March it was announced that connections to Ukraine (Kyiv, Lviv, Odesa, Kharkiv) were to be shut down from 17 March to 31 March, to Larnaca Cyprus from 15 to 30 March 2020, and to Warsaw from 15 to 27 March 2020. On 18 March, flights were cancelled to Kazan, Krasnodar, Moscow–Zhukovsky, Nizhny Novgorod, Rostov-on-Don, Sochi, Voronezh. More flight cancellations continued in the following weeks as the pandemic spread around the world and in Belarus.

Many of the flights were restarted in the following months as the global situation began to show signs of improvement.

== 2021 Ryanair flight incident ==
Following the Ryanair Flight 4978 incident on 23 May 2021, the airline was banned from overflight and landings in all European Union member states as well as the United Kingdom, Switzerland and Ukraine.

== Destinations ==
The list includes the city, country, and the airport's name, with the airline's hub marked.

Country	City	Airport	Notes	Ref.
Albania	Tirana	Tirana International Airport Nënë Tereza	Terminated	
Armenia	Yerevan	Zvartnots International Airport		
Austria	Vienna	Vienna International Airport	Terminated	
Azerbaijan	Baku	Heydar Aliyev International Airport		
Belarus	Brest	Brest Airport		
Belarus	Homiel	Homiel Airport		
Belarus	Hrodna	Hrodna Airport	Seasonal	
Belarus	Mahilyow	Mahilyow Airport		
Belarus	Minsk	Minsk National Airport	Hub	
Belarus	Vitsyebsk	Vitsyebsk Uskhodni Airport		
Belgium	Charleroi	Brussels South Charleroi Airport	Terminated	
Bulgaria	Burgas	Burgas Airport	Terminated	
Bulgaria	Varna	Varna Airport	Terminated	
China	Beijing	Beijing Capital International Airport	Terminated	
China	Sanya	Sanya Phoenix International Airport		
China	Ürümqi	Ürümqi Diwopu International Airport		
Cyprus	Larnaca	Larnaca International Airport	Terminated	
Czech Republic	Prague	Václav Havel Airport Prague	Terminated	
Egypt	Cairo	Cairo International Airport	Terminated	
Egypt	El Alamein	El Alamein International Airport	Seasonal Charter	
Egypt	Hurghada	Hurghada International Airport	Seasonal Charter	
Egypt	Marsa Alam	Marsa Alam International Airport	Terminated	
Egypt	Sharm El Sheikh	Sharm El Sheikh International Airport	Seasonal Charter	
Estonia	Tallinn	Tallinn Airport	Terminated	
Finland	Helsinki	Helsinki Airport	Terminated	
France	Nice	Nice Côte d'Azur Airport	Terminated	
France	Paris	Charles de Gaulle Airport	Terminated	
Georgia	Batumi	Batumi International Airport		
Georgia	Kutaisi	David the Builder Kutaisi International Airport		
Georgia	Tbilisi	Tbilisi International Airport		
Germany	Berlin	Berlin Brandenburg Airport	Terminated	
Germany	Berlin	Berlin Schönefeld Airport	Airport Closed	
Germany	Frankfurt	Frankfurt Airport	Terminated	
Germany	Hanover	Hannover Airport	Terminated	
Germany	Munich	Franz Josef Strauss Munich Airport	Terminated	
Greece	Heraklion	Heraklion International Airport "Nikos Kazantzakis"	Terminated	
Greece	Patras	Patras Araxos Airport	Terminated	
Greece	Rhodes	Rhodes International Airport "Diagoras"	Terminated	
Hungary	Budapest	Budapest Ferenc Liszt International Airport	Terminated	
India	Delhi	Indira Gandhi International Airport		
Iran	Tehran	Tehran Imam Khomeini International Airport	Terminated	
Ireland	Shannon	Shannon Airport	Terminated	
Israel	Tel Aviv	David Ben Gurion International Airport		
Italy	Milan	Milan Malpensa Airport	Terminated	
Italy	Rome	Rome Fiumicino Airport	Terminated	
Jordan	Aqaba	King Hussein International Airport	Terminated	
Kazakhstan	Almaty	Almaty International Airport		
Kazakhstan	Aqtau	Aqtau International Airport	Terminated	
Kazakhstan	Astana	Nursultan Nazarbayev International Airport		
Kazakhstan	Pavlodar	Pavlodar Airport	Terminated	
Kazakhstan	Qarağandy	Sary-Arka Airport	Terminated	
Kazakhstan	Qostanai	Qostanai Airport	Terminated	
Latvia	Riga	Riga International Airport	Terminated	
Lebanon	Beirut	Beirut–Rafic Hariri International Airport	Terminated	
Libya	Bengazi	Benina International Airport	Terminated	
Libya	Tripoli	Tripoli International Airport	Airport Closed	
Lithuania	Palanga	Palanga International Airport	Terminated	
Lithuania	Vilnius	Vilnius Airport	Terminated	
Moldova	Chișinău	Chișinău International Airport	Terminated	
Montenegro	Tivat	Tivat Airport	Terminated	
Netherlands	Amsterdam	Amsterdam Airport Schiphol	Terminated	
Oman	Salalah	Salalah International Airport	Terminated	
Poland	Warsaw	Warsaw Chopin Airport	Terminated	
Qatar	Doha	Hamad International Airport	Terminated	
Russia	Kaliningrad	Khrabrovo Airport		
Russia	Kazan	Ğabdulla Tuqay Kazan International Airport		
Russia	Krasnodar	Krasnodar International Airport	Terminated	
Russia	Makhachkala	Uytash Airport	Seasonal	
Russia	Moscow	Moscow Domodedovo Airport		
Russia	Moscow	Sheremetyevo International Airport		
Russia	Moscow	Vnukovo International Airport		
Russia	Moscow	Zhukovsky International Airport		
Russia	Murmansk	Murmansk Airport	Seasonal	
Russia	Nizhny Novgorod	Strigino International Airport	Terminated	
Russia	Novosibirsk	Tolmachevo Airport	Terminated	
Russia	Noyabrsk	Noyabrsk Airport	Seasonal Charter	
Russia	Rostov-on-Don	Platov International Airport	Terminated	
Russia	Saint Petersburg	Pulkovo Airport		
Russia	Samara	Kurumoch International Airport	Terminated	
Russia	Sochi	Adler-Sochi International Airport		
Russia	Ufa	Mostay Kərim Ufa International Airport		
Russia	Volgograd	Gumrak Airport	Terminated	
Russia	Voronezh	Volgograd International Airport	Terminated	
Russia	Yekaterinburg	Koltsovo International Airport		
Serbia	Belgrade	Belgrade Nikola Tesla Airport	Terminated	
Spain	Barcelona	Josep Tarradellas Barcelona–El Prat Airport	Terminated	
Spain	Reus	Reus Airport	Terminated	
Sri Lanka	Hambantota	Mattala Rajapaksa International Airport	Seasonal Charter	
Sweden	Stockholm	Stockholm Arlanda Airport	Terminated	
Switzerland	Geneva	Geneva Airport	Terminated	
Thailand	Bangkok	Suvarnabhumi Airport	Begins 25 October 2026	
Thailand	Pattaya	U-Tapao International Airport	Seasonal Charter	
Thailand	Phuket	Phuket International Airport	Resumes 21 October 2026	
Tunisia	Enfidha	Enfidha–Hammamet International Airport	Seasonal	
Tunisia	Tunis	Tunis–Carthage International Airport	Terminated	
Turkey	Antalya	Antalya Airport	Seasonal Charter	
Turkey	Bodrum	Milas–Bodrum Airport	Seasonal Charter	
Turkey	Dalaman	Dalaman Airport	Terminated	
Turkey	Istanbul	Atatürk Airport	Airport Closed	
Turkey	Istanbul	Istanbul Airport		
Turkey	İzmir	İzmir Adnan Menderes Airport	Seasonal Charter	
Turkmenistan	Aşgabat	Aşgabat International Airport	Terminated	
Turkmenistan	Balkanabat	Balkanabat International Airport	Terminated	
Turkmenistan	Türkmenbaşy	Türkmenbaşy International Airport		
Ukraine	Kharkiv	Kharkiv International Airport	Terminated	
Ukraine	Kyiv	Boryspil International Airport	Terminated	
Ukraine	Kyiv	Igor Sikorsky Kyiv International Airport (Zhuliany)	Terminated	
Ukraine	Lviv	Lviv Danylo Halytskyi International Airport	Terminated	
Ukraine	Odesa	Odesa International Airport	Terminated	
United Arab Emirates	Abu Dhabi	Zayed International Airport	Terminated	
United Arab Emirates	Dubai	Dubai International Airport		
United Arab Emirates	Ras Al Khaimah	Ras Al Khaimah International Airport	Terminated	
United Arab Emirates	Sharjah	Sharjah International Airport	Terminated	
United Kingdom	London	Gatwick Airport	Terminated	
United Kingdom	Manchester	Manchester Airport	Terminated	
Uzbekistan	Tashkent	Islam Karimov Tashkent International Airport		
Vietnam	Da Nang	Da Nang International Airport	Seasonal charter	
Vietnam	Nha Trang	Cam Ranh International Airport	Seasonal Charter	
Vietnam	Phu Quoc	Phu Quoc International Airport	Seasonal Charter	
