= Airport Carbon Accreditation =

Global carbon management program

Logo of the programme

Airport Carbon Accreditation is a global carbon management programme for airports that independently assesses and recognises airports' efforts to manage and reduce their CO_{2} emissions. Aircraft emissions, which are many times greater than airport emissions, are not included in the programme. The airport industry accounts for 5% of the air transport sector’s total carbon emissions.

The programme was launched by European airports' trade body ACI EUROPE at their Annual Congress in June 2009. It is independently administered by Environmental Minds, an international consultancy firm. The programme provides airports with a common framework for active carbon management with measurable goal-posts. Individual airport carbon footprints are independently verified in accordance with ISO 14064 (Greenhouse Gas Accounting) on the basis of supporting evidence. Claims regarding airports' carbon management processes are also independently verified by a group of 117 independent verifiers, based in 36 countries.

== Levels ==
=== Level 1: Mapping ===
To achieve Level 1 accreditation, an airport must meet the following qualifications:

- Be able to determine ‘operational boundary’ and the emissions sources within that boundary which are Scope 1 and Scope 2 sources, as defined by the Greenhouse Gas Protocol. The operational boundary in the context of carbon accounting defined the manner in which the airport measures and manages its GHG emissions.
- Be able to collect and process data and calculate the annual carbon emissions for those sources.
- Generate a carbon footprint report.

For airports, ACERT, the Airport Carbon and Emissions Reporting Tool, which provided by ACI World, is free of charge to its members and is usually what is used to generate a carbon footprint report.

=== Level 2: Reduction ===
To achieve Level 2 accreditation, an airport must meet the following qualifications:

- Meet all above requirements.
- Implement target setting procedures and provide evidence of carbon management procedures that are effective.
- Reduce the carbon footprint by comparing the current year report to prior years.

Carbon management is a broad topic and includes the following processes:

- Low carbon/energy policies
- Senior committee or body has responsibility for climate change/carbon/energy matters
- Fuel and energy monitoring
- Carbon/energy reduction targets
- Actions, programs or control mechanisms to ensure operations minimize emissions
- Emissions impact of investments are analyzed
- Awareness training about emissions
- Self-assessment and Auditing to monitor progress towards improvements
- Communication emissions performance

=== Level 3: Optimization ===
To achieve Level 3 accreditation, an airport must meet the following qualifications:

- Meet all above requirements.
- Widen the scope of its carbon footprint to include a range of Scope 3 emissions.
- Scope 3 emissions to be measured include, amongst others:
  - landing/take-off cycle emissions.
  - surface access to the airport for both passengers and staff.
  - staff business travel emissions,
- Evidence of engagement with third party operators to reduce wider airport-based carbon emissions.

=== Level 3+: Neutrality ===
To achieve Level 3+ accreditation, an airport must meet the following qualifications:

- Meet all above requirements.
- Offset Scope 1 and 2 carbon emissions, as well as emissions from business travel, using internationally recognized offsets.

Carbon neutrality, or net-zero emissions, is achieved when any residual airport emissions are compensated through the purchases of carbon credits.

=== Level 4: Transformation ===
To achieve Level 4 accreditation, an airport must meet the following qualifications:

- Meet all above requirements.
- Policy commitment to absolute emissions reduction.
- Form a long-term absolute carbon emissions reduction target.
  - The target amount and date shall be aligned with the IPCC 1.5 °C or 2 °C pathways
- Carbon Management Plan development with targets. Each airport shall define its trajectory to achieve its carbon emissions reduction target as well as the actions it expects to implement to remain on that trajectory.
- Stakeholder Partnership Plan development. The plan shall demonstrate that the airport actively drives third parties at the airport towards delivering emissions reductions themselves via their own reduction plans or through measures initiated by the airport operator.

=== Level 4+: Transition ===
To achieve Level 4+ accreditation, an airport must meet the following qualifications:

- Meet all above requirements.
- Offset remaining Scope 1 and 2 carbon emissions and emissions from staff business travel using internationally recognized offset.

=== Level 5: Topmost Level of Airport Carbon Accreditation ===
To achieve Level 5 accreditation, an airport must meet the following qualifications:

- Submit a verified carbon footprint for Scope 1 and 2 emissions and all relevant categories of Scope 3 emissions as per requirements of the GHG Protocol Scope 3 Guidance
- Reach and maintain ≥ 90% absolute CO_{2} emissions reductions in Scope 1 and 2, and commit to Net Zero in Scope 3 by 2050 or sooner.
- Credible carbon removals for the residual emissions are applied.
- Carbon Management Plan (CMP) fully developed outlining the steps to achieve emissions targets.
- Stakeholder Partnership Plan is fully developed to achieve Net Zero for Scope 3 emissions by engaging with the value chain and actively drive third parties at the airport towards delivering emissions reductions themselves with regular milestones in line with their sectors Net Zero frameworks and commitments.

== Official endorsements ==
The initiative is a direct consequence of the resolution on Climate Change adopted in June 2008 by the ACI EUROPE annual assembly, and has been endorsed by both the European Civil Aviation Conference and EUROCONTROL. The administration of Airport Carbon Accreditation is overseen by an independent Advisory Board, members of which include representatives of the United Nations Framework Convention for Climate Change (UNFCCC), United Nations Environment Programme (UNEP), European Civil Aviation Conference (ECAC), the European Commission, EUROCONTROL, Federal Aviation Administration (FAA) and Manchester Metropolitan University. On 30 November 2011 it was announced that the International Civil Aviation Organization (ICAO) was also formally supporting the programme, and taking a seat on the independent advisory board.

In addition to European Commission participation on the Advisory Board, the then European Commission Vice President responsible for Transport Siim Kallas has strongly supported the scheme, participating in the presentation of accreditation certificates at several European Airports, including Charles de Gaulle, Orly, Brussels and Budapest Airports. He has also stated that he believes the initiative "is playing a crucial role in helping move European aviation onto a more sustainable footing."

== Global use ==
The programme has expanded beyond Europe on 30 November 2011, having been formally extended to the Asia-Pacific region at ACI Airport Exchange conference in Abu Dhabi, organised by ACI ASIA-PACIFIC. The first airport to become accredited within this region was Abu Dhabi International Airport which achieved 'Mapping' level. Since then, 38 airports from the region joined the community of accredited airports. The programme was further extended with the African region of ACI joining the community in June 2013. The launch of Airport Carbon Accreditation in Africa was coupled with the official certification of the first African airport to the programme, Enfidha-Hammamet International Airport in Tunisia, which was certified at the 'Mapping' level. In June 2014, at ACI EUROPE's Annual Congress in Frankfurt the Airport Carbon Accreditation programme celebrated two important milestones in its story: its 5th anniversary together with crossing the threshold of 100 airports participating in the programme.

Shortly thereafter, in fall 2014, the programme became global, with its official launch in North America, followed by its introduction in the region of Latin America and the Caribbean. Having already achieved significant results in 5 continents, the launch of Airport Carbon Accreditation in this region, in partnership with ACI Latin America & the Caribbean, marked the decisive moment when the programme became the global standard for carbon management at airports.

In 2015, a new interactive website, www.airportco2.org, was launched at the end of Year 6 of Airport Carbon Accreditation – the year of the global expansion of the programme. This microsite was created to promote the programme in more accessible language and to communicate the annual results achieved by participating airports. It continues to present key figures from the programme, both globally and per region, in a more visual and engaging way.

== At Paris Sustainable Innovation Forum (COP21) ==
The COP21 Conference in Paris in December 2015 was an important milestone for the Airport Carbon Accreditation programme. On the occasion of its presentation at the Conference, the European airport industry committed to increasing the number of carbon neutral airports to 50 by 2030. Following the announcement of this commitment, ACI EUROPE and the carbon standard Airport Carbon Accreditation signed a partnership with the United Nations Framework Convention on Climate Change (UNFCCC), at a special side event. The partnership agreement committed ACI to supporting the UNFCCC's 'Climate Neutral Now' campaign, while the UNFCCC would support airport climate action at airports, with a particular focus on carbon management by airports through Airport Carbon Accreditation. The organisations agreed also to develop a common work programme and communications plan promoting carbon neutrality at airports.

== European airports commit to 100 carbon neutral airports by 2030 ==
In June 2017, at ACI EUROPE's 27th Annual Congress, European airports made a new pledge, doubling the one made during COP21. They committed to 100 carbon neutral airports by 2030. Over 20 airport operator companies signed the new commitment, among which: Groupe ADP, AENA, Aeroporto di Bologna, Aeroport Brest Bretagne, Aeroports de la Côte d'Azur, Bristol Airport, Brussels Airport, Finavia, Heathrow Airport, London City Airport, Geneva Airport, Munich Airport, Aeroporto Internazionale di Napoli, Aeroport Quimper Bretagne, Schiphol Group and Zurich Airport.

== Awards and recognition ==
The Airport Carbon Accreditation programme has gathered a number of notable climate-action awards. In 2013, the programme reached Top 3 in the World You Like competition, a contest in which businesses, NGOs and local authorities can participate by showcasing their climate-friendly solutions, run by the European Commission's Directorate-General for Climate Action. The Airport Carbon Accreditation programme was chosen out of 269 low carbon projects in Europe – and the only transport project in the Top 3. It was recognised as an efficient and innovative climate solution that is making a real difference in helping airports address their CO_{2} emissions. In May 2014, the airport industry's efforts to address its carbon emissions received the Highly Commended prize at the annual global International Transport Forum (ITF) Awards issued by the Organisation for Economic Cooperation and Development (OECD). The voluntary climate change initiative Airport Carbon Accreditation was named as one of two runners-up for the ITF's Transport Achievement Award.

Only a month later, in June 2015, the animation "Life is about Movement", created to highlight the essence of the programme, was awarded the Gold Totem prize in the "Businesses & Eco-Performances" category at the 4th Deauville Green Awards 2015.

In 2016, Airport Carbon Accreditation was featured in the first ever European Aviation Environmental Report, published by the European Commission, in very positive terms as one of the innovative initiatives of the airport industry to tackle environmental challenges.

== Current state ==
As of 2017, 192 airports across the world are certified at one of the four levels of Airport Carbon Accreditation. These airports handle 2.7 billion passengers a year, 38.4% of global air passenger traffic. 35 airports are carbon neutral – the latest to reach this level was Helsinki Airport. There are now 28 carbon neutral airports in Europe, 5 in Asia, 1 in North America and 1 in Africa.

=== Europe ===
As of June 2025, there are 286 airports in Europe with Carbon Accreditation.

Level of Accreditation	Number of Airports
Level 1	32
Level 2	98
Level 3	64
Level 3+	21
Level 4	15
Level 4+	36
Level 5	20
Grand Total	286

==== Level 1 Accreditation - Europe ====
32 total airports in Europe have Level 1 Accreditation, with Greece having 14 of them.

- Aktion Airport, Greece
- Batumi Airport, Georgia
- Chania Airport, Crete, Greece
- Corfu International Airport, Greece
- Dinard Bretagne Airport, France
- Dresden Airport, Germany
- Gdansk Lech Walesa Airport, Poland
- Inverness Airport, United Kingdom
- Kavala Airport, Greece
- Kefalonia Airport, Greece
- Kos International Airport, Greece
- Kristiansand Airport, Norway
- Leipzig/Halle Airport, Germany
- Lleida – Alguaire Airport, Spain
- Milas-Bodrum Airport, Turkey
- Mitilini Airport, Greece
- Mykonos Airport, Greece
- Podgorica Airport, Montenegro
- Ramon Airport, Israel
- Rhodes Airport, Greece
- Samos Airport, Greece
- Santiago-Rosalía de Castro Airport, Spain
- Santorini Airport, Greece
- Sarajevo International Airport, Bosnia and Herzegovina
- Sibiu International Airport, Romania
- Skiathos Airport, Greece
- Thessaloniki Airport, Greece
- Tivat Airport, Montenegro
- Warsaw Chopin Airport, Poland
- Zadar Airport, Croatia
- Zakynthos Airport, Greece
- Zvartnots International Airport, Armenia

Country	Number of Level 1 Airports
Armenia	1
Bosnia and Herzegovina	1
Croatia	1
France	1
Georgia	1
Germany	2
Greece	14
Israel	1
Montenegro	2
Norway	1
Poland	2
Romania	1
Spain	2
Turkey	1
United Kingdom	1

==== Level 2 Accreditation - Europe ====
There are 98 airports in Europe with Level 2 Accreditation. Turkey and France make up the majority of Level 2 Accredited airports with 43 and 24, respectively.

- Adana Airport, Turkey (discontinued in 2024)
- Adiyaman Airport, Turkey
- Aéroport Béziers Cap d’Agde, France
- Aéroport d’Ajaccio Napoléon Bonaparte, France
- Aéroport de Rouen-Vallée de Seine, France
- Ağrı Ahmed-i Hani Airport, Turkey
- Albert Picardie Airport, France
- Alghero Airport, Italy
- Amasya Merzifon Airport, Turkey
- Andorra – La Seu d’Urgell Airport, Spain
- Angoulême Airport, France
- Annecy Haute Savoie Mont-Blanc Airport, France
- Antwerp International Airport, Belgium
- Auch-Gers Airport, France
- Aurillac-Tronquières Airport, France
- Avignon Provence Airport, France
- Balikesir Koca Seyit Airport, Turkey
- Balıkesir Merkez Airport, Turkey
- Batman Airport, Turkey
- Billund Airport, Denmark
- Bingöl Airport, Turkey
- Bournemouth Airport, United Kingdom
- Brest Bretagne Airport, France
- Brive Dordogne Valley Airport, France
- Bucharest Băneasa – Aurel Vlaicu International Airport, Romania
- Burgas Airport, Bulgaria
- Bursa Yenisehir Airport, Turkey
- Caen – Carpiquet Airport, France
- Cagliari Airport, Italy
- Canakkale Airport, Turkey
- Çanakkale Gökçeada Airport, Turkey
- Carcassonne Airport, France
- Castellón Airport, Spain
- Cluj Avram Iancu International Airport, Romania
- Cologne Bonn Airport, Germany
- Courchevel Altiport, France
- Deauville – Saint – Gatien Airport, France
- Denizli Çardak Airport, Turkey
- Diyarbakır Airport, Turkey
- Dubrovnik Airport, Croatia
- Elazığ Airport, Turkey
- Erzincan Airport, Turkey
- Exeter & Devon Airport, United Kingdom
- Florence Airport, Italy
- Gaziantep Airport, Turkey
- Gazipaşa-Alanya Airport, Turkey
- Hakkâri Yüksekova Selahaddin Eyyübi Airport, Turkey
- Hatay Airport, Turkey
- Heydar Aliyev International Airport, Azerbaijan
- Iğdır Şehit Bülent Aydın Airport, Turkey
- Isparta Süleyman Demirel Airport, Turkey
- Kahramanmaras Airport, Turkey
- Kars Harakani Airport, Turkey
- Kastamonu Airport, Turkey
- Kaunas Airport, Lithuania
- Kayseri Airport, Turkey
- Kocaeli Cengiz Topel Airport, Turkey
- Konya Airport, Turkey
- Lanzarote Airport, Spain
- Le Mans-Arnage Airport, France
- Lille Airport, France
- Limoges Airport, France
- Ljubljana Airport, Slovenia
- London Biggin Hill Airport, United Kingdom
- Lorient Airport, France
- Lycksele Airport, Sweden
- Malatya Airport, Turkey
- Mardin Airport, Turkey
- Memmingen Airport, Germany
- Muş Sultan Alparslan Airport, Turkey
- Nevşehir Kapadokya Airport, Turkey
- Norwich Airport, United Kingdom
- Ordu-Giresun Airport, Turkey
- Orléans Loire-Valley International Airport, France
- Ostend-Bruges International Airport, Belgium
- Palanga Airport, Lithuania
- Pays d’Ancenis Airport, France
- People’s Airport St.Gallen-Altenrhein, Switzerland
- Perpignan–Rivesaltes Airport, France
- Pisa International Airport, Italy
- Poitiers Biard Airport, France
- Rodez Aveyron Airport, France
- Samsun Çarşamba Airport, Turkey
- Şanlıurfa GAP Airport, Turkey
- Shannon Airport, Ireland
- Siirt Airport, Turkey
- Sinop Airport, Turkey
- Şırnak Şerafettin Elçi Airport, Turkey
- Sivas Nuri Demirag Airport, Turkey
- Skopje International Airport, North Macedonia
- Tbilisi International Airport, Georgia
- Tekirdağ Çorlu Airport, Turkey
- Tel Aviv Ben Gurion International Airport, Israel
- Tokat Airport, Turkey
- Trabzon Airport, Turkey
- Uşak Airport, Turkey
- Van Ferit Melen Airport, Turkey
- Varna Airport, Bulgaria

Europe Level 2 Accreditations by Country
Country	Number of Level 2 Airports
Azerbaijan	1
Belgium	2
Bulgaria	2
Croatia	1
Denmark	1
France	24
Georgia	1
Germany	2
Ireland	1
Israel	1
Italy	4
Lithuania	2
North Macedonia	1
Romania	2
Slovenia	1
Spain	3
Sweden	1
Switzerland	1
Turkey	43
United Kingdom	4

==== Level 3 Accreditation - Europe ====
There are 64 airports in Europe with Level 3 Accreditation. France has 24 Level 3 accredited airports.

- Aalborg Airport, Denmark
- Adolfo Suárez Madrid–Barajas Airport, Spain
- Aéroport De Chalon Champforgeuil, France
- Aix Les Milles Airport, France
- Alicante-Elche Airport, Spain
- Angers Loire Airport, France
- Auxerre Airport, France
- Barcelona-El Prat Airport, Spain
- Belfast International Airport, United Kingdom
- Belgrade Airport, Serbia
- Bergen Airport, Norway
- Bergerac Dordogne Périgord Airport, France
- Berlin Brandenburg Airport, Germany
- Birmingham Airport, United Kingdom
- Bordeaux-Mérignac Airport, France
- Bourges Airport, France
- Bucharest Henri Coandă International Airport, Romania
- Catania Airport, Italy
- Chambéry Airport, France
- Cherbourg Maupertus Airport, France
- Clermont-Ferrand Auvergne Airport, France
- Dalaman Airport, Turkey
- Dijon Bourgogne Airport, France
- Dole Jura Airport, France
- Düsseldorf International Airport, Germany
- Erzurum Airport, Turkey
- Frankfurt Airport, Germany
- George Best Belfast City Airport, United Kingdom
- Grenoble Alpes Isère Airport, France
- Ibiza Airport, Spain
- Ireland West Airport Knock Airport, Ireland
- Jersey Airport, United Kingdom
- Kalmar Oland Airport, Sweden
- Leeds Bradford Airport, United Kingdom
- Maastricht Aachen Airport, Netherlands
- Málaga-Costa del Sol Airport, Spain
- Malta International Airport, Malta
- Menorca Airport, Spain
- Milan Bergamo Airport, Italy
- Montpellier-Méditerranée Airport, France
- Munich Airport, Germany
- Nîmes Alès Camargue Cévennes Airport, France
- Olbia Costa Smeralda Airport, Italy
- Oslo Airport, Norway
- Palma de Mallorca Airport, Spain
- Pau Pyrenees Airport, France
- Prague Airport, Czech Republic
- Reims-Champagne Airport, France
- Rennes Bretagne Airport, France
- Riga International Airport, Latvia
- Saint-Nazaire Montoir Airport, France
- Stavanger Airport, Norway
- Strasbourg Airport, France
- Stuttgart Airport, Germany
- Tallinn Airport, Estonia
- Tarbes–Lourdes–Pyrénées Airport, France
- Tirana International Airport Nënë Tereza, Albania
- Toulouse Francazal Airport, France
- Tours Val de Loire Airport, France
- Trieste Airport, Italy
- Trondheim Airport Værnes, Norway
- Troyes-Barberey Airport, France
- Vilnius Airport, Lithuania
- Zagreb Airport, Croatia

Europe Level 3 Accreditations by Country
Countries	Number of Level 3 Airports
Albania	1
Croatia	1
Czech Republic	1
Denmark	1
Estonia	1
France	24
Germany	5
Ireland	1
Italy	4
Latvia	1
Lithuania	1
Malta	1
Netherlands	1
Norway	4
Romania	1
Serbia	1
Spain	7
Sweden	1
Turkey	2
United Kingdom	5

Level 3+ Accreditation - Europe

There are 21 airports in Europe with Level 3+ Accreditation. The United Kingdom and Italy make up nearly half of these (48%) with 6 and 4 airports, respectively, with Level 2 Accreditation in Europe.

- Aberdeen Airport, United Kingdom
- Ängelholm Helsingborg Airport, Sweden
- Antalya Airport, Turkey
- Cork Airport, Ireland
- Dublin Airport, Ireland
- East Midlands Airport, United Kingdom
- Glasgow Airport, United Kingdom
- Hamburg Airport, Germany
- Izmir Adnan Menderes International Airport, Turkey
- Keflavik International Airport, Iceland
- London Stansted Airport, United Kingdom
- Manchester Airport, United Kingdom
- Palermo Airport, Italy
- Prishtina International Airport ‘Adem Jashari’, Kosovo
- Southampton Airport, United Kingdom
- Sundsvall-Timrå Airport, Sweden
- Torino Airport, Italy
- Toulouse-Blagnac Airport, France
- Treviso Airport, Italy
- Verona Airport, Italy
- Vienna Airport, Austria

Europe Level 3+ Accreditations by Country
Countries	Number of Level 3+ Airports
Austria	1
France	1
Germany	1
Iceland	1
Ireland	2
Italy	4
Kosovo	1
Sweden	2
Turkey	2
United Kingdom	6

==== Level 4 Accreditation - Europe ====
There are 15 airports in Europe with Level 4 Accreditation.

- Brussels South Charleroi Airport, Belgium
- Donegal Airport, Ireland
- EuroAirport Airport Basel Mulhouse Freiburg, France
- Istanbul Airport, Turkey
- Liege Airport, Belgium
- London Luton Airport, United Kingdom
- Marseille Provence Airport, France
- Nantes Atlantique Airport, France
- Newcastle International Airport, United Kingdom
- Paris-Beauvais Airport, France
- Paris-Charles de Gaulle Airport, France
- Paris-Le Bourget Airport, France
- Paris-Orly Airport, France
- Vasil Levski Sofia Airport, Bulgaria
- Zurich Airport, Switzerland

Europe Level 4 Accreditations by Country
Countries	Number of Level 4 Airports
Belgium	2
Bulgaria	1
France	7
Ireland	1
Switzerland	1
Turkey	1
United Kingdom	2

==== Level 4+ Accreditation - Europe ====
There are 39 airports in Europe with Level 4+ Accreditation.

- Ankara Esenboga International Airport, Turkey
- Åre Östersund Airport, Sweden
- Athens International Airport, Greece
- Bologna Airport, Italy
- Bristol Airport, United Kingdom
- Brussels Airport, Belgium
- Budapest Airport, Hungary
- Cannes Mandelieu Airport, France
- Copenhagen Airport, Denmark
- Edinburgh Airport, United Kingdom
- Farnborough Airport, United Kingdom
- Faro Airport, Portugal
- Flores Airport, Portugal
- Geneva Airport, Switzerland
- Heathrow Airport, United Kingdom
- Horta Airport, Portugal
- Kiruna Airport, Sweden
- Larnaka International Airport, Cyprus
- Leonardo da Vinci-Fiumicino Airport, Italy
- Lisbon Airport, Portugal
- London City, United Kingdom
- London Gatwick, United Kingdom
- Luleå Airport, Sweden
- Luxembourg Airport, Luxembourg
- Lyon-Bron Airport, France
- Lyon-Saint Exupéry Airport, France
- Milano Linate Airport, Italy
- Milano Malpensa Airport, Italy
- Nice Côte d’Azur Airport, France
- Paphos International Airport, Cyprus
- Porto Airport, Portugal
- Porto Santo Airport, Portugal
- Rome Ciampino Airport, Italy
- Saint Tropez Airport, France
- Santa Maria Airport, Portugal
- Stockholm-Bromma Airport, Sweden
- Umea Airport, Sweden
- Venezia Airport, Italy
- Visby Airport, Sweden

Europe Level 4+ Accreditations by Country
Countries	Number of Level 4+ Airports
Belgium	1
Cyprus	2
Denmark	1
France	5
Greece	1
Hungary	1
Italy	6
Luxembourg	1
Portugal	7
Sweden	6
Switzerland	1
Turkey	1
United Kingdom	6

==== Level 5 Accreditation - Europe ====
There are 17 airports in Europe with Level 4+ Accreditation.

- Amsterdam Airport Schiphol, Netherlands
- Beja Airport, Portugal
- Eindhoven Airport, Netherlands
- Göteborg Landvetter Airport, Sweden
- Helsinki Airport, Finland
- Ivalo Airport, Finland
- Kittilä Airport, Finland
- Kuusamo Airport, Finland
- Madeira Airport, Portugal
- Malmö Airport, Sweden
- Naples International Airport, Italy
- Ponta Delgada Airport, Portugal
- Ronneby Airport, Sweden
- Rotterdam The Hague Airport, Netherlands
- Rovaniemi Airport, Finland
- Stockholm-Arlanda Airport, Sweden
- Toulon Hyères Airport, France

Europe Level 5 Accreditations by Country
Countries	Number of Level 4+ Airports
Finland	5
France	1
Italy	1
Netherlands	3
Portugal	3
Sweden	4

=== Asia Pacific ===
Delhi's Indira Gandhi International Airport was the first carbon neutral airport in Asia-Pacific region. There are now 38 carbon neutral airports with recent entrants including Gold Coast and Hobart (both in Australia) as well as Muscat International Airport and Nadi International Airport (Fiji) – which have all started their journey to active carbon management, becoming accredited at Level 1 Mapping. Mumbai International Airport and Bangalore International Airport are the latest airports to become carbon neutral in the region.

==== Level 1 Accreditation - Asia Pacific ====
- Abha International Airport, Saudi Arabia
- Al Jouf Airport, Saudi Arabia
- Al Wajh Airport, Saudi Arabia
- Al-Ula International Airport, Saudi Arabia
- Arar Domestic Airport, Saudi Arabia
- Bisha Airport, Saudi Arabia
- Dawadmi Airport, Saudi Arabia
- Duqm International Airport, Oman
- Essendon Airport, Australia
- Gurayat Airport, Saudi Arabia
- Hail International Airport, Saudi Arabia
- Invercargill Airport, New Zealand
- King Abdullah bin Abdulaziz International Airport, Saudi Arabia
- King Fahd International Airport, Saudi Arabia
- King Saud Bin Abdulaziz Airport, Saudi Arabia
- Kota Kinabalu International Airport, Malaysia
- Langkawi International Airport, Malaysia
- Mactan-Cebu International Airport, Philippines
- Muscat International Airport, Oman
- Najran Airport, Saudi Arabia
- Nelson Airport, New Zealand
- Neom Bay Airport, Saudi Arabia
- Prince Abdul Mohsin Bin Abdulaziz International Airport, Saudi Arabia
- Prince Naif Bin Abdulaziz International Airport, Saudi Arabia
- Prince Sultan bin Abdulaziz Airport, Saudi Arabia
- Rabigh Airport, Saudi Arabia
- Rafha Airport, Saudi Arabia
- Rarotonga International Airport, Cook Islands
- Sharurah Airport, Saudi Arabia
- Taif International Airport, Saudi Arabia
- Turaif Airport, Saudi Arabia
- Wadi Al Dawasir Airport, Saudi Arabia

==== Level 2 Accreditation - Asia Pacific ====
- Aurangabad Airport, India
- Biju Patnaik International Airport Bhubaneswar, India
- Birsa Munda Airport Ranchi, India
- Broome International Airport, Australia
- Calicut International Airport, India
- Chennai International Airport, India
- Coimbatore International Airport, India
- Devi Ahilya Bai Holkar Airport Indore, India
- Dibrugarh Airport, India
- Gold Coast Airport, Australia
- Hubballi Airport, India
- Imphal International Airport, India
- Jay Prakash Narayan International Airport Patna, India
- Jolly Grant Airport Dehradun, India
- King Abdulaziz International Airport, Saudi Arabia
- La Tontouta International Airport, France
- Lal Bahadur Shastri International Airport Varanasi, India
- Longreach Airport, Australia
- Macau International Airport, China
- Madurai Airport, India
- Maharana Pratap Airport Udaipur, India
- MBB Agartala Airport, India
- Mount Isa Airport, Australia
- Netaji Subhash Chandra Bose International Airport Kolkata, India
- New Plymouth Airport, New Zealand
- Port Hedland International Airport, Australia
- Prince Mohammad bin Abdulaziz International Airport, Saudi Arabia
- Raja Bhoj Airport Bhopal, India
- Rajahmundry Airport, India
- SGRDJ International Airport Amritsar, India
- Surat Airport, India
- Swami Vivekananda Airport Raipur, India
- Tahiti Faa’a International Airport, French Polynesia
- Tiruchirapalli International Airport, India
- Tirupati Airport, India
- Townsville Airport, Australia
- Vadodara Airport, India
- Vijayawada International Airport, India

==== Level 3 Accreditation - Asia Pacific ====
- Abu Dhabi International Airport, United Arab Emirates
- Darwin International Airport, Northern Territory, Australia
- Dubai World Central Airport, United Arab Emirates
- Dunedin International Airport, New Zealand
- Hamad International Airport, Doha, Qatar
- Kaohsiung International Airport, Taiwan
- Kuala Lumpur International Airport, Malaysia
- Melbourne Airport, Melbourne, Victoria, Australia
- Perth Airport, Western Australia
- Phnom Penh International Airport, Cambodia
- Salalah International Airport, Oman
- Sihanoukville International Airport, Cambodia
- Singapore Changi Airport, Singapore

==== Level 3+ Accreditation - Asia Pacific ====
- Sharjah International Airport, United Arab Emirates
- Sunshine Coast Airport, Queensland, Australia

==== Level 4 Accreditation - Asia Pacific ====
- Adelaide Airport, Adelaide, Australia
- Auckland International Airport, New Zealand
- Bahrain International Airport, Bahrain
- Brisbane Airport, Australia
- Canberra Airport, Australia
- Chubu Centrair International Airport, Japan
- Dubai International Airport, United Arab Emirates
- Hamilton Airport, New Zealand
- Hong Kong International Airport, China
- Incheon International Airport, South Korea
- Kansai International Airport, Japan
- King Khalid International Airport, Saudi Arabia
- Kobe Airport, Japan
- Nadi International Airport, Fiji
- Narita International Airport, Japan
- Osaka International Airport, Japan
- Palmerston North Airport, New Zealand
- Parafield Airport, Australia
- Sydney International Airport, Australia
- Taoyuan International Airport, Chinese Taipei

==== Level 4+ Accreditation - Asia Pacific ====
- Chhatrapati Shivaji Maharaj International Airport, India
- Hawke’s Bay Airport, New Zealand
- Newcastle Airport, Australia
- Queen Alia International Airport, Jordan
- Queenstown Airport, New Zealand
- Wellington International Airport, New Zealand

==== Level 5 Accreditation - Asia Pacific ====
- Christchurch Airport, New Zealand
- Indira Gandhi International Airport, India
- Kempegowda International Airport, India
- Rajiv Gandhi International Airport, India

=== Africa ===
As of 2024, there are 32 airports in Africa with Carbon Accreditation. Enfidha-Hammamet International Airport in Tunisia was the first to achieve Level 1 accreditation in 2013. Aéroport Felix Houphouet Boigny in Côte D'Ivoire (Ivory Coast) was the first airport in Africa to reach Level 4+ accreditation. The listing is as follows:

==== Level 1 Accreditation - Africa ====
14 airports including:

- Antananarivo Ivato International, Madagascar
- Aéroport international de Nosy Be-Fascene, Madagascar
- Bram Fischer International Airport, South Africa
- Eldoret International Airport, Kenya
- Fes Sais International Airport, Morocco
- George Airport, South Africa
- Gnassingbé Eyadéma International, Togo
- Jomo Kenyatta International Airport, Kenya
- Kigali International Airport, Rwanda
- Kisumu International Airport, Kenya
- Moi International Airport, Kenya
- Murtala Muhammed International Airport, Nigeria
- Rabat–Salé Airport, Morocco
- Saint Helena Airport, Saint Helena

==== Level 2 Accreditation - Africa ====
8 airports including:

- Aéroport de Pierrefonds, Réunion
- Cape Town International Airport, South Africa
- King Shaka International Airport, South Africa
- Marrakesh Menara Airport, Morocco
- Mohammed V International Airport, Morocco
- Monastir Habib Bourguiba, Tunisia
- OR Tambo International Airport, South Africa
- Sir Seewoosagur Ramgoolam International Airport, Mauritius

==== Level 3 Accreditation - Africa ====
4 airports including:

- Aéroport de Dakar-Blaise Diagne, Senegal
- Aéroport de la Réunion - Roland Garros, La Reunion
- L'Aéroport International de Dzaoudzi-Pamandzi, Mayotte
- Port Elizabeth National Airport, South Africa

Level 3+ Accreditation - Africa

2 airports including:

- Aéroport international de Brazzaville Maya-Maya, Republic of the Congo
- Aéroport International Léon-Mba, Gabon

==== Level 4 Accreditation - Africa ====
1 airport:

- Enfidha Hammamet International, Tunisia

Level 4+ Accreditation - Africa

1 airport:

- Aéroport Felix Houphouet Boigny, Côte D'Ivoire

=== North America ===
There are 91 accredited airports in North America:

Level of Accreditation	Number of Airports
Level 1	28
Level 2	26
Level 3	26
Level 3+	1
Level 4	7
Level 4+	3
Grand Total	91

==== Level 1 Accreditation - North America ====
There are 28 airports in North America with Level 1 Accreditation - 19 in the United States and 9 in Canada.

- Aéroport Trois-Rivières, Canada
- Albany International Airport, New York United States
- Albuquerque International Sunport, New Mexico, United States
- Billy Bishop Toronto City Airport, Toronto, Ontario, Canada
- Boston Logan International Airport, Boston, Massachusetts, United States
- Calgary International Airport, Calgary, Alberta, Canada
- Charlotte Douglas International Airport, Charlotte, North Carolina, United States
- Cincinnati/North Kentucky International Airport, Cincinnati, Ohio, United States
- Ellington Airport, Houston, Texas, United States
- Fredericton International Airport, New Brunswick, Canada
- Harry Reid International Airport, Las Vegas, Nevada, United States
- Hartsfield-Jackson Atlanta International Airport, Atlanta, Georgia, United States
- Henderson Executive Airport, Henderson, Nevada, United States
- Hilo Airport, Hilo, Hawaii, United States
- John C. Munro Hamilton International Airport, Hamilton, Ontario, Canada
- Kahului Airport, Kahului, Hawaii, United States
- Louisville Muhammad Ali International Airport, Louisville, Kentucky, United States
- Miami International Airport, Miami, Florida, United States
- Montreal Metropolitan Airport, Canada
- Naples Municipal Airport, Naples, Florida, United States
- North Las Vegas Airport, Las Vegas, Nevada, United States
- Patrick Leahy Burlington International Airport, Burlington, Vermont, United States
- Plant City Airport, Hillsborough County, Florida United States
- Region of Waterloo International Airport, Canada
- Saint John Airport, New Brunswick Canada
- South Valley Regional Airport, Salt Lake City, Utah, United States
- St. John’s International Airport, Canada
- Tooele Valley Airport, Toole, Utah, United States

==== Level 2 Accreditation - North America ====
There are 26 airports in North America with Level 2 Accreditation - 17 in the United States and 9 in Canada.

- Comox Valley Airport, Canada
- Edmonton International Airport, Alberta, Canada
- Fort McMurray International Airport, Alberta, Canada
- George Bush Intercontinental Airport, Houston, Texas, United States
- Gerald R. Ford International Airport, Michigan, United States
- Greater Moncton Romeo LeBlanc International Airport, New Brunswick Canada
- Hollywood Burbank Airport, California, United States
- Jackson Hole Airport, Wyoming, United States
- John Glenn Columbus International Airport, Ohio, United States
- King County International Airport-Boeing Field, Seattle, Washington, United States
- Long Beach Airport, California, United States
- Nanaimo Airport, British Columbia, Canada
- Norman Y. Mineta San Jose International Airport, California, United States
- Northeast Philadelphia Airport, United States
- Peter O. Knight Airport, Tampa, Florida, United States
- Pittsburgh International Airport, Pennsylvania, United States
- Regina International Airport, Canada
- San Antonio International Airport, Texas, United States
- San Luis Obispo County Regional Airport, California, United States
- Saskatoon International Airport, Canada
- Stinson Municipal Airport, Texas, United States
- Tampa Executive Airport, Florida, United States
- Tampa International Airport, Florida, United States
- Thunder Bay International Airport, Ontario, Canada
- Victoria International Airport, British Columbia, Canada
- William P. Hobby Airport, Houston, Texas, United States

==== Level 3 Accreditation - North America ====
There are 26 airports in North America with Level 3 Accreditation - 20 in the United States and 6 in Canada.

- Charlottetown Airport, Canada
- Daniel K. Inouye International Airport, Hawaii, United States
- Detroit Metro Airport, United States
- Downtown Heliport, United States
- Eagle Creek Airpark, United States
- Halifax Stanfield International Airport, Canada
- Hendricks County Airport-Gordon Graham Field, United States
- Indianapolis International Airport, United States
- Indianapolis Regional Airport, United States
- John F. Kennedy International Airport, New York City, New York, United States
- Kelowna International Airport, Canada
- Kona Airport, United States
- LaGuardia International Airport, United States
- Lihue Airport, United States
- Metropolitan Airport, Baton Rouge, Louisiana, United States
- Minneapolis St Paul Airport, Minnesota, United States
- Newark Liberty International Airport, New Jersey, United States
- Oakland International Airport, United States
- Ottawa Macdonald-Cartier International Airport, Canada
- Philadelphia International Airport, United States
- Québec City Jean Lesage International Airport, Canada
- Salt Lake City International Airport, Utah, United States
- Seattle-Tacoma International Airport, United States
- Stewart International Airport, United States
- Teterboro Airport, United States
- Winnipeg James Armstrong Richardson International Airport, Canada

==== Level 3+ Accreditation - North America ====
There is 1 airport in North America with Level 4 Accreditation - 1 in the USA and none in Canada.

- Austin-Bergstrom International Airport, Austin, Texas, United States

==== Level 4 Accreditation - North America ====
There are 7 airports in North America with Level 4 Accreditation - 5 in the USA and 2 in Canada.

- Dallas Love Field Airport, Dallas, Texas, United States
- Los Angeles International Airport, California, United States
- Los Angeles Van Nuys Airport, California, United States
- Montreal-Pierre Elliott Trudeau International Airport, Canada
- Phoenix Sky Harbor International Airport, Arizona, United States
- San Francisco International Airport, California, United States
- Toronto Pearson International Airport, Canada

==== Level 4 Accreditation - North America ====
There are 3 airports in North America with Level 4+ Accreditation - 2 in the USA and one in Canada.

- Dallas Fort Worth International Airport, Texas, United States
- San Diego International Airport, California, United States
- Vancouver International Airport, Richmond, British Columbia Canada

=== Latin America and Caribbean ===
There are currently 105 certified airports in the region of Latin American and Caribbean as of June 2025.

Level of Accreditation	Number of Airports
Level 1	30
Level 2	21
Level 3	43
Level 3+	5
Level 4	4
Level 4+	2
Grand Total	105

==== Level 1 Accreditation - Latin America and Caribbean ====
- Afonso Pena International Airport, Brazil
- Amado Nervo National Airport, Mexico
- Bariloche Airport, Argentina
- Ciudad del Carmen International Airport, Mexico
- Ciudad Victoria International Airport, Mexico
- El Tajín National Airport, Mexico
- Felipe Ángeles International Airport, Mexico
- Foz do Iguaçu International Airport, Brazil
- Goiânia International Airport, Brazil
- Hermanos Serdán International Airport, Mexico
- Jujuy Airport, Argentina
- Licenciado Miguel de la Madrid National Airport, Mexico
- Loreto International Airport, Mexico
- Lynden Pindling International Airport, Bahamas
- Navegantes Airport, Brazil
- Orlando Bezerra de Menezes – Juazeiro do Norte Airport, Brazil
- Paraná Airport, Argentina
- President Castro Pinto – João Pessoa International Airport, Brazil
- President João Suassuna – Campina Grande Airport, Brazil
- Puerto Escondido International Airport, Mexico
- Punta del Este International Airport, Uruguay
- Recife International Airport, Brazil
- Río Grande Airport, Argentina
- Salta Airport, Argentina
- Santa Maria – Aracaju International Airport, Brazil
- Santos Dumont Airport, Brazil
- São Luís–Marechal Cunha Machado International Airport, Brazil
- Tehuacán National Airport, Mexico
- Tucumán Airport, Argentina
- Zumbi dos Palmares – Maceió International Airport, Brazil

==== Level 2 Accreditation - Latin America and Caribbean ====
- Aeropuerto Internacional de Córdoba “Ingeniero Aeronáutico Ambrosio Taravella”, Argentina
- Brasilia International Airport, Brazil
- Carrasco International Airport, Uruguay
- Comodoro Rivadavia Airport, Argentina
- Curaçao International Airport, Curaçao
- Daniel Oduber Quirós International Airport, Costa Rica
- Ezeiza International Airport, Argentina
- Hermosillo International Airport, Mexico
- Iguazu Cataratas Airport, Argentina
- Jorge Newbery Airfield Buenos Aires, Argentina
- L.F. Wade International Airport, Bermuda
- Los Mochis International Airport, Mexico
- Luis Munoz Marin International Airport, Puerto Rico
- Mendoza El Plumerillo Airport, Argentina
- Montego Bay Sangster Airport, Jamaica
- Norman Manley International Airport, Jamaica
- Pisco Airport, Peru
- Punta Cana International Airport, Dominican Republic
- San Jose Del Cabo International Airport, Mexico
- Santiago Arturo Merino Benitez Airport, Chile
- Tijuana International Airport, Mexico

==== Level 3 Accreditation - Latin America and Caribbean ====
- Acapulco International Airport, Mexico
- Aguascalientes International Airport, Mexico
- Arroyo Barril Airport, Dominican Republic
- Cancun Airport, Mexico
- Chihuahua International Airport, Mexico
- Ciudad Juarez Airport, Mexico
- Cozumel International Airport, Mexico
- Culiacan Airport, Mexico
- Durango Airport, Mexico
- Gregorio Luperón International Airport, Dominican Republic
- Guadalajara International Airport, Mexico
- Guanajuato International Airport, Mexico
- Huatulco Airport, Mexico
- Jorge Chávez International Airport, Peru
- La Isabela International Airport, Dominican Republic
- La Paz International Airport, Mexico
- Las Américas International Airport, Dominican Republic
- Manzanillo International Airport, Mexico
- María Montez International Airport, Dominican Republic
- Martinique Aimé Césaire International Airport, Martinique
- Mazatlan Airport, Mexico
- Merida Airport, Mexico
- Mexicali International Airport, Mexico
- Minatitlan Airport, Mexico
- Monterrey Airport, Mexico
- Morelia International Airport, Mexico
- Oaxaca Airport, Mexico
- Pointe-à-Pitre International Airport, France
- Puerto Vallarta International Airport, Mexico
- Queen Beatrix International Airport, Netherlands
- Querétaro International Airport, Mexico
- Reynosa Airport, Mexico
- Rio de Janeiro/Galeão International Airport, Brazil
- Saint Martin Grand Case Airport, France
- Samaná El Catey International Airport, Dominican Republic
- San Luis Potosi Airport, Mexico
- Tampico International Airport, Mexico
- Tapachula Airport, Mexico
- Torreon Airport, Mexico
- Veracruz Airport, Mexico
- Villahermosa Airport, Mexico
- Zacatecas Airport, Mexico
- Zihuatanejo Airport, Mexico

==== Level 3+ Accreditation - Latin America and Caribbean ====
- Belo Horizonte International Airport, Brazil
- Cibao International Airport, Dominican Republic
- Galapagos Ecological Airport, Ecuador
- José Joaquín de Olmedo International Airport, Ecuador
- San José Juan Santamaria International Airport, Costa Rica

==== Level 4 Accreditation - Latin America and Caribbean ====
- Aeroporto de Macaé – Joaquim de Azevedo Mancebo, Brazil
- El Dorado International Airport, Colombia
- Florianópolis International Airport – Hercílio Luz, Brazil
- Vitoria International Airport, Brazil

==== Level 4+ Accreditation - Latin America and Caribbean ====
- Quito International Airport, Ecuador
- Salvador Bahia International Airport, Brazil

== Counting the CO_{2} reduction ==
Airport emissions have been reduced by 55,633 tonnes of CO_{2} in Year 1 of the programme and 55,501 tonnes in Year 2, and 77,782 tonnes in Year 3 as a result. Year 4 of the programme had a CO_{2} reduction of 110,003 tonnes - enough to power 45,949 households for a year.

If 31,894 cars were removed from the roads for one year, it would enable a reduction close to the one achieved by Airport Carbon Accreditation's participants in Year 5.

From July 2014 to June 2015, the programme has allowed a reduction comparable to the annual CO_{2} sequestered by 1,496 acres of forest. We could have powered almost twice as many households as compared to the year 4 result in the sixth consecutive year of the programme. Following years are bound to beat these figures, with a number of accredited airports at high levels rising.
