= Queen Alia International Airport =

Airport serving Amman, Jordan

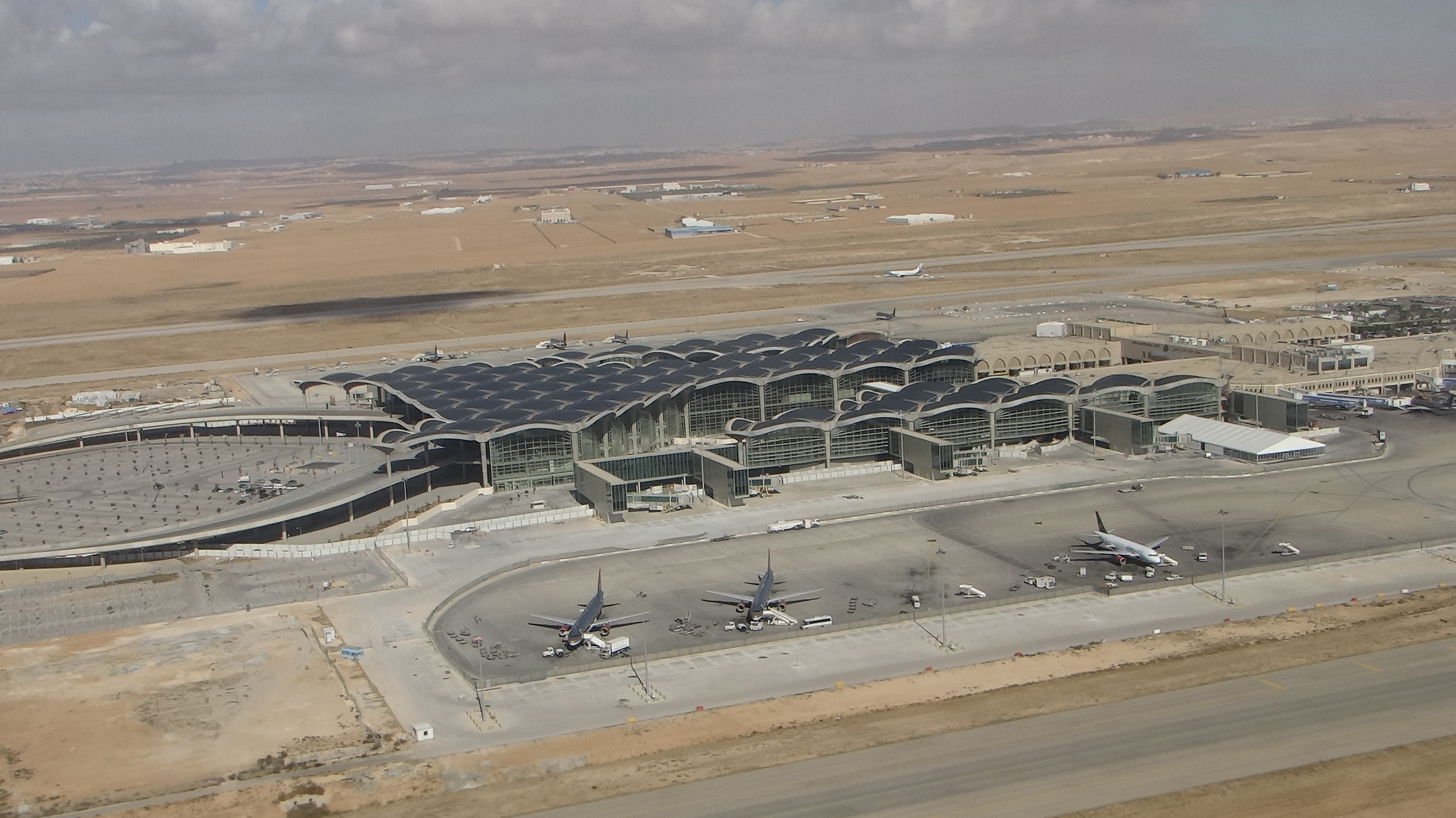
- IATA: AMM; ICAO: OJAI

Summary
- Airport type: Public
- Owner: Government of Jordan
- Operator: AIG Group
- Serves: Amman
- Location: Zizya, Jordan
- Hub for: Royal Jordanian Airlines; Jordan Aviation
- Elevation AMSL: 730 m (2,400 ft)
- Coordinates: 31°43′21″N 35°59′36″E
- Website: www.qaiairport.com

Map
- Airport location in Amman, Jordan.

Runways
Direction	Length		Surface
Direction	ft	m	Surface
08R/26L	12,008	3,660	Concrete
08L/26R	12,008	3,660	Asphalt

Statistics (2022)
- Aircraft movements: 68,325
- Passengers: 7,837,501

Queen Alia International Airport (IATA: AMM, ICAO: OJAI) (Arabic: مطار الملكة علياء الدولي, romanized: Maṭār al-Malika ʿAlyāʾ ad-Dawaliyy) is an international airport located in Zizya, 30 kilometers (18 miles) south of Amman, the capital and largest city of Jordan.

It is the largest airport in the country, named after the country's late Queen Alia, who died in a helicopter crash in 1977. The airport's original terminals were built in 1983, and demolished in 2013, following the inauguration of new terminals. Further terminal were inaugurated in an expansion in 2016.

QAIA is home to the country's flag carrier, Royal Jordanian, and serves as a hub for Jordan Aviation. Since 2022, the airport has dealt with over 7 million passengers annually.

== History ==
The late King Hussein and Queen Alia in 1976, one year before her death in a helicopter crash, after which the airport was renamed in her honour.

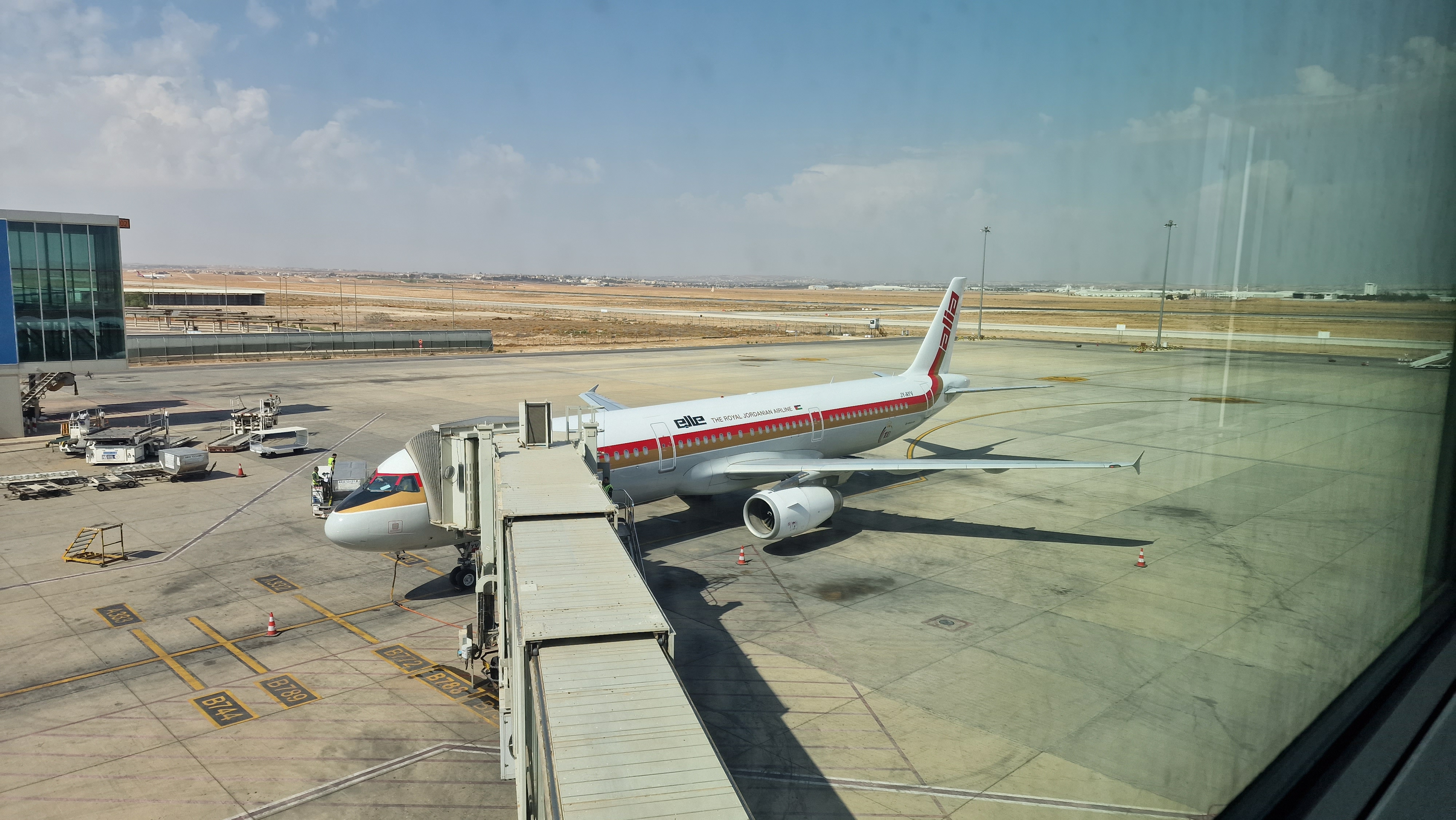
Royal Jordanian aircraft at Queen Alia International Airport

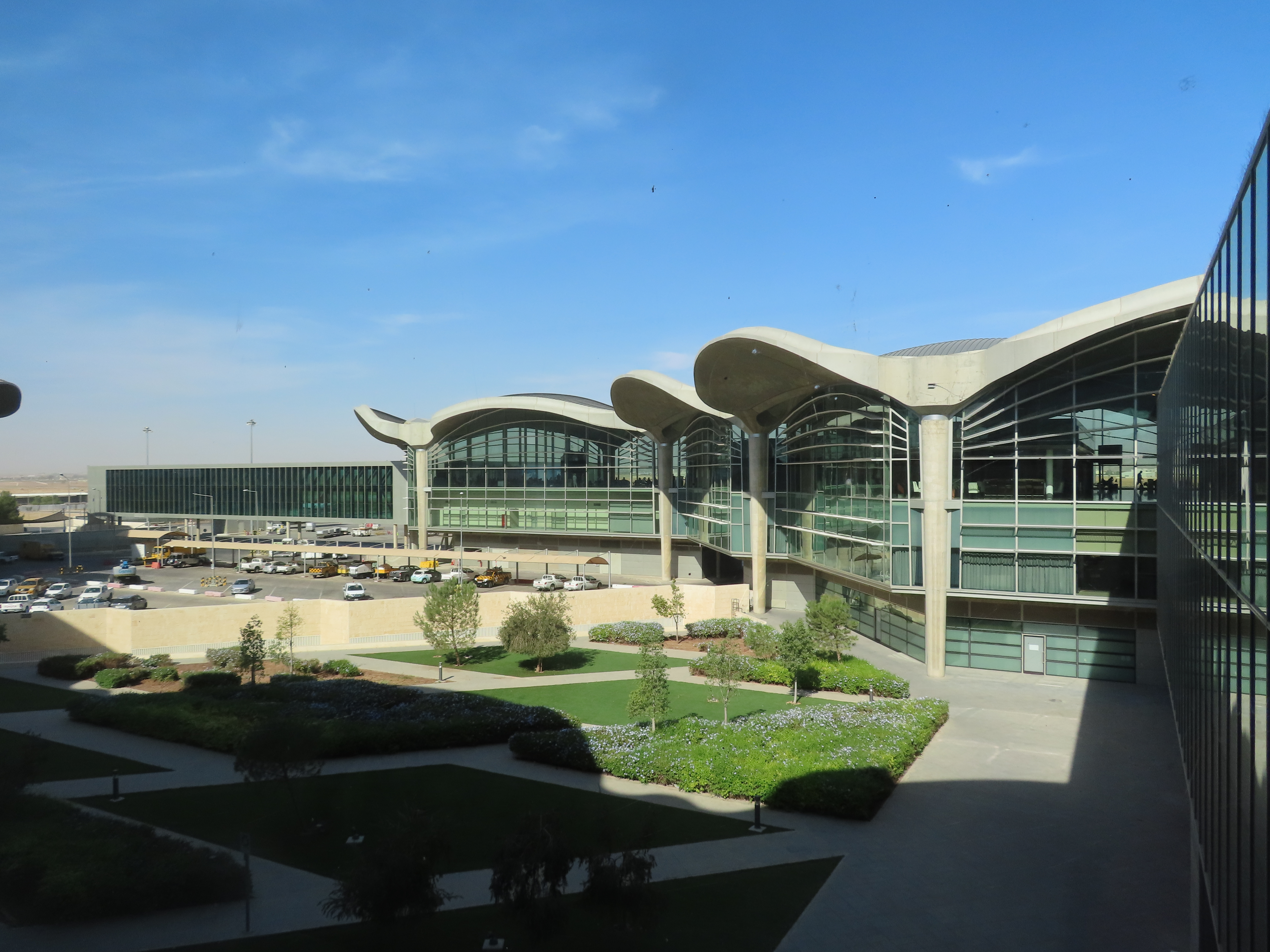
Terminal exterior

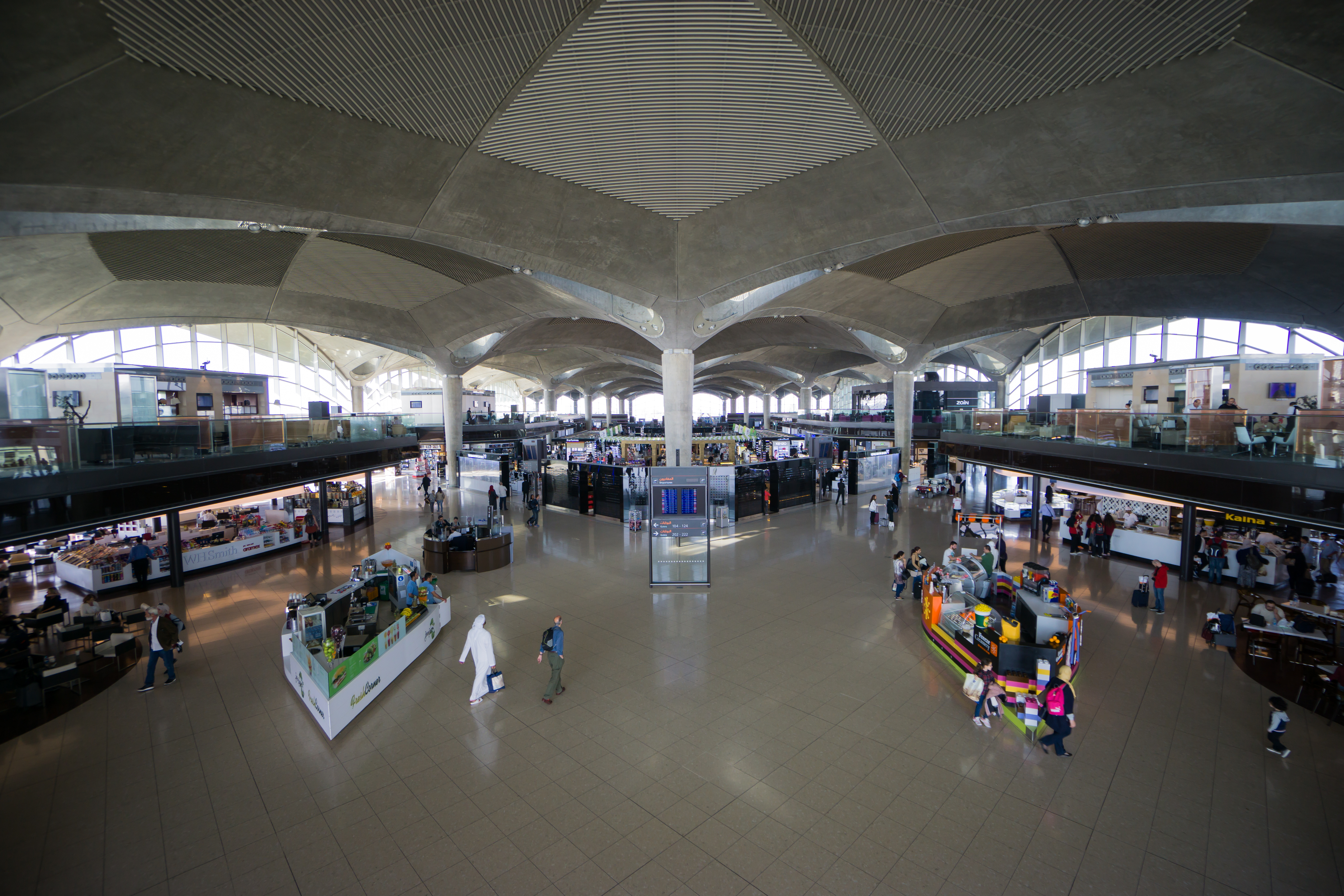
Terminal interior

=== Foundation and early years ===
Queen Alia International Airport (QAIA) was built in 1983 in response to the growing airport traffic needs that Amman Civil Airport could not accommodate. At the time, passenger traffic was increasing at a rate above the international average, recording 25–30% growth per annum and placing considerable pressure on airport facilities despite continuous expansion and development. In 1981, the number of arriving, departing, and transit passengers exceeded 2.3 million, while cargo traffic reached 62,000 tonnes and aircraft traffic topped 27,000 movements.

The Jordanian Ministry of Transport undertook the building of a new international airport with sufficient capacity to cope with demand in the foreseeable future. QAIA was built at an estimated total cost of JOD 84 million (~120 million USD as of January 2023) . Passenger facilities were designed to serve 3.5 million passengers per year. QAIA has since grown to become the kingdom's primary international gateway and a stop-over for international airlines in the Middle East. By 2012, QAIA was serving on average more than 6 million passengers and 40 airlines from around the world.

In 2007, the Government of Jordan selected Airport International Group (AIG) through an open tender to operate, rehabilitate and manage QAIA under a 25-year concession agreement. In response to the continual surge in passenger traffic at the time, AIG was also placed in charge of constructing a new terminal, one which not only would expand the airport's then insufficient annual capacity of 3.5 million passengers, but that would also introduce a "unique travel experience" to help advance QAIA's position as a niche transit hub in the region.

Accordingly, AIG invested an estimated $750 million USD in the construction of the new terminal. The new terminal accommodates rising annual passenger traffic, taking the original airport capacity from 3.5 million passengers per year to 7.5 million.

A new terminal was opened in March 2013 to replace the airport's older two passenger terminals and one cargo terminal. The three original terminals were made obsolete once the new terminal officially began operations. Inaugurated by King Abdullah II on 14 March 2013, the new airport was launched officially following an overnight operational transfer which coincided the airport's 30th anniversary. The last flight departed from the old terminal at 10:05 pm on 20 March 2013, upon which all operations were shifted to the new terminal, where its first flight departed at 2:30 am on 21 March 2013. On 20 January 2014, AIG launched the second phase of QAIA's expansion, valued at a total cost of over $100 million USD.

=== Development since 2015 ===
In 2016, the second expansion phase, costing $1 billion, was completed raising QAIA's annual passenger traffic capacity to 12 million, supporting Jordan's national tourism strategy to serve as a regional transit hub for leisure and business travel. The aim is to boost its capacity to 16 million passengers annually by the end of the concession time frame in 2032. Following the airport expansion, Emirates operated a one-off Airbus A380 service to Amman, celebrating 30 years of Emirates' operation to Jordan. The superjumbo (registration A6-EUC) operated EK901/EK902 on 25 September 2016, and it was the first-ever A380 service to the Levant. Since then, Emirates has continued daily A380 service to Amman through EK903/EK904.

On 14 March 2020, it was announced by the Jordanian Ministry of Health that "...all flights to and from the Kingdom will be suspended from Tuesday, 17 March 2020, until further notice, excluding commercial freight traffic." The airport had been closed to passenger traffic since 17 March 2020 in response to the COVID-19 pandemic. However, several Royal Jordanian flights were commissioned to return Jordanian citizens, especially students, back to Jordan during the pandemic if they desired.

On 8 September 2020, the airport was reopened for commercial flights but was subject to strict health and safety regulations. On 1 March 2022, all travel restrictions regarding the COVID-19 pandemic were subsequently lifted.

== Terminal ==
QAIA's new design was created by architects Foster + Partners. The roof was inspired by Bedouin tents and is composed of 127 concrete domes, each weighing up to 600 metric tonnes.

The airport has three lounges, one operated by Royal Jordanian for business and first-class passengers, one operated by Airport Hotel next to the North Concourse, and the last exclusively run by telecom operator Zain Jordan for its VIP customers. Retail space was expanded by 25% at the new terminal, covering more than 6,000 square metres (65,000 sq ft).

== Airport management ==
Airport International Group (AIG) is a French company formed to rehabilitate, expand, and operate Queen Alia International Airport under a 25-year Build-Operate-Transfer (BOT) concession agreement. The concession was awarded to AIG in 2007 by the Government of Jordan after an open international tender that was overseen by the International Finance Corporation of the World Bank acting as an advisor to the Government. AIG's shareholders are French, Persian Gulf, and Palestinian partners. As of 2018, 51% of the shares are owned by Aéroports de Paris (ADP). The other shareholders are Meridiam Eastern Europe Investments (32%), Mena Airport Holding Ltd. (funded by the IDB; 12.75%), and Edgo (4.75%).

Through the BOT public-private partnership framework, the Government retains ownership of the airport and receives 54.47% of the airport's gross revenues for the first six years and 54.64% of the gross revenues for the remaining 19 years of the agreement's 25-year term.

As part of its public-private partnership with the Government of Jordan, AIG closely collaborates with the Government on a day-to-day basis on all issues related to the airport.

== Airlines and destinations ==
=== Passenger ===
The following airlines operate regular scheduled and charter flights at Amman-Queen Alia Airport:

Airlines	Destinations
Aegean Airlines	Athens
Afriqiyah Airways	Tripoli–Mitiga
Air Algérie	Algiers
Air Arabia	Abu Dhabi, Assiut, Sharjah
Air Cairo	Alexandria, Cairo; Seasonal: Hurghada, Sharm El Sheikh
AJet	Seasonal: Ankara
Austrian Airlines	Vienna
British Airways	London–Heathrow
Dan Air	Bucharest–Otopeni
Egyptair	Cairo
Emirates	Dubai–International
Ethiopian Airlines	Addis Ababa
Etihad Airways	Abu Dhabi
Eurowings	Stuttgart
Flyadeal	Jeddah, Riyadh
FlyAden	Aden
Flydubai	Dubai–International
FlyJordan	Charter: Antalya, Batumi, Istanbul, Sharm El Sheikh
Flynas	Dammam, Riyadh
Gulf Air	Bahrain
Iraqi Airways	Baghdad, Basra, Erbil, Sulaymaniyah
Jordan Aviation	Antalya, Batumi, Cairo, Jeddah, Kuwait City, Moscow–Domodedovo, Muscat, Sharjah, Sharm El Sheikh, Tbilisi, Trabzon; Seasonal charter: Sarajevo, Tirana, Ufa
Kuwait Airways	Kuwait City
Libyan Wings	Tripoli–Mitiga
Lufthansa	Frankfurt
Middle East Airlines	Beirut
Oman Air	Muscat
Pegasus Airlines	Ankara, Antalya, Istanbul–Sabiha Gökçen, Izmir, Trabzon
Qatar Airways	Doha
Royal Jordanian	Abu Dhabi, Aleppo, Algiers, Amsterdam, Aqaba, Athens, Baghdad, Bahrain, Bangkok–Suvarnabhumi, Barcelona, Basra, Beirut, Belgrade (resumes 27 October 2027), Benghazi, Berlin, Brussels, Cairo, Casablanca, Chicago–O'Hare, Dallas/Fort Worth, Damascus, Dammam, Detroit, Doha, Dubai–International, Düsseldorf, Erbil, Frankfurt, Geneva, Hamburg, Istanbul, Jeddah, Kuwait City, Larnaca, London–Heathrow, London–Stansted, Lyon, Madrid, Manchester, Medina, Milan–Malpensa, Montréal–Trudeau, Moscow–Domodedovo, Mumbai, Misrata, Munich, Najaf, New York–JFK, Paphos, Paris–Charles de Gaulle, Riyadh, Rome–Fiumicino, Stockholm–Arlanda, Sharjah, Sulaymaniyah, Tashkent, Thessaloniki, Toronto–Pearson, Tripoli–Mitiga, Tunis, Vienna, Washington–Dulles, Zürich; Seasonal: Al Ula, Antalya, Sharm El Sheikh; Charter: Baku
Ryanair	Bologna, Bucharest–Otopeni, Budapest, Charleroi, Karlsruhe/Baden-Baden, Kraków, Madrid, Memmingen, Milan-Bergamo, Paphos, Paris–Beauvais, Pisa, Poznań, Prague, Rome–Ciampino, Sofia, Vienna; Seasonal: Marseille, Treviso
Saudia	Jeddah, Riyadh
SunExpress	Antalya
TAROM	Bucharest–Otopeni
Turkish Airlines	Istanbul
Wizz Air	Seasonal: Budapest
Yemenia	Aden, Sana'a

=== Cargo ===
Airlines	Destinations
Cargolux	Luxembourg
Lufthansa Cargo	Frankfurt
Royal Jordanian Cargo	Baghdad, Cairo, Dubai–International, Erbil, Karachi, Maastricht/Aachen
Saudia Cargo	Riyadh
Turkish Cargo	Istanbul

== Statistics ==
Passenger numbers
Year	Total passengers	Growth
2002	2,334,779	
2003	2,358,475	1%
2004	2,988,174	21%
2005	3,301,510	9%
2006	3,506,070	6%
2007	3,861,126	9%
2008	4,477,811	14%
2009	4,770,769	6%
2010	5,422,301	12%
2011	5,467,726	1%
2012	6,250,048	13%
2013	6,502,000	4%
2014	7,089,008	9%
2015	7,095,685	0%
2016	7,410,274	4.4%
2017	7,914,704	6.8%
2018	8,425,026	6.5%
2019	8,924,080	5.9%
2020	2,050,883	
2021	4,559,336	
2022	7,837,501	
2023	9,201,269	
2024	8,798,595	

Handled cargo
Year	Total cargo (in tons)	Growth
2016	101,206	
2017	110,416	9.1%
2018	104,216	−6.7%
2019	102,549	−1.6%

Aircraft movements
Year	Total aircraft movements
2007	44,672
2008	51,314
2009	57,726
2010	62,863
2011	63,426
2012	67,190
2014	73,125
2015	73,584
2016	73,784
2017	74,044
2018	76,894
2019	79,740

== Awards ==
In 2023, QAIA became the first airport in the Middle East to achieve Level 3 of the Airport Customer Experience Accreditation (ACEA).

According to a statement from Airport International Group (AIG), QAIA also became one of eight airports in the Middle East and one of sixty one airports all around the world to have received ACEA.

The global Airport Service Quality (ASQ) Survey for Q1 2014 ranked QAIA first place in 18 different service and facility categories from ten airports across the Middle East. QAIA came in at 13th place from amongst 81 airports worldwide within the group of airports serving 5–15 million passengers and recorded an Overall Satisfaction Score of 4.42 out of a possible 5.0, an improvement compared to its 4.23 score in Q4 2013. Regarding luggage delivery speed, QAIA earned a 4.13 score, up from 3.99 during the previous quarter.

QAIA received two 2013 Airport Service Quality (ASQ) Awards in February 2014, ranking at first place in the category of "Best Improvement by Region: Middle East" and 5th in the category of "Best Airport by Region: Middle East." The ASQ Awards results were based on the ASQ Survey, an international airport passenger satisfaction benchmark program. In the 2014 version of the awards, QAIA again received the "Best Improvement in the Middle East region" award.

In March 2013, QAIA was named one of the world's top 40 public–private partnership PPP projects, receiving Gold recognition as "Best Emerging Market Infrastructure Project for Europe, Central Asia, the Middle East, and North Africa" in Emerging Partnerships. The winning PPPs, selected from among projects nominated by governments, industry, NGOs, academia and other organizations following a global call for submissions, demonstrated best practices for governments working with the private sector to provide a wide range of public services and to spur economic development in their countries.

In June 2013, QAIA became the second airport in the Middle East to achieve the "Mapping" level of the Airport Carbon Accreditation program run by Airports Council International Europe. The 'Mapping' level recognizes the airport's commitment to determining its carbon dioxide and other greenhouse gas emission sources at its operational boundary, as well as to engaging a third party to verify the airport's annual carbon footprint.

== Ground transport ==
The airport is connected to Amman by shuttle buses that ply back and forth between Amman and the airport every 30 minutes. An airport taxi service as well as car rental is also available. A shuttle bus is available to transport passengers between the terminal and car park.

Royal Jordanian also operates ground bus services to Damascus.

== See also ==
- Amman Civil Airport
- List of the busiest airports in the Middle East
