= Jordan Aviation =

Jordanian charter airline and lessor

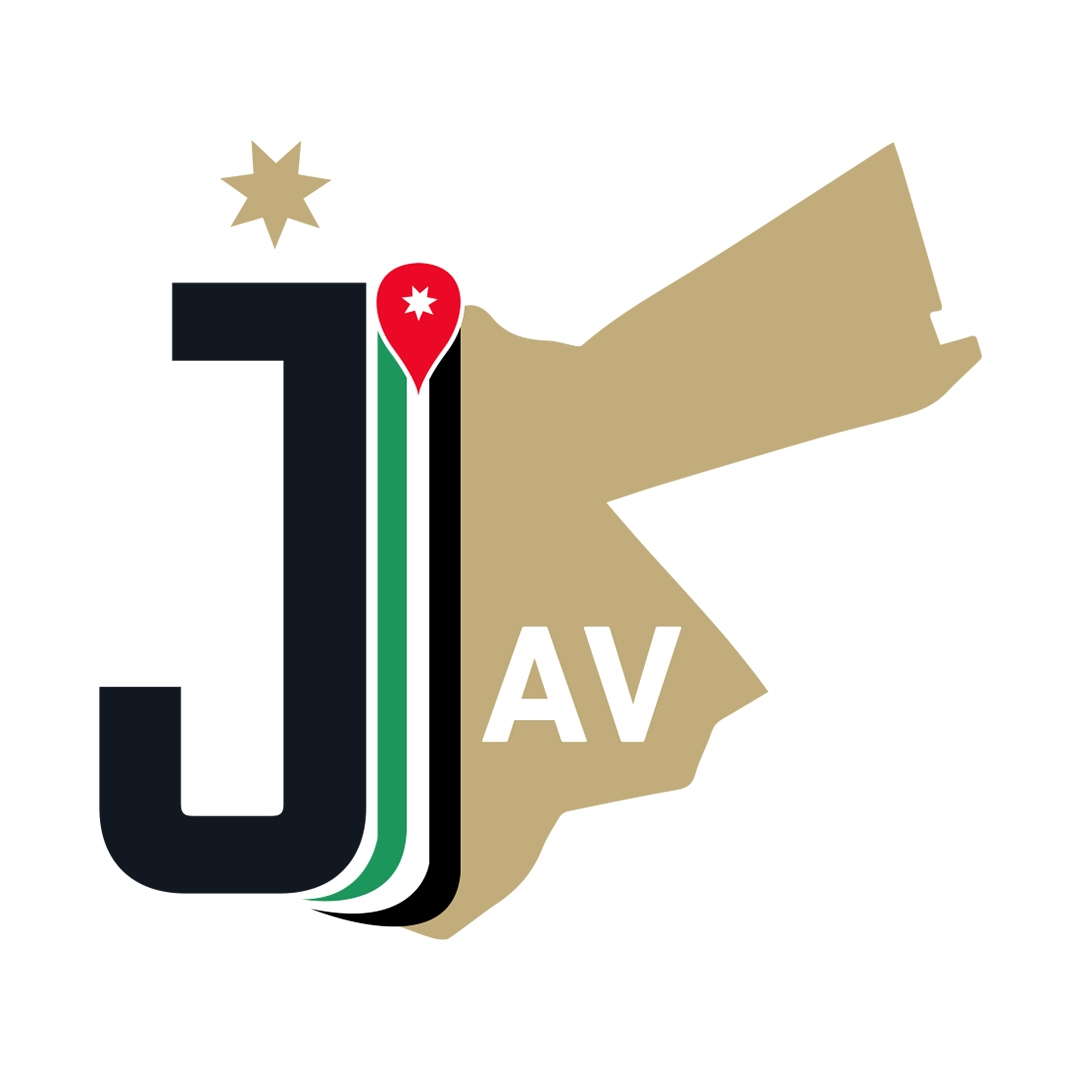
IATA	ICAO	Call sign
R5	JAV	JORDAN AVIATION
- Founded: 1998; 28 years ago
- Hubs: Queen Alia International Airport
- Fleet size: 6
- Destinations: 13
- Parent company: Privately owned by Saudi SWICORP (25%) & Jordanian Businessmen (75%)
- Headquarters: Amman, Jordan
- Key people: Moh'd Al-Khashman
- Website: www.jordanaviation.jo

Jordan Aviation (PSC) is a low cost carrier airline based in Amman, Jordan. It operates worldwide charter flights, provides wet lease services to major airlines seeking additional capacity and is also an important provider of air transportation for UN peacekeeping forces. Its main base is Queen Alia International Airport (AMM/OJAI), Amman from where it operates its fleet of Wide Body and Narrow Body aircraft. In addition it has its own MRO which forms part of its Operations & Technical Centre opened in October 2010.

== History ==
The airline was established as a company in 1998 and gained its Air Operators Certificate in 2000 commencing operations in October of that year. The airline started operations with a Boeing 737-400. It launched services from Amman as the first privately owned charter airline in Jordan. Jordan Aviation operates a varied route network with a worldwide AOC. UN Peacekeepers are carried extensively on the various aircraft in the Fleet and the company also is involved in "wet-leasing" aircraft to air carriers who need extra capacity. Holiday Charter Flights are also operated from its bases in Amman.

Jordan Aviation is owned by Mohamed Al-Khashman (President & Chief Executive Officer) and Hazem Alrasekh, and has over 900 employees (as at June 2012). The company has grown considerably, as the fleet listing below shows. An Airbus A330-200 joined the fleet in March 2012 and this was followed by additional aircraft in the next quarter – an Airbus A320-200 and a Boeing 737-300. Expansion into other market segments is in process.

Following the open sky territory agreement and relaxation of civil aviation regulation in Aqaba, Jordan, the airline shifted its operation to the King Hussein International Airport. The firm launched its inaugural flight from there in 2004. Between 2005 and 2007, Jordan Aviation operated scheduled charter flights from King Hussein International Airport to regional destinations including Kuwait City, Doha, Alexandria, Dubai, Cairo and Manama. Jordan Aviation was also recognized by King Abdullah II as one of the top ten initiatives benefiting the economy of Aqaba.

== Destinations ==
As of February 2021, Jordan Aviation operates to the following destinations:

Country	City	Airport	Notes	Refs
Egypt	Cairo	Cairo International Airport		
Egypt	Sharm El Sheikh	Sharm El Sheikh International Airport		
Georgia	Batumi	Alexander Kartveli Batumi International Airport		
Georgia	Tbilisi	Shota Rustaveli Tbilisi International Airport		
Iraq	Baghdad	Baghdad International Airport	Terminated	
Jordan	Amman	Queen Alia International Airport	Hub	
Oman	Muscat	Muscat International Airport		
Russia	Moscow	Moscow Domodedovo Airport		
Russia	Ufa	Mustai Karim Ufa International Airport	Seasonal charter	
Saudi Arabia	Jeddah	King Abdulaziz International Airport		
Turkey	Antalya	Antalya International Airport		
Turkey	Trabzon	Trabzon Airport		
United Arab Emirates	Dubai	Dubai International Airport	Terminated	
United Arab Emirates	Sharjah	Sharjah International Airport		

== Fleet ==
=== Current fleet ===
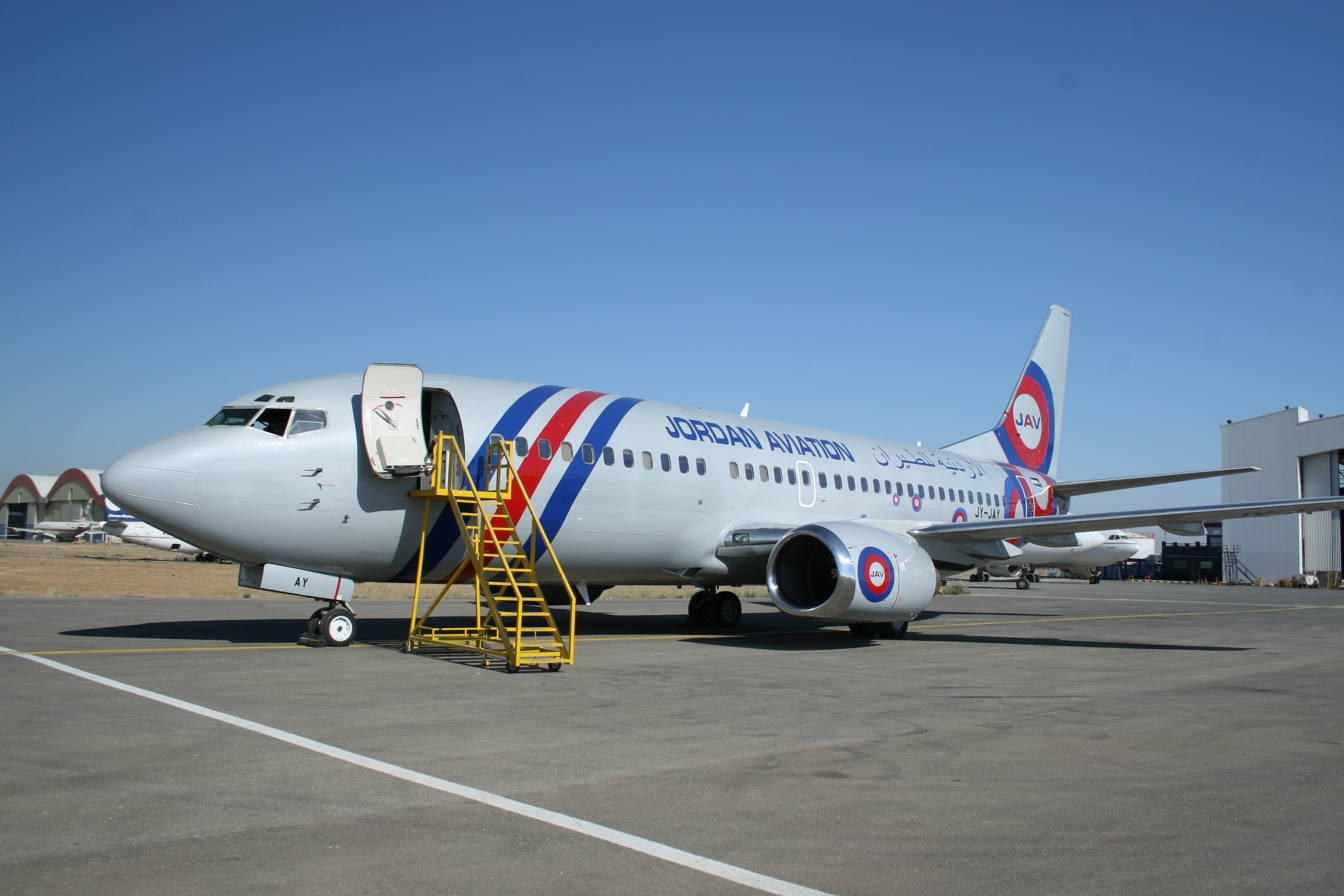
The new Jordan Aviation livery – JY-JAY June 2012

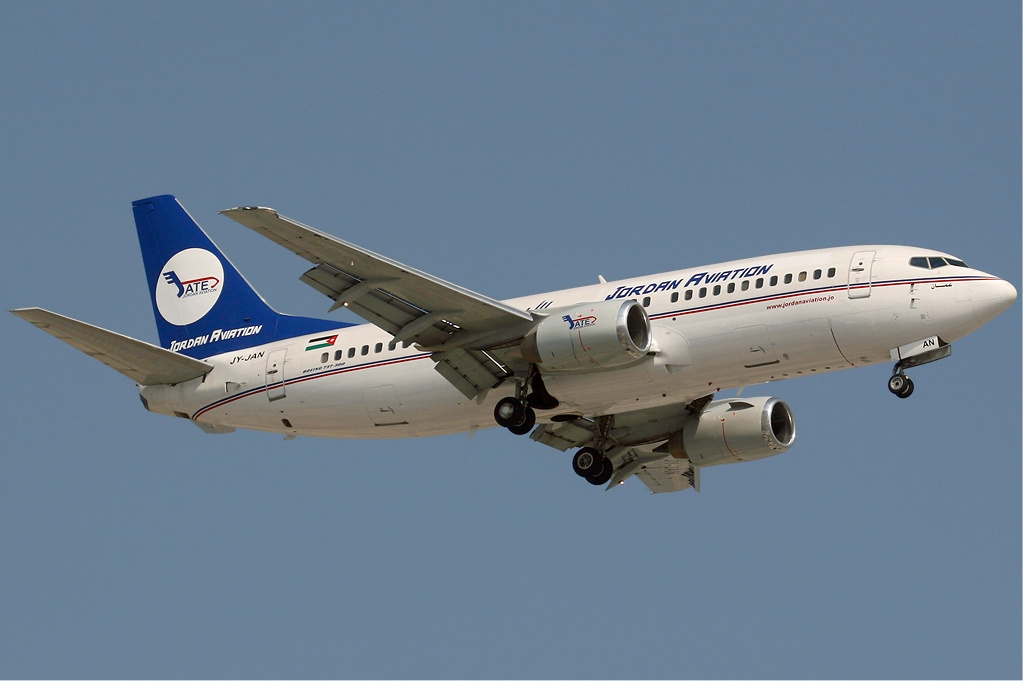
Jordan Aviation Boeing 737-300 wearing a former livery

As of July 2026, Jordan Aviation operates the following aircraft:

Jordan Aviation fleet
Aircraft	In Service	Orders	Passengers				Notes
Aircraft	In Service	Orders	F	C	Y	Total	Notes
Airbus A320	2	—	—	—	168	168	
Airbus A330-200	1	—	12	42	183	237	
Boeing 737-300	2	—	—	—	148	148	
Boeing 767-200ER	1	—	—	12	235	247	
Total	6	—					

=== Former fleet ===
As of August 2025, Jordan Aviation operated 2 Airbus A320, 2 Airbus A330-200, 2 Boeing 737-300 and 1 Boeing 767-200ER.

Jordan Aviation also previously operated the following aircraft:

- 1 Boeing 737-400
