= Airports Council International =

Trade association

Official logo of ACI

Airports Council International (ACI) is an organization of airport authorities, informing members of industry practices and airport standards. Established in 1991, its headquarters (ACI World) are based in Montreal, Quebec, Canada, and its members operate more than 2000 airports.

Major programs include safety enhancement and Airport Service Quality Awards (ASQ), based on passenger satisfaction ratings. Other initiatives cover economics, operational security, carbon accreditation, and passenger transportation.

== Background ==
Before 1970, the world's airports were represented by three distinct associations:

- Airport Operators Council International (AOCI)
- International Civil Airports Association (ICAA)
- Western European Airports Association (WEAA)

In 1970, these three associations created the Airport Associations Coordinating Council (AACC) in order to formulate unified airport industry policies, furthering collaboration between its constituent associations and representing them collectively with aviation organizations and other relevant bodies.

The decision to create ACI was taken in 1989. The Constitution of ACI to succeed AACC was approved in the autumn of 1990 and came into effect in 1991.

In 2011, ACI relocated its headquarters from Geneva, Switzerland, to Montreal, Canada. The decision was in part motivated by the fact that the International Civil Aviation Organization (ICAO) and the International Air Transport Association (IATA) are both also located in Montreal.

== Members ==
ACI reported 814 members operating 2,110 airports in 169 countries and territories. ACI regular members are owners or operators, other than airlines, of one or more civil airports with commercial air services.

== Priorities ==
ACI represents airports interests with governments and international organizations such as ICAO, develops standards, policies and recommended practices for airports, and provides information and training.

=== Safety ===
ACI considers safety its main priority and has launched programs such as Airport Excellence (APEX) to help airports enhance their level of safety. It also provides publications that describe recommendations and best practices for airport operators. It is involved in airport design specifications, standard operating procedures for airports, technology, systems & equipment, safety management systems for airports, safety guidance material and training.

=== Economics ===
ACI encourages its member airports to improve operational and cost efficiency to moderate the cost of flying, mitigate capacity shortfalls and create sufficient rates of return.

=== Security ===
ACI has formulated policy positions on security issues that guide the organization and member airports.

=== IT ===
All of the ACI IT initiatives are coordinated through the ACI World Airport IT Standing Committee, constituted by people from airports and business partners and aims to reformulate recommended practices and develop guidelines, benchmarking and training materials.

=== Environment ===
Airports Council International develops initiatives to reduce environmental impacts while supporting economic and social benefits. It created tools to help airports calculate their greenhouse gas emissions.

As one of the founding members of the Air Transport Action Group (ATAG), ACI, along with other trade associations, is part of a coalition of aviation industry experts focusing on sustainable development issues. ATAG defines common positions on issues to make contributions to the industry and governmental consultation processes.

=== Facilitation ===
ACI helps airports improve their management or flow of passengers, baggage, cargo and mail by providing a set of best practices together with measuring and benchmarking opportunities provided through the Airport Service Quality (ASQ) programs.

=== Airport Slots ===
In 2015, ACI created an Expert Group on Slots (EGS) that proposes a worldwide policy on slots. The Group wrote a Position Paper to guide ACI's advocacy on this topic and recommend involvement in the development of the IATA Worldwide Slot Guidelines.

== Programs ==
=== Airport Service Quality (ASQ) ===
ASQ is a worldwide program part of the ACI's Airport Quality Service Initiative that surveys passengers on their day of travel, measuring passengers' views. The program claims to "measure passengers' satisfaction" at the departure and arrival stages of their journey through airports.

=== Airport Excellence Program (APEX) ===
ACI first launched the Airports Excellence Program (APEX) in Safety in 2012. The program provides assistance for airports to enhance their level of safety. It is based on airport safety reviews, which analyze gaps in airport operation and infrastructure in comparison to International Civil Aviation Organization (ICAO) standards and safety best practices. ACI organizes and dispatches an on-site team from ICAO and other airports to identify and remedy safety vulnerabilities through peer reviews, information sharing, training, and assistance with implementations of management structures. It covers the setup, implementation, and performance of the safety management system in the areas of physical characteristics & pavement management, air rescue and firefighting, wildlife management, apron management, documentation, record keeping, and security management systems.

In October 2017, ACI launched the APEX in Security Program based on the same principles as APEX in Safety. The program covers Operational Security Management, with assessments being performed by security experts.

=== Airport Carbon Accreditation (ACA) ===
Airport Carbon Accreditation was launched as an independent, voluntary program in 2009 after the adoption of a resolution on climate change in 2008 at the annual assembly of ACI Europe. Member airports are committed to reduce carbon emissions from their operations, with the ultimate goal of becoming carbon neutral. The program allowed the assessment and recognition of participating airports' efforts to manage and reduce their CO_{2} emissions.

Airport Carbon Accreditation has been extended to airports in the Asia-Pacific region in 2011, in Africa in 2013, and eventually went global in 2014 with the extension to the regions of North America, Latin America and the Caribbean.

=== Next Experience in Travel and Technologies (NEXTT) ===
In 2017, IATA and ACI launched the New Experience in Travel and Technologies (NEXTT) initiative for on-ground transport experience, to guide industry investments and help governments improve the regulatory framework. NEXTT investigates how the passengers, cargo, baggage and aircraft move through the travel journey with a focus on change in off-airport activities, processing technology, and interactive decision-making.

=== Human and Wildlife Trafficking ===
Airports Council International expressed airports' commitment to the fight against human trafficking through the approbation of a resolution during the ACI World General Assembly in 2016. The resolution expressed ACI's commitments to promote awareness of human trafficking through media, provide access to training materials and materials for distribution, encourage the incorporation of training into airport staff security awareness programs, and support activities of governments, charities and non-governmental organizations who are involved in the prevention of human trafficking.

Airports Council International is committed to developing a framework to fight wildlife trafficking and adopting and encouraging the adoption of a zero-tolerance policy regarding illegal wildlife trade. ACI was one of the parties involved in the signature of the United for Wildlife Task Force Declaration at the Buckingham Palace in 2016. The organization is dedicated to developing practical solutions while cooperating with international initiatives such as the Reducing Opportunities for Unlawful Transport of Endangered Species (ROUTES) partnership.

== Regional offices ==
- ACI-North America: Washington, D.C. (with a Canadian Division satellite office in Ottawa)
- ACI-Europe: Brussels, Belgium
- ACI-Latin America and Caribbean: Panama City, Panama
- ACI Asia-Pacific: Hong Kong – encompassing mainland Asia, Australasia, Indonesian Archipelago, the island nations in the Pacific Ocean, Vancouver (Canada), San Francisco (USA) and Hawaii (USA).
- ACI-Africa: Casablanca, Morocco

== Statistics ==
ACI delivers data regarding the aviation industry monthly and annually.

- List of busiest airports by passenger traffic
- List of busiest airports by cargo traffic
- List of busiest airports by international passenger traffic

== Airport Service Quality Awards ==
The ACI gives out the Airport Service Quality Awards (ASQ), based on passenger satisfaction ratings in the ASQ Survey, which is a global survey based on interviews with passengers on the day of travel. Along with the World Airport Awards by Skytrax, it is considered one of the most prestigious accolades in the industry.

The awards are given out in five categories:

- Best Airport by Region
- Best Airport by Size
- Best Regional Airport
- Best Improvement

=== Best Airport Worldwide ===
Year	1st	Country	2nd	Country	3rd	Country
2006	Incheon International Airport	South Korea	Hong Kong International Airport	Hong Kong	Kuala Lumpur International Airport	Malaysia
2007	Incheon International Airport	South Korea	Kuala Lumpur International Airport	Malaysia	Changi Airport	Singapore
2008	Incheon International Airport	South Korea	Changi Airport	Singapore	Hong Kong International Airport	Hong Kong
2009	Incheon International Airport	South Korea	Changi Airport	Singapore	Hong Kong International Airport	Hong Kong
2010	Incheon International Airport	South Korea	Changi Airport	Singapore	Hong Kong International Airport	Hong Kong
2011	Incheon International Airport	South Korea	Changi Airport	Singapore	Beijing Capital International Airport	China
2012	Incheon International Airport	South Korea	Changi Airport	Singapore	Hong Kong International Airport	Hong Kong
2013	Changi Airport	Singapore	Incheon International Airport	South Korea	Amsterdam Airport Schiphol	Netherlands
2014	Changi Airport	Singapore	Incheon International Airport	South Korea	Munich Airport	Germany
2015	Changi Airport	Singapore	Incheon International Airport	South Korea	Munich Airport	Germany
2016	Changi Airport	Singapore	Incheon International Airport	South Korea	Munich Airport	Germany
2017	Changi Airport	Singapore	Haneda Airport	Japan	Incheon International Airport	South Korea
2018	Changi Airport	Singapore	Incheon International Airport	South Korea	Haneda Airport	Japan
2019	Changi Airport	Singapore	Haneda Airport	Japan	Incheon International Airport	South Korea
2020	Changi Airport	Singapore	Haneda Airport	Japan	Hamad International Airport	Qatar
2021	Hamad International Airport	Qatar	Haneda Airport	Japan	Changi Airport	Singapore
2022	Hamad International Airport	Qatar	Haneda Airport	Japan	Changi Airport	Singapore
2023	Changi Airport	Singapore	Hamad International Airport	Qatar	Haneda Airport	Japan
2024	Hamad International Airport	Qatar	Changi Airport	Singapore	Incheon International Airport	South Korea
2025	Singapore Changi	Singapore	Hamad International Airport	Qatar	Haneda Airport	Japan
