= GHG Protocol Corporate Standard =

Initiative for global standardisation of greenhouse gas reporting

Greenhouse Gas Protocol
- Formation: 1998
- CEO: Tim Mohin
- Website: https://ghgprotocol.org/

The Greenhouse Gas Protocol Corporate Standard (GHG Protocol Corporate Accounting and Reporting Standard) is an initiative for the global standardisation of emission of greenhouse gases in order that corporate entities should measure, quantify, and report their own emission levels, so that global emissions are made manageable. The relevant gases, described by the 11 December 1997 Kyoto Protocol, implemented 16 February 2005, are: carbon dioxide, hydrofluorocarbons, methane, nitrous oxide, nitrogen trifluoride, perfluorocarbons and sulphur hexafluoride.

The protocol itself is under the management of the World Resources Institute and the World Business Council for Sustainable Development.

The GHG Protocol has been criticised for not including in its guiding principals the need for emission reports to be comparable across companies. Nonetheless, it has become the de facto standard for corporate carbon footprinting thanks, in part, to organizers' persistent efforts to prevent competing standards from emerging. In 2025, GHG Protocol and International Organization for Standardization entered into a formal partnership to produce new, co-branded standards to replace analagous standards in both organisations.

== Organisation ==
The GHG Protocol was launched in 1998 and introduced in 2001.
