= Castellón Aerodrome =

Castellón Airport
- IATA: none; ICAO: LECN

Summary
- Serves: Castelló de la Plana
- Location: 5.5 km (3.4 mi) WNW of Castellón de la Plana
- Elevation AMSL: 20 ft / 6 m
- Coordinates: 39°59′56.4″N 0°1′33.6″E

Map
- Location in Spain

Runways
Direction	Length		Surface
Direction	m	ft	Surface
18/36	950	3,117	paved
- Runway and elevation information per tertiary source.

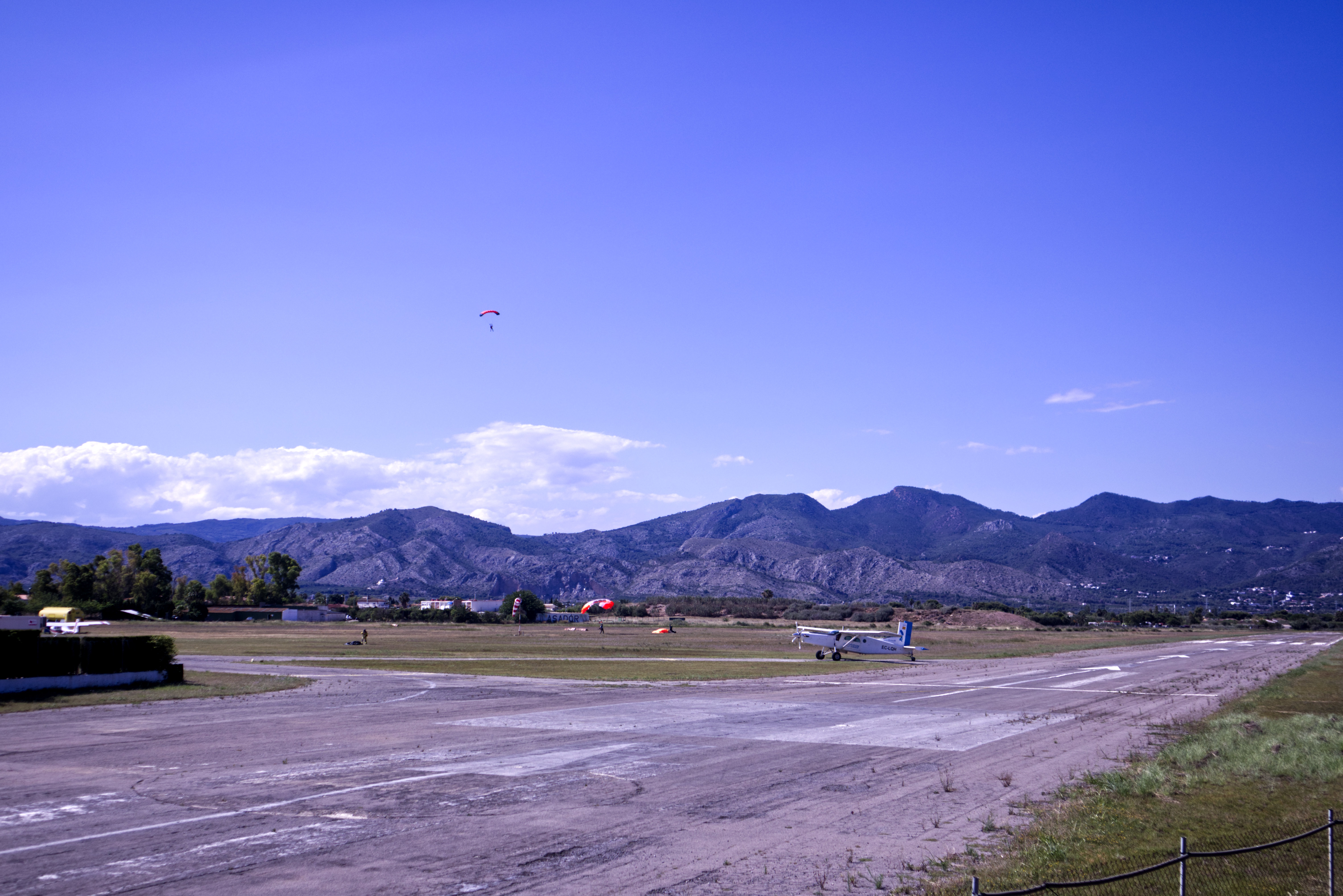

Castellón Airport (ICAO: LECN) is a small general aviation airport in Castelló de la Plana, on the mid-east coast of Spain, about 68 km (42 mi) north of Valencia.
