= Mahilyow Airport =

Airport in Belarus

Mahilyow International Airport Аэрапорт Магілёў (Belarusian)
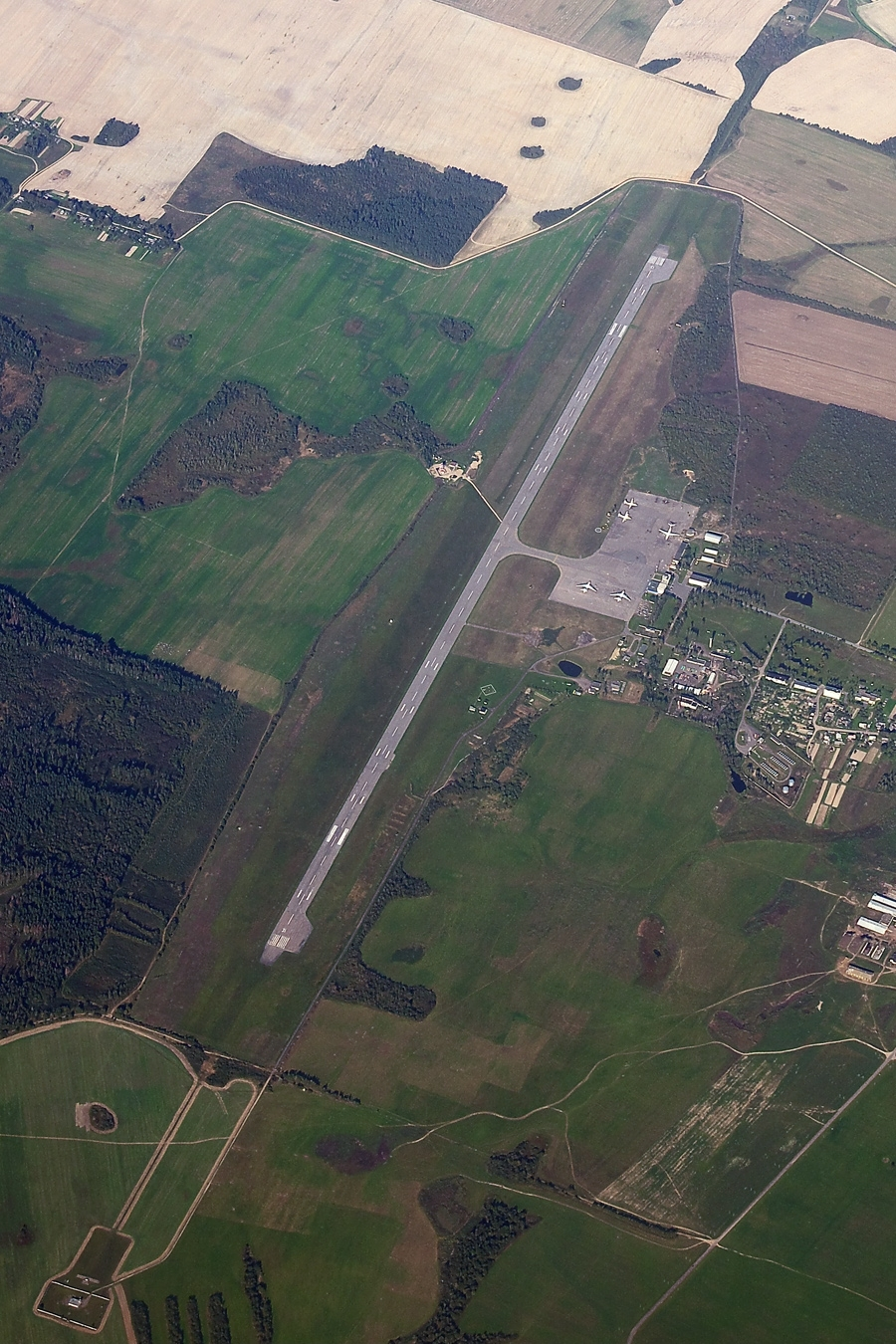
- Aerial view of the airport
- IATA: MVQ; ICAO: UMOO

Summary
- Airport type: Public
- Owner: Mahilyow Branch of the state enterprise Belaeronavigatsia
- Operator: Republican Unitary Enterprise Minsk National Airport
- Serves: Mahilyow
- Location: Lubnišča, Mahilyow district, Mahilyow region, Belarus
- Opened: 1946
- Focus city for: Belavia
- Time zone: EEST (UTC+03:00)
- Elevation AMSL: 637 ft (194 m)
- Coordinates: 53°57′18″N 030°05′42″E
- Website: Official website

Map
- Location of airport in Belarus

Runways
Direction	Length		Surface
Direction	ft	m	Surface
13/31	8,422	2,567	asphalt

Mahilyow (Mogilev) International Airport (Belarusian: Аэрапорт Магілёў, romanized: Aeraport Mahilioŭ; Russian: Аэропорт Могилёв, romanized: Aeroport Mogilyov) (IATA: MVQ, ICAO: UMOO) is an airport that serves Mahilyow, Belarus.

== History ==
The history of Mahilyow Airport dates back to 1946. Its original location was near the village of Lupolovo, close to Mogilev. The first passenger flights within the region began in 1961. Mogilev was connected by air to district centers and major cities of the Soviet Union.

In 1972, the history of Mahilyow Airport began at a new location, 17 km from Mahilyow, near the village of Lubnishche.

In the early 1990s, there was a significant decline in aviation activities due to the collapse of the USSR. In 1995, the state enterprise Mahilyow Airport (Mogilevavia) was established.

By Resolution No. 1010 of the Council of Ministers of the Republic of Belarus dated June 26, 1998, Mahilyow Airport was granted the status of an international airport.

In July 2000, Mahilyow Airport was reorganized into the Mahilyow Branch of the state enterprise Belaeronavigatsia.

In 2013, the runway and apron were reconstructed, and the number of parking stands for IL-76 aircraft was increased.

In 2015, charter flights were launched from Mahilyow for the first time, offering passengers the opportunity to fly to Burgas (Bulgaria). By 2019, the airport served several destinations, including Burgas (Bulgaria), Enfidha (Tunisia), Antalya (Turkey), and Sharm El Sheikh (Egypt). Charter programs operated until the end of 2021.

In 2023, the airport received the status of a branch of Minsk National Airport.

Mahilyow Airport has not been accepting regular flights since 2021-2025. In 2025, Belavia launched a regular flight from Mahilyow to Moscow and Antalya.

== Facilities ==
The airport provides border, customs, and sanitary-quarantine control services.

=== Runway ===
The airport has an asphalt-concrete runway 2,566 meters long and 42 meters wide, as well as a grass runway 2,000 meters long and 85 meters wide. It accommodates aircraft such as the Tu-154, Il-76, and lower-class models, with a maximum takeoff weight of up to 191 tons.

== Airlines and destinations ==
Airlines	Destinations
Belavia	Moscow–Vnukovo; Seasonal charter: Antalya, Sharm El Sheikh

== Statistics ==
Passenger numbers
Year	Passengers
2018	6,485
