= Vitebsk Vostochny Airport =

- IATA: VTB; ICAO: UMII

Summary
- Airport type: Public
- Serves: Vitebsk, Belarus
- Elevation AMSL: 208 m / 682 ft
- Coordinates: 55°7′36″N 030°21′6″E

Map

Runways
Direction	Length		Surface
Direction	m	ft	Surface
06/24	2,606	8,550	Concrete

Vitebsk Vostochny Airport (Belarusian: Аэрапорт Віцебск (Усходні), Russian: Аэропорт Витебск Восточный) (also known as Vitebsk Southeast Airport) (IATA: VTB, ICAO: UMII) is an airport serving Vitebsk city in northern Belarus. It is located 12 kilometres (7.5 mi) southeast of the city.

== Airlines and destinations ==
Airlines	Destinations
Belavia	Seasonal charter: Antalya, Sharm El Sheikh
