= Airports Council International Europe =

Trade association

Airports Council International Europe (ACI EUROPE) is a European industry trade association which advances the collective interests of Europe's airports and promotes professional excellence in airport management and operations. The members are over 600 airport operators of all sizes in 58 European countries, over 90% of commercial air traffic in Europe. ACI EUROPE member airports welcomed over 2.3 billion passengers and handled 17 million metric tonnes of cargo and nearly 45 million aircraft movements each year since 1990.

ACI EUROPE is a non-profit organisation. It is led by their non executive-general Olivier Jankovec, and has a team of 25 full-time staff. Its offices are in the Square de Meeûs, Brussels, Belgium. As one of the regional bodies within the global family that constitutes Airports Council International, ACI EUROPE is in regular contact with its sister organisations, including Airports Council International, ACI NORTH AMERICA, ACI ASIA-PACIFIC, ACI LATIN-AMERICA & CARIBBEAN, and ACI AFRICA.

== History ==
ACI EUROPE was formed in 1990, as part of a wider development which saw the creation of Airports Council International. European Airports had previously been represented by the Western European Airports Association (WEAA), which was integrated with two other international airport representative bodies – Airports Operators Council International (AOCI) and International Civil Airports Association (ICAA) into the Airports Association Coordinating Council (AACC) in 1970. WEAA disbanded fully in 1985, while AOCI and ICAA remained in existence within the AACC until the Constitution of the new ACI was approved in the autumn on 1990 and came fully into effect on January 1, 1991.

== Policy areas ==
Much of the ACI EUROPE membership is located within the European Union, which has a highly active regulatory environment concerning the aviation industry, relative to other regions of the globe. As a result, many of ACI EUROPE's policy concerns reflect those of the various decision making institutions of the European Union, alongside the concerns of the wider aviation industry.

=== Committees ===
Individual issues vary according to political and industry developments, however ACI EUROPE has six committees which address broad policy areas:

- Facilitation & Customer Services Committee – focused upon airports' efforts to improve the passenger experience
- Aviation Security Committee – focused upon all issues concerning aviation security
- Environmental Strategy Committee – focused upon environmental issues, in particular carbon emissions, noise control, local air quality and intermodality
- Technical and Operational Safety Committee – focused on issues such as safety, airport capacity, Single European Sky, airside operations, and slot regulation
- Economics Committee – focused on issues such as airport charges, key performance indicators, and competition issues
- Policy Committee – focused upon broader strategic issues affecting airports, encompassing some of the issues addressed in other committees.

In addition ACI EUROPE has two fora – The Commercial Forum and the Regional Airports’ Forum. These fora address commercial concerns and the interests of smaller regional airports respectively.

==== The Connectivity Challenge ====
The Policy Outlook states that the aviation industry remains constrained by antiquated rules restricting market access and airline investment. The document supports the liberalisation of the European aviation market, and notes that the number of air routes has increased by 170% since the creation of the single aviation market in 1993. This has facilitated the integration of new accession states into the EU. However remaining government-to-government restrictions on air routes, capacity, pricing and airline ownership and control need to be lifted beyond the EU. In particular regional airports and the communities they support would benefit greatly from the resulting increased opportunities for global connectivity. As well as additional routes, freer competition would allow the more efficient use of scarce slots and reduce dependency upon single carriers. Therefore, restrictive bilateral air service agreements and inadequate slot allocation policies should be abolished. ACI EUROPE supports the European Commission's efforts to fully liberalise international air services agreements at an EU level and in its Policy Outlook suggests that priority should be given to:

1. Full liberalisation with the United States of America and [Canada]
2. Achieving a pan-European and pan-Mediterranean aviation area comprising all EU neighbouring countries by 2013.
3. Initiating negotiations with the EU's main trading partners – Brazil, Russia, India, China and Japan - at the earliest opportunity

ACI EUROPE states that European airports are willing to participate directly in international aviation negotiations.

== Initiatives ==
In addition to the actions of its committees, ACI EUROPE is involved in several specific initiatives which seek to further its policy interests.

=== Airport Carbon Accreditation ===
Airport Carbon Accreditation is the European carbon standard for airports.

=== Airport Collaborative Decision Making ===
Airport Collaborative Decision Making(A-CDM) is a joint venture between ACI EUROPE, EUROCONTROL and the Civil Air Navigation Services Organisation which aims to improve the operational efficiency of all airport operators.

=== Single European Sky ===
ACI EUROPE is fully supportive of the Single European Sky project, and participates fully as the representative of European airports.

== Publications ==
=== Airport Business ===
Communiqué AIRPORT BUSINESS magazine is ACI EUROPE's quarterly magazine, containing policy and commercial news regarding airports primarily based in Europe.

=== Traffic Report ===
Traffic reports are published on a monthly basis, outlining the performance of the European aviation industry, from an aggregate level and to an individual airport level.

=== Special Editions ===
ACI EUROPE also produces special editions of Airport Business for major airports in Europe. Special editions typically provide an overview of specific airports, consisting of interviews with senior members of staff on relevant topics.

== Membership and governance ==
=== Membership types ===
There are four different types of memberships available.

- Regular Members: airports in geographical Europe with regular or permanent commercial air traffic (affiliated regular membership of ACI EUROPE is open to airports which are already regular members of another region of ACI).
- World Business Partners: commercial enterprises seeking airport-related business.
- National Airport Associations: trade associations for airport operators, operating at national level in European countries
- Educational Establishments: third level institutions with a relevant specialism in aviation and air transport-related studies.

Presently ACI EUROPE has:

- 187 regular members operating 427 airports
- 1 affiliated regular member
- 6 national airport associations
- 14 educational establishments
- 152 World Business Partners
- 4 affiliated World Business Partners
