= Sharm El Sheikh International Airport =

Airport in Egypt

Sharm El Sheikh International Airport مطار شرم الشيخ الدولي
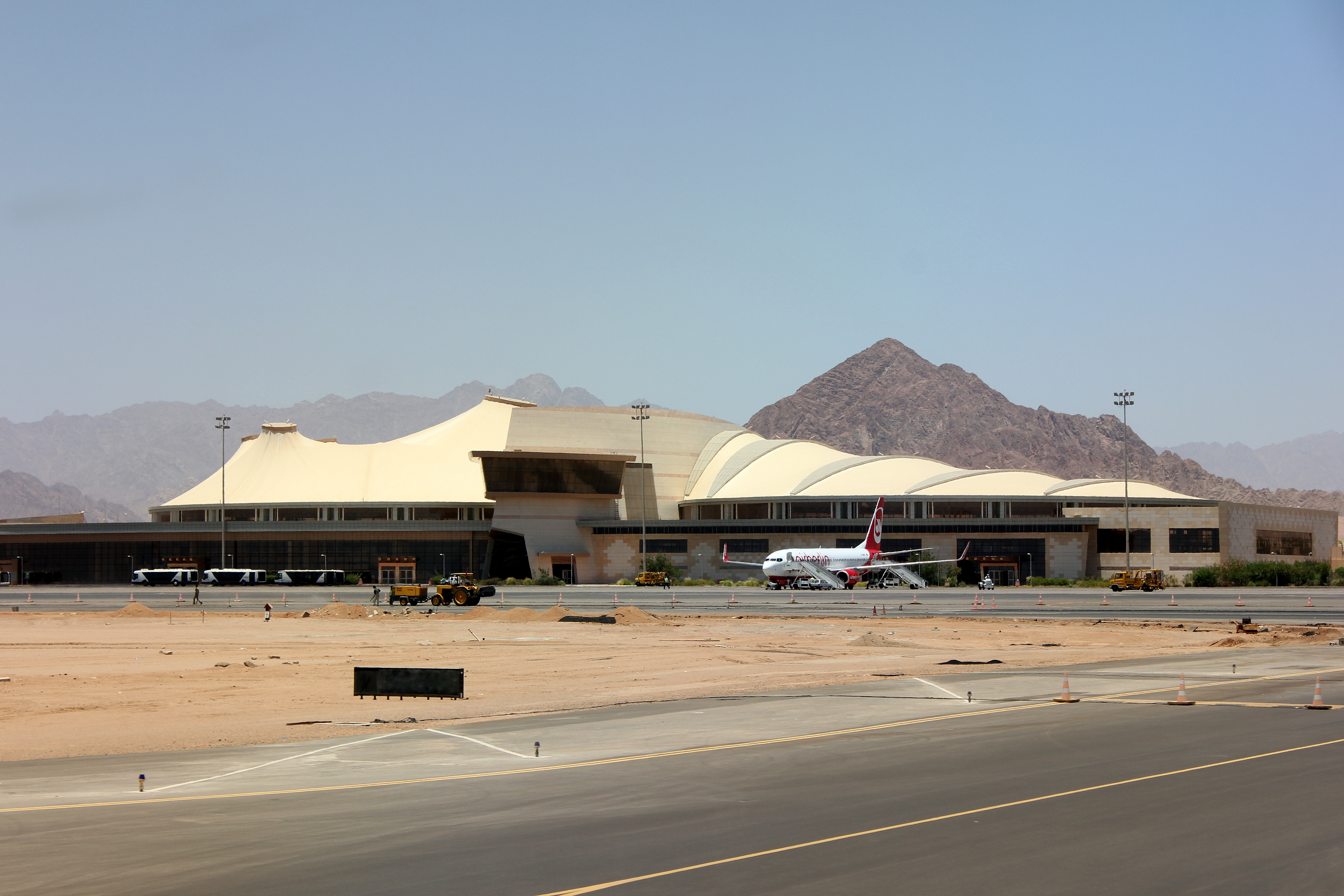
- IATA: SSH; ICAO: HESH

Summary
- Airport type: Public (former military)
- Operator: Egyptian Government
- Serves: Sharm El Sheikh, Egypt
- Focus city for: Air Cairo; AlMasria Universal Airlines; Sky Vision Airlines
- Elevation AMSL: 143 ft (44 m)
- Coordinates: 27°58′38″N 34°23′41″E
- Website: sharmelsheikh-airport.com/en

Map
- Location of airport in Sinai SSH (Egypt) SSH (Asia)

Runways
Direction	Length		Surface
Direction	m	ft	Surface
04L/22R	3,081	10,108	Asphalt
04R/22L	3,081	10,108	Asphalt

Statistics (2024)
- Passengers: 6,837,007
- Source: DAFIF

Sharm El Sheikh International Airport (Arabic: مطار شرم الشيخ الدولي Maṭār Sharm El Sheikh El Dawli) (IATA: SSH, ICAO: HESH) is an international airport located in Sharm El Sheikh, Egypt. It is the third-busiest airport in Egypt after Cairo International Airport and Hurghada International Airport and one of the busiest airports in the Middle East. Sharm el-Sheikh International Airport has two main passenger terminals, with the larger terminal, handling most international flights, and the other terminal, which is primarily used for domestic flights.

== Overview ==
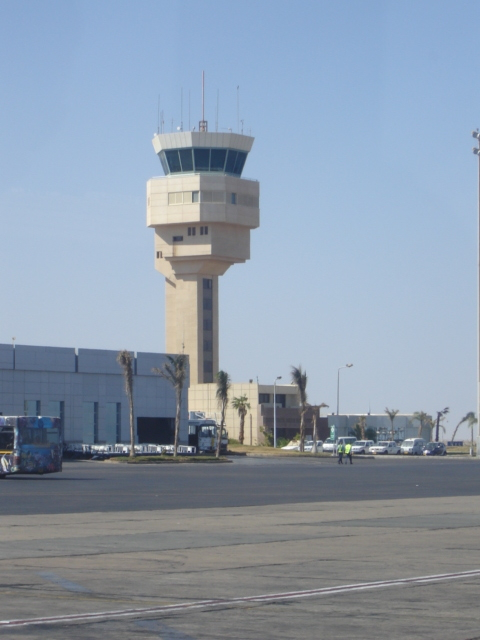
Control tower at Sharm El Sheikh International Airport

The airport was opened on 14 May 1968 as an Israeli Air Force base. After the signing of the Egypt–Israel peace treaty in 1979 and subsequent Israeli withdrawal from the Sinai Peninsula, it was reopened as a civilian airport.

The largest regular aircraft using the airport was a Transaero Airlines-operated Boeing 747-400. These flights transiting from Moscow ended when Transaero ceased operations in October 2015. As of December 2022, Red Wings Airlines operates the current largest regular aircraft, a Boeing 777-200ER, transiting from Moscow Domodedovo Airport.

In 2008, the Egyptian Airports Holding Company (EAHC) announced plans to build a third new terminal at the airport. In July 2009 the Egyptian Holding Company for Airports and Air Navigation (EHCAAN) signed a contract with Spanish construction designers Pointec for the third terminal. The terminal was planned to double the airport's capacity from 7.5 to 15 million passengers per year. The project's primary costs were estimated at $420 million. The design phase was due to be completed by early 2010. International contractors then were invited for an open tender to construct the terminal, which was scheduled to be completely constructed by 2015. By September 2016 construction had not commenced. The airport would be expected to cater to 18 million passengers annually by 2025.

On October 31, 2015, Metrojet Flight 9268, en route from Sharm El Sheikh to St. Petersburg, Russia, crashed in the Sinai Peninsula between Nekhel and Housna, killing all 224 people on board, most of them Russian tourists. The jihadist group ISIL, at war with Russian forces in nearby Syria, quickly claimed responsibility for the crash, which was believed by Western governments to be the result of a terrorist bombing. Russian investigators confirmed in mid-November that the flight was bombed. Following these events, many countries ordered all flights to Sharm El Sheikh suspended until further notice.

In November 2015, passenger numbers significantly decreased due to the downing of Metrojet Flight 9268 on 31 October 2015. This led to airlines cancelling flights from the airport and operating rescue flights for stranded passengers. Governments from Russia and European countries such as the United Kingdom banned airlines from operating to the airport, citing safety concerns that were highlighted following the crash. The Government of the United Kingdom, HM Government advised against all travel to and from Sharm El Sheikh.

In January 2018, it was announced that EgyptAir Express would open a base at the airport for its incoming fleet of Airbus A220s. This would increase the amount of destinations served by the airline at the airport with the possibility of operating to cities in Italy, Germany, Morocco and India non-stop.

On 22 October 2019, following a comprehensive overhaul of security procedures, the UK lifted the flight ban on flights between UK airports and Sharm El Sheikh.

On 1 November 2019 TUI AG, parent company of TUI Airways and TUI UK announced a resumption of flights to the airport, starting in February 2020.

On 9 August 2021, Rossiya Airlines operated the first flight between Russia and Sharm El Sheikh for the first time in 5 years since the banning of the flights between the resort and Russia, due to the downing of Metrojet Flight 9268.

== Terminals ==
=== Terminal 1 ===
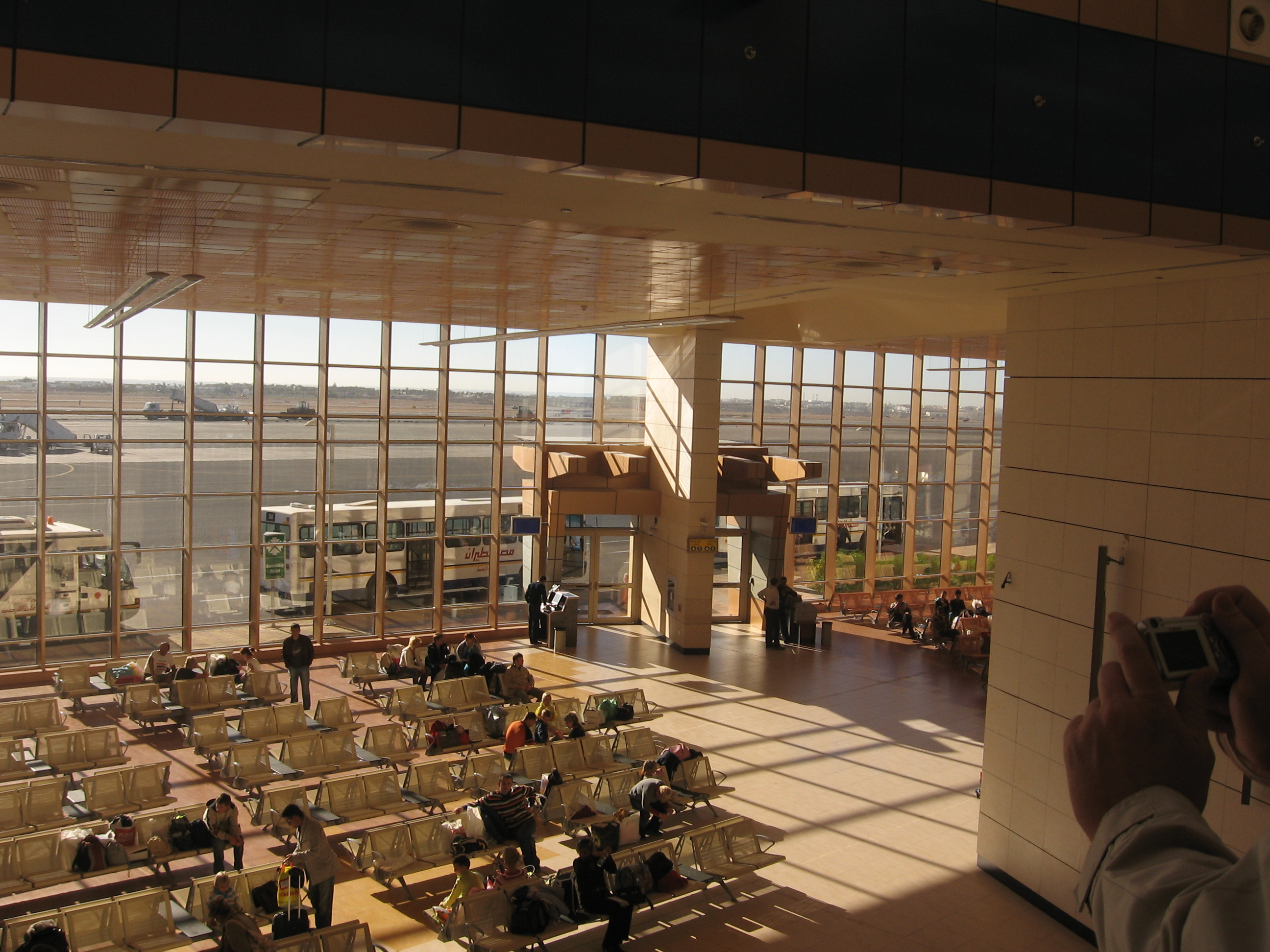
Terminal 1 Departure hall at Sharm El Sheikh International Airport

On 23 May 2007, the airport's second terminal, the new Terminal 1, was inaugurated with a capacity for 5 million passengers per year. The two-level, 43,000-square-metre (460,000 sq ft) terminal features 40 check-in counters and is designed to cater to a large number of international and chartered flights. It has two domestic and six international gates, all of which exit to remote stands. The terminal comprises three building components: two circular-shaped halls fused together by a wedge-shaped intermediate space dubbed 'the boat'. This serves as a passenger transit hub housing passport control, duty-free, and VIP areas as well as cafes/restaurants. The halls, in stark textural contrast to the solid mass of 'the boat', feature airy, billowing tent-like roofs inspired by the indigenous Bedouin culture.

=== Terminal 2 ===
Although known as Terminal 2, this is actually the airport's original terminal building. The building underwent a complete modernisation programme in 2004 and has a passenger handling capacity of 2.5 million passengers per year. Since the inauguration of Terminal 1 in 2007 most airlines have shifted operations to the new building.

In December 2016, Egyptian Airports Company announced plans to extend Terminal 2. EAC plans to expand the terminal and increase its capacity by two million passengers per year, thus taking the total capacity of the airport to 9.5 million. This also includes the construction of a new runway and 40 new airsides.

In November 2019, it was announced part of the expansion of Terminal 2 had been completed increasing the airports annual capacity, from 7 million, to 9 million a year. The plan aims to increase the capacity to 20 million passengers per annum as the number of tourists visiting the resort city is rising, during winter in particular. For now, the number of gates was raised to 12 from 8. The total cost of development works in the airport has reached LE 800 million so far.

=== Terminal 3 ===
Terminal 3 was proposed in 2008 to increase the airport's passenger handling capacity by 10 million. The airport would be expected to cater to 18 million passengers annually by 2025. The new terminal and runway were planned to be constructed adjacent to the el Salam road. Terminal three and its contact stands would occupy an area of about 183,000m² featuring a departure hall and an arrival hall, serving both international and domestic passengers. The terminal three was to face a new airfield to the north of the existing airport. Its origami shaped roof folds provide shades over the departure area, protect the facades from direct sunlight and provide natural lighting throughout the building. Taxiways and aprons were also to be constructed as part of the project. Other associated infrastructure were to include an electrical or mechanical plant, sheds for security services, a mosque, a car parking area and a wastewater treatment facility. The wastewater from the new building was to be connected to the existing sewer system and would be treated before being conveyed for the purpose of irrigation.

== Airlines and destinations ==
The following airlines operate regular scheduled and charter flights at Sharm El Sheikh Airport:

Airlines	Destinations
Aegean Airlines	Seasonal: Athens
Aeroflot	Krasnodar, Moscow–Sheremetyevo, Saint Petersburg, Sochi
Air Astana	Almaty (begins 10 December 2026), Astana (begins 11 December 2026)
Air Algerie	Seasonal charter: Algiers, Constantine, Oran
Air Cairo	Almaty, Astana, Atyrau Baku, Bari, Bergamo, Berlin, Bologna, Cairo, Düsseldorf, Frankfurt, Hurghada, Istanbul, Luxor, Milan–Malpensa, Moscow–Sheremetyevo, Munich, Naples, Rome–Fiumicino, Saint Petersburg, Tashkent, Venice, Yerevan; Seasonal: Alexandria, Amman–Queen Alia, Aktobe, Casablanca, Catania, Jeddah, Kostanay, Riyadh; Seasonal charter: Aarhus, Beirut, Copenhagen, Kaliningrad, Kazan, Madrid, Orenburg, Perm, Sochi, Ufa, Volgograd
Air Samarkand	Seasonal charter: Tashkent
Air Serbia	Seasonal charter: Belgrade
airBaltic	Seasonal: Riga
AJet	Istanbul–Sabiha Gökçen
Alexandria Airlines	Seasonal charter: Casablanca, Jeddah, Marrakesh, Moscow–Domodedovo, Tangier
AlMasria Universal Airlines	Cairo; Seasonal charter: Chelyabinsk, Kaliningad, Kazan, Krasnodar, Moscow–Sheremetyevo, Nizhny Novgorod, Orenburg, Perm, Saint Petersburg, Samara, Sochi, Tyumen, Ufa
Atlantic Airways	Seasonal charter: Copenhagen
Azerbaijan Airlines	Baku
Azimuth	Mineralnye Vody, Sochi
Azur Air	Seasonal charter: Chelyabinsk, Kazan, Mineralnye Vody, Moscow–Vnukovo, Nizhny Novgorod, Perm, Saint Petersburg, Samara, Sochi, Tyumen, Ufa
Belavia	Seasonal charter: Brest, Homiel, Mahilyow, Minsk, Vitsyebsk
BH Air	Seasonal charter: Sofia
British Airways	Seasonal: London–Gatwick
DAT	Seasonal charter: Copenhagen
easyJet	Belfast–International, Birmingham, Bristol, Edinburgh (begins 10 November 2026), Glasgow, Liverpool, London–Gatwick, London–Luton, Manchester, Milan–Malpensa, Naples, Newcastle upon Tyne; Seasonal: Amsterdam, Berlin, Geneva, London-Southend (begins 4 January 2027), Paris–Charles de Gaulle
Edelweiss Air	Zurich
Egyptair	Cairo, Hurghada, Luxor; Seasonal: Alexandria, Moscow–Domodedovo
Enter Air	Seasonal charter: Katowice, Warsaw–Chopin
Fly Lili	Seasonal charter: Bucharest–Băneasa
Flyadeal	Seasonal: Jeddah, Riyadh
FlyArystan	Seasonal charter: Aktau, Aktobe, Atyrau, Oral
Flynas	Jeddah, Riyadh
FlyOne	Seasonal charter: Chișinău
GetJet Airlines	Seasonal charter: Riga, Tallinn, Vilnius
Gulf Air	Seasonal: Bahrain
Iraqi Airways	Seasonal charter: Baghdad
ITA Airways	Seasonal charter: Rome–Fiumicino
Jazeera Airways	Seasonal: Kuwait City
Jet2.com	Birmingham (begins 12 February 2027), East Midlands (begins 12 February 2027), Edinburgh (begins 16 February 2027), Leeds/Bradford (begins 13 February 2027), London–Gatwick (begins 11 February 2027), London–Stansted (begins 11 February 2027), Manchester (begins 13 February 2027)
Jordan Aviation	Seasonal: Amman–Queen Alia
Kuwait Airways	Seasonal: Kuwait City
Middle East Airlines	Seasonal charter: Beirut
Neos	Bologna, Milan–Malpensa, Rome–Fiumicino, Verona; Seasonal: Bari, Bergamo, Catania, Naples, Pescara, Rimini
Nesma Airlines	Seasonal charter: Krasnodar
Nile Air	Cairo; Seasonal: Tashkent
Norwegian Air Shuttle	Seasonal: Stockholm–Arlanda
Pegasus Airlines	Istanbul–Sabiha Gökçen; Seasonal: Antalya
Petroleum Air Services	Seasonal charter: Beirut, Cairo
Red Sea Airlines	Seasonal charter: Almaty, Astana, Bishkek, Moscow–Sheremetyevo, Moscow-Vnukovo, Yekaterinburg, Yerevan
Red Wings Airlines	Seasonal charter: Kazan, Moscow–Domodedovo, Makhachkala, Moscow–Zhukovsky, Saint Petersburg, Saransk, Sochi
Rossiya Airlines	Seasonal charter: Chelyabinsk, Kazan, Nizhny Novogorod, Moscow–Sheremetyevo, Perm, Saint Petersburg, Samara, Sochi, Ufa, Yekaterinburg
Royal Jordanian	Seasonal: Amman–City, Amman–Queen Alia
Saudia	Jeddah, Riyadh
SCAT Airlines	Seasonal charter: Petropavl
Sky Vision Airlines	Seasonal charter: Kazan, Moscow-Sheremetyevo, Omsk, Perm, Saint Petersburg, Tyumen, Ufa, Yekaterinburg
Skyline Express	Seasonal charter: Warsaw–Radom
SkyUp Airlines	Charter: Prague
Smartwings	Seasonal charter: Prague
Sunday Airlines	Seasonal charter: Aktobe, Almaty, Astana, Kostanay, Oral, Shymkent
SunExpress	Antalya, İzmir
Transavia	Seasonal: Amsterdam
TUI Airways	Birmingham, Bristol, East Midlands, Glasgow, London–Gatwick, London–Stansted, Manchester, Newcastle upon Tyne
TUI fly Belgium	Brussels
TUI fly Netherlands	Seasonal: Eindhoven
Turkish Airlines	Istanbul
Ural Airlines	Seasonal charter: Kazan, Moscow–Domodedovo, Nizhny Novgorod, Perm, Sochi Vladikavkaz,
Utair	Moscow-Vnukovo, Tyumen
Uzbekistan Airways	Seasonal: Tashkent
Vueling	Seasonal: Barcelona
Wizz Air	Budapest, Gdańsk, Katowice, Milan–Malpensa, Naples, Palermo, Rome–Fiumicino, Turin, Warsaw–Modlin; Seasonal: Catania, London–Gatwick, London–Luton, Venice

== Accidents and incidents ==
- On January 3, 2004, Flash Airlines Flight 604, en route to Cairo and then Paris as its final destination, crashed in the Red Sea shortly after taking off from Sharm El Sheikh, killing all 148 people on board. Causes for the accident include pilot error and instrument failure, but investigators have been unable to reach a consensus.
- On August 23, 2015, Thomson Airways Flight 476, approaching Sharm El Sheikh at the end of a flight from London Stansted Airport with 189 passengers aboard, took evasive action to avoid a missile traveling toward it; the missile missed the airliner by about 1,000 feet (300 meters), and the plane landed safely. An investigation concluded that the missile was an Egyptian armed forces missile that had strayed from a military exercise.
- On October 31, 2015 Metrojet Flight 9268, en route to Pulkovo Airport in Saint Petersburg was destroyed by a bomb planted onboard by Islamic State's Sinai Peninsula Branch shortly after take off from Sharm El Sheikh killing all 224 people on board.

== See also ==
- List of airports in Egypt
- List of the busiest airports in the Middle East
