= Torreón Airport =

- IATA: none; ICAO: SCKT

Summary
- Airport type: Private
- Serves: Coelemu, Chile
- Elevation AMSL: 216 ft / 66 m
- Coordinates: 36°30′00″S 72°40′44″W

Map
- Location of Torreón Airport in Chile

Runways
| Direction | Length | | Surface |
| Direction | m | ft | Surface |
|---|---|---|---|
| 13/31 | 740 | 2,428 | Gravel |
- Source: Landings.com Google Maps GCM

For the airport in Mexico see Francisco Sarabia International Airport

Torreón Airport Spanish: Aeropuerto Torreón, (ICAO: SCKT) is an airstrip 2 kilometres (1 mi) southeast of Coelemu, a town in the Bío Bío Region of Chile.

The airstrip lies between the Itata River and the highway running alongside it. The runway has an additional 160 metres (520 ft) of unpaved overrun on the northwest end. There are low hills in all quadrants.

The Concepcion VOR-DME (Ident: CAR) is located 23.7 nautical miles (43.9 km) southwest of the airstrip.

== See also ==
- Transport in Chile
- List of airports in Chile
