= Le Versoud =

- Commune
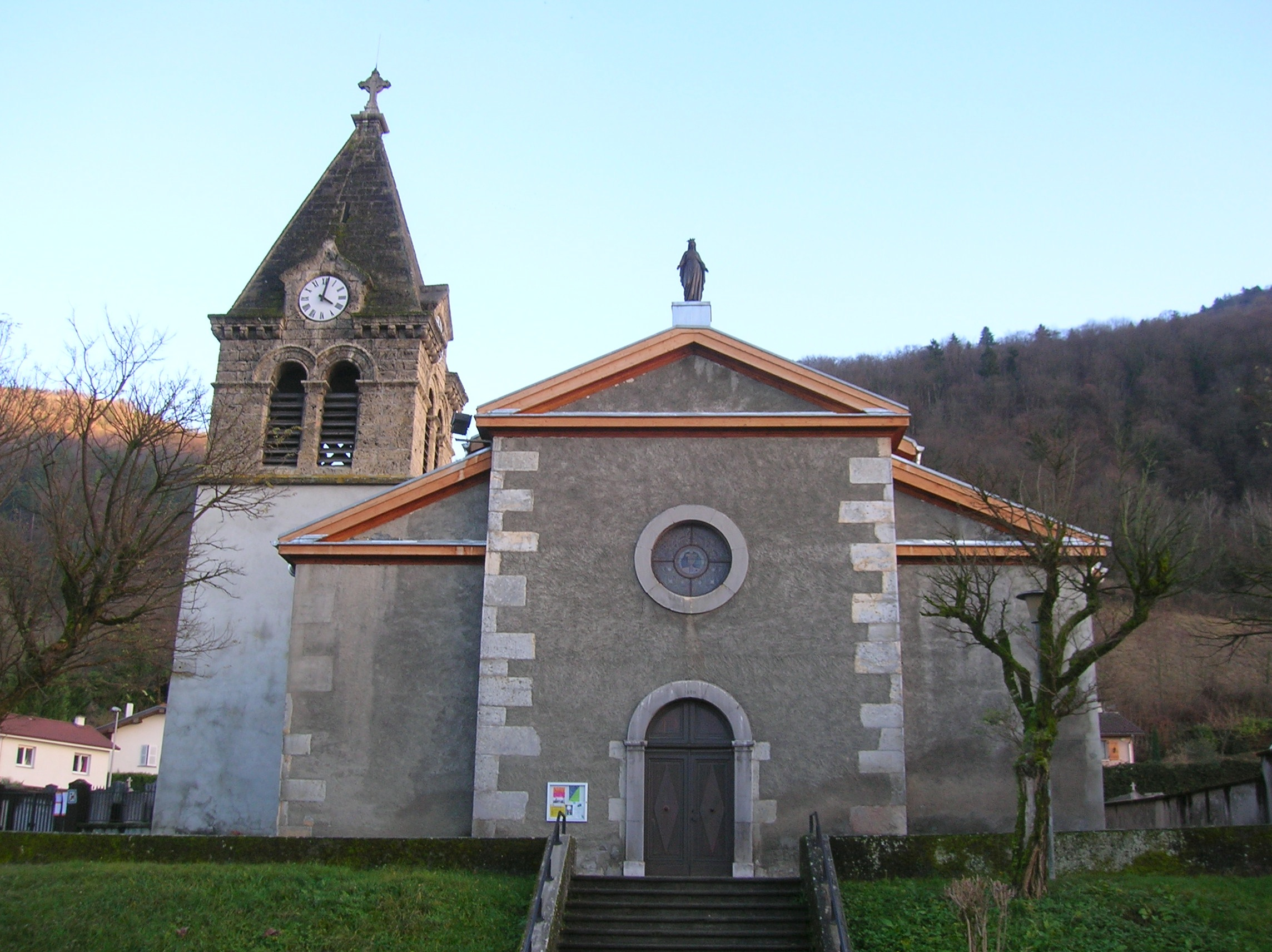
- The church of Le Versoud
- Location of Le Versoud
- Location within France Location within Auvergne-Rhône-Alpes
- Coordinates: 45°13′01″N 5°51′46″E
- Country: France
- Region: Auvergne-Rhône-Alpes
- Department: Isère
- Arrondissement: Grenoble
- Canton: Le Moyen Grésivaudan
- Intercommunality: CC Le Grésivaudan

Government
  - Mayor (2020–2026): Christophe Suszylo
- Area^{1}: 6 km^{2} (2.3 sq mi)
- Elevation: 222 m (728 ft)
- Highest elevation: 441 m (1,447 ft)
- Lowest elevation: 216 m (709 ft)
- Population (2023): 4,900
  - Density: 820/km^{2} (2,100/sq mi)
- Time zone: UTC+01:00 (CET)
  - Summer (DST): UTC+02:00 (CEST)
- INSEE/Postal code: 38538 /38420
- ^{1} French Land Register data, which excludes lakes, ponds, glaciers > 1 km^{2} (0.386 sq mi or 247 acres) and river estuaries.

Le Versoud (French pronunciation: [lə vɛʁsu]) is a commune in the Isère department in the Auvergne-Rhône-Alpes region in southeastern France. It is part of the Grenoble urban unit (agglomeration).

== Population ==
Historical population

Year	Pop.	±% p.a.
1793	603	—
1821	481	−0.80%
1846	534	+0.42%
1872	500	−0.25%
1901	412	−0.67%
1926	1,272	+4.61%
1946	1,029	−1.05%
1962	1,445	+2.14%
1968	1,675	+2.49%

Year	Pop.	±% p.a.
1975	1,772	+0.81%
1982	2,217	+3.25%
1990	2,995	+3.83%
1999	3,809	+2.71%
2007	4,365	+1.72%
2012	4,637	+1.22%
2017	4,818	+0.77%
2023	4,900	+0.28%

Source: EHESS and INSEE (1968-2023)

== See also ==
- Grenoble - Le Versoud Aerodrome
