= Grenoble – Le Versoud Aerodrome =

Coordinates: 45°13′05″N 005°50′55″E

Grenoble - Le Versoud Aerodrome Aérodrome de Grenoble - Le Versoud
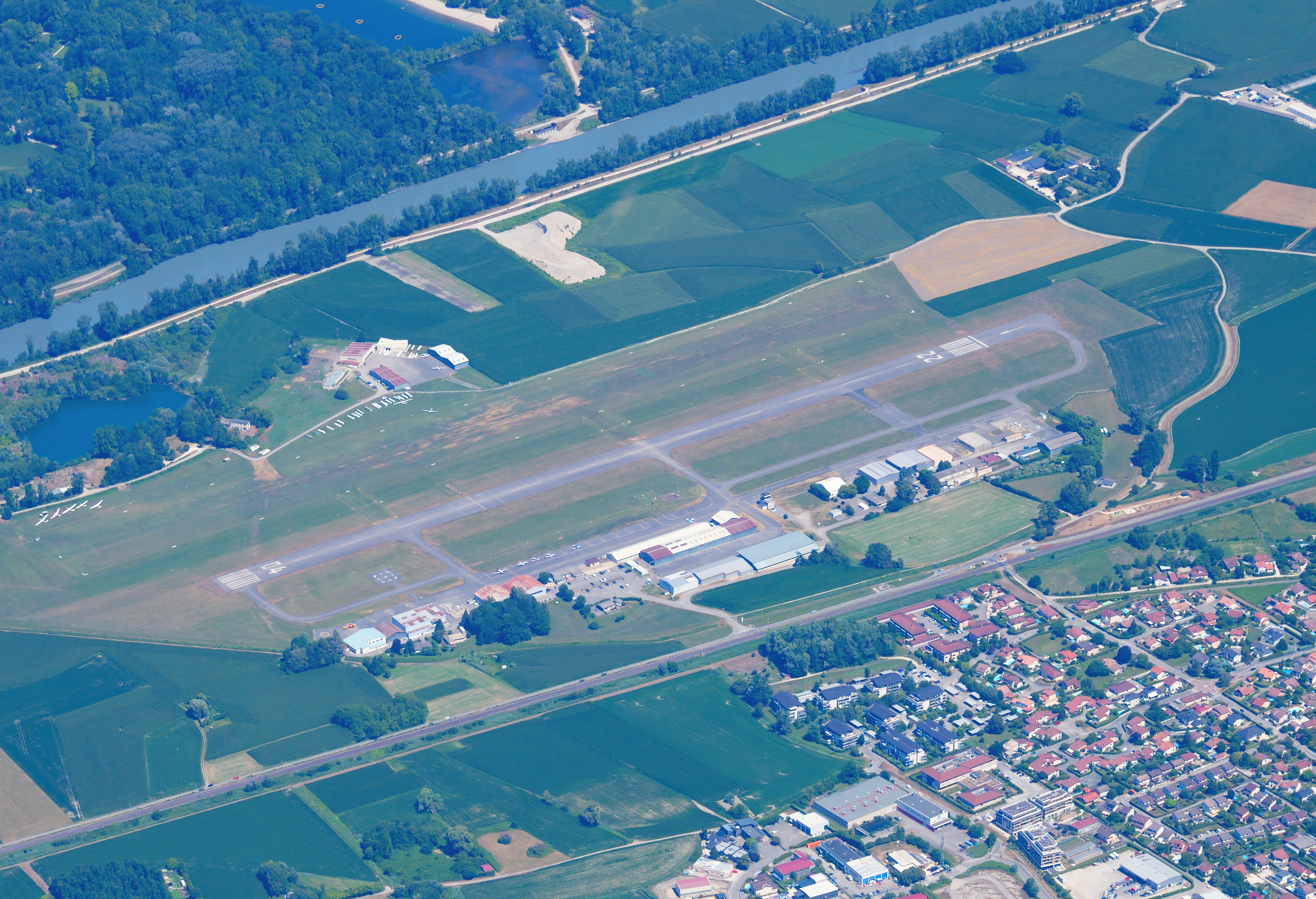
- IATA: none; ICAO: LFLG

Summary
- Airport type: Public
- Serves: Grenoble, France
- Elevation AMSL: 724 ft (221 m)
- Interactive map of Grenoble - Le Versoud Aerodrome

Runways
Direction	Length		Surface
Direction	m	ft	Surface
04/22	900	2,952	Asphalt

Statistics (2011)
- Aircraft movements: 72,493
- Source: French AIP

Grenoble – Le Versoud Aerodrome (French: Aérodrome de Grenoble - Le Versoud) (ICAO: LFLG) is an airport located 10 km northeast of Grenoble, in Le Versoud, a commune of the Isère department in the Rhône-Alpes region of France.

The airport had 69,058 aircraft movements in 2009 and 72,493 in 2011.
