= HZB =

HZB may refer to:

- Helmholtz-Zentrum Berlin, a German research institute
- HZB, the IATA code for Merville–Calonne Airport, Nord, France
- Hezbollah, a Shi'ite party and paramilitary in Lebanon
