= Sud Aviation Caravelle =

French twin-jet narrow-body airliner produced 1958–1972

Caravelle
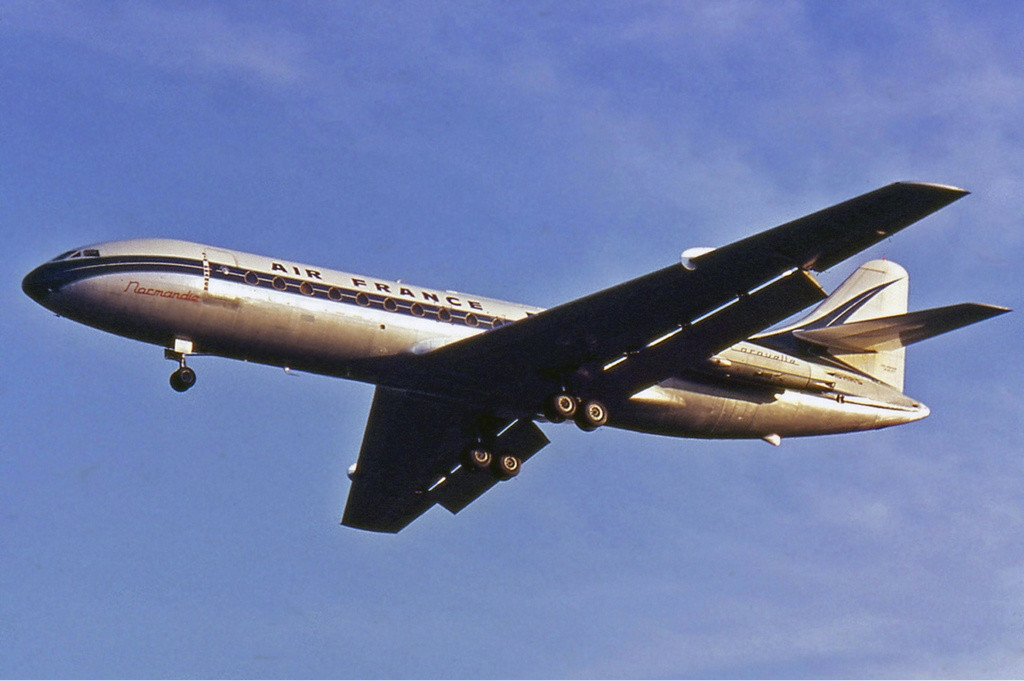
- Caravelle III

General information
- Type: Narrow-body jet airliner
- National origin: France
- Manufacturer: Sud Aviation
- Status: Retired
- Primary users: Air France Scandinavian Airlines; Swissair; Finnair
- Number built: 282

History
- Manufactured: 1958–1972
- Introduction date: 26 April 1959 with Scandinavian Airlines
- First flight: 27 May 1955
- Retired: 2005

The Sud Aviation SE 210 Caravelle is a rear-engine narrow-body jet airliner produced by French Sud Aviation. It was developed by SNCASE in the early 1950s, and made its maiden flight on May 27, 1955. It included some de Havilland designs and components developed for the de Havilland Comet, the first jet airliner. SNCASE merged into the larger Sud Aviation conglomerate before the aircraft entered revenue service on April 26, 1959, with Scandinavian Airlines System (SAS); 282 were built until production ended in 1972. It was ordered by airlines on every continent and operated until its retirement in 2005.

The short-range, five-abreast airliner is powered by two aft-mounted Rolls-Royce Avon turbojet engines, allowing a clean low wing. The configuration was later retained in many narrow-body aircraft and regional jets. The initial I, III and VI variants could seat 90 to 99 passengers over 1,650 to 2,500 kilometres (1,030 to 1,550 mi; 890 to 1,350 nmi). The later, slightly longer 10/11 variants could seat 99 to 118 passengers over 2,800 to 3,300 kilometres (1,700 to 2,100 mi; 1,500 to 1,800 nmi) and were powered by Pratt & Whitney JT8D low-bypass turbofans. The stretched Caravelle 12 could seat 131 over 3,200 kilometres (2,000 mi; 1,700 nmi).

== Development ==
=== Origins ===
On 12 October 1951, the Comité du matériel civil (civil aircraft committee) published a specification for a medium-range aircraft, which was later sent to the aviation industry by the Direction technique et industrielle. This called for an aircraft capable of carrying 55 to 65 passengers and 1,000 kg (2,200 lb) of cargo on routes up to 2,000 km (1,100 nmi; 1,200 mi) with a cruising speed of about 600 km/h (320 kn; 370 mph). The type and number of engines were not specified. Since 1946, various design studies for aircraft in this category had already been underway at several of the leading French aircraft manufacturing organisations, and had resulted in some ambitious concepts being mooted. None of these firms possessed the financial power to independently embark on the substantial development work involved, let alone to establish a manufacturing line for the construction of such aircraft.

The response to the specification from the French industry was strong, it has been claimed that every major manufacturer submitted at least one proposal; a total of 20 different designs were ultimately received. The majority of these proposals were powered by all-turbojet engine arrangements, although Breguet had entered a number of designs that were powered by both turbojet and turboprop engines; among these was one for a Snecma Atar-powered tri-jet to be developed in association with the SNCA du Nord and a turboprop type; all of the different designs were designated as Br. 978. Hurel-Dubois had entered several turboprop designs based on a narrow fuselage and shoulder-mounted wing, similar to many regional propliners. Proposals from SNCASO included the S.O.60 with two Rolls-Royce Avon RA.7 engines, outfitted with two smaller Turbomeca Marborés as auxiliaries. SNCASE had also returned a number of designs from the X-200 to X-210, all of these being purely jet-powered.

On 28 March 1952, after studying the various entries, the Comité du Matériel Civil announced that it had produced a short list of three entrants: the four-engined Avon/Marbore SNCASO S.0.60, the twin-Avon Hurel-Dubois project, and the three-engined Avon SNCASE X-210. At this point, British engine manufacturer Rolls-Royce had already begun to offer a new version of the Avon that was to be capable of developing 9,000 lbf (40 kN) of thrust, which would render the auxiliary engines of the S.O.60 and the third engine featured on the X-210 unnecessary. The Committee issued a request for SNCASE to re-submit its X-210 proposal as a twin-Avon design. In doing so, SNCASE decided to not remove the remaining engines from their rear-mounted position; most designs had placed the engines underneath the wing, where they could be mounted on the spar for lower overall weight, but it was felt that these weight savings were not worth the effort. This turned out to be a benefit to the design, as the cabin noise was greatly reduced as a result. In July 1952, the revised X-210 design with twin Avons was re-submitted to the Secretariat General for Civil and Commercial Aviation (SGACC).

=== Selection ===
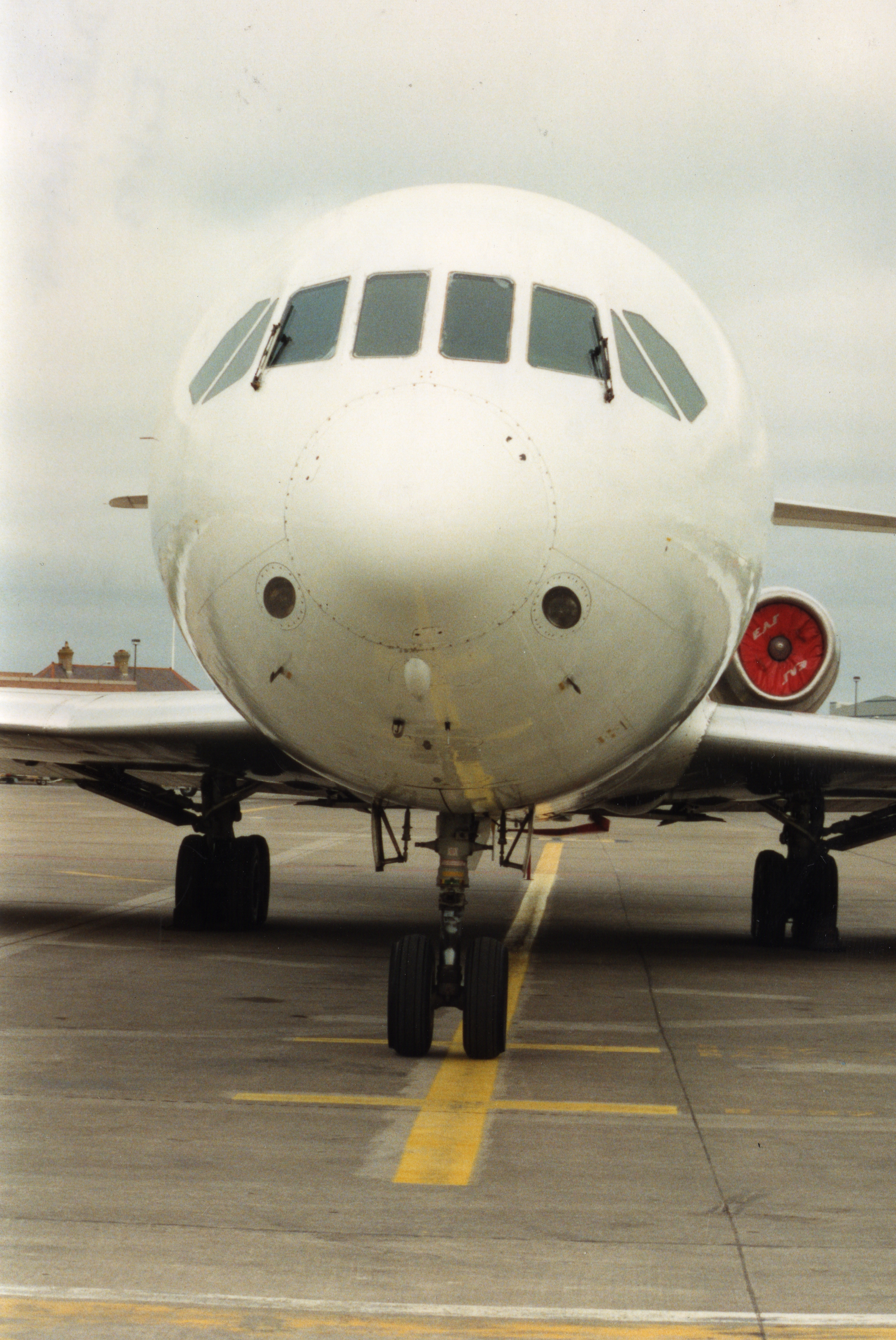
The unusual cockpit window arrangement of the Caravelle, licensed from the de Havilland Comet

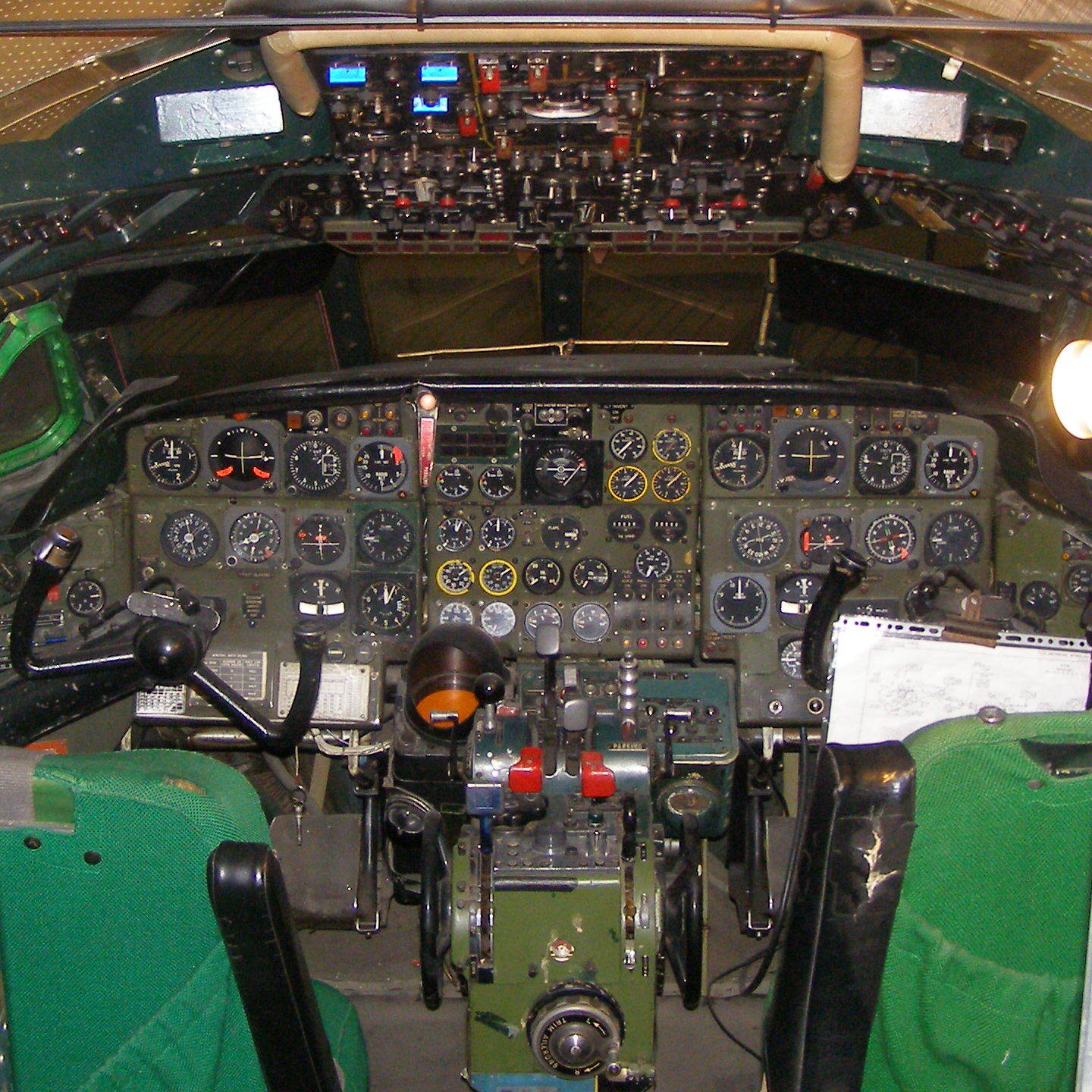
Cockpit

Two months later, SNCASE received official notification that its design had been accepted. On 6 July 1953, the SGACC placed a formal order for the construction of a pair of prototypes along with a pair of static airframes for fatigue testing. SNCASE's design licensed several fuselage features from British aircraft company de Havilland, the two companies already having had dealings in respect to several earlier designs. The nose area and cockpit layout were taken directly from the de Havilland Comet jet airliner, while the rest of the airliner was locally designed. A distinctive design feature was the cabin windows in the shape of a curved triangle, which were smaller than conventional windows but gave the same field of view downwards.

On 21 April 1955, the first prototype of the Caravelle (F-WHHH), launched by Madame de Gaulle, was rolled out. On 27 May 1955, the first prototype conducted its maiden flight, powered by a pair of British Rolls-Royce RA-26 Avon Mk.522, capable of providing 44.48 kN (10,000 lbf) of unitary thrust. For the maiden flight, which had a total duration of 41 minutes, the crew consisted of Pierre Nadot (Captain), André Moynot (First Officer), Jean Avril (mechanic), André Préneron (radio operator) and Roger Beteille.

Almost one year later, on 6 May 1956, the second prototype made its first flight. The first prototype had been fitted with a cargo door located on the lower left side of the fuselage, but this door was removed in the second prototype in favour of an all-seating arrangement. By October 1956, both prototypes had accumulated in excess of 1,000 flight hours. By the end of 1956, the two aircraft had visited various locations across Europe and North Africa; and trials were already underway for French carrier Air France. During 1957, the second prototype accumulated roughly 2,500 flight hours across various flights conducted throughout North America and South America.

In 1956, the type received its first order from Air France; it was followed by Scandinavian Airlines System (SAS) in 1957. More orders followed, which had been partially driven by a campaign of direct presentations held at airshows and dedicated flight demonstrations using the two prototypes to potential customers. Also during 1956, SNCASE (Sud-Est – Southeast) had merged with SNCASO (Sud-Ouest – Southwest) and several other French aircraft manufacturers to become Sud Aviation; however, the original SE designation assigned to the airliner was retained. In May 1959, the Caravelle received its airworthiness certification, enabling the type to enter passenger service. On 26 April 1959, the Caravelle performed its first flight with paying passengers on board for Scandinavian operator SAS; shortly thereafter, the type commenced operations with Air France as well.

=== Further development ===
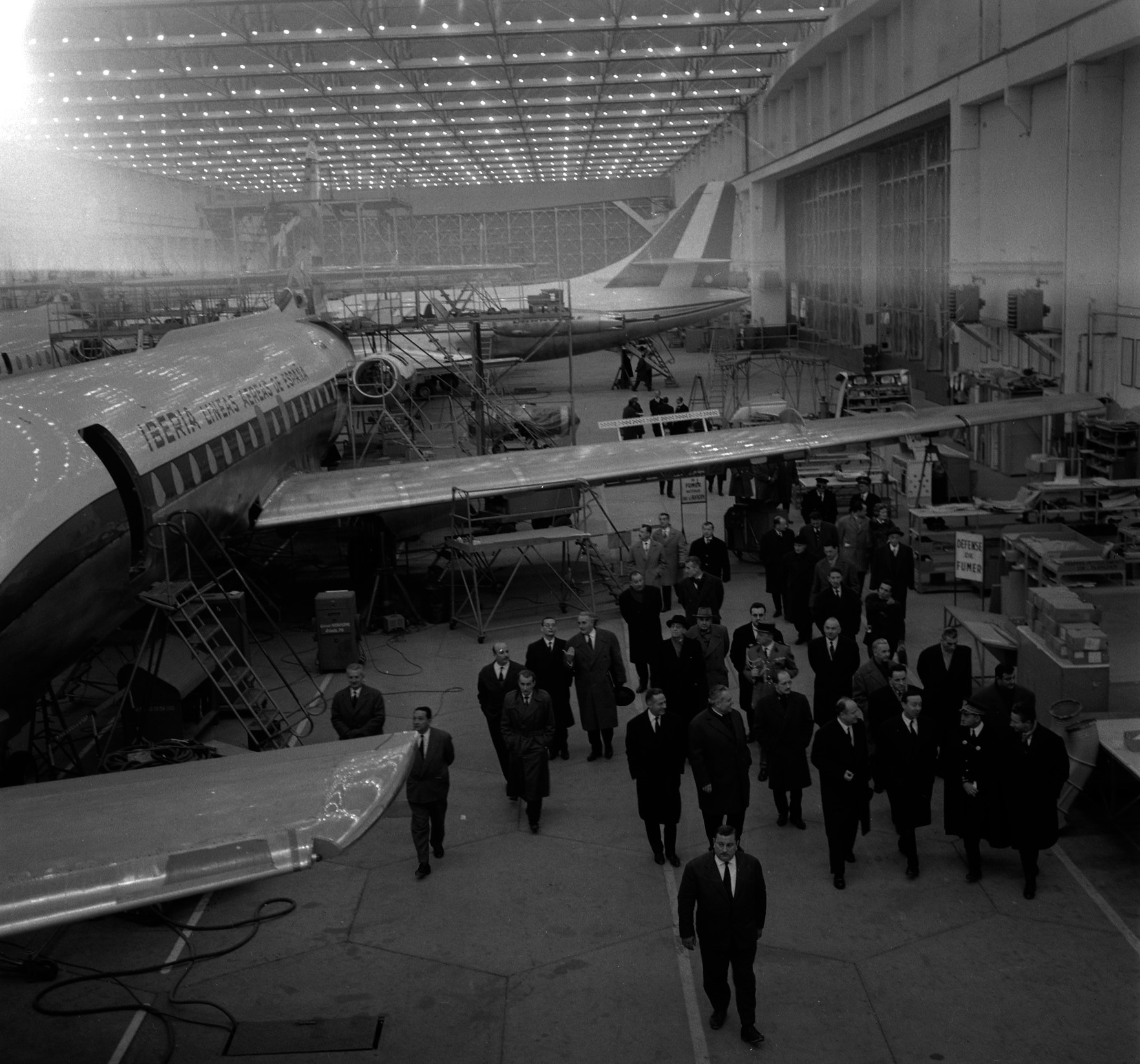
Assembly hall in 1962, during a visit of French prime minister Michel Debré

Within four years of entering airliner service, a total of 172 Caravelles had been sold to a range of operators. Aviation writer M.G. Douglas attributed the type's favourable early sales record to the effective marketing campaign of performing demonstrations to prospective customers using the two prototypes, as well to the Caravelle having effectively no jet-powered rivals, being the only short-haul jetliner for several years following its introduction. Several models of the Caravelle were developed and produced over the lifetime of the production run, often in response to the increasing power of the available engines, which allowed higher takeoff weights to be adopted.

By 1963, there were a total of six different versions of the Caravelle in production, designated III, VI-N, VI-R, 10A, 10B, and X-BIR. Of these, the Caravelle III was considered to be the basic version of the airliner, while the other variants featured an increasing number of improvements. The Caravelle VI-N was equipped with more powerful Avon 531 engines and an additional heat exchanger for the air conditioning, while the Caravelle VI-R, which had come about as a result of demands by U.S. carrier United Airlines, was furnished with thrust reverser-equipped Avon 352s, a revised windscreen design, soundproofing, a new luggage compartment door, and wing spoilers.

The Caravelle 10A and 10B, which differed only in the engines used and were commonly referred to as the Super Caravelle (not to be confused with the later supersonic transport design), featured the improvements of the VI-R in addition to a high degree of further design changes. The more high-profile modifications included a stretch of the fuselage by 84 centimetres (33 in); a highly altered wing; an aerodynamic fairing behind the fin of the tailplane; expanded cargo capacity via raised floor support struts; and higher cabin windows. Other changes included the adoption of variable-displacement pumps for the hydraulic system and the use of AC-based generators in place of earlier DC counterparts along with an auxiliary power unit (APU). The redesigned wing was equipped with double-slotted Fowler flaps, additional and repositioned stall vanes, aerodynamic improvements to the wing root and adjustments to the leading edge that improved the performance of the wing during the crucial takeoff and landing phases of flight.

Despite its commercial success, however, the Caravelle was soon displaced from being the focus of Sud Aviation's development efforts as the majority of the company's design engineers were progressively reallocated onto an entirely new project that was intended to produce a successor to the Caravelle. The project was relatively ambitious, having the aim of producing a viable supersonic transport that possessed the same general size and range as the Caravelle. It was decided that the envisioned supersonic airliner should be naturally named after the firm's recent success, thus the Super-Caravelle name was applied to the design. Ultimately, the work on the Super-Caravelle would be merged with similar work that had been undertaken by Britain's Bristol Aeroplane Company, and would result in the development of Concorde.

In total, 282 Caravelles of all types were manufactured (2 prototypes or pre-production aircraft and 280 production aircraft); reportedly, Sud Aviation's projected break-even point for the type had been forecast to be around the 200-unit mark.

== Design ==
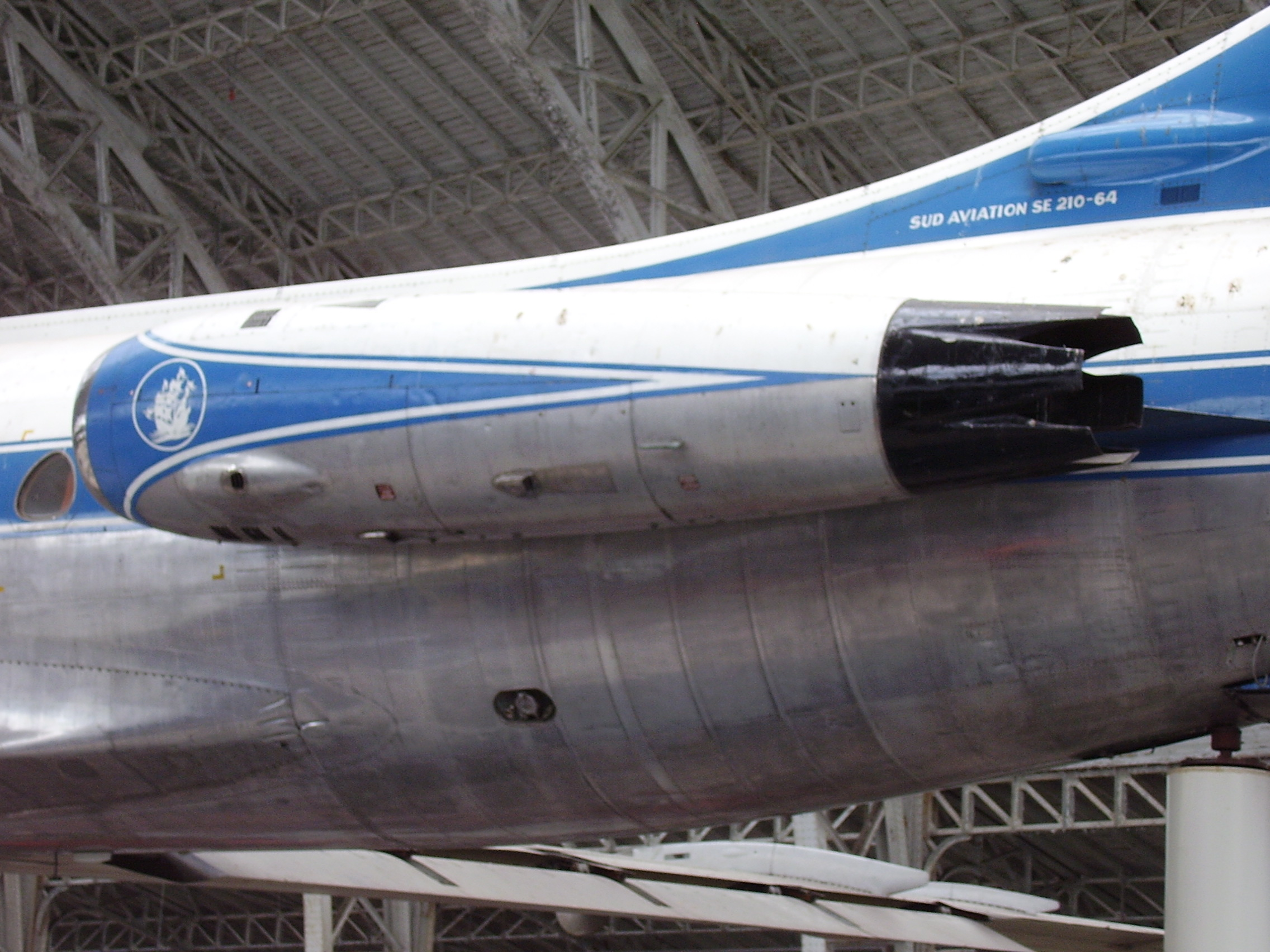
Rear fuselage of a Caravelle, showing its Rolls-Royce Avon turbojet engine

The Caravelle belongs to the first generation of passenger aircraft to use newly developed jet propulsion technology, and it was the first jet airliner developed specifically for the short/medium-range sector of the market. Early in the Caravelle's career, its chief competitors were propeller-driven aircraft, such as the British-built Vickers Viscount and the U.S.-built Convair CV-440. Reportedly, the Caravelle proved to be a highly reliable airliner during its early years of service. The low accident rate for the type led to lower than average insurance premiums for Caravelle operators.

The Caravelle was typically powered by a pair of British-built Rolls-Royce Avon turbojet engines, installed in a rear-mounted position close to the tail unit. Various models of the Avon engine were adopted for different versions of the airliner, often with increased thrust and additional features such as thrust reversers. Alternative powerplants were adopted or proposed for some Caravelle models, such as the U.S.-built Pratt & Whitney JT8D-1 and General Electric CJ-805-23C engines.

The Caravelle was designed to maximise passenger comfort and operator convenience. The rear entry door had built-in stairs that, while adding structural complexity, meant that mobile airport stairs were unnecessary. On later variants, soundproofing in the form of readily removable mattress-like rolls that fixed in place via existing brackets was added to the design. In some configurations, the Caravelle's cabin was furnished with a number of rearward-facing passenger seats, which was an uncommon arrangement amongst civil aircraft. From September 1963 onwards, an autolanding capability (via two separate systems, of which one was self-contained while the other was integrated with the airliner's autopilot), was made available for the Caravelle by Sud Aviation.

The Sud Aviation Caravelle featured a highly distinctive and iconic passenger cabin window design, characterized by its "trianguloid" or rounded-triangular shape. This teardrop configuration utilized a broad base and a tapering top, a geometric choice engineered to safely distribute internal cabin pressurization loads and mitigate localized stress concentrations. Beyond its structural purpose, the design incorporated passenger ergonomics based on research showing that travelers primarily look downward at the landscape; the wide lower edge maximized the lateral panoramic view, while the narrow upper portion effectively blocked harsh, direct high-altitude sunlight and reduced cabin glare.

The final assembly line for the Caravelle was at Sud Aviation's factory at Blagnac Airport near Toulouse. Much of the aircraft was manufactured at other sites across France and in other countries, however. The production of large portions of the Caravelle had been subcontracted to other manufacturers; these included the Italian aircraft manufacturer Fiat Aviazione, which produced the aircraft's tailplane, fin, ailerons, and engine nacelles; and French aviation firm Breguet Aviation, which performed the outfitting of the rear fuselage; while much of the ancillary equipment of the Caravelle originated from either British or U.S. manufacturers. Sud Aviation constructed and outfitted the nose section, along with manufacturing the tailcone, rudder, Fowler flaps, both the leading edges and trailing edges of the wing, and the majority of the fuselage.

== Variants ==
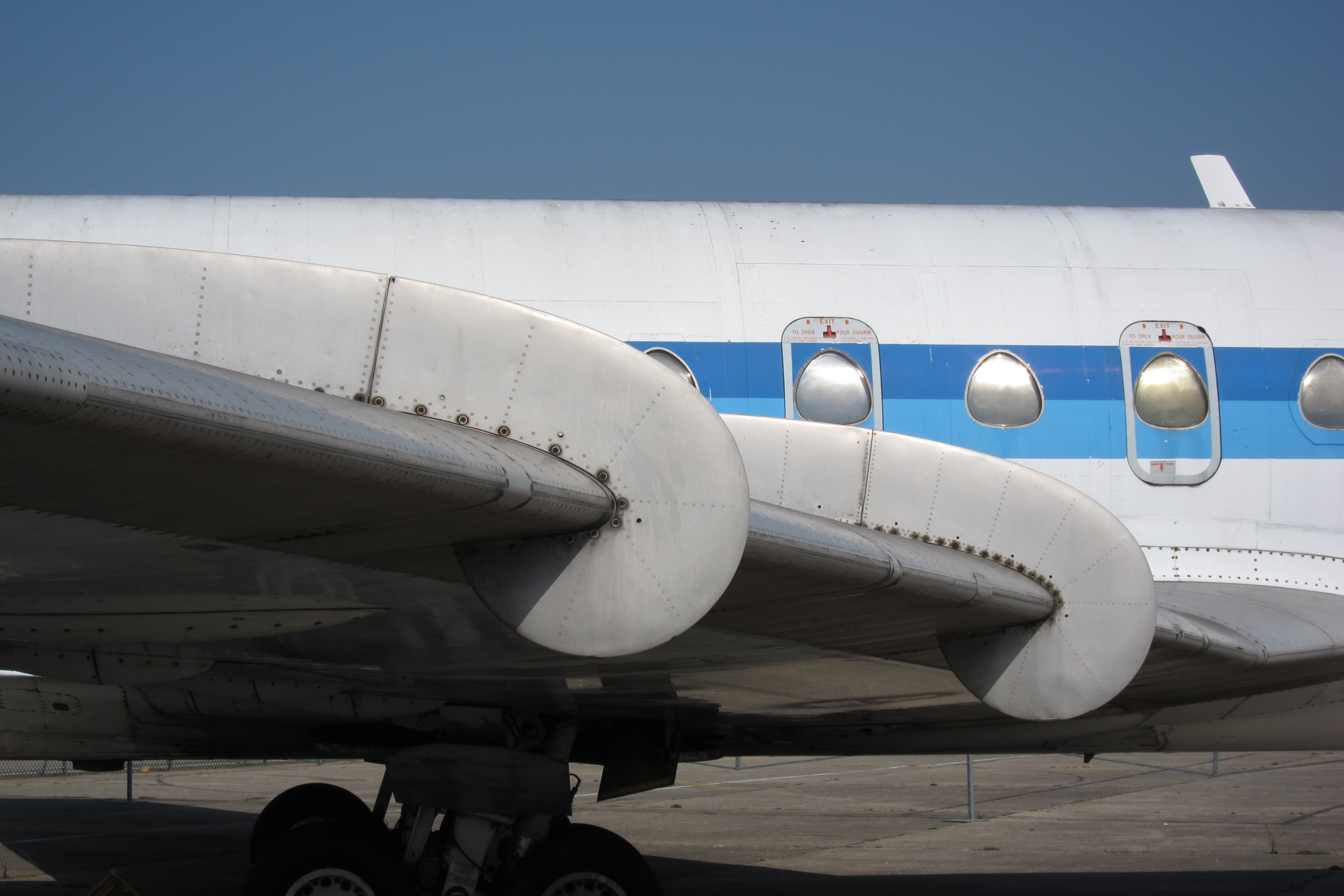
The triangular windows of the Caravelle remained unaltered throughout its development.

Variants
Variant	Length	Engines	Passengers
Caravelle I	32.01 m (105 ft 0 in)	RA-29 Mk.522	80
Caravelle IA	32.01 m (105 ft 0 in)	RA-29 Mk.522A	80
Caravelle III	32.01 m (105 ft 0 in)	RA-29 Mk.527 and 527B	80
Caravelle VI-N	32.01 m (105 ft 0 in)	RA-29 Mk.531 and 531B	80
Caravelle VI-R	32.01 m (105 ft 0 in)	RA-29 Mk.533R	80
Caravelle 10R	32.01 m (105 ft 0 in)	P&W JT8D-7	80
Caravelle 11R	32.71 m (107 ft 4 in)	P&W JT8D-7	89–99
Caravelle 10B	33.01 m (108 ft 4 in)	P&W JT8D-7	105
Caravelle 12	36.24 m (118 ft 11 in)	P&W JT8D-9	140

Caravelle I
Similar to the original prototypes; first flew on 14 May 1958. This variant was powered by two Rolls-Royce RA-29 Avon Mk.522 with 46.71 kN (10,500 lbf) of unitary thrust and a capacity of 80 passengers. French certification was obtained on 2 April 1959, and U.S. certification was obtained six days later. The first revenue flight took place that year with Air France on the Paris-Rome-Athens–Istanbul route. Air France Caravelle registration F-BHRB "Lorraine" was introduced in the Paris-London route on 27 July 1959.
Sales: 20 were sold; to Air France (10), SAS (6), Air Algérie (2) and VARIG (2). One of the VARIG aircraft was leased by Sud to Air Vietnam and Middle East Airlines before delivery to Royal Air Maroc. In Australia, Trans Australia Airlines had planned to re-equip with the Caravelle but as Ansett felt this was too advanced at that stage for its own needs, under Australia's Two Airlines Policy both airlines were required to purchase the Ansett preference (the less-advanced turbo-prop Lockheed L-188 Electra).

Caravelle IA
This variant had the same external configuration as variant I but with more powerful engines, the Rolls-Royce Avon RA-29/1 Mk.526 giving improved capabilities. The first flight took place on 11 February 1960. Caravelle I and IA aircraft were later converted to the III variant.
Sales: 12 built. Deliveries were to Air France, SAS, Air Algérie, Finnair, and Royal Air Maroc.

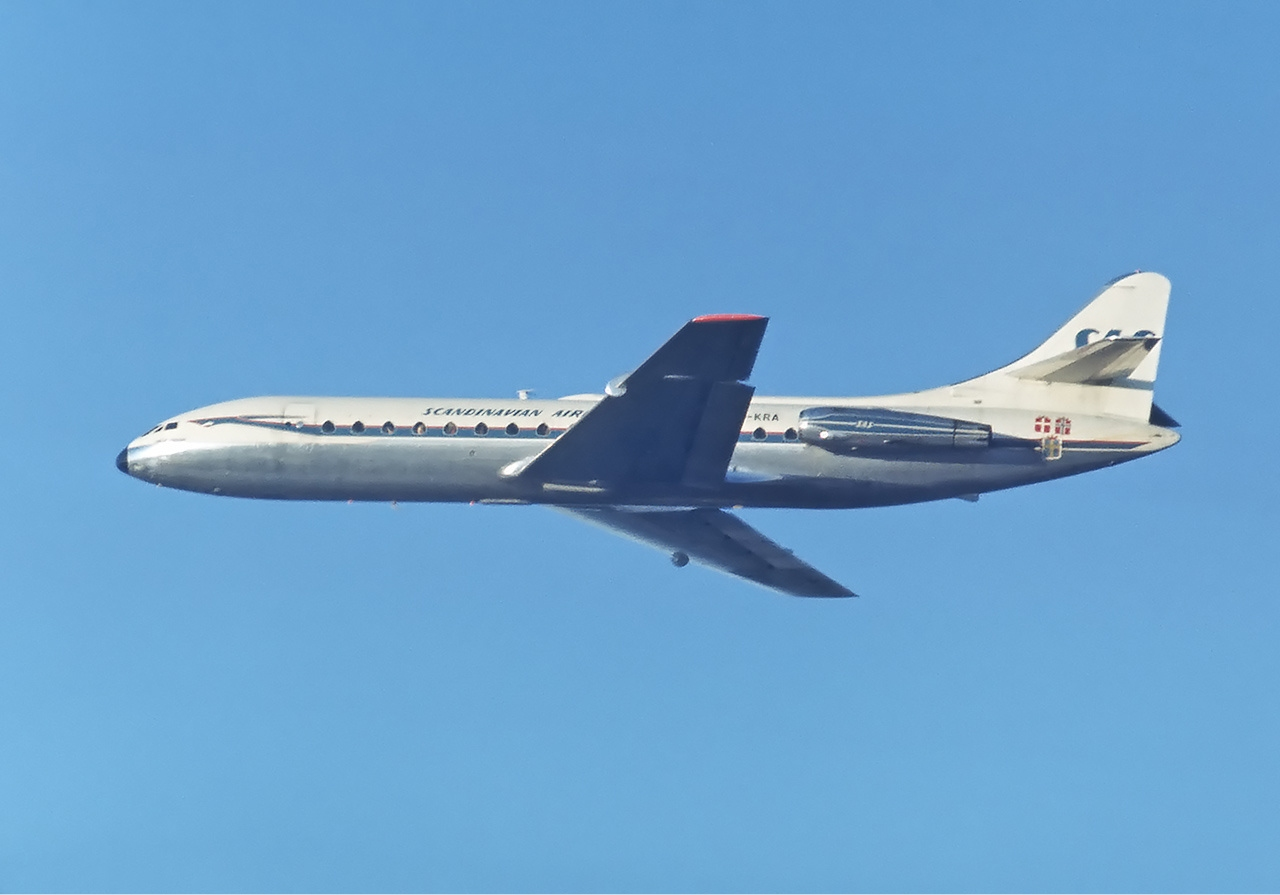
SAS Caravelle III, powered by Rolls-Royce Avon turbojets

Caravelle III
Later improvements to the Avon led to the Caravelle III. It first flew on 30 December 1959, entering service with Alitalia in April 1960. The Caravelle III was powered by Rolls-Royce Avon RA-29/3 Mk.527 and RA-29/3 Mk.527B engines, both with 50.7 kN (11,400 lbf) of unitary thrust.
Sales: The Series III was the best-selling Caravelle with 78 built. All but one of the 32 Series Is built were upgraded to Series III standard. Air Inter used 16 of this type for its domestic routes. Major deliveries were to Air France, as well as aircraft for Swissair, Alitalia, SAS, and Royal Air Maroc.

Caravelle VI-N
N standing for "normal". A version with more powerful Avon RA-29/6 Mk 531 and RA 29/6 Mk 531B engines producing 54.28 kN (12,200 lbf) of unitary thrust. The capabilities were improved and the weights increased; the actual payload was reduced. The Caravelle VI-N first flew on 10 September 1960, beginning service with Belgian airline Sabena in January 1961. Five of the 78 Series IIIs were upgraded to Series VI-N.
Sales: 53 built. Deliveries to Saeta, Corse Air, Europe A.S., Minerve, Indian Airlines and Yugoslav Airlines.

Caravelle VI-R
First Caravelle with thrust reversers. The cockpit windows were made larger with redesigned layout and more powerful brakes were introduced. It first flew on 6 February 1961, obtaining U.S. certification on 5 June that same year. It began service with United Airlines on 14 July. The VI-R was powered by Avon Ra-29 Mk. 533R and Mk 535R (R, for Reverse) engines with a unitary thrust of 56.05 kN (12,600 lbf).
Sales: 56 built, 20 for United Airlines. Other series VI customers included Indian Airlines (9), Panair do Brasil (4), Cruzeiro do Sul (4), Iberia Líneas Aéreas De España (4), LAN Chile (3), Aerolíneas Argentinas (3) and TAP Portugal (3). This model was also used by Filipinas Orient Airways , Aerocesar, Airborne Express and SA Nacionales.

Caravelle VII
This was a Series III (c/n 042) that was purchased by General Electric, ferried to the United States as Santa Marian 9 and equipped with General Electric CJ805 aft-fan engines, becoming, in effect, the engine test-bed for the Caravelle 10A. Flight tests with the new engines began on 29 December 1960 and a second aircraft was planned to be converted, but this aircraft became the sole Caravelle 10A.

Caravelle 10A
Based on the Series VII, but intended for the U.S. market, the 10A was 1 metre (3 ft 3 in) longer than the Series VI, with the windows located 200 mm (7.9 in) higher on the fuselage. The sole prototype was powered by two 72 kN (16,100 lbf) General Electric CJ-805-23C aft-fan engines and flew for the first time on 31 August 1962. A modified wing with improved flaps was fitted to meet U.S. certification requirements, as was an auxiliary power unit (APU) in the rear fuselage. Trans World Airlines (TWA) cancelled its order for 20 aircraft due to financial problems, however, and by the time TWA was in a position to purchase new aircraft, the Douglas DC-9 was preferred. After testing the prototype was scrapped.

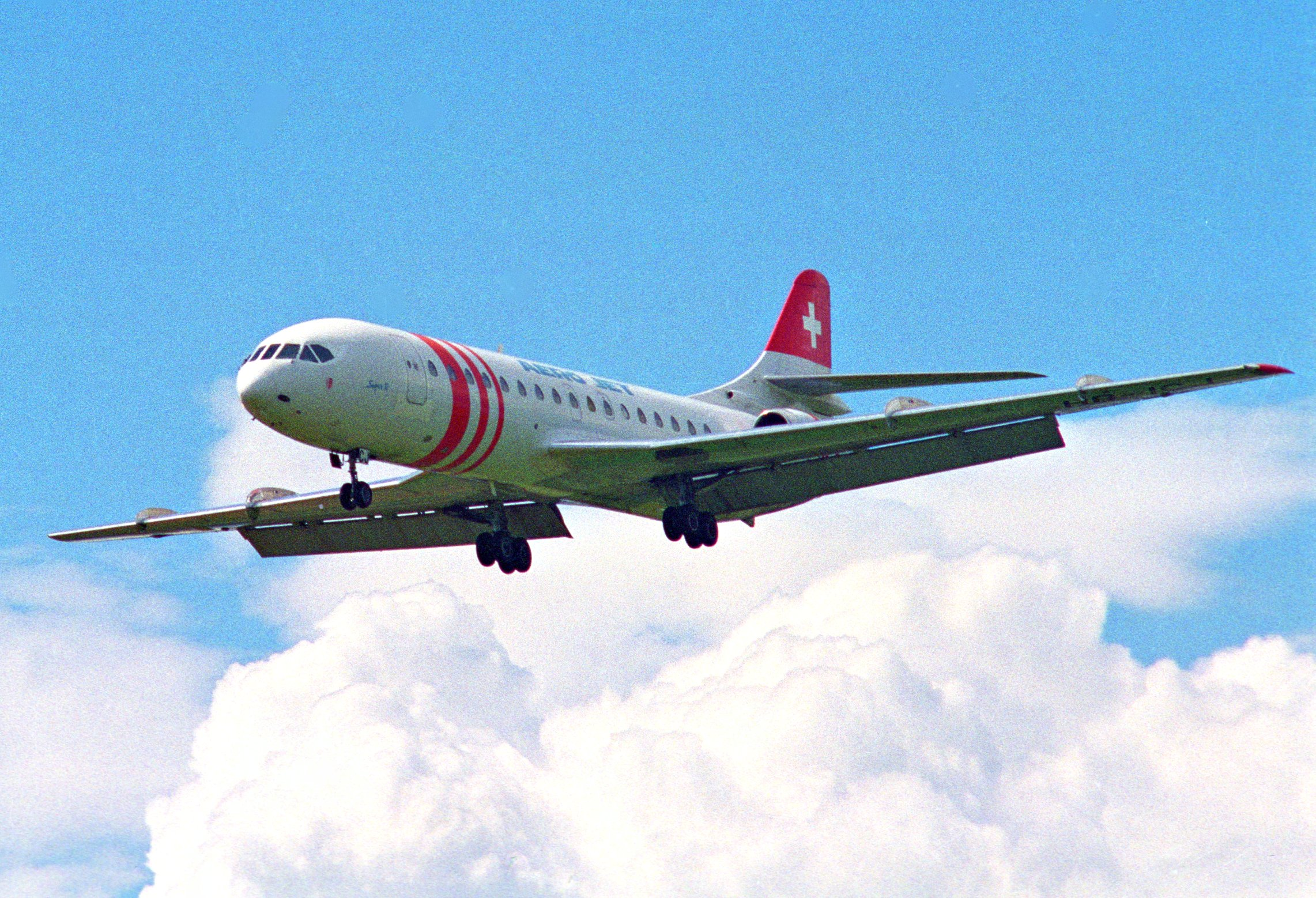
The 10B Super Caravelle, 1.4 m (4.6 ft) longer, powered by Pratt & Whitney JT8D turbofans

Caravelle 10B (Super Caravelle)
Based on the Series 10A, this variant offered many modifications in respect to other series. It introduced a leading edge extension (a fillet added to the front of an aircraft wings in order to provide usable airflow at high angles of attack). The wing had plain flaps instead of the earlier models' double-slotted Fowler flaps and the fuselage was extended 1.40 m (4 ft 7 in), with an increase in passenger capacity to 105. The engines used were the new Pratt & Whitney JT8D turbofan engines with 62.3 kN (14,000 lbf) of unitary thrust. The 10B first flew on August 31, 1964 and was produced as a run of 22 aircraft.
Launch customer and primary operator of the 10B was Finnair with 8 examples. Aviaco ordered 5 but this was cancelled, with those aircraft going to Sterling Airways, LTU, and Iberia Airlines. Alia and Union des Transports Aériens (UTA) also acquired aircraft. The last operational Caravelle was a Type 3 10B that flew with Waltair until 2005.

Caravelle 10R
A combination of the 10B's engines on the Series VI-R fuselage, creating a smaller but higher powered aircraft. Maximum weight at take-off was increased to 52 tonnes (115,000 lb), (6,000 kg (13,000 lb) more than the Series I and 2,000 kg (4,400 lb) more than the Series VI-R). It first flew on 8 January 1965 and received U.S. certification on 23 May of that same year.
A total of 20 were built, starting service with Alia on July 31, 1965. It also flew with Aero Lloyd, CTA, Hispania and SAT, among others.

Caravelle 11R
The 11R had a fuselage length of 31.72 m (104 ft 1 in), (70 cm (28 in) more than other variants) and incorporated a 3.32 m × 1.84 m (10.9 ft × 6.0 ft) cargo door in the port side. This enabled it to carry a mixed load of passengers and cargo. First flight of the series 11R was on 21 April 1967.
Only six were built, delivered to Air Afrique, Air Congo, and Transeuropa of Spain.

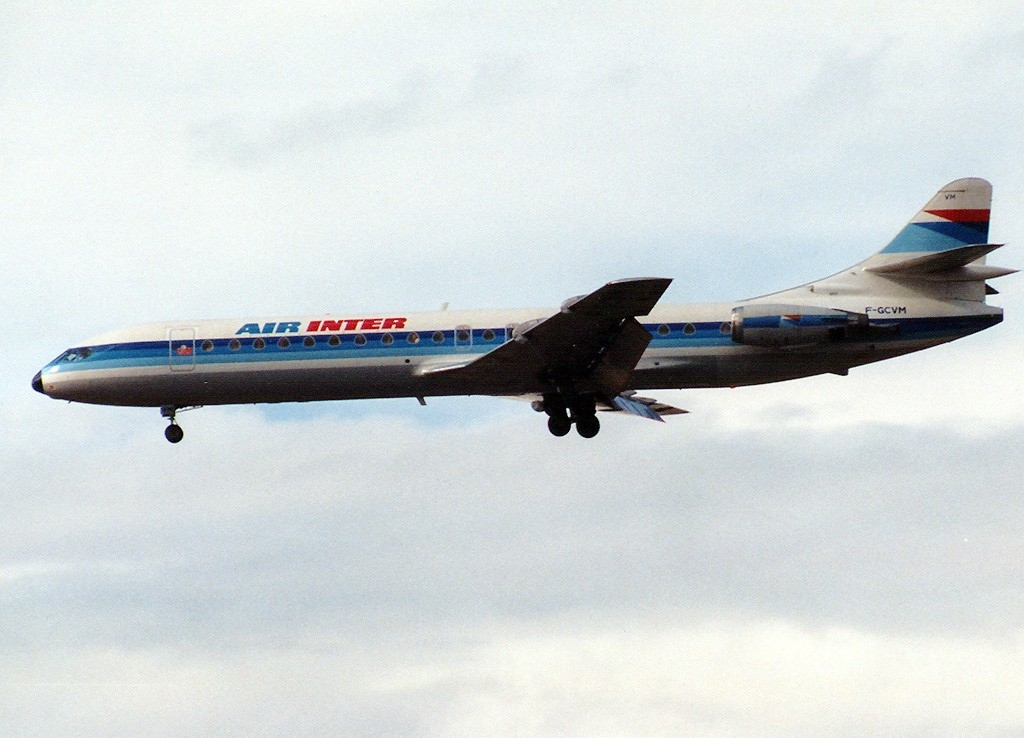
A Caravelle 12 of Air Inter, lengthened by 3.2 m (10 ft)

Caravelle 12 (Super Caravelle)
This was the last version of the Caravelle to appear, first flying on 12 March 1971. The Series 12 was a 10B with a noticeably longer fuselage, stretched by 3.2 m (10 ft 6 in), and a newer uprated version of the JT8D engines with 64.50 kN (14,500 lbf) of unitary thrust. This allowed for up to 140 passengers over a reduced range. The Caravelle 12 was aimed primarily at the charter market, produced 12 examples starting in 1972. By this point Concorde was in production; this design was originally known in France as Sud Aviation Super-Caravelle. The Caravelle 12 was often also referred to by this name.
The launch customer for the Series 12 was Sterling Airways with seven delivered, while the remaining five went to Air Inter. Series 12s flew in Europe until October 1996, and in Africa until more recently.
The unit cost was US$5.5M. (1972)

== Operators ==
The Caravelle served with airlines on every continent except Australia. In 1957, Trans-Australia Airlines (TAA) sought to order two Caravelles, to service its longest routes, Perth-Sydney and Perth-Melbourne, from 1960. However, the Australian government blocked the order, saying that any further diversity in full-size airliners used on domestic routes would have an adverse impact on aircraft servicing within Australia.

=== Civil operators ===
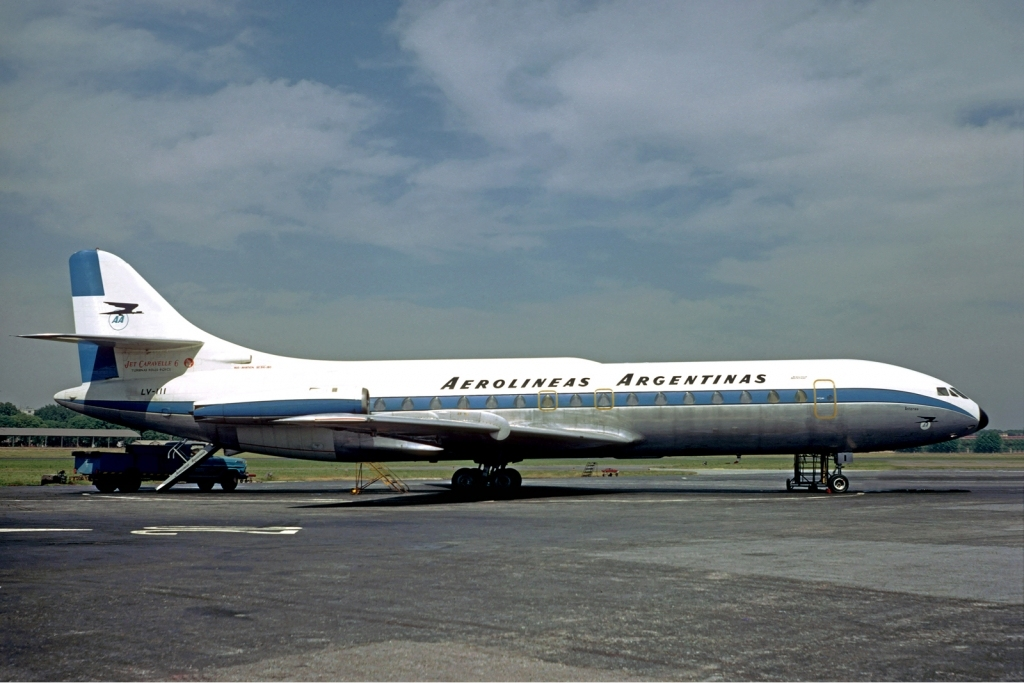
Aerolineas Argentinas 1973

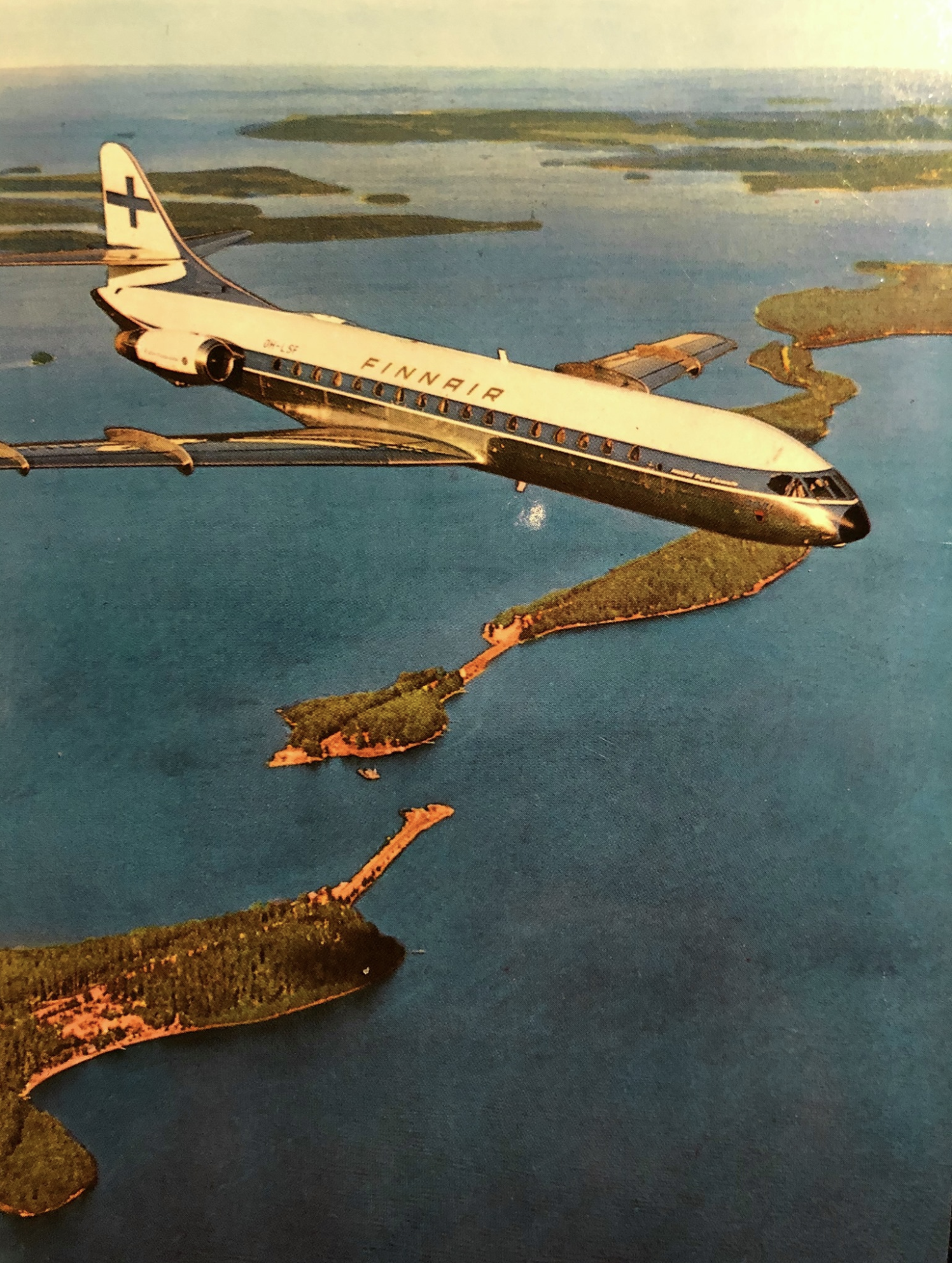
Finnair

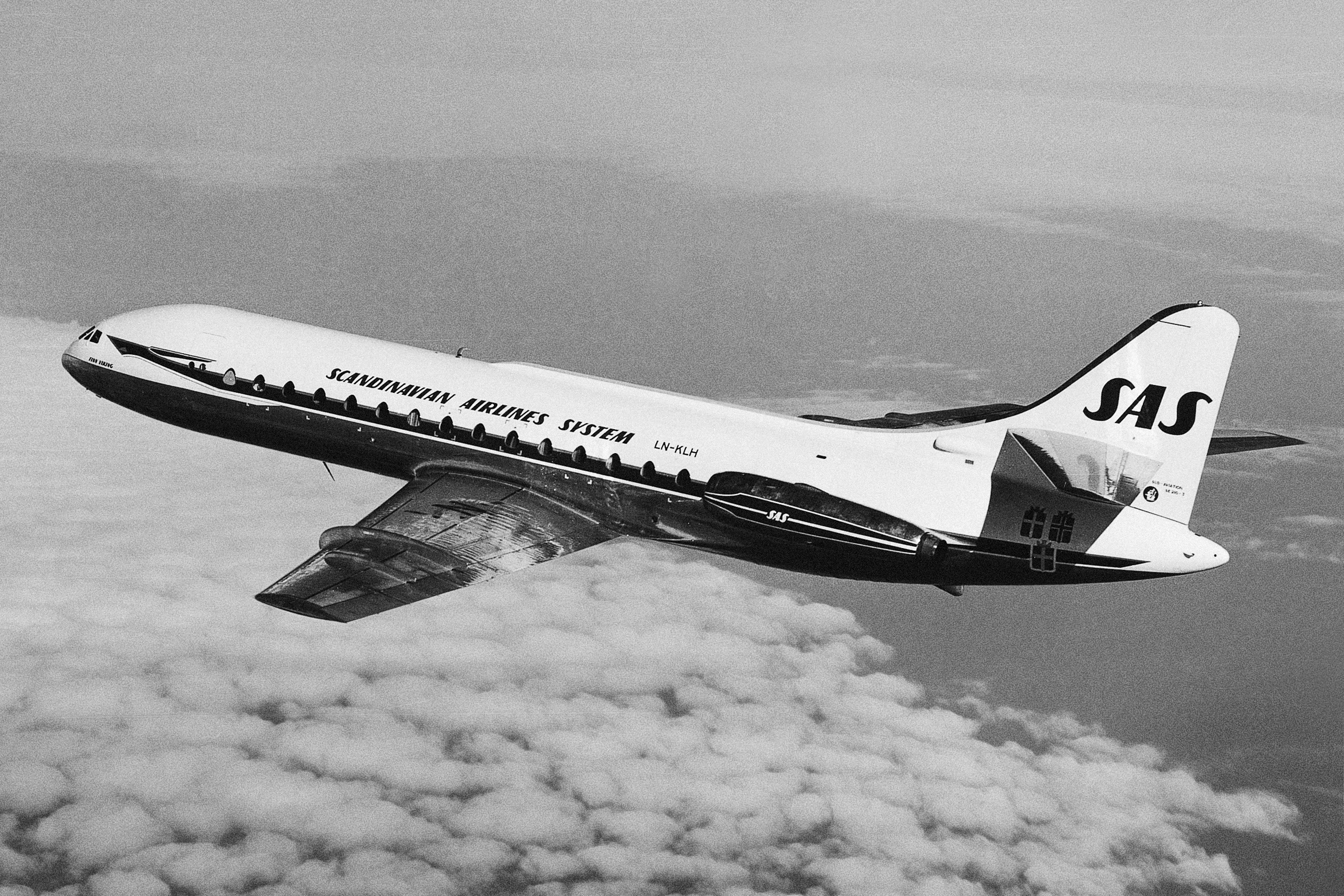
SAS

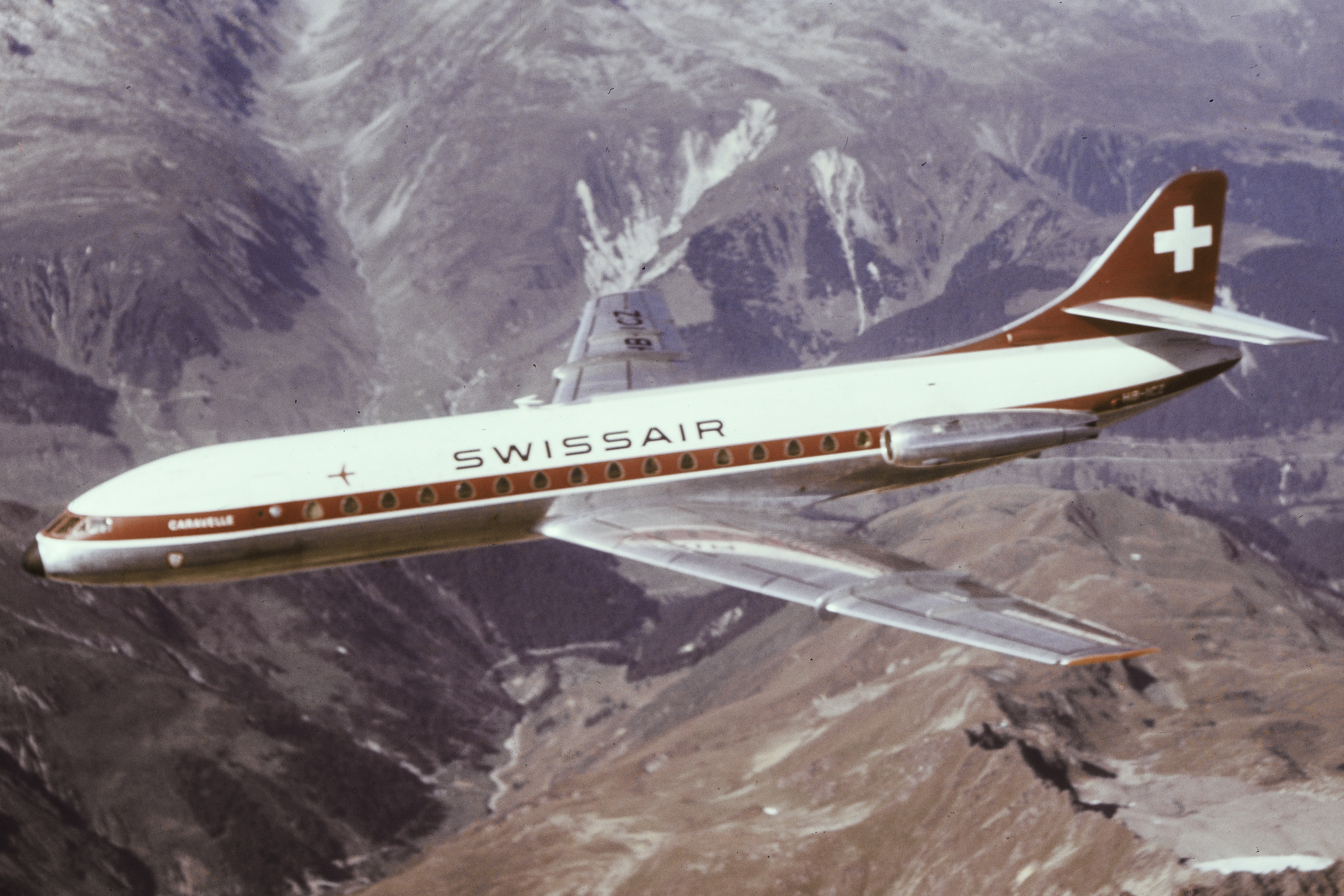
Swissair

Algeria

- Air Algérie

Argentina

- Aerolíneas Argentinas (1962–1973)

Austria

- Austrian Airlines

Belgium

- Belgian International Air Services
- SABENA
- Sobelair

Brazil

- Cruzeiro do Sul
- Panair do Brasil
- VARIG

Burundi

- Air Burundi

Cambodia

- Air Cambodge

Central African Republic

- Air Centrafrique

Chile

- Lan Chile

Côte d'Ivoire

- Air Afrique

Colombia

- Aerotal Colombia
- Aerocesar Colombia

Congo

- Air Congo
- Waltair (DR Congo)

Denmark

- Alisardia
- Aviaction
- Sterling Airways

Ecuador

- SAETA
- SAN Ecuador

Egypt

- Egyptair (Leased from Sterling)

Finland

- Finnair

France

- Aerotour
- Air Charter International
- Air France
- Air Inter
- Air Martinique
- Air Provence
- Catair
- Corse Air
- Euralair
- Europe Aero Service
- Minerve
- Trans-Union
- Union des Transports Aeriens

Gabon

- Air Gabon
- Gabon Express

Germany

- Aero Lloyd (1980)
- LTU
- Lufthansa (leased)
- Panair (leased)
- Special Air Transport (SAT)

India

- Indian Airlines
- Pushpaka

Italy

- Aerolinee Itavia
- Alitalia
- Altair
- Società Aerea Mediterranea

Jordan

- Alia

Laos

- Royal Air Lao

Lebanon

- Air Liban
- Middle East Airlines

Libya

- Kingdom of Libya Airlines

Luxembourg

- Luxair

Mali

- Air Mali

Morocco

- Royal Air Maroc

Martinique

- Air Martinique

New Caledonia

- Air Caledonie International

Netherlands

- Transavia

Philippines

- Filipinas Orient Airways
- Sterling Philippines Airways
- Transasian Airways

Portugal

- TAP Air Portugal

Spain

- Aviaco
- Iberia Airlines
- TAE
- Transeuropa

Scandinavia

- SAS, Scandinavian Airlines System Operated 1959-1974 The carrier took delivery of the first aircraft of the type in 1959.

South Vietnam

- Air Vietnam

Sweden

- Transwede Operated 1985-1990

Switzerland

- Air City
- Balair
- CTA
- SATA
- Swissair

Syria

- Syrian Arab Airlines

Taiwan

- China Airlines
- Far Eastern Air Transport

Thailand

- Thai Airways International

Tunisia

- Tunisair

Turkey

- Istanbul Airlines

United States

- Independent Air for Atlanta Skylarks
- Midwest Air Charter/Airborne Express
- United Airlines

Venezuela

- Avensa
- VIASA (leased)

Yugoslavia

- Air Yugoslavia
- Inex Adria Aviopromet
- JAT Yugoslav Airlines

Zaire

- Affro Cargo
- Air Zaire

=== Military and government operators ===
Algeria

- Algerian Air Force

Argentina

- Argentine Air Force (1973–1975)

Central African Republic

- Central African Empire/Republic Government (1970–1979)

Chad

- Chad Government

France

- French Air Force

Gabon

- Gabon Government (1976–1978)

Mauritania

- Mauritanian Government

Mexico

- Mexican Air Force

Rwanda

- Rwanda Government

Senegal

- Senegal Government

Sweden

- Swedish Air Force designated TP 85 two ex-SAS aircraft were used as electronic intelligence aircraft 1974–1998.

Yugoslavia

- Yugoslav Air Force

== Incidents and accidents ==
For 45 years of commercial operation, 67 Caravelles have been withdrawn from service as a result of destruction or for irreparable damage. None of these accidents and incidents are attributed to a design defect, only a few technical failures, human errors, or sabotage. The total loss of life in accidents in the Caravelle is more than 1,300. The accident rate per million flights is estimated at more than 5.5, compared with less than 1 for the most recent airliners.

- 19 January 1960 – Scandinavian Airlines System Flight 871, a Caravelle I, crashed at Esenboga Airport, Turkey due to excessive descent for reasons unknown. Seven crew members and 35 passengers lost their lives.
- 19 May 1960 — A Caravelle of Air Algérie, F-OBNI, collided with a Stampe single-engine biplane on approach to Paris-Orly and managed to land. The small aircraft was destroyed and its pilot was killed, as well as one passenger of the Caravelle, 18 other persons on board were injured.
- 12 September 1961 – Air France Flight 2005, a Caravelle III, crashed near Rabat, Morocco after the crew misread instruments, killing all 77 on board.
- 27 September 1961 – Varig Flight 592-J, a Caravelle III, crashed when landing at Brasília International Airport in Brazil, caught fire and was totally destroyed. Despite this, there were no casualties. Among the passengers were the governor of the Rio Grande do Sul state, Leonel Brizola, and three ministers of state of the newly sworn president João Goulart. This was the first air accident in the new Brazilian capital, founded only 16 months before.
- 4 September 1963 – Swissair Flight 306 crashed shortly after take-off from Zürich following an in-flight fire, killing all 80 people on board.
- 18 April 1964 – Middle East Airlines Flight 444 (registration OD-AEM) crashed at night into the Persian Gulf, 10 miles out from Dhahran Airport, Saudi Arabia, killing all 49 on board; the cause was never determined.
- 15 February 1966 – an Indian Airlines Caravelle VI-N registered as VT-DPP crashed short of the runway at Palam Airport in poor visibility, killing two of 80 on board.
- 4 September 1966 – an Indian Airlines Caravelle VI-N registered as VT-DSB struck a hill at 800 feet during a training flight, killing the four crew.
- 30 June 1967 – Thai Airways International Flight 601, a Caravelle III, crashed into the sea while landing at Hong Kong's Kai Tak Airport during a tropical heavy rainstorm. Twenty-four people were killed.
- 4 November 1967 – Iberia Airlines Flight 062, a Caravelle 10R, struck Blackdown Hill, Sussex, United Kingdom, killing all 37 passengers and crew.
- 11 September 1968 – Air France Flight 1611, a Caravelle III en route from the island of Corsica to Nice, France, crashed into the Mediterranean Sea off Nice following an in-flight fire, killing all 95 on board; in 2011 a report surfaced that a missile may have shot down the aircraft.
- 28 December 1968 – two Middle East Airlines Caravelle VI-Ns (registrations OD-AEE and OD-AEF), along with 12 other aircraft, were destroyed at Beirut International Airport by Israeli commandos in retaliation for a terrorist attack on a Boeing aircraft in Athens.
- 26 July 1969 – an Air Algérie Caravelle VI-N (registration 7T-VAK) crashed at near Hassi Messaoud Airport, Algeria killing 33 passengers and crew out of 37. The aircraft crashed onto the runway while attempting an emergency landing due to an in-flight fire.
- 8 October 1969 – A Cruzeiro do Sul Caravelle VI-R en route from Belém-Val de Cães to Manaus-Ponta Pelada in Brazil was hijacked by four people who demanded to be flown to Cuba. The hijacking lasted less than a day and there were no casualties.
- 1 April 1970 – a Royal Air Maroc Caravelle III registered as CN-CCV crashed on approach to Casablanca following a loss of control, killing 61 of 72 on board.
- 20 November 1971 – China Airlines Flight 825, a Caravelle III (registration B-1852), crashed near Penghu, Taiwan due to a possible bomb explosion, killing all 25 passengers and crew on board.
- 7 January 1972 – Iberia Airlines Flight 602 crashed into a mountain while on approach to Ibiza Airport, Spain. All 104 passengers and crew were killed.
- 14 March 1972 – Sterling Airways Flight 296 crashed 20 mi west of Kalba, United Arab Emirates due to pilot error, killing all 112 passengers and crew in the worst ever accident involving the Caravelle. The accident is also the deadliest in the United Arab Emirates.
- 1 June 1973 – Cruzeiro do Sul Flight 109, a Caravelle VI-N (registration PP-PDX) operating from Belém-Val de Cans to São Luís crashed on approach to São Luís. The left engine lost power and the aircraft attained an extreme nose-up attitude. It stalled and crashed 760m to the right of the runway. All 23 passengers and crew died.
- 13 August 1973 – Aviaco Flight 118 crashed near A Coruña, Spain, killing all 85 passengers and crew, while attempting to land at Alvedro Airport (now A Coruña Airport) in heavy fog.
- 11 September 1973 – JAT Airways Flight 769, a Caravelle VI-N, struck Babin Zub Peak while on approach to Titograd Airport, killing all 41 passengers and crew on board. The accident remains the worst in Montenegro.
- 22 December 1973 – A Sobelair Caravelle VI-N operating for Royal Air Maroc) Caravelle VI-N (OO-SRD) struck Mount Mellaline while on approach to Tangier Airport, killing all 106 passengers and crew on board.
- 15 March 1974 – A Sterling Airways Caravelle 10B3 experienced a landing gear failure as it was taxiing for take-off at Tehran's Mehrabad International Airport leading to 15 passengers being killed and 37 passengers and crew injured.
- 12 October 1976 – Indian Airlines Flight 171, a Caravelle VI-N, crashed at Santacruz Airport following a loss of control caused by an uncontained engine failure and in-flight fire, killing all 95 on board.
- 18 December 1977 – SA de Transport Aérien Flight 730 crashed into the sea while on final approach to Madeira Airport due to pilot error, killing 36 of 52 on board; the wreckage was found in 2011.
- 30 September 1978 – A Finnair Caravelle was hijacked by an unemployed home building contractor carrying a gun. With 44 passengers and 5 crew on board the aircraft flew to Amsterdam, Netherlands. After that it flew to Helsinki, where the hijacker released his hostages and received his demanded money. It then flew to Oulu, where he was arrested at his house the following day.
- 19 June 1980 - An Airborne Express Caravelle VI-R registered as N905MW crashed at Atlanta Hartsfield Airport on approach to runway 26. The probable cause was listed as a poorly planned approach, vortex turbulence, and failure to follow approved procedures, directives, etc.
- 21 December 1980 – A Transportes Aereos del César (Aerocésar) Caravelle VIR (registration HK-1810) crashed near Riohacha, Colombia due to an explosion and in-flight fire, killing all 70 on board. The cause of the explosion was unknown. (1980 Riohacha Transportes Aéreos del Cesar Caravelle crash)
- 29 April 1983, SAN Ecuador Flight 832, a Caravelle VI-R (reg. HC-BAJ, sn. 125) crashed near the southern end of the runway of the Simón Bolívar International Airport in Guayaquil, Ecuador after attempting to execute an emergency landing. The plane had suffered an engine failure shortly after taking off from Guayaquil on a flight to Quito, and the crew was returning to the airport. However, the second engine failed while overflying the city and the plane stalled just as it approached the airport. Cap. Germán Cruz crash-landed the plane in a muddy puddle, produced by recent El Niño rains, near the end of the runway, with the fuselage breaking in three parts but without causing a fire. The accident killed 8 of the 100 people on board and injured several others, but the fact that the puddle acted as a form of cushion to the plane helped avoid more fatalities. The pilot had previously reported engine issues and had tested the plane the previous day, after which it was subjected to maintenance and was later reported as fit to fly shortly before the ill-fated flight.
- 2 July 1983 - An Altair Caravelle III registered as F-BHRS experienced an uncontained engine failure while accelerating for takeoff at Milan Malpensa Airport, Italy. Takeoff was quickly aborted and all 89 occupants survived but the aircraft was damaged beyond repair. The derelict aircraft remained at Milan Malpensa Airport for years afterward.
- 18 January 1986 – An Aerovias Caravelle temporarily leased from Ecuador's SAETA crashed in the jungle after missing its first approach, killing all 93 occupants. The flight had originated in Guatemala City and was to land at Mundo Maya International Airport in the northern department of Petén.

== Aircraft on display ==
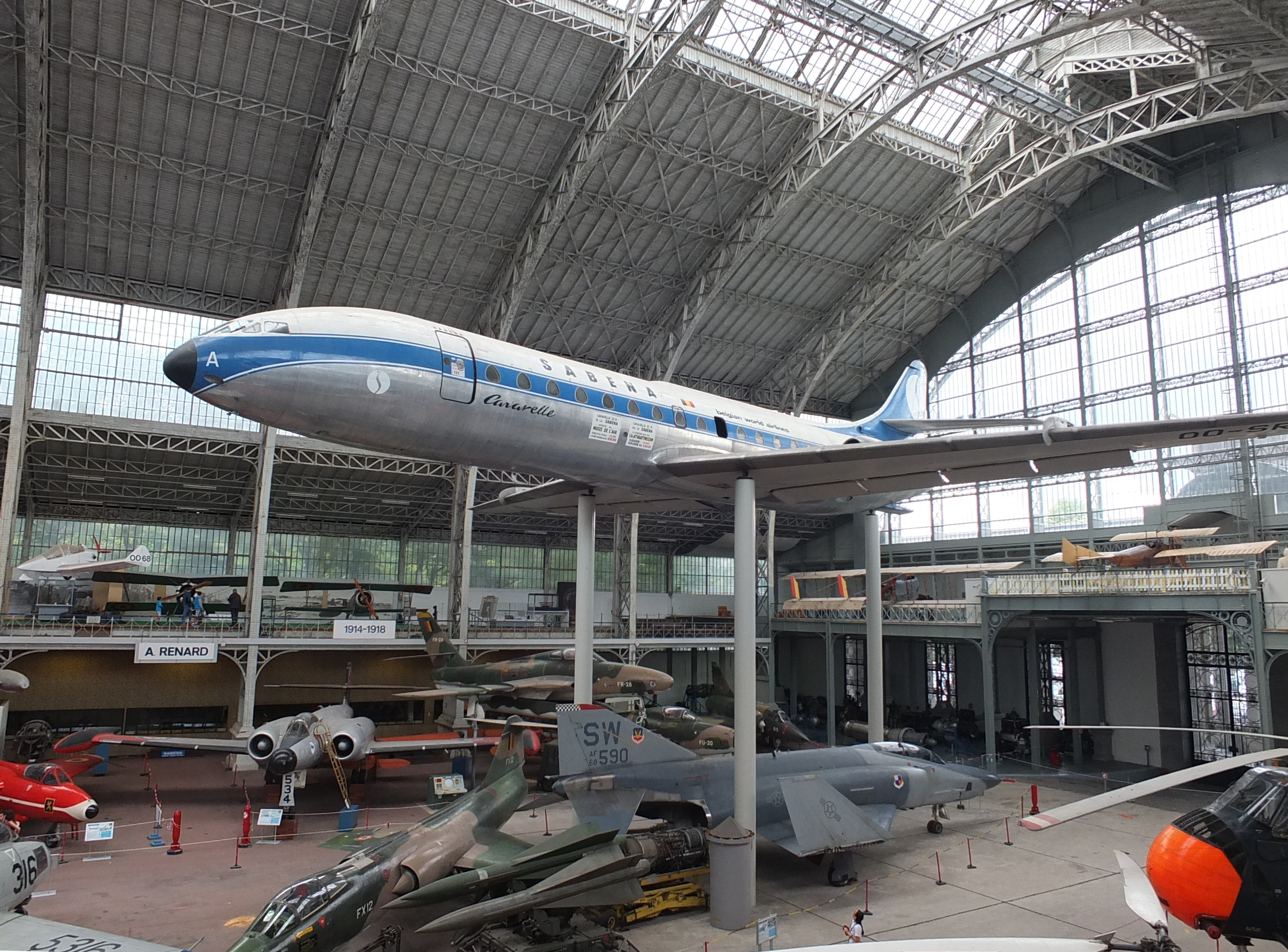
OO-SRA at Royal Museum of the Armed Forces and Military History in Brussels

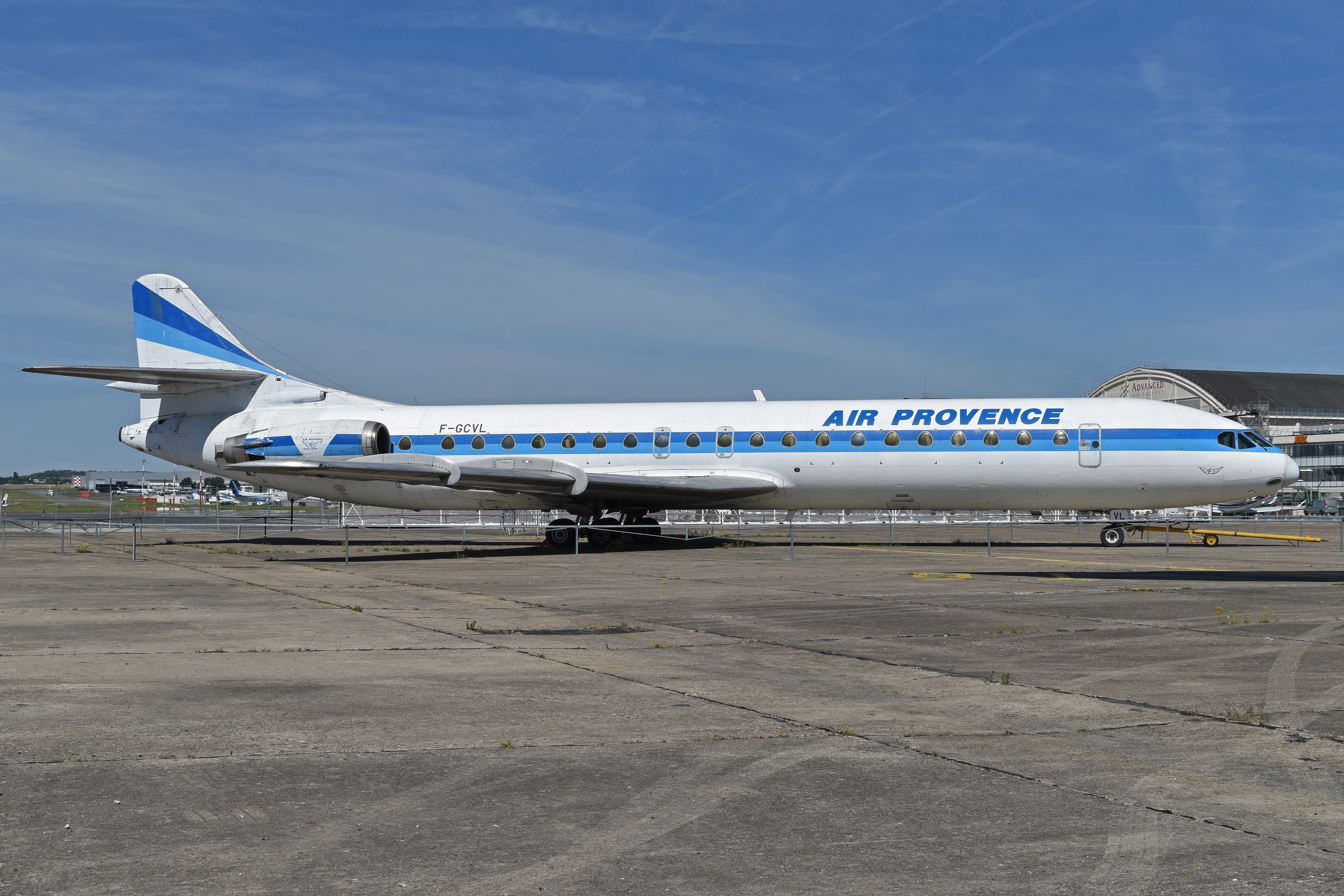
F-GCVL Caravelle 12 at Musée de l'Air et de l'Espace, Paris, France

Europe

- F-BHRA Caravelle III (msn. 1) originally delivered to Air France as Alsace. Preserved at the Piet Smedts Autobedrijf in Baarlo, Netherlands.
- F-BHHH Caravelle I (msn. 1), the first prototype which completed its maiden flight in 1955. It was on display inside Paris Orly Airport, France, in both Air France and Air Inter (It also briefly wore the Aéroport de Paris livery) liveries before becoming severely deteriorated due to a lack of outdoor maintenance, and was eventually scrapped at the airport in October 1986.
- F-BHHI Caravelle III (msn. 2) second prototype – briefly appeared in Air France color scheme but never flew with the airline. Forward fuselage preserved at the Musée de l'Air et de l'Espace in Paris.
- LN-KLH Caravelle III (msn. 3) originally delivered to SAS as Finn Viking. Preserved at the Norwegian Museum of Science and Technology, Oslo, Norway.
- SE-DAA Caravelle III (msn. 4) originally delivered to SAS as Eskil Viking. The nose section is in poor condition at the Finnish Aviation Museum, Helsinki.
- PH-TRO Caravelle III (msn. 33) originally delivered to Transavia Holland. Nose section preserved at the Aviodome, Lelystad, Netherlands.
- OY-KRD Caravelle III (msn. 47) originally delivered to SAS as Ulf Viking. Entire aircraft on display at the Danish Museum of Science & Technology, Helsingør, Denmark.
- F-BHRT Caravelle III (msn. 55) originally delivered to Air France as Picardie. Preserved as instructional airframe at Merville–Calonne Airport airfield, France.
- F-BHRU Caravelle III (msn. 58) originally delivered to Air France as Poitou. Its nose section was preserved after retirement and is now on display inside the Bunge Flygmuseum in Gotland, Sweden.
- CN-CCX Caravelle III (msn. 57) originally delivered to Royal Air Maroc. Forward fuselage in use as a training aircraft at the Mohammedia School of Hospitality and Tourism, Mohammedia, Morocco.
- F-BHRY Caravelle III (msn. 61) originally delivered to Air France as Touraine. On display at the Musée de l'Epopée et de l'Aéronautique in Albert, France.
- F-BVPZ Caravelle VI-N (msn. 218) originally delivered to Air Algérie as 7T-VAI. It later served with Europe EAS - Europe Aero Service, Air France, Air Inter, Aerotour, and Corse Air International. The complete airframe is currently maintained by the Athis-Paray Aviation association and is on display at the Musée Delta in Athis-Mons, France.
- OO-SRA Caravelle VI-N (msn. 64) originally delivered to Sabena. Entire aircraft preserved at the Royal Museum of the Armed Forces and Military History, Brussels, Belgium.
- EL-AIW Caravelle VI-N (msn. 106) originally delivered to Alitalia. It was later transferred to Coastal Airways and has been abandoned on the grass area of the northern military apron at Thessaloniki Airport, Greece, since 1983.
- SE-DAF Caravelle III (msn. 112) originally delivered to SAS as Sven Viking. On display at Turku Airport, Finland. Painted in Finnair 1963 livery with registration OH-LEA.
- F-ZACE Caravelle III (msn. 116) originally delivered to Finnair as OH-LED and flown by the French Air Force as 116/CE. On display at Musée Européen de l'Aviation de Chasse, Montélimar, France.
- F-ZACQ Caravelle VI-R (msn. 234) originally delivered to Luxair as LX-LGE. Also flew for SATA as HB-ICP, Catair as F-BRGX, and Air Inter before being acquired by the Centre d'Essais en Vol (CEV) as F-ZACQ, where it was modified in 1989 for parabolic zero-gravity flights on behalf of the CNES. Once displayed at the French Air and Space Museum in Paris, France, it was later moved to It is now on display Bordeaux–Mérignac Airport, France.
- YU-AHB Caravelle VI-N (msn. 135) originally delivered to JAT Yugoslav Airlines as Bled. On display at the Museum of Yugoslav Aviation, near the Nikola Tesla International Airport.
- F-RAFG Caravelle III (msn. 141) originally ordered by Air France and named Principauté de Monaco, but subsequently delivered to the French Air Force under the Groupe de liaisons aériennes ministérielles (GLAM). It was configured as a VIP transport aircraft featuring an eight-seat private salon and office, and served as the presidential aircraft for General Charles de Gaulle, Georges Pompidou, and Valéry Giscard d'Estaing. It is preserved at the Musée de l'Air et de l'Espace in Paris, France, where it is currently undergoing an in-depth structural inspection and restoration project within the museum's restoration bureau.
- I-DABM Caravelle VI-N (msn. 143) originally delivered to Alitalia. It was later transferred to its subsidiary Società Aerea Mediterranea (SAM). Following its retirement, the aircraft was moved to Fontanafredda in Pordenone, where there was an initial plan to convert it into an ice cream parlor. However, this project was ultimately abandoned after failing to obtain a permit from the local health authority (USL). The airframe remains on display on a piece of private grass in the village of Ceolini, Porcia, Italy.
- SE-DAG Caravelle III (msn. 172) originally delivered to SAS as Dag Viking. Currently on display at the Swedish Air Force Museum, Linköping. The aircraft served with the Swedish Air Force (tail number 851) for signal reconnaissance.
- F-BJEN Caravelle 10R Super B (msn. 185) originally delivered to Finnair as OH-LSC Turku. Forward fuselage section preserved Corlier, France, as "Aeroclub du Haut-Bugey".
- SE-DAI Caravelle III (msn. 210) originally delivered to SAS as Alrik Viking. Fully restored in taxiable condition and preserved by Le Caravelle Club at Stockholm Arlanda Airport, Sweden.
- F-BYCY Caravelle VI-N (msn. 233) originally delivered to Air France, later operated by Aerotour and Corse Air International. Preserved at Moyenpal, France and was renovated into a hotel.
- F-BOHA Caravelle III (msn. 242) originally delivered to Air France as Guyane. On display at Avignon – Provence Airport, France.
- F-GHMU Caravelle 10B3 (msn. 249) originally delivered to Sterling Airways as OY-STE before being sold to Air Toulouse International; also flew for Air City as HB-IKD and the government of the Central African Republic as TL-ABB and European Air Service as F-GCJT. Preserved and on display at the Ailes Anciennes de Toulouse Museum at Toulouse-Blagnac, France.
- TC-ABA Caravelle 10B (msn. 253) originally delivered to SA de Transport Aérien as HB-ICN. Sold to Istanbul Airlines, named Mine. Restored and on display at the Istanbul Aviation Museum, Turkey.
- F-GCVJ Caravelle 12 (msn. 275) originally delivered to Sterling Airways as OY-SAE. Also flew for Air Inter before being used as an instructional trainer, and is now on display inside Rennes–Saint-Jacques Airport, France.
- F-GCVL Caravelle 12 (msn. 273) originally delivered to Sterling Airways as OY-SAE and later flown by Air Inter and Air Provence. Preserved and on display at the Musée de l'Air et de l'Espace, Paris.
- F-GCVK Caravelle 12 (msn. 276) originally delivered to Sterling Airways as OY-SAG and flown by Air Inter. In use as instructional airframe in Air Inter colours at Merville–Calonne Airport airfield, France.
- F-GCVM Caravelle 12 (msn. 270) originally delivered to Sterling Airways as OY-SAA. Also flew for Trans-Union Airlines, Air Inter, and Air Provence before being used as a fire fighting training aid, and is now on display inside Merville–Calonne Airport, France.
- F-BTOE Caravelle 12 (msn. 280) originally delivered to Air Inter. Preserved and on display at the Aeroscopia Museum at Toulouse-Blagnac Airport, France.

North America

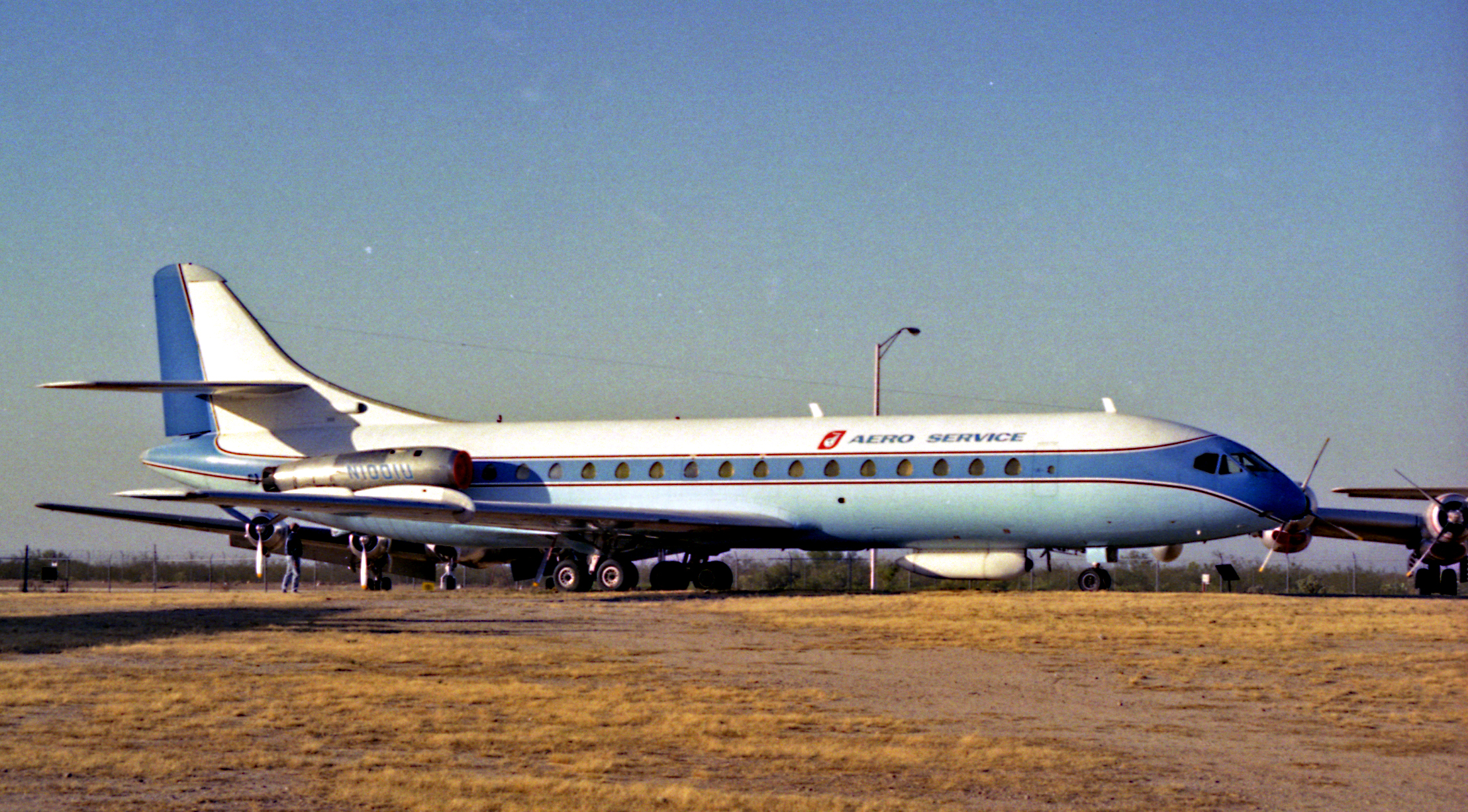
N1001U at the Pima Air & Space Museum in Tucson, Arizona

- N1001U Caravelle VI-R (msn. 86) originally delivered to United Air Lines. Preserved at the Pima Air & Space Museum in Tucson, Arizona, in Aero Service markings.
- HK-2836 Caravelle 10R (msn. 211) originally delivered to Finnair as Kuopio. Also flew for Air Charter and EAS - Europe Aero Service as F-GDFZ before being sold to SEC Colombia as HK-3836 and LAS - Lineas Aereas Suramericanas as HK-3836X, going on to serve with the Mexican Air Force, serial 10506. On display inside Parque Aviacuatico Los Manantiales, Jilotepec–Ixtlahuaca Highway at km 39.
- 10507 Caravelle 10R (msn. 210) originally delivered to Iberia as EC-BIF. Also flew for Aero Lloyd as D-ABAK, Aerosucre, Aerogolfo, and Transaspel. Seized by Mexican authorities during a drug smuggling operation from Colombia in 1995, it was subsequently forfeited to the Mexican Air Force as serial 10507. It is now on display inside Parque Aviacuatico Los Manantiales, Mexico.
- N902MW Caravelle VI-R (msn. 88) originally delivered to United Airlines as N1003U. Also flew for Sterling Airways as OY-SAH before going on to serve with Airborne Express. On display inside the New England Air Museum for decades after its retirement, it was eventually scrapped in 2011 due to severe structural corrosion.
- N901MW Caravelle VI-R (msn. 62) originally delivered to Serviços Aéreos Cruzeiro do Sul. Later flew for Airborne Express. Currently preserved on the apron of John Glenn International Airport in Columbus, Ohio as a firefighting training aid.

Asia

- XU-JTB Caravelle III (msn. 53) originally delivered to Air France as F-BHRI. Also flew for Air Cambodge before being abandoned near the fence of the southern cargo terminal at Don Mueang International Airport, Bangkok, Thailand, since April 1975.

Africa

- I-DABA Caravelle VI-N (msn. 71) originally with Alitalia, before being sold to the Congo as 9Q-CRU. Repainted and on display at the "Aero Beach Craft" park and buffet near Entebbe, Uganda.

== Specifications ==
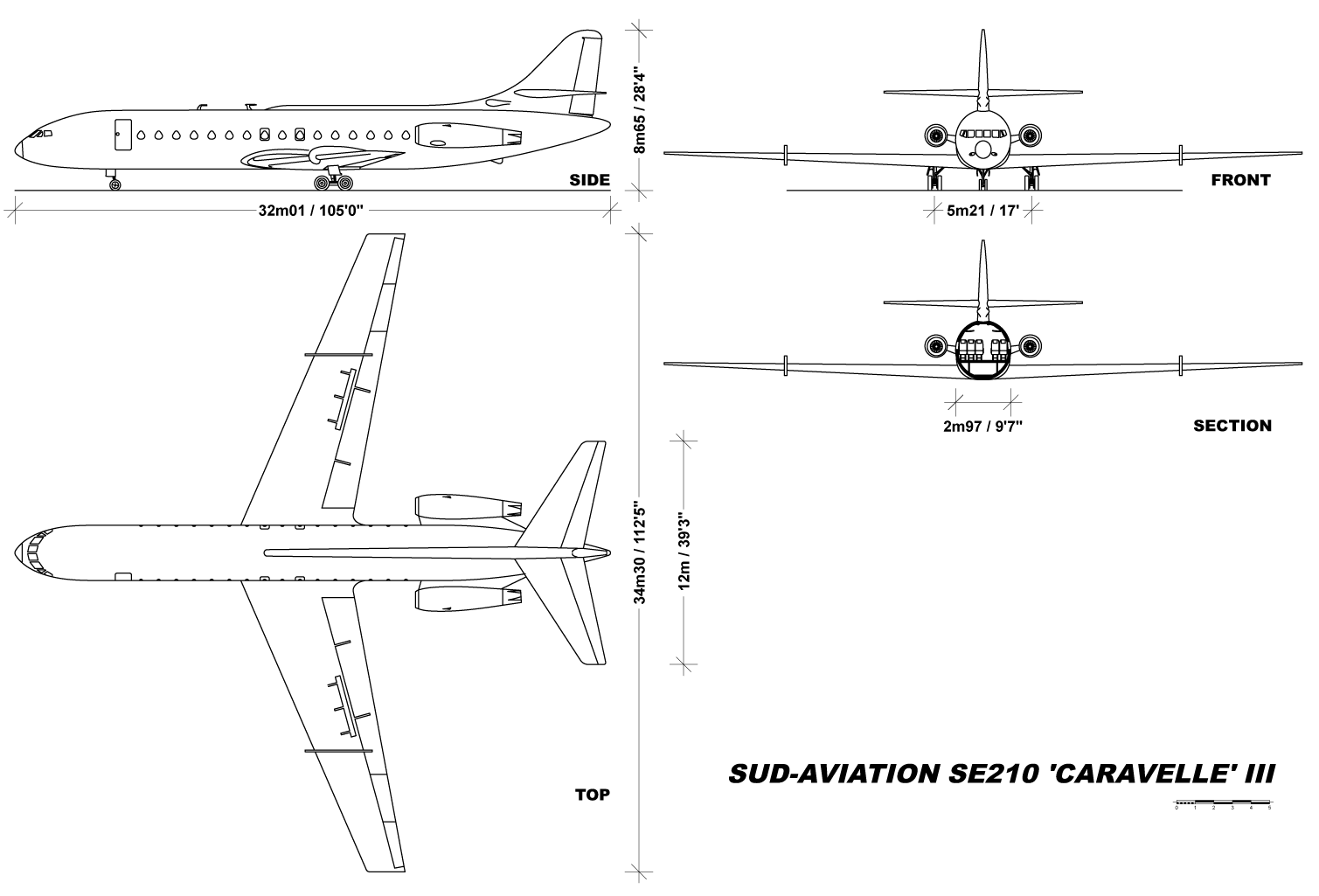
Caravelle I three-view diagram

Specifications
Variant	Caravelle I/III/VI	Caravelle 10/11	Caravelle 12
Flight crew	2 or 3		
Seats	80	80–105	140
Length	32.01 m (105.0 ft)	32.71–33.01 m (107.3–108.3 ft)	36.24 m (118.9 ft)
Span	34.3 m (113 ft)		
Height	8.65 m (28.4 ft)	8.65–9.01 m (28.4–29.6 ft)	8.65 m (28.4 ft)
Cargo	8–10.6 m^{3} (280–370 cu ft)	10.7–12 m^{3} (380–420 cu ft)	16.5 m^{3} (580 cu ft)
Empty	23,290–26,280 kg (51,350–57,940 lb)	27,623–28,840 kg (60,898–63,581 lb)	29,500 kg (65,000 lb)
MTOW	43,500–51,000 kg (95,900–112,400 lb)	54,000–57,000 kg (119,000–126,000 lb)	58,000 kg (128,000 lb)
Engines	Rolls-Royce Avon	Pratt & Whitney JT8D	
Unit Thrust	46.75–56.05 kN (10,510–12,600 lb_{f})	62.27 kN (14,000 lb_{f})	64.50 kN (14,500 lb_{f})
Max cruise	746–845 km/h (464–525 mph; 403–456 kn)	800–824 km/h (497–512 mph; 432–445 kn)	810 km/h (500 mph; 440 kn)
Range	1,650–2,500 km (1,030–1,550 mi; 890–1,350 nmi)	2,800–3,300 km (1,700–2,100 mi; 1,500–1,800 nmi)	3,200 km (2,000 mi; 1,700 nmi)
Ceiling	11,000–12,000 m (36,000–39,000 ft)		

== See also ==
Related development

- Sud Aviation Super-Caravelle

Aircraft of comparable role, configuration, and era

- de Havilland Comet
- BAC One-Eleven
- McDonnell Douglas DC-9
- Boeing 727
- Boeing 737
- Tupolev Tu-104
- Tupolev Tu-124
- Tupolev Tu-134

Related lists

- List of civil aircraft
- List of jet airliners
