= Flight 825 =

Flight 825 may refer to

- China Airlines Flight 825, exploded on 20 November 1971
- Air Rhodesia Flight 825, shot down on 3 September 1978
