= SATA (Swiss airline) =

Swiss airline

S.A. de Transport Aérien
- Founded: June 1966
- Ceased operations: 1978
- Hubs: Geneva Airport
- Headquarters: Geneva, Switzerland
- Key people: Charles Jacquat; Raymond Lambert; Michel Favre

S.A. de Transport Aérien (SATA) — also known as S.A. de Transport Aérien Genève — was a Swiss airline founded in June 1966, with its head office on the property of Geneva Airport, and with its base in Geneva. It started as an air-taxi operator and evolved to passenger and cargo charters to points in Europe, the US, South America and the Caribbean. It terminated its activities in 1978.

== Fleet ==
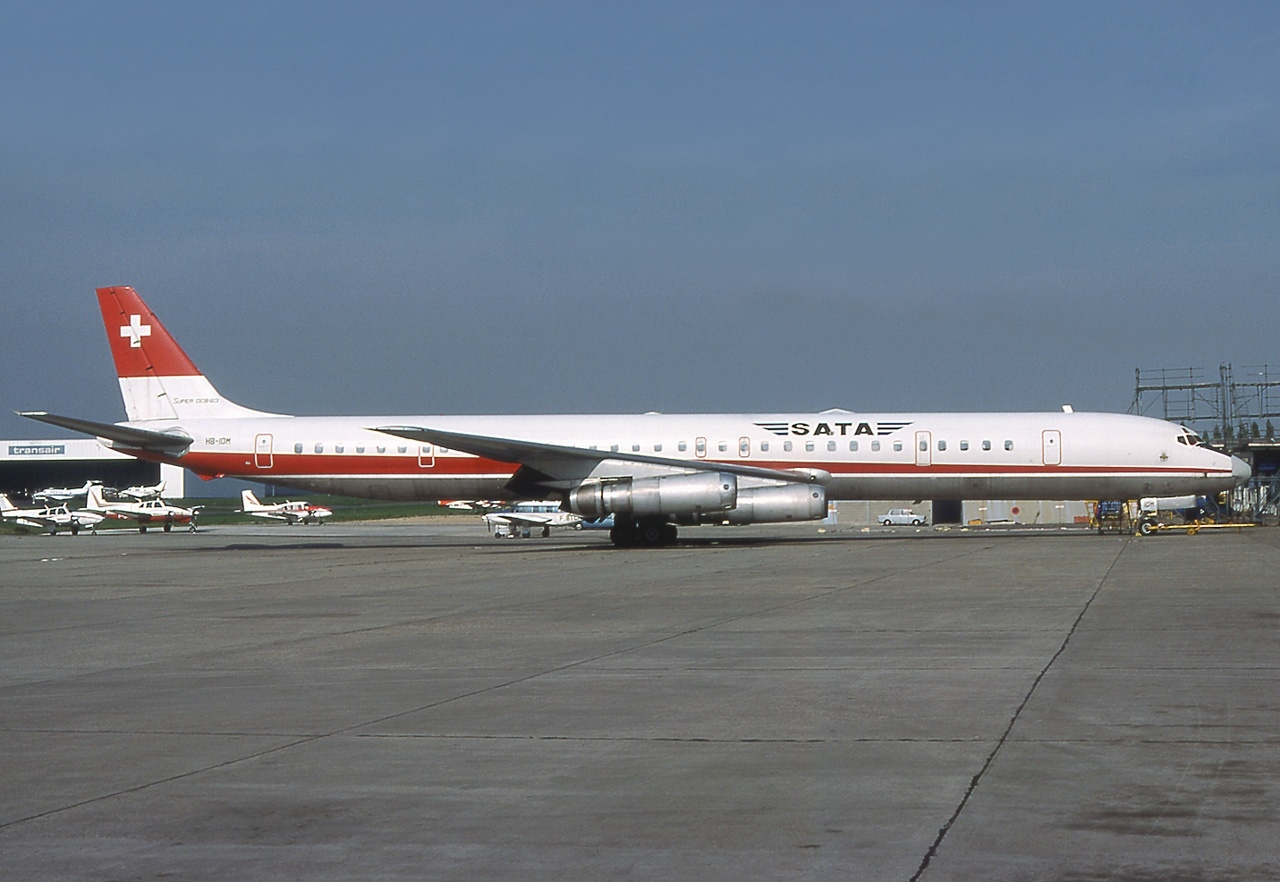
SATA Douglas DC-8

SATA's fleet included these aircraft in 1975

- 1 Cessna 172
- 1 Cessna 401
- 1 Cessna 421
- 1 Pilatus PC-6
- 1 Dassault Falcon 20
- 1 Douglas DC-8
- 5 Sud Aviation Caravelle

== Incidents and accidents ==
SATA had two major incidents with its aircraft:

- On July 17, 1973, while landing at Tromsø/Langnes Airport in Norway, a Convair CV-640 landed heavily, bounced, and landed back nose-down, resting 15m short of the runway end.
- On December 18, 1977, SA de Transport Aérien Flight 730 a Sud Aviation SE-210 Caravelle 10R crashed into the sea while on final approach to Funchal Airport on Madeira, killing 36. There were 21 survivors rescued, including both pilots and 17 passengers.

== Literature ==
- Charles Jacquat: Le goût du risque. Editions A. Barthelemy, Genf 1982.
