= EAS Europe Airlines =

French airline

- EAS logo

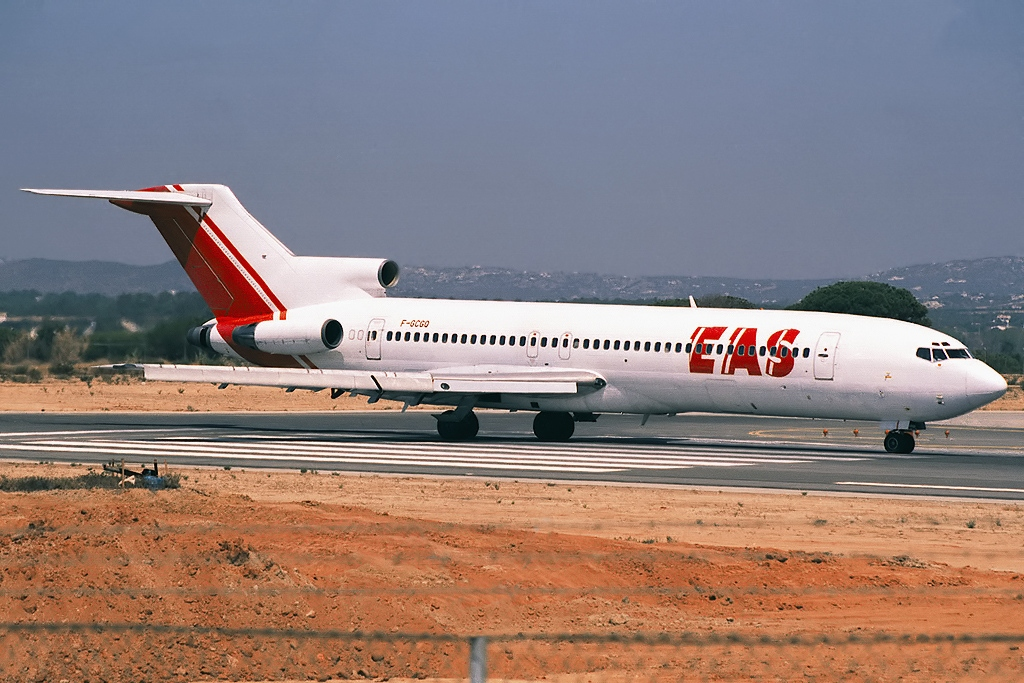
- Boeing 727-200
IATA	ICAO	Call sign
EY	EYT	EURO LINE
- Commenced operations: 1965
- Ceased operations: 1995
- Fleet size: See Historic fleet details below
- Destinations: Perpignan–Rivesaltes Airport, Paris, Metz
- Parent company: Societé Aero Sahara

EAS Europe Airlines was a French airline that operated from 1965 until 1995.

== Company history ==
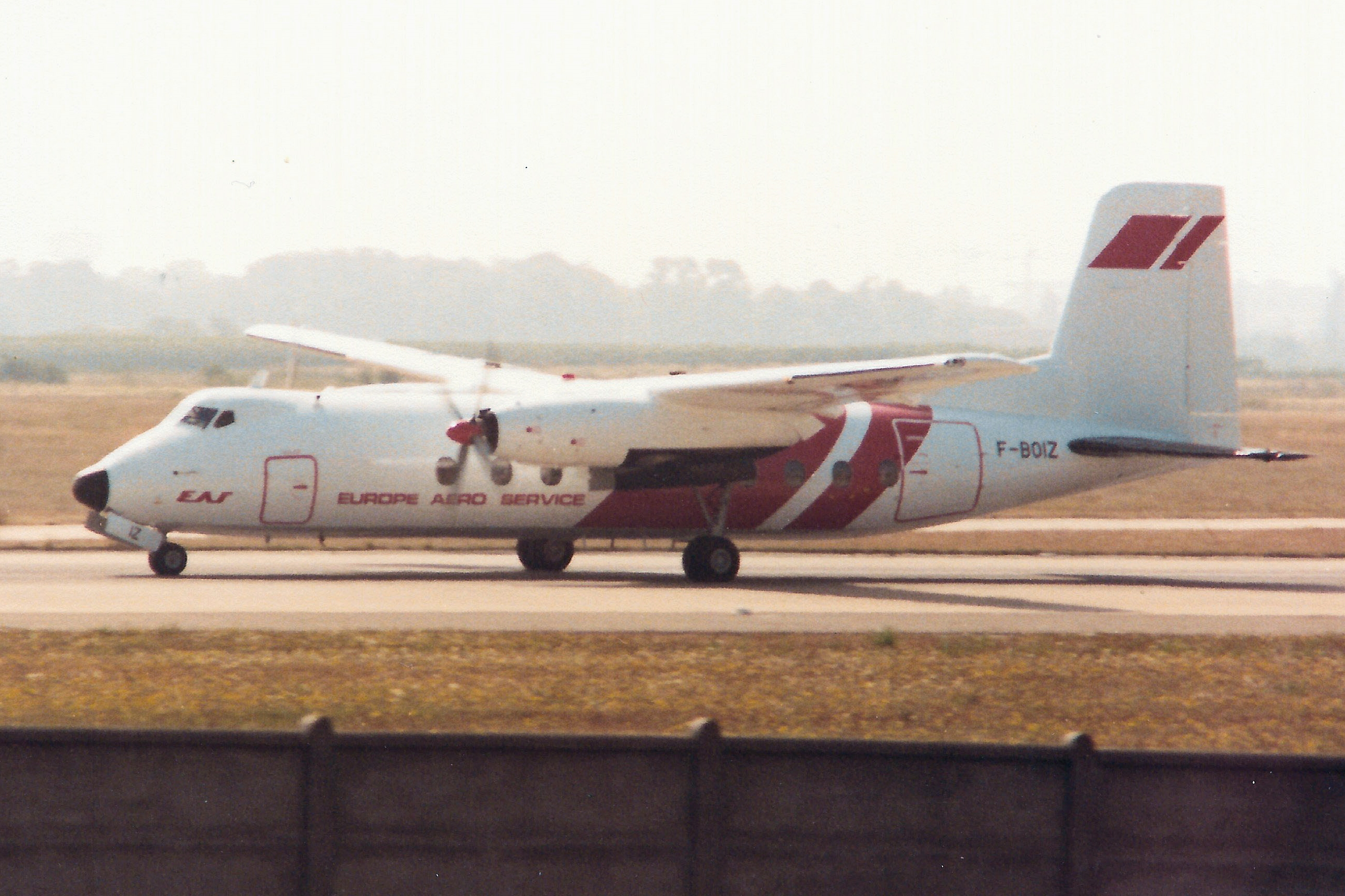
Handley Page Dart Herald

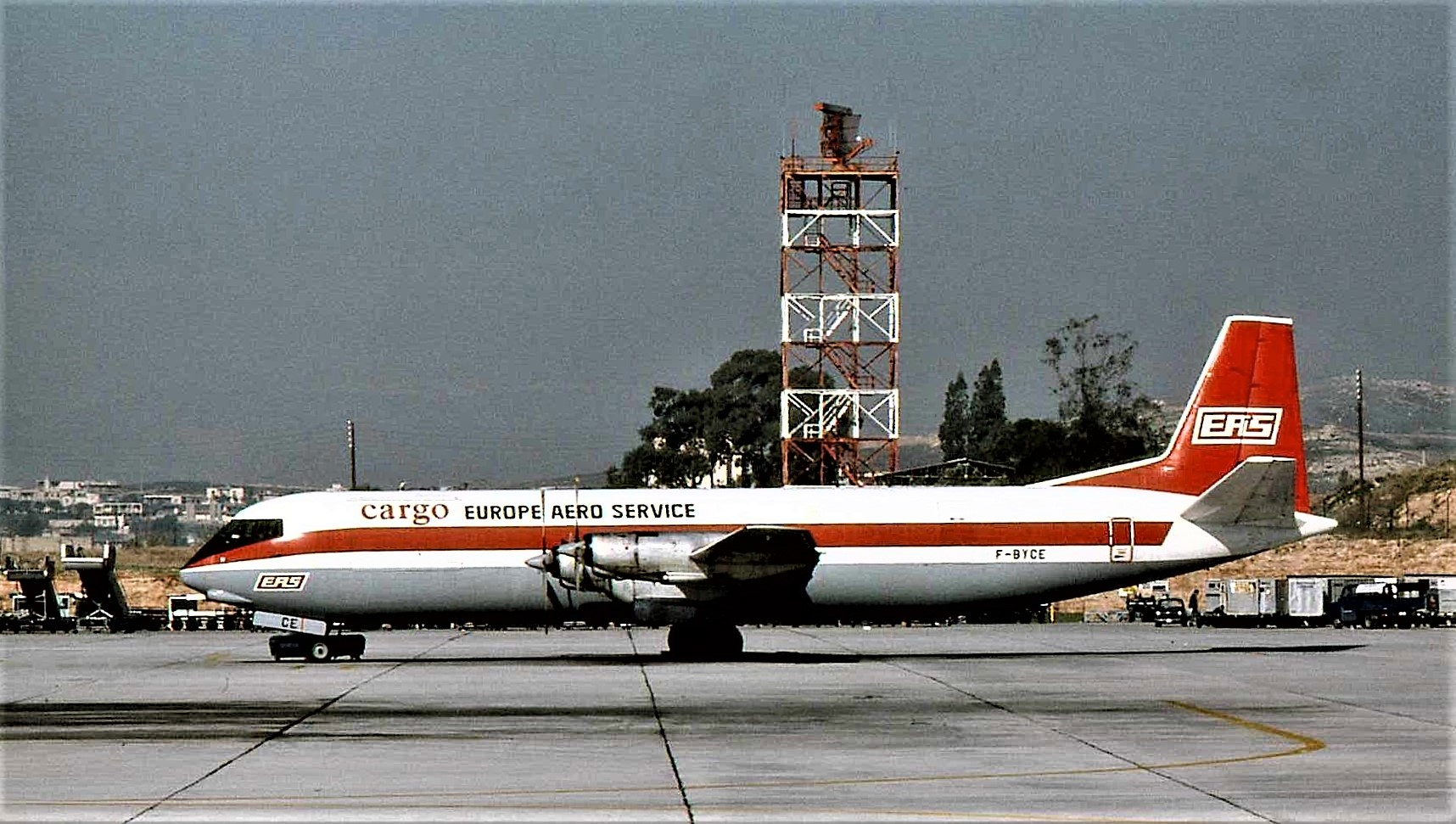
A Vickers Vanguard at Athens Airport in 1978

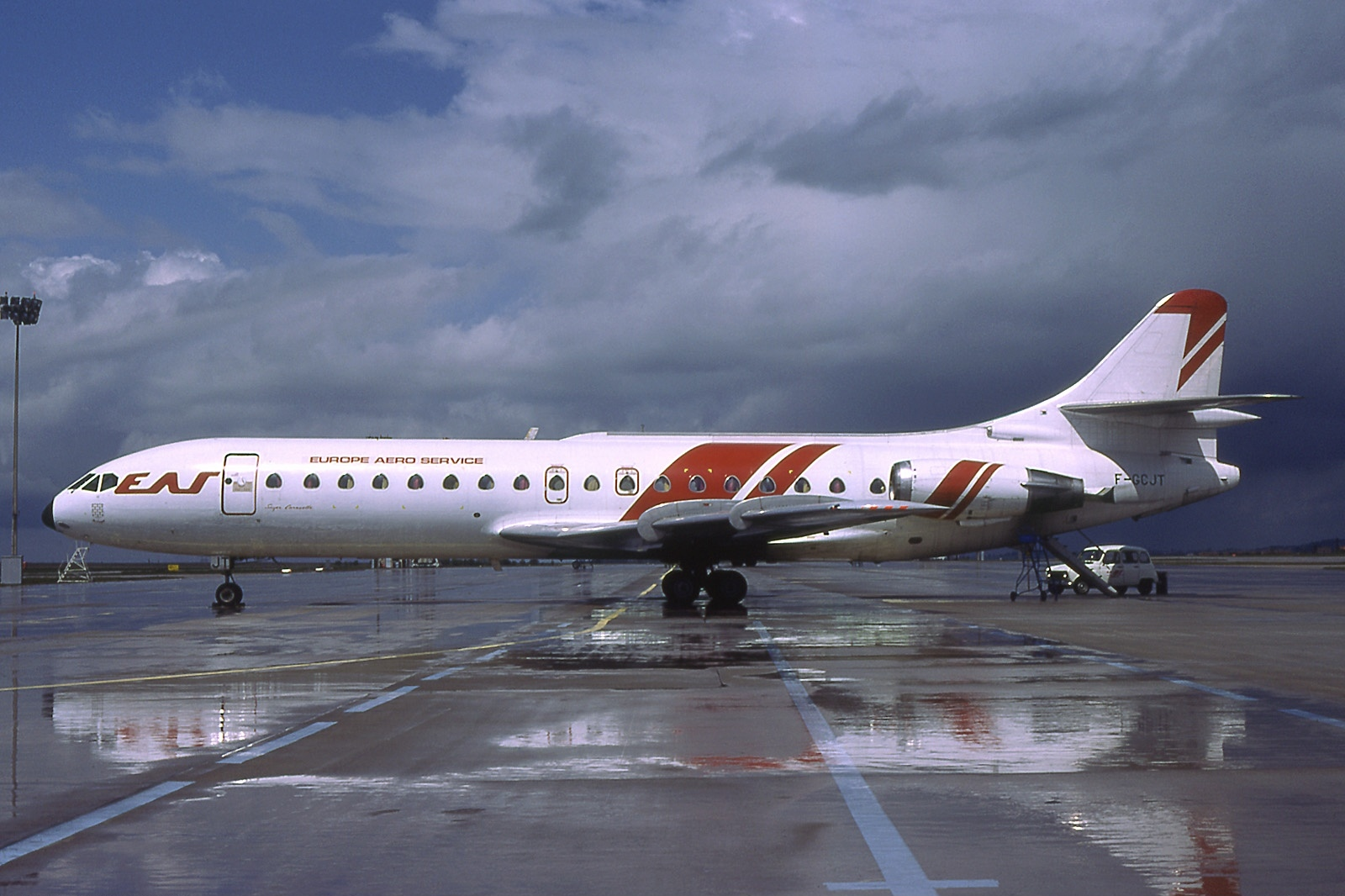
SE 210 Caravelle

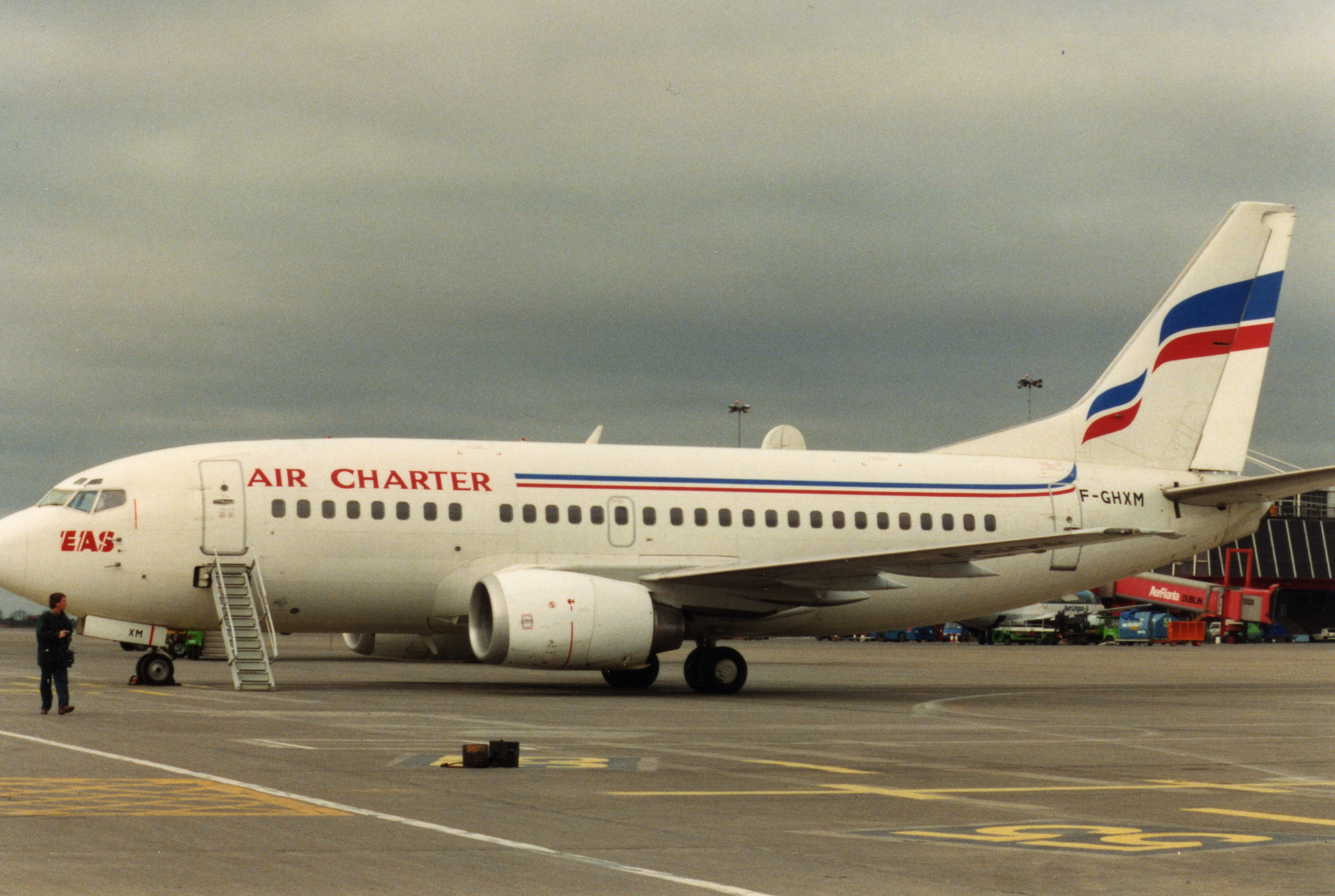
A Boeing 737-500 in EAS/ Air Charter hybrid livery at Dublin Airport in 1993

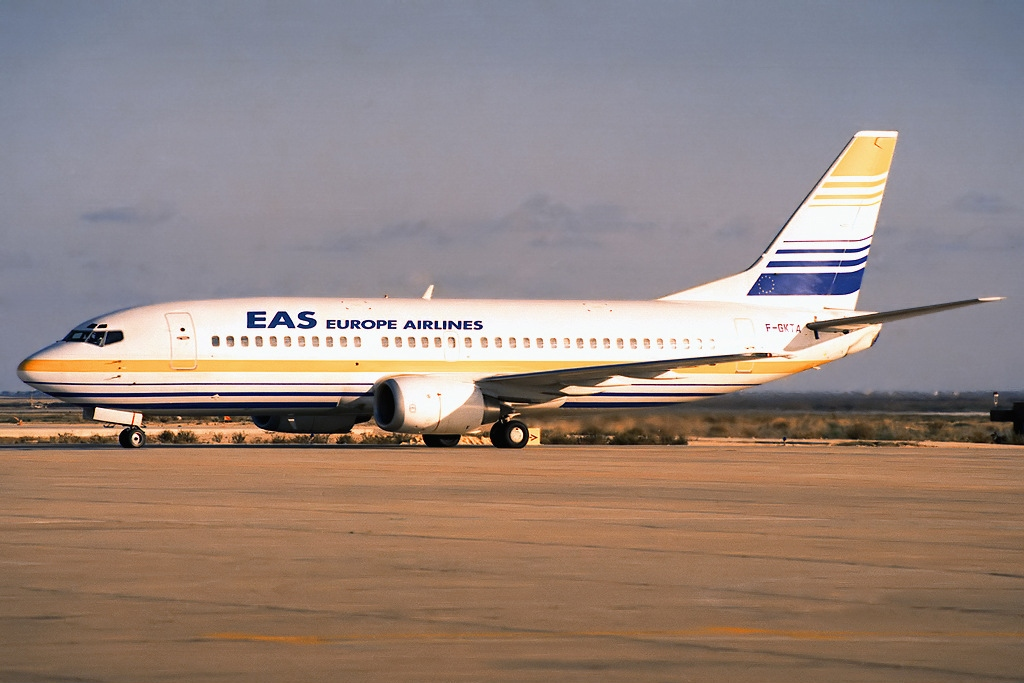
Boeing 737-222 in basic Air Toulouse International colours

Europe Aéro Service was established in July 1965 as the France-based branch of Societé Aero Sahara from Algeria. Charter flights were started immediately and in 1966 launched schedules between Perpignan and Palma de Majorca with several aircraft types, including Handley Page Dart Herald. Other services were between Valence – Paris; Metz – Paris and Paris – Rennes. In 1971 EAS was operating night freight flights for Air France mostly flying newspapers from Paris to Marseille, Toulouse, Algiers, Casablanca, Frankfurt, Milan, Tunis and Zurich. Another aircraft used in the 1970s was the Vickers Vanguard freighter and, from 1972, the SE 210 Caravelle or passenger flights.

All schedules were halted in late 1970s and EAS devoted itself to charter business and ACMI operations. Aircraft used for such operations were the Boeing 737-222 and the Boeing 707-436. The airline also had a small fleet of small aircraft devoted to small parcels flights.

At the beginning of 1990s, EAS began having financial problems and declared bankruptcy. In accordance with the December 27, 1991 decision of the Perpignan Tribunal Commercial Court, Société Nouvelle Europe Aero Service (SNEAS) became the managing tenant for a period of 13 months, of Europe Aero Service now owned by the financier Francis Lagarde. In 1993, under the leadership of Lagarde, EAS became EAS Europe Airlines. At the same time, he also created EAS Cargo with a C-130 Hercules aircraft.

After all that, Francis Lagarde tried to relauch the small Air Toulouse (controlled by his financial company) by stripping EAS Europe Airlines bare. The end could not be averted: on March 6, 1995, the airline ceased all flight operations and concentrated itself in the maintenance of all types of aircraft.

== Fleet details ==
The following aircraft types were operated by EAS:

- Boeing 707-436
- Boeing 727-200
- Boeing 737-222
- Handley Page Dart Herald
- Nord 262
- SE 210 Caravelle
- Vickers Vanguard
- Vickers Viking
