= SA de Transport Aérien Flight 730 =

1977 aviation accident

Coordinates: 32°41′52″N 16°46′28″W

SA de Transport Aérien (SATA) Flight 730
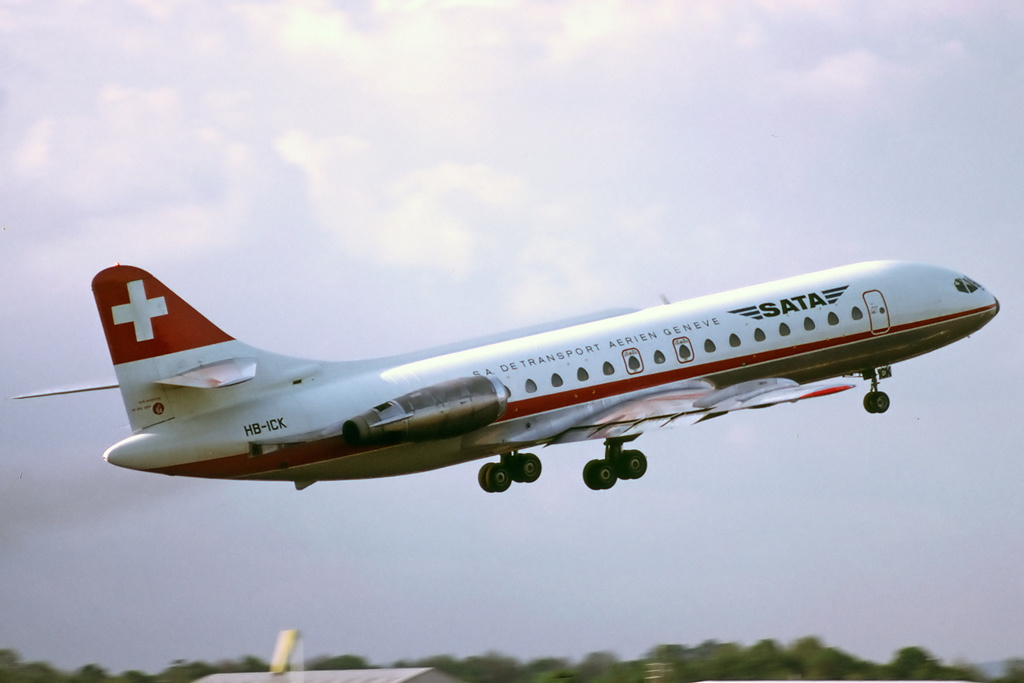
- HB-ICK, the Caravelle involved, seen in June 1974

Accident
- Date: 18 December 1977
- Summary: Controlled flight into terrain due to pilot error
- Site: Funchal, Portugal

Aircraft
- Aircraft type: Sud Aviation SE-210 Caravelle 10R
- Operator: SA de Transport Aérien (SATA)
- Registration: HB-ICK
- Flight origin: Geneva Airport, Switzerland
- Destination: Madeira Airport, Portugal
- Occupants: 57
- Passengers: 52
- Crew: 5
- Fatalities: 36
- Survivors: 21

SA de Transport Aérien Flight 730 was a Sud Aviation SE-210 Caravelle 10R aircraft, registered as HB-ICK, that crashed on approach to Funchal Airport, Madeira, on December 18, 1977.

== Background ==
The flight crew consisted of two captains. The pilot in command had never previously landed at Funchal and was being trained to operate from the notoriously difficult airport by the other, more experienced captain, who was acting as co-pilot. The training was intended to take place during daytime, but due to a delay the aircraft reached its destination after dark.

== Accident ==
The non-scheduled flight departed from Zurich, making its first stop at Geneva Cointrin International Airport at 14:30 UTC. While at Geneva, the aircraft's departure to Funchal was delayed due to a hydraulic pump failure, and it finally took off at 16:26.

At 19:38, the crew contacted Madeira control tower when they were at the ROSE reporting point at 33,000 feet (10,000 m), and were cleared to descend to 5,000 ft (1,500 m). At 19:55, the crew reported overflying Porto Santo island at 8,500 ft (2,600 m) and were instructed to continue their descent to 5000 ft and then to contact Funchal approach control.

At 19:57, Funchal cleared the crew to descend to 3,500 ft (1,100 m) and informed them that the QNH was 1014.0 hpa. The crew state their intention to carry out an instrument approach for training purposes, and shortly after 20:11 they confirm they have sight of the runway. After being cleared for the approach, the crew descended below the 720 ft (220 m) permitted during circling, even though they had lost sight of the runway. The aircraft had its landing gear down and the flaps were extended to 20 degrees when it crashed into the water.

Thirty-five passengers and one hostess lost their lives, many becoming trapped inside the sinking fuselage. The remaining passengers and crew, including both pilots, were rescued by local fisherman and rescue teams, or swam to the nearby shore.

== Cause ==
The cause of the accident was attributed to pilot error, due to lack of coordination between the pilots, and to sensorial illusion. It was the second fatal air crash in a month at Funchal. On November 19, TAP Portugal Flight 425 had crashed at the airport, killing 131 people.

== Wreckage discovery ==
In October 2011 the wreckage of the Caravelle was found by a team of Portuguese divers at a depth of 110 m (360 ft). The aircraft had reportedly broken into two sections.
