= 1970 Berrechid Royal Air Maroc Caravelle crash =

Crash of a Royal Air Maroc jetliner

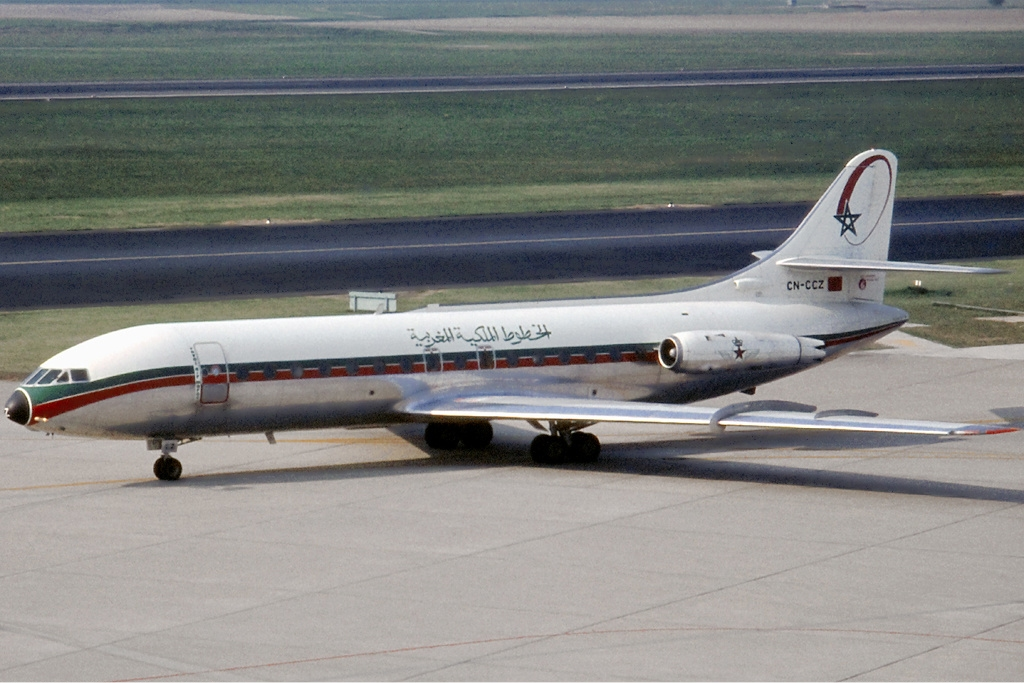
- Similar aircraft as the crashed airplane

Accident
- Date: April 1, 1970
- Summary: Crash resulting from avoiding the town of Berrechid, Morocco.
- Site: Berrechid, Morocco

Aircraft
- Aircraft type: Sud Aviation SE-210 Caravelle III
- Operator: Royal Air Maroc - RAM
- Registration: CN-CCV
- Flight origin: Agadir, Morocco
- Stopover: Casablanca, Morocco
- Destination: Paris, France
- Passengers: 76
- Crew: 6
- Fatalities: 61—65
- Survivors: 17–21

The 1970 Berrechid crash was an aviation incident involving a Sud Aviation SE-210 Caravelle III on a route between Agadir and Paris, with a stopover in Casablanca.

During the descent, the airplane lost altitude near Berrechid, a city around 30 kilometers from the intermediate stop Casablanca.

The crash resulted in 61 fatalities, with 21 survivors, six of whom were in critical condition. It was reported that four more people died later in hospital.

== Crash ==
The crash was reported to have been a result of the plane dodging to avoid the town of Berrechid, Morocco. There is contention as to whether the aircraft hit high-voltage wires before crashing. The aircraft crashed on El Gara road, and spread debris over a 1,000 square yards (840 m^{2}) area. The pilot attempted to land in a field, and a 50 metres (55 yd) long furrow was created in the field. The crash site was near a narrow road.

61 people were killed directly after the crash. Four other people died later in the hospital of Casablanca. Several other survivors were in critical condition. Most of the people on board were French and Moroccan citizens.

== Aftermath ==
The aircraft was damaged beyond repair, and the fuselage broke in two just behind the wings. The front part of the aircraft was severely burned, while the tail damage was less severe.

== Aircraft ==
At the time of the crash, the aircraft was a 9-year and 11 month old Sud Aviation SE-210 Caravelle registered under CN-CCV.
