= Pushpaka Aviation =

Pushpaka Aviation Pvt. Ltd. was an air charter company based in Mumbai, India. It operated fleet of helicopters from its base at Juhu Aerodrome in Mumbai. It is involved primarily in crop dusting, aerial seeding, and fleet maintenance in addition to its chartered passenger operations. As of July 2022, Pushpaka Aviation is non-operational.

== History ==
The company was started in 1969 (57 years ago) by Mr. H.P. Rao, with three Bell 47G-5 helicopters to undertake agricultural crop spraying in India, whilst taking advantage of the subsidies offered to the farming community by the Government. It was the first private company in India to start scheduled international passenger flights as an associate of the national carrier Air India from 1979 to 1983.

== Pushpaka Airlines ==
Pushpaka Airlines, the airline division of Pushpak Aviation, began providing passenger and freight charter services from Mumbai to the Persian Gulf. It operated as an associate of the National carrier Air India using two Sud Aviation Caravelle-6N aircraft, purchased from Indian Airlines in 1978. Operations began initially as cargo services between Sharjah and Mumbai and were later expanded to carry passengers as well. The airline ceased functioning in June 1983 (43 years ago).
