= 1980 Riohacha TAC Caravelle crash =

December 1980 plane crash near Riohacha, Colombia

1980 Riohacha Transportes Aéreos del Cesar Caravelle crash
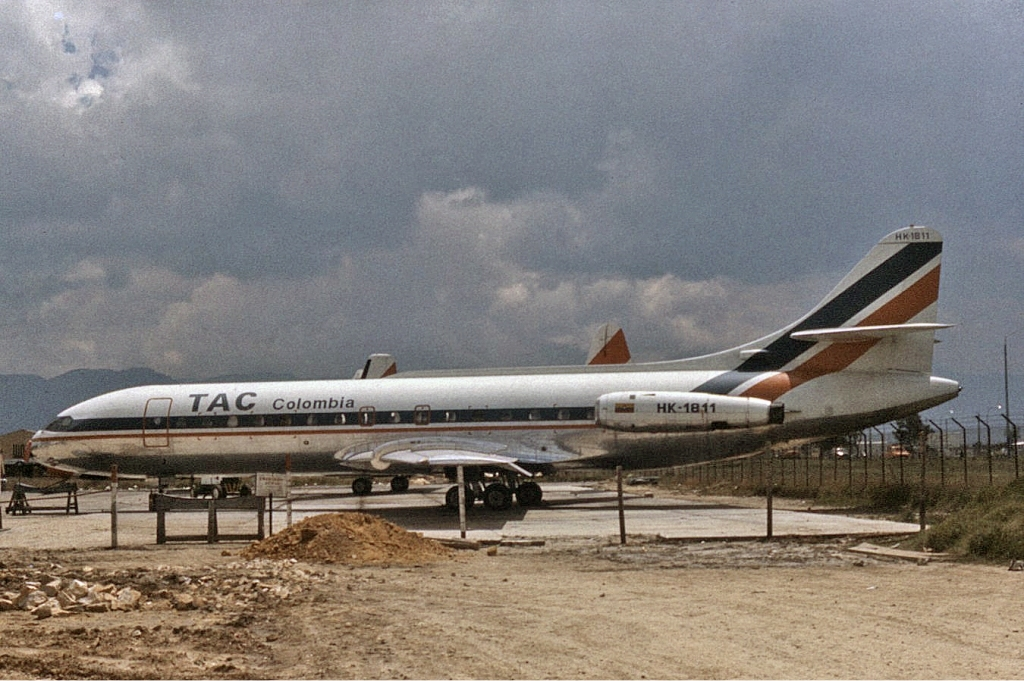
- A TAC Sud Aviation Caravelle similar to the aircraft involved in the crash

Accident
- Date: December 21, 1980
- Summary: Loss of control due to in-flight explosion of undetermined origin
- Site: near Riohacha, La Guajira, Caribbean region, Colombia 11°32′39″N 72°54′25″W

Aircraft
- Aircraft type: Sud Aviation SE-210 Caravelle VI-R
- Operator: Transportes Aéreos del Cesar
- Registration: HK-1810
- Flight origin: El Dorado International Airport, Bogotá
- 1st stopover: Ernesto Cortissoz International Airport, Barranquilla
- 2nd stopover: Alfonso López Pumarejo Airport, Valledupar
- 3rd stopover: Almirante Padilla Airport, Riohacha
- Last stopover: Olaya Herrera Airport, Medellín
- Destination: El Dorado International Airport, Bogotá
- Occupants: 70
- Passengers: 63
- Crew: 7
- Fatalities: 70
- Survivors: 0

The 1980 Riohacha Transportes Aéreos del Cesar Caravelle crash was a Colombian domestic flight that crashed on December 21, 1980. The flight, operating a Bogotá-Barranquilla-Valledupar-Riohacha-Medellín-Bogotá route, crashed at 2:23 p.m. local time, ten minutes after takeoff from Riohacha. All 70 occupants on board were killed, making the crash the deadliest in Colombia at the time, and the eighth-deadliest in Colombia today.

== Background ==
=== Aircraft ===
The aircraft involved in the accident was a Sud Aviation SE-210 Caravelle VI-R, registered as HK-1810. It was manufactured in April 1963 and was 17 years old at the time of the accident. It had been acquired by TAC three years before the crash.

=== Recent maintenance ===
Prior to the accident flight, the plane involved, HK-1810, had been undergoing maintenance work for the past two months. It was re-authorized for domestic operation before the accident, but because of the high demand of the Christmas season, some suspect that the plane was rushed into service before all maintenance was properly finished.

== Accident ==
The flight took off from Bogotá and landed in Barranquilla at 11:47 a.m. on the morning of December 21, 1980. It departed Barranquilla at 12:00 p.m. and landed in Valledupar, then departing for Riohacha at 1:35 p.m. The plane took off on the accident leg at 2:15 p.m. for Medellín, and at 2:23 p.m., the explosion and subsequent crash occurred.

Sources in Barranquilla said that pilot Jorge Jimenez reported technical problems prior to the explosion. The pilots intended on making an emergency landing, but the damage from explosion prevented them from doing so.

Some Arhuaco indigenous peoples arrived in Riohacha sometime after the crash and reported having seen a plane engulfed in flames.

Several rescue patrols headed towards the site, but suspended operations at 6:54 p.m. on the evening of the crash. Aerial surveys of the area reported complete devastation, sighting clothes in trees and smoking remains of the plane scattered across a large area.

The crash was deemed unsurvivable.

== Possible causes ==
The cause of the crash was an explosion which led to loss of control. The cause of the explosion itself, however, remains undetermined. According to taxi driver César Rafael Díaz, who gave a bottle of whiskey to the captain Jorge Jimenez before the flight noted that when the plane was on the tarmac, an oil leak was spotted in the right turbine. This leak was noticed by the mechanic, but he determined it was of no danger. There was also a shipment of Japanese gunpowder on board which may have ignited

== Initial thoughts on victims ==
It was thought at first that musicians from the group "Los Hermanos Monroy," who had performed in Maicao the night before, had been on board. It was later confirmed that they were not.

== See also ==
- List of accidents and incidents involving commercial aircraft
