= China Airlines Flight 825 =

1971 airliner bombing

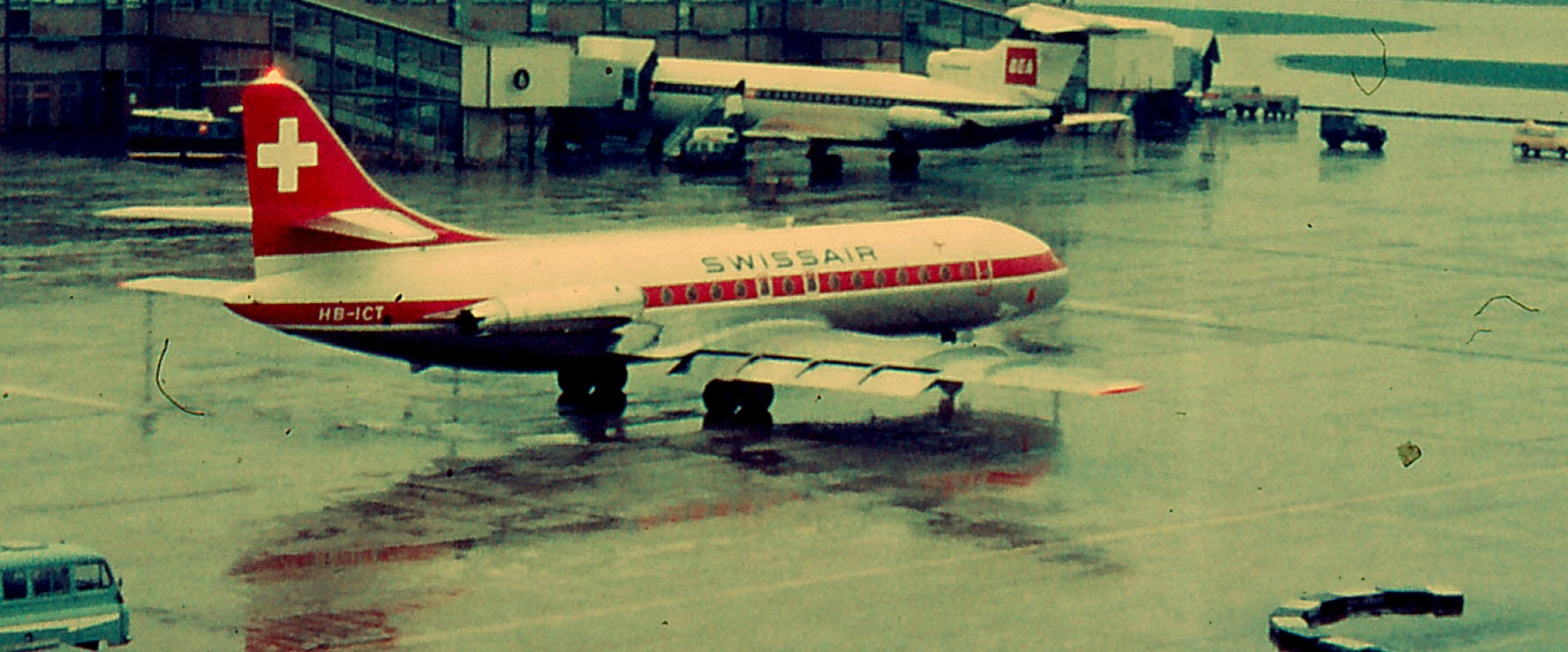
- The aircraft involved while still in service with Swissair in 1969

Summary
- Date: 20 November 1971
- Summary: In-flight explosion caused by bombing
- Site: South China Sea, Penghu, Taiwan; 23°32′40.3″N 119°23′08.2″E

Aircraft
- Aircraft type: Sud Aviation SE-210 Caravelle III
- Operator: China Airlines
- IATA flight No.: CI825
- ICAO flight No.: CAL825
- Call sign: DYNASTY 825
- Registration: B-1852
- Flight origin: Songshan Airport, Taipei, Taiwan
- Destination: Kai Tak Airport, Hong Kong
- Occupants: 25
- Passengers: 17
- Crew: 8
- Fatalities: 25
- Survivors: 0

China Airlines Flight 825 was a scheduled China Airlines passenger flight from Taipei's Songshan Airport to Kai Tak Airport, Hong Kong. On 20 November 1971, the Sud Aviation SE-210 operating this route disintegrated in midair over the Penghu islands, killing all 25 on board.

== Aircraft ==
The aircraft involved was a Sud Aviation SE-210 Caravelle III built in March 1962, first delivered to Swissair registered as HB-ICT. The aircraft was involved in a separate accident as Swissair Flight 142, on 25 April 1962, where it experienced problems with its nose landing gear en route from Geneva, Switzerland to Paris, France. Due to unsatisfactory maintenance and a lack of fuel, the flight was diverted by air traffic control (ATC) to Zurich Airport. The aircraft then landed at Zurich with the nose gear retracted, causing a fire to break out underneath the cockpit. All 72 people on board were evacuated safely. The aircraft was repaired and returned to service. On 12 January 1971, the aircraft was delivered to China Airlines.

== Events ==
On 20 November 1971, prior to the incident, the aircraft landed safely at Taipei as Flight 823 from Osaka, Japan via Naha and completed this flight without incident.

The aircraft then departed Taipei as China Airlines Flight 825 at 21:02 local time and was expected to arrive at Kai Tak Airport at 22:50. The captain was Wei Pu-hsiao and the first officer was Chü Chi-ping. There were 10 passengers on board other than the Taiwanese passengers: 3 Japanese, 3 Iranians, 2 Singaporeans, 1 Vietnamese, and 1 Brazilian, Lauro Muller Neto, Brazil's ambassador to Taiwan at the time.

Flight 825's last communication with ATC was made at 21:33 while at 26,000 feet (7,900 m) and contact was lost 17 minutes later at 21:50. The aircraft crashed into the Taiwan Strait, killing all 17 passengers and 8 crew members on board.

The Taiwan Garrison Command investigated the crash, which concluded that the in-flight break up was the result of a terrorist bomb explosion. The reasons for the bombing could not be determined.

Nationality	Passengers	Crew	Total
Taiwan	7	8	15
Japan	3	-	3
Iran	3	-	3
Singapore	2	-	2
South Vietnam	1	-	1
Brazil	1	-	1
Total	17	8	25
