= Merville–Calonne Airport =

Merville - Calonne Airport Advanced Landing Ground (ALG) B-53
- IATA: HZB; ICAO: LFQT

Summary
- Airport type: Public
- Serves: Merville, Nord, France
- Location: Calonne-sur-la-Lys
- Elevation AMSL: 61 ft / 19 m
- Coordinates: 50°37′00″N 002°38′24″E

Map
- Location of airport in France

Runways
Direction	Length		Surface
Direction	m	ft	Surface
04/22	1,840	6,037	Asphalt
04R/22L	1,000	3,281	Grass
- Sources: French AIP, UAF

Merville – Calonne Airport (IATA: HZB, ICAO: LFQT) is a regional airport in France. It is located 3 km (2 miles) south of Merville, in northern France. The airport supports general aviation with no commercial airline service scheduled.

== History ==
The airport was originally built by Nazi Germany after the occupation of France in 1940 as a Luftwaffe base (Fliegerhorst Merville), as part of the defences of the Pas de Calais area. After the area was liberated in 1944 it was converted by United States Army Air Forces engineers into an allied airfield. The airport was used by the Royal Air Force as Advanced Landing Ground B-53 Merville.

The airfield has numerous wartime relics, including many bunkers.

== Facilities ==
The airport has air traffic control services and two runways oriented north-south (04/22):

- A paved runway of 1,840 by 30 metres (6,037 ft × 98 ft)
- A 1,000 by 80 metres (3,281 ft × 262 ft) grass runway.

There is a small (195 square metres (2,099 sq ft)) terminal building and a restaurant.
