= 1977 in aviation =

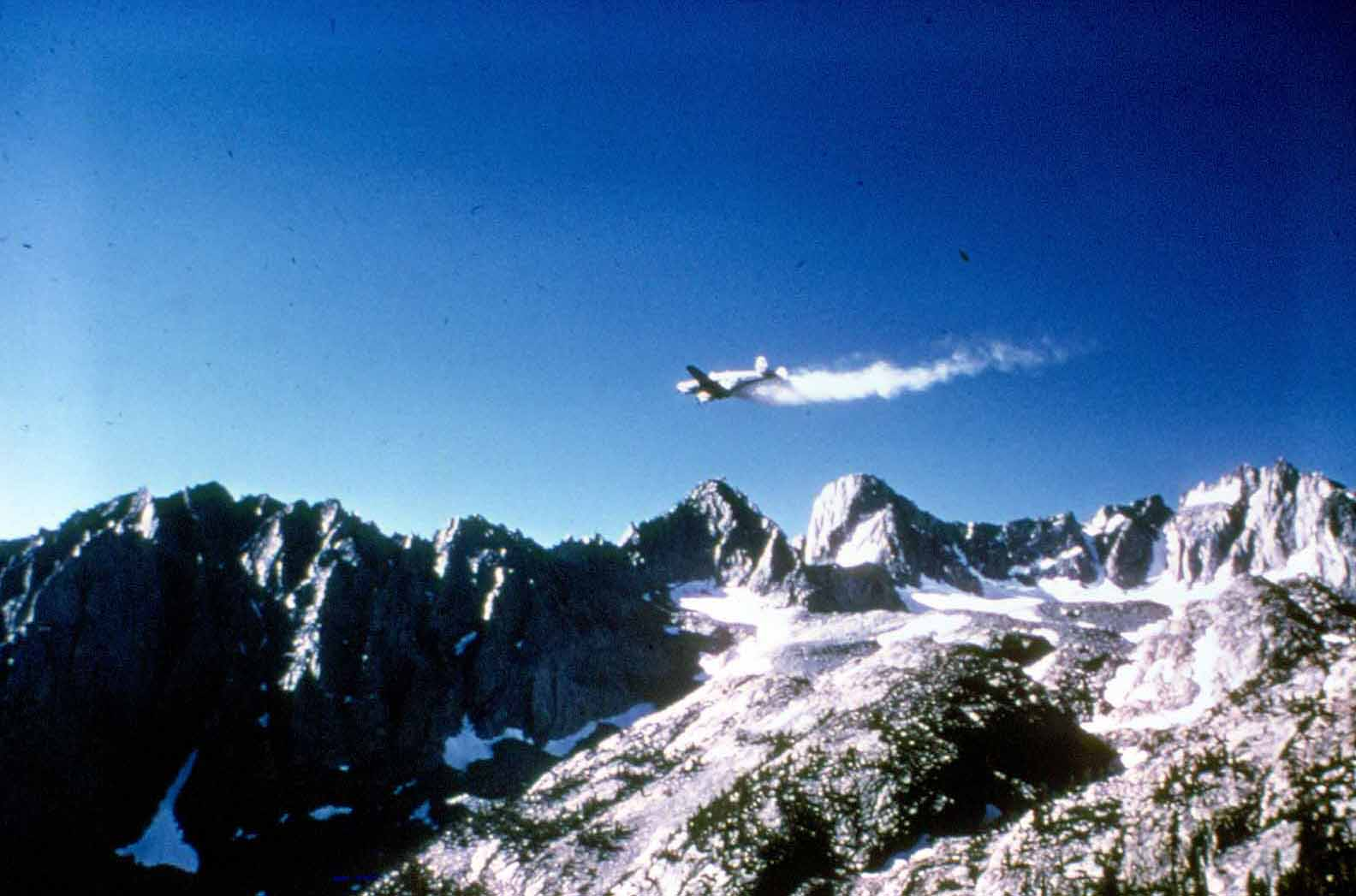
Aerial fish planting, 1977

This is a list of aviation-related events from 1977.

== Events ==
- Uganda Airlines begins flight operations.

=== January ===
- East African Airways ceases all operations. It will go into liquidation in February.
- January 5 – In the Connellan air disaster, Colin Richard Foreman, a disgruntled former employee of Connellan Airways (Connair), steals a Beechcraft Baron 58 and crashes it into a building in the Connair complex at Alice Springs Airport at Alice Springs, Australia, killing himself and four people on the ground and injuring four others.
- January 6 – Natalie "Dolly" Sinatra, the mother of singer Frank Sinatra, and all three other people on board die when their Gates Learjet 24 never changes course after takeoff from Palm Springs Municipal Airport in Palm Springs, California, and crashes into a 10,000-foot (3,000-meter) ridge in the eastern portion of the San Gorgonio Wilderness.
- January 11 – A hijacker claiming to have a hand grenade commandeers Trans World Airlines Flight 700 – a Boeing 747 with 349 people on board flying from New York City′s John F. Kennedy International Airport to London′s Heathrow Airport – demanding to be flown to Uganda. The airliner lands at Heathrow where, after several hours of negotiations, security forces take down the hijacker when he becomes violent.
- January 13 – After a fire breaks out in the No. 1 engine of an Aeroflot Tupolev Tu-104A (registration CCCP-42369) on approach to Alma-Ata Airport in Alma-Ata in the Soviet Union's Kazakh Soviet Socialist Republic, the Tu-104A begins orbiting the airport to burn off fuel. The fire spreads to a fuel tank, causing the fuel tank to explode at an altitude of 300 meters (980 feet). The airliner crashes 3.5 kilometers (2.2 miles) from the airport, killing all 96 people on board. It is the deadliest aviation accident in the history of Kazakhstan at the time.
- January 14 – On approach to Terrace Airport outside Terrace, British Columbia, Canada, during a snowstorm, a Northern Thunderbird Air de Havilland Canada DHC-6 Twin Otter 300 (registration C-GNTB) strikes a hill and crashes 3 kilometers (1.9 miles) south of the airport, killing all 12 people on board.
- January 15 – Linjeflyg Flight 618, a Vickers Viscount 838 operated by Linjeflyg, crashes in Kälvesta, Sweden, just outside Stockholm, killing all 22 on board.
- January 18 – Prime Minister of Yugoslavia Džemal Bijedić and all six others on board are killed when their Gates Learjet 25 crashes into a mountain near Kreševo, Yugoslavia, during a snowstorm.
- January 19 – On approach to Valencia Airport outside Valencia, Spain, an Ejército del Aire CASA C-207C Azor (registration T.7-15) crashes into the side of a mountain near Chiva, killing all 11 people on board.
- January 20 – A new passenger terminal, Passenger Terminal 1, opens at Rio de Janeiro–Galeão International Airport in Rio de Janeiro, Brazil, and all civilian passenger traffic transfers to it. At the time, all major international flights to and from Brazil use the terminal.
- January 22 – Kenya Airways is founded. It will begin flight operations on February 4.

=== February ===
- Beechcraft produces its 10,000th Bonanza, a Bonanza Model 35. The Bonanza is entering its 31st year of production.
- February 4 – Kenya Airways begins flight operations.
- February 9 – Queen Alia of Jordan is killed in a military helicopter crash at Amman, Jordan.
- February 13 – A hijacker commandeers a Turkish Airlines Douglas DC-9-32 with 57 people on board during a domestic flight in Turkey from Istanbul to İzmir, demanding to be flown to Yugoslavia. The airliner lands at İzmir, where the hijacker surrenders.
- February 15 – Attempting to land at Mineralnye Vody Airport in Mineralnye Vody Airport in the Soviet Union's Russian Soviet Federated Socialist Republic, Aeroflot Flight 5003, an Ilyushin Il-18V (registration CCCP-75520), executes a missed approach due to low clouds and fog. While climbing away from the airport, the airliner stalls, crashes into a railway embankment, and bursts into flames, killing 77 of the 98 people on board.
- February 18 – A Space Shuttle is airborne for the first time when the Space Shuttle Enterprise is taken up for a flight atop a Boeing 747 Shuttle Carrier Aircraft. Enterprise does not detach from the carrier aircraft during the flight.

=== March ===
- March 1 – During its initial climb after takeoff from Aden International Airport in Aden South Yemen, an Alyemda Douglas C-47A-25-DK Skytrain (registration 7O-ABF) crashes into the Gulf of Aden, killing all 19 people on board.
- March 3 – Flying in fog, an Italian Air Force Lockheed C-130H Hercules (registration MM61996) crashes into Monte Serra 16 kilometers (9.9 miles) east of Arturo dell'Oro Air Base in Pisa, Italy, killing all 44 people on board.
- March 4 – An Overseas National Airways DC-8-63CF registration N8635 operating a cargo flight for French airline UTA, crashed on approach to Niamey Airport in Niger, causing the deaths of two of the four crew and the write off of the aircraft.
- March 11 – Air Tanzania is founded as the flag carrier of Tanzania. It will commence flight operations on June 1.
- March 14 – An Italian man hijacks an Iberia Boeing 727-256 with 37 people on board during a domestic flight in Spain from Barcelona to Palma on Mallorca in the Balearic Islands, demanding to be flown to Ivory Coast to see his 3-year-old daughter and to Italy to see his 6-year-old daughter. Over the next two days, the airliner makes stops at Algiers in Algeria, Abidjan in Ivory Coast, Seville in Spain, Turin in Italy, Zürich in Switzerland, and Warsaw in Poland before returning to Zürich, where policemen dressed as airline crew members arrest him on March 16.
- March 17
  - A hijacker commandeers an All Nippon Airways Boeing 727-281 during a domestic flight in Japan from Sapporo to Sendai. The airliner diverts to Hakodate, Japan, where the hijacker surrenders.
  - A hijacker commandeers an All Nippon Airways Boeing 727-281 during a domestic flight in Japan from Tokyo′s Haneda Airport to Sendai. The airliner returns to Tokyo, where the hijacker commits suicide.
- March 19
  - Two hijackers take control of a Turkish Airlines Boeing 727-2F2 with 181 people on board during a domestic flight in Turkey from Diyarbakir to Ankara. They force it to fly to Beirut, Lebanon, where they surrender at Beirut International Airport.
  - Brazilian champion race car driver Carlos Pace dies along with the other two people on board when their Piper aircraft crashes near Mairiporã, Brazil.
- March 27 – The Tenerife airport disaster takes place: Attempting to take off in fog from Los Rodeos Airport (now Tenerife North Airport) at Tenerife in the Canary Islands, KLM Flight 4805, a Boeing 747-206B registered as PH-BUF, collided with Pan Am Flight 1736, a Boeing 747-121 registered as N736PA, which was backtracking the runway. All 248 occupants on board the KLM aircraft die, as do 335 of the 396 people aboard the Pan Am plane; all 61 Pan Am survivors are injured. American pin-up model, motion picture actress, and film producer Eve Meyer is among the dead on the Pan Am flight. With a combined total of 583 people killed, the crash remained the worst air disaster in history until September 2001.
- March 30 – Attempting a go-around after encountering fog while attempting to land at Zhdanov Airport in Zhdanov in the Soviet Union's Ukrainian Soviet Socialist Republic, an Aeroflot Yakovlev Yak-40 (registration CCCP-87738), strikes a 9-meter (30-foot) pole with its wing, crashes 1.5 kilometers (0.93 miles) from the airport, and catches fire, killing eight of the 27 people on board.
- March 31 – The captain of a Douglas C-47 military transport plane operated by Swift Air Lines, a commercial airline in the southern Philippines, opens fire in the cabin of the plane with an M16 rifle. The plane carried 34 Philippines soldiers on a charter flight from Zamboanga City, Philippines to Sanga-Sanga Airport on the island of Tawi-Tawi. The pilot, Ernesto Agdulos, grabbed the rifle left in the cockpit, then opened fire, killing six of the soldiers and a flight stewardess, and wounding nine others. After the pilot was disarmed and detained, the co-pilot landed the plane safely. The pilot initially claimed to have no memory of the incident. He later admitted that robbery was his motive.

=== April ===
- Comair, owned by Delta Air Lines, starts operations.
- April 4 – Southern Airways Flight 242, a Douglas DC-9-31, enters a severe thunderstorm which breaks the plane's windshield; the aircraft's engines ingest so much water and hail that they both flameout. The plane glides to a crash landing on a rural highway, killing 62 out of 85 people aboard – including rhythm and blues singer Annette Snell – and eight people on the ground; all 22 survivors are injured.
- April 10 – A Taxi Aéreo El Venado Douglas DC-3A-438 (registration HK-556), disappears with the loss of all 35 people on board during a domestic flight in Colombia from La Uribe to Bogotá. Its wreckage is discovered on May 15 at an elevation of 7,200 feet (2,200 meters) on Saliente del Rio Guape Mountain in the Cordillera Oriental.
- April 19 – A Soviet Air Forces Antonov An-24 (NATO reporting name "Coke") carrying Soviet Air Defense Forces pilots to their base at Tapa Airfield in Tapa in the Soviet Union's Estonian Soviet Socialist Republic flies too low while passing through a snow flurry on approach to the airfield, strikes the chimney of a spirit factory, crashes at Moe, and burns out, killing all 21 people on board. It is the deadliest aviation accident in the history of Estonia.
- April 24 – A hijacker commandeers a LOT Polish Airlines Tupolev Tu-134 bound from Kraków, Poland, to Nuremberg, East Germany. Security forces storm the airliner at Kraków and arrest the hijacker.
- April 25 – Two hijackers seize control of an Ethiopian Airlines Douglas DC-3 making a domestic flight in Ethiopia from Mek'ele to Gondar. The hijackers are taken down.
- April 27 – An Aviateca Convair 240 crashes near Guatemala City, Guatemala, due to a maintenance error, killing all 28 people on board. The incident is known as the 1977 Aviateca Convair 240 crash.
- April 29 – The British government nationalizes the British Aircraft Corporation, Hawker Siddeley Aviation, Hawker Siddeley Dynamics, and Scottish Aviation and merges them to form British Aerospace. They retain their individual identities at first, but eventually become divisions of British Aerospace.

=== May ===
- British Airways pilots fly three Cyprus Airways airliners – two Hawker Siddeley Tridents and a BAC One-Eleven – out of Nicosia International Airport on Cyprus to the United Kingdom; the planes had been stranded at Nicosia International since the permanent closure of airport during the Turkish invasion of Cyprus in July 1974. No test flights precede these flights because Turkey does not permit any. A third Cyprus Airways Trident is left derelict at the abandoned airport, too badly damaged by small arms fire during the fighting in July 1974 to be worth repairing.
- May 2
  - After an Iberia Boeing 727 arriving from Madrid, Spain, lands at Rome′s Leonardo da Vinci–Fiumicino Airport, a Libyan man being deported from Spain who wants to return to Spain to see his fiancée threatens the flight crew with a knife and demands that the plane fly him back to Madrid immediately. He allows all the other passengers to disembark. While the airliner is still on the ground at Rome, one of the pilots disables the hijacker by activating a fire extinguisher, and the hijacker is overpowered and arrested.
  - American automotive executive Ed Cole dies in the crash near Mendon, Michigan, of the Beagle B.206S2 he is piloting after he flies into a storm.
- May 8 – One hour after takeoff, 26-year-old Bruce Trayer holds a razor to a flight attendant′s neck and demands access to the cockpit of Northwest Orient Airlines Flight 22 – a Boeing 747 with 262 people on board bound from Tokyo′s Haneda Airport to Honolulu, Hawaii – where he demands to be flown to Moscow. A male flight attendant hits Trayer over the head with the cockpit crash axe, after which Trayer is overpowered. United States Air Force Air Police officers aboard the plane as passengers restrain Trayer, and the airliner returns to Tokyo, where Japanese authorities arrest him.
- May 10 – An Israeli Air Force Sikorsky CH-53 Sea Stallion helicopter crashes in the Jordan Valley during a military exercise, killing all 54 people on board.
- May 14 – A Boeing 707-321C cargo aircraft operated by Dan Air Services Limited crashes during its approach to Lusaka Airport, Zambia. All six occupants of the aircraft were killed.
- May 15 – At the Biggin Hill Air Show in Biggin Hill, London, England, a sightseeing helicopter strikes the underside of a de Havilland Tiger Moth biplane at an altitude of 200 feet (61 meters), shearing off the Tiger Moth's landing gear. The Tiger Moth lands safely with no injuries to the two people aboard. Aboard the helicopter, five people die and one is injured.
- May 16 – Motion picture director Michael Findlay and two other passengers are instantly slashed to death by the rotors of a New York Airways Sikorsky S-61L helicopter after its landing gear collapses while they are boarding it on the roof of the Pan Am Building in New York City; another passenger boarding the helicopter is seriously injured and soon dies as well. The rotors detach and disintegrate, and a woman walking on the street below is killed by falling debris. The accident prompts the closure of the rooftop heliport.
- May 26 – A hijacker forces an Aeroflot Antonov An-24B with 23 people on board making a domestic flight in the Soviet Union from Donetsk to Riga to divert to Stockholm, Sweden. The hijacker surrenders at Stockholm.
- May 27 – Aeroflot Flight 331, an Ilyushin Il-62M, strikes power lines in bad weather and crashes 1 km (0.62 mi) from José Martí International Airport at Havana, Cuba, while on final approach, killing 68 of the 70 people on board and one person on the ground.
- May 29 – The keel of the first aircraft carrier to be built in Spain, Principe de Asturias, is laid at Ferrol.
- May 31 – The Vietnam People's Air Force is separated from the Vietnamese Air Defense Force.

=== June ===
- The Bell 212 becomes the first helicopter certified by the U.S. Federal Aviation Administration for single-pilot instrument flight rules operation with fixed floats.
- June 1 – Air Tanzania begins flight operations. It is the flag carrier of Tanzania.
- June 3 – A Brazilian Air Force Embraer EMB 110 Bandeirante crashes just after takeoff from Natal Airport outside Natal, Brazil, killing all 18 people on board.
- June 5 – A hijacker commandeers a Middle East Airlines Boeing 707 during a flight from Beirut, Lebanon, to Baghdad, Iraq, demanding to be flown to Kuwait. Security forces storm the plane and arrest the hijacker at Kuwait.
- June 18 – A hijacker seizes control of a Balkan Bulgarian Airlines Antonov An-24 during a domestic flight in Bulgaria from Vidin to Sofia and forces it to divert to Belgrade, Yugoslavia. The hijacker surrenders at Belgrade.
- June 21
  - A United States Navy Lockheed EC-130Q TACAMO aircraft crashes into the Pacific Ocean 1.5 kilometers (0.93 miles) off Wake Island just after a night takeoff from Wake Island Airfield, killing all 16 people on board.
  - A hijacker commandeers a LAN Chile Boeing 727 during a domestic flight in Chile from Antofagasta to Santiago. The airliner diverts to Mendoza, Argentina, where security forces storm it and arrest the hijacker.
- June 22 – National Airlines inaugurates service between Miami, Florida, and Paris, France, thus becoming the only airline to offer service from the Southern United States to Paris.
- June 28 – A hijacker commandeers a Lufthansa Boeing 727 flying from Frankfurt-am-Main, West Germany, to Istanbul, Turkey. The airliner diverts to Munich, West Germany.
- June 29 – A Lebanese man armed with a pistol and two hand grenades hijacks a Gulf Air Vickers VC-10-1101 with 68 people on board flying from London to Dubai and Muscat. The airliner diverts to Doha, Qatar, where soldiers overpower the hijacker.
- June 30 – President of the United States Jimmy Carter cancels the United States Air Force's Rockwell B-1 Lancer bomber program.

=== July ===
- July 5 – Four passengers hijack a Ladeco Boeing 727-78 (registration CC-CFG) shortly after it takes off from Arica, Chile, for a domestic flight to Santiago. The plane refuels at Lima, Peru, then flies them to Havana, Cuba.
- July 8 – Six hijackers commandeer a Kuwait Airways Boeing 707 during a flight from Beirut, Lebanon, to Kuwait City, Kuwait, and force it to fly to Damascus, Syria, where they surrender to the authorities.
- July 10 – Two hijackers take control of an Aeroflot Tupolev Tu-134 (registration CCCP-65639) during a domestic flight in the Soviet Union from Petrozavodsk to Leningrad and force it to fly to Helsinki, Finland, where they surrender to the authorities.
- July 14 – UNITA rebels shoot down a People's Air Force of Angola Antonov An-26 near Cuangar, Angola, killing all 30 people on board.
- July 20 – Attempting to take off from Vitim Airport in Vitim in the Soviet Union's Russian Soviet Federated Socialist Republic on a wet runway with a tailwind, Aeroflot Flight B-2, an Avia 14M (registration CCCP-52096), strikes a fence and trees before crashing into a forest 500 meters (1,600 feet) north-northwest of the airport, killing 39 of the 40 people on board.
- July 21 – The Libyan-Egyptian War begins. Egyptian Air Force planes shoot down two Libyan Arab Republic Air Force aircraft.
- July 22 – The Egyptian Air Force makes a full-scale attack on a major Libyan Arab Republic Air Force base at El Adem, reportedly killing three Soviet military advisers.
- July 23 - After threats of shutting down transatlantic air traffic, the U.S. and British governments reach the Bermuda II accord, giving British airlines additional ports of entry in the United States and removing American airlines' rights to carry passengers beyond London and Hong Kong.
- July 23–24 – Further Egyptian Air Force attacks destroy large numbers of Libyan aircraft before a ceasefire ends the war. Egypt admits the loss of two planes during the last two days of the war.
- July 24 – Attempting a night landing in heavy rain at El Tepual Airport in Puerto Montt, Chile, a Chilean Air Force Douglas DC-6B crashes into a swamp and bursts into flames, killing 38 of the 82 people on board.
- July 25 – A Honduran Air Force Douglas C-47-DL Skytrain suffers the failure of its No. 1 engine and crashes in mountainous terrain near Yoro, Honduras, killing 25 of the 40 people on board.

=== August ===
- August 1 – Francis Gary Powers – the American U-2 pilot shot down over the Soviet Union in 1960 and held captive there until 1962 – dies when the KNBC television news Bell 206 Jet Ranger helicopter he is piloting runs out of fuel and crashes in the Sepulveda Dam Recreation Area in Los Angeles, California.
- August 12
  - A hijacker commandeers an Air France Airbus A300 with 242 people on board during a flight from Nice, France, to Cairo, Egypt. The airliner diverts to Brindisi, Italy, where security forces storm the plane and arrest the hijacker.
  - The Space Shuttle Enterprise makes its first flight, a test glide in the atmosphere after detaching from a Boeing 747 Shuttle Carrier Aircraft.
- August 20 – A hijacker takes control of Western Airlines Flight 550 – a Boeing 707 with 31 people on board flying from San Diego, California, to Denver, Colorado – and demands to be flown to Mexico. The airliner lands at Salt Lake City, Utah, where the hijacker surrenders.
- August 23 – Piloted by racing cyclist Bryan Allen, the Gossamer Condor becomes the first human-powered aeroplane to make a fully controlled flight, flying a 1.35-mile (2.17-km) figure-eight course around two pylons 0.8 km (0.50 mi) apart at Shafter, California, to demonstrate sustained, controlled flight. The flight wins its designer, Dr. Paul McCready, the £50,000 Kremer Prize.
- August 31 – Soviet test pilot Alexander V. Fedotov zoom climbs the Mikoyan-Gurevich Ye-266 – a modified Mikoyan-Gurevich MiG-25RB (NATO reporting name "Foxbat") – to attain an altitude of 123,524 feet (37,650 meters) briefly, setting a new world altitude record for air-breathing aircraft.

=== September ===
- September 4 – Flying under visual flight rules in instrument meteorological conditions, a SAN Ecuador Vickers 746D Viscount (registration HC-BCL) crashes into a mountain in the Cajas Mountains 40 kilometers (25 miles) north of Cuenca, Ecuador, killing all 33 people on board.
- September 5 – A hijacker commandeers a Garuda Indonesia Douglas DC-9-32 during a domestic flight in Indonesia from Yogyakarta to Surabaya. The hijacker is taken down at Surabaya.
- September 6 – An Alaska Aeronautical Industries de Havilland Canada DHC-6 Twin Otter 200 (registration N563MA) operating as Flight 302 in instrument meteorological conditions crashes into the southwest side of Alaska's Mount Iliamna at an altitude of 7,000 feet (2,100 meters), killing all 13 people on board.
- September 8 – A Burma Airways de Havilland Canada DHC-6 Twin Otter 300 (registration XY-AEH) disappears during a flight to Kengtung, Burma, with the loss of all 25 people on board. Its wreckage is discovered on Burma's Mount Loi Hsam Hsao on September 11.
- September 9 – Maxie Anderson, Ben Abruzzo, and Ed Yost depart Marshfield, Massachusetts, in the balloon Double Eagle in an attempt to make the first crossing of the Atlantic Ocean in a balloon. They fail when they are forced to abort the flight on September 13 off Iceland.
- September 14 – A United States Air Force Boeing EC-135K crashes in steep terrain at an altitude of 8,500 feet (2,600 meters) in the Manzano Mountains 8 kilometers (5.0 miles) east of Kirtland Air Force Base in Albuquerque, New Mexico, killing all 20 people on board.
- September 21 – Malév Hungarian Airlines Flight 203, a Tupolev Tu-134 (registration HA-LBC), crashes 6.3 kilometers (3.9 miles) southwest of Urziceni, Romania, while on approach to Bucharest Otopeni International Airport in Bucharest, killing 32 of the 56 people on board.
- September 26 – Laker Airways inaugurates its no-booking "Skytrain" service between London and New York
- September 27
  - On approach to land at Sultan Abdul Aziz Shah Airport in Subang, Malaysia, Japan Airlines Flight 715, a Douglas DC-8, crashes into a hill 6.5 km (4.0 mi) short of the airport near the Ladang Elmina estate. Thirty-four of the 79 people on board die, and all 45 survivors are injured.
  - A United States Marine Corps RF-4B-41-MC flown by a crew based at nearby Naval Air Facility Atsugi crashes into a residential neighborhood of Yokohama, Japan. The crash kills two boys, ages 1 and 3, and injures seven others, several seriously. The crewmen of the aircraft both eject and are not seriously injured.
- September 28 – Five Japanese Red Army (JRA) members hijack Japan Airlines Flight 472, a Douglas DC-8 with 151 other people on board, after takeoff from Bombay, India. The hijackers force the plane to land in Dhaka, Bangladesh, where they demand US$6 million and the release of nine imprisoned JRA members in Japan. On October 1, the Japanese government releases six of the prisoners and exchanges them for 118 of the hostages aboard the plane on October 2. On October 3, the plane flies to Kuwait City, Kuwait, and Damascus, Syria, where the hijackers release 11 more hostages. Ultimately, the plane flies to Algeria, where it is impounded and all the remaining hostages are released.
- September 30 – A man armed with a pistol and a hand grenade hijacks an Air Inter Sud Aviation SE-210 Caravelle during a domestic flight in France from Paris′s Orly Airport to Lyon. The airliner returns to Orly Airport. After eight hours of negotiations, police fire tear gas grenades into the plane and storm it. The hijacker throws his hand grenade toward the cockpit and it explodes, killing one passenger. The police then exchange gunfire with the hijacker and arrest him.

=== October ===
- October 11 – Two hijackers commandeer a CSA Czech Airlines Yakovlev Yak-40 during a domestic flight in Czechoslovakia from Karlovy Vary to Prague and force it to fly to Frankfurt-am-Main, West Germany, where they surrender to the authorities.
- October 13 – Four members of the Popular Front for the Liberation of Palestine calling themselves the "Commando Martyr Halime" hijack Lufthansa Flight 181 – the Boeing 737-230 Adv Landshut, with 91 other people on board – over the Mediterranean Sea south of France. The aircraft lands first at Rome, Italy, for refueling, then at Larnaca, Cyprus, and then early on October 14 at Bahrain. On October 17 it flies to Aden, South Yemen, where the terrorist leader murders the aircraft's captain, and then on to Mogadishu, Somalia. There, in Operation Feuerzauber ("Fire Magic"), the West German counterterrorism unit GSG 9 storms the plane on October 18 and frees the hostages, killing three of the hijackers and wounding and capturing the fourth.
- October 17
  - Two men armed with submachine guns hijack an Air Djibouti de Havilland Canada DHC-6 Twin Otter before it takes off from Tadjoura Airport in Tadjoura, Djibouti. They kill the French pilot and one of the passengers who is the mother of a cabinet member of the government of Djibouti.
  - The American ban of the Concorde is lifted when the Supreme Court of the United States declines to overturn a lower court's ruling rejecting the Port Authority of New York and New Jersey's efforts to continue the ban.
- October 18 – Hijackers aboard a LOT Polish Airlines Antonov An-24B (registration SP-LTH) making a domestic flight in Poland from Katowice to Poland demand to be flown to Austria but are taken down.
- October 20
  - A chartered Convair CV-240 carrying 26 people including members of the rock band Lynyrd Skynyrd runs out of fuel and crashes in a forest at Gillsburg, Mississippi. Among the six dead are band members Ronnie Van Zant, Steve Gaines, and Cassie Gaines, and a manager for the band, and the rest of the band members are injured.
  - Free on bail after an arrest for a September bank robbery, 29-year-old Thomas Michael Hannan draws a gun aboard Frontier Airlines Flight 101, a Boeing 737-200 boarding during the early morning at Grand Rapids, Michigan, for a flight to Lincoln, Nebraska. He orders it to fly to Atlanta, Georgia, and demands the release from jail in Atlanta of his homosexual partner and co-defendant in the bank robbery, George David Stewart, as well as US$3 million, two parachutes, two machine guns, two .45-caliber pistols, and other weapons. The airliner takes off with 30 of its passengers and four crew members aboard. When it stops to refuel in Kansas City, Missouri, authorities tell Hannan it will not be allowed to take off again, but they relent after he releases the 15 women and children aboard as passengers, leaving 11 male passengers, two stewardesses, the pilot, and the copilot aboard as hostages. The plane arrives at Atlanta just after noon. During lengthy negotiations at Hartsfield International Airport in Atlanta, Stewart is brought from Fulton County Jail to plead with Hannan to surrender. During the afternoon, Hannan releases the two stewardesses, and he allows the 11 remaining passengers – one of them an old high school friend of his who helped negotiate the release of the hostages – to disembark during the evening. With only the pilot and copilot left aboard with Hannan, Hannan's lawyer in the bank robbery case boards the airliner to talk with him, and during the conversation, Hannan sits down and shoots himself to death.
- October 26–31 – A Pan American World Airways Boeing 747SP circumnavigates the world over the two poles.
- October 28 – Four passengers hijack a Vietnam Airlines Douglas DC-3 (registration VN-C509) with 36 people on board making a domestic flight in Vietnam from Ho Chi Minh City to Phú Quốc and demand to be flown to Singapore. A struggle ensues during which two Vietnamese officials are killed. The airliner stops at U-Tapao Air Base in Thailand to refuel, then proceeds to Singapore, where it lands at Seletar Airport.
- October 31 – The first British all-female airline flight crew makes the inaugural British Air Ferries service from Southend to Düsseldorf with Handley Page Dart Herald G-BDFE. The crew comprises Captain Caroline Frost, First Officer Lesley Hardym and stewardesses Liz Howard and Hildegard Donbavand.

=== November ===
- November 1 – The Tupolev Tu-144 supersonic transport enters passenger service, flying an Aeroflot domestic route in the Soviet Union between Moscow and Alma-Ata. It had been flying air mail and cargo flights since December 1975, also between Moscow and Alma-Ata.
- November 3 – A Britten-Norman BN-2A-8 Islander (registration XA-FUA) operated by Servicios Aéreos Martinez Leon and carrying officials of the National Indian Institute crashes and burns on approach to San Cristóbal de las Casas National Airport in San Cristóbal de las Casas, Mexico, killing all 13 people on board.
- November 19 – On its third attempt to land in heavy rain, strong winds, and poor visibility at Madeira Airport in Funchal in Portugal's Madeira Islands, TAP Portugal Flight 425, a Boeing 727-282Adv, overruns the runway and crashes, killing 131 of the 164 people on board.
- November 21 – Beginning its descent to San Carlos de Bariloche Airport in San Carlos de Bariloche, Argentina, prematurely, Austral Lineas Aéreas Flight 9, a BAC One-Eleven 420EL (registration LV-JGY), crashes near Cerro Pichileufú, 21 kilometers (13 miles) east of San Carlos de Bariloche, killing 46 of the 79 people on board.
- November 23 – President Jimmy Carter signs U.S. Public Law 95-202, Title IV, recognizing members of the World War II Women Airforce Service Pilots as veterans for the first time.
- November 25 – A French Air Force Nord 2501F Noratlas with a faulty autopilot crashes into a mountain near Béziers, France, killing all 32 people on board.

=== December ===
- December 2 – A Tupolev Tu-154, leased by Libyan Arab Airlines from Balkan Bulgarian Airlines to operate Hajj pilgrim charter flights, crashes near Benghazi, Libya, after running out of fuel. Fifty-nine of the 165 passengers and crew on board are killed.
- December 4 – After apparently being hijacked by an unknown party, a Malaysian Airline System Flight 653, a Boeing 737-200, crashes at Tanjung Kupang, Johor, in Malaysia. All 100 people on board die, including the Malaysian Agricultural Minister, Dato' Ali Haji Ahmad; Malaysian Public Works Department Head Dato' Mahfuz Khalid; and Cuban Ambassador to Japan Mario García. It is first fatal accident in the history of Malaysian Airlines.
- December 9 – An Aeroflot Antonov An-24RV (registration CCCP-47695) stalls immediately after takeoff from Tarko-Sale Airport in Tarko-Sale in the Soviet Union's Russian Soviet Federated Socialist Republic, crashes about 4 kilometers (2.5 miles) from Tarko-Sale, and burns, killing 17 of the 23 people on board.
- December 11 – A United States Navy Lockheed P-3B-80-LO Orion on a maritime night patrol crashes into a 5,200-foot (1,600-meter) mountain on El Hierro in Spain's Canary Islands at an altitude of 2,300 feet (700 meters), killing all 13 occupants onboard.
- December 13 – Air Indiana Flight 216, a National Jet Services Douglas DC-3 operating a charter flight, crashes on takeoff from Evansville, Indiana, en route to Nashville International Airport in Nashville, Tennessee, killing all 29 on board, including all but one player and all of the coaches of the University of Evansville men's basketball team.
- December 17 – United Airlines Flight 2860, a Douglas DC-8-54AF Jet Trader cargo aircraft, crashes into a mountain in the Wasatch Range near Kaysville, Utah. The entire crew of three is killed.
- December 18 – SA de Transport Aérien Flight 730, a Sud Aviation SE-210 Caravelle 10R, crashes in the Atlantic Ocean while on approach to Madeira Airport at Funchal in Portugal's Madeira Islands, killing 36 of the 57 people on board. Many of the occupants drown when they are trapped in the airliner's sinking wreckage. It is the second fatal air crash at Funchal in a month, the first having been TAP Portugal Flight 425, which had crashed on November 19.
- December 25 – A hijacker commandeers Eastern Airlines Flight 668 – a Douglas DC-9 with 36 people on board flying from Miami, Florida, to Indianapolis, Indiana – demanding to be flown to Cuba. The airliner diverts to Atlanta, Georgia, where police storm the plane and arrest the hijacker.
- December 29 – A SAN Ecuador Vickers 764D Viscount (registration HC-BEM) flying in poor weather crashes into a hill near Cuenca, Ecuador, killing all 24 people on board.

== First flights ==
=== January ===
- January 6 - HAL HPT-32 X2157
- January 20 - Fournier RF-9
- January 29 - Schleicher ASW 20
- January 31 - Cessna Citation II

=== February ===
- Bell 214ST
- February 26 - Issoire Iris

=== April ===
- April 22 - Glaser-Dirks DG-200

=== May ===
- May 3 - Bell Model 301 NASA702 - first free hovering flight
- May 20 - Sukhoi T-10 (prototype of Sukhoi Su-27)
- May 26 - NDN Firecracker G-NDNI

=== June ===
- June 3 - Slingsby Vega
- June 27 - CASA C.101 Aviojet

=== July ===
- July 7 - PZL M-17
- July 9 — Zenair CH 300
- July 25 - Aero Design DG-1 N10E
- July 28 — Start + Flug Globetrotter

=== August ===
- August 13 - Space Shuttle Enterprise (glide test)
- August 15 - Embraer EMB-111
- August 24 - Learjet 28

=== September ===
- September 5 – Aérospatiale SA 331, prototype of the Aérospatiale SA 332 Super Puma
- September 7 — Aviafiber Canard 2FL

=== October ===
- October 6 - Mikoyan MiG-29
- October 20 - General Avia F15F I-PROL
- October 27 - RFB Fantrainer 98+30

=== November ===
- November 2 — Conroy Tri-Turbo-Three
- November 15 — Rutan Quickie

=== December ===
- December 1 - Lockheed Have Blue
- December 14 - Mil Mi-26
- December 22 - Aérospatiale Epsilon
- December 22 - Antonov An-72 ("Coaler")

== Entered service ==
=== March ===
- Boeing E-3 Sentry with United States Air Force 964th Airborne Air Control Squadron

=== September ===
- Cessna 441 Conquest II
- September 26 - Mitsubishi F-1 with Japan Air Self-Defense Force

=== November ===
- Beechcraft T-34C Turbo-Mentor with United States Navy Naval Air Training Command
- November 1 – Tupolev Tu-144

== Retirements ==
=== June ===
- June 30 – Handley Page Hastings by the Royal Air Force -

=== December ===
- December 20 – Boeing B-47 Stratojet-an EB-47E on indefinite loan to the United States Navy made the last operational flight of a stratojet

== Deadliest crash ==
The Tenerife airport disaster on 27 March heavily defined 1977 in aviation; it is the deadliest accident in aviation history. Two Boeing 747's collided on the runway at Los Rodeos Airport on the island of Tenerife, Spain in heavy fog; 583 people were killed, far exceeding the death toll of any previous accident and unbeaten since. This included all 248 people aboard KLM Flight 4805, whose pilot committed the main factor in the accident of taking off without a clearance; and 335 of the 396 people on board Pan Am Flight 1736, the other 747 involved in the accident. The crash is arguably the most famous of all time; it changed the history and training of aviation in the years that followed. The deadliest single-aircraft accident of the year was TAP Flight 425 a Boeing 727 which overran the runway while landing at Madeira Airport in Funchal Portugal on 19 November Killing 131 out of the 164 occupants on board. Elsewhere, 1977 had relatively few accidents in comparison to the years immediately preceding and succeeding it.
