= Fournier RF-9 =

French / German touring motor glider, 1977

RF-9
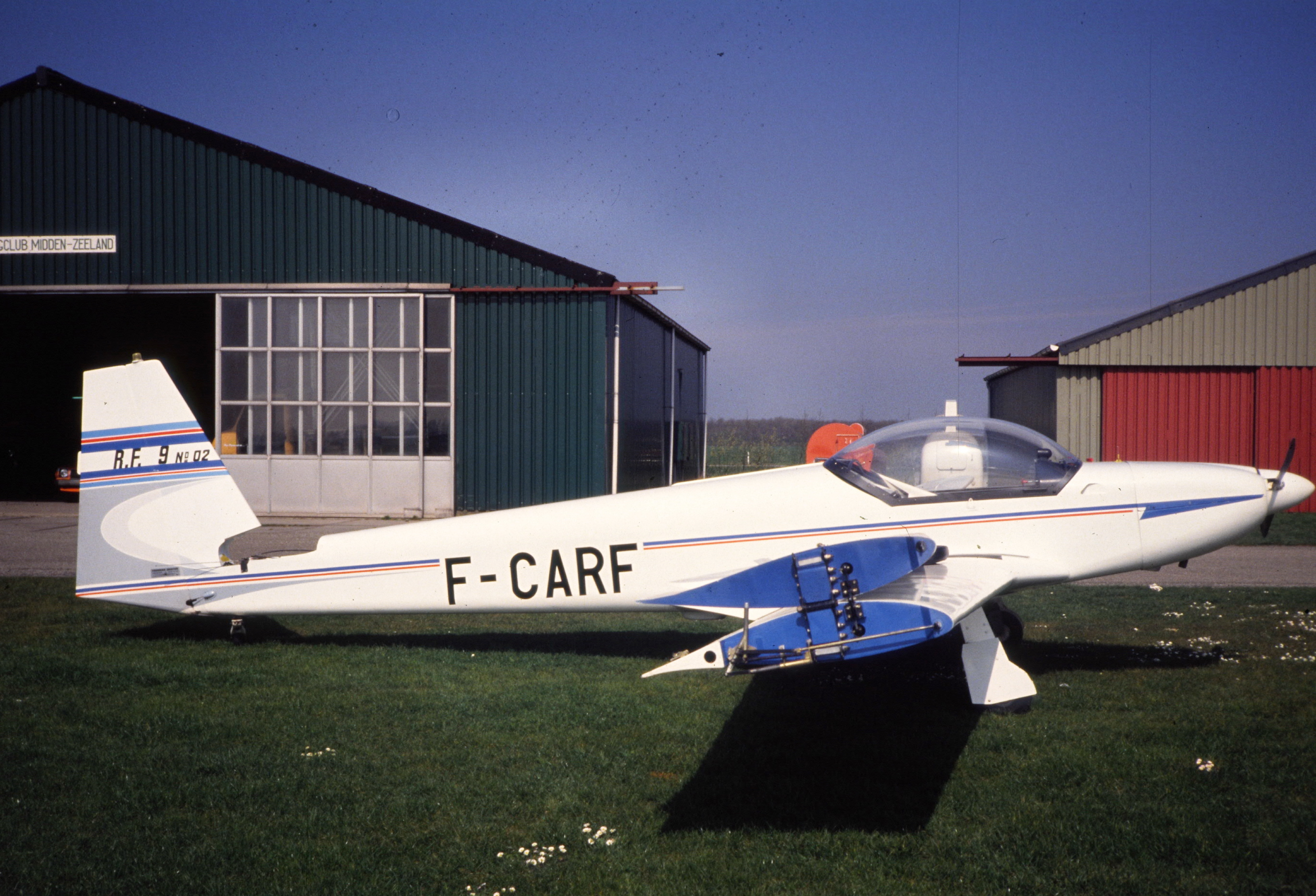
- Fournier RF-9 motorglider F-CARF at Midden-Zeeland Airport (EHMZ), April 1, 1989

General information
- Type: Motorglider
- National origin: France
- Designer: René Fournier

History
- First flight: 13 January 1977

The Fournier RF-9 is a two-seat motorglider of conventional sailplane configuration. Originally produced in France, manufacturing was later taken over by ABS Aircraft in Switzerland, and then by Gomolzig in Germany. The pilot and passenger are accommodated side-by-side, and the aircraft's wings are foldable for ease of storage. It first flew in 1977. The licence-built example was known as the Fournier RF-9 ABS but only one, registration D-KHGO (w/nr.9021) was ever constructed. In 1994, ABS Aircraft GmbH left the development of ABS RF-9 though two further kits had been built, and were later constructed by the Polish Aircraft company Polavia.

== Specifications (RF-9) ==
Data from Jane's All the World's Aircraft 1982–83

General characteristics

- Crew: 2
- Length: 7.86 m (25 ft 9 in)
- Wingspan: 17.00 m (55 ft 9 in)
- Height: 1.93 m (6 ft 4 in)
- Wing area: 18.00 m^{2} (193.8 sq ft)
- Aspect ratio: 16.1:1
- Empty weight: 520 kg (1,146 lb)
- Max takeoff weight: 750 kg (1,653 lb)
- Powerplant: 1 × Limbach SL1700 4-cyl. air-cooled horizontally opposed piston engine, 50 kW (67 hp)

Performance

- Cruise speed: 170 km/h (110 mph, 92 kn) (max cruise)
- Stall speed: 65 km/h (40 mph, 35 kn)
- Range: 1,000 km (620 mi, 540 nmi)
- Service ceiling: 3,000 m (9,800 ft)
- Rate of climb: 3.0 m/s (590 ft/min)

== See also ==
- Fournier RF 4
- Fournier RF 5
