= Emanuel Santos =

Portuguese artist (born 1976)

- Born: 20 November 1976 (age 50); Madeira, Portugal
- Notable work: Sculpture of Cristiano Ronaldo at Madeira Airport
- Children: 1

Emanuel Jorge da Silva Santos (born 20 November 1976) is a Portuguese artist from Madeira, Portugal. In 2017, he became famous for a sculpture of Madeiran native footballer Cristiano Ronaldo which was widely derided by media outlets. The English newspaper The Guardian commented “suddenly, this sculptor was the most famous artist in the world”.

== Personal life ==
Santos is married and has one son. He lives in Caniçal, the principal cargo port of Madeira and works part-time at Cristiano Ronaldo International Airport. In 2017, Santos became leader of Caniçal Parish Council, when his centre-left PS party won the local election.

== Works ==
Santos makes sculptures and paintings in acrylic on canvas. His works are installed several public locations on Madeira.

In 2016, Santos created a monument to fishermen in the port of Caniçal. The life-size sculpture depicts two fishermen in a small boat, and is sited on a roundabout on the seafront.

=== Busts of Cristiano Ronaldo ===
Santos has created two busts of Cristiano Ronaldo. On March 29, 2017, the first was unveiled at the newly renamed Cristiano Ronaldo International Airport, the main airport serving Madeira. The renaming ceremony was attended by Ronaldo, President Marcelo Rebelo de Sousa, and Prime Minister António Costa, among other guests and hundreds of fans. The sculpture received a strong reaction from news outlets and on social media following its unveiling, with most commenting on the work's lack of resemblance to Ronaldo, and was intended to be on permanent display outside the airport's terminal entrance. In 2018, Bleacher Report commissioned Santos to create a second bust of Ronaldo. The original sculpture was to continue to be displayed at the airport.

Writing in The Guardian, the art critic Eddy Frankel compared the public reaction to the first Ronaldo bust to the imposition of socialist realism (the official art of the Soviet Union), but with the rules enforced by the public. Frankel preferred Santos's first bust, commenting:

The original really is a better sculpture. It’s an ecstatic mess, its face a hybrid of Ronaldo and Santos’s, two sets of features squidged together. It’s the artist seeing something of himself in the rags-to-riches glory of Ronaldo. It’s feverish, intense; the work of someone driven obsessively. The new version is someone forced into a do-over to save face. Whereas the eyes of the original bust seem pointed in a thousand directions – joyful, unfocused and giddy – the eyes of the new one look to a faraway point. They are lost, cold, sullen. This is a dead sculpture, an acceptance of defeat in the face of public outcry. And it will be immediately forgotten.

In June 2018, the first bust was removed from display at the airport and replaced with a bust of Ronaldo by a Spanish sculptor.

==== Original bust ====
===== Description and history =====
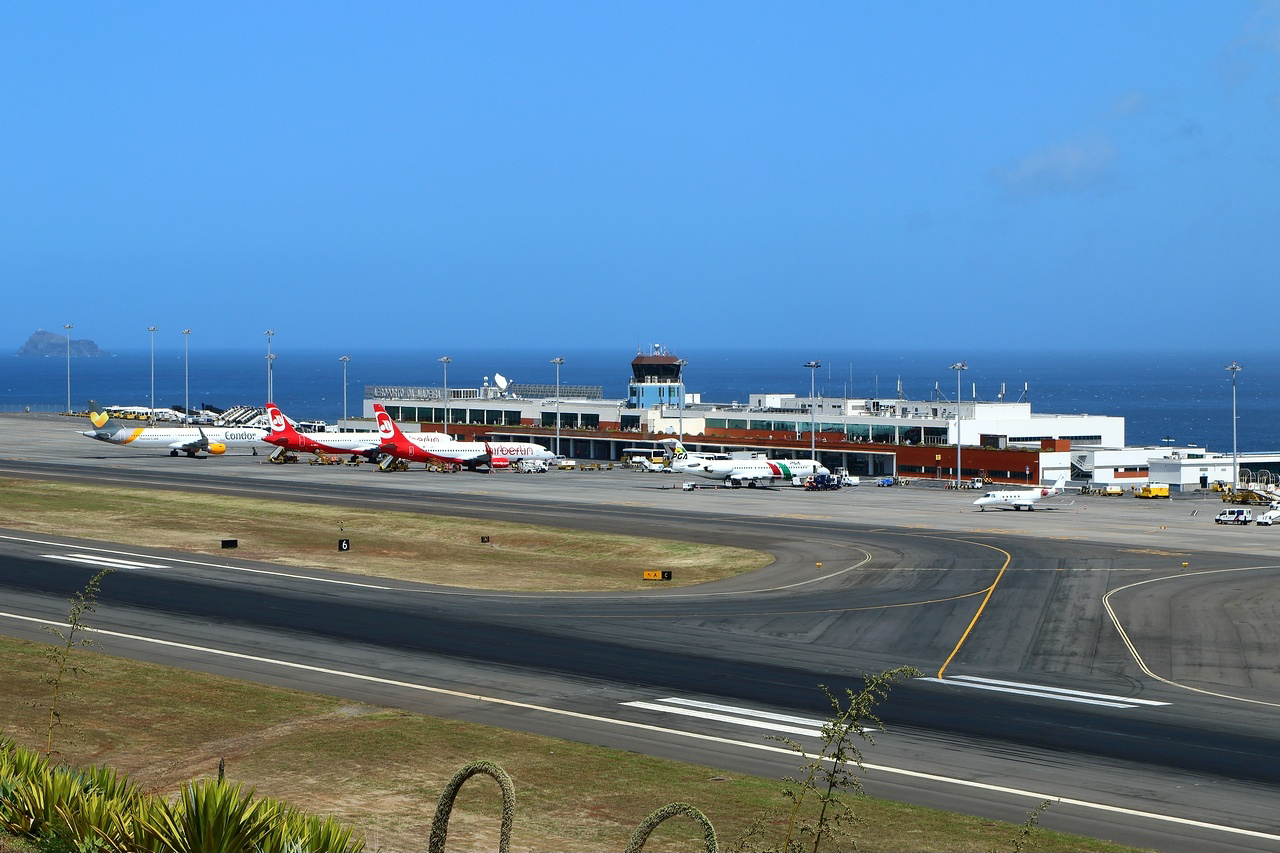
The bust was unveiled at Cristiano Ronaldo International Airport's (pictured in 2015) terminal entrance in 2017.

The original bust was said by Santos to take between two and three weeks to complete, and was "not as simple as it seems" to create. He based his work on photographs of Ronaldo, who was unavailable to model in person. According to Santos, Ronaldo saw pictures of the proposed bust and only requested small adjustments to make his appearance more youthful. Santos recalled:

He only asked for some wrinkles that gave him a certain expression in his face when he's about to laugh to be changed... He said it made him look older and asked for it to be thinned out a bit to make it smoother and more jovial. But they gave it the go-ahead and they liked what they saw.

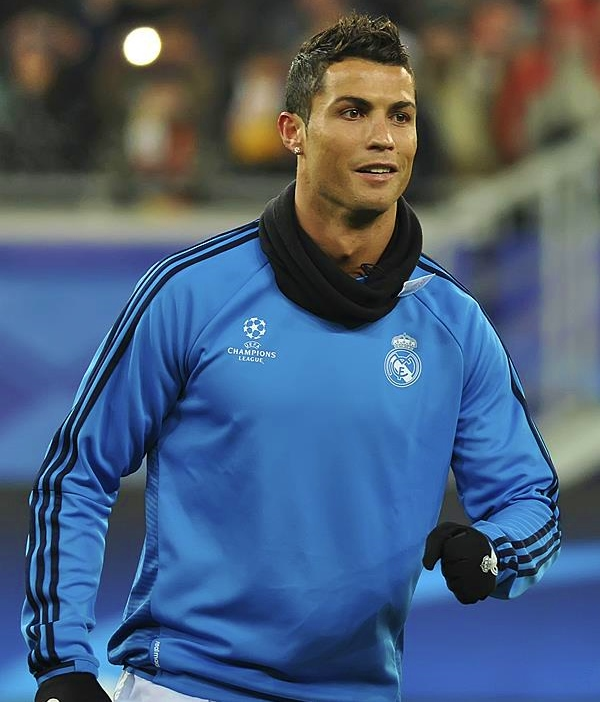
Cristiano Ronaldo (pictured in 2015) attended the unveiling.

The sculpture was unveiled by Ronaldo on March 29, 2017, as part of an official ceremony to rename Maderia Airport to Cristiano Ronaldo International Airport. The reportedly "bizarre" and "eccentric" event was also attended by the nation's president, Marcelo Rebelo de Sousa, and prime minister, António Costa, who unveiled a commemorative plaque together, as well as dozens of other guests and hundreds of fans. It was intended to remain on permanent display outside the airport's terminal entrance.

===== Reception =====
The bust received a strong reaction from news outlets and on social media following its unveiling, with commentary focused on the work's lacking resemblance to Ronaldo. Headlines described the sculpture as "bizarre", "creepy", "hideous", "horrifying", "mangled", "peculiar", "odd-looking", "scary", and "questionable". Some people used the hashtag "RonaldoBust" to share manipulated photos, or suggested conspiracy theories based on Ronaldo's football rivalries. Ronaldo did not seem bothered by the bust during the unveiling ceremony. Santos has defended his work and said that he, Ronaldo, Ronaldo's mother, and the airport chiefs who commissioned the work were happy with the final product. Santos said:

It is impossible to please the Greeks and Trojans. Neither did Jesus please everyone... This is a matter of taste, so it is not as simple as it seems. What matters is the impact that this work generated. There is always the possibility of making a difference, I was prepared for all this.

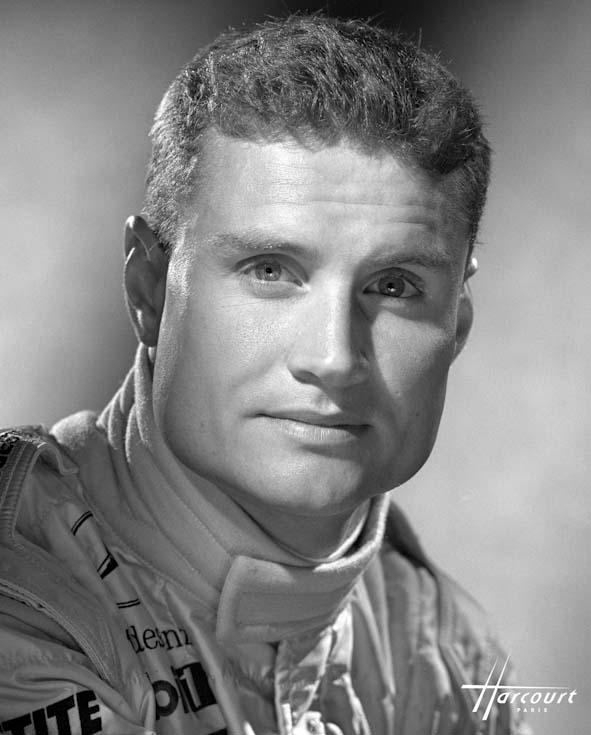
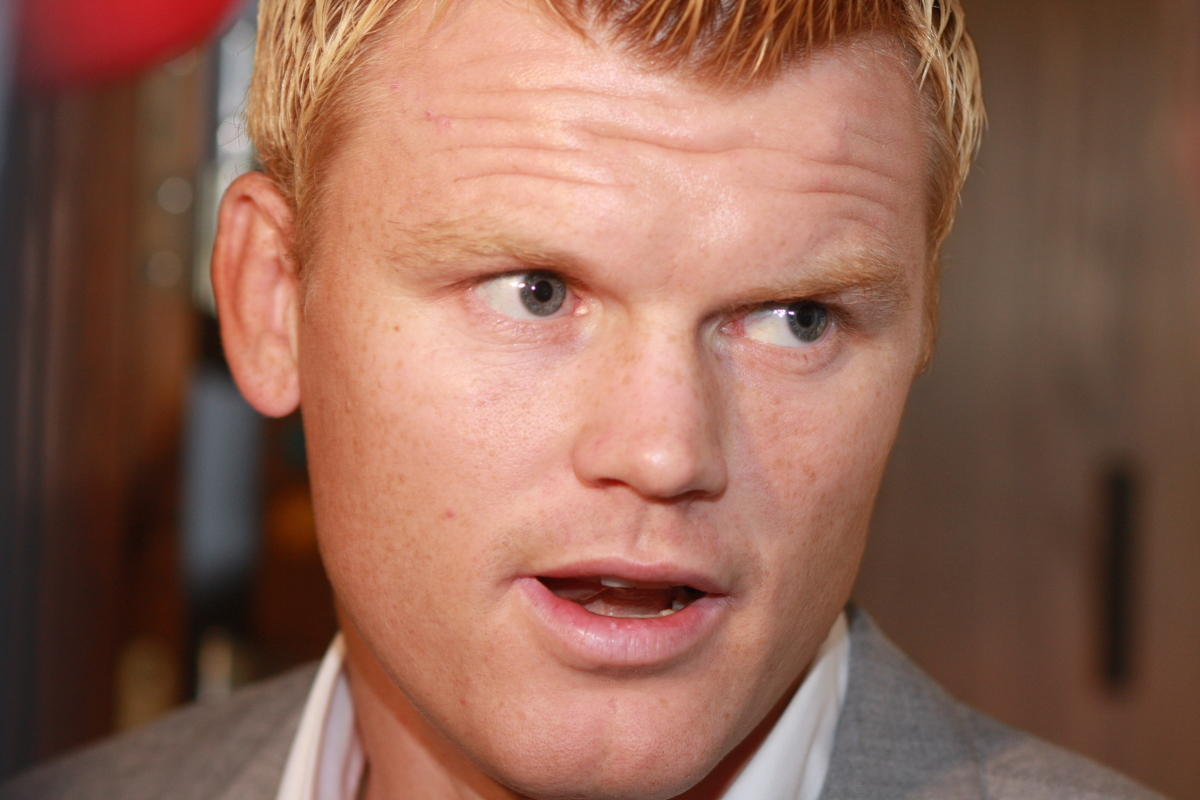
The bust drew comparisons to David Coulthard (left) and John Arne Riise (right).

Alan Dawson of Business Insider said the sculpture looked like a grown-up version of Alfred E. Neuman, the fictitious mascot and cover boy of the American magazine, Mad. CNET's Alfred Ng called the bust "ugly" and made Ronaldo a "laughingstock" of Twitter. Furthermore, he questioned how the "bronze abomination [could] become a reality" and said the sculpture "looks as if Ronaldo had slammed his face into the ground multiple times". Finally, Ng quipped, "Here's hoping the replacement bust of Ronaldo won't be as terrifying as the original." Hayley Jones of The Daily Beast said fans were "thrown for a loop", the sculpture's "vaguely menacing visage now sneers at passersby", and quipped, "Bronzing never ends well for anyone."

The Daily Telegraph's Sean Gibson suggested that Ronaldo, "who prides himself so much on his winsome complexion cannot be best pleased with this particular artist's impression of him", but noted that he and his fans seemed pleased at the ceremony. The Guardian's Elle Hunt said the bust resembles Kryten from the British comedy franchise Red Dwarf, and the botched Ecce Homo restoration. Hindustan Times said the bronze has a "toothy grin and bulging eyes that instantly created a laugh on social media because of its debatable likeness". The Independent described the artwork as "amusing" and "scary", and compared its "disconcertingly lopsided grin" to "The Head" from the British children's television series Art Attack as well as Raoul Moat. Tom Doyle of London Evening Standard called the bust a "bizarre", "troll face" statue that "delighted and horrified Twitter in equal measure".

The Mercury News said Ronaldo was "upstaged" by his own bust, which "hardly does the handsome footballer justice". The newspaper compared the bronze to one of Lucille Ball installed in Celoron, New York, nicknamed Scary Lucy, and furthermore said of Ronaldo's bronze: "It squashes his eyes close together, and the cheeky raised-eyebrow smile more resembles a leer. The face is also unusually chubby, in contrast to Ronaldo's chiseled looks. NPR's Colin Dwyer also compared the bust of Ronaldo to Scary Lucy. Joe Prince-Wright of NBC Sports called the work "horrendous". New York Daily News' Brett Bodner said the bust is "kind of creepy", "looks nothing like Ronaldo", and reported that "the internet could't help but make fun of how bad the statue looks". Victor Mather of The New York Times described the sculpture's "goofy smirk and uneven eyes", suggested it resembled Latvian basketball player Kristaps Porziņģis, and wrote, "Most art connoisseurs out there were not impressed".

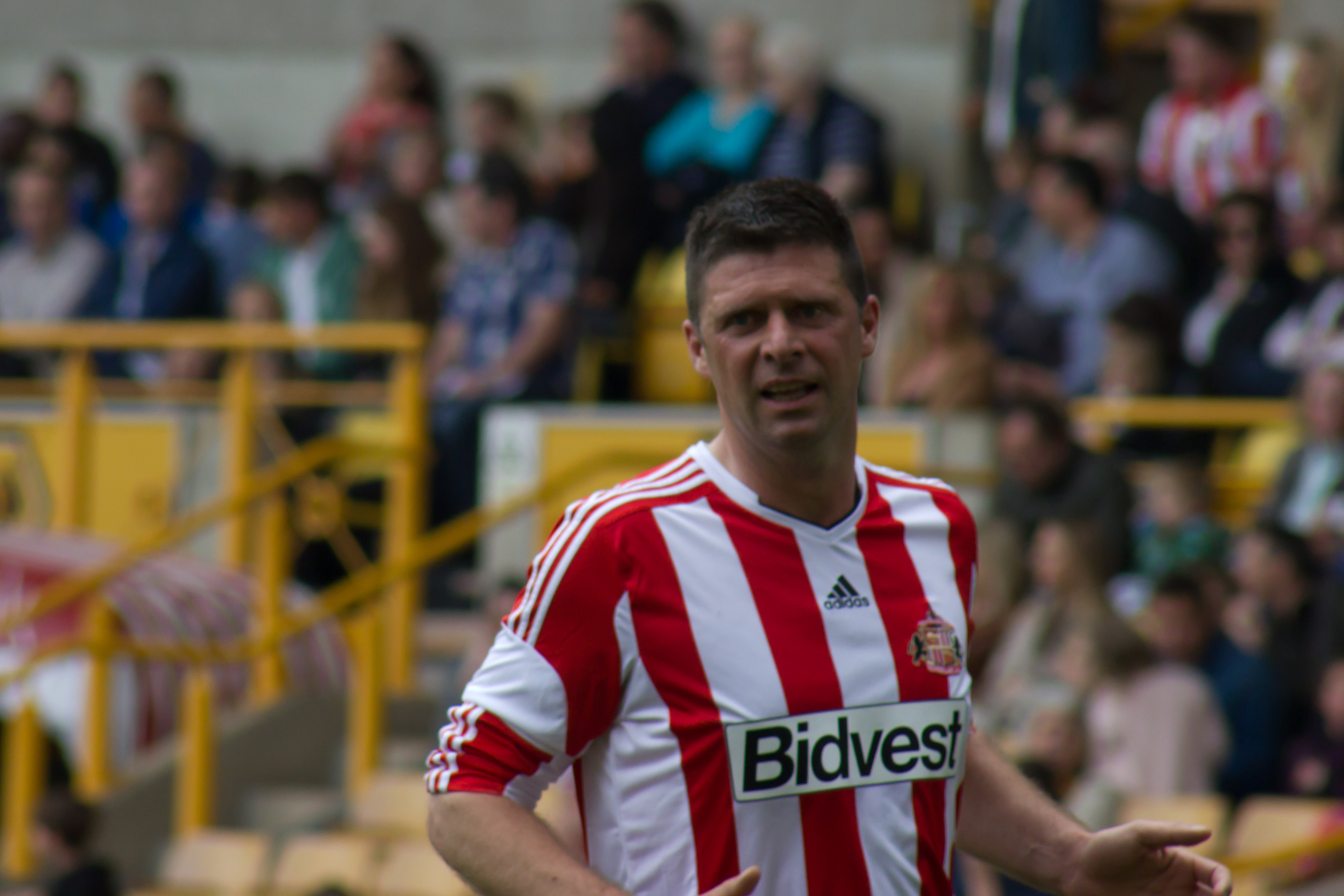
The sculpture was said to resemble Irish former professional footballer and businessman Niall Quinn (pictured in 2014), among many other comparisons.

Claire McCartney of the magazine Paper wrote, "despite Ronaldo's world-renowned beauty and famously symmetrical face, the statue Portugal created of him was...questionable. I mean, truly, the stuff of nightmares. Perhaps the sculptor was drunk, or high, or even a little bit jealous and decided to mold Ronaldo's face into swirly obscurity. No matter the reason, the result is horrifying." People magazine's Brianne Tracy said the work "looks nothing like" Ronaldo and used word play to describe the sculpture as "well, a bust". Raisa Bruner of Time magazine said the sculpture is "bizarre", "questionable", and generated "plenty of jokes, memes, and head-shaking". USA Today's Charles Curtis also used a pun to describe the artwork as "a bust". He called the sculpture "pretty creepy" and compared the depiction of Ronaldo to the courtroom sketch of Tom Brady, which received a similar reaction in 2015.

Rich McCormick of The Verge wrote, "The finished product makes the famously handsome man into something of a monster, squaring his head, shrinking his eyes, and inflating his bones to horrific levels. It looks like someone having a bad reaction to hair dye, or like The Goonies' Sloth after some partially successful plastic surgery, and as is to be expected in these situations, the internet went wild." McCormick also noted the many photoshopped parodies that appeared online, depicting Ronaldo as "Batman's Two-Face, Mass Effect's eerily animated main character, Han Solo frozen in carbonite, BioShock's Andrew Ryan, and as IT, the monster hiding in the sewers. Others went the other way, mapping the unheimlich contours of the bust's face onto the real man's real face, making his head lumpen and his eyes scream 'kill me.'"

The sculpture has also been said to depict Irish former professional footballer and businessman Niall Quinn.

==== Second bust ====
External videos
- Sculptor of Infamous Cristiano Ronaldo Bust Gets Shot at Redemption on YouTube (29 March 2018), Bleacher Report

In 2018, Bleacher Report commissioned Santos to create a "more traditional interpretation" bust of Ronaldo with a "more serious" demeanor. The original sculpture will continue to be displayed at Cristiano Ronaldo International Airport. Santos has said the reception his first bust received had a negative impact on him and his family. He completed work on the sculpture in March. Santos' reaction to seeing the bust for the first time was released by Bleacher Report, on the one year anniversary of the original sculpture's unveiling.

The sports website published a documentary video about Santos, in which he said: "The first Ronaldo bust, if I hadn't done it the way I did, it would've already been forgotten a long time ago. So, sometimes it's necessary to have a certain bravery to go against the usual and have an impact. Because even though there are people who mock and make negative comments, there are still many people who value it. And what I've learned through all this time is that no matter how few people can see the positive side of the work, they are enough to give us strength." Santos also said he remains proud of the original bust.

Diario AS said "the new bust far more loyal to reality", and entertainment.ie said "the finished product is altogether more acceptable. We dare say that even the man himself might grudgingly accept the likeness this time." ESPN's Chris Wright wrote, "The second bust is undoubtedly a lot more polished and lifelike, though it also lacks the naive charm of the wonky original." Tom Doyle of London Evening Standard called the bust "brilliant" and "impressive".

Following the 2021 installation of the statue of Diana, Princess of Wales at London's Kensington Palace, Ron McKay of The Herald said the sculpture was "nearly, but not quite" as "awful" as the bust of Ronaldo at Madeira Airport, which he said "looked more like The Head from Art Attack than the footballer". McKay wrote, "A second attempt by sculptor Emanuel Santos was little better – it was bland, but at least it resembled a human, just not Ronaldo."

=== Bust of Gareth Bale ===
In 2017, the Irish bookmaker Paddy Power commissioned Santos to make a bust of Ronaldo's then team-mate, the Welsh footballer Gareth Bale. The bust was unveiled in Cardiff before the 2017 UEFA Champions League Final at the city's Millennium Stadium. The bust was valued at approximately £25,000 and weighs 40 kg. It was made in Porto, Portugal, and took 264 hours to create.
