= Aero Design DG-1 =

DG-1

General information
- Type: Homebuilt Racing aircraft
- National origin: United States
- Manufacturer: Aero Design Associates
- Designer: David Garber
- Number built: 1

History
- First flight: 1977

The Aero Design DG-1 (registered N10E) is an American racing aircraft designed by David Garber in an attempt to break the world airspeed record for a piston-engined aircraft. It is a single-seat aircraft with two Mazda RX-3 engines installed, one driving a tractor propeller, the other driving a pusher. The fuselage is bullet-shaped and highly streamlined and features a mid-wing and cruciform tail. It first flew on 25 July 1977.

After being displayed at the Sun 'n Fun air museum at Lakeland, Florida for some years, the aircraft was being offered for sale in 2005 with an asking price of US$125,000.

== Specifications (Aero Design DG-1) ==
Data from Plane and Pilot.

General characteristics

- Crew: 1
- Length: 20 ft 0 in (6.0 m)
- Wingspan: 20 ft 6 in (6.2 m)
- Wing area: 52.95 sq ft (4.92 m^{2})
- Empty weight: 1,700 lb (771 kg)
- Gross weight: 2,506 lb (1,137 kg)
- Powerplant: 2 × Mazda RX-3 Wankel rotary engines , 330 hp (240 kW) each

Performance

- Maximum speed: 450 mph (720 km/h, 390 kn)
- Cruise speed: 351 mph (565 km/h, 305 kn)
- Range: 460 mi (740 km, 400 nmi)
- Service ceiling: 24,000 ft (7,300 m)
- Rate of climb: 3,000 ft/min (15 m/s)
