= Japan Air Lines Flight 715 =

1977 aviation accident

Coordinates: 03°07′52″N 101°32′53″E

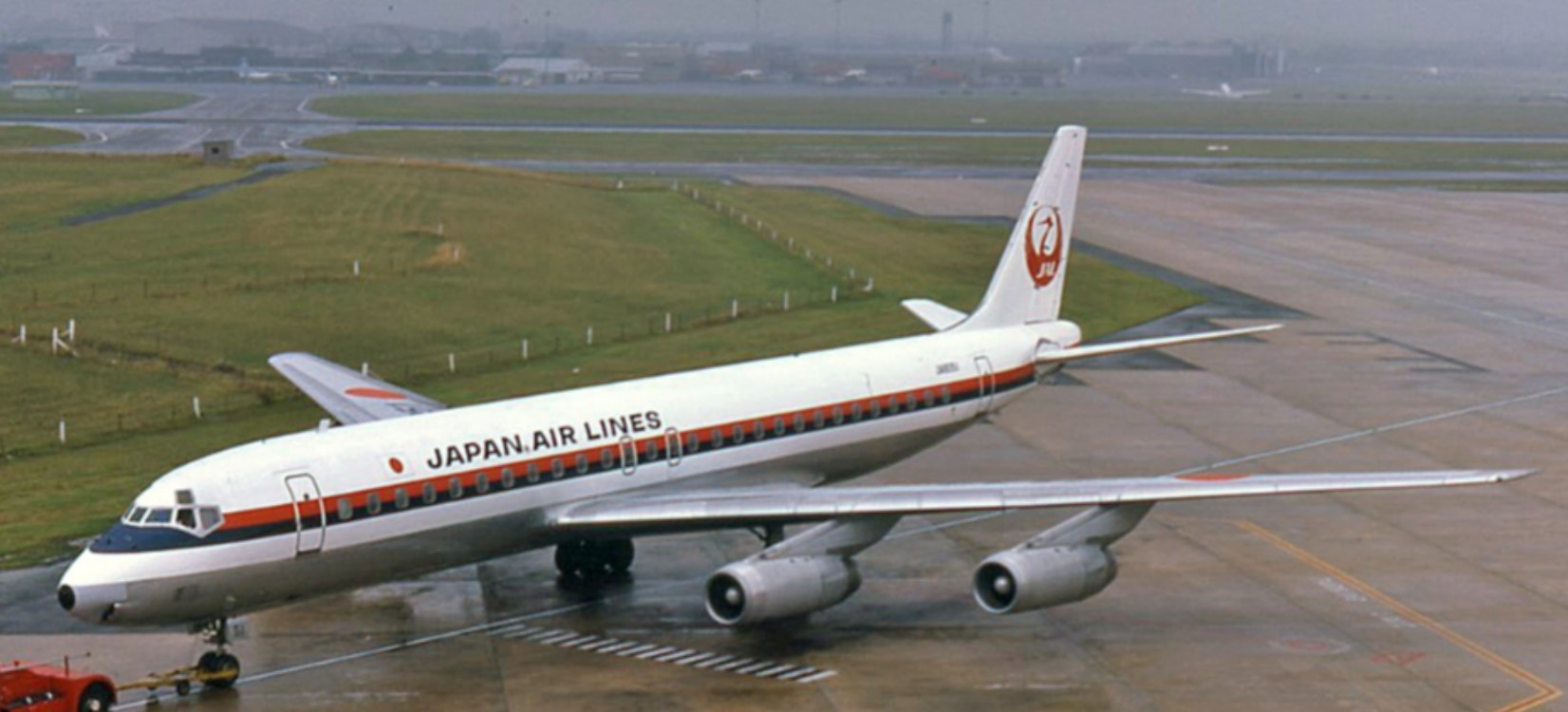
- JA8051, the aircraft involved in the accident, pictured in March 1977

Occurrence
- Date: 27 September 1977
- Summary: Controlled flight into terrain due to pilot error
- Site: Elmina Estate, near Subang Airport, Selangor, Malaysia

Aircraft
- Aircraft type: McDonnell Douglas DC-8-62H
- Operator: Japan Air Lines
- Registration: JA8051
- Flight origin: Tokyo International Airport, Tokyo, Japan
- 1st stopover: Kai Tak Airport, Hong Kong
- Last stopover: Subang Airport, Selangor, Malaysia
- Destination: Singapore International Airport, Singapore
- Occupants: 79
- Passengers: 69
- Crew: 10
- Fatalities: 34
- Injuries: 45
- Survivors: 45

Japan Air Lines Flight 715 was a regular scheduled flight that crashed on approach to Subang Airport in Malaysia on 27 September 1977. The aircraft was a McDonnell Douglas DC-8, registration JA8051, on a flight from Haneda Airport in Tokyo, to Singapore, with stopovers at Hong Kong, and Subang Airport, Malaysia. Of the 69 passengers and ten crew on board, 34 died, whilst the other 45 survived with injuries. It was the second-deadliest aviation disaster to occur in Malaysia at the time.

== Aircraft ==
The aircraft involved was a McDonnell Douglas DC-8-62H manufactured in 1971, and delivered to Japan Air Lines on 23 August. It was registered as JA8051. The aircraft was powered by four Pratt & Whitney JT3D-3B turbofan engines.

== Accident ==
Two hours into the flight, air traffic control at Subang Airport told flight 715 to start its approach and land on runway 15. The flight crew started their approach, putting the landing gear down and extending the flaps. The aircraft descended below minimum descent altitude of 750 feet (230 m), then at 300 feet (91 m), it crashed into the side of a hill 4 miles (3.5 nmi; 6.4 km) from the airport, near the Elmina Estate. The aircraft broke on impact, and a fire erupted, which was extinguished by airport rescue and firefighting.

The accident killed 34 people: eight of the 10 crew and 26 of the 69 passengers. Forty-five survivors, among the passengers and crew, were taken to a hospital. The remains from the crash could be found in the soil surrounding the estate until 2011. Most of the land now is being converted to developments.

A memorial was built in the Japanese cemetery in Kuala Lumpur.

The crash was the second-deadliest aviation disaster to occur in Malaysia until the crash of Malaysian Airline System Flight 653, two months later, with 100 fatalities.

== Investigation ==
The Malaysian Department of Civil Aviation investigated the accident. At the time of the crash, the weather around the airport was poor and the aircraft was on a VOR approach. The investigation determined that the cause of the accident was the captain descending below the minimum descent altitude without having the runway in sight, and continuing the descent, causing the aircraft to crash before reaching the airport. The flight crew loss of sight of the airport due to bad weather, which also contributed to the accident. In addition, the first officer did not challenge the captain for violating the regulations.

== See also ==
- Elmina plane crash, happened in the same area 46 years later
- Malaysian Airline System Flight 653, another plane crash in Malaysia that happened three months later
