= Start + Flug Globetrotter =

German two-seat glider, 1977

Globetrotter

General information
- Type: Side-by-side training glider
- National origin: Federal Republic of Germany
- Designer: Ursula Hänle and Walter Stender
- Number built: 1?

History
- First flight: 28 July 1977

The Start + Flug H-121 Globetrotter is an advanced training glider, seating two in side-by-side configuration. It was intended for production but Start + Flug ceased trading soon after the Globetrotter's first flight.

== Design and development ==
The Globetrotter was originally named the Schulmeister, reflecting its role as an advanced training glider. It was designed by Ursula Hänle and Walter Stender and is mostly constructed from glass-reinforced plastic (G.R.P.). Student and instructor sit side-by-side under a single piece canopy which opens by sliding forward over the nose. The fuselage has provision for water ballast.

It is a mid- wing monoplane with its wings, which have an Eppler E603 profile, swept forward at 2.5°. Airbrakes extend from the upper wing surfaces only. It has a T-tail and a standard, fixed glider monowheel undercarriage with a tailwheel.

== Operational history ==
The number of Globetrotters built is uncertain. One source says production began in March 1978 but another implies the company closed sometime in 1977. There is no hard evidence for the construction of other aircraft after the prototype.

The first prototype Globetrotter was later registered in the United States. No Globetrotters remained on the European civil registers in 2010.

== Specifications ==
Data from Hardy 1982.

General characteristics

- Crew: Two
- Length: 7.66 m (25 ft 2 in)
- Wingspan: 17.00 m (55 ft 9 in)
- Height: 1.06 m (3 ft 6 in)
- Wing area: 15.80 m^{2} (170.1 sq ft)
- Aspect ratio: 18.3
- Airfoil: Eppler E 603
- Empty weight: 290 kg (639 lb)
- Max takeoff weight: 500 kg (1,102 lb)

Performance

- Maximum speed: 249 km/h (155 mph, 135 kn)
- Maximum glide ratio: maximum 36:1 at 100 km/h (62 mph; 54 kn
- Rate of sink: 0.65 m/s (128 ft/min) at 81 km/h (50 mph; 44 kn)
