= TAP Flight 425 =

1977 aviation accident

Transportes Aéreos Portugueses Flight 425
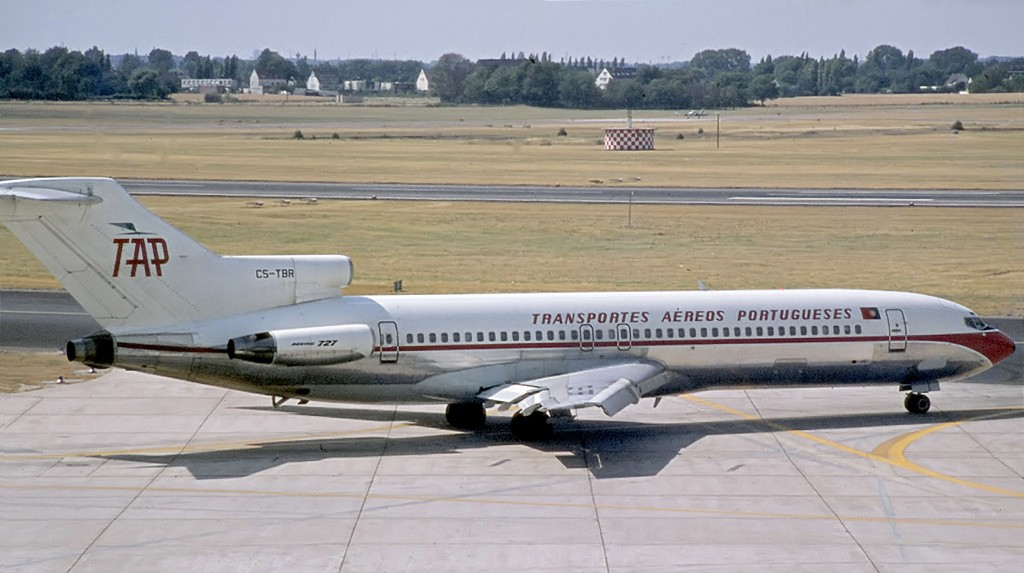
- CS-TBR, the aircraft involved, seen at Düsseldorf Airport, three months prior to the accident

Accident
- Date: 19 November 1977
- Summary: Runway overrun
- Site: Madeira Airport, Funchal, Portugal; 32°41′17″N 16°47′8″W

Aircraft
- Aircraft type: Boeing 727-282 Advanced
- Aircraft name: Sacadura Cabral
- Operator: Transportes Aéreos Portugueses
- IATA flight No.: TP425
- ICAO flight No.: TAP425
- Call sign: TAP 425
- Registration: CS-TBR
- Flight origin: Brussels Airport, Belgium
- Stopover: Lisbon Airport, Portugal
- Destination: Madeira Airport, Funchal, Portugal
- Occupants: 164
- Passengers: 156
- Crew: 8
- Fatalities: 131
- Injuries: 33
- Survivors: 33

TAP Flight 425 was a regular scheduled flight from Brussels, Belgium, to Santa Catarina Airport (informally known as Funchal Airport or Madeira Airport; now the Cristiano Ronaldo International Airport), Portugal, with an intermediate scheduled stop in Lisbon. On 19 November 1977, the Boeing 727 operating the service overran the airport's runway before crashing onto the nearby beach and exploding, killing 131 of the 164 people on board.

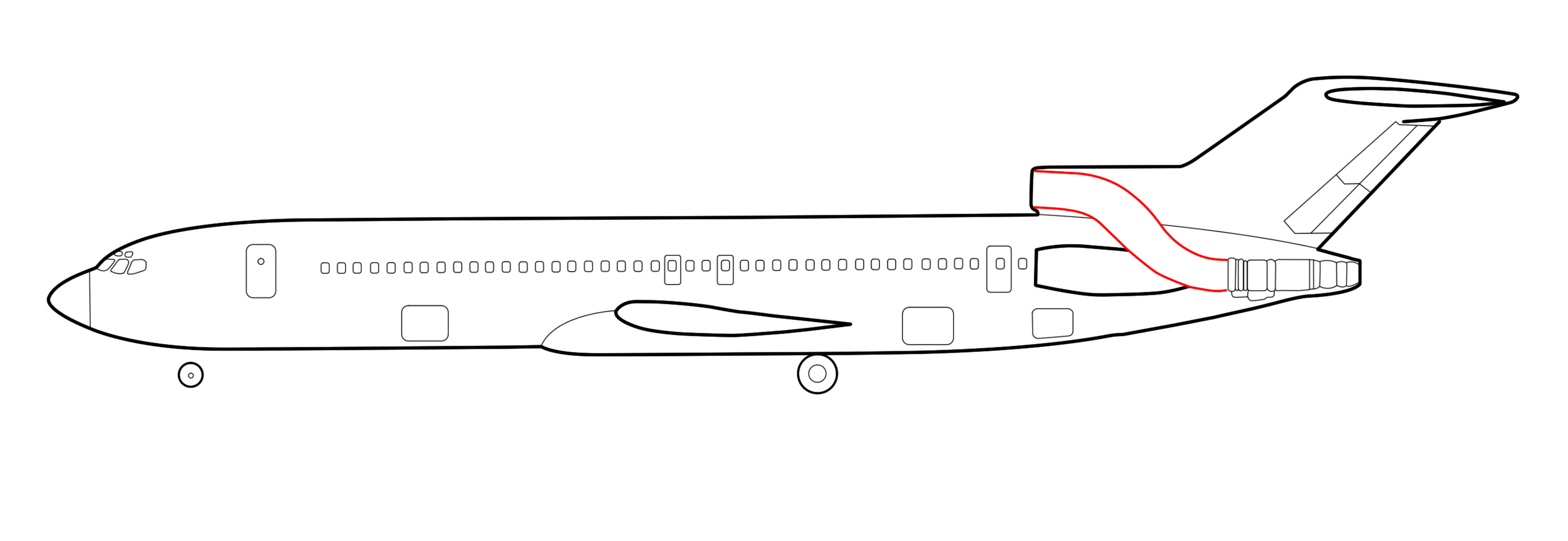
Diagram of the Boeing 727 (with engine 2 S-duct in red)

== Background ==
=== Aircraft ===
The aircraft involved was a Boeing 727-282 Advanced with aircraft registration CS-TBR, and named after the Portuguese aviation pioneer Sacadura Cabral. It was delivered to TAP on 21 January 1975. It was powered by three Pratt & Whitney JT8D-17 turbofan engines which had a maximum thrust of 16,000 pounds-force (71 kN) each. The aircraft had completed a B check on 21 September 1977, and at the time of the accident had accumulated 6,154 flying hours in 5,204 cycles.

=== Crew ===
The crew consisted of Captain João Lontrão, First Officer Miguel Guimarães Leal, and Flight Engineer Gualdino Pinto, as well as five flight attendants. There were 156 passengers on board.

== Accident ==
On 19 November 1977, the aircraft operated flights TP420 Lisbon-Brussels, and then Flight TP425 Brussels-Funchal with a stopover in Lisbon. Flight 420 and the first leg of Flight 425 were completed without any issues reported. In Lisbon, the crew received a weather report for Funchal. According to the forecast, severe weather was expected en route, with a chance of thunderstorm cumulus and torrential rain, but this was not expected to affect the flight.

Flight 425 left the gate at 7:50pm and took off from runway 03 of Lisbon Airport at 7:55pm.

At the time of the accident, the then-Santa Catarina International Airport's runway was 1,600 m (5,250 ft) long, which made landing extremely difficult.

At 9:05 pm, on the approach to Madeira, the crew of Flight TP425 requested permission to descend. The controller cleared them to descend to flight level 50 (5,000 feet or 1,524 metres) at a pressure of 1013.2 mbar. At 9:05:50, the crew reported the beginning of their descent to FL50 heading toward Porto Santo and were instructed to switch to 118.1 MHz to communicate with Funchal control. At 9:17pm, the crew contacted air traffic control in Funchal and reported reaching flight level 50 and an ETA at the MAD radio beacon in five minutes. In response, the controller cleared the aircraft to descend to 3,500 feet (1,100 m) on QNH 1013 and advised that the landing would be on runway 06. The controller then transmitted a weather report: calm wind on runway 06, wind 14 knots (7 m/s; 26 km/h; 16 mph) direction 220 at nearby Rosário, temperature 19 °C (66 °F), visibility 4–5 kilometres (2.5–3.1 mi; 2.2–2.7 nmi). The crew acknowledged the transmission. According to the actual weather forecast at Funchal airport at 8:50pm, the wind speed was 10 knots (5.1 m/s; 18.5 km/h; 11.5 mph) at a heading of 220°, visibility 5 kilometres (3.1 mi; 2.7 nmi), cloud cover 7/8, rain showers, airfield pressure at runway 24 was 1006 mbar, at runway 06 - 1008 mbar, temperature 18–19 °C (64–66 °F).

At 9:23:13 pm, the crew reported passing the MAD beacon at a height of 1,700 feet (518 m) and a heading of 215°, but had no visual contact with the ground. Following a heading of 200° and descending to 980 feet, at 9:26:33 pm, flight TP425 reported no visual contact with the runway and initiated a go-around.

After two unsuccessful attempts to land the aircraft, the crew decided to make one last attempt to land before they would make the decision to divert to Gran Canaria Airport in the Canary Islands.

On the third landing attempt, Captain Lontrão selected runway 24. At 9:43:52 pm, the crew reported passing 1,800 feet (550 m) on a heading of 205°, and at 9:44:57 pm, the controller asked the crew if they had the aircraft's landing lights on, to which they responded affirmatively. At 9:45:02 pm, the crew reported passing the airport's radio beacon and visual contact with the airport. At 9:46:48 pm, while making a right turn to course 250°, Captain Lontrão gave the order to read the pre-landing checklist.

At 9:47:21 pm, the airport tower reported that the wind on runway 24 had died down and asked whether the crew would proceed with the landing. The crew responded affirmatively. The controller cleared flight 425 to land. From an altitude of 400 feet (120 m) and at an airspeed of 150 knots (280 km/h; 170 mph), the aircraft began its descent. While on final approach to runway 24 in heavy rain, strong wind, and poor visibility, the aircraft touched down 2,060 feet (630 m) beyond the threshold and started hydroplaning. With just 3,000 feet (910 m) of runway left, the crew tried desperately to stop, applying maximum reverse thrust and brakes, but the aircraft slid off the runway at a ground speed of approximately 43 knots (80 km/h; 49 mph) and plunged over a 200-foot (61 m) steep bank, hitting a nearby bridge and crashing on the beach, splitting in two and bursting into flames.

Of the 164 people aboard (156 passengers and 8 crew), 131 were killed (125 passengers and 6 crew), making it the deadliest airplane accident in Portugal to that point. As of 2023, it is the second deadliest airplane accident in Portugal, after Independent Air Flight 1851. It remains TAP Portugal's only fatal accident since the beginning of its flight operations in 1946.

== Investigation ==
According to the investigation's findings, the crew was sufficiently qualified for the flight and the aircraft was in good condition after leaving the runway until it made impact with the bridge. The report concluded that the flight crew violated the approach procedure, resulting in the aircraft touching down 2,060 feet (630 m) from the beginning of the runway, which is 1,060 feet (320 m) farther than normal, and the speed was 148.2 knots (274.5 km/h; 170.5 mph), which is 19.2 knots (35.6 km/h; 22.1 mph) above the recommended speed. It was also noted that the 1000 ft indication lights were turned off because the visual approach slope indicator (VASI) system was activated. Due to limitations in the airport's electrical installation at the time, either the VASI system or the aiming point indicator could be turned on, but not both simultaneously. Difficult weather conditions were mentioned as the immediate causes of the accident, due to aquaplaning on the runway, as well as an overshoot landing speed of 19 knots. The investigation recommended Funchal Airport to increase the level of meteorological observations.

== Aftermath ==
After the accident occurred, TAP stopped flying the Boeing 727-200 to Madeira, and started flying only the 727-100, which was 20 feet (6.1 m) shorter and took 60 fewer passengers.

The crash prompted officials to explore ways of extending the short runway. Because of the height of the runway relative to the beach below, an extension was very difficult and very expensive to perform. Between 1983 and 1986, a 200-metre (660 ft) extension was built; 14 years later, the runway was again extended. Following the 2000 extension, the runway of what is now the Cristiano Ronaldo International Airport measures 2,781 metres (9,124 ft) long and is capable of handling wide-body commercial jets like the Boeing 747 or the Airbus A340.

== See also ==
- List of accidents and incidents involving commercial aircraft
