= Madeira Airport =

International airport in Santa Cruz, Madeira, Portugal

Madeira International Airport Aeroporto Internacional da Madeira Cristiano Ronaldo

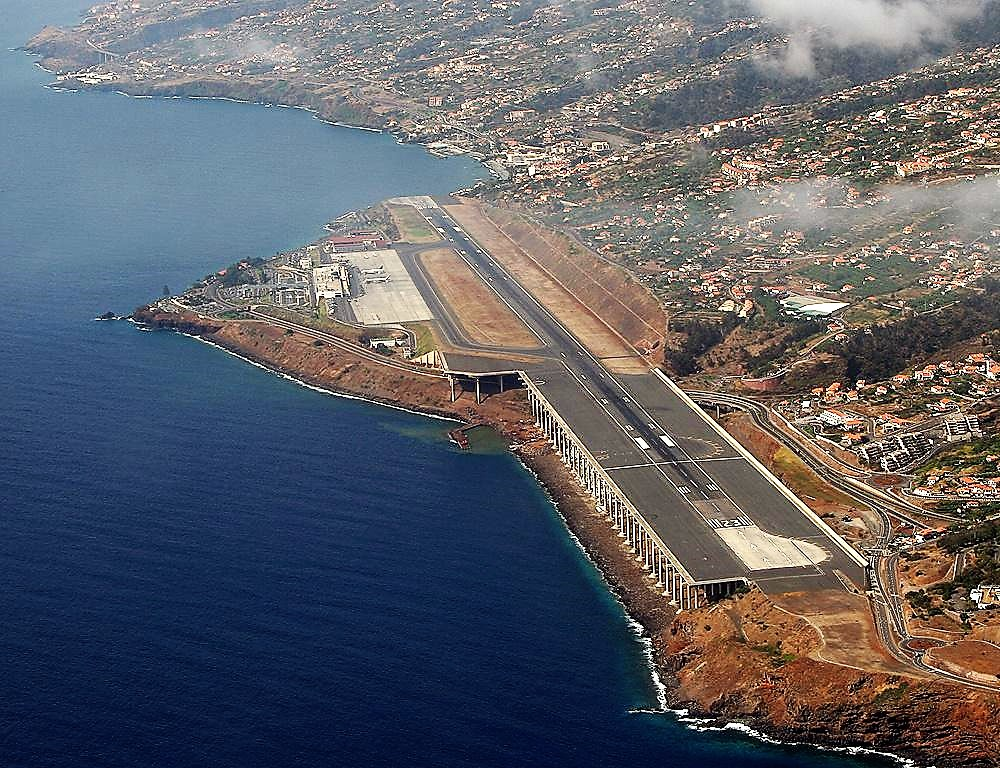
- IATA: FNC; ICAO: LPMA (previously LPFU)

Summary
- Airport type: Public
- Owner: Vinci Group
- Operator: ANA Aeroportos de Portugal
- Serves: Funchal, Madeira, Portugal
- Location: Santa Cruz
- Opened: 8 July 1964; 62 years ago
- Focus city for: TAP Air Portugal
- Operating base for: Ryanair
- Elevation AMSL: 58 m (190 ft)
- Coordinates: 32°41′39″N 16°46′41″W
- Website: www.aeroportomadeira.pt

Map
- Location in Madeira

Runways
Direction	Length		Surface
Direction	m	ft	Surface
05/23	2,781	9,124	Asphalt

Statistics (2025)
- Passengers: 5,653,000
- Passengers change 24-25: ▲12.0%
- Aircraft movements: 38,742
- Movements change 24-25: ▲12.0%
- Source: VINCI Airports

Cristiano Ronaldo International Airport (IATA: FNC, ICAO: LPMA) — also known as Madeira Airport, (Note: Portuguese: Aeroporto da Madeira) Funchal Airport, (Note: Portuguese: Aeroporto do Funchal) and formerly Santa Catarina Airport (Note: Portuguese: Aeroporto de Santa Catarina) — is an international airport in the civil parish of Santa Cruz in the Portuguese archipelago and autonomous region of Madeira. The airport is located 13.2 km (8.2 mi) east-northeast of the regional capital, Funchal. As of 2017, the airport is officially named after footballer and Madeiran native Cristiano Ronaldo.

Owing to Madeira's popularity as a leisure destination, the airport mostly hosts flights to metropolitan European destinations. It also serves a crucial role in the movement of cargo in and out of the archipelago of Madeira. It is the fourth-busiest airport in Portugal, although in January 2025 and January 2026 it took third place, surpassing Faro.

The airport is considered one of the most peculiarly perilous airports in the world due to its location and spectacular runway construction. It received the Outstanding Structure Award in 2004 from the International Association for Bridge and Structural Engineering. The History Channel programme Most Extreme Airports ranked it as the ninth most dangerous airport in the world and the third most dangerous in Europe. Pilots must undergo additional training to land at the airport. The airport suffers from frequent operational constraints due to limits on allowable wind shear.

== Geography ==
Madeira Airport is a geographically unusual airport, as it is perched on a foreland jutting out to sea. At the end of runway 05, there lie hills and cliffs which make a direct ILS approach and landing unavailable. Instead, aircraft have to make a visual approach which involves flying around the airport, then circling around in a ~180° turn before lining up on a very short final approach. The airport's runway - 05/23 - is a tabletop runway, which means there are steep dropoffs at either end of the runway - at the beginning of Runway 05, the runway drops off just before a motorway that snakes around the runway end, and at the beginning of Runway 23, which drops off a cliff. The runway is also unique in the fact that at the beginning of Runway 23, the runway is placed on a platform supported by pillars, similar to a beam bridge.

== History ==
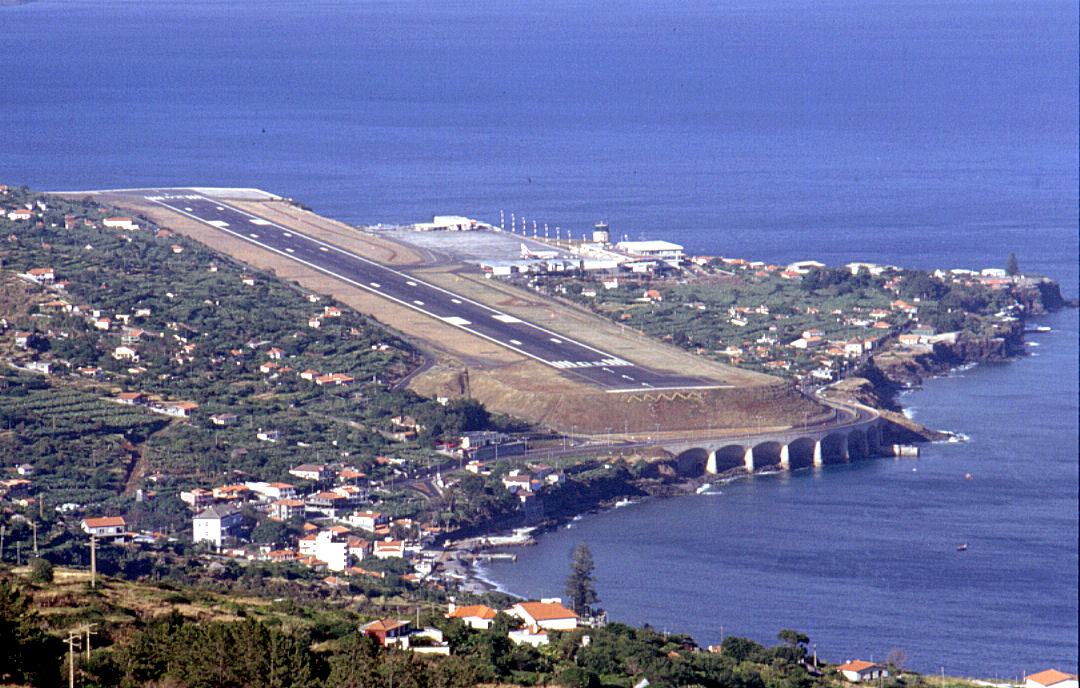
Madeira airport as seen in 1990, pre-runway extension

Madeira Airport was officially opened on 8 July 1964, with a single 1,600 m (5,200 ft) runway (06/24). The first flight to land there was a TAP Air Portugal Lockheed Constellation with 80 passengers on board.

In 1972, the popularity of visiting the island of Madeira increased, so the runway was extended to allow modern and larger aircraft to land. Considered the Kai Tak of Europe because of the unique approach to Runway 06, the decision was made to extend the existing runway instead of building a new one. The runway was extended to 1,800 m (5,900 ft), with the extension inaugurated on 1 February 1986 by the then president of the Portuguese Republic António Ramalho Eanes. In the meantime, a new terminal was built at the airport in 1973, handling 500,000 passengers.

However, as demand for tourism continued to grow, the runway was extended further. This new extension resulted in the heading of the runway being slightly adjusted and the designation being changed to 05/23. The newly extended runway—now 2,781 m (9,124 ft) long—was completed on 15 September 2000, and terminal was inaugurated on 6 October 2002. To mark the occasion, an Air Atlanta Icelandic Boeing 747-200, registration TF-ABA, landed at the airport. Although this was a rare event, some TAP Air Portugal flights on the Lisbon-Caracas-Lisbon route used to have scheduled stops at Madeira with Airbus A330-200 widebody aircraft.

=== Name change ===
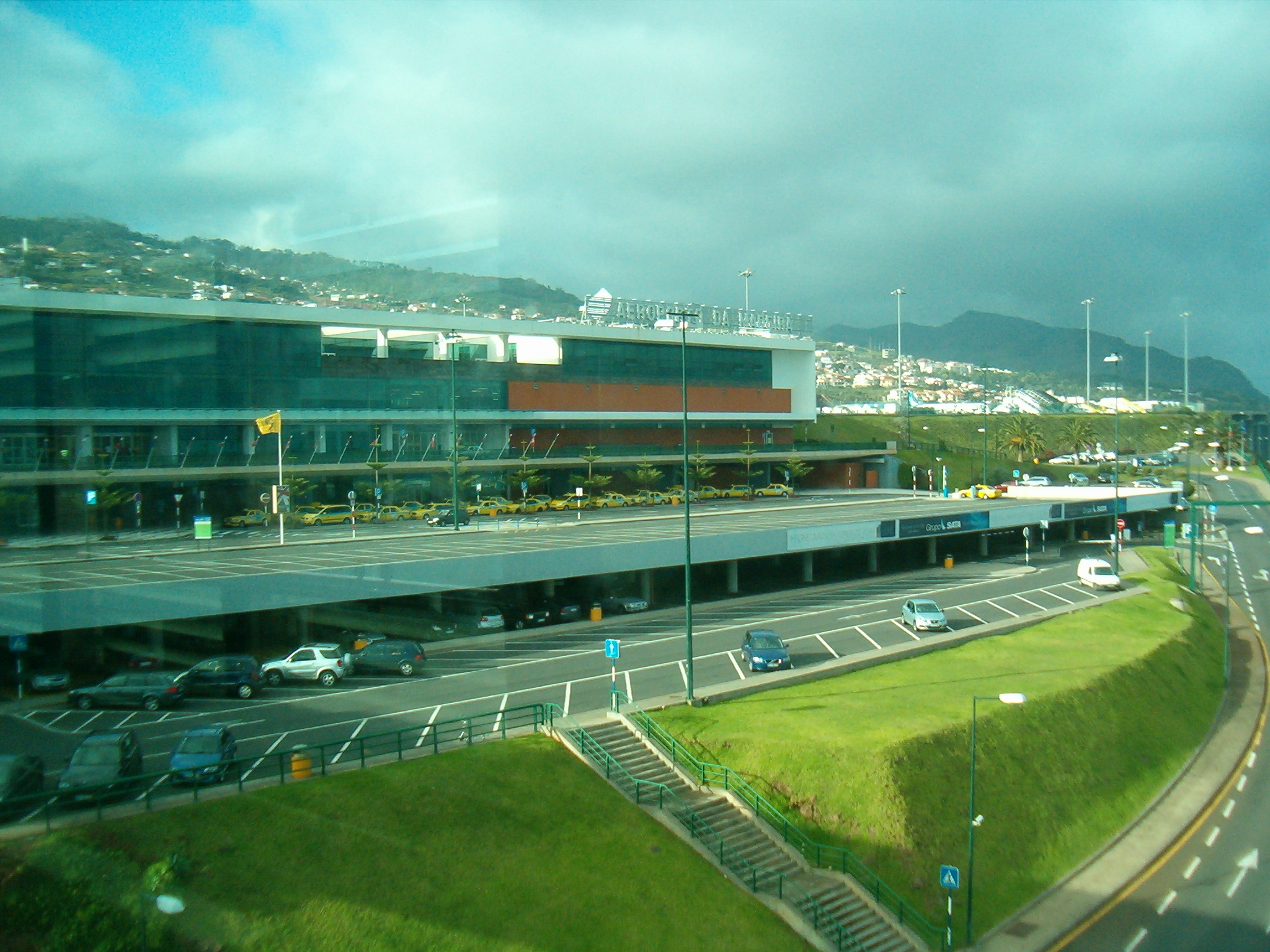
Partial view of the airport's main building

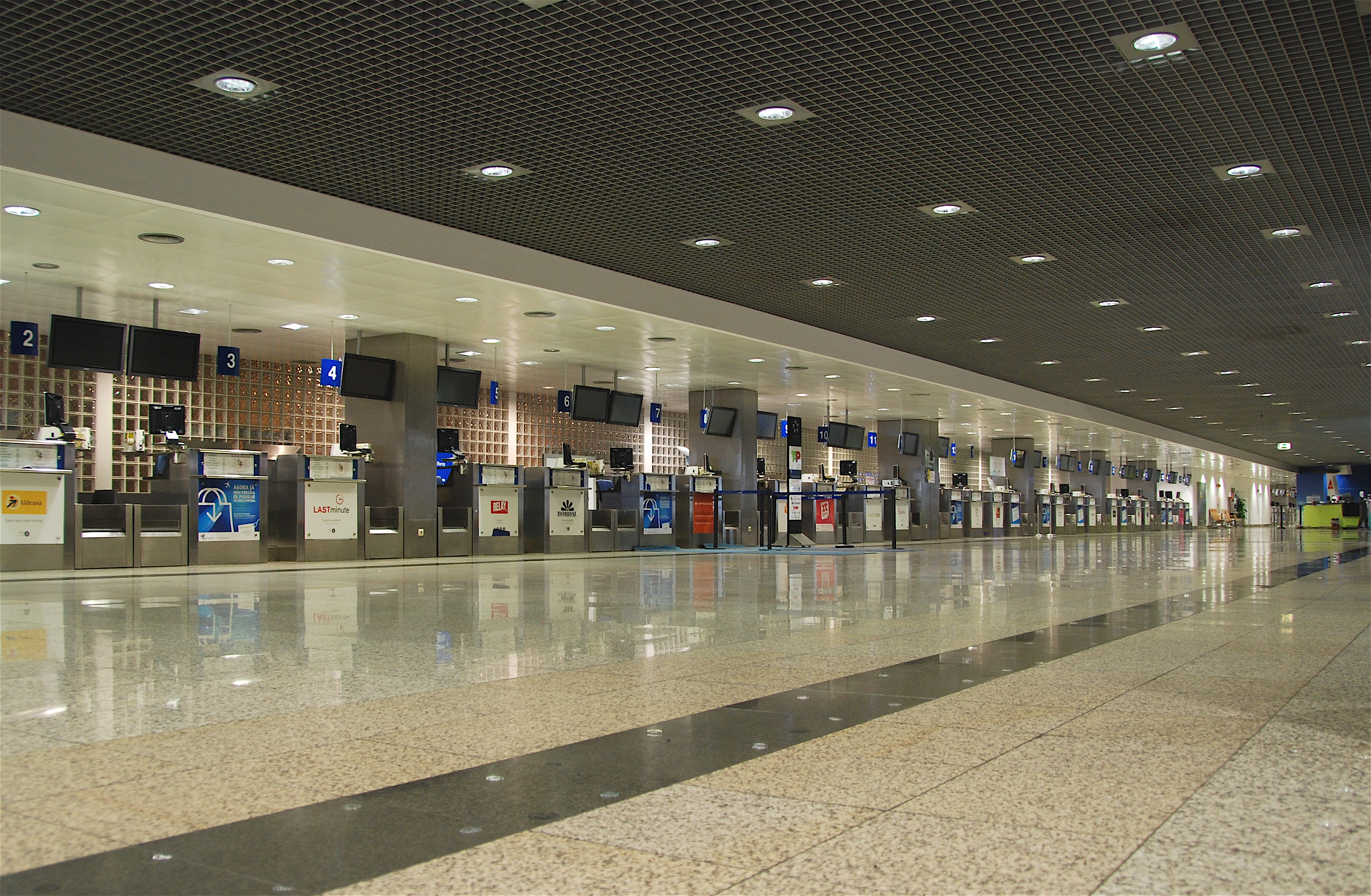
Main check-in desks hall

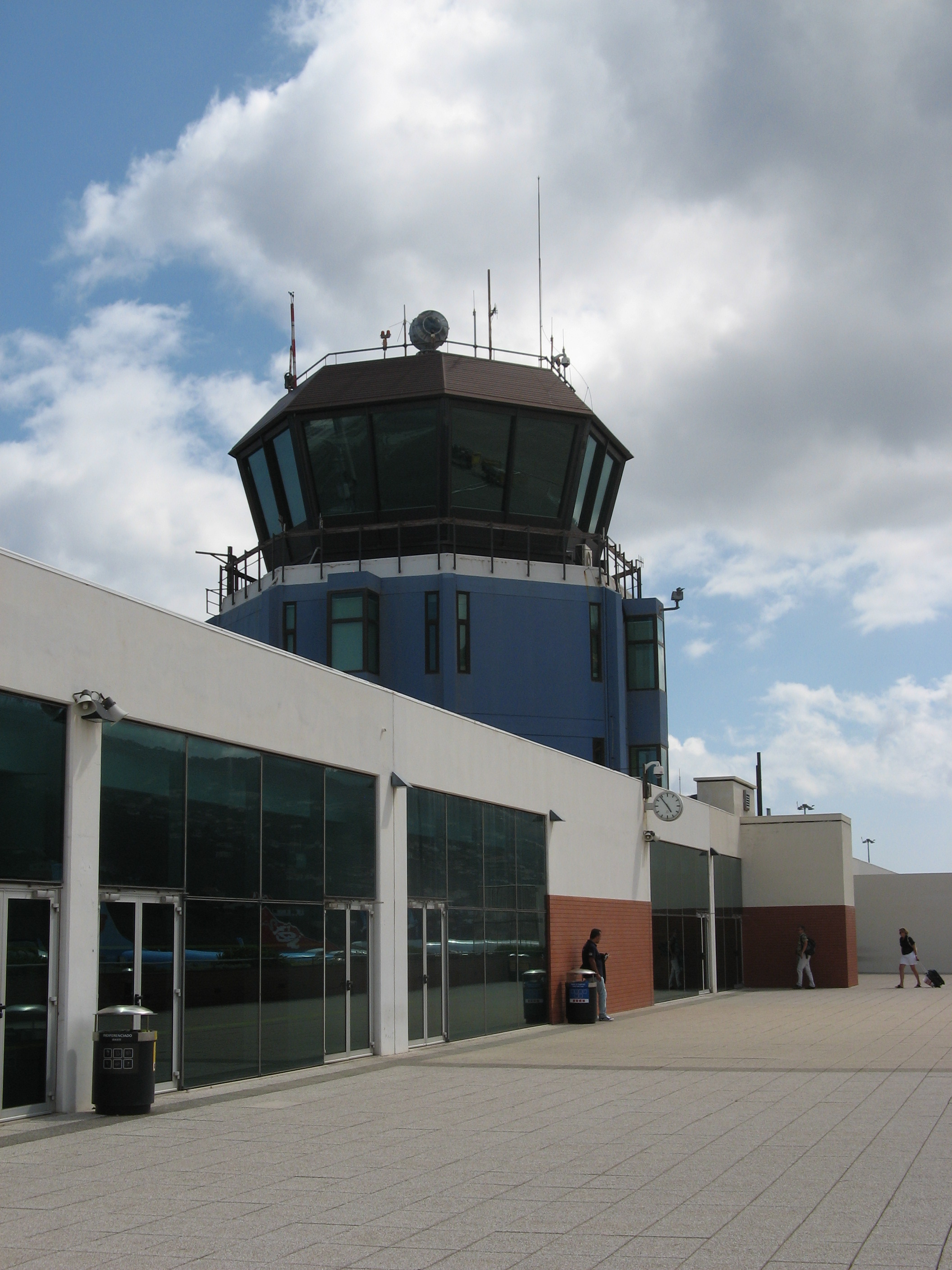
Airport tower

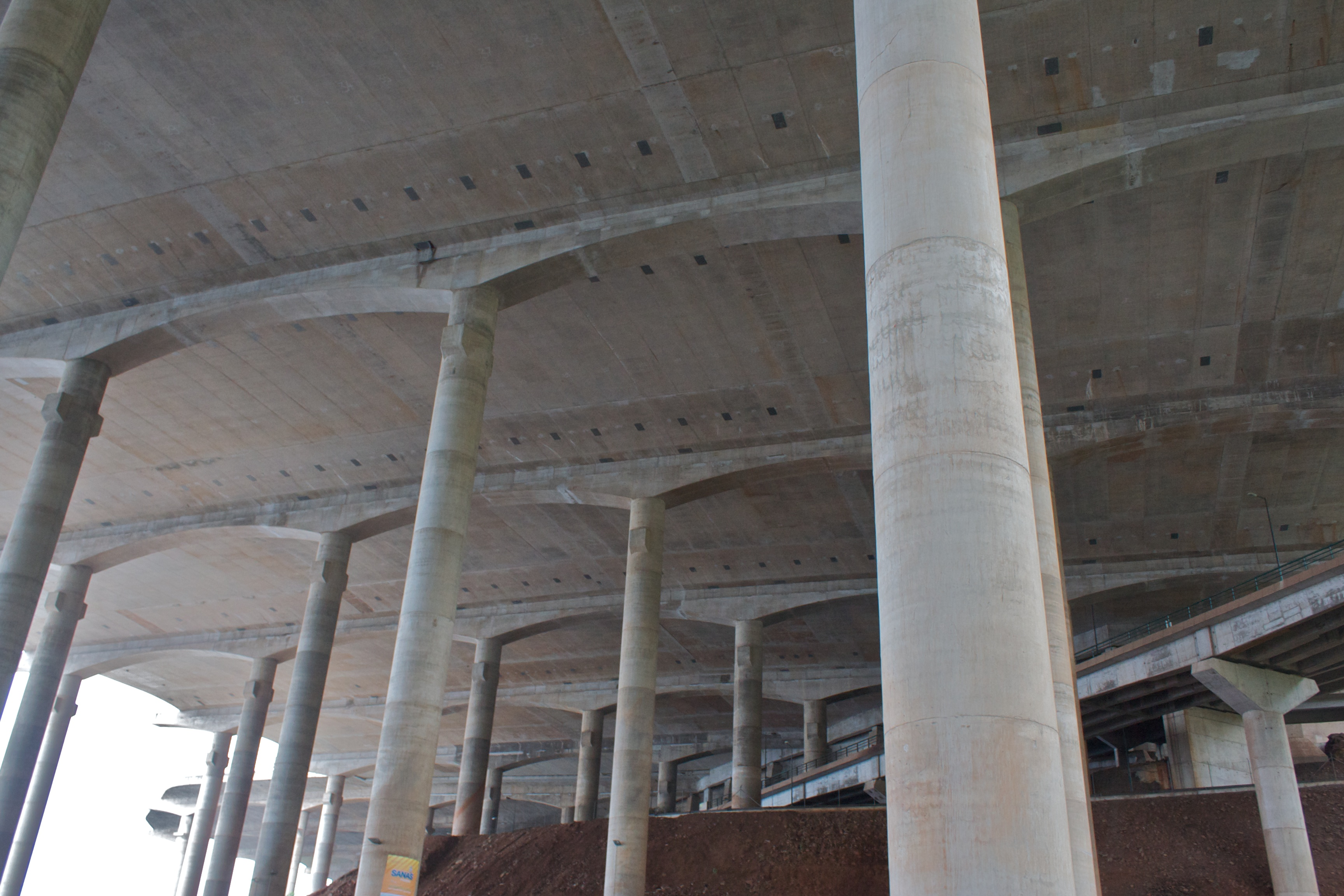
Supporting pillars under the airport runway extension

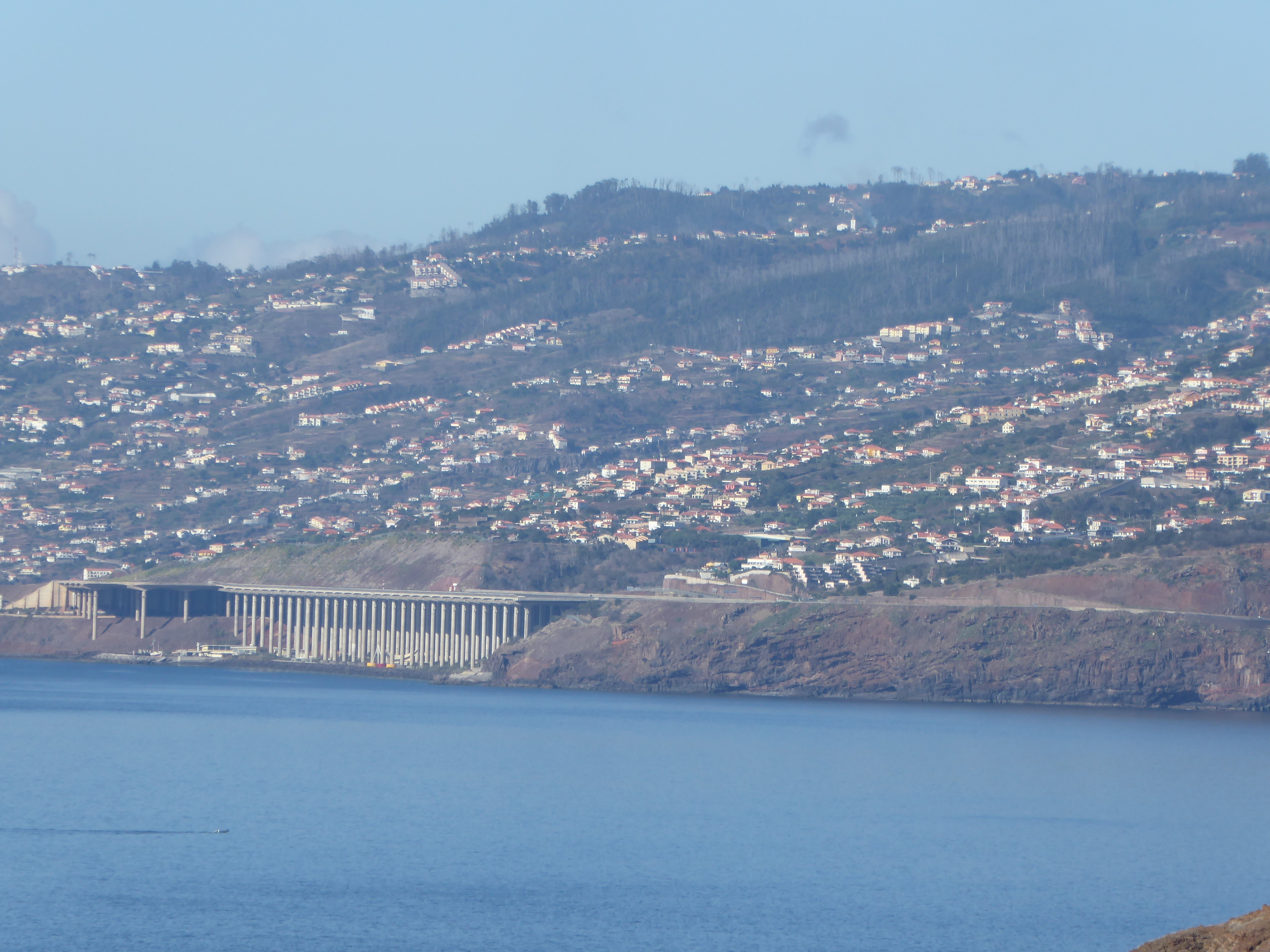
Madeira airport seen from easternmost Ponta de São Lourenço

In 2016, it was announced that the airport would be renamed Cristiano Ronaldo Madeira International Airport (Aeroporto Internacional da Madeira Cristiano Ronaldo) in honour of Madeiran native football player Cristiano Ronaldo. The rebranded terminal was unveiled on 29 March 2017, with a bust of Ronaldo also being presented.

Neither the bust nor the name change were universally well received. The design of the bust was described by some commentators as "bizarre" and ridiculed by television personalities such as Saturday Night Live character Cecilia Giminez (portrayed by comedian Kate McKinnon). The name change itself was subject to much debate and controversy locally by politicians and citizens, some of whom started a petition against the move.

A year later, sports website Bleacher Report commissioned sculptor Emanuel Santos to create another bust. However, this bust was never used; instead, a new one was made by an unnamed Spanish sculptor and unveiled to the public on 15 June 2018.

== Facilities ==
=== Runway ===
The airport was once infamous for its short runway of only 1,600 m (5,249 ft), which, surrounded by high mountains and the ocean, made it a difficult and technically demanding landing for even the most experienced pilots. Because of the ~150° right-hand turn required, the airport has acquired the nickname of "Kai Tak Airport of Europe" - a reference to the former airport of Hong Kong that also needed a right-hand turn to line up for a landing very low and close to the runway. Between 1982 and 1986, a few years after the TAP Air Portugal Flight 425 crash of 1977, Madeira's runway was extended by 200 m (656 ft) to a total of 1,800 m (5,906 ft), and four gates were opened.

In 2000, the runway was again extended, this time to 2,781 m (9,124 ft). As landfill was not a realistic option, the extension was built on a platform, partly over the ocean, supported by 180 columns, each about 70 m (230 ft) tall. The runway extension was conducted by the Brazilian construction company Andrade Gutierrez and is recognized worldwide as one of the most difficult to achieve due to the type of terrain and orography.

Its innovative solution allowed Funchal to receive the Outstanding Structure Award in 2004 by the International Association for Bridge and Structural Engineering, which aims at recognizing the most remarkable, innovative, creative, or otherwise stimulating structure completed within the last few years.

=== Terminal ===
The airport has a single terminal, which opened in 1973. The terminal has 40 check-in desks, 16 boarding gates, and 7 baggage belts. There are no air-bridges, so arriving passengers either walk the short distance to the terminal or are taken by shuttle bus. The terminal itself is mostly underground.

=== Modernisation ===
In 2016, Madeira Airport was modernised and renovated by its operator, ANA Aeroportos de Portugal, as part of an €11 million investment. The renovated terminal area, which was opened in June 2016 by the President of the Autonomous Regional Government of Madeira, Miguel Albuquerque, improved the existing facility and included a brand new shopping area, doubling the airport's overall capacity.

According to Vinci Airports, the airport will "have the capacity to deal with up to 1,400 passengers per hour", and the airport's overall new layout has been designed to accommodate new stores for national and international brands alike.

The passenger screening area, under the command of Serviço de Estrangeiros e Fronteiras, increased from 7,000 sq ft (650 m^{2}) to 16,000 sq ft (1,500 m^{2}), with more security screening lines, while the passenger holding and verification area increased from 300 to 650 m^{2}. The new layout has simplified the passenger experience, creating defined areas for the Schengen Area (which includes the Autonomous Region of Madeira) and non–Schengen Area passengers, and allows the airport operator to alternate these areas based on flight schedules. A new transfer hall and three new departure gates were also created as part of the project.

The renovation and investment project also accommodated the strengthening and re-profiling of the runway and taxiways, increasing the usable area by more than 16,000 sq ft (1,500 m^{2}).

== Airlines and destinations ==
=== Passenger ===
The following airlines operate regular scheduled passenger flights at Madeira Airport:

Airlines	Destinations
airBaltic	Riga, Tallinn
Austrian Airlines	Seasonal: Vienna
Azores Airlines	Ponta Delgada, Terceira
Binter Canarias	Porto Santo,
British Airways	London–Gatwick
Condor	Munich
Discover Airlines	Frankfurt, Munich
easyJet	Amsterdam, Basel/Mulhouse, Berlin, Bristol, Paris–Charles de Gaulle, Porto; Seasonal: Manchester, Nantes, Nice
Edelweiss Air	Zürich
Eurowings	Düsseldorf; Seasonal: Hamburg, Prague, Stuttgart
Finnair	Seasonal: Helsinki
Iberia	Madrid; Seasonal: Barcelona,
Jet2.com	Belfast–International, Bournemouth, Bristol, East Midlands, Glasgow, Leeds/Bradford, Liverpool, London–Stansted, Newcastle upon Tyne; Seasonal: London–Gatwick (begins 26 October 2026)
Luxair	Luxembourg
Ryanair	Charleroi, Dublin, Lisbon, London–Stansted, Manchester, Shannon; Seasonal: Beauvais, Milan–Malpensa
Smartwings	Seasonal: Prague
TAP Air Portugal	Faro, Lisbon
Transavia	Amsterdam, Nantes, Porto
TUI Airways	Seasonal: Birmingham
TUI fly Deutschland	Düsseldorf, Hannover, Stuttgart
TUI fly Netherlands	Seasonal: Amsterdam
United Airlines	Seasonal: Newark
Wizz Air	Budapest, Gdańsk

=== Cargo ===
Airlines	Destinations
Swiftair	Lisbon

== Statistics ==
Busiest routes from Madeira Airport (2023)
Rank	City, airport	Passengers	% change from 2019	Top carriers
1	Lisbon	1,351,694	▲33.9%	easyJet, TAP Air Portugal
2	Porto	626,892	▲76.7%	easyJet, TAP Air Portugal
3	London-Gatwick	206,505	▼20.9%	easyJet, TUI Airways
4	Manchester	159,015	▲54.8%	easyJet, Jet2.com, TUI Airways
5	London–Stansted	136,640	▲125.8%	Jet2.com
6	Frankfurt	118,371	▲24.1%	Condor, Lufthansa, TUI fly Deutschland
7	Amsterdam	102,463	▲21.2%	easyJet, Transavia, TUI fly Netherlands
8	Düsseldorf	102,261	▲28.3%	Condor, TUI fly Deutschland
9	Warsaw Chopin	89,097	▲105.1%	Wizz Air
10	London Heathrow	87,540	—N/a	British Airways

== Accidents and incidents ==
- On 5 March 1973, an Aviaco Sud Caravelle 10R (registration EC-BID) crashed into the sea during the landing approach, resulting in the loss of the aircraft and three crew.
- On 19 November 1977, TAP Air Portugal Flight 425, a Boeing 727-200 (registration CS-TBR), was travelling from Brussels to Madeira via Lisbon. After a go-around, the aircraft attempted to land in poor weather conditions. It landed long on runway 24 (now runway 23) and plunged over a steep bank. It then struck a stone bridge, and the right-wing was torn off, and then it crashed hard onto a beach. A fire broke out, setting the aircraft alight. Out of the 164 on board, 131 lost their lives.
- On 18 December 1977, SA de Transport Aérien Flight 730, a Sud Caravelle 10R (registration HB-ICK), was cleared for approach on runway 06 (now runway 05), but descended below 720 ft (220 m), causing the aircraft to crash into the sea. 36 people of the 57 on board died.
- On 11 September 2003 a Beechcraft B200 (registration N600BV) carrying a UK pilot and nine Spanish passengers crashed into the sea shortly after taking off from the airport. All occupants died.
