= Elmina Estate =

Oil palm plantation in Selangor, Malaysia

- Industry: Agriculture
- Headquarters: Malaysia

Elmina Estate (Ladang Elmina in the Malaysian language) is an oil palm plantation in Petaling District, Selangor, Malaysia. It is currently owned and operated by Sime Darby Berhad.

== History ==
Established in 1917 shortly after the nearby Tennamaram Estate, Elmina Estate is the second-oldest oil palm plantation in Malaysia. The Selangor Oil Palm Company Ltd. of Edinburgh, Scotland purchased the 3,407 acres (13,790,000 m^{2}) estate in 1923 and opened a new oil palm factory there in 1927. Beginning in the 1930s, it was a site for oil palm breeding experiments that contributed significantly to the selection of modern planting material. Kumpulan Guthrie Berhad owned the estate as of 2006, just prior to their 2007 merger with Sime Darby. Inside the estate is also the crash site of a Japan Air Lines (JAL) flight that was arriving into Subang Airport.

It has since been developed by Sime Darby Properties into Elmina City, a satellite suburb suburb of KL
