= Issoire Iris =

Single seat French glider, 1977

D 77 Iris

General information
- Type: Sailplane
- National origin: France
- Manufacturer: Siren, CERVA, Issoire

History
- First flight: 26 February 1977

The Issoire Iris was a sailplane produced in France in the early 1980s. It was a conventional, single-seat mid-wing design of fibreglass construction intended to be easy to fly for the novice pilot. Originally designed with a T-tail, the Iris was produced with a conventional, low-set tailplane.

The prototype made its first public appearance at the 1977 Paris Air Show and completed flight testing with the CEV early the following year, with certification expected to follow shortly thereafter.

== Specifications ==
General characteristics

- Crew: One pilot
- Length: 6.37 m (20 ft 11 in)
- Wingspan: 13.50 m (44 ft 4 in)
- Height: 1.20 m (3 ft 11 in)
- Wing area: 11.4 m^{2} (123 sq ft)
- Empty weight: 220 kg (445 lb)
- Gross weight: 330 kg (727 lb)

Performance

- Maximum speed: 232 km/h (145 mph, 126 kn)
- Maximum glide ratio: 33
- Rate of sink: 0.70 m/s (140 ft/min)
