= ABS Aircraft =

Swiss aircraft manufacturer

ABS Aircraft AG is a Swiss aircraft manufacturer, building Fournier-designed motorgliders. It was founded in Küsnacht (ZH) in 1985.
