= List of University of Texas at Dallas people =

The University of Texas at Dallas (also referred to as UT Dallas or UTD) is a public research university in the University of Texas System. The main campus is in the heart of the Richardson, Texas, Telecom Corridor, 18 miles north of downtown Dallas. UT Dallas people includes an Antarctic explorer, an astronaut, members of the National Academies, four Nobel laureates, a writer and folklorist, a member of India's Parliament, the founder of the world's first molecular nanotechnology company and others who have achieved prominent careers in business, government, engineering, science, medicine, the arts, and education.

== Faculty ==
Distinguished faculty include but are not limited to the following:

Faculty member	Description
Brian Berry	Former dean of the School of Economic, Political and Policy Sciences at the University of Texas at Dallas. He graduated from University College, London, with a B.Sc. (Economics) degree in 1955. He went on to the University of Washington, where he completed an M.A. in 1956, and a Ph.D. in 1958, studying under noted geographer and leader of the "quantitative revolution" William Garrison. From 1976 to 1981 Berry was chaired professor at Harvard, and following that was appointed dean of the Heinz College at Carnegie Mellon University for a period of 5 years. In 1986 he joined the University of Texas at Dallas, and has remained there since. Berry was elected to the National Academy of Sciences in 1975, is a fellow of the British Academy, the American Academy of Arts and Sciences, and University College, London. He also received the Royal Geographical Society's highest honor, the Victoria Medal, in 1988.
Gopal Gupta	Professor and former head of the Department of Computer Science at the University of Texas at Dallas. He was president of the Association for Logic Programming, 2010–2014; University of Texas at Dallas outstanding computer science teacher of the year, 2008; Best paper award, European Conferences on Web Services 2005
Harsh Gupta	Indian earth scientist and seismologist, known for his pioneering work on estimation of reservoir-induced earthquakes. He is a former adjunct professor at UTD, former vice chancellor of the Cochin University of Science and Technology (CUSAT) and a Raja Ramanna Fellow at the National Geophysical Research Institute (NGRI), Hyderabad. A recipient of the 1983 Shanti Swarup Bhatnagar Prize for Science and Technology, the highest Indian award in the science and technology category, and the 2008 Waldo E. Smith Award, Gupta was awarded the fourth highest Indian civilian honour of the Padma Shri in 2006.
Zygmunt J. Haas	Professor and distinguished university endowed chair in computer science. He received his B.Sc. degree summa cum laude from the Technion in 1979, his M.Sc. degree summa cum laude in 1985, and his Ph.D. degree from Stanford University, Stanford, California in 1988. He is a Fellow of the Institute of Electrical and Electronics Engineers (IEEE) and a Fellow of the Association for Computing Machinery (ACM). He is an author of well over 300 referred journal, conference, and magazine publications. He holds over 20 patents in the fields of wireless communications, wireless networks, high-speed networks, optical communication, and optical networks. Prior to joining University of Texas at Dallas, he was a faculty member at Cornell University in the School of Electrical and Computer Engineering, and a member of technical staff at AT&T Bell Labs in the Network Research department. He also served as a program director at NSF in the Engineering Directorate.
John H.L. Hansen	Department head and professor in the Department of Electrical Engineering, also professor in School of Behavioral and Brain Sciences (Speech & Hearing), and Distinguished University Endowed Chair in Telecommunications Engineering. He received the B.S.E.E. degree with highest honors from Rutgers University, New Brunswick, N.J. in 1982. He received the M.S. and Ph.D. degrees in electrical engineering from the Georgia Institute of Technology, Atlanta, Georgia, in 1983 and 1988, respectively. He is a Fellow of the Institute of Electrical and Electronics Engineers (IEEE) and has been elected as one of the 6 International Speech Communication Association (ISCA) Fellows for 2010. He is internationally known for his contributions to Robust Speech & Speaker Recognition under Stress and Noise. Hansen is the author/coauthor of over 340 journal and conference papers, books, and book chapters in speech processing, and is coauthor of the textbook Discrete-Time Processing of Speech Signals.
John H. Hoffman	The associate dean for undergraduate studies, School of Natural Sciences & Mathematics. He received his bachelor's degree from St. Mary's College in Winona, Minnesota and continued his education at the University of Minnesota under the mentorship of Professor A. O. C. Nier who pioneered the field of mass spectroscopy. His PhD dissertation was on the helium isotopic distribution in large iron meteorite. A physics professor and member of UT Dallas' William B. Hanson Center for Space Sciences, Hoffman is part of a group led by Peter Smith of the University of Arizona in Tucson who were selected in 2003 by NASA to charter an uncrewed mission to Mars. He has designed and built scientific instruments that have flown on numerous exploration missions — both crewed and uncrewed — into space and to other planetary bodies and objects, including the moon, Venus, and Halley's Comet. He has worked at UT Dallas and its predecessor research institution since 1966.
Russell A. Hulse	Associate vice president for research and economic development at the University of Texas at Dallas. He is the discoverer of the first binary pulsar and co-recipient of the 1993 Nobel Prize in physics and joined the University of Texas at Dallas as a visiting professor of physics and of science and math education in January 2004. Hulse earned a B.S. degree in physics in 1970 from the Cooper Union for the Advancement of Science and Art in Manhattan. He received a Ph.D. degree in physics in 1975 from the University of Massachusetts at Amherst. After earning his Ph.D. degree, he was awarded a postdoctoral appointment at the National Radio Astronomy Observatory in Charlottesville, Va.
Mustapha Ishak Boushaki	Professor of cosmology in the University of Texas at Dallas since 2015. He received his B.Sc. and M.Sc. from Université de Montréal and his Ph.D. from the Queen's University at Kingston, Ontario. The author of countless book chapters and articles, Mustapha has lectured and written extensively on the astrophysics, cosmology, dark matter, dark energy, acceleration of the universe and gravitational lensing.
Mihai Nadin	UTD Ashbel Smith Professorship in Interactive Arts, Technology, and Computer Science, has a Ph.D. degree in aesthetics from the University of Bucharest and a post-doctoral degree in philosophy, logic and theory of science from LMU Munich, West Germany. He earned an M.S. degree in electronics and computer science from the Polytechnic Institute of Bucharest and an M.A. degree in philosophy from the University of Bucharest. The author of 23 books and countless articles, Nadin has lectured and written extensively on the mind, anticipation and dynamic systems, visualization, ubiquitous computing and various aspects of human-computer and human-technology interaction. He is credited with introducing various terms and phrases that have found wide usage throughout society, including "semiotic machine," "post-industrial society," "the civilization of illiteracy" and "anticipatory computing."
Wolfgang Rindler	Professor of physics, received his B.Sc. and M.Sc. from Liverpool University and his Ph.D. from the Imperial College, London. Professor Rindler focuses his research on theoretical relativistic cosmology and on basic problems in general relativity. He is a leading physicist working in General Relativity where he is well known for introducing the term "event horizon", Rindler coordinates, and (in collaboration with Roger Penrose) for popularizing the use of spinors in general relativity.
Robert Xavier Rodriguez	A professor in the School of Arts and Humanities, earned a Doctor of Musical Arts (D.M.A.) in composition from the University of Southern California. He has served as composer in residence for the Dallas Symphony and, most recently, the San Antonio Symphony. He holds the endowed chair of University Professor of Music and is director of the Musica Nova ensemble at the University of Texas at Dallas. He is the recipient of a Guggenheim Fellowship as well as a grant from the National Endowment for the Humanities.
Mark W. Spong	The Dean of the Erik Jonsson School of Engineering & Computer Science, also the Lars Magnus Ericsson Chair in Electrical Engineering, and Excellence in Education Chair. He received his D.Sc. in systems science and mathematics, Washington University in St. Louis, 1981; M.S. in systems science and mathematics, Washington University in St. Louis, 1979; M.S. in mathematics, New Mexico State University, Las Cruces, NM, 1977; B.S. in mathematics and physics, Hiram college, Hiram, OH, 1975. Among his many awards are the IROS Fumio Harashima Award for Innovative Technologies, 2007, John R. Ragazzini Award, American Automatic Control Council, 2004 and Distinguished Member Award, IEEE Control Systems Society, 2002.
Temoc the Comet	Currently the mascot of UTD, Temoc did not earn a traditional post-secondary education. Contrary to popular belief, Temoc is not actually a person. Rather, he is a non-human entity that temporarily envelops a human host during various school activities and events, often making appearances with the school's cheerleading team, power dancers, and athletic teams. He was born in 1998, making him the school's youngest faculty member. He is recognizable not only by his blue-gray skin and fiery hair, but also by his distinct lack of various facial expressions and features, such as sadness and a nose. Although shrouded with mixed opinion, Temoc is beloved by the student body as a whole and is a cherished part of the UTD culture.
Bhavani Thuraisingham	Executive director of the Cyber Security Research & Education Institute and a professor at UT Dallas. She is a Louis A. Beecherl, Jr. Distinguished Professor of computer science, visiting senior research fellow in the Department of Informatics at King's College London, and a Cyber Security Policy Fellow at New America. Thuraisingham received a B.Sc. in pure mathematics, applied mathematics, and physics from the University of Ceylon in 1975, an M.Sc. in mathematical logic and foundations of computer science from the University of Bristol in 1977, an M.S. in computer science from the University of Minnesota in 1984, a Ph.D. in the Theory of Computation and Computability Theory from the University of Wales in 1979, and a Doctorate of Engineering at the University of Bristol in 2011. She is a world-leading expert in data security and data mining, is well known for protecting billions of pieces of data while finding proactive ways to prevent potential threats, and was among the first in the nation to discuss privacy violations and data mining. At UT Dallas, she and her research team have pioneered new ways to detect threats and laid the framework for secure information-sharing using cloud services. Her work has resulted in over 100 keynote addresses, 120 journal papers, 300 conference papers, 15 books, and 8 patents.
Frederick Turner	Founders Professor of Arts and Humanities. He received his B.Litt, English Language and Literature, Oxford University, 1967 and MA, English Language and Literature, Oxford University. He is known for his poetry and his literary criticism. He is a poet, a cultural critic, a playwright, a philosopher of science, an interdisciplinary scholar, an aesthetician, an essayist, and a translator. He is the author of twenty-eight books and winner of the Milan Fust Prize (Hungary's highest literary honor), the Levinson Poetry Prize (awarded by Poetry), the PEN Dallas Chapter Golden Pen Award, the Missouri Review essay prize, the David Robert Poetry prize, and the Gjenima Prize. He was nominated for the Nobel Prize for Literature in 2004, 2006, 2007, and 2008.
Mathukumalli Vidyasagar	Holds the Cecil H. and Ida Green Chair in Systems Biology Science at UT Dallas and leads the bioengineering department in the Jonsson School. Vidyasagar earned a bachelor's degree in electrical engineering by age 17 from the University of Wisconsin. He spent his early career as a professor at Concordia University in Montreal and the University of Waterloo in Waterloo, Canada. Then directed the Centre for Artificial Intelligence and Robotics within the Indian government's Ministry of Defense. Vidyasagar was given an Institute of Electrical and Electronics Engineers fellowship for "contributions to the stability analysis of linear and nonlinear distributed systems" and has been elected a Fellow of The Royal Society.
Anvar Zakhidov	One of the co-founders and associate director of the UTD Nanotech institute. He graduated from Tashkent Technical University Uzbekistan, USSR in 1975, obtained his M.S. in 1977 and Ph.D. in Physics (Optics) from Institute of Spectroscopy of USSR Academy of Sciences in Moscow in 1981. He was actively involved in scientific research in various places, including the Nuclear Institute of Uzbekistan Academy of Sciences, (1983–1988) and 5 years in Japan as a Monbusho Visiting Professor in IMS, Okazaki, Kyoto, and Osaka Universities. Also a year in Italy (Bologna) at the Institute of Molecular Spectroscopy. From March 1996 until July 2000 he was a senior principal scientist working with advanced materials at Honeywell Inc. (formerly AlliedSignal). Zakhidov has been awarded internationally recognized awards and fellowships for excellence in Physics and Material Science (Monbusho and NEDO (Japan), and INTAS (Europe)).

== University presidents ==
President	Dates	Description
Francis S. Johnson	1969–1971	Head of the Southwest Center for Advanced Studies (SCAS), formerly the Graduate Research Center of the Southwest, served as interim president of UTD after SCAS was turned over to the state on June 13, 1969, and officially became the University of Texas at Dallas on September 1, 1969.
Bryce Jordan	1971–1981	The university's first president in July, 1971. He went on to serve as president of UT Dallas for 10 years before being appointed as executive vice chancellor for academic affairs at the University of Texas System, and was a president of Penn State University.
Alexander L. Clark	1981–1982	Joined UT Dallas as the university's first vice president for academic affairs on September 1, 1974, a post he held for 17 years. His leadership was instrumental in designing the strategy, organization and policies of the university's academic programs and provided the foundation for UT Dallas' prominence in visionary research programs. Clark served as acting president for more than eight months between the Jordan and Rutford administrations
Robert Hoxie Rutford	1982–1994	Robert H. Rutford was an Antarctic explorer and scientist of international acclaim, having been recognized with the naming of the Rutford Ice Stream and Mount Rutford, in Antarctica. He served as president of UT Dallas throughout a formative period during the university's 40-year-history. During his tenure as president, the university secured approval for a school of engineering, added freshmen and sophomores to its student body and built the first on-campus housing. He was named president emeritus of UTD on July 12, 2007 by the University of Texas System Board of Regents. Rutford received the 2010 Medal for International Scientific Coordination by the Scientific Committee on Antarctic Research (SCAR).
Franklyn Jenifer	1994–2005	Joined U.T. Dallas as president in 1994. UTD's enrollment has increased more than 61 percent during his tenure—from fewer than 8,500 students to nearly 14,000—and the campus has undergone a dramatic physical transformation as major new facilities have been constructed - including buildings for the School of Management, the Erik Jonsson School of Engineering and Computer Science and the Callier Center for Communication Disorders as well as a Student Activity Center, athletic facilities and hundreds of student apartments.
David Daniel	2005–2015	Under President Daniel's leadership, the university has opened an $85 million Natural Science and Engineering Research Laboratory and started work on $220 million in additional construction. Projects include a Math, Science and Engineering Teaching-Learning Center, a complete renovation of Founders Hall, and a Student Services Building that will house many of the primary departments serving students' administrative needs. UT Dallas has also launched a $30 million campus enhancement program, raised the academic rankings of its programs, introduced living-learning communities to residential housing and raised more than $200 million in private funds. Dr. Daniel left UTD to become the deputy chancellor and chief operating officer of the University of Texas System.
Richard Benson	2016–2026	The former dean of the College of Engineering at Virginia Tech assumed the role of university president on July 15, 2016.
Prabhas Moghe	2026–present	The bioengineer assumed the role of university president on April 2, 2026.

== Alumni ==
Notable alumni include:

Alumni	Description
Aaron Aryanpur	Stand-up comedian. Aryanpur studied graphic design at the University of Texas at Dallas, graduating in 2000. In 1998, he created the university's mascot Temoc, a flame-haired anthropomorphic comet originally named "Blaze."
Albert Black	Earned his degree in general studies from UTD in 1982 and that year successfully started his own business, On-Target Supplies & Logistics, which provides major corporations with outsourced supply chain management services. Black sits on the boards of several prominent organizations, including the Greater Dallas Chamber of Commerce, JPMorgan Chase of Texas, Rees Associates, and PrimeSource Food Equipment Company. Additionally, Black is on the board of directors for SMU's Cox School of Business and Baylor University's Hankamer School of Business. He also is on the advisory board for Oncor Energy, the board of governors for the Dallas Foundation and is a trustee of Baylor University Medical Center.
Michael C. Burgess	Received an M.A. in Medical Management from UT Dallas in 2000. He is a Republican congressman of the United States House of Representatives, representing Texas's 26th congressional district.
Angie Chen Button	Holds a Master of Science in Public Finance and Management Services from UTD. She has represented District 112 in Dallas County in the Texas House of Representatives since 2009. She is a native of Taipei, Taiwan and a marketing manager of Texas Instruments. She has resided in Richardson and now Garland.
Ryan Cabrera	Singer-songwriter and musician. He attended UT Dallas for a year before pursuing a successful career in music.
Gabriel Dawe	Received an MFA in Arts and Technology at UT Dallas in 2011. He has gained renown for his large-scale Plexus series of installations of sewing thread, though he also creates works on paper as well as other media. Originally from Mexico City, Dawe creates site-specific installations that explore the connection between fashion and architecture, and how they relate to the human need for shelter in all its shapes and forms. His work, which is often centered in the exploration of textiles, has been exhibited in the US, Canada, Belgium, Denmark, and the UK. His creations has been featured in numerous publications around the world, including Sculpture magazine, the cover of the 12th edition of Art Fundamentals published by McGraw-Hill, and in Tristan Manco's book Raw + Material = Art.
Chijindu Kelechi Eke	Nigerian-American film director and software engineer who received a Master of Business Administration and a Master of Science in Information Technology from the University of Texas at Dallas. He is the founder of the African Film Festival(TAFF), and the creator of African streaming service, Rootflix. After a coronation in 2023, he was installed into a chieftaincy role as the "Ichie Ihemba" of Imerienwe in the Imo State of Nigeria.
Brian Fridge	In 2011, Fridge earned an MFA degree in Arts and Technology from UT Dallas. He is a video artist known for his low-tech, poetic approach has a precedent in Arte Povera and his explorations of symbol and process are reminiscent of alchemy. His most recent creations are silent, black and white videos that explore light, matter, space, and time. His work has been exhibited in the Castello di Rivoli - Museo d'Arte Contemporanea in Turin, Italy, the Whitney Museum of American Art in New York, Modern Art Museum of Fort Worth, the Museum of Fine Arts in Houston, and the Phoenix Art Museum.
Morton A. Gernsbacher	Gernsbacher is a leading researcher in the cognitive processes and mechanisms that underlie language comprehension, an area she first studied at UT Dallas while pursuing a master's degree in human development through the School of Behavioral and Brain Sciences in 1980. A recognized leader in her field, she has served as president of both the Association for Psychological Science and the Division of Experimental Psychology in the American Psychological Association. She has published more than 120 journal articles and invited book chapters, and has served as editor, associate editor, or editorial board member for numerous academic journals and books. Gernsbacher also holds the distinction of two named professorships: the Vilas Research Professor and the Sir Frederic Bartlett Professor of psychology.
David Hanson	David Franklin Hanson, Jr., develops human-like robots with realistic facial expressions and conversational abilities. He received a BFA from the Rhode Island School of Design in film/animation/video, while developing robots as art. Hanson later worked as a sculptor and a technical consultant at Walt Disney Imagineering. He received his Ph.D. from the University of Texas at Dallas in spring of 2007. Hanson serves as president and founder of Hanson Robotics.
Dipak C. Jain	1987 Ph.D. in marketing, School of Management. Jain is the Sandy and Morton Goldman Professor in Entrepreneurial Studies and a professor of marketing at the Kellogg School of Management.
Naveen Jindal	Received his MBA in 1992 and is an elected member of India's Parliament. Also as vice chairman and managing director of Jindal Steel & Power Limited, he leads a business that Forbes magazine ranks among Asia's Fab 50 Companies. Moved by the common sight of both the American and Texas flags during his time in Dallas, Jindal successfully campaigned for the right of all citizens of India to fly their nation's flag. To recognize alumni gifts from Mr. Jindal, on October 7, 2011 the School of Management was renamed the Naveen Jindal School of Management.
Mike Judge	Attended UT Dallas and took several graduate-level math classes, planning to earn a master's degree as "a back-up plan" to become a community college math teacher after relocating to the north Dallas area for his ex-wife's new job. However, his original plans ended up working out when Comedy Central acquired Office Space after Judge debuted it at a Dallas animation film festival. He is known for creating the animated series King of the Hill, Beavis and Butt-Head, and The Goode Family along with several live-action films. Office Space and King of the Hill were filmed in and specifically influenced by the suburb of Richardson, where UTD is located.
Linda Koop	Received M.S. degree from School of Management, member of Dallas City Council 2005-2013, incoming 2015 Republican member of the Texas House of Representatives from District 102 in Dallas County, businesswoman and government official
Melendy E. Lovett	1982 M.S. accounting, School of Management. President of Texas Instruments (TI) Educational & Productivity Solutions and senior vice president of TI. Lovett has worldwide responsibility for TI's leadership position in math and science educational technology and professional development.
Jerry Madden	Received his Master of Science degree in management and administration sciences from UT Dallas School of Management in 1978. First elected to the Texas House of Representatives in November 1992, the Republican served in the position from 1993 to 2013. He was the vice chair of the House Corrections Committee and a member of the House Judiciary and Civil Jurisprudence Committee.
Gjekë Marinaj	Earned three degrees (BA, MA, and Ph.D) in the Humanities from UT Dallas and received a certificate in Holocaust Studies from the Ackerman Center for Holocaust Studies. He is a poet, world literature scholar, translator, literary critic, and founder of the Protonism Theory. He has received several international awards, including two National Insignia Prizes from the Vietnam Writers' Association, Italy's International Author Prize, Uzbekistan's Poet of the World Prize, West Bengal's World Poet Prize, India's ISISAR Award for seeking peace through literature, and South Korea's Changwon KC International Literary Prize. His works have been praised, translated, published, and discussed in over twenty languages and countries. Marinaj has received multiple nominations for the Nobel Prize in Literature.
John McCaa	2015 Ph.D, School of Arts and Humanities. McCaa was a Dallas news anchor who worked on-air for WFAA-TV starting in 1984, and retiring in 2019.
Brian McCall	Received his Ph.D. in Humanities-Aesthetic Studies from the University of Texas at Dallas in 2006. McCall was a member of the Texas House of Representatives from 1991 to 2010. He was named chancellor of the Texas State University System in March 2010 to succeed Charles R. Matthews. McCall received a bachelor's degree from Baylor University and a master's degree from Southern Methodist University. He is the author of The Power of the Texas Governor: Connally to Bush released in March 2009.
Katrina Pierson	Received a B.S. in biology from UT Dallas in 2006 after earning an A.S. degree from Killgore College. She became a notable Tea Party activist beginning in 2009 and campaigned for senator Ted Cruz in 2012 (appearing on-stage with him the night he won the Texas state election). After losing a 2014 Congressional race in the Republican primary for the Texas' 32nd district, she became a national spokesperson for Donald Trump's 2016 presidential campaign. Pierson turned down an offer to become the White House Deputy Press Secretary, deciding instead to become a senior adviser for the Trump 2020 campaign. She is often seen making several TV appearances defending Trump on CNN.
James F. Reilly, II	Earned three degrees (B.S., M.S. and Ph.D) in Geosciences from UT Dallas. An astronaut for NASA, Reilly has logged more than 500 hours in space on two Space Shuttle missions.
Aziz Sancar	Received his Ph.D. in molecular biology in 1977. Aziz Sancar was awarded the Nobel Prize in Chemistry 2015 along with Tomas Lindahl and Paul L. Modrich for their mechanistic studies of DNA repair. He is the Sarah Graham Kenan Professor of Biochemistry and Biophysics at UNC School of Medicine and member of the National Academy of Sciences.
Ross William Ulbricht	Ulbricht, who graduated in 2006 with a bachelor's degree in physics, later established the Silk Road, an online black market and the first modern darknet market, while using the name "Dread Pirate Roberts."
Nicolas Antony Valcik	A three-time graduate from the University of Texas at Dallas; B.A. in Interdisciplinary Studies 1994, M.P.A. in 1996, and Ph.D. in Public Affairs 2005. Valcik was formerly the managing director of Institutional Research at Texas Tech University. He is the former director of Institutional Research and Business Intelligence at the University of Texas of the Permian Basin, the executive director of Institutional Effectiveness at Central Washington University, the former director of Institutional Research at West Virginia University and the former associate director of the Office of Strategic Planning and Analysis for the University of Texas at Dallas where he worked from 1997 to 2013. in 2023, Valcik qualified for and competed as a member of the US Judo National Team in the 2023 Pan American Kata Championship in Guadalajara, Mexico. As of 2018, Valcik is editor-in-chief for two book series: Taylor and Francis/CRC Press Public Health Series and Taylor and Francis/CRC Press Emergency Management Series. He is an Author/co-author of 17 books and an editor/co-editor of 7 books and 22 journal articles and chapters.
James R. Von Ehr II	Received an M.S. in mathematical sciences (computer science) from the University of Texas at Dallas. Von Ehr is the founder and CEO of Zyvex Corporation, the world's first molecular nanotechnology company. He also endowed the James Von Ehr Distinguished Chair of Science and Technology at the University of Texas at Dallas, held by the late Alan G. MacDiarmid 2000 Nobel Laureate in Chemistry and founded the Texas Nanotechnology Initiative in December, 2000.
