= Harsh Gupta =

Indian earth scientist and seismologist (born 1942)

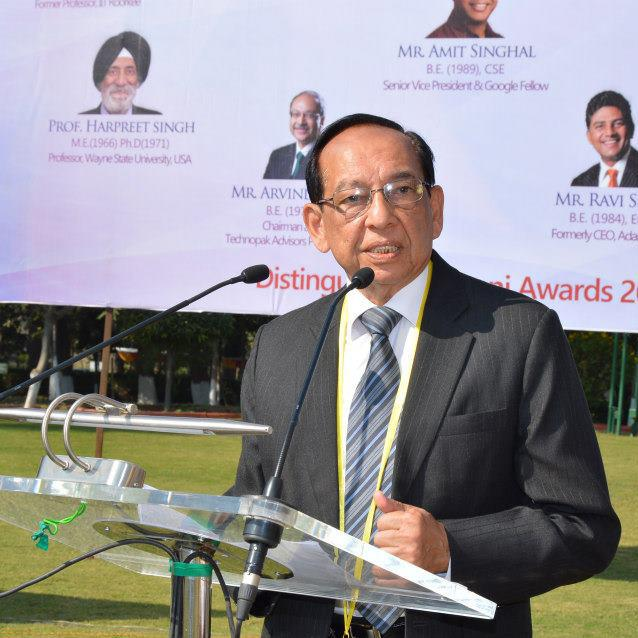
- Harsh Gupta at IIT Roorkee, 24 July 2005
- Born: 28 June 1942 (age 83); India
- Occupations: Geophysicist; Seismologist
- Known for: Seismology
- Awards: Padma Shri; Shanti Swarup Bhatnagar Prize; 100 Years of International Geophysics Memorial Medal; National Mineral Award; Professor K. Naha Memorial Award; Nayudamma Memorial Gold Medal Award; Waldo E. Smith Award

Harsh Kumar Gupta (born 1942) is an Indian earth scientist and seismologist, known for his pioneering work on estimation of reservoir-induced earthquakes. He is a former vice chancellor of the Cochin University of Science and Technology (CUSAT) and a Raja Ramanna Fellow at the National Geophysical Research Institute (NGRI), Hyderabad. A recipient of the 1983 Shanti Swarup Bhatnagar Prize for Science and Technology, the highest Indian award in the science and technology category, and the 2008 Waldo E. Smith Award, Gupta was awarded the fourth highest Indian civilian honour of the Padma Shri in 2006.

== Biography ==
Gupta Ji, born on 28 July 1942, did his Schooling in St.George's College, Mussoorie ( Batch of 1957) and graduate studies (BSc Hons) at the Indian School of Mines, Dhanbad, from where he also secured his master's degree (MSc) in Applied Geophysics. Later, he obtained a doctoral degree (PhD) from the Indian Institute of Technology, Roorkee and pursued advanced studies in Seismology at the International Institute of Seismology and Earthquake Engineering, Tokyo, on a two-year UNESCO fellowship. Moving to the US, he joined the University of Texas at Dallas (UTD) as a research scientist in 1972, a post he held till 1977. In 1982, he became the director of the Centre for Earth Science Studies, Thiruvananthapuram and worked there till 1987. He also served as the project director of the Kerala Mineral Development and Exploration Project (KMDEP) during the same period. He was appointed as the vice chancellor of the Cochin University of Science and Technology (CUSAT) in 1987 and stayed at the post till he was offered the position of the Advisor of the Department of Science and Technology in 1990 for a two-year stint. In 1992, he took up the responsibility of the director of the National Geophysical Research Institute (NGRI), Hyderabad. He served the institution for nine years and, in 2001, he was appointed as the Secretary at the Department of Ocean Development of the Government of India from where he superannuated in 2005.

Gupta, after returning from the US, continued his association with the University of Texas at Dallas as an adjunct professor till 2001. He is a former member of the National Disaster Management Authority (NDMA), a post which had the rank of a Union Minister, during 2011–14. He has served as the president of many scientific societies such as International Union of Geodesy and Geophysics (IUGG), Asia Oceania Geosciences Society, and Geological Society of India. He is the founder president of the Asian Seismological Commission and presided over the commission from 1996 to 2000. He has served as an advisor and consultant to the Commonwealth Science Council, UNESCO, International Atomic Energy Agency (IAEA) and the International Council for Science (ICSU).

== Legacy ==
Gupta's researches have been focused on the study of earthquakes and he is known to have developed methodology for discriminating normal earthquakes from reservoir-induced ones. He has developed procedures to estimate the potential of reservoir-triggered earthquakes at a given site. His later studies are reported to have assisted in understanding the genesis of stable continental region earthquakes. He has conducted investigative studies on the structure of the regional crust of the Arabian Sea and the Bay of Bengal. His studies have been documented by way of over 200 scientific papers in national and international journals and five books, namely, Disaster Management, Oceanology, Geothermal Energy: An Alternative Resource for the 21st Century, Reservoir Induced Earthquakes (Developments in Geotechnical Engineering), and Three Great Tsunamis. He has also edited 15 books, which included the Encyclopedia of Solid Earth Geophysics.

Gupta headed the team which set up the Indian Tsunami Warning System. He was the leader of the III Indian Scientific Expedition to Antarctica and his team established Dakshin Gangotri, a permanent Indian station at Antarctica during 1983–84, reportedly in record time. It was during his tenure as the Government Secretary, the Department of Ocean Development implemented programmes such as bathymetry surveys of the Indian Exclusive economic zone, the establishment of an Indo-Russian Gas Hydrate Centre at Chennai and a 1 MLD low temperature thermal desalination plant at Kavaratti. He also worked for presenting the Indian claim for Legal Continental Shelf and developing technologies for detecting water resources, rain harvesting, and assessing earthquake hazards.

== Awards and honours ==
Gupta, a Raja Ramanna Fellow of the National Geophysical Research Institute, received the Shanti Swarup Bhatnagar Prize for Science and Technology in 1983, for his work in Seismology. The National Academy of Sciences, India (NASI) elected him as their Fellow in 1986 and he received the 100 Years of International Geophysics Memorial Medal of the USSR Academy of Sciences in 1985. He became an elected Fellow of the Indian National Science Academy (INSA) in 1989, and two years later, he was selected for the 1991 National Mineral Award. The year 2000 brought him two awards, Indian Geophysical Union Millennium Award and Indian Society of Applied Geochemists Millennium Award.

Gupta received the National Mineral Award for a second time in 2002 and the Professor K. Naha Memorial Award of the Indian National Science Academy in 2004. The Government of India included him in the Republic Day Honours list for the civilian award of the Padma Shri in 2006. He is also a recipient of the 2003 Jawaharlal Nehru Birth Centenary visiting Fellowship and 2008 Nayudamma Memorial Gold Medal Award. The same year, the American Geophysical Union honoured him with the Waldo E. Smith Award.

== Selected bibliography ==
- Harsh K. Gupta (1992). Reservoir Induced Earthquakes (Developments in Geotechnical Engineering). Elsevier Science. p. 382. ISBN 9780444889065.
- Harsh K. Gupta (2003). Disaster Management. Orient Blackswan. p. 188. ISBN 9788173714566.
- Harsh K. Gupta (2005). Oceanology. Universities Press. p. 232. ISBN 9788173715297.
- Harsh K. Gupta; Sukanta Roy (2006). Geothermal Energy: An Alternative Resource for the 21st Century. Elsevier Science. p. 292. ASIN B000WOM32C.
- Harsh K. Gupta; Kusumita Arora; A. Cazenave; Eric Robert Engdahl; Rainer Kind; Ajay Manglik; Sukanta Roy; Kalachand Sain; Seiya Uyeda (2011). Encyclopedia of Solid Earth Geophysics. Springer. p. 1539. ISBN 9789048187010.
- Harsh K. Gupta; Vineet K. Gahalaut (2013). Three Great Tsunamis. Springer. p. 89. ISBN 9789400765757.

== See also ==
- Dakshin Gangotri
- Indian Institute of Technology (Indian School of Mines), Dhanbad
- Indian Ocean Tsunami Warning System
- List of geophysicists
- List of University of Texas at Dallas people
