= Sandra Bond Chapman =

American academic

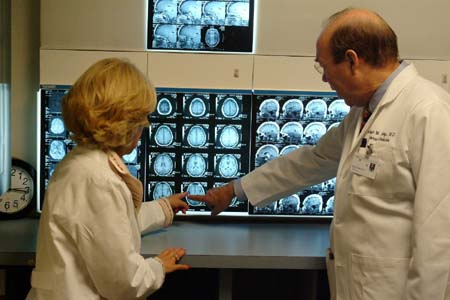
Sandra Bond Chapman and a colleague

Sandra Bond Chapman is a cognitive neuroscientist, founder and chief director of the Center for Brain Health, Dee Wyly Distinguished Professor in Brain Health, and a professor in the School of Behavioral and Brain Sciences at The University of Texas at Dallas.

== Education ==
Chapman received her B.A. (in Speech Pathology) and M.A. (in Communication Disorders) from the University of North Texas. Her Ph.D. in Communication Disorders is from University of Texas at Dallas.

== Career ==
Chapman began her career in the 1970s as a speech pathologist, where she often worked with autistic children with high support needs. During this time, Chapman noticed that several of the children with high support needs were able to solve complex puzzles despite their perceived deficits. This contradiction sparked Chapman's interest in the brain’s potential and modifiability. Chapman founded the Center for Brain Health, a multidisciplinary center housing brain researchers and therapists working collectively to prevent, arrest, and reverse brain traumas. Chapman continues to serve as the chief director.

== Research ==
Chapman’s cognitive research has laid the theoretical framework and empirical foundation for the development of measurements of higher order reasoning [Test of Strategic Learning] and the development of brain training programs for children and adults. Her research elucidates novel approaches to maximize cognitive function in people with healthy brains as well as those with brain injury, stroke, ADHD, autism, schizophrenia, substance abuse, and progressive brain diseases like Alzheimer's disease.

Chapman's research has resulted in more than 120 publications, nearly 60 funded research grants, and has served as a national public health road for maintaining cognitive fitness and building critical thinking and reasoning skills in adolescents. Chapman was the principal member writing the first state plan for Brain Health fitness for adults. She is a core member for NIH's selection process of central data elements for nationwide clinical trials on acquired brain injury. Throughout her career, Chapman has received major federal, state, and private research support to advance the treatment of veterans, sports-related brain injuries, concussions, autism, schizophrenia, adolescent reasoning, and brain development, among others.

Chapman has also published Make Your Brain Smarter, a book of mind improvement strategies.

== Memberships ==
Chapman is a member of the following organizations:

- Academy of Aphasia
- Academy of Neurologic Communication Disorders & Sciences
- Alzheimer’s disease and Related Disorders Association, Inc.
- American Association for the Advancement of Science
- American Speech Language and Hearing Association
- American Society of Aging
- American Speech-Language-Hearing Association
- A.W.A.R.E. (The Association of Women for Alzheimer’s Research and Education)
- Charter 100 Member
- Cognitive Neuroscience Society
- Communities Foundation of Texas Designated Fund (CFT) Advisory Committee
- The Dallas Assembly
- Dallas NanoSystems Technical Advisory Board
- Gerontological Society of America
- International Neuropsychological Society
- International Women’s Forum Member
- National Aphasia Association, Regional Representative
- The Sarah Jane Brain Foundation National Advisory Board
- Society for Experimental Biology and Medicine Council
- Society for Neuroscience
- Texas Council for Alzheimer’s, Advisory Board Task Force
- Texas Speech and Hearing Association
