= David E. Daniel =

American academic administrator

David Edwin Daniel (born December 20, 1949, in Newport News, Virginia, U.S.) is a former deputy chancellor of the University of Texas System. Previously, he was the fourth president of the University of Texas at Dallas, where he served from 2005 to 2015. He is a former councillor of National Academy of Engineering. As of 2020, he serves as a consultant in Dallas, Texas.

Daniel received his doctorate in civil engineering from the University of Texas at Austin in 1980, where he also served as a faculty member until 1996 before moving to the University of Illinois at Urbana-Champaign. Daniel was Gutgsell Professor of Civil Engineering and department head until becoming dean of the College of Engineering in 2001. He has written numerous books, book chapters, technical and scientific publications, as well as serving as editor-in-chief of the Journal of Geotechnical and Geoenvironmental Engineering from 1992 to 1995. Daniel was awarded the prestigious Norman Medal in 1975, the American Society of Civil Engineers' highest honor, and has twice received the Croes Medal .

He was elected a member of the National Academy of Engineering in 2000 for leadership in developing the geoenvironmental engineering field, and major contributions to engineering practice involving landfills and waste containment systems. In 2013, he was elected to be a Councillor of National Academy of Engineering.

== Notes ==
Academic offices
Preceded by Franklyn Jenifer	President of the University of Texas at Dallas; 2005-2015	Succeeded by Richard C. Benson
