= Center for BrainHealth =

Research institute

Coordinates: 32.824620°N 96.847675°W

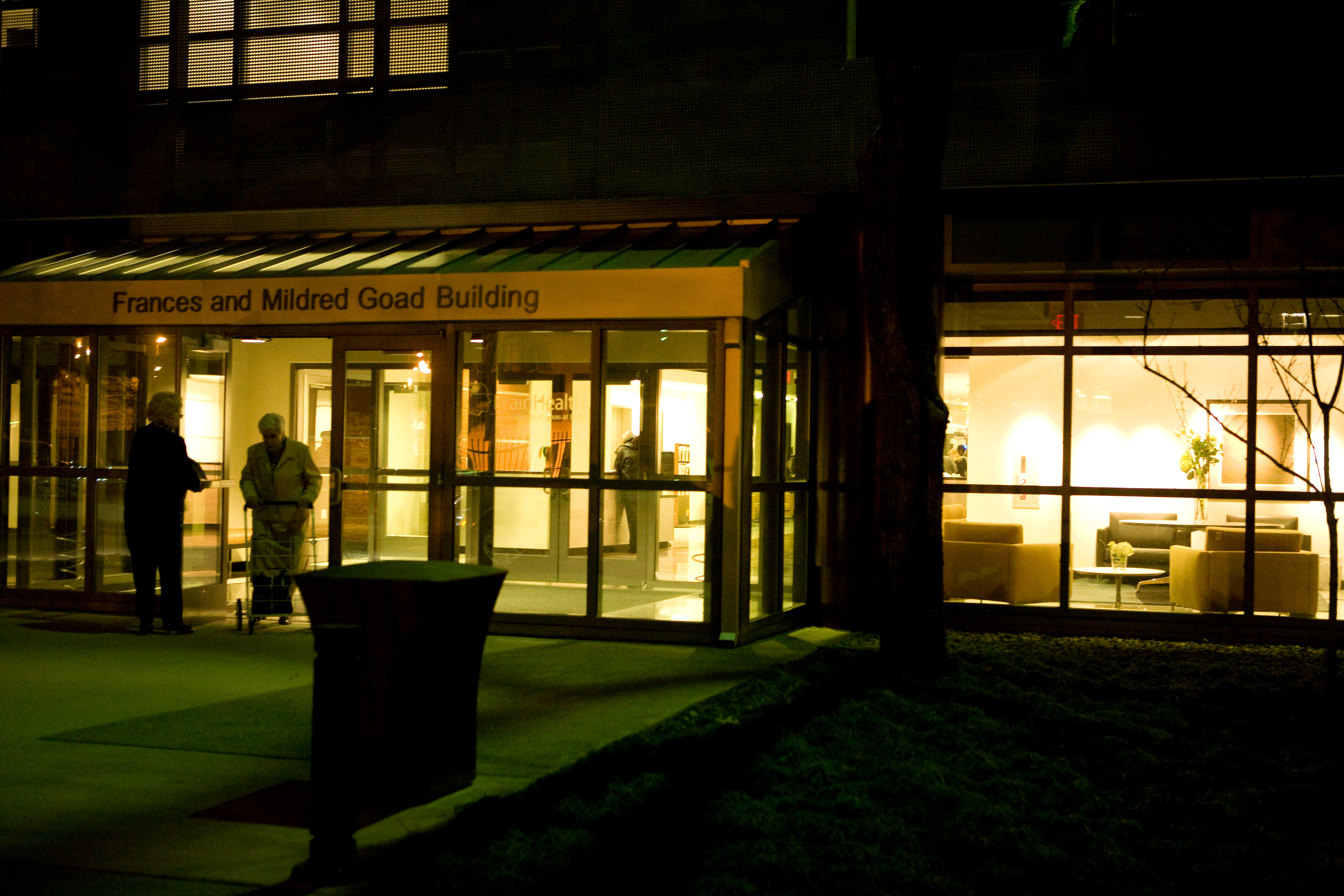
The Center for BrainHealth

The Center for BrainHealth, part of The University of Texas at Dallas' school of Behavioral and Brain Sciences, is a research institute focused exclusively on brain health that combines brain research with clinical interventions. Founded by Sandra Bond Chapman in 1999, the Center for BrainHealth houses 125 researchers, postdoctoral research fellows, doctoral students, master's students, and research clinicians who work on 60 privately and federally funded research projects. The Center provides academic training and houses specialists in, among many others, Alzheimer's disease, traumatic brain injury (TBI), healthy brain aging, multiple sclerosis, autism, attention deficit hyperactivity disorder (ADHD), stroke, and posttraumatic stress disorder (PTSD). To help raise awareness of and funding for research underway at the Center for BrainHealth, a number of proponent groups have formed. These include the Think Ahead Group (TAG) of young professionals and Friends of BrainHealth.

== History ==
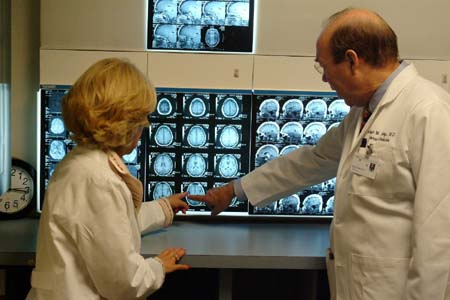
Sandra Bond Chapman and a colleague

The Center for BrainHealth, part of The University of Texas at Dallas (UTD), was established in 1999 under the direction of Sandra Bond Chapman, UT Dallas' Dee Wyly Distinguished Chair in Brain Health. Originally located at UT Dallas' Callier Center for Communication Disorders, in 2004 the Texas Higher Education Coordinating Board approved the purchase and renovation of a nearby building at 2200 Mockingbird Lane in Dallas to be the Center's own facility. This facility is adjacent to the UT Southwestern North Campus. The Center's virtual lab is part of the National Pediatric Acquired Brain Injury Plan, and in 2004 the BrainHope Program was established for children with traumatic brain injuries. Also in 2004, Dee and Charles Wyly endowed the $2-million Dee Wyly Distinguished Chair at the Center and a $1.5-million gift from Sallie and Frederic B. Asche, Jr., to enable the establishment of the Sallie and Frederic B. Asche Jr. Advanced Treatment Wing at the Center for BrainHealth.

In 2005 the Center received a $2-million gift to endow a chair for the Center's medical science director. The Center's memory research initiatives were expanded in 2006 with $1 million to establish the Berman Laboratory for Learning and Memory and the Berman Scholars Program for young researchers doing postdoctoral training in memory. In 2007, businessman and philanthropist T. Boone Pickens donated $5 million to the Center for BrainHealth to fund educational and research initiatives in the area of brain science. In 2008, the Center's Middle School Brain Years project conducted the pilot study of its Strategic Memory and Reasoning Training (SMART) Program, an experimental curriculum designed to improve strategic reasoning skills in teens. The pilot study's success led to a $6 million grant from Texas Legislature for the project's expansion. Sandra Chapman was director in 2018. Then, the institute had a training program, Strategic Memory Advanced Reasoning Training (SMART) that it was developing.

== Research ==
Researchers work side-by-side with clinicians. Brain scientists at the Center use technologies to elucidate how brain networks can be strengthened and reconnected, including electroencephalography (EEG) to record the brain's electrical rhythms during cognitive task performance, functional MRI (fMRI) scans to measure brain blood flow during cognitive tasks, an indicator of brain activity and brain morphometrics to measure size and shape differences of brain regions to millimeter accuracy. The Center houses specialists in various fields of neuroscience, and has produced publications from members of the BrainHealth team. Research initiatives include:

Healthy Brain	•Provide BrainHealth Fitness Checkups, cognitive-linguistic assessments to establish baseline function, highlight strengths, identify weaknesses, and provide recommendations to preserve mental abilities •Expand the knowledge of improving of corporate environments by increasing workforce mental productivity, looking for ways to strengthen the brain's frontal lobes, take advantage of dramatic brain plasticity as people age, and challenge mental talents and capacities.
Semantic Memory Processing in Normal Adults	•Establish localization of brain regions associated with different sub-types of memory
Brain Training	•Evaluate the effect of novel brain training in normally aging adults
Traumatic Brain Injury/Stroke	•Cognitive and social outcome of pediatric TBI: Investigating impact of impairments on academic, social, and psychological functioning •Memory deficits following pediatric TBI: Evaluating changes in working memory and related brain activation in those with head injury •Brain imaging and genetics in Social Cognition: establishing battery to assess social cognition •Genetic factors and outcome from TBI: examining a predisposition to recovery potential after brain injury •Growth and abnormalities after pediatric TBI: developing procedures for medical testing and treatment •Self regulation abilities in children with severe TBI: development of self-regulation evaluation tools for children with severe brain injury and the subsequent foundation for rehabilitation •Cognitive retraining and memory dysfunction in brain injury of adults: neuroimaging biomarkers and diagnostic tools for working memory and semantic memory deficits in head injury and cognitive rehabilitation treatment paradigm
Gulf War syndrome	•Development of diagnostic criteria for Gulf War Syndrome
Attention deficit hyperactivity disorder	•Development and implementation of strategic memory and reasoning training (SMART) intervention program
Autism spectrum disorders	•Establish assessment battery for social cognition •Development of various intervention programs using virtual computer technology
Dementia	•Language of Hereditary Dysphasic Disinhibition Dementia: examination of linguistic markers of early disease onset •Discourse Assessment of Frontotemporal Lobar Degeneration (FTLD):analysis of language to differentiate differences between subtypes of FTLD, Alzheimer's, and healthy controls •Semantic Memory and Gist Performance in Frontotemporal Lobar Degeneration, Mild Cognitive Impairment, and Alzheimer's using fMRI and EEG: characterizing language distinctions in populations
Military Service Members and the Brain	•Proactively optimizing brain performance •Building resilience in cognitive brain function •Reversing losses in cognitive capacity
Post Traumatic Stress Disorder	•Combining Cognitive processing therapy (CPT) and repetitive transcranial magnetic stimulation (rTMS). •No-cost, non-drug clinical trial to further investigate the effectiveness of a paired treatment

== Facilities ==
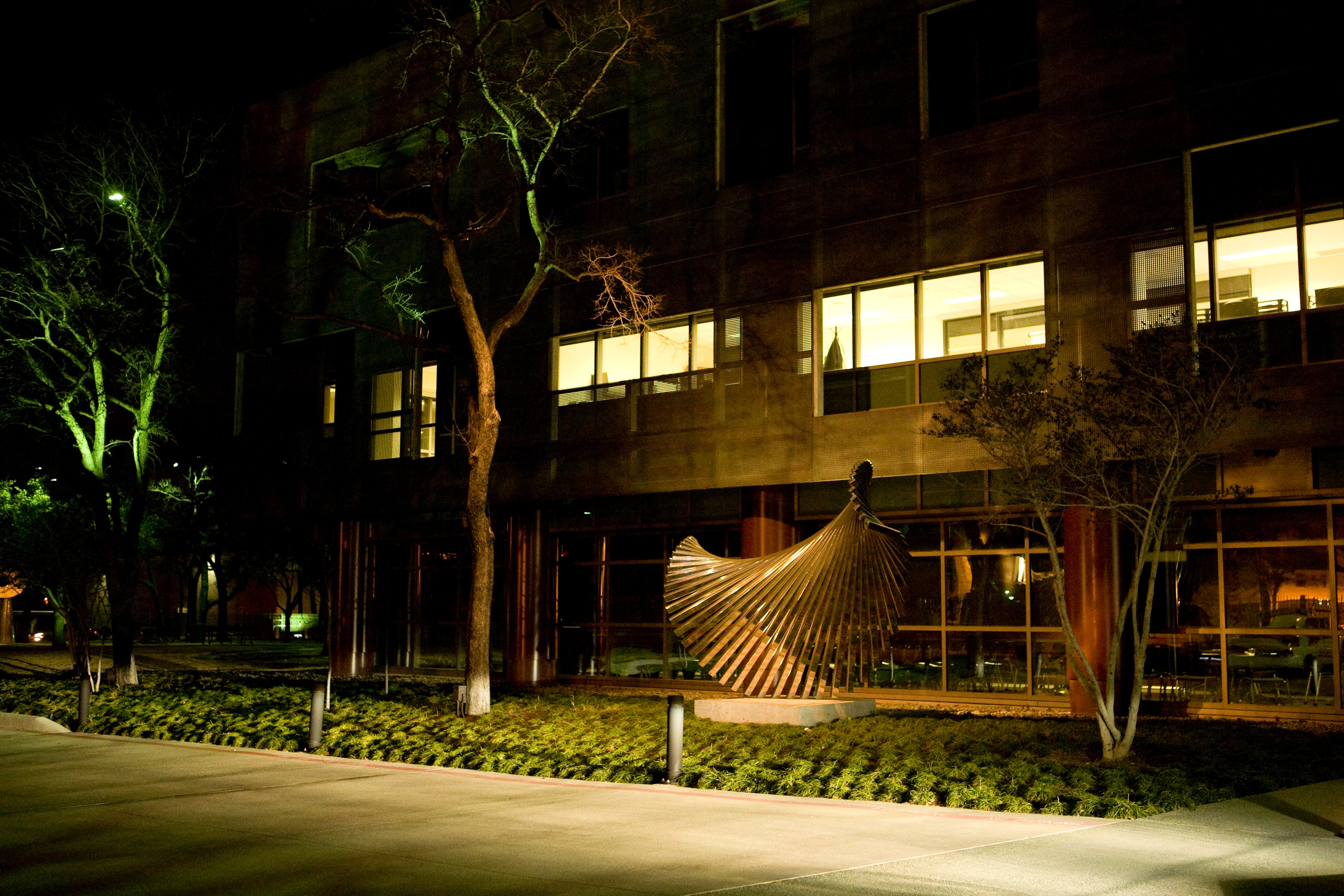
The Frances and Mildred Goad Building

The Center for BrainHealth is located in a 63,000-square-foot (5,900 m^{2}) building designed by Kyley Harvey of HKS, Inc., on a 3.5 acres (0.014 km^{2}) site near the UT Dallas' Callier Center for Communication Disorders and the University of Texas Southwestern Medical Center in the city of Dallas. In 2004, UT Dallas purchased a building with a $5 million donation from Dianne Cash. The new building was named the Frances and Mildred Goad Building in honor of Cash's mother, who benefited from the Center's efforts, and grandmother. Originally constructed in 1970, the redesign and remodel was an extensive undertaking that began in June 2005, completed in September 2006, with the building formally dedicated on January 26, 2007. Each floor of the facility is dedicated to carrying out one aspect of BrainHealth's mission and includes an auditorium, virtual classrooms, the T. Boone Pickens Virtual Learning Center, and a reception hall. The second floor contains computers and data analysis tools, as well as an outlet for brain scientists, engineers, and technology experts to explore data. The third floor houses clinically based research projects, including a facility for individuals to undergo brain fitness checkups for discovering ways to prevent memory decline and a place for adults and children to participate in research aimed at learning more about how to strengthen brain function after injury or disease. The Center for BrainHealth houses electroencephalography labs, data analysis tools, MRI machines, an rTMS (Repetitive Transcranial Magnetic Stimulation) lab, and brain morphometric laboratories.

== Think Ahead Group ==
Think Ahead Group is the young professionals donor organization at the Center for BrainHealth. It was founded in 2009. It is based in Dallas, Texas, that raises awareness of brain health and funds for research taking place at the Center for BrainHealth.

The Think Ahead Group, founded in October 2009, now includes over 300 members. All contributions support the cause of brain health and the Center's many research focus areas-Alzheimer's disease, traumatic brain injury (TBI), autism, attention deficit hyperactivity disorder (ADHD), stroke, posttraumatic stress disorder (PTSD), addiction, BrainHealth physical, dementia, exercise and the brain, healthy brain aging, and virtual brain training.

== Directors ==
- Sandra Bond Chapman, Ph.D. - Founder and Chief Director
- John Hart, Jr., M.D. - Medical Science Director
- Sarah Monning, M.B.A. - Community Relations Director
