= Therese Moretto Jorgensen =

American physicist

Therese Moretto Jorgensen is an American physicist who has served as research director at NASA's Heliophysics Division. She served as senior scientist at the Department of Physics and Technology of the University of Bergen. Jorgensen received a Waldo E. Smith award from the American Geophysics Union (AGU) in 2020.
