= John H. Hoffman =

Space scientist (1929–2021)

- Born: September 7, 1929
- Died: February 3, 2021 (aged 91); Dallas, Texas, U.S.
- Education: Saint Mary's University of Minnesota (B.S.); University of Minnesota (M.S., Ph.D.)
- Awards: NASA Lunar Orbit Experiment Team Group Achievement Award, 1971; UT Chancellor's Council Outstanding Teacher Award, 1988
- Scientific career
- Fields: Physics, Space science, Atmospheric science
- Institutions: U.S. Naval Research Laboratory; Southwest Center for Advanced Studies; University of Texas at Dallas
- Doctoral advisor: Alfred O. C. Nier

John Hoffman (September 7, 1929 – February 3, 2021) was a space scientist who developed instruments for Apollo 15, Apollo 16, Apollo 17, the Pioneer Venus project, and Giotto mission. He also designed the mass spectrometer for the Phoenix Mars Lander mission in May 2008. He was a professor of physics at the University of Texas at Dallas.

== Education ==
Hoffman's father was a chemistry professor and his mother was a pianist. He learned to appreciate both science and music as a child, having played the clarinet and oboe.

Hoffman received his bachelor's degree from St. Mary's College in Winona, Minnesota and continued his education at the University of Minnesota under the mentorship of Professor A.O.C. Nier who pioneered the field of mass spectrometry. His PhD dissertation was on the helium isotopic distribution in large iron meteorites.

== Career ==
Hoffman spent 7 years at the U.S. Naval Research Laboratory in Washington, D.C., developing miniaturized mass spectrometers for space flight. These were flown on Aerobee and Javelin rockets.

He joined the Graduate Research Center of the Southwest in 1966. His main interest was in the study of atmospheric/ionospheric composition and isotopic ratios for which he has developed instrument packages that have flown on many rockets and satellites.

== Missions ==
He developed instruments for the Apollos 15, 16, and 17 lunar missions, the latter being part of the ALSEP surface package. The goal was to detect and determine the composition of the lunar atmosphere. There is an atmosphere on the Moon composed mainly of noble gases and hydrogen, but the pressure is lower than that in the best vacuum systems on Earth. His instrument flew on the Pioneer Venus Multiprobe mission to Venus in 1978. Data was received throughout the descent of the probe to the surface. Carbon dioxide is the dominant gas in the atmosphere. A surprise discovery showed that for the two "sister" planets there is a two order of magnitude difference in the isotopic ratios (the ratio of the heavier to lighter forms of these gases) for hydrogen and argon than for those gases on Earth. These isotopic ratio differences have had large implications on models of the nature of the solar nebula and the formation of the present (secondary) atmospheres of the terrestrial planets.

Hoffman was a member of the team who flew a mass spectrometer on the European Space Agency's Giotto mission to Halley's Comet in 1986. This instrument was developed by laboratories in four countries, three European and one at UT Dallas. It measured both the neutral and ionized constituents of the comet's coma. The coma contains, besides water vapor and H30 ions, an extended source of carbon monoxide. The atmosphere forms around a comet as it comes near the Sun and is heated by radiation from the Sun.

Hoffman has also flown mass spectrometers on Earth orbiting satellites, Explorer 31, ISIS-II, AE-C, D, and E, and Wake Shield, plus numerous sounding rockets and stratospheric balloon flights. The first observations of the polar wind, ions flowing out from the atmosphere, were made by his ion mass spectrometer flown on the ISIS spacecraft in 1971.

Hoffman was a co-investigator for the TEGA experiment that flew on the Mars Scout Phoenix mission that descended on Mars on May 25, 2008. The spacecraft will land in the far northern region of Mars, above the Arctic Circle in the area that the Mars Odyssey spacecraft has found evidence for water. An arm on the lander will dig a trench a meter deep in the surface of Mars to look for water ice and other water related substances (minerals). These will be scooped up and analyzed in a series of small furnaces. The effluents from the furnaces will be analyzed by the UT Dallas mass spectrometer to determine the presence of water and the mineralogical composition of soil samples. Isotopic ratios of the principal elements in the samples will be determined and compared to the isotopic ratios of the atmospheric gases that will be measured by the mass spectrometer when it is not analyzing samples from the TEGA furnaces.
