= Franklyn Jenifer =

Franklyn Green Jenifer (born March 26, 1939, in Washington, D.C.) is a former academic administrator, researcher, trustee, and board member of a number of well-known institutions and companies.

== Biography ==
Franklyn Jenifer is an alumnus of Howard University, and received a doctorate in plant virology from the University of Maryland.

Jenifer was elected to serve on the board of trustees for Fairleigh Dickinson University. in 2011. He has been re-elected twice, with his current term scheduled to expire in 2020.

He held the role of President of the University of Texas at Dallas (1994–2005), and President of Howard University (1990–1994). He was the first graduate of Howard University to become its head.

Jenifer was Provost at the Rutgers Newark Campus, Chancellor of the Massachusetts Board of Regents of Higher Education (1986–1990) and Vice Chancellor of the New Jersey Department of Higher Education (1979–1986).

He has also served as chairman for the National Council on Science and Technology Education for Project 2061 of the American Association for the Advancement of Science |and has served on the board of directors at Texaco and Chevron.

Academic offices
Preceded by Robert H. Rutford	President of the University of Texas at Dallas; 1994–2005	Succeeded by David E. Daniel
