= Waldo E. Smith Award =

Award given by the American Geophysical Union

The Waldo E. Smith Award, previously known as the Waldo E. Smith Medal, is given out by the American Geophysical Union to recognize "individuals who have played unique leadership roles in such diverse areas as scientific associations, education, legislation, research, public understanding of science, management, and philanthropy, and whose accomplishments have greatly strengthened and helped advance the geophysical sciences". The award was created in 1982 and named after Waldo E. Smith, the first Executive Secretary of the AGU. The award is given not more often than every other year.

== Past recipients ==
Source (to 2012): AGU
Source (2014 onwards): AGU

- 1984 Waldo E. Smith
- 1986 Thomas F. Malone
- 1988 Philip H. Abelson
- 1990 Naoshi Fukushima
- 1992 Earl G. Droessler
- 1994 Cecil H. Green
- 1996 Ned Ostenso
- 1998 Margaret A. Shea
- 2000 Rosina Bierbaum
- 2002 Ivan I. Mueller
- 2004 J. Michael Hall
- 2006 John A. Knauss
- 2008 Harsh K. Gupta
- 2010 A.F. Spilhaus, Jr.
- 2012 David Simpson
- 2014: Meinrat Andreae
- 2016: Mark B. Moldwin
- 2018: M. Meghan Miller
- 2020: Therese Moretto Jorgensen
- 2022: Ellen S. Kappel

== See also ==
- List of geophysics awards
- List of geophysicists
- List of prizes named after people
