= Bryce Jordan =

President of Penn State University

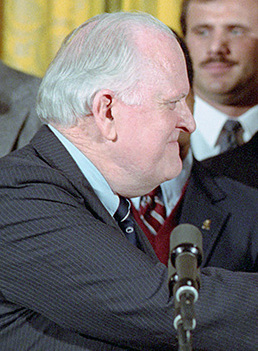
- Jordan in February 1987

14th President of the Pennsylvania State University
- In office 1983–1990
- Preceded by: John W. Oswald
- Succeeded by: Joab Thomas

President of the University of Texas at Dallas
- In office 1971–1982
- Preceded by: Francis S. Johnson (interim)
- Succeeded by: Robert H. Rutford

President of the University of Texas at Austin
- Interim; 1970–1971
- Preceded by: Norman Hackerman
- Succeeded by: Stephen Hopkins Spurr

Personal details
- Born: Henry Bryce Jordan; September 22, 1924 Clovis, New Mexico, U.S.
- Died: April 12, 2016 (aged 91) Austin, Texas, U.S.
- Education: University of Texas at Austin; University of North Carolina; Hardin–Simmons University

Henry Bryce Jordan (September 22, 1924 – April 12, 2016) was an American university administrator and musicologist. He was the fourteenth president of the Pennsylvania State University, serving from 1983 until 1990. Prior to that, he served as interim president of the University of Texas at Austin from 1970 to 1971 and as first president of the University of Texas at Dallas from 1971 to 1982.

During Jordan's tenure at Penn State, the university became the 11th member of the Big Ten Conference in 1990.

Penn State's Bryce Jordan Center, the university's indoor arena and one of the largest arenas in the state, is named after him. He died on April 12, 2016, in Austin, Texas.
