= Robert H. Rutford =

American geologist, university president (1889–1968)

2nd President of the University of Texas at Dallas
- In office 1982–1994
- Preceded by: Bryce Jordan
- Succeeded by: Franklyn Jenifer

Interim Chancellor of the University of Nebraska–Lincoln
- In office August 10, 1980 – May 31, 1981
- Preceded by: Roy Young
- Succeeded by: Martin Massengale

Personal details
- Born: January 26, 1933 Duluth, Minnesota, U.S.
- Died: December 1, 2019 (aged 86) Dallas, Texas, U.S.
- Occupation: Geologist, university president, football coach, track and field coach

Robert Hoxie Rutford (January 26, 1933 – December 1, 2019) was an American geologist, university administrator, and college sports coach. He was the second president of the University of Texas at Dallas, serving from 1982 until 1994. Prior to coming to Dallas, Rutford was a professor at the University of Nebraska–Lincoln and served as its interim chancellor from 1980 to 1981. He has been noted for his geological research on Antarctica.

Rutford was a member of several United States Antarctic Program expeditions to Antarctica, and was the leader of the University of Minnesota's Ellsworth Mountains Party in 1963–1964. Rutford served as director of the Division of Polar Programs of the National Science Foundation from 1975 to 1977.

The 14,688 foot/4,477 meter-high Mount Rutford, which is the summit of Craddock Massif in the Sentinel Range of the Ellsworth Mountains in the Antarctic, was named for him in 2007. The 130 mile-long Rutford Ice Stream, a "mile-thick, fast flowing stream" which drains part of the West Antarctic Ice Sheet into the sea, had previously been named for him.

Rutford was born on January 26, 1933, in Duluth, Minnesota. He attended the University of Minnesota, where he played college football, as an end, halfback, linebacker, and quarterback. At Minnesota, he also competed in track and field, running hurdles and the 440-yard dash. In the late 1950s, Rutford worked as an assistant football coach and teaching assistant in the geography department at his alma mater, the University of Minnesota. In 1958, he was hired as the head football coach and head track and field coach at Hamline University in St. Paul, Minnesota. Rutford resigned from his coaching posts at Hamline in 1961 to pursue graduate studies at the University of Minnesota.

== Head coaching record ==
=== Football ===
Year	Team	Overall	Conference	Standing	Bowl/playoffs
Hamline Pipers (Minnesota Intercollegiate Athletic Conference) (1958–1961)
1958	Hamline	2–6	2–5	T–6th	
1959	Hamline	0–8	0–7	8th	
1960	Hamline	0–8	0–7	8th	
1961	Hamline	1–7	0–7	8th	
Hamline:		3–29	2–26		
Total:		3–29			

Academic offices
Preceded by Bryce Jordan	President of the University of Texas at Dallas; 1982–1994	Succeeded by Franklyn Jenifer
