= Mount Rutford =

Mountain in Ellsworth Land, Antarctica

Highest point
- Elevation: 4,477 m (14,688 ft)
- Prominence: 577 m (1,893 ft)
- Coordinates: 78°36′S 85°18′W

Geography
- Location: Antarctica
- Parent range: Sentinel Range

Climbing
- First ascent: Jed Brown (US) December 2006

Location of Craddock Massif in Western Antarctica.

Sentinel Range map.

Mount Rutford is a sharp peak that rises to 4,477 metres (14,688 ft) and marks the highest point on Craddock Massif in the Sentinel Range, Ellsworth Mountains. The peak stands just north of Bugueño Pinnacle and 2.1 mi north of Mount Craddock, with which this naming is associated. Prior to 2006 the peak had no name, but was visually identified by Camilo Rada and Damien Gildea as being higher than Mt Craddock, during their time on the summits of both Vinson (2004) and Craddock (2005). Thus they returned in 2006 and, as part of a larger GPS program, measured the height of this unnamed peak.

As a result of the new GPS data and a new 1:100,000 topographical map being produced by the Omega Foundation, the peak was then named in 2006 by US-ACAN after Robert Hoxie Rutford, member of J. Campbell Craddock's University of Minnesota geological expedition to Ellsworth Mountains, 1962–63; leader, University of Minnesota expedition to Ellsworth Mountains, 1963–64; Director, Division of Polar Programs, NSF, 1975–77; President of SCAR (Scientific Committee on Antarctic Research).

== Maps ==
- Vinson Massif. Scale 1:250 000 topographic map. Reston, Virginia: US Geological Survey, 1988.
- Antarctic Digital Database (ADD). Scale 1:250000 topographic map of Antarctica. Scientific Committee on Antarctic Research (SCAR). Since 1993, regularly updated.
