= University of Texas at Dallas =

Public university in Richardson, Texas, US

- Former names: Graduate Research Center of the Southwest (1961‍–‍1967); Southwest Center for Advanced Studies (1967‍–‍1969)
- Motto: Disciplina Praesidium Civitatis (Latin)
- Motto in English: "An educated mind protects and strengthens democracy" (Note: Disciplina Praesidium Civitatis is a Latinization of the quotation by Mirabeau Lamar that "Cultivated mind is the guardian genius of democracy.")
- Type: Public research university
- Established: February 14, 1961; 65 years ago
- Parent institution: University of Texas System
- Accreditation: SACS
- Academic affiliations: ORAU; URA; Space-grant
- Endowment: $862.7 million (FY2024) (UTD only) $47.47 billion (FY2024) (system-wide)
- Budget: $947.9 million (FY2025)
- President: Prabhas V. Moghe
- Faculty: 1,404 (fall 2023)
- Administrative staff: 281 (fall 2024)
- Total staff: 6,767 (fall 2024)
- Students: 29,886 (fall 2024)
- Undergraduates: 21,602 (fall 2024)
- Postgraduates: 8,284 (fall 2024)
- Location: Richardson, Texas, United States; 32°59′06″N 96°45′00″W
- Campus: Suburban, 645 acres
- Newspaper: The Mercury
- Colors: Orange and green
- Nickname: Comets
- Sporting affiliations: NCAA Division II – LSC
- Mascot: Temoc
- Website: utdallas.edu

The University of Texas at Dallas (UTD or UT Dallas) is a public research university in Richardson, Texas, United States. It is the northernmost institution of the University of Texas System. It was founded in 1961 as a private research arm of Texas Instruments.

The university is classified among "R1: Doctoral Universities – Very high research activity". It is associated with four Nobel Prizes and has members of the National Academy of Sciences and National Academy of Engineering on its faculty with research projects including the areas of Space Science, Bioengineering, Cybersecurity, Nanotechnology, and Behavioral and Brain Sciences. UT Dallas offers more than 140 academic programs across its seven schools and hosts more than 50 research centers and institutes.

While the main campus is officially under the city jurisdiction of Richardson, one-third of it is within the borders of Dallas County. UTD also operates several locations in downtown Dallas – this includes the Crow Museum of Asian Art in the Arts District as well as multiple buildings in the Medical District next to UT Southwestern: the Center for BrainHealth, the Center for Vital Longevity, and the Callier Center for Communication Disorders.

== History ==
=== Establishment ===
Before the founding of the University of Texas at Dallas, Eugene McDermott, Cecil Howard Green and J. Erik Jonsson had purchased Geophysical Service Incorporated (GSI) on December 6, 1941 – the day before the attack on Pearl Harbor. With the rapid increase in defense contracts due to declaration of war with Germany, the General Instrument Division of GSI grew substantially and was later reorganized under the name Texas Instruments, Inc. (TI) in 1951.

The increase in defense contracts also created a shortage in the Dallas–Fort Worth area of the qualified personnel required by TI. At the time, the region's universities did not provide enough graduates with advanced training in engineering and physical sciences. Texas Instruments was forced to recruit talent from other states during its expansion, and the founders observed in 1959 that "To grow industrially, the region must grow academically; it must provide the intellectual atmosphere, which will allow it to compete in the new industries dependent on highly trained and creative minds."

To compensate for a shortage, McDermott, Green, and Jonsson established the Graduate Research Center of the Southwest on February 14, 1961. While the institute initially was housed in the Fondren Science Library at Southern Methodist University, a nearby empty cotton field was later acquired by Jonsson, McDermott, and Green in Richardson, Texas in 1962. The first facility, the Laboratory of Earth and Planetary Science (later named the Founders Building), opened in 1964. The Graduate Research Center of the Southwest was renamed the Southwest Center for Advanced Studies (SCAS) in 1967.

On June 13, 1969, Texas governor Preston Smith signed House Bill 303, which added the institution to the University of Texas System as the University of Texas at Dallas (effective September 1, 1969). When Texas Instruments and UTD co-founders officially bequeathed the young university to the UT System, they boldly stated that they envisioned it would one day become the “MIT of the South.” At the time, the college only accepted graduate students for masters and PhD programs – no undergraduate bachelor's degree programs were offered. Francis S. Johnson served as the initial interim president before Bryce Jordan was selected in 1971.

=== Expansion and growth ===
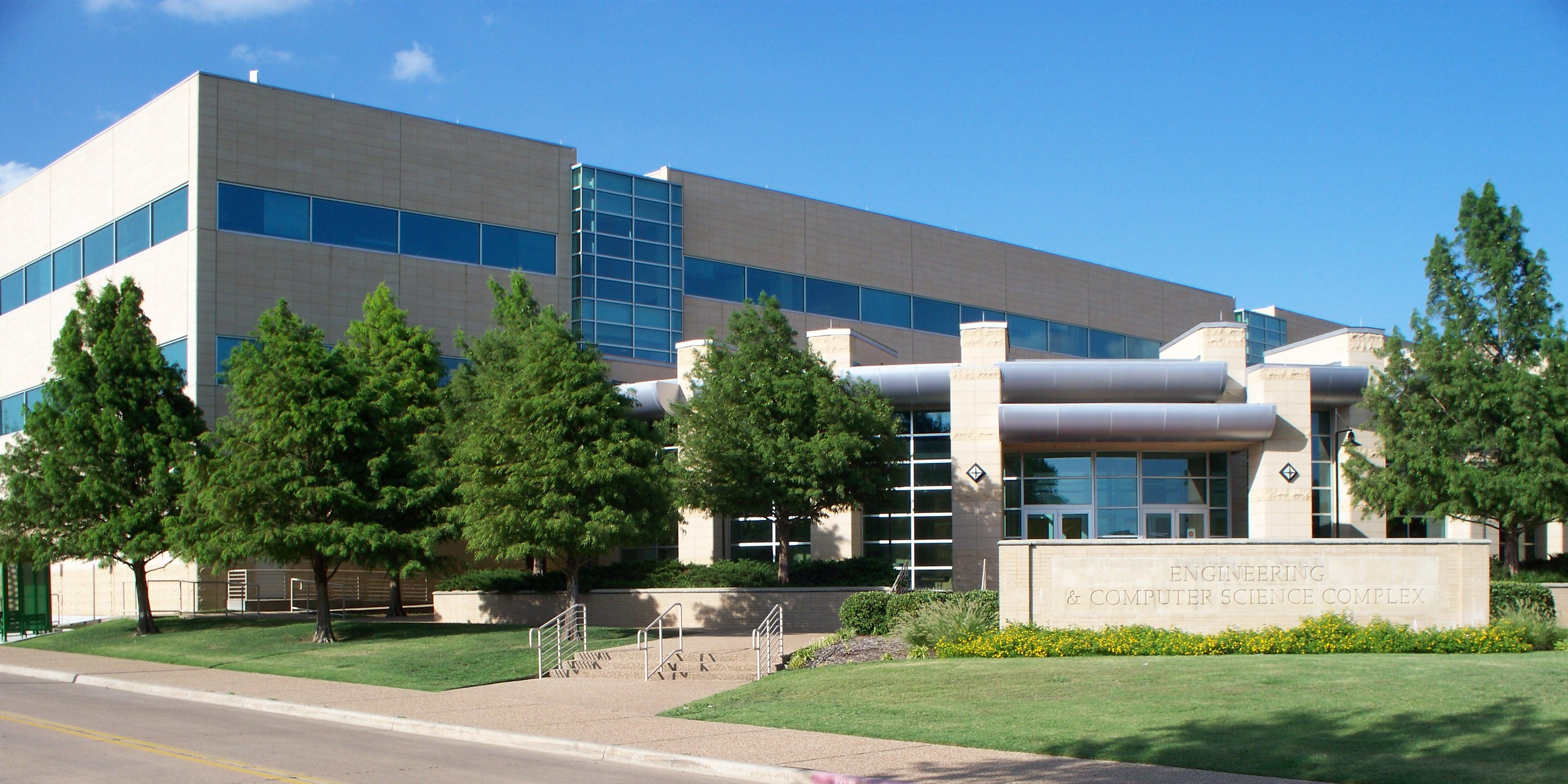
Engineering and Computer Science South Building

In July 1971, Bryce Jordan became the university's first president and served until 1981. At that time the campus consisted of only one facility (the Founders Building) and only admitted graduate students. During Jordan's 10-year tenure the university received 275 acres (111 ha) of land in 1972 from the Hoblitzelle Foundation. This allowed the campus to expand with the addition of a number of new facilities, including most notably the Cecil H. Green Hall, the Eugene McDermott Library, and a campus bookstore. The school received accreditation from the Southern Association of Colleges and Schools in 1972, and the first diplomas were awarded in 1973.

The first bachelor's degrees were awarded in spring 1976. The Callier Center for Communication Disorders became part of the UTD in 1975 and the School of Management opened in 1975. Enrollment increased from 700 in 1974, to 3,333 in 1975, and later to more than 5,300 students in 1977.

UT Dallas's first Nobel laureate, the late Polykarp Kusch, was a member of the physics faculty from 1972 to 1982.

The first art installation, the Love Jack by Jim Love, was added to UTD's campus in 1976. The Visual Arts Building opened in 1978.

Robert H. Rutford, an Antarctic explorer recognized with the naming of the Rutford Ice Stream and Mount Rutford in Antarctica, became the second president of UT Dallas in May 1982. He served in this post until 1994. During his tenure as president, the university secured approval for a school of engineering, added freshmen and sophomores to its student body, and built the first on-campus housing.

The school became a four-year institution in fall 1990. The initial incoming freshman class was about 100 students. The state mandated that admission criteria for entering freshmen "to be no less stringent than the criteria of UT Austin".

Franklyn Jenifer became the third president of UT Dallas in 1994 and served until 2005. During that time, UT Dallas's enrollment increased over 61% – from less than 8,500 to nearly 14,000.

Parts of the university's ceremonial mace have been brought into space. A steel band in the headpiece and the metal foot of the staff fashioned from a scientific instrument designed by the UT Dallas Space Sciences Institute and were flown aboard the Space Shuttle Endeavor in September 1995.

The Galerstein Women's Center opened in 1996. It was renamed the Galerstein Gender Center and then dismantled in 2023 after the passing of SB17.

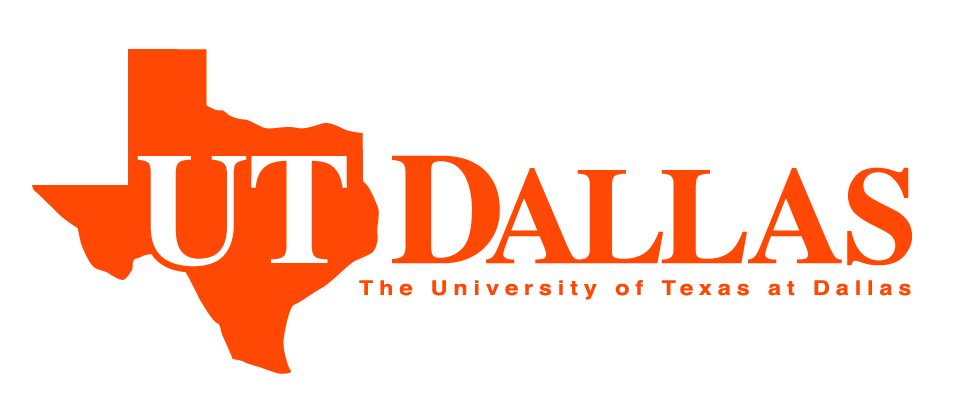
UT Dallas logo, inspired by the Texas Instruments logo

In June 2005, David E. Daniel was appointed the university's fourth president. He previously served on the faculty at UT Austin and was the Dean of Engineering at the University of Illinois from 2001 to 2005. He has continued the expansion of the campus by adding the Natural Science and Engineering Research Laboratory, the Center for BrainHealth (near the University of Texas Southwestern Medical Center), and almost 600,000 square feet (56,000 m2) of new facilities added from 2007 to 2010.

The first fight song was written in September 2008; it was written to the music of Tiger Rag.

=== Attempted DFW-area UT System mergers ===
In July 2001, the 77th Texas legislature failed to pass two proposed bills which had very different plans for the future of the Dallas–Fort Worth metroplex UT System intuitions.

The first plan, 77(R) HB 3568 proposed by Kenn George, would have consolidated the two universities and one medical school under the name "The University of Texas at Dallas". It would have established UT Dallas (UTD) in Richardson, Texas, as the main flagship campus, UT Southwestern Medical Center at Dallas (UTSW) as its medical school, and would have designated UT Arlington (UTA) as a UT Dallas satellite campus (a situation similar to UT Rio Grande Valley). The purpose of the bill was to consolidate all DFW UT System institutions into one, creating a single cohesive flagship-level university for the Dallas–Fort Worth metroplex. However, the bill was unpopular with supporters of UT Arlington (because they wanted to retain their identity as a separate institution from UT Dallas) and the House Bill ultimately failed to pass. Despite this, UT Dallas has continued a close relationship with UT Southwestern. UT Dallas' Center for BrainHealth and Callier Center were built right next to UTSW's main campus in downtown Dallas. Additionally, UT Southwestern later established a Clinical Center in Richardson next to UTD's main campus.

The second plan, 77(R) HB 3607 proposed by Domingo Garcia, would have transferred UT Dallas, UT Southwestern, and UT Arlington to the University of North Texas System (to create something similar to the University of Houston System). The Denton, Texas campus would have remained as the flagship university while the three Dallas–Fort Worth UT System institutions would have been designated as separate degree-granting sister UNT System colleges. Their names would have changed to the "University of North Texas at Dallas" located in Richardson, Texas (not to be confused with the present-day UNTD campus established later in 2009), the "University of North Texas Southwestern Medical Center at Dallas" (UNTSW), and the "University of North Texas at Arlington" (UNTA). The law was left pending due to objections from both UT Arlington and UT Dallas, as both preferred to remain under the UT System.

=== Recent history ===
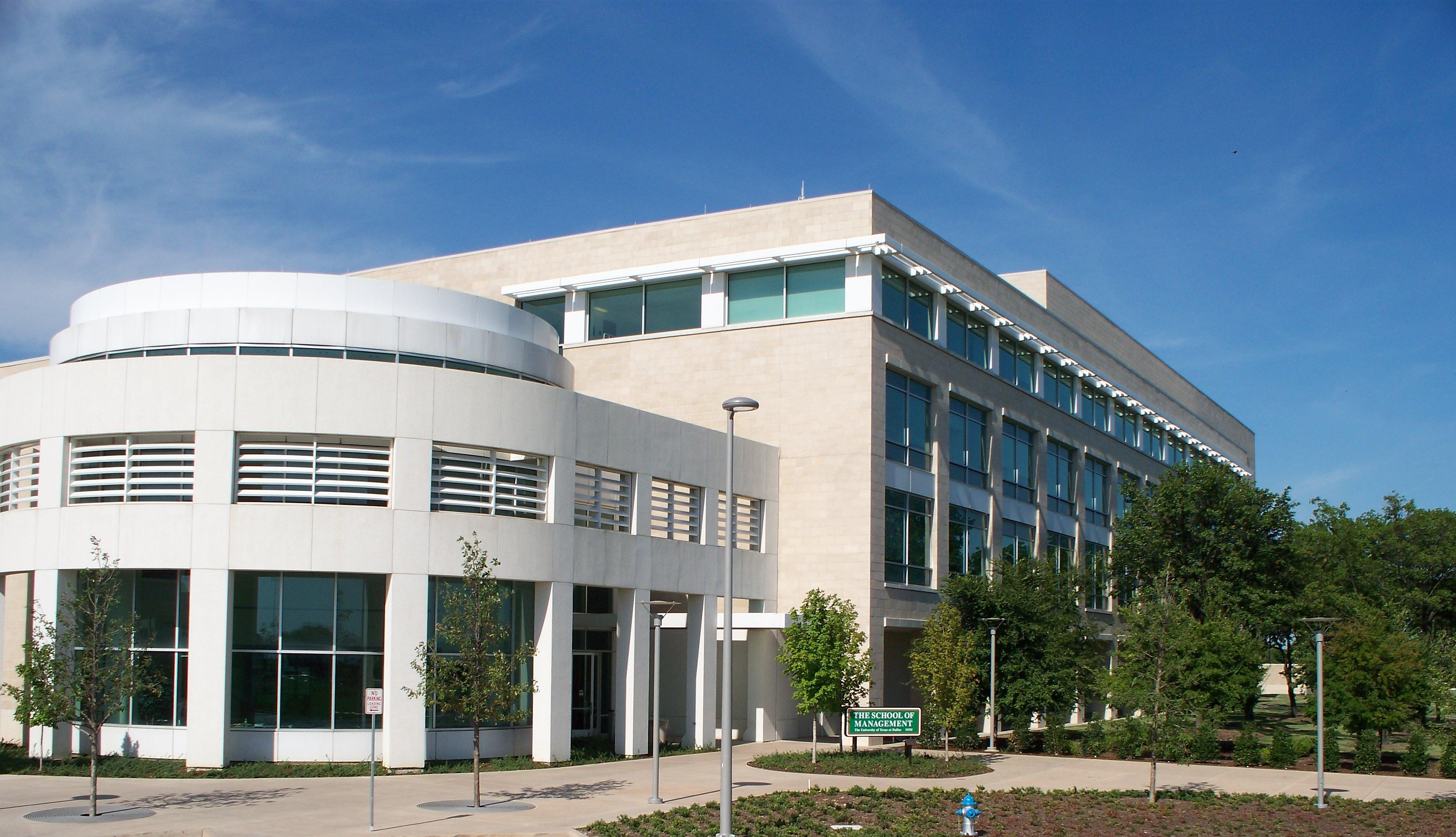
Naveen Jindal School of Management

On July 15, 2016, Richard C. Benson was appointed the fifth president of the University of Texas at Dallas. Previously he was Dean of the College of Engineering at Virginia Tech, which saw record growth from 2005 to 2016 after the number of engineering applicants nearly doubled during his tenure. He has continued the expansion of the UTD campus with the addition of The Bioengineering and Sciences Building, The Engineering & Computer Science West Building, a new Science Building, The Davidson-Gundy Alumni Center, and Northside Phase 1 & 2 (the first on-campus apartments with first floor retail space).

UT Dallas emblem logo

In 2018, the university inherited the Barrett collection of Swiss art which will be housed in a new building as part of the Edith O'Donnell Institute of Art History. In January 2019, the family of Trammell and Margaret Crow donated the entire collection of the Crow Museum of Asian Art to UTD, along with $23 million in support funding to help build a structure on the university campus to show more of the artworks.

In fall 2019 UT Dallas marked its 50 years as a Texas public university (est. 1969), 44 years of undergraduate junior/senior enrollment (since 1975), 29 years of incoming freshmen enrollment (since 1990), and 58 years as a research center (founded in 1961).

In April 2023, University of Texas at Dallas students protested the Gaza war and genocide. They staged a sit-in and setup an encampment, joining other campuses across the USA. The students demanded that the university divest from companies that contribute weapons to the war. The university administration called in riot police to forcibly remove the encampment and there were 17 arrests. UTD students were charged with trespassing on UTD land and threatened with disciplinary action.

On July 20, 2023, UT Dallas announced that it would leave the American Southwest Conference and transition to become an NCAA Division II school in the Lone Star Conference.

On August 26, 2024, UT Dallas President Richard C. Benson announced plans to step down from his position as the fifth president of the university. The UT System Board of Regents conducted a national search for his replacement over the course of the 2024–25 academic year, with Benson persisting in his role until a successor began their term, after which he would remain at the university in a faculty capacity. On May 7, 2025, the Board of Regents announced that Prabhas Moghe, former executive vice president for academic affairs at Rutgers University, had been voted as the sole finalist for the sixth UT Dallas presidency. Moghe's experience with raising research funding at Rutgers was cited as a primary reason for his selection.

In September 2024, the student newspaper The Mercury website was shut down by the administration and the editor removed, allegedly in retaliation for criticism of UTD actions against the pro-Palestinian protesters earlier in the year.

== Academics ==
As of 2024, UTD had an 8-year student graduation rate (Note: The student graduation rate is the share of students who graduated within 8 years of entering UTD for the first time) of 70% for its undergraduate students seeking a bachelor's degree, compared to the national median of 58% for 4-year universities. This is the third-highest student graduation rate for public universities in Texas, behind the 82% student graduation rates of UT Austin and Texas A&M.

=== Rankings ===
Academic rankings

National
- Forbes: 126
- U.S. News & World Report: 109 (tie)
- Washington Monthly: 341
- WSJ/College Pulse: 319

Global
- ARWU: 501–600
- QS: 597 (tie)
- THE: 401–500
- U.S. News & World Report: 537 (tie)

In 2025, U.S. News & World Report in Best Colleges ranked UTD at tied for 109th among national universities. The 2017 Academic Ranking of World Universities placed UTD at 71st–99th in the United States. Washington Monthly's 2015 Annual College and University Rankings placed UTD at 99th in the United States. Kiplinger's Personal Finance magazine's 100 Best Values in Public Colleges 2016 ranked UTD at 33rd in value for in-state residents and 38th for out-of-state students.

=== Colleges and schools ===
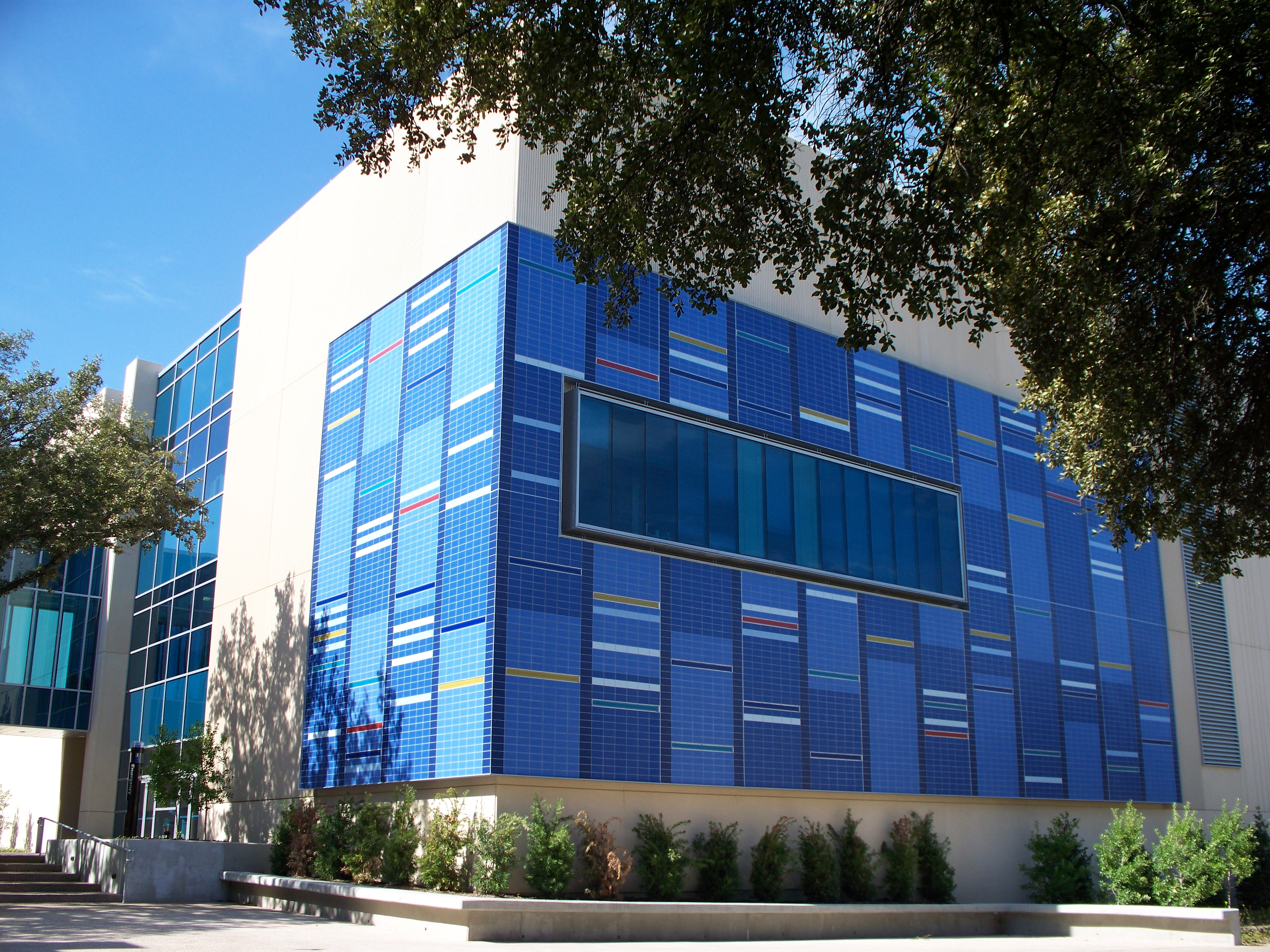
Science Learning Center. The tile exterior represents two patterns: atomic emission spectra of gases, and human DNA.

For fall 2021, the University of Texas at Dallas offered 146 academic programs across its seven schools including 56 baccalaureate programs, 59 master's programs and 31 doctoral programs. The school also offers 33 undergraduate and graduate certificates. The school offers a number of interdisciplinary degree programs.

In July 2022, UTDallas announced it would combine the School of Arts & Humanities with the School of Art, Technology and Emerging Communications (ATEC) to form the School of Arts, Humanities, and Technology (AHT) effective August 22, 2022.

The seven schools of UT Dallas for fall 2024:

- Harry W. Bass Jr. School of Arts, Humanities and Technology
- School of Behavioral and Brain Sciences
- School of Economic, Political and Policy Sciences
- Erik Jonsson School of Engineering and Computer Science
- School of Interdisciplinary Studies
- Naveen Jindal School of Management
- School of Natural Sciences and Mathematics

The Hobson Wildenthal Honors College offers several programs and support resources for high achieving students:

- The Eugene McDermott Scholars Program
- The Collegium V Honors Program
- The Davidson Management Honors Program
- National Merit Scholars Program
- Terry Scholars Program
- Office of Distinguished Scholarships
- Archer Program
- Phi Kappa Phi
- Texas Legislative Internship Program
- Model United Nations

=== Student body ===
Student body composition as of Fall 2024
Race and ethnicity	Total
Asian	42%
White	22%
Hispanic	18%
Black	6%
International student	4%
Two or more races	4%
Unknown	3%
Economic diversity
Low-income (Note: The percentage of students who received an income-based federal Pell grant intended for low-income students.)	31%
Affluent (Note: The percentage of students who are a part of the American middle class at the bare minimum.)	69%

The top majors among undergraduates are computer science; arts, technology, and emerging communication; computer information systems and technology; biology; finance; psychology; business administration; neuroscience; mechanical engineering; and healthcare studies. Undergraduate students comprise 69% of the student body, while graduate students comprise 31%. The majority of graduate students (61.57%) are international students, compared to only 4.43% of undergraduate students being international students.

In the fall 2022–23 academic year, UTD enrolled 227 National Merit Scholars in its freshmen class of 4,220, which was the highest total number in Texas and one of the highest in the nation. The fall 2017 entering freshmen class had an average SAT composite score of 1323 and an average ACT composite score of 29. These freshman SAT/ACT scores are the highest averages in UTD's history – which surpassed Texas A&M's and matched UT Austin's averages of that year. For the 2022–2023 academic year, the university granted 5,227 bachelor's degrees, 3,788 master's degrees and 250 doctoral degrees for a total of 9,265 degrees.

=== Scholarship programs ===
All freshmen admitted to the university are automatically considered for an Academic Excellence Scholarship (AES) Award. For the fall 2017 incoming freshmen class, the awards range from $3,000 per year for tuition and mandatory fees up to complete coverage of UT Dallas tuition and mandatory fees plus $3,000 per semester cash stipend to defray the costs of books, supplies and other expenses.

The McDermott Scholars Program, established at UT Dallas in 2000, provides full scholarships and unique cultural and civic opportunities to academically talented high school students.

The National Merit Scholars Program, established at UT Dallas in 2011, provides admission to the Collegium V Honors college, full tuition and mandatory fees, and an additional stipend.

In 2006, UT Dallas became one of 13 universities in Texas affiliated with the Terry Foundation Scholarship. The Terry Scholars Program is a cohort experience that offers academic, cultural, service, mentoring, and other unique opportunities to traditional and transfer students awarded the prestigious scholarship.

=== Research ===
UT Dallas is classified among "R1: Doctoral Universities – Very high research activity" and had research expenditures of $140 million for the 2022 fiscal year, $60 million of which came from federal fundings. Research projects include the areas of space science, bioengineering, cybersecurity, nanotechnology, and behavioral and brain sciences. The university has more than 50 research centers and institutes and the UTD Office of Technology Commercialization, a technology transfer center.

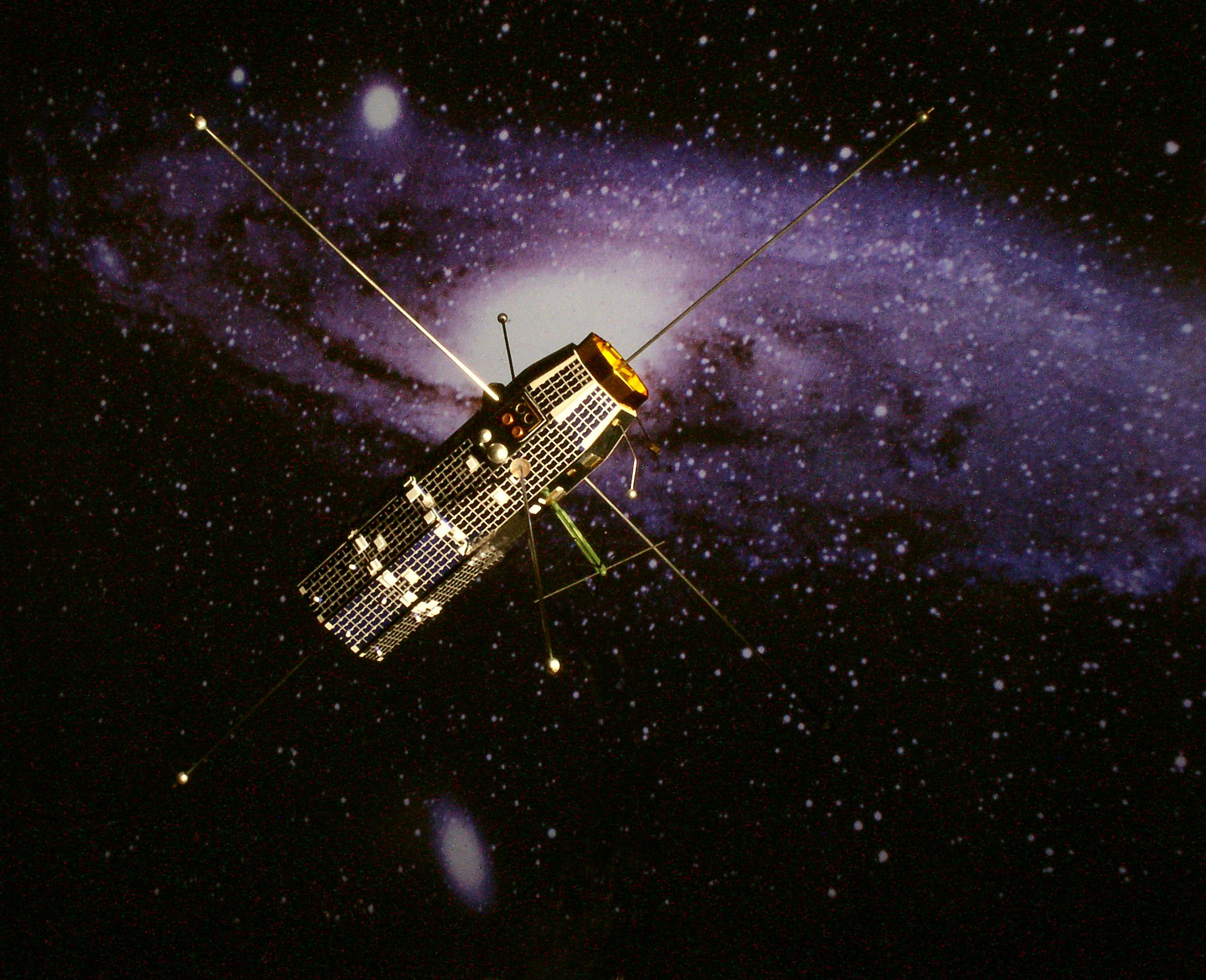
Scale model of the C/NOFS probe. NASA's CINDI instrument is installed on C/NOFS.

The William B. Hanson Center for Space Studies (CSS), affiliated with the Department of Physics, conducts research in space plasma physics. It has its roots in the Earth and Planetary Sciences Laboratory of the university's predecessor. The center conducts a NASA-sponsored mission, Coupled Ion-Neutral Dynamics Investigation (CINDI), which was launched in April 2008 in cooperation with the United States Air Force. CINDI, which is part of the payload for the Communication and Navigation Outage Forecast System program, seeks to uncover information about the equatorial plasma bubbles that interrupt radio signals. Under the leadership of John H. Hoffman, the center designed the mass spectrometer for the Phoenix Mars Lander as part of the Thermal and Evolved Gas Analyzer (TEGA) experiment in cooperation with the University of Arizona.

UT Dallas conducts cybersecurity research in a number of areas including cross-domain information sharing, data security and privacy, data mining for malware detection, geospatial information security, secure social networks, and secure cloud computing. The university is designated a National Center of Academic Excellence in Information Assurance Research for the academic years 2008–2013 by the National Security Agency and Department of Homeland Security.

The Alan G. MacDiarmid NanoTech Institute was established in 2001 when Ray Baughman, a pioneering nanotechnologist, became the Robert A. Welch Distinguished Chair in Chemistry and director of the university's NanoTech Institute. In 2007, it was renamed in memory of the late Alan G. MacDiarmid, who shared the 2000 Nobel Prize in chemistry with Alan Heeger and Hideki Shirakawa for the discovery and development of conductive polymers. The NanoTech Institute has produced more than 200 refereed journal articles, 13 of which have been published in Science or Nature, and given over 300 lectures in the United States and abroad. Ray Baughman was ranked number 30 on the March 2, 2011, Thomson Reuters list of the top 100 materials scientists.

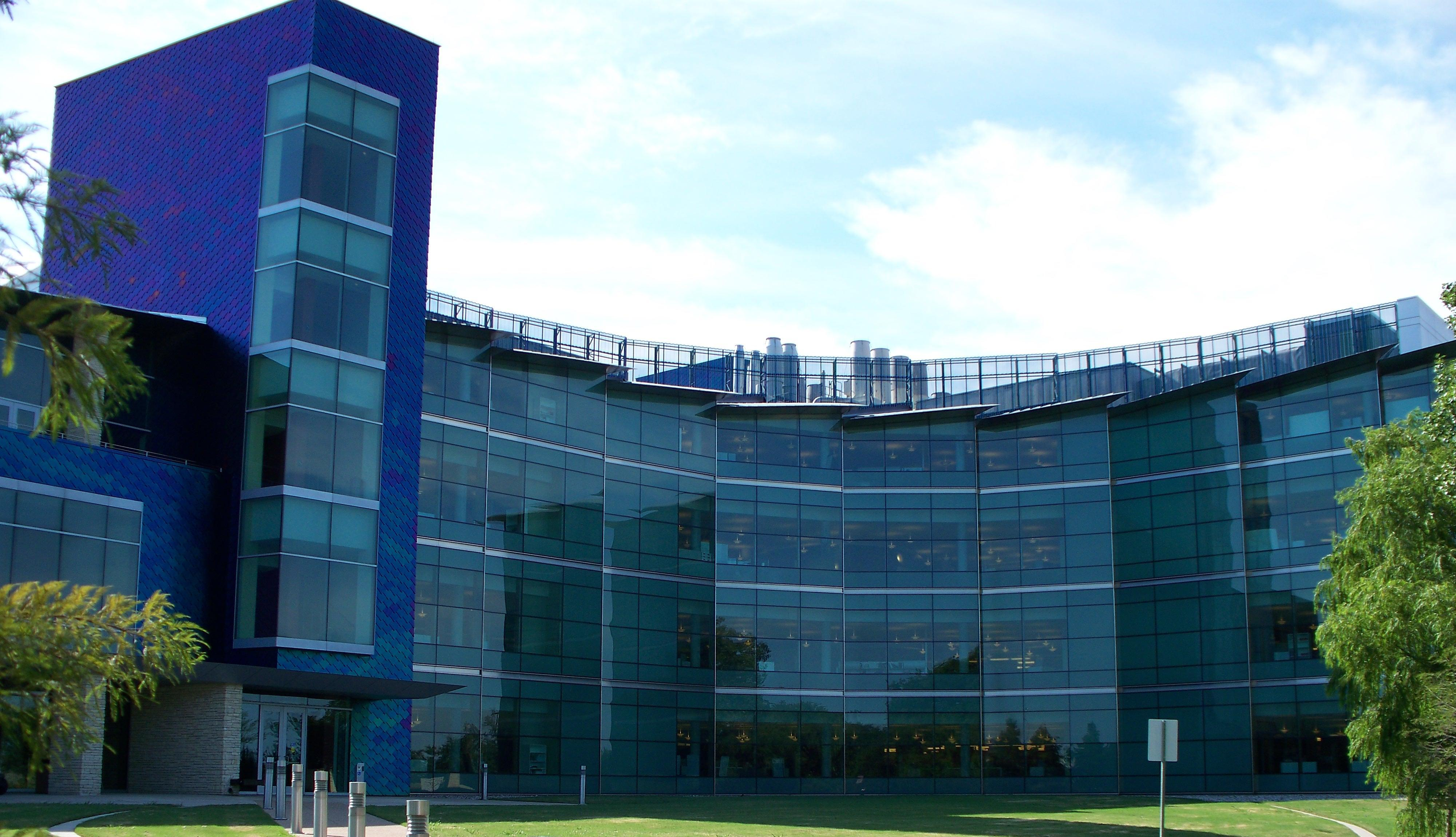
Natural Science and Engineering Research Laboratory

The Natural Science and Engineering Research Laboratory (NSERL), a four-story, 192,000-square-foot (17,800 m^{2}) research facility, was completed in December 2006 after two years of construction. Including ISO 7 cleanroom facilities, the $85 million building provides open floor plans that allows chemists, biologists, nanotechnologists, materials scientists and other specialists to conduct multidisciplinary research. The laboratory provides extensive wet lab, fabrication, instrumentation, and high performance computing facilities to foster biomedical engineering and nano-technology research. The Nanoelectronics Materials Laboratory, on the fourth floor, includes a system that allows researchers to deposit thin film materials one atomic layer at a time. In May 2011 a $3 million JEOL ARM200F scanning transmission electron microscope with an atomic resolution of 0.78 picometers, was added to the research laboratory, already home to two transmission electron microscopes.

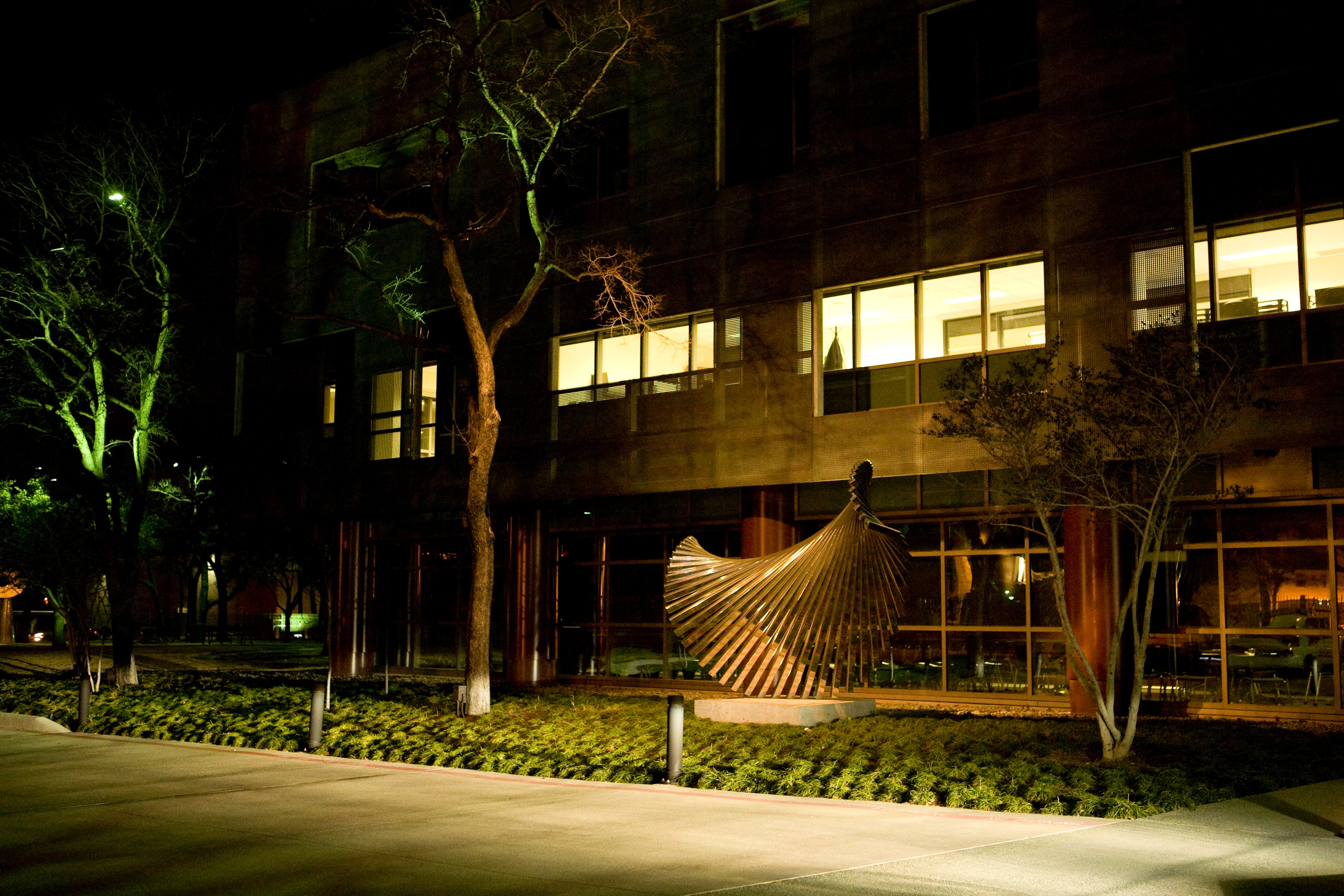
Center for BrainHealth

The Center for BrainHealth, both its own facility and part of the School of Behavioral and Brain Sciences, is a research institute with clinical interventions focused on brain health. The center is located near the UT Dallas' Callier Center for Communication Disorders and adjacent to the north campus of University of Texas Southwestern Medical Center in the city of Dallas. Brain research is concentrated on brain conditions, diseases, and disorders including, Attention Deficit Hyperactivity Disorder, autism, dementia, stroke, traumatic brain injury, and working memory.

The Callier Center for Communication Disorders became part of the University of Texas at Dallas in 1975 as part of the School of Human Development (now the School of Behavioral and Brain Sciences). Research, at the center, includes the causes, prevention, assessment and treatment of communication disorders and the facilities include laboratories for research in child language development and disorders, autism spectrum disorders, speech production, hearing disorders, neurogenic speech and language, cochlear implants and aural habilitation.

Additional ongoing research initiatives at UT Dallas include researchers overseeing the long-running British Election Study (BES). Harold Clarke, the Ashbel Smith professor of political science in the School of Economic, Political and Policy Sciences, and Marianne Stewart, professor of political science are the co-principal investigators for the study, which began in 1964 and is one of the world's oldest continuous political research projects. The other two co-investigators are David Sanders and Paul Whiteley of the University of Essex in England.

== Campus ==
=== Main campus ===
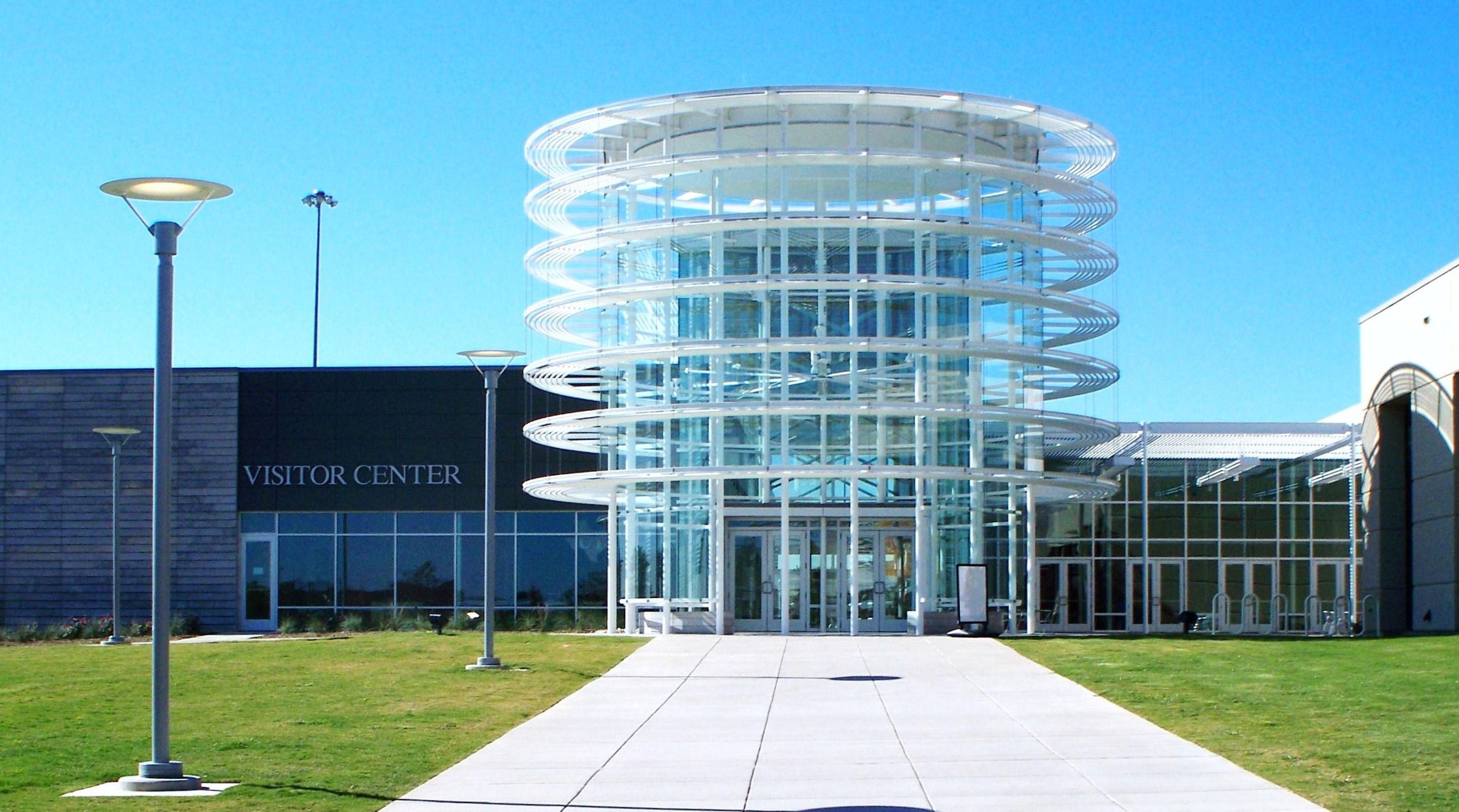
UTD Visitor Center

The main campus is located in Richardson, Texas. Small portions of that campus extend into Dallas. The main campus is next to Dallas's Telecom Corridor, 18 miles (29 km) north of downtown Dallas, on the boundary of Dallas and Collin counties. UT Dallas owns land in Richardson, Texas consisting of approximately 465 acres (1.88 km^{2}) for campus development and another 265 acres (1.07 km^{2}) adjacent to the campus. The Princeton Review's Guide to 332 Green Colleges: 2014 Edition recognized UTD for their green campus efforts.

While the main campus' address is officially within the jurisdiction of Richardson and Collin County, approximately one-third of the campus today (one-half in 1969) is located within Dallas County. This section contains major areas in the south end of campus, including the Visitor Center, Bookstore, the Naveen Jindal School of Management, Athletics District and facilities, half of the Founders Building, parking lots, and some on-campus student housing (Canyon Creek and University Village buildings 1, 2, and 3). When UT Dallas started growing in the 1960s, the university needed to coordinate with one of the cities for water, electricity, sewer, police, and fire services. Dallas agreed to let Richardson officially host the university because it did not have the ability or capacity to support UTD at the time (a situation similar to SMU and University Park). Today, UT Dallas and Richardson share a close relationship and have strongly supported each other's growth for the past 50 years.

=== Other locations ===
- Waterview Science & Technology Center and the Research and Operations Center, a leased building, is adjacent to the main campus and officially within Dallas city limits.
- Callier Center, consisting of 8 buildings, and the Center for BrainHealth, a single building, is adjacent to the University of Texas Southwestern Medical Center in the city of Dallas.
- Artist residency CentralTrak was located east of downtown Dallas one block away from Fair Park. It closed in 2017 due to a lease cancellation.
- The Crow Museum of Art, acquired by UT Dallas in January 2019, is located in the Arts District in Dallas.
- The Venture Development Center and Center for Emergent Novel Technology at the Innovation Quarter (CENT-IQ) will be located at the headquarters of the Innovation Quarter as part of a partnership between the City of Richardson and the University of Texas at Dallas to encourage innovation and entrepreneurship. A ribbon-cutting ceremony on September 19, 2022, to officially launch CENT-IQ that will be home to five multi-disciplinary research centers.
- The Athenaeum, a cultural district on the UT Dallas campus, opened its first phase in September 2024. It features a new home for the Crow Museum of Asian Art and a performance hall, establishing a significant arts and cultural hub for the university.
- TI Biomedical Engineering and Sciences Building: Dedicated on October 26, 2023, this 150,000-square-foot facility is located on the East Campus of UT Southwestern. Funded by a $120 million donation from Texas Instruments, it features advanced lab spaces and collaboration areas, aiming to enhance biomedical innovation and training at UT Dallas and UT Southwestern.

=== Architecture ===
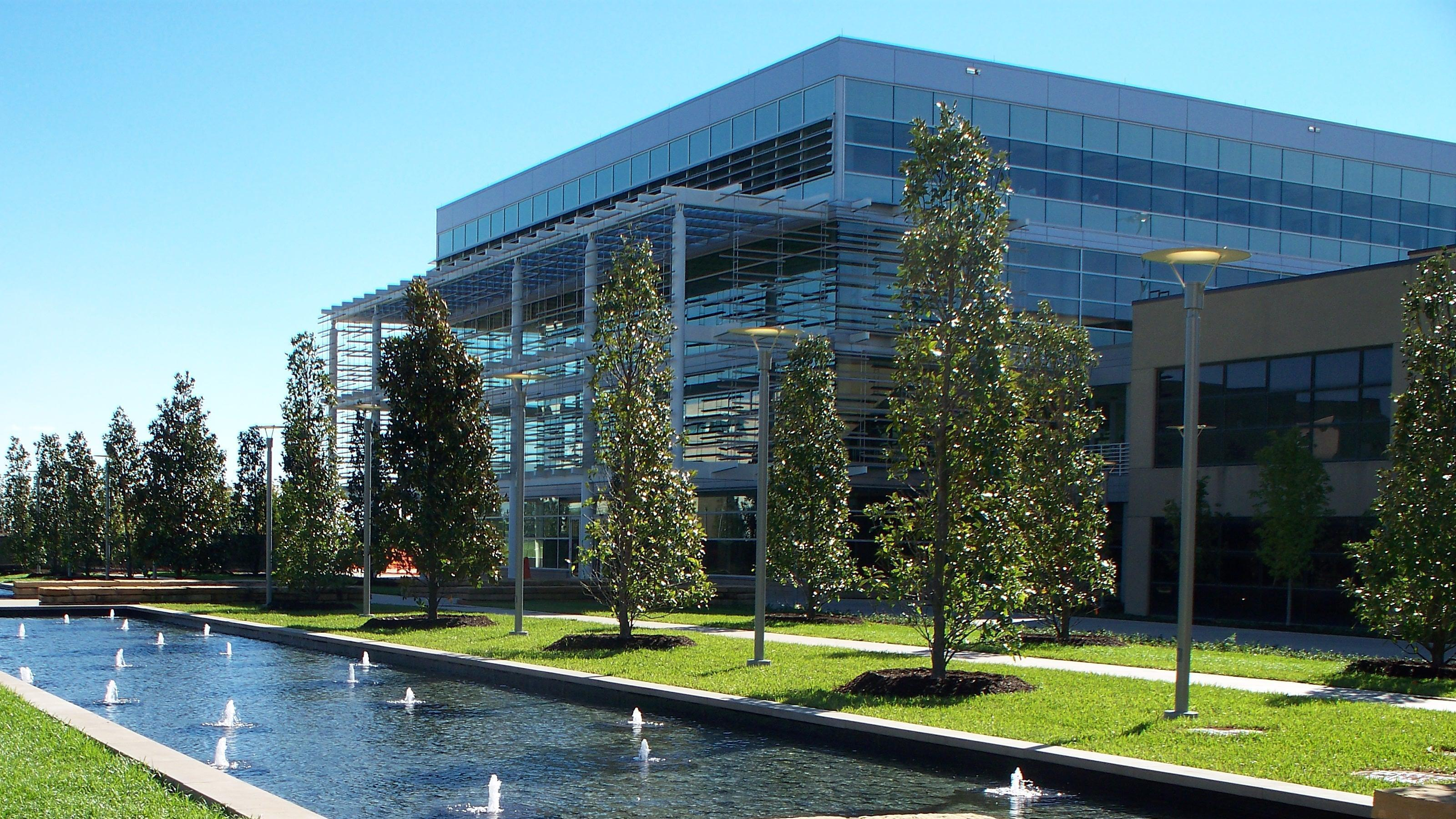
Student Services building

The first campus development plan (1971) called for brutalist-style concrete architecture, a monorail, and skywalks. While not everything was implemented, some of the original elements outlined do remain today. The overall modern look and feel of the campus was inspired by the founders' vision of a "college of the future" – intentionally straying far from the traditional "red-brick" styles of older universities.

Later architecture (early 21st century) exhibits late modern or postmodern features such as bronze glass, bronze aluminum frames, unadorned geometric shapes, unusual surfaces, and unorthodox layouts. This styling is seen in the Engineering and Computer Science West building, School of Management, Cecil and Ida Green Center, and Natural Science and Engineering Research Lab facility (called the Mermaid Building due to its colorful anodized shingles). To provide protection from inclement weather and extreme temperatures, many of the buildings on campus are connected by a series of elevated indoor walking paths also referred to as skybridges.

The Student Services building, completed in 2010, is the first academic structure in Texas to be rated a LEED Platinum facility by the United States Green Building Council.

=== Landscape ===
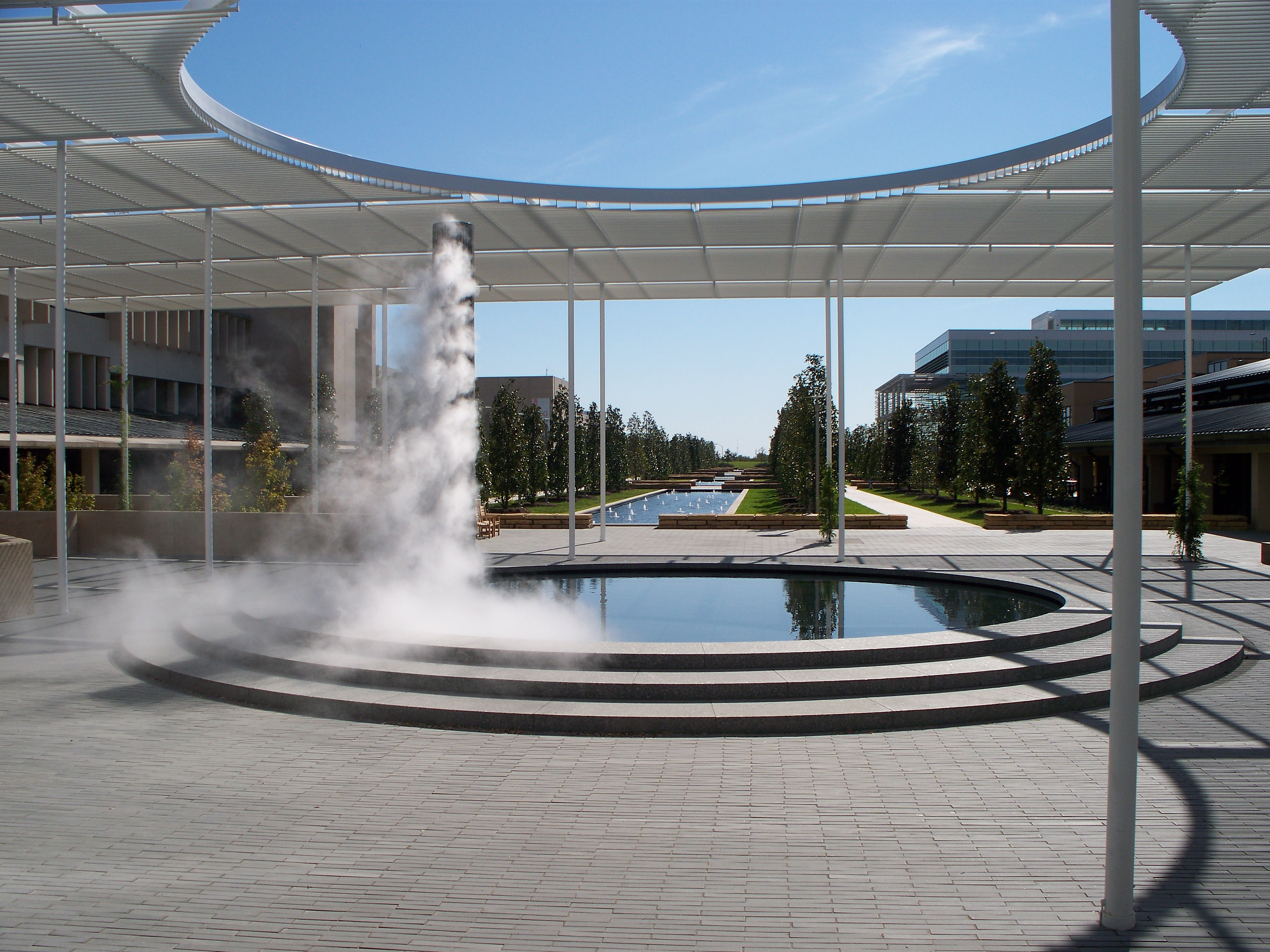
The Plinth, located between the McDermott Library (left) and the Student Union (right)

A $30 million Campus Landscape Enhancement Project, largely funded by Margaret McDermott (wife of UTD founder Eugene McDermott), was started in October 2008 and completed in late 2010. The project encompassed all aspects of landscape architecture from campus identity to pedestrian strategies, future growth patterns, sustainability and establishing a campus core. The first enhancement included the reforestation of the main entry drive with more than 5,000 native trees. Each tree was hand-picked and individually arranged by the landscape architect after study of native stands in Texas.

The next major enhancement included the commitment to a riparian corridor, consisting of a densely planted natural creek bed along the central entry median to the campus Allée. The main Mall (or 'Allée') includes 116 hand-picked columnar 'Claudia Wannamaker' Magnolias alongside five reflecting pools and four human-scale chess boards (to represent the achievements of the school's chess team). At the northern terminus of the Mall (between the McDermott Library and the Student Union) is a pavilion-sized plaza, referred to by many students as "The Plinth". The plaza includes a granite fountain complete with mist column, an overhead trellis covered in wisteria vines, and a temperature-modifying shade structure design.

The most recent Phase of the Campus Landscape Enhancement Project was completed in time for the fall 2021 semester. This phase included converting a section of Rutford Ave from North Loop Road to Franklyn Jenifer Drive into a 24-foot wide pedestrian-only promenade. Six brick signs matching that of the main entrance was also installed at major intersections and campus entrances. A bridge was also installed over Cottonwood Creek between Callier Center Richardson and the Bioengineering and Sciences Building which was finished in September 2021. A total of 1,200 trees were planted and enhancements were made to the Rock Garden behind the Founder Building.

=== Art museum ===
In November 2018, the university announced the donation of the Barrett Collection of Swiss Art, the largest collection of Swiss art outside of Switzerland. Shortly after, in January 2019, the family of Trammell and Margaret Crow, local real estate mogul, donated the entire collection of the Crow Museum of Asian Art to The University of Texas at Dallas, along with $23 million in support funding to help build a structure on the university campus to show more of the artworks. This donation was a decade in the making by the Director of the Center for Asian Studies and Dean of the then School of Arts and Humanities, Dennis M. Kratz.

With the need to build an art museum to hold these vast collections, Richard Brettell, founding director of the Edith O'Donnell Institute of Art History and major orchestrator of the two acquisitions, was heavily involved in the design process, which was designed by the Los Angeles-based architecture firm Morphosis, which is also designed the renowned Perot Museum of Nature and Science in Downtown Dallas

Located south of the Naveen Jindal School of Management and close to the main entrance of the university, groundbreaking for the two story 68, 459 sq ft Edith and Peter O’Donnell Jr. Athenaeum began on May 11, 2022, and is expected to be completed by 2024. The project is expected to cost $58 million, with around 55% of the cost being funded through university gifts. Upon completion, the Athenaeum will be the largest major art museum north of I-635.

== Student life ==
=== Activities ===
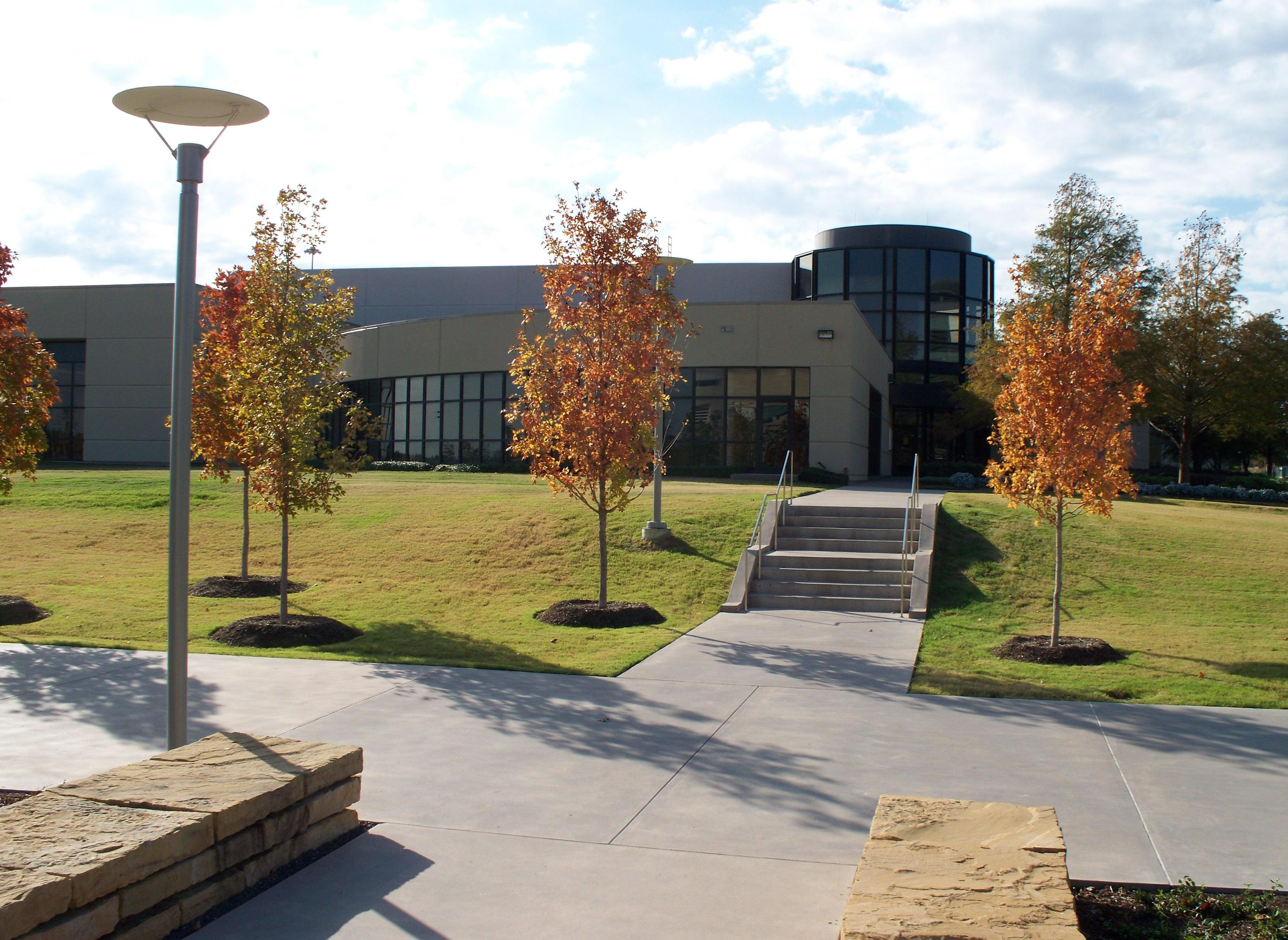
Activity Center

The University of Texas at Dallas has 300+ registered campus organizations, including fraternities and sororities. Traditional athletic sports are not a major focus of the institution.

UTD's 89,000-square-foot (8,300 m^{2}) Activity Center includes a fitness center, basketball courts, a multi-purpose room, and an indoor swimming pool. Also available are sand volleyball courts, soccer fields, tennis courts, softball fields, baseball fields and a disc golf course.

=== Recreation and education teams ===
==== Chess ====
The internationally ranked UT Dallas chess team was launched in 1996 under the direction of two-time president of the U.S. Chess Federation, Timothy Redman. The university recruits worldwide for its chess team and 24 Grandmasters and International Masters have played for UT Dallas from 1996 to 2018. The UTD chess team has won or tied for first place in the Pan-American Intercollegiate Chess Championship more than 10 times since 2000. As a result of the program's success, four human-sized chess boards were installed in the campus' Mall, now referred to as "Chess Plaza." The university offers chess scholarships to qualified student players and several full four-year tuition tournament-based scholarships.

Achievements include the following:

- UT Dallas has taken first place in eight of its 12 appearances at the Texas State College Championship and the UTD chess team has won or tied for first place in the Southwest Collegiate Championship for 2003, 2004, 2006, 2007, 2008, 2009, 2010, 2011, 2014, 2016.
- The UTD chess team has won the Transatlantic Cup in 2007, 2008, 2009, 2010, 2016, 2017, and 2018. They tied for first place in the 2011, 2012, 2014, and 2015 matches with the University of Belgrade. Since 2000, UTD's chess players have won or tied ten Pan American Intercollegiate Team Chess Championship titles.
- The UT Dallas chess team has competed in each consecutive Final Four of Chess tournaments starting in 2001 though 2018, winning or tying for first place five times. Since 2019, UT Dallas has made 16 total appearances in the 19 years the Final Four tournament has existed.
- The U.S. Chess Federation selected UT Dallas as the Chess College of the Year for 2012.

==== Debate ====
Established in the fall of 1996, UT Dallas Debate has consistently ranked in the top 25 debate programs nationally. Students engaged in college debate devote hundreds of hours per season researching and defending a specific policy resolution, in the process gaining a graduate-level understanding of complex social and political issues. UTD's Debate program is generally run under the Honors College and offers competitive scholarships to students. Since 2019, UTD has made 16 consecutive appearances at the National Debate Tournament, which is attended by the 78 best teams in the country.

Achievements include the following:

- Won the Cross Examination Debate Association's "Brady Lee Garrison Newcomer Sweepstakes Award" in spring 1997.
- UTD first qualified a team for the National Debate Tournament in 2004 and has qualified each year since. In 2004 the team also hosted its first annual "Fear and Loathing" tournament, with more than 325 participants, coaches, and judges in attendance.
- The UTD debate team placed in the top five at the American Debate Association national championships each year between 2009 and 2012.
- UTD placed in the Top 10 of the National Debate Tournament in 2016.
- In 2012 and 2018, the UTD debate team made it to the Sweet 16 of the Cross Examination Debate Association (CEDA) national tournament.
- The UTD debate team qualified and placed in the finals of the Cross Examination Debate Association (CEDA) national tournament in 2019. In the same year, the UTD speech team qualified for and placed at the American Forensic Association national tournament and the National Forensic Association national tournament.

==== Pre-law ====
The school fields teams in the pre-law competitions: Moot Court, Mock Trial and Mediation. UTD is one of the few schools in Texas to field teams in all three major undergraduate legal advocacy competitions.

Achievements include the following:

- In November 2009, the UT Dallas team won the National Mediation Tournament championship in the advocate/client division. The tournament was held at the John Marshall Law School in Chicago.
- In 2010, UTD students again placed first and second in the advocate/client division to win the Dan Stamatelos National Trophy for Advocacy. The tournament was held at the Drake University Law School and UT Dallas was the only school to place two teams to the final rounds.
- UTD received first, second and fourth place at the November 2010, South Central Regional Moot Court Championships. The University of Arkansas at Little Rock's, William H. Bowen School of Law was host to the 32 teams.
- UT Dallas Moot Court debate team placed first overall in the regional competition at the American Collegiate Moot Court Association National Tournament, hosted January 2012 at Chapman University in Orange, California.
- In 2013, one UT Dallas team reached the quarterfinals at the Southwest Regional Tournament, and another made it to the semifinals to earn a bid in the national tournament, hosted by the American Moot Court Association.
- In 2016, UTD won the International Intercollegiate Mediation Tournament and qualified for the American Collegiate Moot Court Association tournament in California.
- UTD qualified for the American Mock Trial Association's Opening Round Championship Series in 2018.

=== Greek life ===
The University of Texas at Dallas opened the Office of Fraternity and Sorority Life in 1992 with Kappa Sigma and Alpha Gamma Delta as the first fraternity and sorority on campus, respectively. Internal sources state that more than 1,000 students are involved in 26 Greek organizations as of fall 2019.

=== Student media ===
The Mercury has been the official student newspaper of the University of Texas at Dallas since 1980. It publishes 5,000 copies every other Monday during the fall and spring semesters, and every third Monday during the summer. It is distributed free around campus and at the UTD newsroom in the Student Union. The Mercury also publishes online at utdmercury.com. In April 2011, The Mercury won 12 awards at the 101st annual Texas Intercollegiate Press Association IPA convention. In September 2024, The Mercury's editorial board, management team, and staff went on strike to protest the removal of Gregorio Olivares Gutierrez as Editor-in-Chief of The Mercury and to demand his reinstatement by UTD's Student Media Operating Board. The team formed a new student paper, The Retrograde, which has been recognized by Student Government as the official student newspaper of UTD. The Mercury returned in November of 2025, alongside The Retrograde.

In 2004, another student print named A Modest Proposal (AMP) was formed. In contrast to The Mercury, which is almost all news articles, AMP is a magazine and features mostly editorial content. AMP is published once a month, eight times a year. Any student, faculty, or staff of UTD can contribute to the paper. Copies of AMP are available for free at the first of each month around the campus, and can also be downloaded in PDF format from their website. Radio UTD is the university's student-run, online-only, radio station.

In 2009, UTD TV, an internet-based campus TV station, was founded and launched by students. It webcasts a range of student-interest programs from campus news and amusing serial stories to student affairs coverage.

=== Residential housing ===
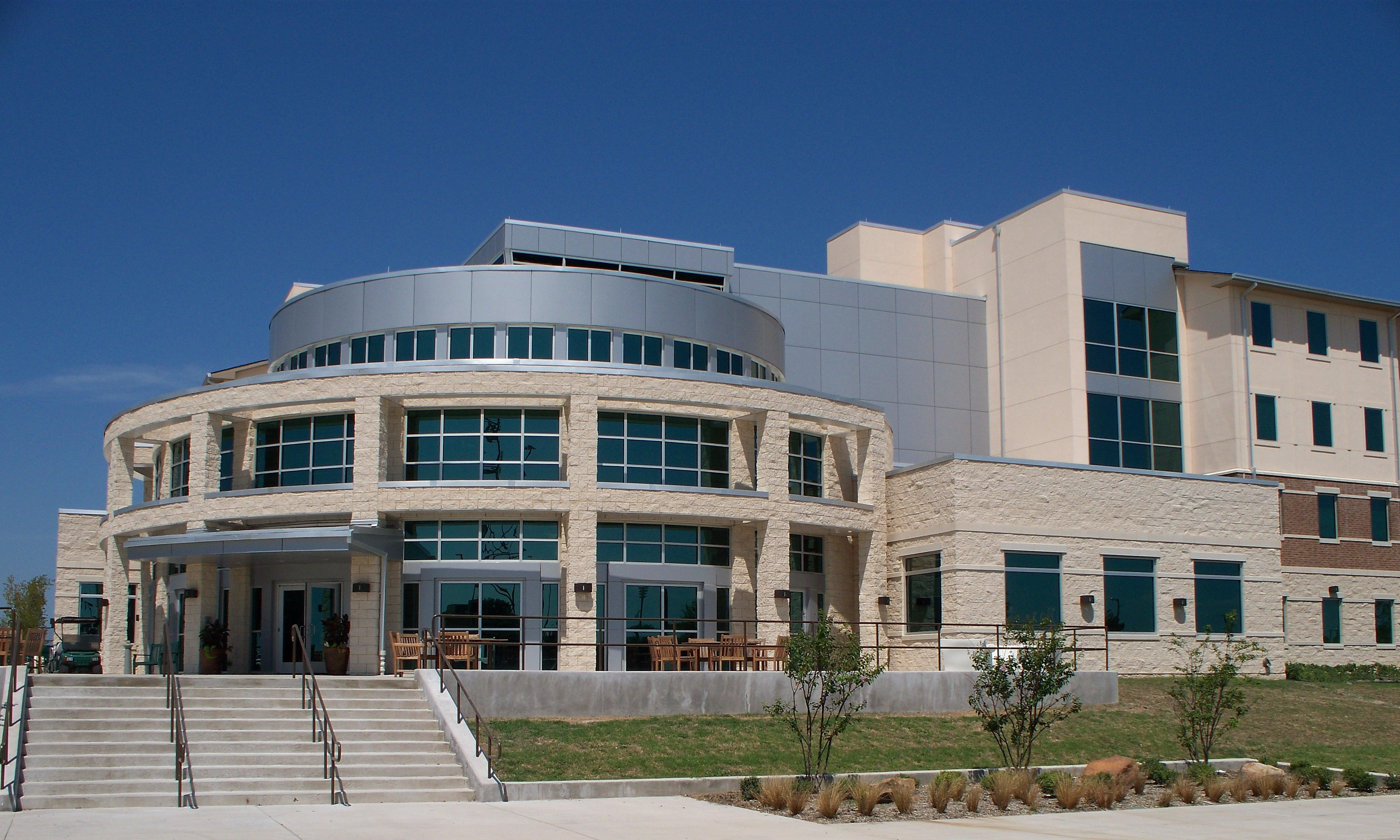
UTD Residence Hall South

On-campus housing for the 2015–2016 academic year consisted of the University Commons five residential halls and 1,237 apartments. The apartment buildings 1–37, which make up 696 units and buildings 38–67, which make up 541 units, are owned by the university and privately managed by American Campus Communities under the name University Village. Buildings 1–37, previously known as the Waterview Park Apartments, were owned by the Utley Foundation and purchased by UTD on July 1, 2013. Apartment floor plans vary from 1-bedroom to 4-bedroom units and amenities include swimming pools, volleyball courts, outdoor grills, and study centers. According to a UTD Mercury article on September 18, 2011, both graduate and upperclassman housing continues to be in short supply due to the increase in enrollment.

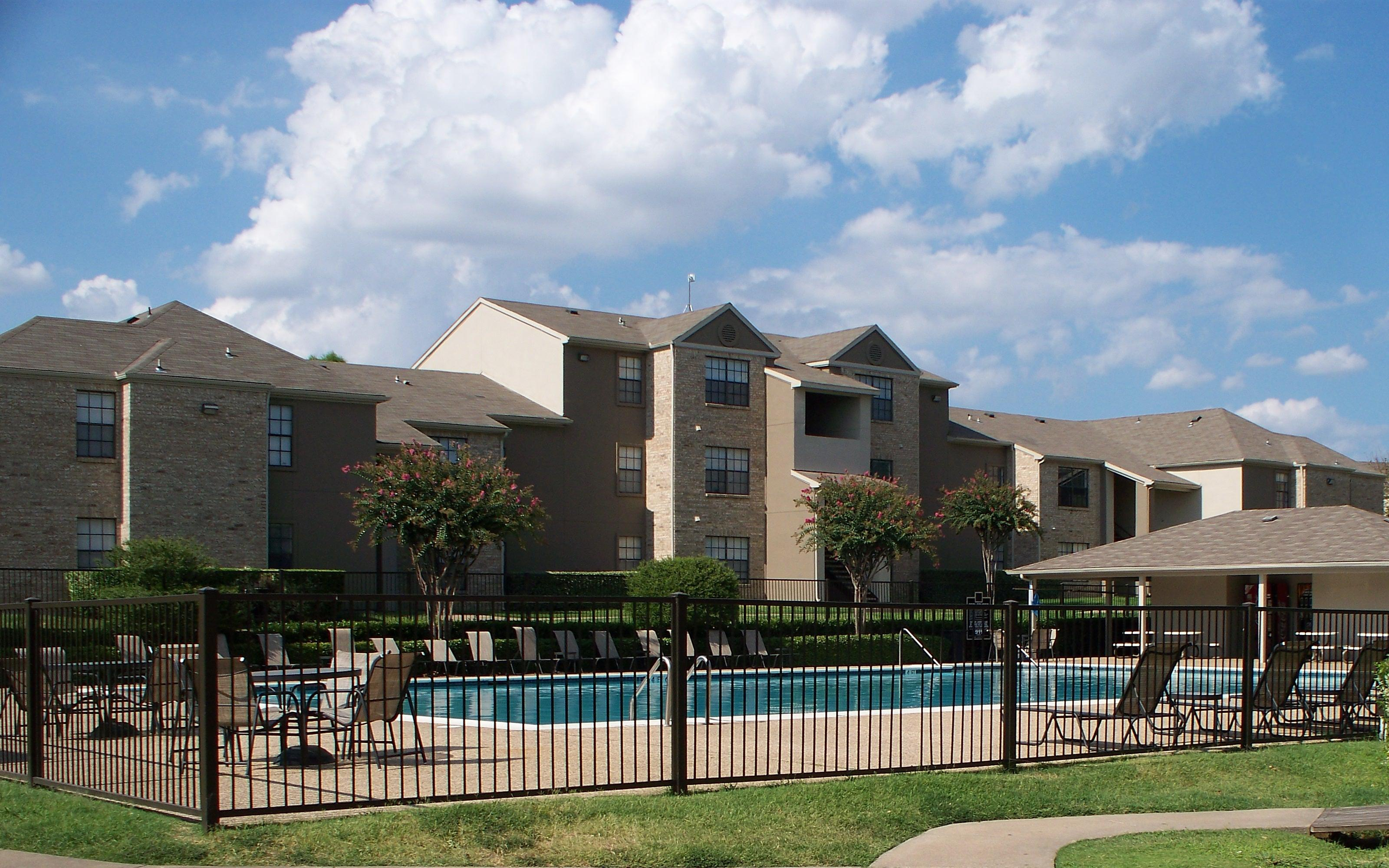
UTD Apartments

On August 12, 2009, a 148,000-square-foot (13,700 m^{2}) residence hall (Residence Hall South) opened, providing housing for 384 full-time freshmen residents and 16 peer advisers. The building includes a mix of three-bedroom, single-bath suites for freshmen and one-bedroom, one-bath units for peer advisers. On each wing and each floor are several communal study areas and the ground floor features a 1,800-square-foot (170 m^{2}) glass-enclosed rotunda with pool and ping-pong tables, large-screen televisions, couches and chairs. A second, 150,000-square-foot (14,000 m^{2}) residence hall, (Residence Hall North), was officially completed June 27, 2011, and a third freshman residence hall (Residence Hall Northwest) adjacent to the two existing halls was completed in August 2012. A fourth residence hall (Residence Hall Southwest) opened in time for the fall 2013 semester. Construction for a fifth residential facility (Residence Hall West) was started in July 2013 and completed in 2014. The 339,000-square-foot (31,500 m^{2}) 600-bed facility includes a dining hall with seating for 800 and a recreation center. Residence Hall West houses the Living Learning Communities program that groups students with similar interests and majors together.

Construction has begun on two new apartment-style housing complexes known as Phase VI and Phase VII. The two complexes will offer a total of 800 beds and are expected to open in time for the fall 2017 semester.

In 2015, co-developers Balfour Beatty Campus Solutions and Wynne/Jackson began construction of a private mixed-use development known as Northside on leased university land directly adjacent to the main campus. Opened in time for the fall 2016 semester, the development offers 600 beds through a mix of one-, two-, and three-bedroom apartments and townhomes. Northside also includes 20,000 square feet of space for retail and food vendors, bringing an integrated residential and retail complex to the edge of campus for the first time.

=== Dining ===
Students have multiple dining options, including commercial restaurants primarily within the Student Union, a traditional dining hall near the residence halls, and convenience stores within buildings. Commercial restaurants include Firehouse Subs, Chick-fil-A, Smoothie King, Halal Guys, Panda Express, Starbucks, and Einstein Bros. Bagels. The Student Union dining hall opened on August 12, 2009, in conjunction with the opening of the first residence hall and was later replaced by a new dining hall within the Residence Hall West complex. The former Student Union dining hall was later replaced by an extended food court area featuring an expanded Chick-fil-A and a Panda Express, among other options. The Student Union building houses The Pub which features a sit-down restaurant atmosphere. Beginning in the fall 2016 semester, UT Dallas Dining began hosting local food trucks on campus. All first-year students living on campus are required to purchase a meal plan; meal plans are optional for all other students who live on campus.

== Traditions ==
The student body is collectively known as the Comets, while the college's mascot is Temoc. The "Whoosh" salute is a way for students to show campus unity.

Resting in front of the Texas Instruments Plaza is the sculpture Jack, created in 1971 by artist Jim Love (1927–2005). Margaret McDermott, wife of UTD founder Eugene McDermott (1899–1973), presented the sculpture to the university in 1976.

=== Spirit Rocks ===
The Spirit Rocks were a set of three "free speech" rocks on campus where students could paint anything following loose rules. The rocks were painted frequently with political, event-related, and school spirit messages.

On October 16, 2023, student newspaper The Mercury reported on students spray painting Palestinian and Israeli flags and messages on the Spirit Rocks in response to the Gaza war. Students painted various messages in support of both countries, including "WE (Israel) ARE WINNING", "Free Palestine", "END OCCUPATION", "Terror ≠ 'Justice'", and "Zionism = Nazism". Dean of Students Amanda Smith said the support for both countries did not violate the rules of the Spirit Rocks. CBS Texas reported on the issue, calling the Spirit Rocks "a tense platform for politics with competing views about the violence in the Middle East".

On November 20, the Spirit Rocks were removed by Student Affairs executives for platforming "extended political discourse" without consulting the committee responsible for university policies. This sparked backlash from the student body, prompting protests attended by hundreds of students. Free speech advocacy group Foundation for Individual Rights and Expression condemned the university for the Spirit Rocks' removal. Students have since attempted to bring the Spirit Rocks back through Student Government, opinion articles, and artistic exhibitions.

== Athletics ==
UT Dallas is transitioning to NCAA Division II varsity athletics. It has competitive club teams and intramural sports teams. Athletic teams are known as the Comets, while the mascot is Temoc ("Temoc" is "comet" spelled backwards.)

=== Varsity ===
The University of Texas at Dallas' Varsity athletics program started when UTD provisionally joined the NCAA Division III and the American Southwest Conference (ASC) in 1998 and was granted full membership in the ASC in 2002. On July 20, 2023, the university announced it would move to NCAA Division II and join the Lone Star Conference. Varsity sports include baseball, basketball, cross country, esports, golf, soccer, softball, tennis, and volleyball. In total, 300 student athletes and 14 intercollegiate teams are officially supported by the university.

Gene Fitch, the university's vice president of student affairs, stated that UTD plans to open "the premier collegiate gaming center in the country" by the spring of 2025.

=== Intramural sports ===
UT Dallas has several intramural sports teams. These teams compete only within UTD, as all teams are organized groups of current students. While available sports and teams can vary each year, teams offered in spring 2019 included badminton, basketball, Battleship, cricket, esports, flag football, sand volleyball, swim, soccer, table tennis, tennis, ultimate frisbee, wiffleball, rock climbing and Xtreme dodgeball.

== Notable people ==
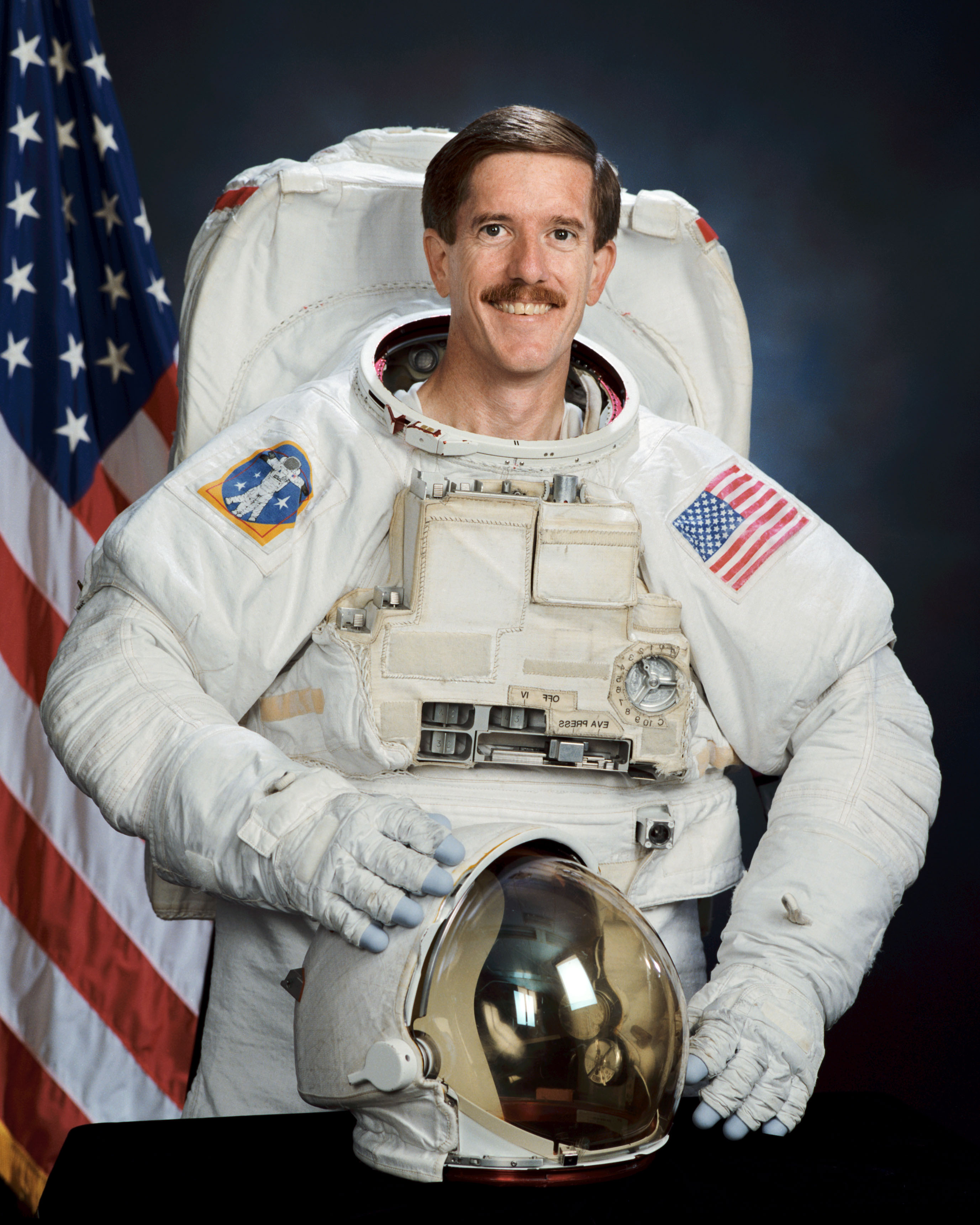
Astronaut James F. Reilly

Notable UT Dallas faculty, staff, and alumni include an Antarctic explorer, an astronaut, members of the National Academies, four Nobel laureates, a writer and folklorist, a member of India's Parliament, and the founder of the world's first molecular nanotechnology company.

== See also ==
- List of The University of Texas at Dallas people
