= List of glaciers of Ellsworth Land =

Following is a list of glaciers of Ellsworth Land in Antarctica. This list may not reflect recently named glaciers in Ellsworth Land.

- Aaron Glacier
- Acosta Glacier
- Ahrnsbrak Glacier
- Anchialus Glacier
- Arapya Glacier
- Aster Glacier
- Balish Glacier
- Bearman Glacier
- Bellisime Glacier
- Bender Glacier
- Berisad Glacier
- Bolgrad Glacier
- Branscomb Glacier
- Brook Glacier
- Bulbur Glacier
- Burdenis Glacier
- Cairns Glacier
- Carey Glacier
- Cervellati Glacier
- Chavez Glacier
- Cooke Glacier
- Cox Glacier
- Craft Glacier
- Crosswell Glacier
- Dater Glacier
- Deadmond Glacier
- Della Pia Glacier
- Delyo Glacier
- Divdyadovo Glacier
- Dobbratz Glacier
- Donnellan Glacier
- Drama Glacier
- Driscoll Glacier
- Ellen Glacier
- Embree Glacier
- Exum Glacier
- Fendorf Glacier
- Flanagan Glacier
- Foley Glacier
- Fonfon Glacier
- Frankenfield Glacier
- Gabare Glacier
- Gerila Glacier
- Gildea Glacier
- Giles Glacier
- Goff Glacier
- Goodell Glacier
- Gopher Glacier
- Gowan Glacier
- Grimes Glacier
- Guerrero Glacier
- Hale Glacier
- Hansen Glacier
- Haskell Glacier
- Henderson Glacier
- Hinkley Glacier
- Hlubeck Glacier
- Hough Glacier
- Hudman Glacier
- Hyde Glacier
- Isbrecht Glacier
- Kannheiser Glacier
- Karasura Glacier
- Kopsis Glacier
- Kornicker Glacier
- Lardeya Ice Piedmont
- Levko Glacier
- Litz Glacier
- Long Glacier
- Lucchitta Glacier
- Mahaffey Glacier
- Marck Glacier
- Marsa Glacier
- Mincer Glacier
- Minnesota Glacier
- Morelli Glacier
- Myers Glacier
- Newcomer Glacier
- Nimitz Glacier
- Obelya Glacier
- Orizari Glacier
- Padala Glacier
- Patleyna Glacier
- Patton Glacier
- Payne Glacier
- Pelter Glacier
- Plummer Glacier
- Pulpudeva Glacier
- Ramorino Glacier
- Ranuli Ice Piedmont
- Razboyna Glacier
- Remington Glacier
- Rennell Glacier
- Rexford Glacier
- Rignot Glacier
- Robbins Glacier
- Roché Glacier
- Rochray Glacier
- Rosanova Glacier
- Rumyana Glacier
- Sabazios Glacier
- Saltzman Glacier
- Savage Glacier
- Schanz Glacier
- Schmidt Glacier
- Schneider Glacier
- Seal Glacier
- Sessums Glacier
- Severinghaus Glacier
- Sikorski Glacier
- Sirma Glacier
- Skaklya Glacier
- Sowers Glacier
- Splettstoesser Glacier
- Stapleton Glacier
- Strinava Glacier
- Thomas Glacier
- Thomson Glacier
- Tulaczyk Glacier
- Union Glacier
- Valoga Glacier
- Velasco Glacier
- Vicha Glacier
- Vidul Glacier
- Vit Ice Piedmont
- Walk Glacier
- Warr Glacier
- Webster Glacier
- Wessbecher Glacier
- Yamen Glacier
- Young Glacier
- Zapol Glacier
- Zhenda Glacier
- Zinberg Glacier
