= Memolli Nunatak =

Mountain peak in Antarctica

Location of Sentinel Range in Western Antarctica.

Map of northern Sentinel Range.

Memolli Nunatak (Bulgarian: нунатак Мемоли, ‘Nunatak Memolli’ \'nu-na-tak 'me-mo-li\) is the peak in Ellsworth Mountains, Antarctica rising to 2136 m at the end of the side ridge that trends 14.3 km northwestwards from the peak standing on the main crest of north-central Sentinel Range just north of Mount Hale. It has steep and ice-free east and south slopes.

The nunatak is named after Mariano Arnaldo Memolli, Director of the Argentine National Antarctic Directorate, for his support for the Bulgarian Antarctic programme.

== Location ==
Memolli Nunatak is located at 78°00′58.6″S 86°34′20″W, which is 13.73 km west of Mount Goldthwait, 1.74 km north-northwest of Silyanov Peak, 11.35 km east-northeast of Kovil Nunatak, 22.1 km southeast of Helfert Nunatak and 11.8 km south-southwest of Mursalitsa Peak. US mapping in 1961.

== Maps ==
- Newcomer Glacier. Scale 1:250 000 topographic map. Reston, Virginia: US Geological Survey, 1961.
- Antarctic Digital Database (ADD). Scale 1:250000 topographic map of Antarctica. Scientific Committee on Antarctic Research (SCAR). Since 1993, regularly updated.
