= Mount Press =

Mountain in Ellsworth Land, Antarctica

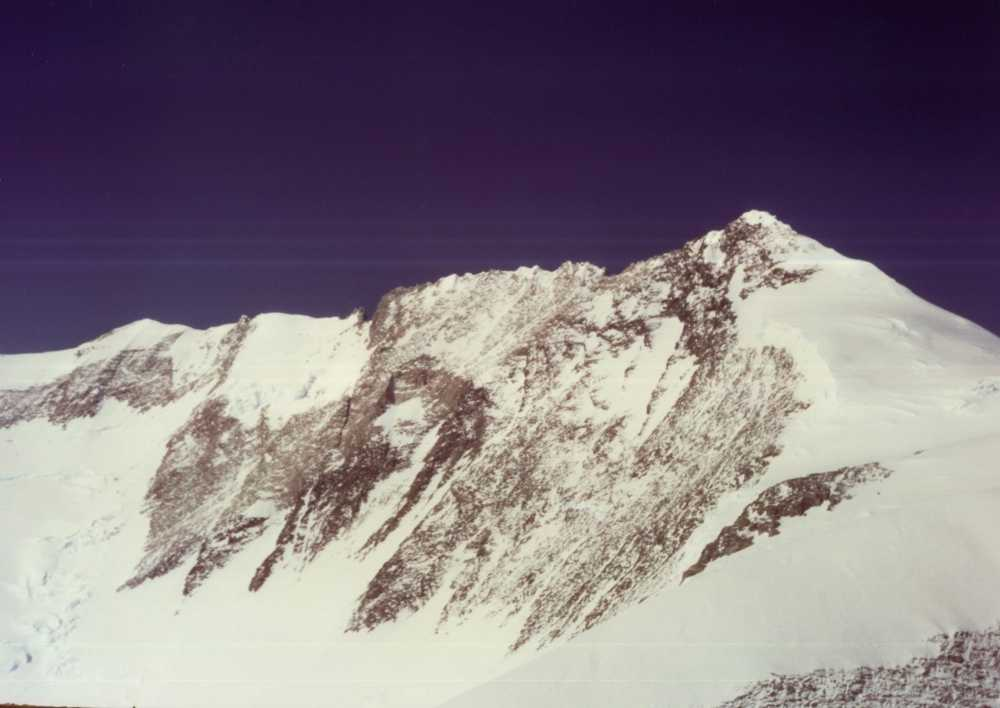
Mount Press

Location of Sentinel Range in Western Antarctica.

Sentinel Range map

Mount Press is a peak rising to 3,830 m (12,570 ft) in the north-central Sentinel Range in Ellsworth Mountains, Antarctica. It is linked to Eyer Peak by Zvegor Saddle, and surmounts Embree Glacier to the north and Ellen Glacier to the southeast. Mount Press is the summit of Probuda Ridge, and was first ascended by the American Jed Brown and the Chileans Camilo Rada and Maria Paz 'Pachi' Ibarra on 31 December 2006.

The peak is named for Frank Press, vice chairman of the technical panel on glaciology of the U.S. National Committee for the IGY; later (1977- ) White House Science Advisor.

== Location ==
Mount Press is located at (78°07′21″S 85°54′24″W), which is 4.42 km (2.75 mi) north-northeast of Eyer Peak, 8.78 km (5.46 mi) northeast of Mount Anderson, 7.19 km (4.47 mi) east by north of Mount Davis and 3 km (1.9 mi) south by west of Mount Todd. Mapped by the Marie Byrd Land Traverse Party (1957–58) led by Charles R. Bentley, updated US mapping in 1988 and by Gildea (by GPS) in 2006.

== See also ==
- Mountains in Antarctica

== Maps ==
- Vinson Massif. Scale 1:250 000 topographic map. Reston, Virginia: US Geological Survey, 1988.
- D. Gildea and C. Rada. Vinson Massif and the Sentinel Range. Scale 1:50 000 topographic map. Omega Foundation, 2007.
- Antarctic Digital Database (ADD). Scale 1:250000 topographic map of Antarctica. Scientific Committee on Antarctic Research (SCAR). Since 1993, regularly updated.
