= Skafida Peak =

Mountain in Antarctica

Location of Sentinel Range in Western Antarctica.

Map of northern Sentinel Range.

Skafida Peak (Bulgarian: връх Скафида, romanized: vrah Skafida, IPA: [ˈvrɤx skɐˈfidɐ]) is the peak rising to 2071 m near the north end of the main ridge of Sentinel Range in Ellsworth Mountains, Antarctica. It has steep and partly ice-free east and south slopes, and surmounts Newcomer Glacier to the east. The peak is named after the medieval fortress of Skafida in Southeastern Bulgaria.

== Location ==
Skafida Peak is located at 77°42′29.8″S 86°32′23″W, which is 2.43 km southeast of MacDonald Peak, 11.8 km west-southwest of Mount Cornwell in Gromshin Heights, 6.2 km northwest of Mount Crawford, 12.1 km north-northeast of Arzos Peak and 12.3 km east-northeast of Fisher Nunatak. US mapping in 1961.

== Maps ==
- Newcomer Glacier. Scale 1:250 000 topographic map. Reston, Virginia: US Geological Survey, 1961.
- Antarctic Digital Database (ADD). Scale 1:250000 topographic map of Antarctica. Scientific Committee on Antarctic Research (SCAR). Since 1993, regularly updated.
