= Galicia Peak =

Mountain in Antarctica

Galicia Point
- Location within Antarctica

Highest point
- Elevation: 4,480 m (14,700 ft)
- Coordinates: 78°30′30″S 85°42′00″W

Geography
- Location: Antarctica
- Parent range: Sentinel Range

Galicia Point is the peak rising to 4480 m in Vinson Massif, Sentinel Range in Ellsworth Mountains, Antarctica, and surmounting Jacobsen Valley to the east and Branscomb Glacier to the north and west.

The peak is named after the Spanish region of Galicia in connection with the peak's ascent by the Spaniard Miguel Ángel Vidal on 28 December 2004.

== Location ==
Galicia Peak is located at 78°30′30″S 85°42′00″W, which is 5.02 km south of Mount Shinn (4661 m), 2.62 km north-northwest of the summit Mount Vinson (4892 m), 840 m north of Branscomb Peak (4520 m) and 5.5 km east-southeast of Knutzen Peak (3373 m). US mapping in 1961, 1988 and 2007.

== See also ==
- Mountains in Antarctica

== Maps ==
Location of Sentinel Range in Western Antarctica.

Sentinel Range map.

- Vinson Massif. Scale 1:250 000 topographic map. Reston, Virginia: US Geological Survey, 1988.
- D. Gildea and C. Rada. Vinson Massif and the Sentinel Range. Scale 1:50 000 topographic map. Omega Foundation, 2007.
- Antarctic Digital Database (ADD). Scale 1:250000 topographic map of Antarctica. Scientific Committee on Antarctic Research (SCAR). Since 1993, regularly updated.
