= Beadnos Nunatak =

Location of Sentinel Range in Western Antarctica.

Map of northern Sentinel Range.

Beadnos Nunatak (Bulgarian: нунатак Беаднос, ‘Nunatak Beadnos’ \'nu-na-tak be-'ad-nos\) is the partly ice-free hill of elevation 2190 m projecting from the ice cap west of north-central Sentinel Range in Ellsworth Mountains, Antarctica. It is named after the medieval fortress of Beadnos in Southern Bulgaria.

== Location ==
Beadnos Nunatak is located at 77°57′59″S 87°13′02″W, which is 6.64 km southeast of Helfert Nunatak, 20.78 km west-southwest of Mursalitsa Peak, 29 km west of Mount Dalrymple and 9 km northwest of Kovil Nunatak. US mapping in 1961.

== Maps ==
- Newcomer Glacier. Scale 1:250 000 topographic map. Reston, Virginia: US Geological Survey, 1961.
- Antarctic Digital Database (ADD). Scale 1:250000 topographic map of Antarctica. Scientific Committee on Antarctic Research (SCAR). Since 1993, regularly updated.
