= Podgore Saddle =

Location of Sentinel Range in Western Antarctica.

Sentinel Range map.

Podgore Saddle (Bulgarian: седловина Подгоре, ‘Sedlovina Podgore’ \se-dlo-vi-'na pod-'go-re\) is the ice-covered flat saddle of elevation 2497 m linking Tyree Ridge to Bearskin Ridge on the east side of Sentinel Range in Ellsworth Mountains, Antarctica. It is part of the glacial divide between Patton Glacier and Crosswell Glacier.

The feature is named after the settlement of Podgore in northwestern Bulgaria.

== Location ==
Podgore Saddle is located at 78°21′52″S 85°41′05″W, which is 2 km west-southwest of Mount Bearskin, 6.35 km northeast of Mount Tyree, and 8.4 km southeast of Evans Peak. US mapping in 1988.

== Maps ==
- Vinson Massif. Scale 1:250 000 topographic map. Reston, Virginia: US Geological Survey, 1988.
- Antarctic Digital Database (ADD). Scale 1:250000 topographic map of Antarctica. Scientific Committee on Antarctic Research (SCAR). Since 1993, regularly updated.
