= Silyanov Peak =

Peak in Antarctica

Location of Sentinel Range in Western Antarctica.

Map of northern Sentinel Range.

Silyanov Peak (Bulgarian: Силянов връх, romanized: Silyanov vrah, IPA: [siˈʎanov ˈvrɤx]) is the sharp peak in Ellsworth Mountains, Antarctica rising to 2235 m near the end of the side ridge that trends 14.3 km from the peak standing on the main crest of north-central Sentinel Range just north of Mount Hale northwestwards to Memolli Nunatak. It has steep and mostly ice-free east and southwest slopes.

The peak is named after the Bulgarian revolutionary, historian and journalist Hristo Silyanov (1880–1939).

== Location ==
Silyanov Peak is located at 78°01′51.8″S 86°32′52″W, which is 15.02 km southwest of Mount Dalrymple, 10.07 km west of Ahrida Peak, 11.43 km northwest of Mount Hale, 10.36 km north of Mount Hubley, 11.65 km east of Kovil Nunatak and 1.74 km south-southeast of Memolli Nunatak. US mapping in 1961.

== Maps ==
- Newcomer Glacier. Scale 1:250 000 topographic map. Reston, Virginia: US Geological Survey, 1961.
- Antarctic Digital Database (ADD). Scale 1:250000 topographic map of Antarctica. Scientific Committee on Antarctic Research (SCAR). Since 1993, regularly updated.
