= Hariton Peak =

Mountain in Antarctica

Location of Sentinel Range in Western Antarctica.

Map of northern Sentinel Range.

Hariton Peak (Bulgarian: връх Харитон, romanized: vrah Hariton, IPA: [ˈvrɤx xɐriˈtɔn]) is the rocky peak rising to 1690 m near the north end of Sentinel Range in Ellsworth Mountains, Antarctica. It is named after Pop (Priest) Hariton (Hariton Halachev, 1835–1876), a leader of the 1876 April Uprising for Bulgarian independence.

== Location ==
Hariton Peak is located at 77°26′37″S 86°18′27″W, which is 1.68 km northeast of Mount Lymburner, 6.6 km south of Mount Liavaag and 8.25 km west-northwest of Mount Weems. US mapping in 1961.

== See also ==
- Mountains in Antarctica

== Maps ==
- Newcomer Glacier. Scale 1:250 000 topographic map. Reston, Virginia: US Geological Survey, 1961.
- Antarctic Digital Database (ADD). Scale 1:250000 topographic map of Antarctica. Scientific Committee on Antarctic Research (SCAR). Since 1993, regularly updated.
