= Pastrogor Peak =

Mountain in Ellsworth Land, Antarctica

Location of Sentinel Range in Western Antarctica.

Map of northern Sentinel Range.

Pastrogor Peak (Bulgarian: връх Пъстрогор, romanized: vrah Pastrogor, IPA: [ˈvrɤx pɐstroˈɡɔr]) is the partly ice-free peak rising to 1289 m near the north end of Sentinel Range in Ellsworth Mountains, Antarctica. It is named after the settlement of Pastrogor in Southern Bulgaria.

== Location ==
Pastrogor Peak is located at 77°23′38″S 86°01′27″W, which is 4.17 km north of Nell Peak, 7.22 km east of Mount Liavaag and 10.22 km south of Lanz Peak. US mapping in 1961.

== See also ==
- Mountains in Antarctica

== Maps ==
- Newcomer Glacier. Scale 1:250 000 topographic map. Reston, Virginia: US Geological Survey, 1961.
- Antarctic Digital Database (ADD). Scale 1:250000 topographic map of Antarctica. Scientific Committee on Antarctic Research (SCAR). Since 1993, regularly updated.
