= Mount Shear =

Mountain in Ellsworth Land, Antarctica

Location of Sentinel Range in Western Antarctica.

Central and southern Sentinel Range map.

Mount Shear (78°20′S 86°8′W) is a mountain over 4,000 m, standing 4 miles (6 km) northwest of Mount Tyree in the Sentinel Range, Ellsworth Mountains, Antarctica. It surmounts Patton Glacier to the northeast. The peak was discovered by the Marie Byrd Land Traverse Party (1957–58) led by Charles R. Bentley, and was named for James A. Shear, a scientific leader at Hallett Station during the IGY in 1957.

== Maps ==
- Vinson Massif. Scale 1:250 000 topographic map. Reston, Virginia: US Geological Survey, 1988.
- Antarctic Digital Database (ADD). Scale 1:250000 topographic map of Antarctica. Scientific Committee on Antarctic Research (SCAR). Since 1993, regularly updated.
