= Valchan Peak =

Sharp rocky peak in Ellsworth Mountains, Antarctica

Location of Sentinel Range in Western Antarctica.

Map of Sentinel Range.

Valchan Peak (Bulgarian: Вълчанов връх, romanized: Valchanov vrah, IPA: [vɐɫˈt͡ʃanov ˈvrɤx]) is the sharp rocky peak in Ellsworth Mountains, Antarctica rising to 2750 m on the side ridge that trends 15 km from Mount Bentley on the main crest of north-central Sentinel Range west-northwest to Mount Hubley.

The peak is named after the Bulgarian rebel leader Valchan Voyvoda (Valchan Pandurski, 1775–1863).

== Location ==
Valchan Peak is located at 78°08′33.3″S 86°25′14″W, which is 6.17 km east-southeast of Mount Hubley, 5.73 km south-southwest of Strahil Peak, 5.1 km southwest of Mount Hale and 5.6 km west by north of Mount Bentley.

== Maps ==
- Antarctic Digital Database (ADD). Scale 1:250000 topographic map of Antarctica. Scientific Committee on Antarctic Research (SCAR). Since 1993, regularly updated.
