= Nell Peak =

Mountain in Ellsworth Land, Antarctica

Location of Sentinel Range in Western Antarctica.

Map of northern Sentinel Range.

Nell Peak (Bulgarian: връх Нел, romanized: vrah Nel, IPA: [ˈvrɤx ˈnɛɫ]) is the partly ice-free peak rising to 1432 m near the north end of Sentinel Range in Ellsworth Mountains, Antarctica. It is named after the British geologist Philip Nell, a member of the joint BAS-Bulgarian field party on Alexander Island in the 1987/88 season.

== Location ==
Nell Peak is located at 77°25′50.5″S 85°59′39″W, which is 4.93 km north of Mount Weems, 9.07 km east-northeast of Mount Lymburner, 9.4 km southeast of Mount Liavaag and 14.4 km south of Lanz Peak. US mapping in 1961.

== See also ==
- Mountains in Antarctica

== Maps ==
- Newcomer Glacier. Scale 1:250 000 topographic map. Reston, Virginia: US Geological Survey, 1961.
- Antarctic Digital Database (ADD). Scale 1:250000 topographic map of Antarctica. Scientific Committee on Antarctic Research (SCAR). Since 1993, regularly updated.
