= Mount Todd =

Mountain in Ellsworth Land, Antarctica

Location of Sentinel Range in Western Antarctica.

Sentinel Range map.

Mount Todd is a peak rising to 3,600 m at the north extremity of Probuda Ridge in north-central Sentinel Range, Ellsworth Mountains in Antarctica. It surmounts Embree Glacier to the west, Patleyna Glacier to the northeast and Ellen Glacier to the south-southeast.

The peak was named in 1984 by the Advisory Committee on Antarctic Names (US-ACAN) after Edward P. Todd, a physicist for the National Science Foundation from 1963 to 1984, and the director of the Division of Polar Programs of the National Science Foundation (NSF) from 1977 to 1984. Todd also had responsibility for the development of the U.S. Antarctic Research Program.

== Location ==
Todd Peak is located at 78°05′39″S 85°52′39″W, which is 3 km north by east of Mount Press and 8.65 east-northeast of Mount Hale. It was mapped by the United States Geological Survey (USGS) from surveys and U.S. Navy aerial photography from 1957 to 1960. The mapping was updated in 1988.

== Maps ==
- Vinson Massif. Scale 1:250 000 topographic map. Reston, Virginia: US Geological Survey, 1988.
- Antarctic Digital Database (ADD). Scale 1:250000 topographic map of Antarctica. Scientific Committee on Antarctic Research (SCAR). Since 1993, regularly updated.
