= MacDonald Peak =

Mountain in Antarctica

Coordinates: 77°40′S 86°40′W

Location of Sentinel Range in Western Antarctica.

Northern Sentinel Range map.

MacDonald Peak is a peak rising to 1,940 metres (6,360 ft) midway between Shockey Peak and Mount Crawford near the north end of the main ridge of the Sentinel Range, Antarctica. It was discovered by Lincoln Ellsworth on his trans-Antarctic flight of November 23, 1935, and was named by the Advisory Committee on Antarctic Names (US-ACAN) in 1961 for William R. MacDonald of the Branch of Special Maps in the United States Geological Survey (USGS) who prepared the 1962 map of this range. Subsequently, MacDonald participated in numerous expeditions to Antarctica to supervise aerial photography used in preparing USGS maps of the continent. At the time of his death in 1977 he was Chief of the Branch of International Activities in the USGS and a member of the US-ACAN, part of the U.S. Board on Geographic Names.

== See also ==
- Mountains in Antarctica
