= Zalmoxis Peak =

Mountain in Bearskin Ridge, Ellsworth Mountains, Antarctica

Location of Sentinel Range in Western Antarctica.

Sentinel Range map.

Zalmoxis Peak (Bulgarian: връх Залмоксис, romanized: vrah Zalmoksis, IPA: [ˈvrɤɣ zɐɫˈmɔksis]) is the rocky peak rising to 2625 m in Bearskin Ridge on the east side of Sentinel Range in Ellsworth Mountains, Antarctica. It is surmounting Patton Glacier to the northwest and Crosswell Glacier to the southeast.

The feature is named after the mythical Thracian king and deity Zalmoxis.

== Location ==
Zalmoxis Peak is located at 78°20′18″S 85°31′00″W, which is 2.4 km northeast of Mount Bearskin, 7.9 km south of Mount Jumper, and 8.8 km west-southwest of Mamarchev Peak. US mapping in 1988.

== Maps ==
- Vinson Massif. Scale 1:250 000 topographic map. Reston, Virginia: US Geological Survey, 1988.
- Antarctic Digital Database (ADD). Scale 1:250000 topographic map of Antarctica. Scientific Committee on Antarctic Research (SCAR). Since 1993, regularly updated.
