= Príncipe de Asturias Peak =

Mountain in Antarctica

Location of Sentinel Range in Western Antarctica.

Sentinel Range map.

Príncipe de Asturias Peak (Bulgarian: връх Принсипе де Астуриас, romanized: vrah Prinsipe de Asturias, IPA: [ˈvrɤx ˈprinsipɛ dɛ ɐsˈturiɐs]; Spanish: Pico del Príncipe de Asturias, IPA: [ˈpiko ðel ˈpɾinθipe ðe asˈtuɾjas]) is the peak rising to 4498 m in Vinson Massif, Sentinel Range in Ellsworth Mountains, Antarctica, and surmounting Branscomb Glacier to the west-northwest, Roché Glacier to the north and Tulaczyk Glacier to the southwest.

The peak is named for the Prince of Asturias in connection with the peak's first ascent made by the Spaniards Manuel Álvarez and Alfonso Juez on 23 January 1995.

== Location ==
Príncipe de Asturias Peak is located at 78°32′50″S 85°42′32″W, which is 3.32 km southwest of the summit Mount Vinson (4892 m), 1.32 km west of Silverstein Peak (4790 m), 5.1 km northeast of Brichebor Peak (2900 m), 7.68 km southeast of Knutzen Peak (3373 m) and 3.64 km south of Branscomb Peak (4520 m). US mapping in 1961, 1988 and 2007.

== See also ==
- Mountains in Antarctica

== Maps ==
- Vinson Massif. Scale 1:250 000 topographic map. Reston, Virginia: US Geological Survey, 1988.
- D. Gildea and C. Rada. Vinson Massif and the Sentinel Range. Scale 1:50 000 topographic map. Omega Foundation, 2007.
- Antarctic Digital Database (ADD). Scale 1:250000 topographic map of Antarctica. Scientific Committee on Antarctic Research (SCAR). Since 1993, regularly updated
