= Mount Epperly =

Mountain in Ellsworth Land, Antarctica

- Location of Vinson Massif in Western Antarctica.

Highest point
- Elevation: 4,359 m (14,301 ft)
- Coordinates: 78°27′0″S 85°51′0″W

Geography
- Central and southern Sentinel Range map
- Location: Antarctica

Climbing
- First ascent: December 1, 1994 by Erhard Loretan

Mount Epperly is a 4,359-metre-high (14,301 ft) or perhaps 4,512-metre-high (14,803 ft) mountain in the Sentinel Range, Ellsworth Mountains in Antarctica. It overlooks Cervellati Glacier to the northeast and Ramorino Glacier to the east-northeast. The peak was first climbed by Erhard Loretan, solo over the 2,100-metre-high (6,900 ft) south face, on December 1, 1994. Loretan returned the next year and reclimbed the route for a film. In 1999, the American climbers Conrad Anker and Jim Donini failed in their attempt over the west ridge. The third successful ascent was by the Chilean Camilo Rada and Australian Damien Gildea via a new route over the south face in December 2007. Their GPS measurements on top suggested a height 153 m above the official one. This mountain is named after Robert Epperly (born 1926) who spent time during the International Geophysical Year of 1957–1958 in Antarctica. Epperly served in the US Navy at that time. He lived his latter years in Worthington, Massachusetts, and is interred there.

== See also ==
- Mountains in Antarctica

== Maps ==
- Vinson Massif. Scale 1:250 000 topographic map. Reston, Virginia: US Geological Survey, 1988.
- Antarctic Digital Database (ADD). Scale 1:250000 topographic map of Antarctica. Scientific Committee on Antarctic Research (SCAR). Since 1993, regularly updated.
