= Holth Peaks =

Topographic feature in Antarctica

Location of Sentinel Range in Western Antarctica.

Northern Sentinel Range map.

The Holth Peaks (77°25′S 86°43′W) are a group of peaks which rise to 1,820 metres (5,970 ft) in the form of a short northeast–southwest ridge, 2 nautical miles (4 km) northwest of Mount Lymburner near the northern end of the Sentinel Range in the Ellsworth Mountains of Antarctica. They were discovered by Lincoln Ellsworth on his trans-Antarctic flight of November 23, 1935, and were named by the Advisory Committee on Antarctic Names for Baard Holth, captain of the MV Wyatt Earp on Ellsworth's first expedition to Antarctica in 1933–34.

== See also ==
- Mountains in Antarctica
