= Mount Alf =

Mountain in Ellsworth Land, Antarctica

Location of Sentinel Range in Western Antarctica.

Northern Sentinel Range map.

Mount Alf (77°56′S 86°08′W) is a mountain rising over 3,200 m between Mount Sharp and Mount Dalrymple in the north part of the Sentinel Range, Antarctica. It surmounts Sabazios Glacier to the northeast. It was named after Edward A. Alf, the nephew of Raymond M. Alf Museum of Paleontology. He worked at the U.S. Weather Bureau Airport Station, in Great Falls, Montana in 1961. Joseph Kaplan, chairman of the National Academy of sciences—National Research Council of the United States of America sent a letter confirming this honor. The Antarctic feature, a mountain peak in West Antarctica, has been named in recognition of his contributions while a participant in the United States scientific program in Antarctica during the International Geophysical Year. The proposal to name this feature in his behalf was made by Mr. George R. Toney and Dr. Charles Bentley who mapped this area in January 1958, and was approved by the National Academy of Sciences' Special Committee on IGY Geographic Names in the Antarctic and the U. S. Board on Geographic Names, Department of Interior.

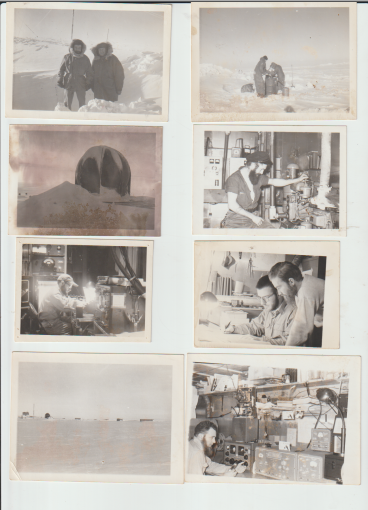
Edward Alf in Antarctica

The mountain was mapped by the Charles R. Bentley-led Marie Byrd Land Traverse party, 1957–58. Named by the Advisory Committee on Antarctic Names (US-ACAN) for Edward A. Alf, meteorologist, member of the 1957 wintering party at Byrd Station.

== See also ==
- Mountains in Antarctica
