= Mount Morris (Antarctica) =

Mountain in Ellsworth Land, Antarctica

Coordinates: 78°19′S 86°10′W

Location of Sentinel Range in Western Antarctica.

Central and southern Sentinel Range map.

Mount Morris is a steep, sharp mountain about 1 nautical mile (2 km) south of Mount Ostenso, in the main ridge of the Sentinel Range of the Ellsworth Mountains in Antarctica. It surmounts Patton Glacier to the eas-northeast.

The peak was first mapped by the United States Geological Survey from surveys and U.S. Navy air photos from 1957 to 1959, and was named by the Advisory Committee on Antarctic Names for Wesley R. Morris, a meteorologist at Byrd Station in 1957.

== See also ==
- Mountains in Antarctica

== Maps ==
- Vinson Massif. Scale 1:250 000 topographic map. Reston, Virginia: US Geological Survey, 1988.
- Antarctic Digital Database (ADD). Scale 1:250000 topographic map of Antarctica. Scientific Committee on Antarctic Research (SCAR). Since 1993, regularly updated.
