= Arzos Peak =

Antarctic rock peak

Location of Sentinel Range in Western Antarctica.

Map of northern Sentinel Range.

Arzos Peak (Bulgarian: Връх Арзос, romanized: vrah Arzos, IPA: [ˈvrɤx ˈarzos]) is the sharp rocky peak on the west side of northern Sentinel Range in Ellsworth Mountains, Antarctica rising to 1893 m on the side ridge extending from a peak standing on the main crest of the range just north-northwest of Mount Dawson. Arzos is the ancient Thracian name of Sazliyka River in Southern Bulgaria.

== Location ==
Arzos Peak is located at 77°48′37″S 86°42′50″W, which is 10.4 km southwest of Mount Crawford, 10.22 km west of Mount Dawson, 15 km northwest of Mursalitsa Peak and 18.65 km southeast of Fisher Nunatak. US mapping in 1961.

== See also ==
- Mountains in Antarctica

== Maps ==
- Newcomer Glacier. Scale 1:250 000 topographic map. Reston, Virginia: US Geological Survey, 1961.
- Antarctic Digital Database (ADD). Scale 1:250000 topographic map of Antarctica. Scientific Committee on Antarctic Research (SCAR). Since 1993, regularly updated.
