= Ravulya Nunatak =

Location of Sentinel Range in Western Antarctica.

Map of northern Sentinel Range.

Ravulya Nunatak (Bulgarian: нунатак Равуля, ‘Nunatak Ravulya’ \'nu-na-tak ra-'vu-lya\) is the rocky hill of elevation 1163 m projecting from the ice cap in the northern periphery of Sentinel Range in Ellsworth Mountains, Antarctica. It is named after Ravulya Peak and Golyama (Big) Ravulya Peak in Lozen Mountain, Bulgaria.

== Location ==
Ravulya Nunatak is located at 77°13′32.2″S 86°21′25″W, which is 13.88 km north of Mount Holmboe and 11 km northwest of Lanz Peak. US mapping in 1961.

== Maps ==
- Newcomer Glacier. Scale 1:250 000 topographic map. Reston, Virginia: US Geological Survey, 1961.
- Antarctic Digital Database (ADD). Scale 1:250000 topographic map of Antarctica. Scientific Committee on Antarctic Research (SCAR). Since 1993, regularly updated.
