= Olsen Peak =

Mountain in Ellsworth Land, Antarctica

Location of Sentinel Range in Western Antarctica.

Northern Sentinel Range map.

Olsen Peak (77°32′S 86°29′W) is a peak, 2,140 m, standing 2 nautical miles (3.7 km) northwest of Mount Wyatt Earp near the north end of the Sentinel Range in Antarctica. It was discovered by Lincoln Ellsworth on his trans-Antarctic flight of November 23, 1935. It was named by the Advisory Committee on Antarctic Names (US-ACAN) for Hartveg Olsen, the captain of Ellsworth's expedition ship Wyatt Earp in 1935–36.

== See also ==
- Mountains in Antarctica
