= Veikka Gustafsson =

Finnish mountain climber, summiter of all eight-thousanders

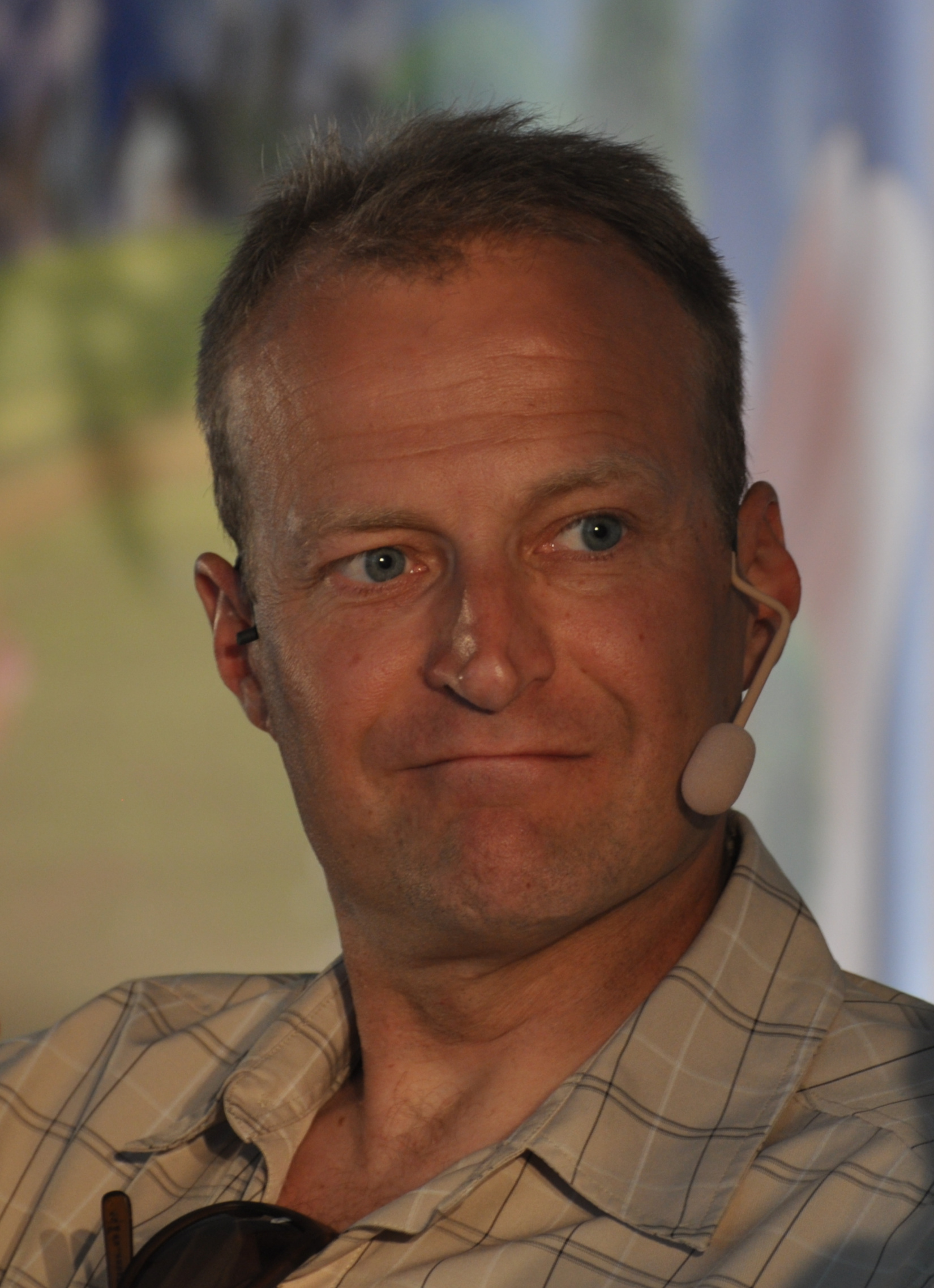
- Veikka Gustafsson at SuomiAreena in Pori, 2014
- Born: Eero Veikka Juhani Gustafsson; 14 January 1968 (age 58); Espoo, Finland
- Occupation: Mountaineer
- Known for: Summited all 14 eight-thousanders without supplemental oxygen

Eero Veikka Juhani Gustafsson, known as Veikka Gustafsson (born 14 January 1968) is a Finnish climber who has ascended all 14 eight-thousanders without using supplemental oxygen. He is also known for presenting a TV travel show on Finnish television.

== Climbing career ==
In 1993, Gustafsson became the first Finnish person to reach the summit of Mount Everest. In the spring of 1997, he also became the first Finn to have reached the summit without using bottled oxygen. Gustafsson is the 17th person to have summited all 14 of the highest peaks above 8,000 metres, and the 9th to do so without using supplemental oxygen. Research published in 2022 estimated that Gustafsson is one of only three climbers to have stood on the "true" geographical summit of all the eight-thousanders, and he was the second to do so after American climber, Ed Viesturs. Gustafsson and Viesturs climbed six of the 8000ers together and they were climbing Annapurna together when Viesturs ascended his final 8000er in 2005.

== Eight-thousander ascents ==
- Mount Everest (8848 m), spring 1993, with bottled oxygen
- Dhaulagiri (8167 m), fall 1993
- K2 (8611 m), summer 1994
- Lhotse (8516 m), spring 1995
- Makalu (8483 m), spring 1995
- Mount Everest (8848 m), spring 1997, without bottled oxygen
- Manaslu (8163 m), spring 1999
- Dhaulagiri (8167 m), spring 1999
- Shishapangma (8013 m), spring 2001
- Nanga Parbat (8125 m), summer 2001
- Mount Everest (8848 m), spring 2004
- Cho Oyu (8201 m), 22 April 2005
- Annapurna (8091 m), 12 May 2005
- Kanchenjunga (8586 m), 14 May 2006
- Gasherbrum II (8035 m), 8 July 2008
- Broad Peak (8051 m), 31 July 2008
- Gasherbrum I (8080 m), 26 July 2009

== Other notable ascents/attempts ==
In the Alps:

- Frendo ridge
- Bonatti pillar
- Les Courtes, north wall (Swiss route)

In the Pamir:

- Pik Kommunisma (7495 m) and Pik Korsenevskaja (7105 m), summer 1993
- Pik Kommunisma (7495 m). Basecamp to basecamp in 36 h.

In the Himalayas:

- Mount Everest (8848 m), spring 1996. Reached 7500 m.
- Broad Peak (8 047 m), 1997. Reached ridge between Main summit and Rocky summit.
- Annapurna (8091 m), spring 2000. Failed to summit.
- Annapurna (8091 m), spring 2002. Reached 7300 m.
- Kangchenjunga (8 586 m), spring 2003. Reached 7100 m.

Elsewhere:

- Mount Vinson (4892 m), winter 1996. The highest mountain in Antarctica.
- Four first ascents on the Antarctica, winter 1997. Summited Mount Gardner (4587 m) and an unnamed peak, later unofficially named Mount Sisu (4300 m).

== Personal life ==
Veikka Gustafsson leases the Porkkala Lighthouse and arranges trips there.

== See also ==
- List of Mount Everest summiters by number of times to the summit

== Notes ==
In 2008 mid-July Veikka Gustafsson and Fernando Gonzalez-Rubio attempted Gasherbrum I (8068m), but the two were forced to abort the summit bid just before 100m due to bad weather (snowstorm, total whiteout). On 26 July 2009 he prevailed in a second attempt, along with Japanese climber Kazuya Hiraide and Bulgarian climbers Nilolay Petkov, Doychin Boyanov, Boyan Petrov and Nikolay Valkov.
