= Mount Holmboe =

Antarctic mountain

Location of Sentinel Range in Western Antarctica.

Northern Sentinel Range map.

Mount Holmboe (77°20′S 86°35′W) is a mountain, 1,730 metres (5,680 ft) high, standing 1 nautical mile (2 km) north of Mount Liavaag and 7 nautical miles (13 km) northwest of Mount Weems near the extreme north end of the Sentinel Range in the Ellsworth Mountains of Antarctica.

It was discovered by Lincoln Ellsworth on his trans-Antarctic flight of November 23, 1935, and was named by the Advisory Committee on Antarctic Names for Dr. Jørgen Holmboe, a meteorologist on Ellsworth's Antarctic expedition of 1933–34.

== See also ==
- Mountains in Antarctica
