= Mount Sisu =

Mountain in Ellsworth Land, Antarctica

Coordinates: 78°07′52″S 86°14′20″W

Location of Sentinel Range in Western Antarctica.

Sentinel Range map.

Mount Sisu is a mountain in the Antarctic. Finnish mountaineers Veikka Gustafsson and Patrick Degerman were the first people to ascend it, in 1997. It was named after the Finnish concept of sisu, meaning a sense of steadfast, rugged perseverance. The name has not been officially sanctioned by the United States Geological Survey, as it is not found on their Geographic Names Information System, nor does it meet the organization's standards for geological nomenclature on the Antarctic continent.

Mount Sisu, reaching a height of 4300 meters over sea level, is located in the Sentinel Range of the Ellsworth Mountains, also the site of the highest peak in the Antarctic, the Vinson Massif. The nearest other peaks to Mount Sisu are Mount Anderson and Mount Bentley.

== Maps ==
- Vinson Massif. Scale 1:250 000 topographic map. Reston, Virginia: US Geological Survey, 1988.
- Antarctic Digital Database (ADD). Scale 1:250000 topographic map of Antarctica. Scientific Committee on Antarctic Research (SCAR). Since 1993, regularly updated.
