= Cervellati Glacier =

Glacier in Antarctica

- Location of Vinson Massif in Western Antarctica

- Location within Antarctica
- Location: Ellsworth Land
- Coordinates: 78°23′S 85°43′W
- Length: 5 nmi (9 km; 6 mi)
- Thickness: unknown
- Terminus: Crosswell Glacier
- Status: unknown

Central and southern Sentinel Range map.

Cervellati Glacier (78°23′S 85°43′W) is a 5 nmi (9 km; 6 mi) long glacier situated on the southeast of Patton Glacier and northwest of Ramorino Glacier on the east slope of Sentinel Range in the Ellsworth Mountains, Antarctica. It flows northeastwards between Tyree Ridge and Epperly Ridge, and enters Crosswell Glacier southeast of Mount Bearskin. The feature was named by US-ACAN in 2006 after Roberto Cervellati (1933-2026), Italian representative to the SCAR Expert Group on Geographic Information, 1992–2006, and director of the SCAR Composite Gazetteer of Antarctica in the same period.

== See also ==
- List of glaciers in the Antarctic
- Glaciology

== Maps ==
- Vinson Massif. Scale 1:250 000 topographic map. Reston, Virginia: US Geological Survey, 1988.
- Antarctic Digital Database (ADD). Scale 1:250000 topographic map of Antarctica. Scientific Committee on Antarctic Research (SCAR). Since 1993, regularly updated.
