= Damien Gildea =

Australian mountain climber and explorer

Damien Gildea (born 1969) is an Australian mountaineer and Antarctic explorer who has climbed extensively in Antarctica, Nepal, Tibet, Pakistan, Bolivia, Alaska, New Zealand and elsewhere.

== Mountaineering ==
His Antarctic ascents include Mount Vinson, Mount Shinn, Mount Craddock, Mount Gardner, Mount Bentley, Mount Anderson (first ascent), Mount Ryan, and several other peaks in the Vinson Massif, Craddock Massif and northern Sentinel Range between 2001 and 2007, as well as Mount Friesland and Mount Bowles on Livingston Island in 2003. The high-precision GPS data collected by his team was used in subsequent American and Bulgarian mapping.

== Antarctic Expeditions ==
In 2012 Gildea led a team following in the footsteps of Robert Falcon Scott, in order to raise money for charity. Gildea has collected data during his Antarctic expeditions for scientific analysis.

== Publishing ==
Gildea is the author of The Antarctic Mountaineering Chronology.

In 2007 Gildea published the new 1:50,000 colour topographical map Vinson Massif & The Sentinel Range, including a number of new features named by the USGS.

In November 2010 published Gildea's new book Mountaineering in Antarctica: Climbing in the Frozen South.

== Honour ==
Gildea Glacier in Craddock Massif, Antarctica is named after him.

== Publications ==
- Mountaineering in Antarctica: Climbing in the Frozen South. 192 pages, 200 images, new maps, lists.
- Antarctic Mountaineering Chronology. New Zealand Mountain Safety Council, 1998. 110 pp. ISBN 978-0-646-36129-1
- Information on Ice: Seven years of first ascents and data collection in Antarctica. American Alpine Journal, 2007. pp. 98–105.
- Antarctic Peninsula: Livingston Island, South Shetland Islands, second ascent of Mt. Friesland and New Altitude. American Alpine Journal, 2004. pp. 329–331.
