= Mount Gardner =

Mountain in Ellsworth Land, Antarctica

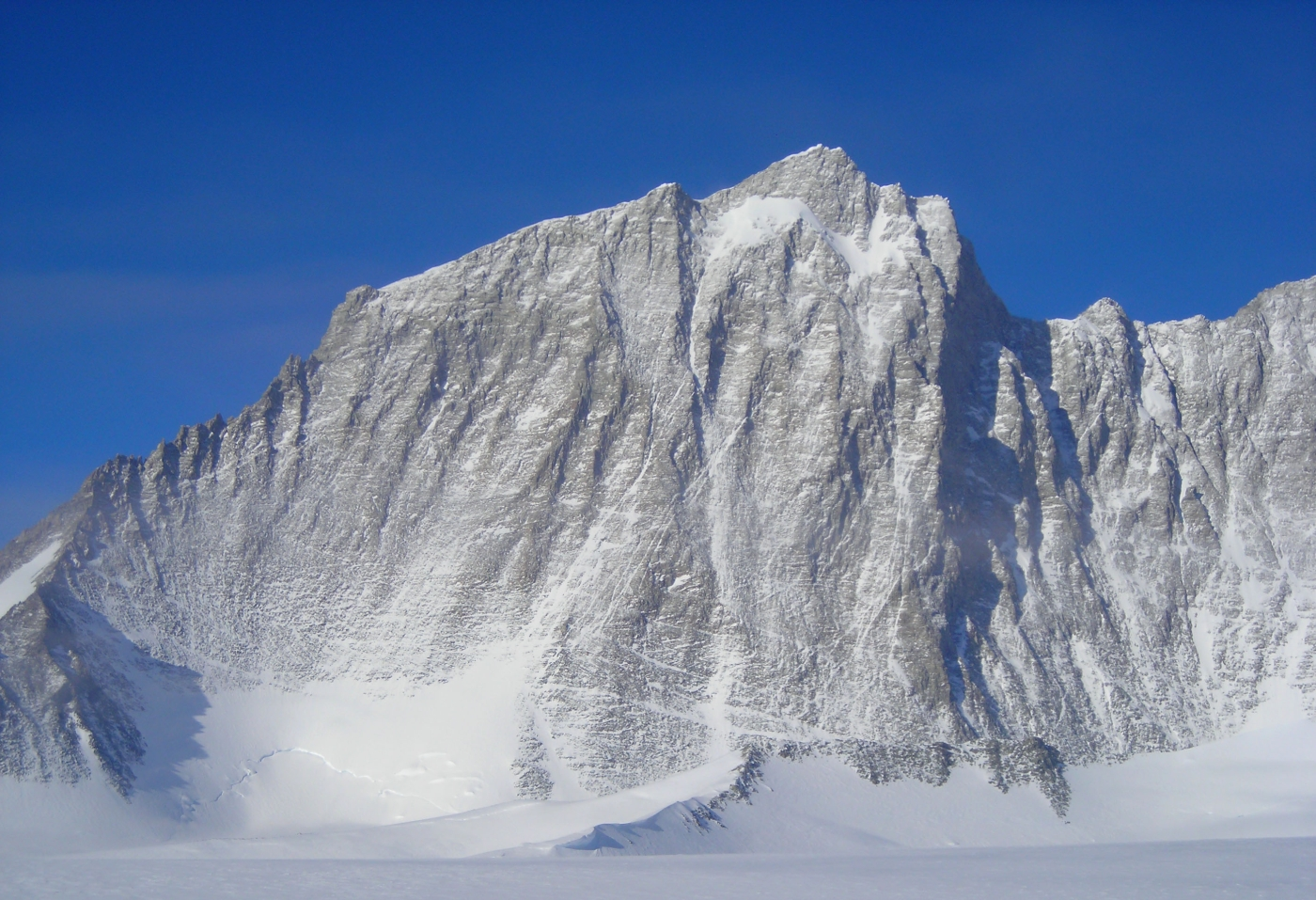
Mount Gardner from southwest (Photo: Christian Stangl, 2008)

Location of Sentinel Range in Western Antarctica.

Central and southern Sentinel Range map.

Mount Gardner (78°23′S 86°2′W) is a mountain, 4,587 metres (15,050 ft) high, standing 1.5 nautical miles (3 km) west of Mount Tyree in the west-central part of the Sentinel Range, in the Ellsworth Mountains of Antarctica. It surmounts Patton Glacier to the northeast.

The peak was discovered by the Marie Byrd Land Traverse party of 1957–58 under Charles R. Bentley and was named by the Advisory Committee on Antarctic Names for Lieutenant Harvey E. Gardner, U.S. Navy, a pilot in Antarctica in the 1957–58 and 1958–59 seasons who was killed in the crash of a UB-1 Otter airplane at Marble Point on January 4, 1959.

== See also ==
- Mountains in Antarctica

== Maps ==
- Vinson Massif. Scale 1:250 000 topographic map. Reston, Virginia: US Geological Survey, 1988.
- Antarctic Digital Database (ADD). Scale 1:250000 topographic map of Antarctica. Scientific Committee on Antarctic Research (SCAR). Since 1993, regularly upgraded and updated.
