= Liavaag =

Liavaag may refer to:

- Ove Liavaag (1938–2007), Norwegian civil servant
- Mount Liavaag, mountain in Ellsworth Land, Antarctica
