= Probuda Ridge =

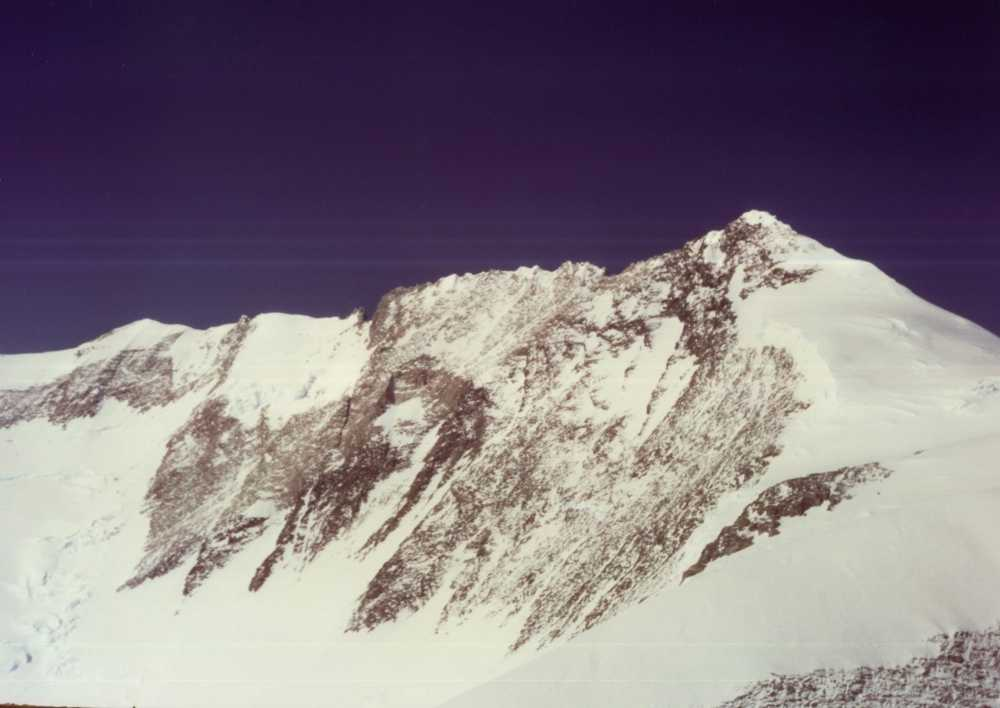
Mount Press, the summit of Probuda Ridge

Location of Sentinel Range in West Antarctica

USGS map of Sentinel Range

Probuda Ridge (Bulgarian: хребет Пробуда, ‘Hrebet Probuda’ \'hre-bet pro-'bu-da\) is the 15 kilometres (9.3 mi) long and 4.5 kilometres (2.8 mi) wide side ridge descending from Mount Anderson north-northeastwards towards Mount Todd in north-central Sentinel Range, Ellsworth Mountains in Antarctica. The ridge features Eyer Peak (3,368 metres (11,050 ft)), Mount Press (3,732 metres (12,244 ft)) and Mount Todd (3,591 metres (11,781 ft)), and surmounts Embree Glacier to the west and north, Patleyna Glacier to the northeast, and Ellen Glacier and its tributary Fonfon Glacier to the southeast. Linked to Bangey Heights to the northeast by Chepino Saddle. The ridge's summit Mount Press was first ascended by the American Jed Brown and the Chileans Camilo Rada and Maria Paz 'Pachi' Ibarra on 31 December 2006.

The ridge is named after the settlement of Probuda in Northeastern Bulgaria.

== Location ==
Probuda Ridge is centred at 78°07′30″S 85°56′00″W. US mapping in 1961, updated in 1988.

== Maps ==
- Vinson Massif. Scale 1:250 000 topographic map. Reston, Virginia: US Geological Survey, 1988.
- Antarctic Digital Database (ADD). Scale 1:250000 topographic map of Antarctica. Scientific Committee on Antarctic Research (SCAR). Since 1993, regularly updated.
