= Shockey Peak =

Mountain peak in Antarctica

- Northern Sentinel Range map.

Highest point
- Elevation: 2,010 metres (6,590 ft)
- Coordinates: 77°36′S 86°47′W

Geography
- Location within Antarctica
- Location: Antarctica
- Parent range: Sentinel Range

Shockey Peak is a 2,010 m tall peak, rising 2 miles (3.2 km) southeast of Allen Peak near the north extremity of the main ridge of the Sentinel Range, Antarctica. It was discovered by Lincoln Ellsworth on his trans-Antarctic flight of November 23, 1935. It was named by the Advisory Committee on Antarctic Names (US-ACAN) for Charles C. Shockey of the Branch of Special Maps, U.S. Geological Survey, which prepared the 1962 map of this range.
