= Howard Nunataks =

Location of Sentinel Range in Western Antarctica.

Northern Sentinel Range map.

The Howard Nunataks (77°30′S 87°0′W) are a group of some 15 nunataks lying off the extremity of the mountainous ridge at the northwest corner of the Sentinel Range, Antarctica. They were discovered by Lincoln Ellsworth on his trans-Antarctic flight of November 23, 1935, and were named by the Advisory Committee on Antarctic Names for Patrick Howard, an engine mechanic on Ellsworth's expedition.
