= Schatz Ridge =

Schatz Ridge (78°29′00″S 86°03′00″W) is a ridge, 1 nautical mile (1.9 km) long, located 1 nautical mile (1.9 km) northwest of Knutzen Peak on the Taylor Ledge, in the Sentinel Range of the Ellsworth Mountains. An outlier, the ridge has the appearance of a nunatak with two peaks, the higher eastern one rising 200 metres (660 ft) above the ice surface. It was named by the Advisory Committee on Antarctic Names in 2006 after Gerald S. Schatz, a research analyst and editor of the National Academy of Sciences News Report, who authored a number of papers on Antarctic environment, conservation and legal issues in the 1970s and 1980s. He provided environmental policy advice to the US Antarctic Program while on a temporary appointment to ITT Antarctic Services Inc.
