= Pastrogor =

- Village
- Location within Bulgaria
- Coordinates: 41°51′N 26°12′E
- Country: Bulgaria
- Province: Haskovo Province
- Municipality: Svilengrad
- Time zone: UTC+2 (EET)
  - Summer (DST): UTC+3 (EEST)

Pastrogor (or Patrogor) is a village in the municipality of Svilengrad, Haskovo Province, southern Bulgaria. Next to the village an immigarion center is located.

Pastrogor Peak in Antarctica is named after the village.
