= Gildea Glacier =

Glacier in Antarctica

- Location of Sentinel Range in Western Antarctica

- Location within Antarctica
- Type: tributary
- Location: Ellsworth Land
- Coordinates: 78°38′00″S 85°39′00″W
- Length: 5 nautical miles (9.3 km; 5.8 mi)
- Width: 2.7 nautical miles (5.0 km; 3.1 mi)
- Thickness: unknown
- Terminus: Nimitz Glacier
- Status: unknown

Sentinel Range map

Gildea Glacier is a glacier 10 kilometres (6 mi) long and 5 kilometres (3 mi) wide flowing southwestward from Craddock Massif between Mount Slaughter and Mount Atkinson into Nimitz Glacier, in the Sentinel Range of the Ellsworth Mountains, Antarctica. The upper portion of the glacier also receives ice from Hammer Col and southern Vinson Massif.

It was named by the Advisory Committee on Antarctic Names in 2006 after Damien Gildea, the Australian leader of several Omega Foundation expeditions to the Sentinel Range and Livingston Island in 2000–07. He made an ascent of Mount Craddock from the Bender Glacier in 2005, and directed the preparation of a 1:50,000-scale map of the Vinson Massif area for publication by the Omega Foundation in 2006.

== See also ==
- List of glaciers in the Antarctic
- Glaciology

== Maps ==
- Vinson Massif. Scale 1:250 000 topographic map. Reston, Virginia: US Geological Survey, 1988.
- D. Gildea and C. Rada. Vinson Massif and the Sentinel Range. Scale 1:50 000 topographic map. Omega Foundation, 2007.
- Antarctic Digital Database (ADD). Scale 1:250000 topographic map of Antarctica. Scientific Committee on Antarctic Research (SCAR). Since 1993, regularly updated.
