= Shinn Ridge =

Location of Vinson Massif in Western Antarctica.

Central and southern Sentinel Range map.

Shinn Ridge (78°26′00″S 85°34′00″W) is a rock ridge that extends northeast for 4 nautical miles (7.4 km) from Mount Shinn in the Sentinel Range of the Ellsworth Mountains. It was named by the Advisory Committee on Antarctic Names in 2006 in association with Mount Shinn.

== Maps ==
- Vinson Massif. Scale 1:250 000 topographic map. Reston, Virginia: US Geological Survey, 1988.
- D. Gildea and C. Rada. Vinson Massif and the Sentinel Range. Scale 1:50 000 topographic map. Omega Foundation, 2007.
- Antarctic Digital Database (ADD). Scale 1:250000 topographic map of Antarctica. Scientific Committee on Antarctic Research (SCAR). Since 1993, regularly updated.
