= Jacobsen Valley =

Valley in Antarctica

Location of Sentinel Range in Western Antarctica.

Vinson Massif map.

Jacobsen Valley (Bulgarian: долина Якобсен, ‘Dolina Jacobsen’ /doliˈna ˈjakopsen/) is the shallow valley in Vinson Massif, Sentinel Range in Ellsworth Mountains, descending northwards from the summit of Antarctica Mount Vinson (4892 m). It is 3.5 km long and 1.2 km wide, and is bounded to the west by Branscomb Peak and Galicia Peak, and to the east by a minor ridge running between the east side of Mount Vinson to the south and Goodge Col to the north. Draining the valley is a glacier tributary to Branscomb Glacier, part of the classical route to the summit of Mount Vinson.

The valley is named after the Norwegian woman pioneer of Antarctica Solveig Gunbjørg Jacobsen (1913–1996), the first native child of the Antarctic region born in Grytviken on 8 October 1913.

== Location ==
Jacobsen Valley is centred at 78°30′30″S 85°39′00″W. US mapping in 1961, 1988 and 2007.

== Maps ==
- Vinson Massif. Scale 1:250 000 topographic map. Reston, Virginia: US Geological Survey, 1988.
- D. Gildea and C. Rada. Vinson Massif and the Sentinel Range. Scale 1:50 000 topographic map. Omega Foundation, 2007.
- Antarctic Digital Database (ADD). Scale 1:250000 topographic map of Antarctica. Scientific Committee on Antarctic Research (SCAR). Since 1993, regularly updated.
