= Mount Bearskin =

Mountain in the Antarctic

Location of Sentinel Range in Western Antarctica.

Sentinel Range map.

Mount Bearskin (78°20′S 85°37′W) is a mountain (2,850 m) located 5 nautical miles (9 km) northeast of Mount Tyree, between Patton and Crosswell Glaciers, in the Sentinel Range, Ellsworth Mountains. It is linked to Tyree Ridge by Podgore Saddle.

The mountain was mapped by the United States Geological Survey (USGS) from surveys and U.S. Navy air photos, 1957–1959. It was named by the Advisory Committee on Antarctic Names (US-ACAN) for Captain Leland S. Bearskin of the United States Air Force (USAF), who participated in establishing the IGY South Pole Station in the 1956–57 season.

== See also ==
- Mountains in Antarctica

== Maps ==
- Vinson Massif. Scale 1:250000 topographic map. Reston, Virginia: US Geological Survey, 1988.
- Antarctic Digital Database (ADD). Scale 1:250000 topographic map of Antarctica. Scientific Committee on Antarctic Research (SCAR). Since 1993, regularly updated.
