= Sentinel Range =

Mountain range in Antarctica

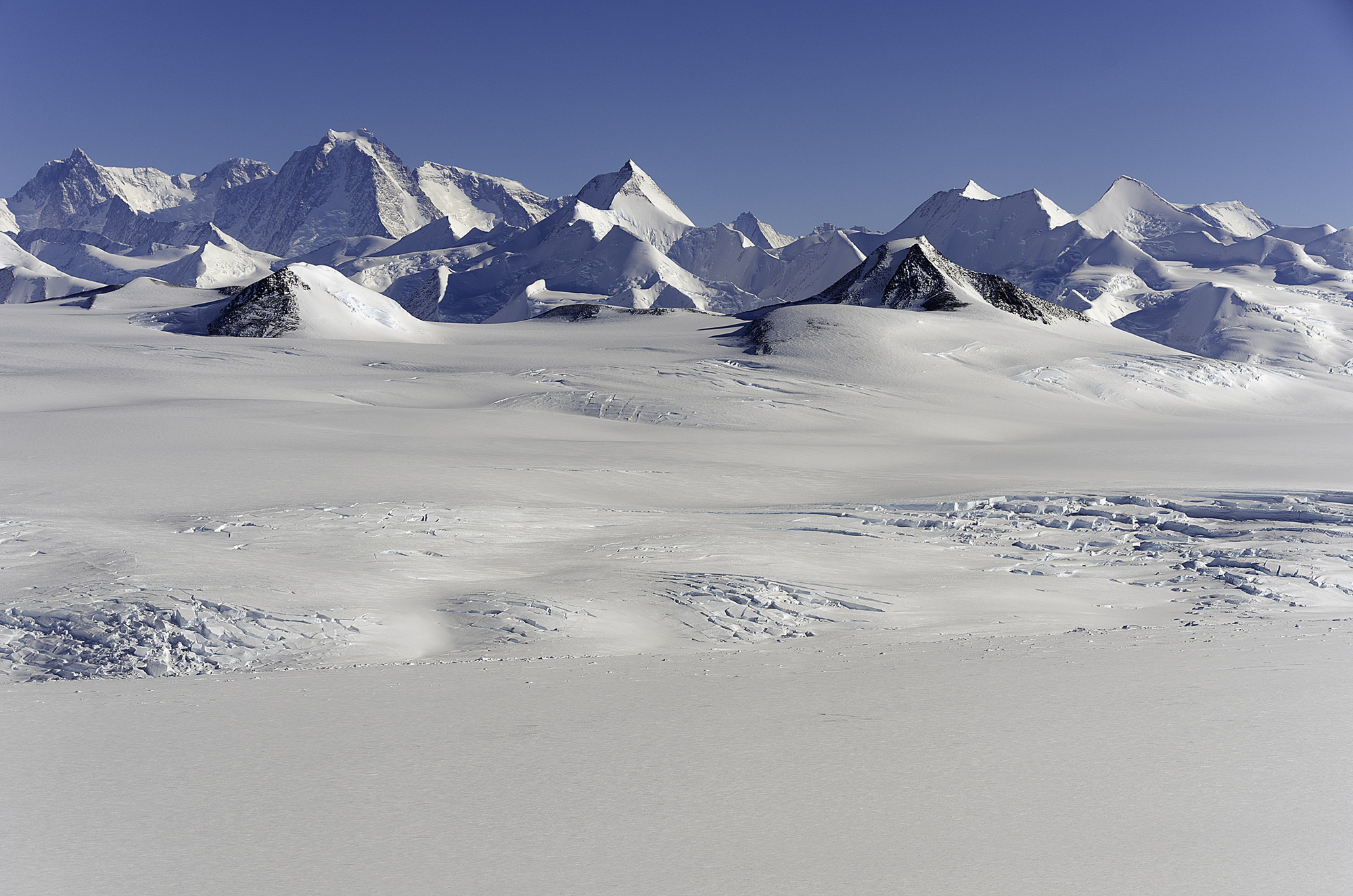
- Sentinel Range

Highest point
- Peak: Mount Vinson
- Elevation: 4,892 m (16,050 ft)
- Coordinates: 78°31′31.74″S 85°37′01.73″W

Dimensions
- Length: 185 km (115 mi) NNW-SSE
- Width: 48 km (30 mi)

Geography
- Location of Sentinel Range in Western Antarctica
- Continent: Antarctica
- Region: Ellsworth Land
- Range coordinates: 78°10′S 85°30′W
- Parent range: Ellsworth Mountains
- Borders on: Heritage Range

The Sentinel Range is a major mountain range situated northward of Minnesota Glacier and forming the northern half of the Ellsworth Mountains in Antarctica. The range trends NNW-SSE for about 185 km (115 mi) and is 24 to 48 km (15 to 30 mi) wide. Many peaks rise over 4,000 m (13,100 ft) and Vinson Massif (4892 m) in the southern part of the range is the highest elevation on the continent.

Sentinel Range comprises a main ridge (featuring Vinson Massif in its southern portion) and a number of distinct heights, ridges and mountains on its east side, including (south to north) Owen Ridge, Petvar Heights, Doyran Heights, Veregava Ridge, Flowers Hills, Sullivan Heights, Barnes Ridge, Maglenik Heights, Probuda Ridge, Bangey Heights, Sostra Heights and Gromshin Heights. It is separated from Bastien Range to the southwest by Nimitz Glacier, and from Heritage Range to the south by lower Minnesota Glacier.

The range was first sighted and photographed from the air on November 23, 1935, by Lincoln Ellsworth who in naming it recognized its prominent position as a landmark on an otherwise featureless ice surface. The range was first visited and partially surveyed in January 1958 during the Sentinel Mountains Traverse led by Charles R. Bentley. The entire range was subsequently mapped by USGS from aerial photography taken by the U.S. Navy, 1958–61.

Northern Sentinel Range, USGS map

Central and southern Sentinel Range, USGS map

== Key mountains and peaks ==
Mountain	Metres	Feet	Coordinates
Mount Vinson	4,892	16,050	78°31′31.74″S 85°37′1.73″W
Mount Tyree	4,852	15,919	78°24′42″S 85°51′43″W
Clinch Peak	4,841	15,883	78°32′08″S 85°30′45″W
Corbet Peak	4,822	15,820	78°31′31″S 85°32′50″W
Schoening Peak	4,743	15,561	78°31′36″S 85°27′57″W
Hollister Peak	4,729	15,515	78°32′43″S 85°35′19″W
Príncipe de Asturias Peak	4,680	15,350	78°32′50″S 85°42′32″W
Mount Shinn	4,660	15,290	78°27′S 85°46′W
Fukushima Peak	4,634	15,203	78°33′31″S 85°34′16″W
Marts Peak	4,551	14,931	78°32′18″S 85°24′07″W
Branscomb Peak	4,520	14,830	78°30′57″S 85°41′44″W
Opalchenie Peak	4,503.5	14,775	78°34′02″S 85°34′53″W
Mount Rutford	4,477	14,688	78°36′S 85°18′W
Mount Craddock	4,368	14,331	78°38′S 85°12′W
Mount Anderson	4,254	13,957	78°09′S 86°13′W
Mount Bentley	4,245	13,927	78°07′S 86°14′W
Mount Ostenso	4,180	13,710	78°18′S 86°11′W
Peak 4111	4,160	13,650	78°13′S 86°08′W
Mount Giovinetto	4,090	13,420	78°16′S 86°10′W
Evans Peak	3,950	12,960	78°17′S 85°58′W
Mount Goldthwait	3,815	12,516	77°59′S 86°03′W
Mount Davis	3,800	12,500	78°06′S 86°15′W
Mount Press	3,760	12,340	78°09′18″S 85°59′45″W
Mount Viets	3,600	11,800	78°15′S 86°06′W
Mount Todd	3,600	11,800	78°05′39″S 85°52′39″W
Mount Dalrymple	3,600	11,800	77°56′S 86°03′W
Mount Hale	3,595	11,795	78°04′S 86°19′W
Mount Tuck	3,560	11,680	78°29′S 84°50′W
Mount Slaughter	3,444	11,299	78°37′S 85°38′W
Knutzen Peak	3,373	11,066	78°29′47″S 85°56′35″W
Eyer Peak	3,368	11,050	78°09′S 86°00′W
Mount Atkinson	3,300	10,800	78°39′S 85°29′W
Mount Allen	3,248	10,656	78°41′46″S 85°01′10″W
Mount Alf	3,200	10,500	77°55′S 86°07′W
Mount Waldron	3,100	10,200	78°27′S 84°53′W
Mount Milton	3,000	9,800	78°48′S 84°48′W
Vanand Peak	3,000	9,800	78°29′S 85°18′W

== Maps ==
- Vinson Massif. Scale 1:250 000 topographic map. Reston, Virginia: US Geological Survey, 1988.
- Newcomer Glacier. Scale 1:250 000 topographic map. Reston, Virginia: US Geological Survey, 1961.
- Antarctic Digital Database (ADD). Scale 1:250000 topographic map of Antarctica. Scientific Committee on Antarctic Research (SCAR). Since 1993, regularly updated.

== Features ==
Geographical features include:

=== Bangey Heights ===
78°02′30″S 85°34′00″W

- Bezden Peak
- Chepino Saddle
- Embree Glacier
- Fucha Peak
- Golemani Peak
- Kopsis Glacier
- Marsa Glacier
- Mount Hleven
- Mount Schmid
- Oreshak Peak
- Padala Glacier
- Panicheri Gap
- Patleyna Glacier
- Probuda Ridge

=== Bastien Range ===
78°50′S 086°00′W

- Ereta Peak
- Mount Klayn
- Mount Fisek
- Wild Knoll
- Patmos Peak
- Bergison Peak
- O'Neal Nunataks
- Camp Hills

=== Doyran Heights ===
78°32′30″S 84°37′00″W

- Beloslav Peak
- Goreme Col
- Guerrero Glacier
- Hansen Glacier
- Hough Glacier
- Johnson Spur
- Kostinbrod Pass
- Manole Pass
- McPherson Peak
- Midzhur Peak
- Mount Benson
- Mount Havener
- Mount Mohl
- Mount Tuck
- Prosenik Peak
- Remington Glacier
- Sikera Valley
- Taylor Spur

=== Flowers Hills ===
78°24′S 84°10′W

- Batil Spur
- Dater Glacier
- Dickey Peak
- Gubesh Peak
- Hansen Glacier
- Kostinbrod Pass
- Lardeya Ice Piedmont
- Monyak Hill
- Rutford Ice Stream
- Sikera Valley
- Strinava Glacier
- Taylor Spur
- Valoga Glacier

=== Gromshin Heights ===
77°38′00″S 85°46′00″W

- Branishte Peak
- Foros Spur
- Kipra Gap
- Matsch Ridge
- Miller Bluffs
- Mount Cornwell
- Mount Mogensen
- Mount Ojakangas
- Mount Ulmer
- Mount Warren
- Mount Weems
- Newcomer Glacier
- Polarstar Peak
- Skamni Saddle
- Vicha Glacier
- Vidul Glacier
- Yamen Glacier

=== Maglenik Heights ===
78°10′00″S 85°14′00″W

- Arapya Glacier
- Barnes Ridge
- Chapman Peak
- Dropla Gap
- Ellen Glacier
- Embree Glacier
- Ichera Peak
- Kopsis Glacier
- Mirovyane Peak
- Mount Gozur
- Panicheri Gap
- Roberts Peak
- Voysil Peak
- Young Glacier
- Zimornitsa Peak
- Rutford Ice Stream

=== Owen Ridge ===
79°50′S 84°50′W

- Arsela Peak
- Bolgrad Glacier
- Bowers Corner
- Brook Glacier
- Karnare Col
- Kasilag Pass
- Krusha Peak
- Lishness Peak
- Modren Peak
- Mount Allen
- Mount Inderbitzen
- Mount Southwick
- Mount Strybing
- Peristera Peak
- Sirma Glacier
- Stikal Peak

=== Petvar Heights ===
78°46′30″S 84°20′20″W

- Bagra Peak
- Carey Glacier
- Divdyadovo Glacier
- Fruzhin Peak
- Gabare Glacier
- Hudman Glacier
- Kasilag Pass
- Kornicker Glacier
- Long Peak
- Malkoch Peak
- Marze Peak
- Miller Peak
- Mount Landolt
- Mount Mullen
- Mountainview Ridge
- Razboyna Glacier
- Ruset Peak
- Thomas Glacier
- Wessbecher Glacier

=== Sostra Heights ===
77°53′00″S 85°28′00″W

- Anchialus Glacier
- Blenika Peak
- Bracken Peak
- Embree Glacier
- Mount Lanning
- Mount Malone
- Mount McKeown
- Newcomer Glacier
- Robinson Pass
- Sabazios Glacier
- Skaklya Glacier
- Vit Ice Piedmont
- Zhenda Glacier

=== Sullivan Heights ===
78°19′S 85°3′W

- Crosswell Glacier
- Dater Glacier
- Johnson Col
- Mamarchev Peak
- Mount Farrell
- Mount Levack
- Mount Segers
- Nebeska Peak
- Pulpudeva Glacier
- Strinava Glacier
- Vranya Pass
- Zmeevo Pass

=== Veregava Ridge ===
78°26′30″S 84°55′00″W

- Berisad Glacier
- Dater Glacier
- Hansen Glacier
- Kushla Peak
- Manole Pass
- Mount Waldron
- Orizari Glacier
- Parangalitsa Peak
- Sipey Bluff

=== Other features ===
- Ahrida Peak
- Allen Peak
- Arzos Peak
- Aster Glacier
- Beadnos Nunatak
- Bender Glacier
- Bohot Nunatak
- Boyce Ridge
- Branscomb Glacier
- Branscomb Peak
- Brichebor Peak
- Brocks Peak
- Bruguière Peak
- Bugueño Pinnacle
- Burdenis Glacier
- Cairns Glacier
- Cervellati Glacier
- Chaplin Peak
- Clinch Peak
- Corbet Peak
- Craddock Massif
- Craig Ridge
- Damien Gildea
- Debren Pass
- Della Pia Glacier
- Delyo Glacier
- Donnellan Glacier
- Doyran Heights
- Drama Glacier
- Duridanov Peak
- Elfring Peak
- Enitsa Peak
- Epperly Ridge
- Evans Peak
- Eyer Peak
- Fisher Nunatak
- Flowers Hills
- Fonfon Glacier
- Frontier Nunataks
- Fukushima Peak
- Galicia Peak
- Gerila Glacier
- Gilbert Spur
- Gildea Glacier
- Giles Glacier
- Goloe Pass
- Goodge Col
- Hammer Col
- Hariton Peak
- Helfert Nunatak
- Hinkley Glacier
- Hollister Peak
- Holth Peaks
- Howard Nunataks
- Ichev Nunatak
- Jacobsen Valley
- Knutzen Peak
- Kovil Nunatak
- Lanz Peak
- Long Gables
- MacDonald Peak
- Marts Peak
- Memolli Nunatak
- Miller Peak
- Minnesota Glacier
- Mount Alf
- Mount Anderson
- Mount Atkinson
- Mount Barden
- Mount Bearskin
- Mount Bentley
- Mount Besch
- Mount Craddock
- Mount Crawford
- Mount Dalrymple
- Mount Davis
- Mount Dawson
- Mount Epperly
- Mount Gardner
- Mount Giovinetto
- Mount Goldthwait
- Mount Hale
- Mount Holmboe
- Mount Hubley
- Mount Jumper
- Mount Liavaag
- Mount Liptak
- Mount Lymburner
- Mount Milton
- Mount Morris
- Mount Osborne
- Mount Ostenso
- Mount Press
- Mount Reimer
- Mount Rutford
- Mount Sharp
- Mount Shear
- Mount Shinn
- Mount Sisu
- Mount Slaughter
- Mount Tegge
- Mount Todd
- Mount Viets
- Mount Wyatt Earp
- Moyher Ridge
- Mursalitsa Peak
- Nell Peak
- Nikola Peak
- Obelya Glacier
- Olsen Peak
- Opalchenie Peak
- Ostrusha Nunatak
- Owen Ridge
- Pastrogor Peak
- Patton Glacier
- Podgore Saddle
- Ponor Saddle
- Príncipe de Asturias Peak
- Progled Saddle
- Rada Peak
- Ramorino Glacier
- Ranuli Ice Piedmont
- Ravulya Nunatak
- Roché Glacier
- Rumyana Glacier
- Saltzman Glacier
- Sanchez Peak
- Schatz Ridge
- Schoening Peak
- Severinghaus Glacier
- Shinn Ridge
- Shockey Peak
- Silverstein Peak
- Silyanov Peak
- Skafida Peak
- Sowers Glacier
- Stolnik Peak
- Strahil Peak
- Taylor Ledge
- Toros Peak
- Tulaczyk Glacier
- Tyree Ridge
- Valchan Peak
- Vanand Peak
- Veregava Ridge
- Versinikia Peak
- Vinson Massif
- Vinson Plateau
- Wahlstrom Peak
- Willis Ridge
- Zalmoxis Peak
- Zapol Glacier
- Zinsmeister Ridge
- Zvegor Saddle
