= Mount Davis (Antarctica) =

Mountain in Antarctica

Location of Sentinel Range in Western Antarctica

Sentinel Range map

Mount Davis (78°06′S 86°15′W) is a mountain located 1.6 km north of Mount Bentley and 2.4 km southeast of Mount Hale in the Sentinel Range, Antarctica. Discovered by the Marie Byrd Land Traverse party of 1957–58, under Charles R. Bentley, and named for Leo E. Davis, geomagnetician and seismologist at Byrd Station in 1957.

== See also ==
- Mountains in Antarctica
