= Frontier Nunataks =

The Frontier Nunataks (78°21′S 88°6′W) are a small isolated group of nunataks lying about 20 nautical miles (40 km) west of the Sentinel Range of the Ellsworth Mountains, Antarctica. The nunataks were visited by geologist Thomas Bastien of the University of Minnesota Geological Party, 1963–64, and so named because they are the extreme western outlier of the Ellsworth Mountains.
