= Craig Ridge =

Craig Ridge (77°31′S 86°4′W) is a small rock ridge located close northeast of Polarstar Peak in the Sentinel Range, Ellsworth Mountains. It was named by the University of Minnesota Geological Party to these mountains, 1963–64, for James A. Craig, a helicopter crew chief with the 62nd Transportation Corps Detachment, who assisted the party. The geological party found a fossil leaf of the plant Glossopteris on the ridge.
