= Sabazios Glacier =

Glacier in Antarctica

- Location of Sentinel Range in Western Antarctica

- Location within Antarctica
- Type: tributary
- Location: Ellsworth Land
- Coordinates: 77°51′00″S 85°48′00″W
- Length: 10 nautical miles (19 km; 12 mi)
- Width: 3 nautical miles (5.6 km; 3.5 mi)
- Thickness: unknown
- Terminus: Newcomer Glacier
- Status: unknown

Map of northern Sentinel Range

Sabazios Glacier (Bulgarian: ледник Сабазий, romanized: lednik Sabaziy, IPA: [ˈlɛdnik sɐˈbazij]) is the 10 nautical miles (19 km; 12 mi) long and 3 nautical miles (5.6 km; 3.5 mi) wide glacier on the east side of northern Sentinel Range in Ellsworth Mountains, Antarctica. It is situated south of Newcomer Glacier, west of Anchialus Glacier, north of Embree Glacier, and east of Zhenda Glacier and Skaklya Glacier. The glacier drains the east slopes of Mount Alf and Mount Sharp, and the north slopes of the side ridge that trends 9.15 km from Mount Dalrymple on the main crest of Sentinel Range east-northeast to Robinson Pass, flows northwards and joins Newcomer Glacier northwest of Mount Lanning in Sostra Heights.

The glacier is named after the Thracian god Sabazios.

== Location ==
Sabazios Glacier is centred at 77°51′00″S 85°48′00″W. US mapping in 1961.

== Tributary Glaciers ==
- Zhenda Glacier
- Skaklya Glacier

== See also ==
- List of glaciers in the Antarctic
- Glaciology

== Maps ==
- Newcomer Glacier. Scale 1:250 000 topographic map. Reston, Virginia: US Geological Survey, 1961.
- Antarctic Digital Database (ADD). Scale 1:250000 topographic map of Antarctica. Scientific Committee on Antarctic Research (SCAR). Since 1993, regularly updated.
