= Allen Peak =

Mountain in Ellsworth Land, Antarctica

Location of Sentinel Range in Western Antarctica.

Northern Sentinel Range map.

Allen Peak (77°34′S 86°51′W) is a 1,880-metre (6,170 ft) peak in Antarctica, standing 5 nautical miles (9 km) west of Mount Wyatt Earp and forming the northern extremity of the main ridge of the Sentinel Range. It was discovered by Lincoln Ellsworth on his trans-Antarctic flight of 23 November 1935, and named by the Advisory Committee on Antarctic Names after Robert J. Allen Jr., a United States Geological Survey (USGS) cartographer and Antarctic specialist, 1950–79, a consultant to the USGS Branch of International Activities from 1980, and a member of the Branch of Special Maps, who helped prepare the 1962 map of this range.

== See also ==
- Mountains in Antarctica
