= Fisher Nunatak =

Coordinates: 77°43′S 87°27′W

Location of Sentinel Range in Western Antarctica.

Northern Sentinel Range map.

Fisher Nunatak is a nunatak with rock exposure, standing 13 nautical miles (24 km) west of Mount Crawford of the Sentinel Range, in the Ellsworth Mountains of Antarctica. It was discovered by the Marie Byrd Land Traverse party, 1957–58, under Charles R. Bentley, and was named for Diana D. Fisher, director, Glaciological Headquarters, of the United States – International Geophysical Year Program, 1956–59.
