= Kovil Nunatak =

Location of Sentinel Range in Western Antarctica.

Map of northern Sentinel Range.

Kovil Nunatak (Bulgarian: Ковилски нунатак, ‘Kovilski Nunatak’ \'ko-vil-ski 'nu-na-tak\) is the rock-tipped hill of elevation 2041 m projecting from the ice cap west of north-central Sentinel Range in Ellsworth Mountains, Antarctica. It is named after the settlement of Kovil in Southern Bulgaria.

== Location ==
Kovil Nunatak is located at 78°02′20.3″S 87°02′59″W, which is 24.93 km west of Mount Goldthwait, 12.68 km northwest of Mount Hubley and 15.46 km southeast of Helfert Nunatak. US mapping in 1961.

== Maps ==
- Newcomer Glacier. Scale 1:250 000 topographic map. Reston, Virginia: US Geological Survey, 1961.
- Antarctic Digital Database (ADD). Scale 1:250000 topographic map of Antarctica. Scientific Committee on Antarctic Research (SCAR). Since 1993, regularly updated.
