= Mount Dalrymple =

Mountain in Ellsworth Land, Antarctica

Location of Sentinel Range in Western Antarctica.

Northern Sentinel Range map.

Mount Dalrymple (77°56′S 86°03′W) is a mountain (3,600 m) between Mount Alf and Mount Goldthwait in the northern part of the Sentinel Range, Antarctica. It surmounts Sabazios Glacier to the north-northeast and Embree Glacier to the southeast.

The mountain was mapped by the Marie Byrd Land Traverse party of 1957–58, under Charles R. Bentley, and named by the Advisory Committee on Antarctic Names for Paul C. Dalrymple, meteorologist, member of the wintering party at Little America V in 1957 and the South Pole Station in 1958.

== See also ==
- Mountains in Antarctica
