= Branscomb Peak =

Mountain in Antarctica

Location of Sentinel Range in Western Antarctica.

Central and southern Sentinel Range map.

Branscomb Peak is a small snowy prominence of elevation 4,520 metres (14,830 ft), the highest point of the ridge that forms the top of the main west face of Vinson Massif in the Sentinel Range of the Ellsworth Mountains, Antarctica. It overlooks Jacobsen Valley to the northeast, Goodge Col to the north-northeast, the upper section of Branscomb Glacier to the west, and Roché Glacier to the south.

The peak was named by US-ACAN in 2006 in association with adjacent Branscomb Glacier.

== Location ==
Branscomb Peak is located at 78°30′57″S 85°41′44″W, which is 1.27 miles (2.04 km) northwest of Mount Vinson, 2.29 miles (3.69 km) north-northwest of Silverstein Peak, 3.68 miles (5.92 km) east-southeast of Knutzen Peak and 3.74 miles (6.02 km) south of Mount Shinn. US mapping in 1961, updated in 1988.

== See also ==
- Mountains in Antarctica

== Maps ==
- Vinson Massif. Scale 1:250 000 topographic map. Reston, Virginia: US Geological Survey, 1988.
- Antarctic Digital Database (ADD). Scale 1:250000 topographic map of Antarctica. Scientific Committee on Antarctic Research (SCAR). Since 1993, regularly updated.
