= Velasco Glacier =

Glacier in Antarctica

- Location within Antarctica
- Location: Walgreen Coast
- Coordinates: 74°16′S 101°11′W
- Length: 5 nmi (9 km; 6 mi)
- Thickness: unknown
- Status: unknown

Velasco Glacier (74°16′S 101°11′W) is a glacier about 5 nautical miles (9 km) long flowing west from Walgreen Coast toward the Backer Islands. It was named by the Advisory Committee on Antarctic Names (US-ACAN) after Miguel G. Velasco, a United States Geological Survey (USGS) computer specialist, and part of the USGS team that compiled the Advanced Very High Resolution Radiometer 1:5,000,000-scale maps of Antarctica in the 1990s.

== See also ==
- List of glaciers in the Antarctic
- Glaciology
