= Mount Shinn =

Mountain in Ellsworth Land, Antarctica

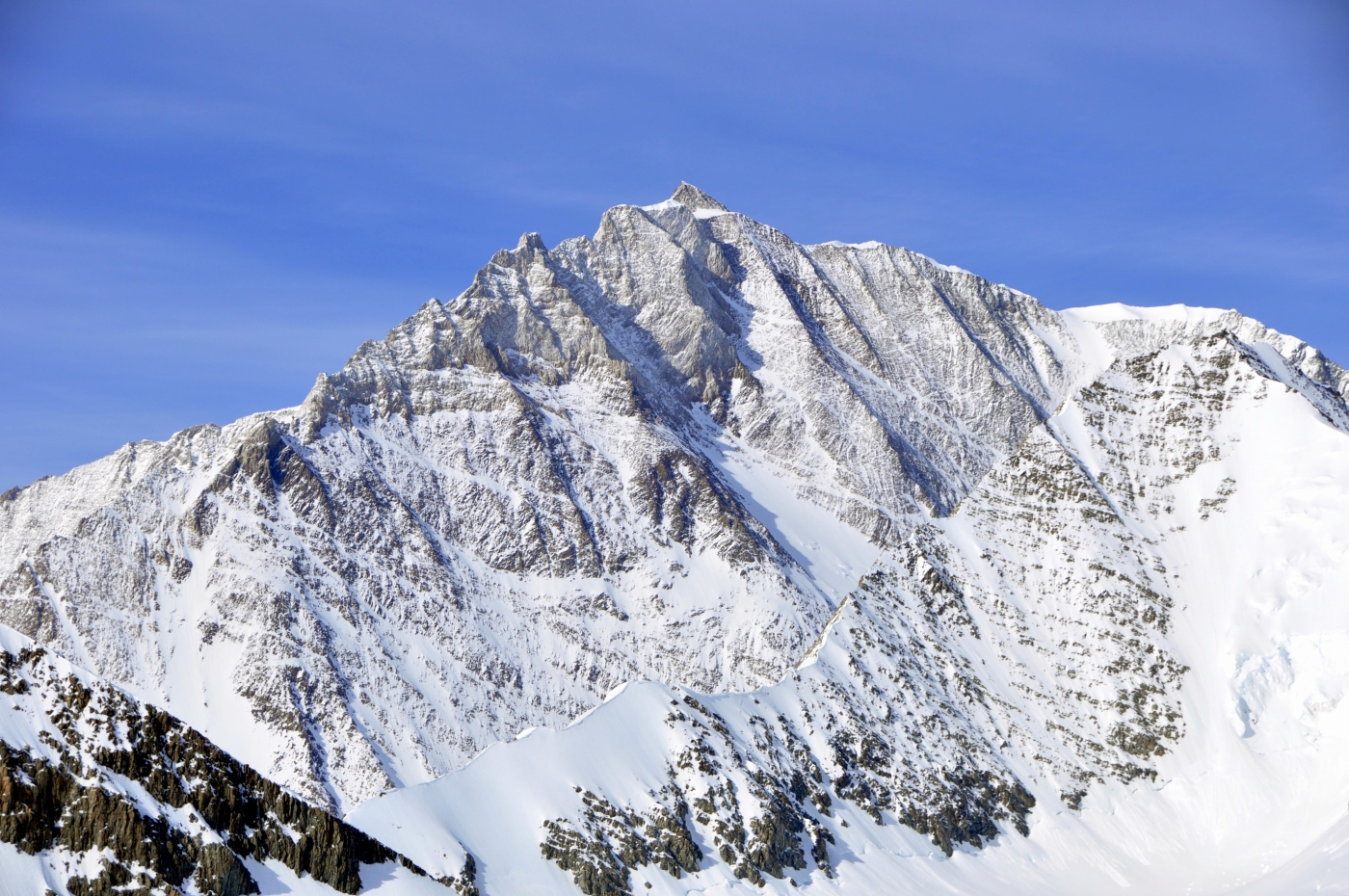
- Mount Shinn from North East

Highest point
- Elevation: 4,661 m (15,292 ft)
- Prominence: 961 m (3,153 ft)
- Listing: Seven Third Summits
- Coordinates: 78°27′49″S 85°43′29″W

Geography
- Location within Antarctica
- Location: Antarctica
- Parent range: Sentinel Range, Ellsworth Mountains

Climbing
- First ascent: 21 December 1966 by Barry Corbet, Charles Hollister, Sam Silverstein and Richard Wahlstrom

Location of Sentinel Range in Western Antarctica.

Sentinel Range map.

Mount Shinn is a mountain 4,661 meters in elevation, standing 6 km (4 miles) southeast of Mount Tyree in the Sentinel Range, Ellsworth Mountains in Antarctica. It surmounts Ramorino Glacier to the north, upper Crosswell Glacier to the northeast, Goodge Col to the southeast, and Branscomb Glacier to the south-southwest. Mount Shinn is thought to be the third-highest peak in Antarctica.

The peak was discovered on IGY reconnaissance flights in January 1958, and named by the Advisory Committee on Antarctic Names (US-ACAN) for Lieutenant Commander Conrad S. (Gus) Shinn, U.S. Navy, a pilot on some of these flights. Shinn was pilot of the Navy R4D aircraft carrying Admiral Dufek which, on October 31, 1956, made the first plane landing at the geographic South Pole. It had been thought to be over 4800m high, but was re-measured in 2001 by Damien Gildea and Rodrigo Fica of the Omega Foundation, using a Trimble 5700 GPS receiver and the Australian government's AUSPOS processing system.

Due to its vicinity to the more coveted Mount Vinson, Mt. Shinn has been climbed numerous times as a side trip on a Vinson expedition.

== Maps ==
- Vinson Massif. Scale 1:250 000 topographic map. Reston, Virginia: US Geological Survey, 1988.
- Antarctic Digital Database (ADD). Scale 1:250000 topographic map of Antarctica. Scientific Committee on Antarctic Research (SCAR), 1993–2016.
