= Mount Atkinson =

Mountain in Ellsworth Land, Antarctica

Location of Sentinel Range in Western Antarctica.

Sentinel Range map.

Mount Atkinson (78°39′S 85°29′W) is a prominent mountain 3.5 miles (6 km) west-southwest of Mount Craddock in the Sentinel Range, Antarctica. Mapped by United States Geological Survey (USGS) from surveys and U.S. Navy aerial photographs, 1957–60. Named by Advisory Committee on Antarctic Names (US-ACAN) after Richard C. Atkinson, Director, National Science Foundation, 1977–80.

== See also ==
- Mountains in Antarctica
