= Lanz Peak =

Mountain in Antarctica

Location of Sentinel Range in Western Antarctica.

Northern Sentinel Range map.

Lanz Peak (77°17′S 86°17′W) is a peak, 1,570 metres (5,150 ft) high, near the extreme northern end of the Sentinel Range in the Ellsworth Mountains of Antarctica. It is 10 nautical miles (19 km) north-northwest of Mount Weems and is the middle one of a group of three peaks lying in a northeast–southwest direction. The peak was discovered by Lincoln Ellsworth on his trans-Antarctic flight of November 23, 1935, and was named by the Advisory Committee on Antarctic Names for Walter J. Lanz, a radio operator on three Ellsworth Antarctic expeditions between 1933 and 1936.

== See also ==
- Mountains in Antarctica
