= Mursalitsa Peak =

Mountain in Ellsworth Land, Antarctica

Location of Sentinel Range in Western Antarctica.

Map of northern Sentinel Range.

Mursalitsa Peak (Bulgarian: връх Мурсалица, romanized: vrah Mursalitsa, IPA: [ˈvrɤx morˈsalit͡sɐ]) is the mostly ice-covered peak on the west side of northern Sentinel Range in Ellsworth Mountains, Antarctica rising to 2334 m on the side ridge extending from Mount Sharp on the main crest of the range. It is named after Mursalitsa Ridge in the Rhodope Mountains, Bulgaria.

== Location ==
Mursalitsa Peak is located at 77°55′16″S 86°21′10″W, which is 5.8 km southwest of Mount Barden, 7.24 km west of Mount Sharp, 11.73 km north of Brocks Peak and 24.7 km east of Helfert Nunatak. US mapping in 1961.

== See also ==
- Mountains in Antarctica

== Maps ==
- Newcomer Glacier. Scale 1:250 000 topographic map. Reston, Virginia: US Geological Survey, 1961.
- Antarctic Digital Database (ADD). Scale 1:250000 topographic map of Antarctica. Scientific Committee on Antarctic Research (SCAR). Since 1993, regularly updated.
