= Knutzen Peak =

Mountain in Antarctica

Location of Sentinel Range in Western Antarctica.

Central and southern Sentinel Range map.

Knutzen Peak is a sharp, rocky summit of elevation 3,373 metres (11,066 ft) standing on the north edge of Taylor Ledge in the Sentinel Range of the Ellsworth Mountains, Antarctica. It surmounts Branscomb Glacier to the east and south.

The peak was named by US-ACAN in 2006 after Donald H. Knutzen, topographic engineer with the U.S. Geological Survey in the Sentinel Range, 1979–80.

== Location ==
Knutzen Peak is located at 78°29′47″S 85°56′35″W, which is 3.83 miles (6.16 km) southwest of Mount Shinn, 3.68 miles (5.92 km) west-northwest of Branscomb Peak and 5.1 miles (8.2 km) north of Brichebor Peak. US mapping in 1961, updated in 1988.

== See also ==
- Mountains in Antarctica

== Maps ==
- Vinson Massif. Scale 1:250 000 topographic map. Reston, Virginia: US Geological Survey, 1988.
- Antarctic Digital Database (ADD). Scale 1:250000 topographic map of Antarctica. Scientific Committee on Antarctic Research (SCAR). Since 1993, regularly updated.
