= Mount Lymburner =

Mountain in Ellsworth Land, Antarctica

Location of Sentinel Range in Western Antarctica.

Northern Sentinel Range map.

Mount Lymburner (77°26′S 86°30′W) is a mountain, 1,940 metres (6,360 ft) high, standing 4 nautical miles (7 km) west-northwest of Mount Weems near the north end of the Sentinel Range in the Ellsworth Mountains of Antarctica. It was discovered by Lincoln Ellsworth on his trans-Antarctic flight of November 23, 1935, and was named by the Advisory Committee on Antarctic Names for J.H. Lymburner, an assistant pilot on Ellsworth's expedition.

== See also ==
- Mountains in Antarctica
