= Mount Ostenso =

Mountain in Ellsworth Land, Antarctica

Location of Sentinel Range in Western Antarctica.

Sentinel Range map.

Mount Ostenso (78°18′S 86°11′W) is a mountain (4,180 m) 2 nautical miles (3.7 km) south of Mount Giovinetto in the main ridge of the Sentinel Range, Antarctica. First mapped by the Marie Byrd Land Traverse Party (1957–58) led by Charles R. Bentley, and named for Ned A. Ostenso, traverse seismologist at Byrd Station (1957) and a member of the party.

== See also ==
- Mountains in Antarctica
