= Chavez Glacier =

Glacier in Antarctica

- Location within Antarctica
- Location: Ellsworth Land
- Coordinates: 73°55′S 101°15′W
- Length: 10 nmi (19 km; 12 mi)
- Thickness: unknown
- Terminus: Cranton Bay
- Status: unknown

Chavez Glacier (73°55′S 101°15′W) is a glacier about 10 nmi (19 km; 12 mi) long flowing south from Canisteo Peninsula into Cranton Bay. It was named by the Advisory Committee on Antarctic Names after Pat Chavez of the United States Geological Survey (USGS), Flagstaff, Arizona, co-leader of the USGS team that compiled the 1:5,000,000-scale Advanced Very High Resolution Radiometer maps of Antarctica in the 1990s.

== See also ==
- List of glaciers in the Antarctic
- Glaciology
