= Epperly Ridge =

Ridge in Antarctica

Location of Vinson Massif in Western Antarctica.

Central and southern Sentinel Range map.

Epperly Ridge (78°25′00″S 85°45′00″W) is a rock ridge that extends northeast for 4 nautical miles (7.4 km) from Mount Epperly, in the Sentinel Range of the Ellsworth Mountains. It was named by the Advisory Committee on Antarctic Names in 2006 in association with Mount Epperly.

== Maps ==
- Vinson Massif. Scale 1:250 000 topographic map. Reston, Virginia: US Geological Survey, 1988.
- Antarctic Digital Database (ADD). Scale 1:250000 topographic map of Antarctica. Scientific Committee on Antarctic Research (SCAR). Since 1993, regularly updated.
