= Patleyna Glacier =

Glacier in Antarctica

- Location of Sentinel Range in Western Antarctica

- Location within Antarctica
- Type: tributary
- Location: Ellsworth Land
- Coordinates: 78°03′50″S 85°47′20″W
- Length: 3.4 nautical miles (6.3 km; 3.9 mi)
- Width: 1.5 nautical miles (2.8 km; 1.7 mi)
- Thickness: unknown
- Terminus: Embree Glacier
- Status: unknown

Sentinel Range map

Patleyna Glacier (Bulgarian: ледник Патлейна, romanized: lednik Patleyna, IPA: [ˈlɛdnik patˈlɛjnɐ]) is the 3.4 nautical miles (6.3 km; 3.9 mi) long and 1.5 nautical miles (2.8 km; 1.7 mi) wide glacier on the east side of north-central Sentinel Range in Ellsworth Mountains, Antarctica, situated north of the upper course of Ellen Glacier. It is draining the east slopes of Mount Todd and the north slopes of Chepino Saddle, and flowing north-northwestwards to join Embree Glacier southeast of Mount Goldthwait and west of Oreshak Peak.

The glacier is named after the nature reserve of Patleyna in Northeastern Bulgaria.

== Location ==
Patleyna Glacier is centred at 78°03′50″S 85°47′20″W. US mapping in 1961, updated in 1988.

== See also ==
- List of glaciers in the Antarctic
- Glaciology

== Maps ==
- Vinson Massif. Scale 1:250 000 topographic map. Reston, Virginia: US Geological Survey, 1988.
- Antarctic Digital Database (ADD). Scale 1:250000 topographic map of Antarctica. Scientific Committee on Antarctic Research (SCAR). Since 1993, regularly updated.
