= Mount Liavaag =

Mountain in Antarctica

Location of Sentinel Range in Western Antarctica.

Northern Sentinel Range map.

Mount Liavaag (77°22′S 86°29′W) is a mountain, 1,820 metres (5,970 ft) high, between Mount Holmboe and the Holth Peaks near the northern end of the Sentinel Range in the Ellsworth Mountains of Antarctica. It was discovered by Lincoln Ellsworth on his trans-Antarctic flight of November 23, 1935, and was named by the Advisory Committee on Antarctic Names for First Mate Liavaag of the Wyatt Earp in 1935–36, and also a member of Ellsworth's two earlier Antarctic expeditions.

== See also ==
- Mountains in Antarctica
