= Mount Anderson (Antarctica) =

Mountain in Antarctica

- Location within Antarctica

Highest point
- Elevation: 4,254 m (13,957 ft)
- Prominence: 1,504 m (4,934 ft)
- Listing: Ultras of Antarctica, Ribu
- Coordinates: 78.15°S 86.217°W

Geography
- Location: Antarctica
- Parent range: Sentinel Range, (Ellsworth Mountains)

Climbing
- First ascent: January 7th 2007 - Jed Brown (US) & Damien Gildea (AUS)

Location of Sentinel Range in Western Antarctica.

Sentinel Range map.

Mount Anderson is a high mountain in the northern part of the Sentinel Range in Ellsworth Mountains, Antarctica. Probuda Ridge is trending northeast of the peak, and Embree Glacier and Ellen Glacier's tributary Fonfon Glacier drain its northeastern and eastern slopes respectively. It is part of the same massif as Mount Bentley and Mount Sisu.

The mountain was discovered by the Marie Byrd Land Traverse Party, 1957–58, under Charles R. Bentley, and named for Vernon H. Anderson, glaciologist at Byrd Station, 1957, a member of the party.

== See also ==
- List of ultras of Antarctica

== Maps ==
- Vinson Massif. Scale 1:250 000 topographic map. Reston, Virginia: US Geological Survey, 1988.
- Antarctic Digital Database (ADD). Scale 1:250000 topographic map of Antarctica. Scientific Committee on Antarctic Research (SCAR). Since 1993, regularly updated.
