= Ramorino Glacier =

Glacier in Antarctica

- Location of Vinson Massif in Western Antarctica

- Location within Antarctica
- Type: tributary
- Location: Ellsworth Land
- Coordinates: 78°24′00″S 85°38′00″W
- Length: 4.5 nautical miles (8.3 km; 5.2 mi)
- Thickness: unknown
- Terminus: Crosswell Glacier
- Status: unknown

Central and southern Sentinel Range map.

Ramorino Glacier (78°24′S 85°38′W) is the 4.5 nautical miles (8.3 km; 5.2 mi) long glacier situated northwest of upper Crosswell Glacier and southeast of Cervellati Glacier on the east slope of Sentinel Range in the Ellsworth Mountains, Antarctica. It flows northeastwards between Epperly Ridge and Shinn Ridge, and enters Crosswell Glacier northwest of Mount Segers. The feature was named by US-ACAN in 2006 after Maria Chiara Ramorino, manager of the Italian team that compiled and promulgated the SCAR Composite Gazetteer of Antarctica, 1998–2006.

== Maps ==
- Vinson Massif. Scale 1:250 000 topographic map. Reston, Virginia: US Geological Survey, 1988.
- Antarctic Digital Database (ADD). Scale 1:250000 topographic map of Antarctica. Scientific Committee on Antarctic Research (SCAR). Since 1993, regularly updated.

== See also ==
- List of glaciers in the Antarctic
- Glaciology
