= Zhenda Glacier =

Mountain glacier in Antarctica

- Location of Sentinel Range in Western Antarctica.

- Location within Antarctica
- Location: Sentinel Range; Ellsworth Land
- Coordinates: 77°53′00″S 86°00′00″W
- Length: 4.3 nmi (8 km; 5 mi)
- Width: 2.6 nmi (5 km; 3 mi)
- Thickness: unknown
- Status: unknown

Map of northern Sentinel Range.

Zhenda Glacier (Bulgarian: ледник Женда, romanized: lednik Zhenda, IPA: [ˈlɛdniɡ ˈʒɛndɐ]) is the 8 km long and 4.8 km wide glacier on the east side of the main crest of northern Sentinel Range in Ellsworth Mountains, Antarctica. It is situated west of Sabazios Glacier and southeast of Skaklya Glacier. The glacier drains the northeast slopes of Mount Sharp and the east slopes of Mount Barden, flows northeastwards and together with Skaklya Glacier joins Sabazios Glacier west of Mount Lanning in Sostra Heights.

The glacier is named after the settlement of Zhenda in Southern Bulgaria.

== Location ==
Zhenda Glacier is centred at 77°53′00″S 86°00′00″W. US mapping in 1961.

== See also ==
- List of glaciers in the Antarctic
- Glaciology

== Maps ==
- Newcomer Glacier. Scale 1:250 000 topographic map. Reston, Virginia: US Geological Survey, 1961.
- Antarctic Digital Database (ADD). Scale 1:250000 topographic map of Antarctica. Scientific Committee on Antarctic Research (SCAR). Since 1993, regularly updated.
