= HMAS Wyatt Earp =

Motor vessel commissioned into the Royal Australian Navy

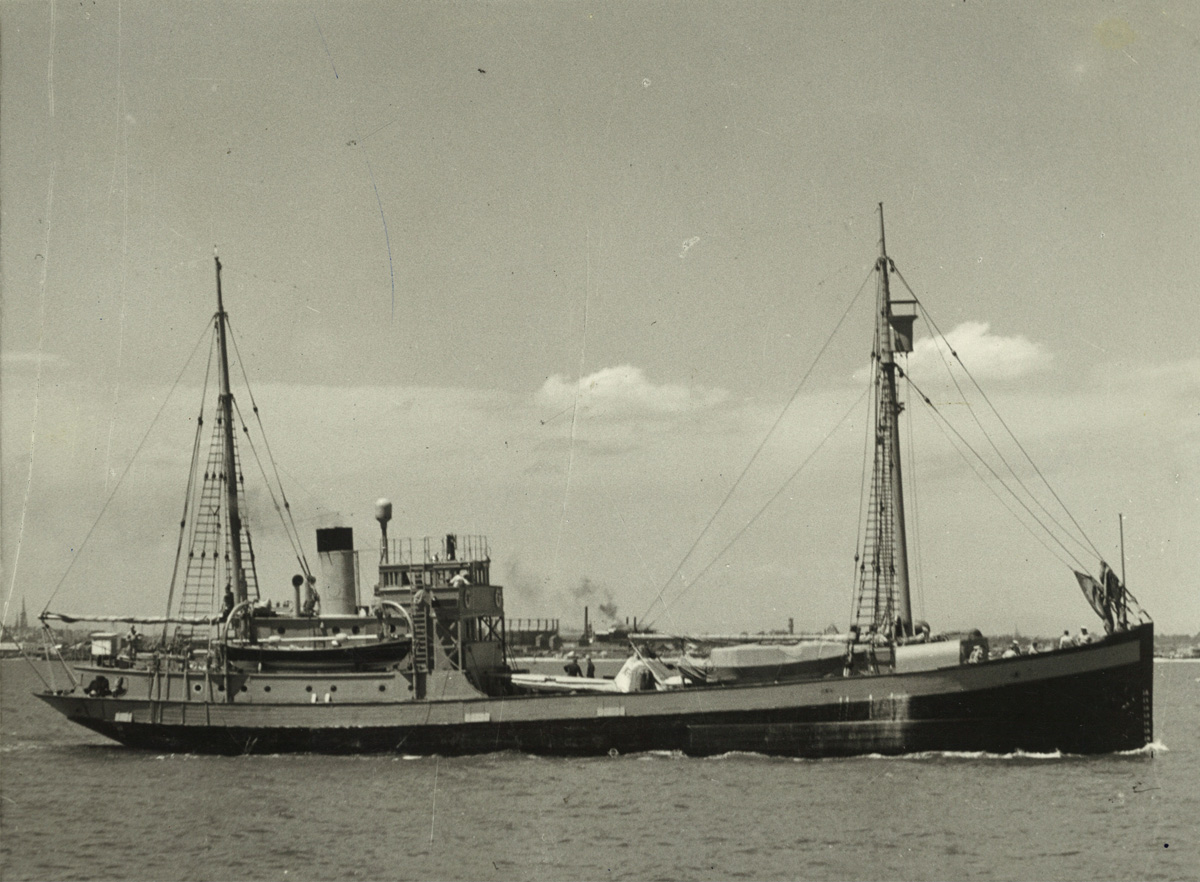
- Sailing for Antarctica from Williamstown, Victoria, 19 December 1947.

History

Australia
- Name: Wyatt Earp
- Namesake: Wyatt Earp
- Builder: Bolsønes Shipyard, Molde, Norway
- Laid down: 1918
- Launched: 1919
- Acquired: February 1939
- Commissioned: 25 October 1939
- Decommissioned: 19 July 1944
- Renamed: FV Fanefjord, MV Wyatt Earp, HMAS Wongala, HMAS Wyatt Earp, MV Wongala, MV Natone
- Reclassified: Antarctic supply ship
- Stricken: 30 June 1948
- Reinstated: 17 November 1947
- Home port: Adelaide, South Australia and Melbourne
- Fate: Aground, 23–24 January 1959

General characteristics
- Displacement: 408 tonnes (402 tons)
- Length: 41.3 m (135 ft)
- Beam: 8.9 m (29 ft)
- Draught: 4.4 m (14 ft)
- Propulsion: 2 × diesels driving single screw
- Speed: 8.5 knots (15.7 km/h; 9.8 mph)
- Range: 11,000 nautical miles (20,000 km; 13,000 mi)
- Endurance: 63 days at 8 knots (15 km/h; 9.2 mph)
- Armament: 1 × Oerlikon 20 mm cannon, Machine guns
- Aircraft carried: 1–2 OS2U Kingfisher amphibian, carried as deck cargo

HMAS Wyatt Earp (formerly known as FV Fanefjord, MV Wyatt Earp, and HMAS Wongala) was a motor vessel commissioned into the Royal Australian Navy (RAN) from 1939 to 1945 and again from 1947 to 1948.

== Early years ==
The ship was constructed as a single-deck motor vessel named FV Fanejord, built from pine and oak for the Norwegian herring fishing trade. While being a motorised vessel, her masts and booms normally used for cargo handling were capable of being rigged for sailing in an emergency. She was purchased by the American explorer and aviator, Lincoln Ellsworth, for his 1933 Antarctic expedition, refitted and sheathed with oak and armour plate, and renamed Wyatt Earp after the marshal of Dodge City and Tombstone, Arizona. Wyatt Earp was used on four of Ellsworth's Antarctic expeditions between 1933 and 1939, primarily as a base ship for his aircraft. Mount Wyatt Earp, discovered on Ellesworth's trans-Antarctic flight of Nov. 23, 1935 in the northern part of the Sentinel Range, is named for the ship.

== Navy service ==
In February 1939, Wyatt Earp was purchased from Ellsworth by the Government of Australia and handed over to the RAN, which intended to use the ship as a Fleet Auxiliary (Ammunition and Store Carrier). In September 1939, it was decided to rename her Boomerang, but the name was already in use by another Australian vessel. Instead, the ship was commissioned on 25 October 1939 as Wongala, an Aboriginal Australian word meaning boomerang.

Wongala made one trip as a Royal Australian Fleet Auxiliary, leaving Sydney on 14 November 1939 bound for Darwin with a cargo of stores. On return to Sydney in January 1940, she was laid up pending future employment, but was reactivated and moved to Port Adelaide in South Australia, where she served with the Examination Service until late 1943. From November 1943 to March 1944, Wongala served as Guard Ship at Whyalla, South Australia, whilst also patrolling off Port Pirie and Wallaroo. In late March 1944, Wongala arrived at Port Adelaide to await disposal, and was paid off on 19 July 1944.

=== Cadet service ===
Before her disposal, the Minister for the Navy received a request in March 1945 from the South Australian Branch of the Boy Scouts Association, that the ship be made available for Sea Cadet training.

=== Antarctic service with the Navy ===
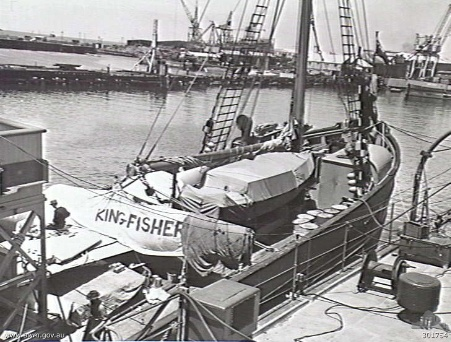
Preparations for sailing for Antarctica from Williamstown, Victoria, 19 December 1947

In February 1947, the Scouts Association was notified by the Department of the Navy that the Federal Government was considering renewing Antarctic exploration. The Association was requested to return the vessel, which was inspected to determine her suitability for conversion to an Antarctic exploration vessel. The conversion was approved, and in June 1947, prior to her impending voyage to the Antarctic, it was decided to recommission the ship under the name she had used during her previous visits to the Antarctic with explorer Lincoln Ellsworth. The ship was recommissioned on 17 November 1947 at Port Adelaide as HMAS Wyatt Earp. Following a visit by Antarctic explorer Sir Douglas Mawson, Wyatt Earp sailed for Williamstown, Victoria in early December for preparation and loading.

After loading, including an OS2U Kingfisher amphibian of the Royal Australian Air Force, Wyatt Earp left from Nelson Pier, Williamstown on 19 December 1947 and proceeded to Hobart. Gales caused some problems en route. After several days in Hobart, the ship left for the Antarctic on 26 December 1947, but storm damage caused her to return to Melbourne for repairs, leaving again on 8 February 1948.

The weather was intense, particularly beyond 65 degrees South, and a landing at Adélie Land was impossible. She turned towards Macquarie Island and there met HMAS Labuan discharging a team of scientists. Wyatt Earp returned to Melbourne, and her voyaging for Navy ended.

== Later years ==
Wyatt Earp was sold to a commercial operator in late 1951 and was renamed Wongala. A later change of ownership had her called Natone, and under this name she plied the east Australian coast until wrecked in a storm near Double Island Point, Queensland, on the night of 23–24 January 1959.
