= Mount Goldthwait =

Mountain in Ellsworth Land, Antarctica

Coordinates: 77°59′S 86°03′W

Highest point
- Elevation: 3,817 m (12,523 ft)
- Prominence: 1,323 m (4,341 ft)
- Listing: Ribu

Location of Sentinel Range in Western Antarctica.

Northern Sentinel Range map.

Mount Goldthwait is a 3,815 metres (12,516 ft) mountain located 2.5 nautical miles (4.6 km) south of Mount Dalrymple in the north part of the Sentinel Range, Antarctica. Discovered by the Marie Byrd Land Traverse Party of 1957–58, under Charles R. Bentley, and named for Richard P. Goldthwait, consultant, Technical Panel on Glaciology, U.S. National Committee for the IGY, and later Director, Institute of Polar Studies, Ohio State University.

== See also ==
- Mountains in Antarctica
