= Mount Sharp (Antarctica) =

Mountain in Ellsworth Land, Antarctica

Location of Sentinel Range in Western Antarctica.

Northern Sentinel Range map.

Mount Sharp (77°53′S 86°10′W) is a mountain over 3,000 m, standing 2 miles (3.2 km) southeast of Mount Barden in the north part of the Sentinel Range in Western Antarctica. It surmounts Zhenda Glacier to the north and Sabazios Glacier to the east.

The mountain was mapped by the Marie Byrd Land Traverse party of 1957–58, under Charles R. Bentley, which named the mountain for Professor Robert P. Sharp, a member of the Technical Panel on Glaciology, part of the U.S. National Committee for the International Geophysical Year (IGY).
