= Crosswell Glacier =

Glacier in Antarctica

- Location of Vinson Massif in Western Antarctica

- Location within Antarctica
- Type: Valley glacier
- Location: Ellsworth Land
- Coordinates: 78°17′S 85°24′W
- Length: 10 nautical miles (19 km; 12 mi)
- Thickness: unknown
- Terminus: Ellen Glacier
- Status: unknown

Central and southern Sentinel Range map.

Crosswell Glacier (78°17′S 85°24′W) is a glacier 10 nautical miles (19 km; 12 mi) long, flowing north-northeast from Mount Shinn between Sullivan Heights and Bearskin Ridge, in the central part of the Sentinel Range, Ellsworth Mountains, Antarctica. Together with Patton and Pulpudeva Glaciers, it enters Ellen Glacier northwest of Mamarchev Peak and southeast of Mount Jumper.

The glacier was first mapped by the United States Geological Survey from surveys and from U.S. Navy air photos, 1957–59, and named by the Advisory Committee on Antarctic Names for United States Air Force Colonel Horace A. Crosswell, leader of C-124 Globemaster air drops in establishing the scientific station at the South Pole in the 1956–57 season.

== Tributary glaciers ==
- Ramorino Glacier
- Cervellati Glacier

== See also ==
- List of glaciers in the Antarctic
- Glaciology

== Maps ==
- Vinson Massif. Scale 1:250 000 topographic map. Reston, Virginia: US Geological Survey, 1988.
- Antarctic Digital Database (ADD). Scale 1:250000 topographic map of Antarctica. Scientific Committee on Antarctic Research (SCAR). Since 1993, regularly updated.
