= Mount Hubley (Antarctica) =

Mountain in Ellsworth Land, Antarctica

Location of Sentinel Range in Western Antarctica.

Central and southern Sentinel Range map.

Mount Hubley (78°5′S 86°46′W) is a prominent, snow-covered, outlying mountain to the west of Mount Hale, in the Sentinel Range of the Ellsworth Mountains in Antarctica. It was first mapped by the United States Geological Survey from surveys and U.S. Navy air photos from 1957 to 1959, and was named by the Advisory Committee on Antarctic Names for Richard C. Hubley, a member of the Technical Panel on Glaciology in the U.S. National Committee for the International Geophysical Year.

== See also ==
- Mountains in Antarctica

== Maps ==
- Vinson Massif. Scale 1:250 000 topographic map. Reston, Virginia: US Geological Survey, 1988.
- Antarctic Digital Database (ADD). Scale 1:250000 topographic map of Antarctica. Scientific Committee on Antarctic Research (SCAR). Since 1993, regularly updated.
