= Embree Glacier =

Glacier in Antarctica

- Location of Sentinel Range in Western Antarctica

- Location within Antarctica
- Location: Ellsworth Land
- Coordinates: 77°59′S 85°10′W
- Length: 20 nmi (37 km; 23 mi)
- Thickness: unknown
- Terminus: Rutford Ice Stream
- Status: unknown

Sentinel Range map

Embree Glacier is a 20 nautical miles (37 km; 23 mi) long glacier in the north-central part of Sentinel Range, Ellsworth Mountains, draining the eastern slopes of Mount Hale, Mount Davis and Mount Bentley, the northeast slopes of Mount Anderson, and the northwestern slopes of Probuda Ridge, flowing north-northeastwards and north of Mount Schmid turning east to join Rutford Ice Stream east of Mount Tegge. Named by the US-ACAN for Maj. Henry Embree, USAF, who participated in the establishment of the South Pole Station in 1956. Embree Glacier is in Antarctica.

== Location ==
Embree Glacier is centred at 77°59′00″S 85°10′00″W. US mapping in 1961, updated in 1988.

== Tributary glaciers ==
- Kopsis Glacier
- Padala Glacier
- Marsa Glacier
- Patleyna Glacier

== See also ==
- List of glaciers in the Antarctic
- Glaciology

== Maps ==
- Vinson Massif. Scale 1:250 000 topographic map. Reston, Virginia: US Geological Survey, 1988.
- Antarctic Digital Database (ADD). Scale 1:250000 topographic map of Antarctica. Scientific Committee on Antarctic Research (SCAR). Since 1993, regularly updated.
