= Tyree Ridge =

Tyree Ridge (78°23′00″S 85°40′00″W) is a narrow rock ridge that extends northeast for 3 nautical miles (5.6 km) from Mount Tyree in the Sentinel Range of the Ellsworth Mountains. It was named by the Advisory Committee on Antarctic Names in 2006, in association with Mount Tyree.
