= Helfert Nunatak =

Location of Sentinel Range in Western Antarctica.

Northern Sentinel Range map.

Helfert Nunatak (77°53′S 87°25′W) is a prominent rock nunatak standing 15 nautical miles (28 km) west of Mount Sharp of the Sentinel Range, in the Ellsworth Mountains of Antarctica. It was discovered and visited by the Marie Byrd Land Traverse party, 1957–58, under Charles R. Bentley, and named for Norbert F. Helfert, a meteorologist at Byrd Station in 1957.
