= Mount Crawford (Antarctica) =

Mountain in Ellsworth Land, Antarctica

Coordinates: 77°43′S 86°28′W

Location of Sentinel Range in Western Antarctica.

Northern Sentinel Range map.

Mount Crawford is a mountain with two summits, 2,360 and 2,255 metres (7,740 and 7,400 ft), standing 3.5 miles (5.6 km) northwest of Mount Dawson in the northern part of the main ridge of the Sentinel Range. It was discovered by Lincoln Ellsworth on his trans-Antarctic flight of November 23, 1935, and named by the Advisory Committee on Antarctic Names for William B. Crawford, Jr., of the Branch of Special Maps, U.S. Geological Survey, which prepared the 1962 map of this range.

== See also ==
- Mountains in Antarctica
