= Mount Weems =

Mountain in Ellsworth Land, Antarctica

Location of Sentinel Range in Western Antarctica.

Northern Sentinel Range map.

Mount Weems (77°27′S 86°10′W) is a prominent mountain, 2,210 m, located 8 nautical miles (15 km) north of Mount Ulmer near the north end of the Sentinel Range in the Ellsworth Mountains. It is connected to Gromshin Heights to the south by Kipra Gap.

The mountain was discovered by Lincoln Ellsworth on his trans-Antarctic flight of November 23, 1935. It was named by the Advisory Committee on Antarctic Names (US-ACAN) for Captain P. V. H. Weems, a retired inventor from the U.S. Navy and a developer of air navigation instrumentation and techniques and consultant to Ellsworth on air navigation problems of this flight.
