= Mount Bentley =

Mountain in Antarctica

Location of Sentinel Range in Western Antarctica.

Sentinel Range map.

Mount Bentley (78°07′S 86°14′W) is a mountain (4,245 m) standing 2 nautical miles (3.7 km; 2.3 mi) north of Mount Anderson in the main western ridge of the Sentinel Range, Antarctica. It was discovered by the Marie Byrd Land Traverse party, 1957–58, and named for Dr. Charles R. Bentley, leader of the traverse party and chief traverse seismologist at Byrd Station, 1957–59.

== See also ==
- Mountains in Antarctica

== Maps ==
- Vinson Massif. Scale 1:250 000 topographic map. Reston, Virginia: US Geological Survey, 1988.
- Antarctic Digital Database (ADD). Scale 1:250000 topographic map of Antarctica. Scientific Committee on Antarctic Research (SCAR). Since 1993, regularly updated.
