= Mount Hale (Antarctica) =

Mountain in Ellsworth Land, Antarctica

Location of Sentinel Range in Western Antarctica.

Sentinel Range map.

Mount Hale (78°04′S 86°19′W) is a mountain (3,595 m) standing 1.5 mi NW of Mount Davis in the main ridge of the Sentinel Range, Antarctica. Discovered by the Marie Byrd Land Traverse party, 1957–58, under Charles R. Bentley, and named for Daniel P. Hale, auroral physicist at Byrd Station and member of the traverse party.

== See also ==
- Mountains in Antarctica
