= Branscomb Glacier =

Glacier in Antarctica

- Location of Vinson Massif in Western Antarctica

- Location within Antarctica
- Type: tributary
- Location: Ellsworth Land
- Coordinates: 78°32′S 86°05′W
- Length: 6 nmi (11 km; 7 mi)
- Thickness: unknown
- Terminus: Nimitz Glacier
- Status: unknown

The Branscomb Glacier (78°32′S 86°05′W) is an Antarctic glacier, 11 nautical miles (20 km; 13 mi) long, flowing west from the north-west side of Vinson Massif (the highest point in Antarctica) into Nimitz Glacier, in the Sentinel Range of the Ellsworth Mountains. Its upper course receives ice influx from both Goodge Col and Jacobsen Valley, while the tributary Roché Glacier joins Branscomb Glacier just northwest of Príncipe de Asturias Peak. Branscomb Glacier has been the focus of scientific research expeditions aimed at studying glaciology, ice dynamics, and climate change in Antarctica. Antarctic Logistics & Expeditions has a base camp on the Branscomb Glacier (Vinson Base Camp).

== History ==
The glacier was mapped by the USGS from surveys and USN aerial photographs between 1957 and 1960. It was named by US-ACAN after Lewis M. Branscomb, Chairman of the National Science Board from 1982 to 1984.

== See also ==
- List of glaciers in the Antarctic
- Glaciology

== Maps ==
- Vinson Massif. Scale 1:250 000 topographic map. Reston, Virginia: US Geological Survey, 1988.
- Antarctic Digital Database (ADD). Scale 1:250000 topographic map of Antarctica. Scientific Committee on Antarctic Research (SCAR). Since 1993, regularly updated.
- Ellsworth Mountains Series 1: Vinson Massif Scale 1:100 000 topographic map. Antarctic Logistics & Expeditions (ALE).
