= Mount Tyree =

Mountain in Ellsworth Land, Antarctica

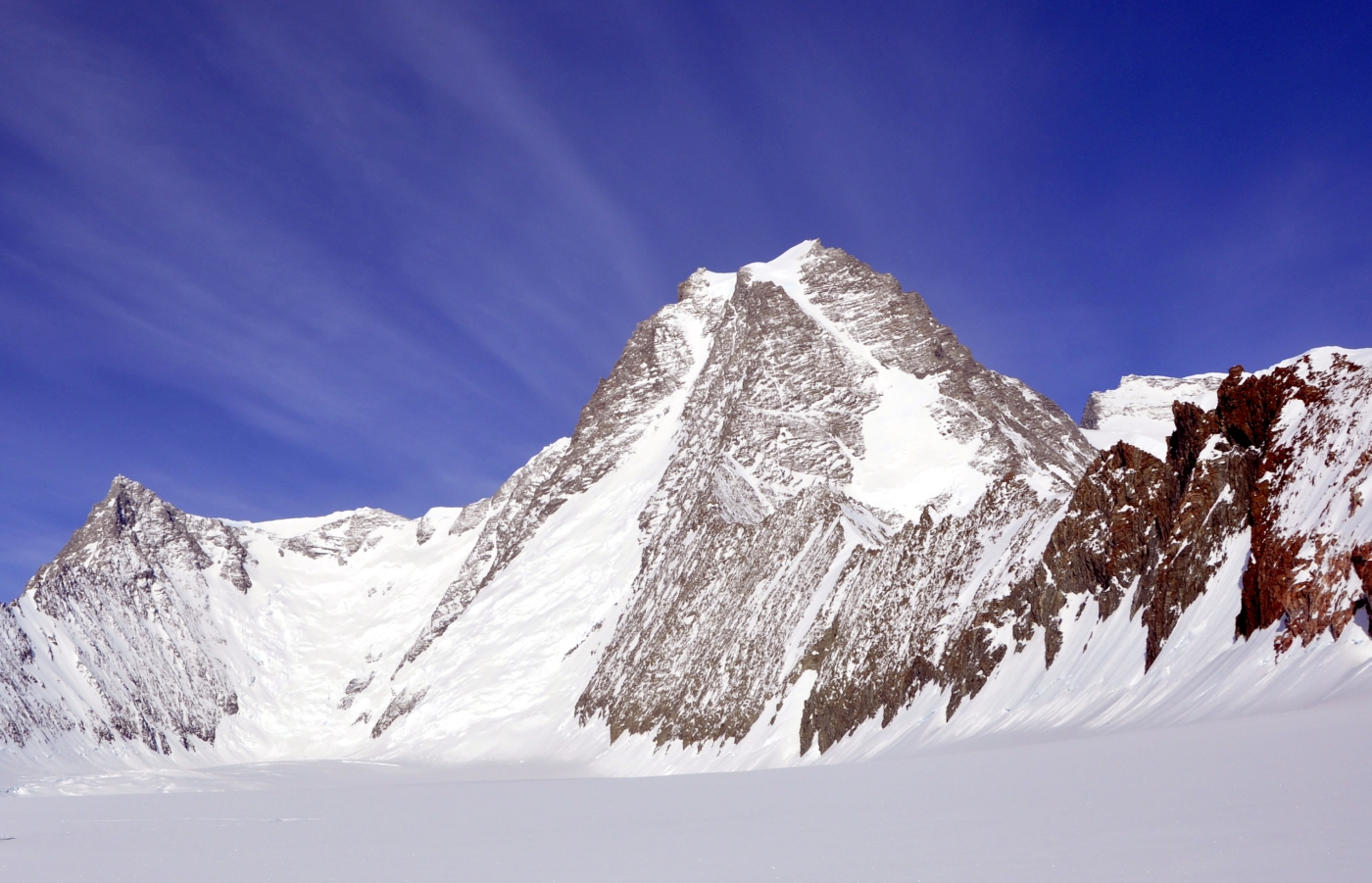
- Mount Tyree from East (Photo: Christian Stangl, 2011)

Highest point
- Elevation: 4,852 m (15,919 ft)
- Prominence: 1,152 m (3,780 ft)
- Listing: Seven Second Summits
- Coordinates: 78°24′42″S 85°51′43″W

Geography
- Location within Antarctica
- Location: Antarctica
- Parent range: Sentinel Range

Climbing
- First ascent: 1967 by Barry Corbet and John Evans, members of Nicholas Clinch's team
- Easiest route: Rock/ice climb

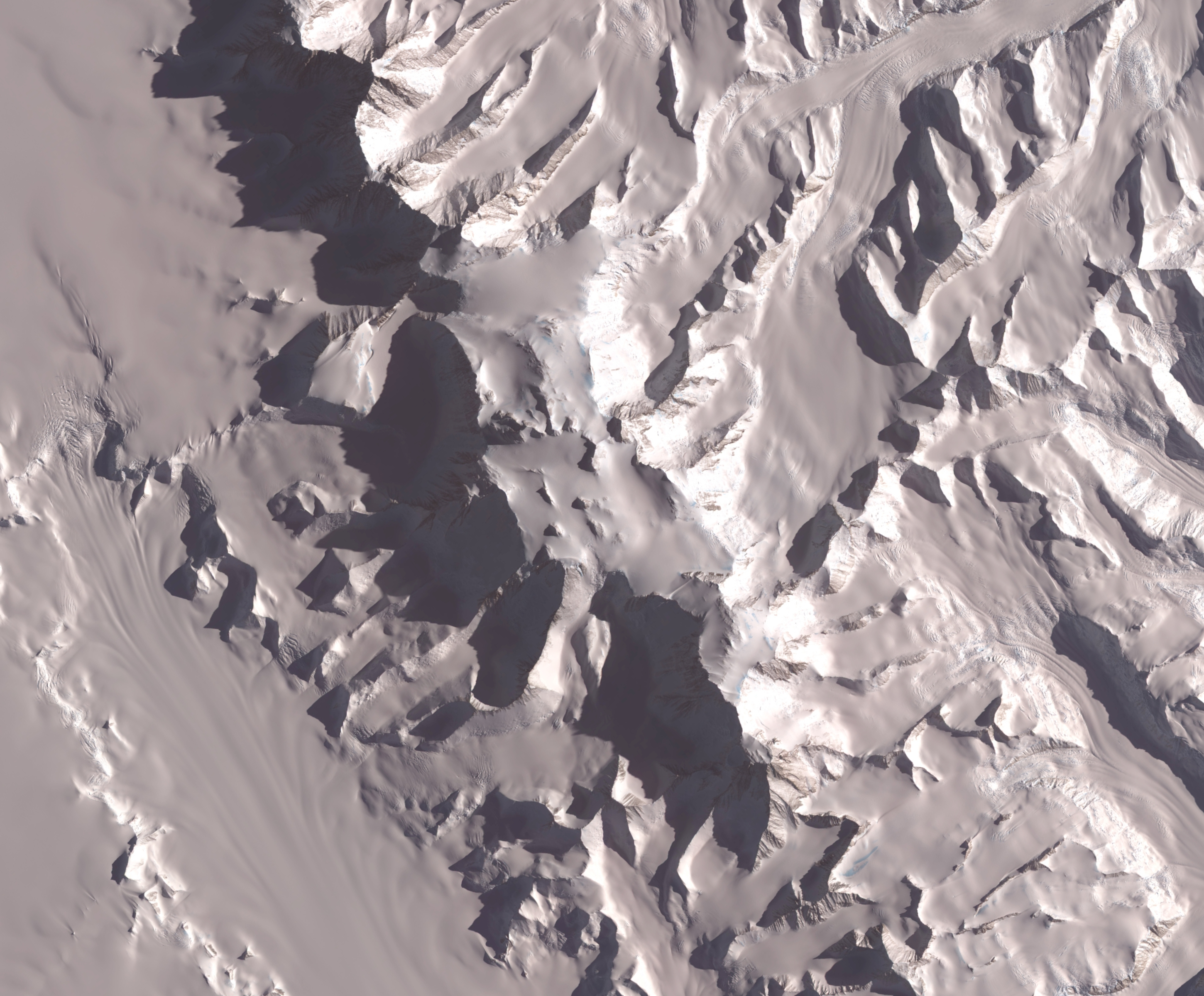
Annotated image of Vinson Massif shows location of Tyree, top left

Mount Tyree (4852m) is the second highest mountain of Antarctica located 13 kilometres northwest of Mount Vinson (4,892 m), the highest peak on the continent. It surmounts Patton Glacier to the north and Cervellati Glacier to the southeast.

== History ==
Mt. Tyree was discovered in January 1958 during reconnaissance flights by the United States Navy VX-6 squadron, and mapped later that month by the Marie Byrd Land Traverse Party. The mountain was named for Rear Admiral David M. Tyree, who was commander of the U.S. Naval Support Force in Antarctica, from April 14, 1959 to November 26, 1962.

As of 2022, the summit had only been reached on seven occasions, by a total of twenty people, via three different routes: in January 1967 by John Evans and Barry Corbet (of Corbet's Couloir); in January 1989 by Terry ‘Mugs’ Stump; in 1997 by French alpinists Antoine de Choudens and Antoine Cayrol; and later in 1997 by Conrad Anker and Alex Lowe. On January 3, 2012 Hans Kammerlander, Robert Miller and Christian Stangl repeated the French route to make the fifth ascent. Out of fifteen mountaineers who successfully climbed Mt Tyree, three died in unrelated mountaineering accidents within four years of their respective ascents. The still-unclimbed south face is 2,000 metres (6,600 ft) high and one of the largest walls in Antarctica.

On January 16, 2017, five climbers made the sixth ascent of Mt. Tyree by the Grand Couloir (French route). The Tyree 50/50 expedition included Richard Thurmer, Jr, Victor Saunders, Maria "Pachi" Paz Ibarra, Seth Timpano and Todd Tumolo. Richard Thurmer is the first amateur climber and second oldest man (age 61) to make the summit. Victor Saunders is the oldest man to summit Mt. Tyree (age 66). Maria "Pachi" Paz Ibarra is the first woman to reach the summit. The Tyree 50/50 expedition of January 2017 was the 50th anniversary of the first summit in January 1967 and the team increased the number of climbers on the summit by 50%.

On January 1, 2022, Jennifer Drummond became the second woman to summit the mountain. Jennifer's team members were Sebastian Grau-Kunhardt, Todd Passey, Sam Hennessey and Rob Smith.

The climbing season is November to January, when the sun is above the horizon 24 hours a day and the air is warmest—up to −30 °C (−20 °F) near the summit. Like the nearby Mount Vinson, the mountain may be accessed by means of a 6-hour flight from Punta Arenas, Chile, to Union Glacier Camp followed by a 200 km flight on a ski plane to the base of the mountain.

== Ascents ==
Complete ascent list of Mt. Tyree (2022)
Number	Year	Climber
1	1967	Barry Corbet; John Evans
2	1985	Mugs Stump
3	1997	Antoine Chayrol; Antoine de Choudens
4	1997	Conrad Anker; Alex Lowe
5	2012	Hans Kammerlander; Robert Miller; Christian Stangl
6	2017	Richard Thurmer, Jr; Victor Saunders; Seth Timpano; Maria "Pachi" Paz Ibarra; Todd Tumolo
7	2022	Jennifer Drummond; Sam Hennessey; Sebastian Grau Kunhardt; Todd Passey; Rob Smith

== Maps ==
Sentinel Range map.

- Vinson Massif. Scale 1:250 000 topographic map. Reston, Virginia: US Geological Survey, 1988.
- D. Gildea and C. Rada. Vinson Massif and the Sentinel Range. Scale 1:50 000 topographic map. Omega Foundation, 2007.
- Antarctic Digital Database (ADD). Scale 1:250000 topographic map of Antarctica. Scientific Committee on Antarctic Research (SCAR). Since 1993, regularly updated.

== See also ==
- Ellsworth Mountains
- Seven Second Summits
