= Patton Glacier =

Glacier in Antarctica

- Location of Sentinel Range in Western Antarctica

- Location within Antarctica
- Type: tributary
- Location: Ellsworth Land
- Coordinates: 78°16′00″S 85°25′00″W
- Thickness: unknown
- Terminus: Ellen Glacier
- Status: unknown

Central and southern Sentinel Range map

Patton Glacier (78°16′S 85°25′W) is a broad tributary glacier in the Sentinel Range, Ellsworth Mountains. It drains the east slope of the main ridge between Mounts Ostenso and Tyree, flows east-northeastwards between Evans Peak and Versinikia Peak on the north and Mount Bearskin on the south, and enters Ellen Glacier northeast of Zalmoxis Peak and southeast of Mount Jumper.

The feature was first mapped by the United States Geological Survey (USGS) from surveys and U.S. Navy air photos, 1957–59. It was named by Advisory Committee on Antarctic Names (US-ACAN) for Sgt. Richard J. Patton, United States Air Force (USAF), the first to parachute land at the South Pole, November 26, 1956. He gave valuable assistance on the ground in directing the air drops from Globemaster aircraft, used in transporting supplies to establish the South Pole Station.

== See also ==
- List of glaciers in the Antarctic
- Glaciology

== Maps ==
- Vinson Massif. Scale 1:250 000 topographic map. Reston, Virginia: US Geological Survey, 1988.
- D. Gildea and C. Rada. Vinson Massif and the Sentinel Range. Scale 1:50 000 topographic map. Omega Foundation, 2007.
- Antarctic Digital Database (ADD). Scale 1:250000 topographic map of Antarctica. Scientific Committee on Antarctic Research (SCAR). Since 1993, regularly updated.), 1993–2016.
