= Lincoln Ellsworth =

Early 20th-century American explorer of Antarctica

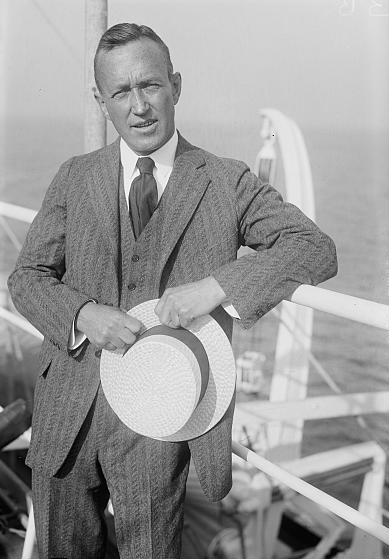
- Born: Linn Ellsworth; May 12, 1880; Chicago, Illinois, U.S.
- Died: May 26, 1951 (aged 71); New York City, U.S.
- Occupation: Exploration
- Father: James Ellsworth

Lincoln Ellsworth (May 12, 1880 – May 26, 1951) was an American polar explorer, engineer, surveyor, and writer. He led the first Arctic and Antarctic air crossings.

== Early life ==
Linn Ellsworth was born in Chicago, Illinois on May 12, 1880. His parents were Eva Frances (née Butler) and James Ellsworth, a wealthy coal mine owner and financier. He was named Linn after his uncle William Linn, but changed his name to Lincoln when he was a child.

His mother died in 1888. Ellsworth and his sister moved to Hudson, Ohio, to live with his grandmother. He attended the Western Reserve Academy in Hudson and The Hill School in Pottstown, Pennsylvania. He took two years longer than usual to graduate, before entering the Sheffield Scientific School at Yale University. His academic performance was poor, and he subsequently enrolled at Columbia University School of Mines and studied civil engineering. He joined the fraternity of Delta Psi (St. Anthony Hall) at Yale in 1900 and Columbia in 1901.

After dropping out of college in 1903, Ellsworth climbed the Andes with a fraternity brother.

== Career ==
Ellsworth was a surveyor and engineer with a team conducting the first Canadian Grand Pacific Railroad survey from 1902 to 1907. He worked the winter of 1904 in his father's coal mine. In 1905, he worked as an assistant engineer of a gold mine in Teller Alska. In 1906, he returned to his father's coal mine, working as an engineer. He then worked as an engineer in Alaska and Canada from 1907 to 1924, including spending three years with the United States Biological Survey, gold prospecting along the Peace River, and working on a railroad over the Rocky Mountains in Alaska.

During World War I, he served in the United States Army and trained as an aviator. Elsworth led the trans-Andean topographic survey from the Amazon River basin to the Pacific Ocean in Peru for Johns Hopkins University in 1924.

Ellsworth's father funded US$100,000 ($1.84 million in 2025) to Roald Amundsen's 1925 attempt to fly from Svalbard to the North Pole. Amundsen, accompanied by Lincoln Ellsworth, pilot Hjalmar Riiser-Larsen, flight mechanic Karl Feucht, and two other team members, set out in two Dornier Wal flying boats, the N24 and N25, in an attempted to reach the North Pole on May 21. When one airplane lost power, both made forced landings and, as a result, became separated. It took three days for the crews to regroup and seven takeoff attempts before they could return N25 to the air 28 days later. Ellsworth senior died in Italy on June 2, 1925, while waiting for news of his lost son.

In early March 1926, under the headline "Across the Pole by Dirigible", The New York Times announced the Amundsen-Ellsworth Expedition. A long article in the same edition (by Fitzhugh Green, one of Byrd's navy colleagues) was headed "Massed Attack On Polar Region Begins Soon." Ellsworth accompanied Amundsen on his second effort to fly over the Pole in the airship Norge, designed and piloted by the Italian engineer Umberto Nobile, in a flight from Svalbard to Alaska. On May 12, the Geographic North Pole was sighted.

Ellsworth made four expeditions to Antarctica between 1933 and 1939 using as his aircraft transporter and base, a former Norwegian herring boat that he named Wyatt Earp after his hero. The aircraft, named Polar Star, was a Northrop Gamma outfitted with skis.

On November 23, 1935, Ellsworth discovered the Ellsworth Mountains of Antarctica when he made a trans-Antarctic flight from Dundee Island to the Ross Ice Shelf. He gave the descriptive name Sentinel Range, which was later named for the northern half of the Ellsworth Mountains. During the flight, his aircraft ran out of fuel, forcing a landing near the Little America camp established by Richard Byrd. Because of a faulty radio, he and his pilot, Herbert Hollick-Kenyon, were unable to notify authorities about the landing. The two men were declared missing, and the British research ship Discovery steamed out from Melbourne, Australia to search for them. The two men were discovered on January 16, 1936, after almost two months alone at Little America. They returned to New York City on April 6, and their support ship Wyatt Earp arrived separately two weeks later.

== Honors ==
Ellsworth received honorary degrees from Yale University and Kenyon College. In 1927, the Boy Scouts of America made Lincoln Ellsworth an Honorary Scout, a new category of Scout created that same year. This distinction was given to "American citizens whose achievements in outdoor activity, exploration, and worthwhile adventure are of such an exceptional character as to capture the imagination of boys..." The Boy Scout's Book of True Adventure, Fourteen Honorary Scouts, includes an essay "The First Crossing of the Polar Sea" by Lincoln Ellsworth.

In 1928, Ellsworth was awarded a Congressional Gold Medal that honored both his 1925 and 1926 polar flights. He received the Hubbard Gold Medal from the National Geographic Society in 1936 for his Antarctic expedition and aerial survey. He received a second Congressional Gold Medal in 1936 for "his claims on behalf of the United States of approximately 350,000 square miles in Antarctica and for his 2,500-mile aerial survey of the heart of Antarctica." In 1937, he was awarded the Patron's Medal of the Royal Geographical Society for his improvements in the technique of polar aerial navigation.

The American Museum of Natural History created the Lincoln Ellsworth exhibit about his Arctic and Antarctic voyages in 1933; it remains open to the public as of 2024. The former Antarctic base Ellsworth Station was named after him. Ellsworth Land, Mount Ellsworth, and Lake Ellsworth, all in Antarctica, are all named for Lincoln Ellsworth. The United States Postal Service issued a commemorative stamp in his honor in 1988. In 1919, the high school athletic teams of Hudson High School in Hudson, Ohio, were nicknamed "The Explorers" after Ellsworth. Hudson's Ellsworth Hill Elementary is also named after him.

== Personal life ==
On May 23, 1933, Ellsworth married naturalist and historian Mary Louise Ulmer of Philadelphia, Pennsylvania. The couple met while taking flying lessons in Switzerland. They had no children. They lived at 35 East 76th Street in New York City and in the Schloss Lenzburg castle in Switzerland, bequeathed to Ellsworth by his father.

He was a trustee of the American Museum of Natural History and was also a major benefactor of the museum. He also served on the board of trustees of Western Reserve Academy from 1926 to 1951.

Ellsworth died of heart failure at his home in New York City on May 26, 1951, at the age of 71. He was buried in Hudson, Ohio.

== Publications ==
=== Books ===
- Our Polar Flight, with Roald Amundsen. New York: Dodd, Mead and Company, 1925.
- First Crossing of the Polar Sea, with Roald Amundsen. New York: Doubleday, Doran and Company, 1925.
- D'Europe en Amérique par le Pôle Nord: Voyage du Dirigeable "Norge", with Roald Amundsen. Paris: Albin Michel, 1927.
- Search. New York; Brewer, Warren & Putnam, 1932.
- Exploring Today. New York City: Dodd, Mead & Company, 1935.
- Beyond Horizons: The Autobiography of the Great Polar Explorer. Garden City: Doubleday, 1938.

=== Magazine articles ===
- "My Flight Across Antarctica" National Geographic, vol. 70, no. 1 (1936)
- "The First Crossing of Antarctica". Royal Geographic Society, vol. 89, no. 3 (January 1937).
- "My Four Antarctic Expeditions, Explorations of 1933-39 Have Stricken Vast Areas from the Realm of the Unknown". National Geographic, vol. 76, no. 1 (July 1939).

== See also ==
- List of people on stamps of the United States
- List of polar explorers
