= Charles R. Bentley =

American glaciologist and geophysicist

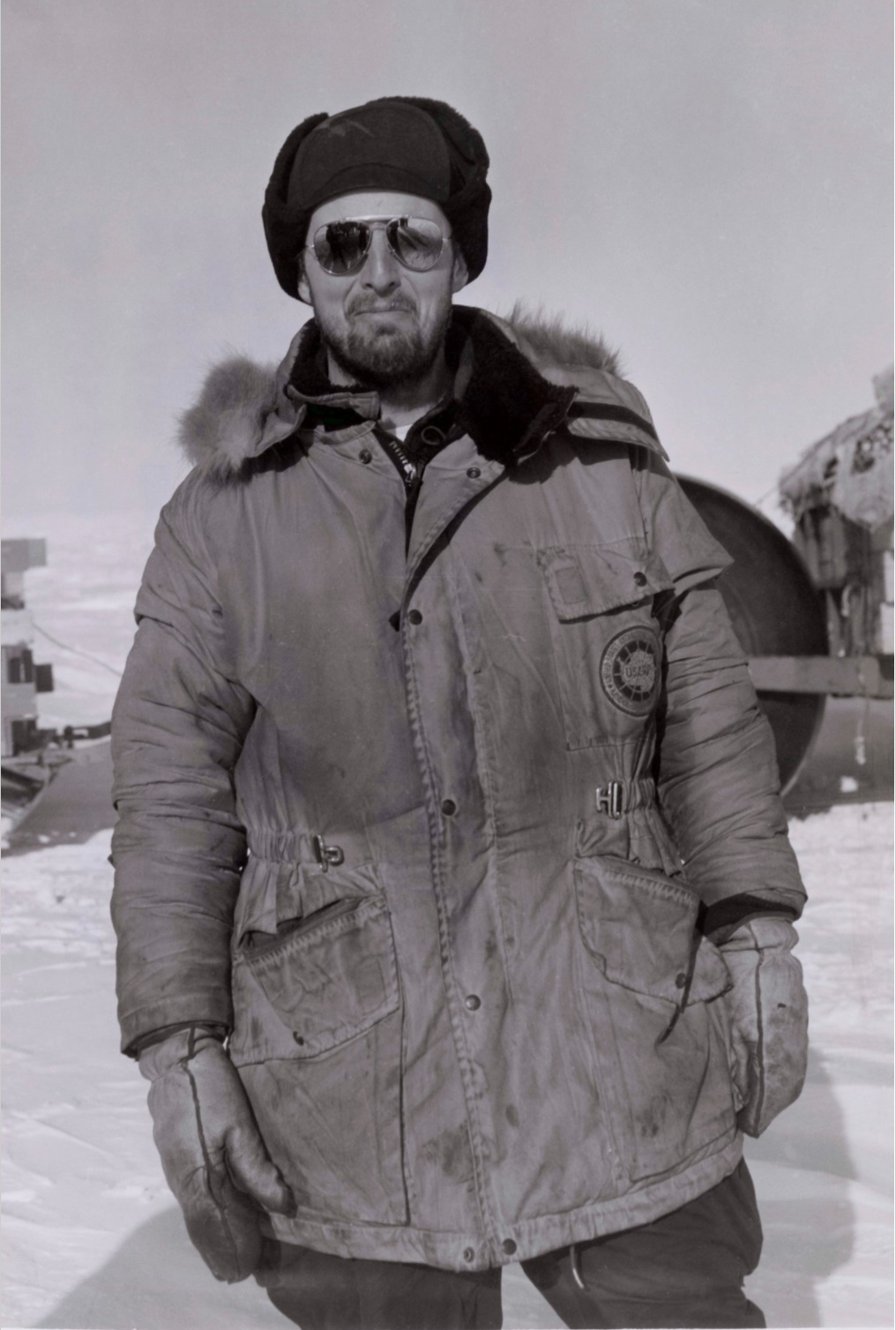
Bentley in Antarctica in 1964

Charles Raymond Bentley (December 23, 1929 – August 19, 2017) was an American glaciologist and geophysicist, born in Rochester, New York. He was a professor emeritus at the University of Wisconsin–Madison. Mount Bentley and the Bentley Subglacial Trench in Antarctica are named after him. In 1957, he and a handful of other scientists including Mario Giovinetto set out on an expedition across West Antarctica in tracked vehicles to make the first measurements of the ice sheet. According to the Geophysical Institute, it was discovered that the snow and ice that covered the continent traveled 2 miles down to the bedrock of the continent. Bentleu would test this by dropping explosives down holes drilled into the ice and waiting to receive seismic signals from the explosives.

He was awarded the Seligman Crystal by the International Glaciological Society in 1990. He died on August 19, 2017, at the age of 87 in Oakland, California.
