= Ponor Saddle =

Geographical feature of Antarctica

Location of Sentinel Range in Western Antarctica.

Sentinel Range map.

Ponor Saddle (Bulgarian: седловина Понор, ‘Sedlovina Ponor’ \se-dlo-vi-'na po-'nor\) is the 1.6 km long ice-covered flat saddle of elevation 2340 m linking Mount Allen and Mount Liptak in southern Sentinel Range, Ellsworth Mountains of Antarctica. It is part of the glacial divide between Bolgrad Glacier and Kornicker Glacier.

The feature is named after the settlement of Ponor in western Bulgaria.

== Location ==
The midpoint of Ponor Saddle is located at 78°43′00″S 84°58′00″W, which is 1.44 km north of Mount Liptak, 4 km east-southeast of Krusha Peak, and 2.38 km south-southeast of Mount Allen, according to US mapping in 1988.

== Maps ==
- Vinson Massif. Scale 1:250000 topographic map. Reston, Virginia: US Geological Survey, 1988.
