= Stolnik Peak =

Mountain in Antarctica

Location of Sentinel Range in Western Antarctica.

Sentinel Range map.

Stolnik Peak (Bulgarian: връх Столник, romanized: vrah Stolnik, IPA: [ˈvrɤx ˈstɔɫnik]) is the peak rising to 2624 m in the east foothills of Craddock Massif in Sentinel Range, Ellsworth Mountains in Antarctica. Situated on the side ridge running eastwards from Mount Craddock. The peak is overlooking Sowers Glacier to the northwest and Saltzman Glacier to the south.

The peak is named after the settlement of Stolnik in Western Bulgaria.

== Location ==
Stolnik Peak is located at 78°36′52″S 84°57′05″W, which is 1.86 km east of Sanchez Peak, 4.24 km south-southeast of Elfring Peak and 1.97 km west of Mount Osborne. US mapping in 1961, updated in 1988.

== Maps ==
- Vinson Massif. Scale 1:250 000 topographic map. Reston, Virginia: US Geological Survey, 1988.
- Antarctic Digital Database (ADD). Scale 1:250000 topographic map of Antarctica. Scientific Committee on Antarctic Research (SCAR). Since 1993, regularly updated.
