= Arsela Peak =

Mountain in Antarctica

Location of Sentinel Range in Western Antarctica.

Map of Sentinel Range.

Arsela Peak (Bulgarian: връх Арсела, romanized: vrah Arsela, IPA: [ˈvrɤx ɐrˈsɛɫɐ]) is the peak rising to 1517 m near the south end of Owen Ridge, the southernmost portion of the main ridge of Sentinel Range in Ellsworth Mountains, Antarctica. It has precipitous and partly ice-free north and southwest slopes, and surmounts lower Nimitz Glacier to the southwest and the end of Wessbecher Glacier to the northeast.

The peak is named after the Thracian settlement of Arsela in Southern Bulgaria.

== Location ==
Arsela Peak is located at 78°56′29.6″S 84°35′19″W, which is 11 km southeast of Lishness Peak, 14.9 km west-southwest of Mountainview Ridge in Petvar Heights, 4 km north-northwest of Bowers Corner, and 12.1 km northeast of O'Neal Nunataks in Bastien Range. US mapping in 1961 and 1988.

== See also ==
- Mountains in Antarctica

== Maps ==
- Vinson Massif. Scale 1:250 000 topographic map. Reston, Virginia: US Geological Survey, 1988.
- Antarctic Digital Database (ADD). Scale 1:250000 topographic map of Antarctica. Scientific Committee on Antarctic Research (SCAR). Since 1993, regularly updated.
