= Kasilag Pass =

Elevation in Antarctica

Location of Sentinel Range in Western Antarctica.

Sentinel Range map.

Kasilag Pass (Bulgarian: Касилашки проход, ‘Kasilashki Prohod’ \'ka-si-lash-ki 'pro-hod\) is an ice-covered saddle of elevation 2,231 metres (7,320 ft) in the Ellsworth Mountains of Antarctica. It is situated west of Mount Mullen, separates Petvar Heights to the east from Owen Ridge, the southernmost portion of the main crest of Sentinel Range to the west, and is part of the glacial divide between Kornicker Glacier to the north and Wessbecher Glacier to the south.

The feature is named after the settlement of Kasilag in Western Bulgaria.

== Location ==
Kasilag Pass is centred at 78°46′56″S 84°48′47″W, 2.44 kilometres (1.52 mi) northeast of Mount Inderbitzen and 2.13 kilometres (1.32 mi) southeast of Mount Milton (U.S. mapping in 1961, updated in 1988).

== Maps ==
- Vinson Massif. Scale 1:250 000 topographic map. Reston, Virginia: US Geological Survey, 1988.
