= Stikal Peak =

Mountain in Antarctica

Location of Sentinel Range in Western Antarctica.

Map of Sentinel Range.

Stikal Peak (Bulgarian: връх Стикъл, romanized: vrah Stikal, IPA: [ˈvrɤx ˈstikɐɫ]) is a rocky peak that is 1835 m in Owen Ridge, the southernmost portion of Sentinel Range in Ellsworth Mountains, Antarctica. It surmounts lower Nimitz Glacier to the southwest and Wessbecher Glacier to the northeast.

The peak is named after the settlement of Stikal in Southern Bulgaria.

== Location ==
Stikal Peak is located at 78°52′23.1″S 84°46′57″W, which is 2.3 km southeast of Lishness Peak, 5.4 km southwest of Marze Peak in Petvar Heights, 8.7 km northwest of Arsela Peak, and 21.83 km east by south of Bergison Peak in Bastien Range. US mapping in 1961 and 1988.

== Maps ==
- Vinson Massif. Scale 1:250 000 topographic map. Reston, Virginia: US Geological Survey, 1988.
- Antarctic Digital Database (ADD). Scale 1:250000 topographic map of Antarctica. Scientific Committee on Antarctic Research (SCAR). Since 1993, regularly updated.
