= Peristera Peak =

Mountain in Ellsworth Land, Antarctica

Location of Sentinel Range in Western Antarctica.

Map of Sentinel Range.

Peristera Peak (Bulgarian: връх Перистера, romanized: vrah Peristera, IPA: [ˈvrɤx pɛriˈstɛrɐ]) is the rocky peak rising to 2142 m in Owen Ridge, the southernmost portion of the main ridge of Sentinel Range in Ellsworth Mountains, Antarctica. It overlooks lower Nimitz Glacier to the southwest and upper Wessbecher Glacier to the northeast.

The peak is named after the ancient and medieval fortress of Peristera in Southern Bulgaria.

== Location ==
Peristera Peak is located at 78°49′39.5″S 84°49′20″W, which is 3.67 km south-southeast of Mount Inderbitzen, 3.9 km west by north of Marze Peak in Petvar Heights, 3.1 km north of Lishness Peak, and 21.1 km east-northeast of Bergison Peak in Bastien Range. US mapping in 1961 and 1988.

== See also ==
- Mountains in Antarctica

== Maps ==
- Vinson Massif. Scale 1:250 000 topographic map. Reston, Virginia: US Geological Survey, 1988.
- Antarctic Digital Database (ADD). Scale 1:250000 topographic map of Antarctica. Scientific Committee on Antarctic Research (SCAR). Since 1993, regularly updated.
