= Hodges Knoll =

Location of Sentinel Range in Western Antarctica.

Map of Sentinel Range.

Hodges Knoll (Bulgarian: могила Ходжис, ‘Mogila Hodges’ \mo-'gi-la 'ho-dzhis\) is the mostly ice-covered hill extending 2.2 km in northeast–southwest direction, 1 km wide and rising to 2250 m on the southwest side of Vinson Massif in Sentinel Range, Ellsworth Mountains in Antarctica. It surmounts upper Nimitz Glacier to the southwest and its tributaries Tulaczyk Glacier to the north and Zapol Glacier to the east.

The peak is named after the British artist William Hodges (1744–1797), a member of James Cook’s 1772-75 exploration voyage who, along with Joseph Gilbert, produced the first paintings from the Antarctic region.

== Location ==
Hodges Knoll is located at 78°35′41″S 85°57′15″W, which is 3.12 km southeast of Klenova Peak, 2.92 km south-southwest of Brichebor Peak, 8.54 km southwest of Silverstein Peak, 7.45 km west of Mount Slaughter, and 10.32 km northeast of Mount Klayn in Bastien Range. US mapping in 1961 and 1988.

== Maps ==
- Vinson Massif. Scale 1:250 000 topographic map. Reston, Virginia: US Geological Survey, 1988.
- Antarctic Digital Database (ADD). Scale 1:250000 topographic map of Antarctica. Scientific Committee on Antarctic Research (SCAR). Since 1993, regularly updated.
