= Gilbert Spur =

Geological feature in Antarctica

Location of Sentinel Range in Western Antarctica

Map of Sentinel Range

Gilbert Spur (Bulgarian: рид Гилбърт, ‘Rid Gilbert’ \'rid 'gil-b&rt\) is the mostly ice-covered ridge extending 3.9 km in north–south direction, 2.3 km wide and rising to 1791 m at the confluence of Bender Glacier and Nimitz Glacier, in the southern part of Sentinel Range in Ellsworth Mountains, Antarctica.

The peak is named after Joseph Gilbert (1732-1821), Master of HMS Resolution during the 1772-75 exploration voyage of James Cook, who, along with William Hodges, produced the first paintings from the Antarctic region.

== Location ==
Gilbert Spur is located at 78°43′08″S 85°25′57″W, which is 2.1 km south of Chaplin Peak, 8.5 km southwest of Mount Strybing, 10.5 km west of Mount Liptak, and 11.7 km east by north of Mount Fisek in Bastien Range. US mapping in 1961 and 1988.

== Maps ==
- Vinson Massif. Scale 1:250 000 topographic map. Reston, Virginia: US Geological Survey, 1988.
- Antarctic Digital Database (ADD). Scale 1:250000 topographic map of Antarctica. Scientific Committee on Antarctic Research (SCAR). Since 1993, regularly updated.
