= Modren Peak =

Mountain in Ellsworth Land, Antarctica

Location of Sentinel Range in Western Antarctica.

Map of Sentinel Range.

Modren Peak (Bulgarian: връх Модрен, romanized: vrah Modren, IPA: [ˈvrɤx ˈmɔdrɛn]) is the peak rising to 1748 m in Owen Ridge, the southernmost portion of the main ridge of Sentinel Range in Ellsworth Mountains, Antarctica. It has steep and partly ice-free north and southwest slopes, and surmounts lower Nimitz Glacier to the west.

The peak is named after the historical settlement of Modren in Southern Bulgaria.

== Location ==
Modren Peak is located at 78°48′55.8″S 85°03′40″W, which is 4.3 km southwest of Mount Inderbitzen, 5.35 km west-northwest of Peristera Peak, and 16.34 km east-northeast of Bergison Peak in Bastien Range. US mapping in 1961 and 1988.

== See also ==
- Mountains in Antarctica

== Maps ==
- Vinson Massif. Scale 1:250 000 topographic map. Reston, Virginia: US Geological Survey, 1988.
- Antarctic Digital Database (ADD). Scale 1:250000 topographic map of Antarctica. Scientific Committee on Antarctic Research (SCAR). Since 1993, regularly updated.
