= Klenova Peak =

Mountain in Antarctica

Location of Sentinel Range in Western Antarctica.

Map of Sentinel Range.

Klenova Peak (Bulgarian: връх Кльонова, romanized: vrah Klenova, IPA: [ˈvrɤx ˈkʎɔnovɐ]) is the sharp peak rising to 2300 m on the southwest side of Vinson Massif in Sentinel Range, Ellsworth Mountains in Antarctica. It has partly ice-free south slopes, and surmounts upper Nimitz Glacier to the southwest and its tributary Cairns Glacier to the northeast.

The peak is named after Maria Klenova (1898-1976), a Russian marine geologist who took part in the First Soviet Antarctic Expedition in 1955–57, becoming the first woman scientist to have carried out research in Antarctica.

== Location ==
Klenova Peak is located at 78°34′55.2″S 86°04′48″W, which is 12.05 km southwest of Mount Vinson, 3.85 km west-southwest of Brichebor Peak, 3.12 km northwest of Hodges Knoll, 6.63 km northeast of Ichev Nunatak, and 13.96 km southeast of Ereta Peak in Bastien Range. US mapping in 1961 and 1988.

== See also ==
- Mountains in Antarctica

== Maps ==
- Vinson Massif. Scale 1:250 000 topographic map. Reston, Virginia: US Geological Survey, 1988.
- Antarctic Digital Database (ADD). Scale 1:250000 topographic map of Antarctica. Scientific Committee on Antarctic Research (SCAR). Since 1993, regularly updated.
