= Sowers Glacier =

Glacier in Antarctica

- Location of Sentinel Range in Western Antarctica

- Location within Antarctica
- Type: tributary
- Location: Ellsworth Land
- Coordinates: 78°37′00″S 84°59′00″W
- Thickness: unknown
- Terminus: Thomas Glacier
- Status: unknown

Central and southern Sentinel Range map

Sowers Glacier (78°37′S 84°59′W) is a glacier that flows from the prominent cirque on the east side of Craddock Massif and continues between Willis Ridge on the north, and Sanchez Peak and Stolnik Peak on the south, to join Thomas Glacier north of Mount Osborne, in the Sentinel Range, Ellsworth Mountains in Antarctica.

The glacier was named by the Advisory Committee on Antarctic Names (US-ACAN) in 2006 after Todd A. Sowers, Environment Institute, Department of Geosciences, Pennsylvania State University; United States Antarctic Program (USAP) investigator of climate change and abrupt climate change, using isotopes and atmospheric gases, including greenhouse gases, from the ice core record, 1991–2006.

== See also ==
- List of glaciers in the Antarctic
- Glaciology

== Maps ==
- Vinson Massif. Scale 1:250 000 topographic map. Reston, Virginia: US Geological Survey, 1988.
- Antarctic Digital Database (ADD). Scale 1:250000 topographic map of Antarctica. Scientific Committee on Antarctic Research (SCAR). Since 1993, regularly updated.
