= Bender Glacier =

Glacier in Antarctica

- Location of Sentinel Range in Western Antarctica

- Location within Antarctica
- Type: tributary
- Location: Ellsworth Land
- Coordinates: 78°43′S 88°20′W
- Length: 4 nmi (7 km; 5 mi)
- Thickness: unknown
- Terminus: Nimitz Glacier
- Status: unknown

Sentinel Range map.

Bender Glacier (78°43′S 85°20′W) is a glacier that flows from Mount Atkinson and Mount Craddock southwards between Chaplin Peak and Krusha Peak, and joins Nimitz Glacier just south of Gilbert Spur in the southern Sentinel Range, Ellsworth Mountains in Antarctica. Receiving ice influx from its left tributaries Severinghaus Glacier, Brook Glacier and Bolgrad Glacier.

It was named by the Advisory Committee on Antarctic Names (2006) after Professor Michael L. Bender at the Department of Geosciences (Geochemistry), Princeton University (earlier at the Graduate School of Oceanography, University of Rhode Island), whose paleoclimate research from 1984 centered on the glacial-interglacial climate change and the global carbon cycle.

== Tributary glaciers ==
- Severinghaus Glacier
- Brook Glacier
- Bolgrad Glacier

== See also ==
- List of glaciers in the Antarctic
- Glaciology

== Maps ==
- Vinson Massif. Scale 1:250 000 topographic map. Reston, Virginia: US Geological Survey, 1988.
- Antarctic Digital Database (ADD). Scale 1:250000 topographic map of Antarctica. Scientific Committee on Antarctic Research (SCAR). Since 1993, regularly updated.
