= Krusha Peak =

Mountain in Antarctica

Location of Sentinel Range in Western Antarctica.

Sentinel Range map.

Krusha Peak (Bulgarian: връх Круша, romanized: vrah Krusha, IPA: [ˈvrɤx ˈkruʃɐ]) is the peak rising to 2800 m in Owen Ridge, southern Sentinel Range in Ellsworth Mountains, Antarctica, surmounting Bolgrad Glacier to the southeast and Brook Glacier to the northwest.

The peak is named after the Bulgarian educator Zahariy Krusha (1808-1881).

== Location ==
Krusha Peak is located at 78°42′23″S 85°08′33″W, which is 6.94 km east of Chaplin Peak (1978 m), 3.87 km south of Mount Strybing (3200 m), 2.88 km west-southwest of Mount Allen (3430 m) and 4.83 km northwest of Mount Liptak (3100 m). US mapping in 1961, updated in 1988.

== See also ==
- Mountains in Antarctica

== Maps ==
- Vinson Massif. Scale 1:250 000 topographic map. Reston, Virginia: US Geological Survey, 1988.
- Antarctic Digital Database (ADD). Scale 1:250000 topographic map of Antarctica. Scientific Committee on Antarctic Research (SCAR). Since 1993, regularly updated.
