= Severinghaus Glacier =

Glacier in Antarctica

- Location of Sentinel Range in Western Antarctica

- Location within Antarctica
- Type: tributary
- Location: Ellsworth Land
- Coordinates: 78°40′00″S 85°15′00″W
- Thickness: unknown
- Terminus: Bender Glacier
- Status: unknown

Sentinel Range map.

Severinghaus Glacier (78°40′S 85°15′W) is a glacier flowing southwestward from Karnare Col along the north side of Mount Strybing and the south side of Mount Craddock into Bender Glacier in southern Sentinel Range, Ellsworth Mountains in Antarctica. Named by the US-ACAN (2006) after Jeffrey P. Severinghaus, University of Rhode Island Graduate School of Oceanography; USAP researcher from 1996 on the history of the atmosphere, including greenhouse gases, and history of climate changes, using the ice core record.

== See also ==
- List of glaciers in the Antarctic
- Glaciology

== Maps ==
- Vinson Massif. Scale 1:250 000 topographic map. Reston, Virginia: US Geological Survey, 1988.
- Antarctic Digital Database (ADD). Scale 1:250000 topographic map of Antarctica. Scientific Committee on Antarctic Research (SCAR). Since 1993, regularly updated.
