= Sirma Glacier =

Glacier in Antarctica

- Location of Sentinel Range in Western Antarctica

- Location within Antarctica
- Type: tributary
- Location: Ellsworth Land
- Coordinates: 78°47′00″S 85°04′40″W
- Length: 4 nautical miles (7.4 km; 4.6 mi)
- Width: 2 nautical miles (3.7 km; 2.3 mi)
- Thickness: unknown
- Terminus: Nimitz Glacier
- Status: unknown

Sentinel Range map

Sirma Glacier (Bulgarian: ледник Сирма, romanized: lednik Sirma, IPA: [ˈlɛdnik ˈsirmɐ]) is the 4 nautical miles (7.4 km; 4.6 mi) long and 2 nautical miles (3.7 km; 2.3 mi) wide glacier on the west side of Owen Ridge in southern Sentinel Range, Ellsworth Mountains in Antarctica, situated south of Bolgrad Glacier, and flowing west-southwestwards from Mount Southwick, Mount Milton and Mount Inderbitzen to leave the range and join Nimitz Glacier northwest of Modren Peak.

The glacier is named after the Bulgarian woman rebel leader Sirma Voyvoda (1773-1858).

== Location ==
Sirma Glacier is centred at 78°47′00″S 85°04′40″W. US mapping in 1961, updated in 1988.

== See also ==
- List of glaciers in the Antarctic
- Glaciology

== Maps ==
- Vinson Massif. Scale 1:250 000 topographic map. Reston, Virginia: US Geological Survey, 1988.
- Antarctic Digital Database (ADD). Scale 1:250000 topographic map of Antarctica. Scientific Committee on Antarctic Research (SCAR). Since 1993, regularly updated.
