= Giles Glacier =

Glacier in Antarctica

- Location of Sentinel Range in Western Antarctica

- Location within Antarctica
- Type: hanging glacier
- Location: Ellsworth Land
- Coordinates: 78°40′00″S 84°46′00″W
- Thickness: unknown
- Terminus: Thomas Glacier
- Status: unknown

Giles Glacier (78°40′00″S 84°46′00″W) is a hanging glacier that flows eastward along the south side of Moyher Ridge to Thomas Glacier in the south Sentinel Range in the Ellsworth Mountains. It was named by the Advisory Committee on Antarctic Names in 2006 after J. David Giles of the Polar Ice Coring Office at the University of Nebraska–Lincoln, who supported United States Antarctic Program drilling operations at Taylor Dome, the South Pole, Windless Bight, Siple Dome and Kamb Ice Stream, from 1993 to 1998.

== See also ==
- List of glaciers in the Antarctic
- Glaciology
