= Boyce Ridge =

Ridge in Antarctica

Location of Sentinel Range in Western Antarctica.

Central and southern Sentinel Range map.

Boyce Ridge is a 4.4-mile (7-km) ridge that extends westward from Taylor Ledge to the head of Nimitz Glacier in Sentinel Range, Ellsworth Mountains in Antarctica. The ridge adjoins the north flank of lower Branscomb Glacier.

The feature was named by the Advisory Committee on Antarctic Names (US-ACAN) in 2006 after Joseph Boyce, a retired NASA manager who was instrumental in facilitating the U.S. meteorite program in partnership with NSF and the Smithsonian Institution; a member of the ANSMET teams in the 2004–05, 2008–09, and 2012–13 field seasons.

In 1997, French mountaineer, Jean-Marc Gryzka, was killed in a climbing accident on Boyce Ridge. While descending Boyce Ridge, the sleds used by Gryzka and his climbing partner Bernard Virelaude unexpectedly slipped and dragged them down the slope. They plummeted over a steep drop on the ridge where at its bottom, Gryzka hit his head on a rock, killing him instantly. Virelaude landed in snow and was uninjured (1) .

== Location ==
Boyce Ridge is centred at 78°31′40″S 86°09′30″W. US mapping in 1961, updated in 1988.

== Maps ==
- Vinson Massif. Scale 1:250 000 topographic map. Reston, Virginia: US Geological Survey, 1988.
- Antarctic Digital Database (ADD). Scale 1:250000 topographic map of Antarctica. Scientific Committee on Antarctic Research (SCAR). Since 1993, regularly updated.
