= Bowie Crevasse Field =

Landform

Coordinates: 79°3′S 84°45′W

Bowie Crevasse Field is a large crevasse field at a break in slope on the Minnesota Glacier between the southeast end of the Bastien Range and Anderson Massif in the Ellsworth Mountains of Antarctica. It was named by the University of Minnesota Ellsworth Mountains Party, 1962–63, for Glenn E. Bowie, geophysicist with the party.
