= Ellsworth Subglacial Highlands =

Coordinates: 80°30′S 94°0′W

The Ellsworth Subglacial Highlands are a line of subglacial highlands in West Antarctica that extend west-southwest from the central Ellsworth Mountains to the vicinity of Mount Moore and Mount Woollard.

== Discovery ==
The existence of the feature was first indicated from seismic soundings by the Marie Byrd Land Traverse Party, 1957–58, led by Charles R. Bentley. The Ellsworth Subglacial Highlands were delineated in detail by the Scott Polar Research Institute – National Science Foundation – Technical University of Denmark airborne radio echo sounding program, 1967–79, and named in association with the Ellsworth Mountains.

== Geology ==
There is a subglacial valley up to 3 kilometres deep that is about 280 kilometres long and at least 22 kilometres across. In places the sub-glacial valley floor is more than 1500 metres below sea level.
