= Karnare Col =

Mountain pass in Antarctica

Location of Sentinel Range in Western Antarctica.

Sentinel Range map.

Karnare Col (Bulgarian: седловина Кърнаре, Sedlovina Karnare /se-dlo-vi-'na k&r-'na-re/) is the narrow rocky col of elevation 2,376 m (7,795 ft) between the southeast slopes of Mount Craddock and the northeast ridge of Mount Strybing, linking Craddock Massif to Owen Ridge in southern Sentinel Range, Ellsworth Mountains in Antarctica. It extends 1.7 km (1.1 mi) from east to west, with a depression in its eastern part. It is part of the glacial divide between Nimitz Glacier and Rutford Ice Stream, overlooking Severinghaus Glacier to the southwest and Saltzman Glacier to the northeast.

The col is named after the settlement of Karnare in Southern Bulgaria.

== Location ==
Karnare Col is centred at 78°38′50″S 85°07′32″W. The US mapped it in 1961, and updated it in 1988.

== Maps ==
- Vinson Massif. Scale 1:250 000 topographic map. Reston, Virginia: US Geological Survey, 1988.
- Antarctic Digital Database (ADD). Scale 1:250000 topographic map of Antarctica. Scientific Committee on Antarctic Research (SCAR). Since 1993, regularly updated.
