= Della Pia Glacier =

Glacier in Antarctica

- Location of Sentinel Range in Western Antarctica

- Location within Antarctica
- Location: Ellsworth Land
- Coordinates: 78°34′S 85°03′W
- Length: 10 nautical miles (19 km; 12 mi)
- Thickness: unknown
- Terminus: Thomas Glacier
- Status: unknown

Central and southern Sentinel Range map.

Della Pia Glacier (78°34′S 85°03′W) is a glacier that descends the east slope of Craddock Massif and flows between Mount Mohl and Elfring Peak into Thomas Glacier in the Sentinel Range, Ellsworth Mountains in Antarctica.

The glacier was named by the Advisory Committee on Antarctic Names (US-ACAN) in 2006 after Col. Max Della Pia, Commander of the 109th Airlift Wing, New York Air National Guard, 1999–2006, which logistically supported the U.S. Antarctic Program.

== See also ==
- List of glaciers in the Antarctic
- Glaciology

== Maps ==
- Vinson Massif. Scale 1:250 000 topographic map. Reston, Virginia: US Geological Survey, 1988.
- Antarctic Digital Database (ADD). Scale 1:250000 topographic map of Antarctica. Scientific Committee on Antarctic Research (SCAR). Since 1993, regularly updated.
