= Karasura Glacier =

Glacier in Bastien Range, Antarctica

- Location of Bastien Range in Western Antarctica

- Location within Antarctica
- Type: tributary
- Location: Ellsworth Land
- Coordinates: 78°48′42″S 85°47′50″W
- Length: 4 nautical miles (7.4 km; 4.6 mi)
- Width: 1.4 nautical miles (2.6 km; 1.6 mi)
- Thickness: unknown
- Terminus: Nimitz Glacier
- Status: unknown

Map of Sentinel Range and Bastien Range.

Karasura Glacier (Bulgarian: ледник Карасура, romanized: lednik Karasura, IPA: [ˈlɛdnik kɐrɐˈsurɐ]) is the 4 nautical miles (7.4 km; 4.6 mi) long and 1.4 nautical miles (2.6 km; 1.6 mi) wide glacier on the northeast side of Bastien Range in Ellsworth Mountains, Antarctica. It drains the north slopes of Bergison Peak and the east slopes of Patmos Peak, flows northwards, leaves the range and enters the southeast flowing Nimitz Glacier.

The glacier is named after the ancient Roman and medieval settlement of Karasura in Southern Bulgaria.

== Location ==
Karasura Glacier is centred at 78°48′42″S 85°47′50″W. US mapping in 1961 and 1988.

== See also ==
- List of glaciers in the Antarctic
- Glaciology

== Maps ==
- Vinson Massif. Scale 1:250 000 topographic map. Reston, Virginia: US Geological Survey, 1988.
- Antarctic Digital Database (ADD). Scale 1:250000 topographic map of Antarctica. Scientific Committee on Antarctic Research (SCAR). Since 1993, regularly updated.
