= Bolgrad Glacier =

Glacier in Antarctica

- Location of Sentinel Range in Western Antarctica

- Location within Antarctica
- Location: Ellsworth Land
- Coordinates: 78°44′S 85°08′W
- Length: 4 nmi (7 km; 5 mi)
- Width: 3 nmi (6 km; 3 mi)
- Thickness: unknown
- Terminus: Bender Glacier
- Status: unknown

entinel Range map.

Bolgrad Glacier (Bulgarian: ледник Болград, romanized: lednik Bolgrad, IPA: [ˈlɛdniɡ ˈbɔɫɡrɐt]) is the 7.4 km long and 5.7 km wide glacier on the west side of Owen Ridge in southern Sentinel Range in Ellsworth Mountains, Antarctica, situated south of Brook Glacier and north of Sirma Glacier. It drains west-southwestwards from Mount Allen, Mount Liptak and Mount Southwick, and flows south of Krusha Peak to leave the range and join Bender Glacier east of Gilbert Spur.

The glacier is named after the Bulgarian High School of Bolgrad, a major Bulgarian education centre in Ukraine established in 1858.

== Location ==
Bolgrad Glacier is centred at 78°44′00″S 85°08′00″W. US mapping in 1961, updated in 1988.

== See also ==
- List of glaciers in the Antarctic
- Glaciology

== Maps ==
- Vinson Massif. Scale 1:250 000 topographic map. Reston, Virginia: US Geological Survey, 1988.
- Antarctic Digital Database (ADD). Scale 1:250000 topographic map of Antarctica. Scientific Committee on Antarctic Research (SCAR). Since 1993, regularly updated.
