= Hall Nunatak =

Hall Nunatak (78°59′S 87°24′W) is a small nunatak about 2 nautical miles (4 km) southeastward of Thomas Nunatak, situated along the ice escarpment at the head of Minnesota Glacier, in the Ellsworth Mountains of Antarctica. It was named by the University of Minnesota Geological Party to these mountains (1963–64) for George S. Hall, a helicopter crew chief with the US Army 62nd Transportation Corps Detachment, who assisted the party.
