= Mount Osborne =

Mountain in Ellsworth Land, Antarctica

Location of Sentinel Range in Western Antarctica.

Central and southern Sentinel Range map.

Mount Osborne (78°37′S 84°47′W) is a mountain (2,600 m) standing 5 nautical miles (9 km) east of Mount Craddock, at the end of a side ridge running from the latter and featuring Sanchez Peak and Stolnik Peak, in the Sentinel Range, Ellsworth Mountains, Antarctica. It surmounts Thomas Glacier to the northeast and Saltzman Glacier to the south.

The peak was first mapped by the United States Geological Survey (USGS) from surveys and U.S. Navy air photos from 1957 to 1959. It was named by the Advisory Committee on Antarctic Names (US-ACAN) for Thomas M. Osborne, a Navy builder who helped construct and served at the South Pole Station with the winter party of 1957.

== See also ==
- Mountains in Antarctica

== Maps ==
- Vinson Massif. Scale 1:250 000 topographic map. Reston, Virginia: US Geological Survey, 1988.
- Antarctic Digital Database (ADD). Scale 1:250000 topographic map of Antarctica. Scientific Committee on Antarctic Research (SCAR). Since 1993, regularly updated.
