= Aster Glacier =

Glacier in Antarctica

- Location of Sentinel Range in Western Antarctica

- Location within Antarctica
- Location: Ellsworth Land
- Coordinates: 78°35′S 85°0′W
- Thickness: unknown
- Terminus: Thomas Glacier
- Status: unknown

Central and southern Sentinel Range map.

Aster Glacier (78°35′S 85°0′W) is an Antarctic glacier descending the east slope of Craddock Massif and flowing between Elfring Peak and Willis Ridge to Thomas Glacier in the Sentinel Range, Ellsworth Mountains in Antarctica.

== History ==
It was named by the Advisory Committee on Antarctic Names in 2006, after Richard Aster, Professor of Geophysics at Colorado State University, whose research in Antarctica includes volcanological studies at the Mount Erebus volcano observatory on Ross Island, glaciological, oceanic, and tectonic seismic source studies, seismic tomography, ice shelf studies, and the coupling of solid Earth geophysical processes and Antarctic ice sheet evolution.

== See also ==
- List of glaciers in the Antarctic
- Glaciology

== Maps ==
- Vinson Massif. Scale 1:250 000 topographic map. Reston, Virginia: US Geological Survey, 1988.
- Antarctic Digital Database (ADD). Scale 1:250000 topographic map of Antarctica. Scientific Committee on Antarctic Research (SCAR). Since 1993, regularly updated.
