= Mount Mullen =

Mountain in Ellsworth Land, Antarctica

Coordinates: 78°46′55″S 84°45′44″W

Location of Sentinel Range in Western Antarctica.

Sentinel Range map.

Mount Mullen is a double-peaked mountain 4.0 kilometres (2.5 mi) east-southeast of Mount Milton in the south Sentinel Range of the Ellsworth Mountains, Antarctica. Located at the west extremity of Petvar Heights, the mountain rises to an elevation of 2,400 metres (7,900 ft) and together with Kasilag Pass forms the divide between Kornicker Glacier and Wessbecher Glacier.

The feature was named by US-ACAN in 2006, after Roy R. Mullen, a former employee of the USGS (1960–95, associate chief of the National Mapping Division with responsibility for Antarctic activities 1980–95, USGS representative to SCAR).

== See also ==
- Mountains in Antarctica

== Maps ==
- Vinson Massif. Scale 1:250 000 topographic map. Reston, Virginia: US Geological Survey, 1988.
- Antarctic Digital Database (ADD). Scale 1:250000 topographic map of Antarctica. Scientific Committee on Antarctic Research (SCAR). Since 1993, regularly updated.
