= Elfring Peak =

Peak in Antarctica

Location of Sentinel Range in Western Antarctica.

Central and southern Sentinel Range map.

Elfring Peak (78°35′S 84°58′W) is a peak in Antarctica rising to 2,600 metres (8,500 ft) between the lower part of Della Pia Glacier and Aster Glacier, where the two glaciers enter Thomas Glacier on the east side of the Sentinel Range, Ellsworth Mountains. It was named by the Advisory Committee on Antarctic Names in 2006 after Christine A. Elfring, Director of the Polar Research Board of the United States National Academy of Sciences, 1996–2013.

== See also ==
- Mountains in Antarctica

== Maps ==
- Vinson Massif. Scale 1:250 000 topographic map. Reston, Virginia: US Geological Survey, 1988.
- Antarctic Digital Database (ADD). Scale 1:250000 topographic map of Antarctica. Scientific Committee on Antarctic Research (SCAR). Since 1993, regularly updated.
