= Owen Ridge =

Geographic formation in Antarctica

Location of Sentinel Range in Western Antarctica.

Sentinel Range map.

Owen Ridge (79°50′S 84°50′W) is a very high and rugged mountain ridge, 22 nautical miles (41 km) long, which forms the southwesternmost element of the Sentinel Range, Ellsworth Mountains. It extends south-southeast from Karnare Col and includes Mount Strybing (3,200 m), Mount Southwick and Lishness Peak, ending up in Bowers Corner. Mapped by United States Geological Survey (USGS) from surveys and U.S. Navy aerial photography, 1957–60. Named by Advisory Committee on Antarctic Names (US-ACAN) (1974) for Thomas B. Owen, Assistant Director of National and International Programs, National Science Foundation.

== Maps ==
- Vinson Massif. Scale 1:250 000 topographic map. Reston, Virginia: US Geological Survey, 1988.
- Antarctic Digital Database (ADD). Scale 1:250000 topographic map of Antarctica. Scientific Committee on Antarctic Research (SCAR). Since 1993, regularly updated.

== Features ==
Geographical features include:

- Arsela Peak
- Bolgrad Glacier
- Bowers Corner
- Brook Glacier
- Karnare Col
- Kasilag Pass
- Krusha Peak
- Lishness Peak
- Modren Peak
- Mount Allen
- Mount Inderbitzen
- Mount Southwick
- Mount Strybing
- Peristera Peak
- Sirma Glacier
- Stikal Peak
