= Huggler Peak =

Mountain in Antarctica

Huggler Peak (79°7′S 84°41′W) is a sharp snow-covered peak, 1,580 metres (5,180 ft) high, in the northern part of Anderson Massif, in the Heritage Range of the Ellsworth Mountains, Antarctica. It was mapped by the United States Geological Survey from surveys and U.S. Navy air photos from 1961 to 1966, and was named by the Advisory Committee on Antarctic Names for John Q. Huggler, a U.S. Navy Reserve storekeeper who assisted in various construction projects at McMurdo Station during U.S. Navy Operation Deep Freeze in 1966.

== See also ==
- Mountains in Antarctica
