= Ichev Nunatak =

Location of Bastien Range in Western Antarctica.

Map of Sentinel Range and Bastien Range.

Ichev Nunatak (Bulgarian: Ичев нунатак, \'i-chev 'nu-na-tak\) is the rocky hill rising to 1604 m in the northwestern periphery of Nimitz Glacier in Ellsworth Mountains. It is named after Milan Ichev, geologist and builder at St. Kliment Ohridski base in 2000-2001 and subsequent seasons.

== Location ==
Ichev Nunatak is located at 78°37′05.4″S 86°19′06″W, which is 4.83 km north of Mount Klayn and 12.88 km southeast of Ereta Peak in Bastien Range, and 15.42 km west of Mount Slaughter in Sentinel Range.

== Maps ==
- Vinson Massif. Scale 1:250 000 topographic map. Reston, Virginia: US Geological Survey, 1988.
- Antarctic Digital Database (ADD). Scale 1:250000 topographic map of Antarctica. Scientific Committee on Antarctic Research (SCAR). Since 1993, regularly updated.
