= Mount Southwick =

Mountain in Ellsworth Land, Antarctica

Location of Sentinel Range in Western Antarctica.

Sentinel Range map.

Mount Southwick (78°46′S 84°55′W) is a mountain (3,280 m) in Owen Ridge near the south end of the Sentinel Range of the Ellsworth Mountains in Antarctica, located 9 nautical miles (17 km) south-southeast of Mount Craddock. The peak surmounts Bolgrad Glacier to the northwest, Kornicker Glacier to the east and Sirma Glacier to the southwest.

It was first mapped by the United States Geological Survey (USGS) from surveys and U.S. Navy air photos from 1957 to 1959. It was named by the Advisory Committee on Antarctic Names (US-ACAN) for Tech. Sgt. Thomas E. Southwick, a United States Marine Corps (USMC) navigator on a Navy R4D reconnaissance flight to these mountains on January 28, 1958.

== Maps ==
- Vinson Massif. Scale 1:250 000 topographic map. Reston, Virginia: US Geological Survey, 1988.
- Antarctic Digital Database (ADD). Scale 1:250000 topographic map of Antarctica. Scientific Committee on Antarctic Research (SCAR). Since 1993, regularly updated.
