= Richard Aster =

American seismologist

Richard C. Aster is an American seismologist and Professor of Geophysics at Colorado State University. He received his bachelor's degree from the University of Wisconsin-Madison in 1983, double majoring in physics and electrical and computer engineering. He received his master's in geosciences from the same university, and he received his PhD in Earth science from the University of California, San Diego.

Aster's research includes seismic imaging, volcano seismology, microseismicity, seismic noise, seismic instrumentation, crustal and mantle seismology, fluvial seismology and cryoseismology. Dr. Aster served as president of the Seismological Society of America from 2009-2010. and as an elected board member of the society from 2008-2014. In 1997, Aster founded the New Mexico Tech IRIS PASSCAL Instrument Center (now the EarthScope Primary Instrument Center), which supports seismological studies around the world under the management of the EarthScope Consortium with primary funding from the National Science Foundation and U.S. Department of Energy, and served as the first Principal Investigator of the facility through 2013. Aster Glacier in the Ellsworth Mountains of Antarctica is named after Dr. Aster, who received the NSF Antarctic Services Medal for fieldwork in Antarctica in 1999. Aster was awarded the Distinguished Research Award by New Mexico Tech in 2010 and the university's Faculty Award in 2005. Aster was featured in the 2011-2012 BBC Horizon production The Core. Dr. Aster is a member of the Seismological Society of America, the American Geophysical Union, the Geological Society of America, the American Association for the Advancement of Science, and the International Glaciological Society.

Aster, with Brian Borchers of New Mexico Tech and Clifford Thurber of the University of Wisconsin-Madison, is a co-author of an internationally used geophysics/mathematical textbook Parameter Estimation and Inverse Problems, which was published by Elsevier in a third edition in November, 2018.

From 2009 to 2010 Aster presented U.S. seminars as part of the IRIS-SSA Distinguished Lecturership program.

In 2017 Aster was awarded the Distinguished Alumnus Award of the Department of Geoscience at the University of Wisconsin-Madison. In 2018 Aster was elected a Fellow of the Geological Society of America. In 2020, Aster began a three-year term as chair of the IRIS Consortium board of directors. Aster was elected a Fellow of the American Geophysical Union in 2021 and a Fellow of the American Association for the Advancement of Science in 2022. In 2024 and 2025 Aster was a Harry H. Hess Visiting Professor at Princeton University and a Gordon E. Moore Distinguished Scholar at the California Institute of Technology. In 2026 Aster received the Scholarship Impact Award for Career Achievement from Colorado State University.

== Publications ==
=== Books ===
- —; Brian Borchers; Clifford H. Thurber (2018). Parameter Estimation and Inverse Problems (3rd ed.). Oxford: Elsevier Science & Technology. ISBN 9780128046517.

=== Journal articles ===
- Richard Aster publications indexed by Google Scholar
