= Willis Ridge =

Location of Sentinel Range in Western Antarctica.

Central and southern Sentinel Range map.

Willis Ridge (78°36′S 85°0′W) is a narrow-crested ridge extending west–east between Aster Glacier and Sowers Glacier on the east side of Craddock Massif, Sentinel Range. It was named by the Advisory Committee on Antarctic Names in 2006 after Michael J. Willis, Ohio State University geologist in Antarctica for 7 field seasons, 1997–2006 (currently at the University of Colorado), including research at Siple Dome and the Whillans, Bindschadler and MacAyeal Ice Streams.

== Maps ==
- Vinson Massif. Scale 1:250 000 topographic map. Reston, Virginia: US Geological Survey, 1988.
- Antarctic Digital Database (ADD). Scale 1:250000 topographic map of Antarctica. Scientific Committee on Antarctic Research (SCAR). Since 1993, regularly updated.
