= Sanchez Peak =

Mountain in Antarctica

Location of Sentinel Range in Western Antarctica.

Central and southern Sentinel Range map.

Sanchez Peak is a 2,800-metre-high (9,200 ft) peak on the ridge that extends eastward to Mount Osborne in southern Sentinel Range of the Ellsworth Mountains, Antarctica. It was named by the Advisory Committee on Antarctic Names (US-ACAN) in 2006 after Richard D. Sanchez of U.S. Geological Survey, a senior physical scientist and specialist in remote sensing, image analysis and the use of GPS and GIS with respect to Antarctic mapping applications.

== Location ==
Sanchez Peak is located at 78°38′S 85°00′W, which is 2.5 miles (4.0 km) east of Mount Craddock and 1.16 miles (1.87 km) west of Stolnik Peak. US mapping in 1961, updated in 1988.

== Maps ==
- Vinson Massif. Scale 1:250 000 topographic map. Reston, Virginia: US Geological Survey, 1988.
- Antarctic Digital Database (ADD). Scale 1:250000 topographic map of Antarctica. Scientific Committee on Antarctic Research (SCAR). Since 1993, regularly upgraded and updated.
