= Chaplin Peak =

Mountain in Antarctica

Location of Sentinel Range in Western Antarctica.

Sentinel Range map.

Chaplin Peak (78°42′03″S 85°27′31″W) is the peak rising to 1978 m on the west side of Bender Glacier, 5 mi southwest of Mount Craddock and 1.3 miles north of Gilbert Spur in the Sentinel Range of Ellsworth Mountains, Antarctica. Surmounting Nimitz Glacier to the west.

The peak was named by US-ACAN in 2006 after Stephen Neville Chaplin, geologist and member of the Omega Foundation High Antarctic GPS Expedition 2005-06 that conducted GPS surveys of peaks in the area, including this peak. US mapping in 1961, updated in 1988.

== See also ==
- Mountains in Antarctica

== Maps ==
- Vinson Massif. Scale 1:250 000 topographic map. Reston, Virginia: US Geological Survey, 1988.
- Antarctic Digital Database (ADD). Scale 1:250000 topographic map of Antarctica. Scientific Committee on Antarctic Research (SCAR). Since 1993, regularly updated.
