= Thomas Nunatak =

Coordinates: 78°58′S 87°28′W

Thomas Nunatak is the northern of two nunataks which stand close together about 17 nautical miles (31 km) west of the Camp Hills, in the Ellsworth Mountains. Named by the University of Minnesota Geological Party to these mountains, 1963–64, for Hollie Thomas, helicopter crew chief with the 62nd Transportation Corps Detachment, who assisted the party.
