= Brook Glacier =

Glacier in Antarctica

- Location of Sentinel Range in Western Antarctica

- Location within Antarctica
- Location: Ellsworth Land
- Coordinates: 78°42′S 85°09′W
- Thickness: unknown
- Terminus: Bender Glacier
- Status: unknown

Sentinel Range map.

Brook Glacier (78°42′S 85°09′W) is a glacier that flows westward between Mount Strybing, Mount Allen and Krusha Peak on the west side of Owen Ridge in southern Sentinel Range, Ellsworth Mountains in Antarctica, and joins Bender Glacier east of Chaplin Peak. It was named by the Advisory Committee on Antarctic Names (2006) after Edward J. Brook, Professor of Geosciences, Oregon State University; U.S. Antarctic Project investigator of Antarctic paleoclimate in numerous field seasons from 1988; Chair, U.S. National Ice Core Working Group for use of Antarctic ice cores for research purposes, 2004–05.

== See also ==
- List of glaciers in the Antarctic
- Glaciology

== Maps ==
- Vinson Massif. Scale 1:250 000 topographic map. Reston, Virginia: US Geological Survey, 1988.
- Antarctic Digital Database (ADD). Scale 1:250000 topographic map of Antarctica. Scientific Committee on Antarctic Research (SCAR). Since 1993, regularly updated.
