= Bowers Corner =

Mountain in Antarctica

Location of Sentinel Range in Western Antarctica.

Central and southern Sentinel Range map.

Bowers Corner (79°1′S 84°21′W) is a peak located 9 nautical miles (17 km) southeast of Lishness Peak in Owen Ridge, the extreme south end of the main ridge of Sentinel Range in Ellsworth Mountains. The feature stands at the eastern side of the terminus of Nimitz Glacier where it bends, or makes a corner, on joining Minnesota Glacier. It was first mapped by the United States Geological Survey from surveys and from U.S. Navy air photos, 1957–59, and named by the Advisory Committee on Antarctic Names for Lieutenant Richard A. Bowers, U.S. Navy Reserve, who was in charge of the construction crew which built the IGY South Pole Station in the 1956–57 season.

== See also ==
- Mountains in Antarctica

== Maps ==
- Vinson Massif. Scale 1:250 000 topographic map. Reston, Virginia: US Geological Survey, 1988.
- Antarctic Digital Database (ADD). Scale 1:250000 topographic map of Antarctica. Scientific Committee on Antarctic Research (SCAR). Since 1993, regularly updated.
