= Bugueño Pinnacle =

Bugueño Pinnacle (78°37′00″S 85°15′00″W) is a slender rock peak that is reported to rise over 4400 m between Mount Rutford and Rada Peak on the crest of the Craddock Massif in the Sentinel Range. Named by the Advisory Committee on Antarctic Names in 2006 after Manuel Bugueño, a Chilean member of the Omega High Antarctic GPS Expedition to the Sentinel Range in 2005. He made ascents of Mount Craddock and Rada Peak and, with Camilo Rada, ran the GPS measurements of both.
