= Rullman Peak =

Mountain in Antarctica

Rullman Peak (79°13′S 84°32′W) is a peak, 1,910 m, located just south of Grimes Glacier in the Anderson Massif, Heritage Range. It was mapped by the United States Geological Survey (USGS) from surveys and U.S. Navy air photos from 1961 to 1966. It was named by the Advisory Committee on Antarctic Names (US-ACAN) for Chief Equipment Operator Gerald D. Rullman of the United States Navy, the direct supervisor of the crew that first pierced the Ross Ice Shelf at 160 ft during U.S. Navy Operation Deepfreeze in 1966. The drilling was accomplished near the Dailey Islands.

== See also ==
- Mountains in Antarctica
