= Moyher Ridge =

Ridge in the Ellsworth Mountains of Antarctica

Moyher Ridge (78°39′00″S 84°52′00″W) is a narrow rock ridge in the Ellsworth Mountains of Antarctica. It extends WSW–ENE between Saltzman Glacier and Giles Glacier in the south Sentinel Range of the Ellsworth Mountains. The ridge has a discontinuous appearance because of low ice cols between its peaks. Named by the Advisory Committee on Antarctic Names in 2006 after Marian Moyher, manager of United States Antarctic Program laboratory services to McMurdo, South Pole and Palmer Stations, 1997–2001; earlier, she was the supervisor of laboratory services at Palmer Station, 1993–97.
