= Taylor Ledge =

Location of Sentinel Range in Western Antarctica.

Central and southern Sentinel Range map.

Taylor Ledge is a notable flat-topped ridge displaying abrupt cliffs north and south, situated between Boyce Ridge and Mount Shinn on the west slope of Sentinel Range, Ellsworth Mountains in Antarctica. The upper surface of the feature is ice covered and relatively level except for 3373-meter Knutzen Peak on the north edge.

The ridge was named by the Advisory Committee on Antarctic Names (US-ACAN) in 2006 after Thomas N. and Edith L. Taylor, Department of Ecology and Evolutionary Biology, University of Kansas, Lawrence, husband and wife U.S. Antarctic Project (USAP) researchers of plant fossils in the central Transantarctic Mountains, 1980s–2004.

== Location ==
Taylor Ledge is centred at 78°30′S 85°57′W, which is 4 miles (6.4 km) southwest of Mount Shinn and 5 miles (8.0 km) northwest of Mount Vinson. US mapping in 1961, updated in 1988.

== Maps ==
- Vinson Massif. Scale 1:250 000 topographic map. Reston, Virginia: US Geological Survey, 1988.
- Antarctic Digital Database (ADD). Scale 1:250000 topographic map of Antarctica. Scientific Committee on Antarctic Research (SCAR). Since 1993, regularly updated.
