= Siefker Ridge =

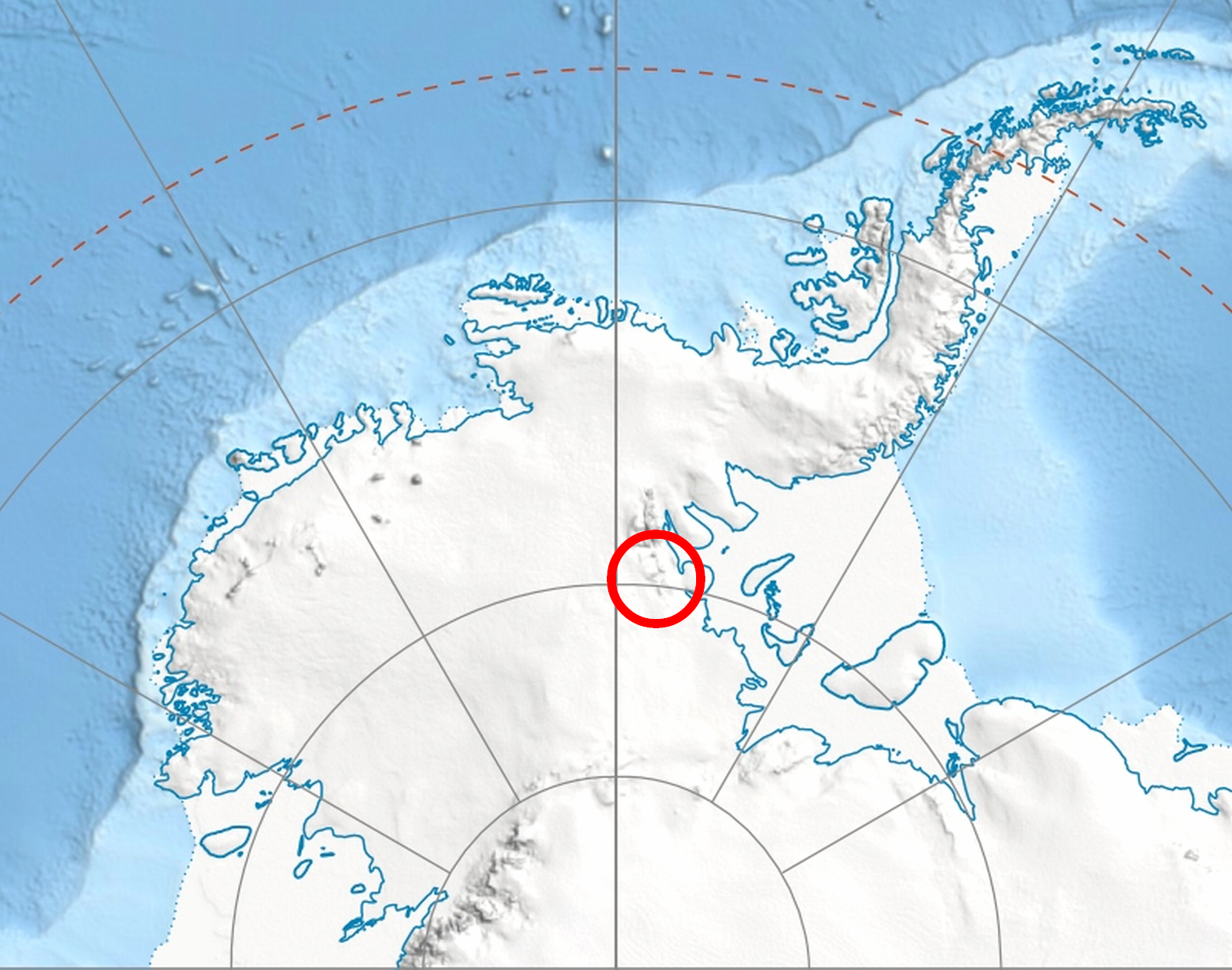
Location of Heritage Range in Western Antarctica.

Siefker Ridge (79°9′S 85°19′W) is a rugged ridge 6 miles (10 km) long, extending northwest from the west part of Anderson Massif in the Heritage Range. Named by the University of Minnesota Geological Party to these mountains, 1963–64, for electronics technician Dennis R. Siefker, U.S. Navy, who was in charge of the automatic weather station at the party's camp at Camp Hills.
