= Saltzman Glacier =

Glacier in Antarctica

- Location of Sentinel Range in Western Antarctica

- Location within Antarctica
- Type: tributary
- Location: Ellsworth Land
- Coordinates: 78°39′00″S 84°51′00″W
- Thickness: unknown
- Terminus: Thomas Glacier
- Status: unknown

Sentinel Range map

Saltzman Glacier (78°39′S 84°51′W) is a glacier that drains the north slopes of Mount Allen, the east slopes of Mount Strybing and Karnare Col, and the southeast slopes of Mount Craddock, and flows eastwards between Mount Osborne and Moyher Ridge into Thomas Glacier in southern Sentinel Range, Ellsworth Mountains in Antarctica.

Named by US-ACAN (2006) after Eric S. Saltzman, Department of Earth System Science, University of California, Irvine; USAP investigator of Antarctic ice core records of oceanic emissions; chair, 2006, U.S. National Ice Core Working Group for use of Antarctic ice cores for research purposes.

== See also ==
- List of glaciers in the Antarctic
- Glaciology

== Maps ==
- Vinson Massif. Scale 1:250 000 topographic map. Reston, Virginia: US Geological Survey, 1988.
- Antarctic Digital Database (ADD). Scale 1:250000 topographic map of Antarctica. Scientific Committee on Antarctic Research (SCAR). Since 1993, regularly updated.
