= Anderson Massif =

Coordinates: 79°10′S 84°45′W

The Anderson Massif is a prominent ice-covered massif about 10 nautical miles (20 km) across and rising to a height of 2,190 metres (7,190 ft), located at the junction of Splettstoesser Glacier and Minnesota Glacier in the Heritage Range of the Ellsworth Mountains, Antarctica. It was named by the Advisory Committee on Antarctic Names for John J. Anderson, a geologist who was field leader of the University of Minnesota Ellsworth Mountains Party, 1961–62.

== See also ==
- Mountains in Antarctica

Geographical features include:

- Bowie Crevasse Field
- Grimes Glacier
- Huggler Peak
- Minnesota Glacier
- Rullman Peak
- Siefker Ridge
- Splettstoesser Glacier
