= Mount Allen (Ellsworth Mountains) =

Mountain in Ellsworth Land, Antarctica

- Location within Antarctica

Highest point
- Elevation: 3,430 m (11,250 ft)
- Listing: Mountains in Antarctica
- Coordinates: 78°41′46″S 85°01′10″W

Geography
- Location: Ellsworth Land, Antarctica
- Parent range: Sentinel Range

Mount Allen' is a mountain (3,430 m) located 5.2 mi southeast of Mount Craddock in Owen Ridge, the southernmost portion of the main ridge of Sentinel Range, Ellsworth Mountains in Antarctica. The peak surmounts Saltzman Glacier to the north, Kornicker Glacier to the southeast, Bolgrad Glacier to the southwest and Brook Glacier to the west. It was mapped by the USGS from surveys and USN air photos in 1957–59. It was named by the US-ACAN for Lt. Forrest M. Allen, USNR, the co-pilot on reconnaissance flights from Byrd Station, 1957–58. Mount Allen was first successfully climbed on 26 December 2012, by Pachi Ibarra, Ralf Laier and Todd Passey.

== Maps ==
- Vinson Massif. Scale 1:250 000 topographic map. Reston, Virginia: US Geological Survey, 1988.
- Antarctic Digital Database (ADD). Scale 1:250000 topographic map of Antarctica. Scientific Committee on Antarctic Research (SCAR). Since 1993, regularly updated.
