= Rada Peak =

Mountain in Antarctica

Rada Peak (78°37′00″S 85°13′00″W) is a rounded peak that rises to 4001 m between Bugueño Pinnacle and Mount Craddock on the crest of the Craddock Massif in the Sentinel Range. Named by the Advisory Committee on Antarctic Names in 2006 after Camilo Rada Giacaman, a Chilean member of the Omega High Antarctic GPS Expedition to the Sentinel Range, 2004 and 2005; together with Manuel Bugueño in the latter season, he obtained GPS data for Mount Craddock and Rada Peak.
