= Tulaczyk Glacier =

Glacier in Antarctica

- Location within Antarctica
- Location: Bryan Coast
- Coordinates: 78°35′S 85°53′W
- Thickness: unknown
- Status: unknown

Central and southern Sentinel Range map.

Tulaczyk Glacier (78°35′S 85°53′W) is a steep valley glacier draining the west slope of Vinson Massif southwest of Príncipe de Asturias Peak, and descending between Cairns Glacier and Zapol Glacier in the Sentinel Range, Antarctica. The glacier flows southwestward and leaving the range, together with Cairns Glacier joins Nimitz Glacier west of Hodges Knoll and southeast of Klenova Peak. It was named by US-ACAN (2006) after Slawek M. Tulaczyk, Earth Sciences, University of California, Santa Cruz; USAP researcher of West Antarctic ice streams from 1998.

== See also ==
- List of glaciers in the Antarctic
- Glaciology

== Maps ==
- Vinson Massif. Scale 1:250 000 topographic map. Reston, Virginia: US Geological Survey, 1988.
- Antarctic Digital Database (ADD). Scale 1:250000 topographic map of Antarctica. Scientific Committee on Antarctic Research (SCAR). Since 1993, regularly updated.
