= Brichebor Peak (Antarctica) =

Mountain in Antarctica

Location of Sentinel Range in Western Antarctica.

Sentinel Range map.

Brichebor Peak (Bulgarian: връх Бричебор, romanized: vrah Brichebor, IPA: [ˈvrɤɣ ˈbrit͡ʃɛbor]) is the peak rising to 2900 m in Vinson Massif, Sentinel Range in Ellsworth Mountains, Antarctica, situated at the end of a side ridge descending southwestwards from Príncipe de Asturias Peak (4680 m). It surmounts Tulaczyk Glacier to the southeast and Cairns Glacier to the northwest.

The peak is named after Brichebor Peak in Rila Mountain, Southwestern Bulgaria.

== Location ==
Brichebor Peak is located at 78°34′11″S 85°54′58″W, which is 8.17 km south of Knutzen Peak (3373 m), 6.35 km southwest of Silverstein Peak (4790 m), 7.41 km west of Opalchenie Peak and 7.71 km northwest of Mount Slaughter (3444 m). US mapping in 1961, 1988 and 2007.

== See also ==
- Mountains in Antarctica

== Maps ==
- Vinson Massif. Scale 1:250 000 topographic map. Reston, Virginia: US Geological Survey, 1988.
- D. Gildea and C. Rada. Vinson Massif and the Sentinel Range. Scale 1:50 000 topographic map. Omega Foundation, 2007.
- Antarctic Digital Database (ADD). Scale 1:250000 topographic map of Antarctica. Scientific Committee on Antarctic Research (SCAR). Since 1993, regularly updated.
