= Grimes Glacier =

Glacier in Antarctica

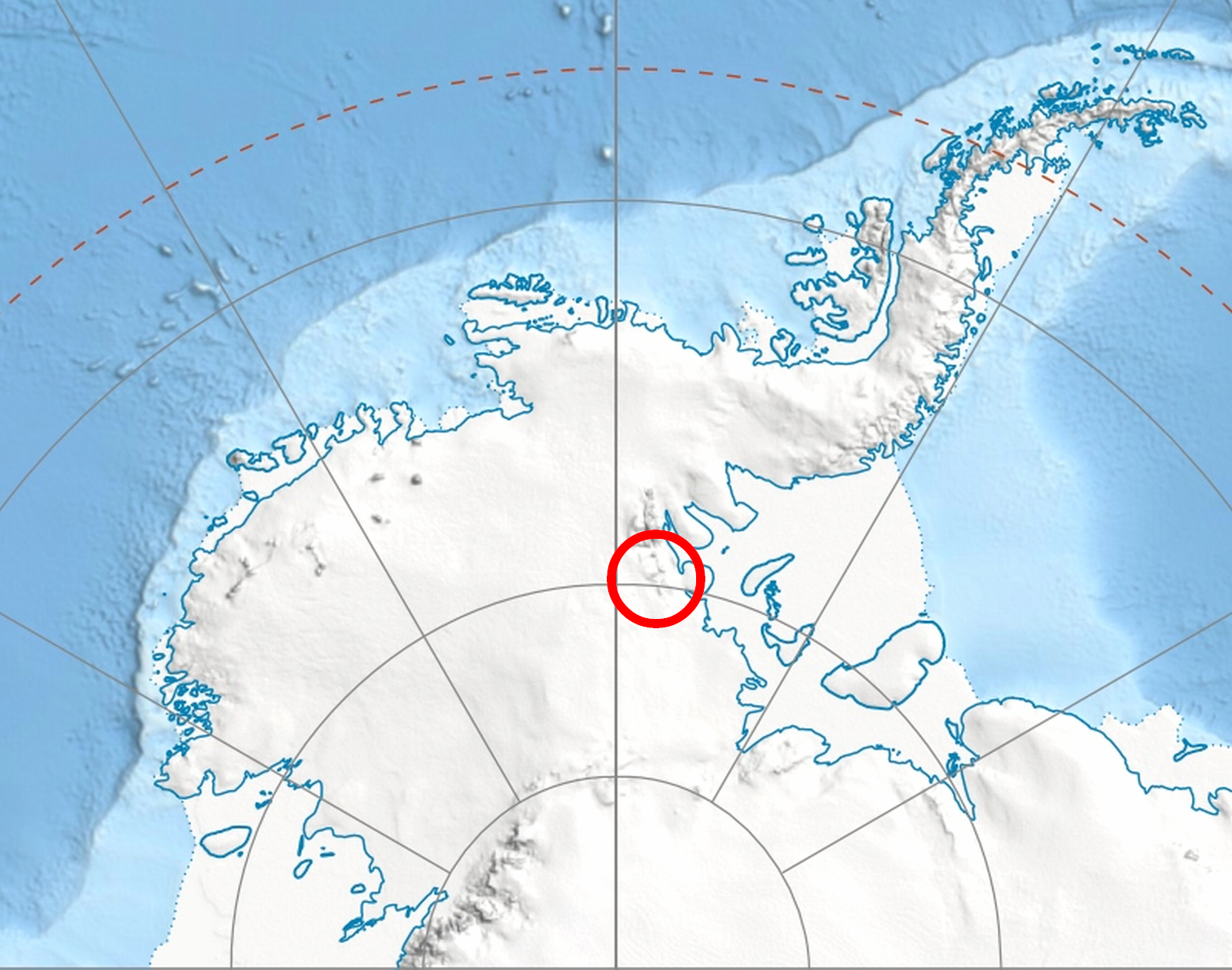
- Location of Heritage Range in Western Antarctica

- Location within Antarctica
- Type: steep
- Location: Ellsworth Land
- Coordinates: 79°12′00″S 84°22′00″W
- Thickness: unknown
- Terminus: Heritage Range
- Status: unknown

Grimes Glacier (79°12′S 84°22′W) is a steep glacier descending from the east side of Anderson Massif, in the Heritage Range of the Ellsworth Mountains of Antarctica. It was mapped by the United States Geological Survey from surveys and U.S. Navy air photos, 1961–66, and was named by the Advisory Committee on Antarctic Names for Master Chief Equipmentman Paul D. Grimes, U.S. Navy, who supervised the construction crews during relocation of Williams Air Field at McMurdo Sound in the closing month of U.S. Navy Operation Deep Freeze 1965.

== See also ==
- List of glaciers in the Antarctic
- Glaciology
