= Mount Woollard =

Mountain in Ellsworth Land, Antarctica

Mount Woollard (80°33′S 96°43′W) is a mountain (2,675 m) nearly 240 km (150 mi) west of the Heritage Range, Ellsworth Mountains, in Antarctica. It was discovered by the Marie Byrd Land Traverse Party (1957–58), and named for George P. Woollard, a member of the Technical Panel on Seismology and Gravity for the U.S. National Committee for the IGY, and a trainer of numerous Antarctic geophysicists.

Mount Woollard is an isolated mountain, with only Mount Moore (80°25′S 97°45′W) 8 miles to the north.
