= Cairns Glacier =

Glacier in Antarctica

- Location of Sentinel Range in Western Antarctica

- Location within Antarctica
- Type: tributary
- Location: Ellsworth Land
- Coordinates: 78°34′S 86°00′W
- Thickness: unknown
- Terminus: Nimitz Glacier
- Status: unknown

Central and southern Sentinel Range map.

Cairns Glacier (78°34′S 86°00′W) is a glacier on the west slope of Vinson Massif, Sentinel Range in Antarctica, situated between Branscomb Glacier and Tulaczyk Glacier. It flows along the northwest side of Brichebor Peak southwestwards, and leaving the range together with Tulaczyk Glacier joins Nimitz Glacier southeast of Klenova Peak.

The feature was named by US-ACAN (2006) after Stephen Douglas Cairns, research zoologist, Department of Invertebrate Zoology, National Museum of Natural History, Smithsonian Institution, 1985–2006; Board of Associated Editors, Antarctic Research Series, American Geophysical Union, 1990–95.

== See also ==
- List of glaciers in the Antarctic
- Glaciology

== Maps ==
- Vinson Massif. Scale 1:250 000 topographic map. Reston, Virginia: US Geological Survey, 1988.
- Antarctic Digital Database (ADD). Scale 1:250000 topographic map of Antarctica. Scientific Committee on Antarctic Research (SCAR). Since 1993, regularly updated.
