= Zapol Glacier =

Glacier in Antarctica

- Location of Sentinel Range in Western Antarctica.

- Location within Antarctica
- Location: Vinson Massif; Sentinel Range; Ellsworth Land
- Coordinates: 78°35′00″S 85°51′00″W
- Thickness: unknown
- Status: unknown

Central and southern Sentinel Range map.

Zapol Glacier (78°35′S 85°51′W) is a steep valley glacier draining the west slope of Vinson Massif south of Silverstein Peak and Príncipe de Asturias Peak, and descending between Tulaczyk Glacier and Donnellan Glacier in the Sentinel Range, Antarctica. The glacier flows southwestward and leaving the range joins Nimitz Glacier south of Hodges Knoll.

It was named by US-ACAN (2006) after Dr. Warren M. Zapol, Department of Anesthesia, Massachusetts General Hospital, whose long-term research near McMurdo Station on diving physiology of Weddell seals (begun mid-1970s) was part of a larger effort to understand how gas is handled in mammals as part of a search to understand SIDS (Sudden Infant Death Syndrome).

== See also ==
- List of glaciers in the Antarctic
- Glaciology

== Maps ==
- Vinson Massif. Scale 1:250 000 topographic map. Reston, Virginia: US Geological Survey, 1988.
- Antarctic Digital Database (ADD). Scale 1:250000 topographic map of Antarctica. Scientific Committee on Antarctic Research (SCAR). Since 1993, regularly updated.
