= Mount Milton =

Mountain in Ellsworth Land, Antarctica

Location of Sentinel Range in Western Antarctica.

Sentinel Range map.

Mount Milton (78°48′S 84°48′W) is a mountain 3,000 metres (10,000 ft) high located 11 nautical miles (20 km) south-southeast of Mount Craddock and 1.5 nautical miles (3 km) southeast of Mount Southwick, in the southern part of the Sentinel Range in the Ellsworth Mountains of Antarctica. It overlooks Kornicker Glacier to the northeast and Sirma Glacier to the west. Mount Milton was first mapped by the United States Geological Survey from surveys and U.S. Navy air photos, 1957–59, and was named by the Advisory Committee on Antarctic Names for Patrick G. Milton, aviation machinist's mate, U.S. Navy, who served as plane captain on a reconnaissance flight to these mountains on January 28, 1958.

== Maps ==
- Vinson Massif. Scale 1:250 000 topographic map. Reston, Virginia: US Geological Survey, 1988.
