= Wessbecher Glacier =

Glacier in Antarctica

- Location of Sentinel Range in Western Antarctica.

- Location within Antarctica
- Location: Sentinel Range, Ellsworth Land
- Coordinates: 78°10′00″S 85°30′00″W
- Length: 7 nmi (13 km; 8 mi)
- Thickness: unknown
- Status: unknown

Central and southern Sentinel Range map.

Wessbecher Glacier (78°53′S 84°18′W) is a glacier about 7 nautical miles (13 km) long, draining southeast from Mount Inderbitzen and south from Mount Mullen between Peristera Peak, Lishness Peak and Stikal Peak on the main ridge of Sentinel Range on the west and Marze Peak in Petvar Heights on the east, in the Ellsworth Mountains, Antarctica.

The glacier was first mapped by United States Geological Survey (USGS) from surveys and U.S. Navy air photos, 1957–59. It was named by Advisory Committee on Antarctic Names (US-ACAN) for Howard O. Wessbecher, a member of the winter party at McMurdo Sound, 1956, who was representative (assisting in logistical preparations) for the establishing of the South Pole Station.

== See also ==
- List of glaciers in the Antarctic
- Glaciology

== Maps ==
- Vinson Massif. Scale 1:250 000 topographic map. Reston, Virginia: US Geological Survey, 1988.
- Antarctic Digital Database (ADD). Scale 1:250000 topographic map of Antarctica. Scientific Committee on Antarctic Research (SCAR). Since 1993, regularly updated.
