= Crevasse =

Deep crack, or fracture, in an ice sheet or glacier

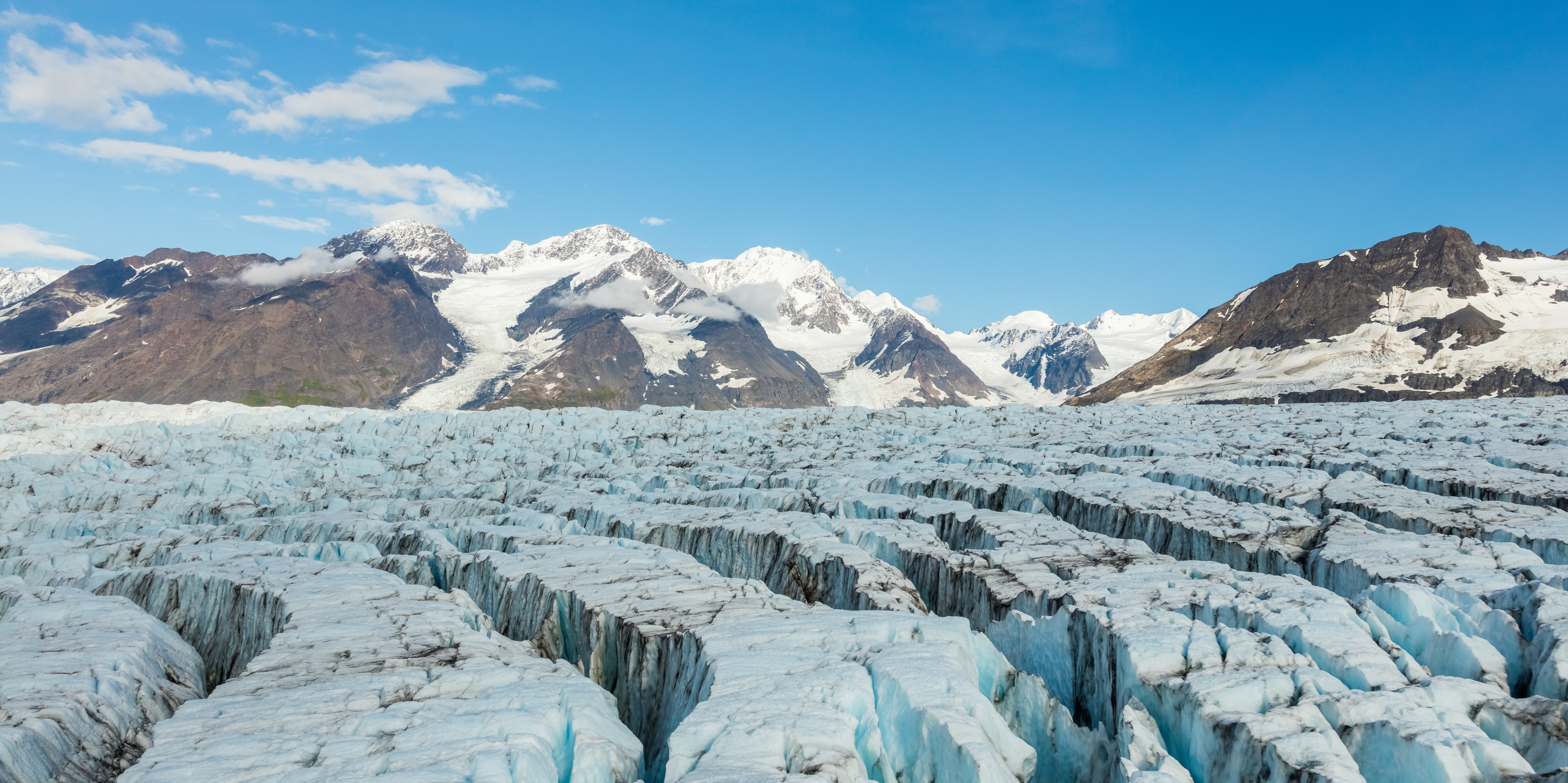
Transverse crevasses, Chugach State Park, Alaska

A crevasse is a deep crack that forms in a glacier or ice sheet. Crevasses form as a result of the movement and resulting stress associated with the shear stress generated when two semi-rigid pieces above a plastic substrate have different rates of movement. The resulting intensity of the shear stress causes a breakage along the faces.

== Description ==
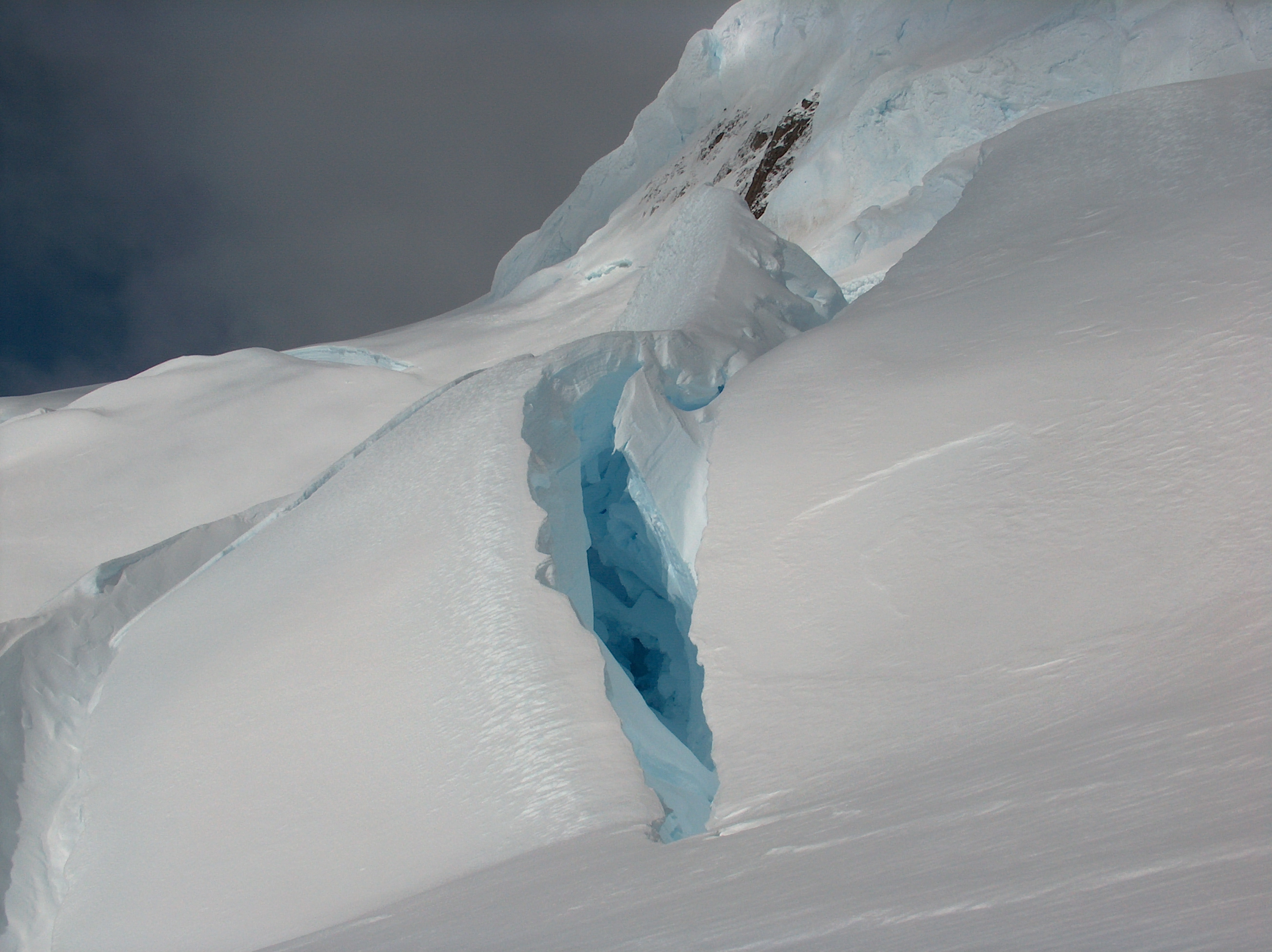
A crevasse in Tangra Mountains, Antarctica

Crevasses often have vertical or near-vertical walls, which can then melt and create seracs, arches, and other ice formations. These walls sometimes expose layers that represent the glacier's stratigraphy. Crevasse size often depends upon the amount of liquid water present in the glacier. A crevasse may be as deep as 45 metres (150 ft) and as wide as 20 metres (70 ft)

The presence of water in a crevasse can significantly increase its penetration. Water-filled crevasses may reach the bottom of glaciers or ice sheets and provide a direct hydrologic connection between the surface, where significant summer melting occurs, and the bed of the glacier, where additional water may moisten and lubricate the bed and accelerate ice flow. Direct drains of water from the top of a glacier, known as moulins, can also contribute to the lubrication and acceleration of ice flow.

== Types ==
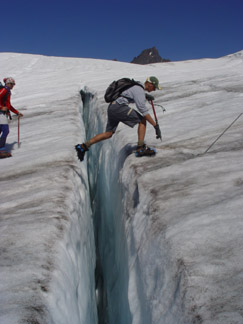
A man crosses a crevasse in Easton Glacier, Mount Baker, in the North Cascades, Washington.

- Longitudinal crevasses form parallel to flow where the glacier width is expanding. They develop in areas of tensile stress, such as where a valley widens or bends. They are typically concave down and form an angle greater than 45° with the margin.
- Splaying crevasses appear along the edges of a glacier and result from shear stress from the margin of the glacier and longitudinal compressing stress from lateral extension. They extend from the glacier's margin and are concave up with respect to glacier flow, making an angle less than 45° with the margin.
- Transverse crevasses are the most common crevasse type. They form in a zone of longitudinal extension where the principal stresses are parallel to the direction of glacier flow, creating extensional tensile stress. These crevasses stretch across the glacier transverse to the flow direction, or cross-glacier. They generally form where a valley becomes steeper.

== Dangers ==
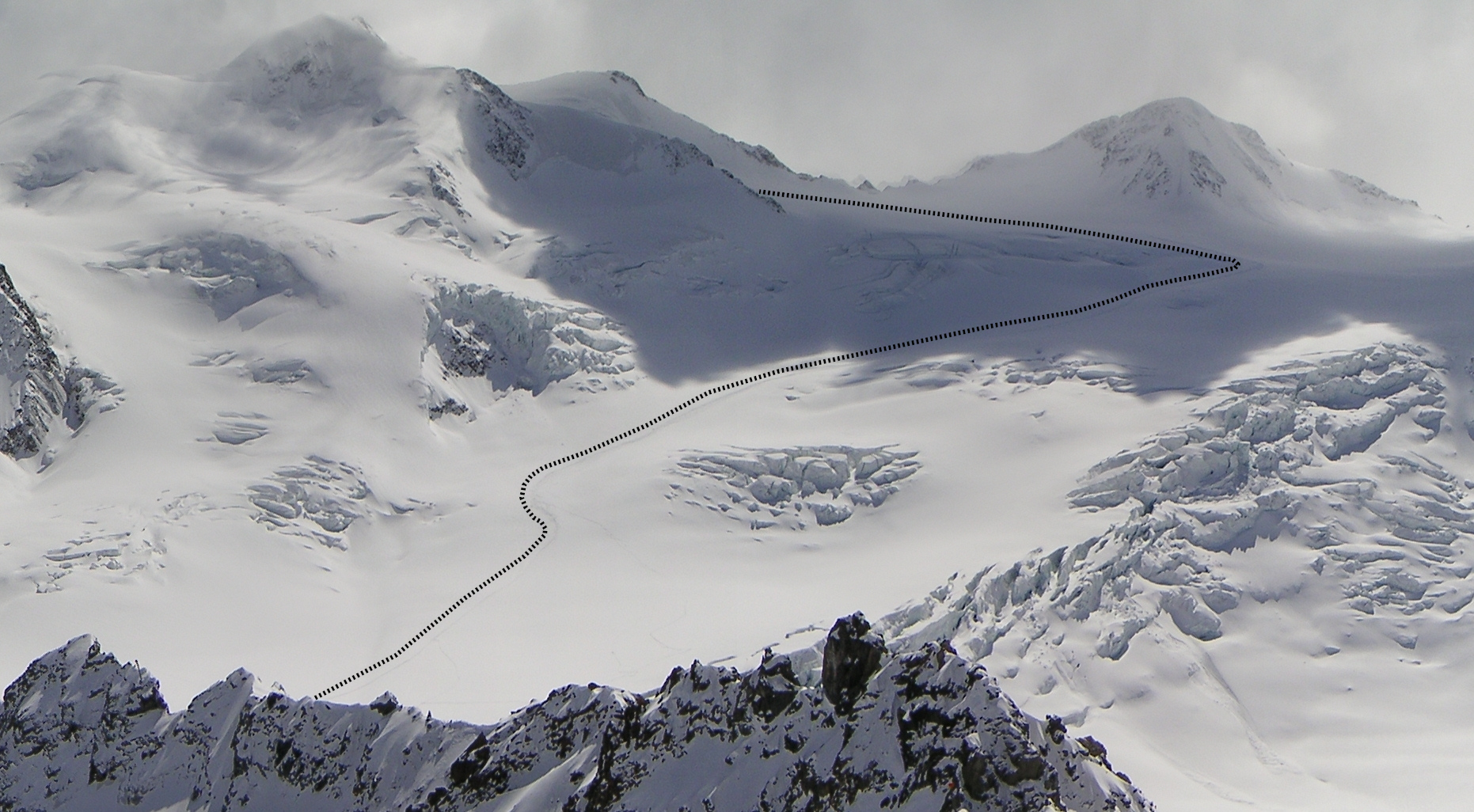
The glacier Taschachferner below the Wildspitze (left, 3.768 m) in Tyrolia in Austria in April 2005. There are some zones with large open crevasses, e.g., the spot-shaped area below the middle of the image and most right. The line marks the ascent track of mountaineers on skis which intentionally avoided these dangerous areas.

Falling into glacial crevasses can be dangerous and life-threatening. Some glacial crevasses (such as on the Khumbu Icefall at Mount Everest) can be 50 metres (160 ft) deep, which can cause fatal injuries upon falling. Hypothermia is often a cause of death when falling into a crevasse.

A crevasse may be covered, but not necessarily filled, by a snow bridge made of the previous years' accumulation and snow drifts. The result is that crevasses are rendered invisible, and thus potentially lethal to anyone attempting to navigate across a glacier. Occasionally a snow bridge over an old crevasse may begin to sag, providing some landscape relief, but this cannot be relied upon.

The danger of falling into a crevasse can be minimized by roping together multiple climbers into a rope team, and the use of friction knots.

== On the Moon ==
The Lunar Reconnaissance Orbiter (LRO) discovered numerous crevasses on the chaotic looking floors of bowl shaped craters and craterlets. The crater Rümker E, south of Mons Rümker in the northern part of Oceanus Procellarum, shows a concentric system of crevasses.

Several space artists such as Chesley Bonestell depicted systems of arc shaped crevasses in their paintings of lunar surfaces. These arc shaped crevasses are also seen in paintings of planetary surfaces, such as the solar heated surface of planet Mercury.

== See also ==
- Bergschrund – Crevasse between moving glacier ice and the stagnant ice or firn above
- Bowie Crevasse Field – Landform
- Glaciology – Scientific study of ice and natural phenomena involving ice
- Crevasse rescue – Technique in mountaineering

== Bibliography ==
- Das SB, Joughin I, Behn MD, Howat IM, King MA, Lizarralde D, Bhatia MP (2008). "Fracture propagation to the base of the Greenland Ice Sheet during supraglacial lake drainage". Science. 320 (5877): 778–781. Bibcode:2008Sci...320..778D. doi:10.1126/science.1153360. hdl:1912/2506. PMID 18420900. S2CID 41582882.
- Paterson, W.S.B. (1994). The Physics of Glaciers (3rd ed.). ISBN 0-7506-4742-6.
- van der Veen CJ (1998). "Fracture mechanics approach to penetration of surface crevasses on glaciers". Cold Regions Science and Technology. 27 (1): 31–47. Bibcode:1998CRST...27...31V. doi:10.1016/s0165-232x(97)00022-0.
