= Mount Moore =

Mountain mass in western Antarctica

Mount Moore (80°25′S 97°45′W) is an isolated quartzitic mountain mass that rises 305 m above the snow surface of western Antarctica. With only Mount Woollard nearby, 8 nautical miles (15 km) to the south, it stands about 150 nautical miles (280 km) west of the Heritage Range, Ellsworth Mountains. It was discovered by the Marie Byrd Land Traverse Party on 4 February 1958 and is named after Lieutenant John P. Moore, U.S. Navy Reserve, a helicopter pilot aboard the USS Atka, who died in a helicopter crash near Kainan Bay in January 1955.
