= Mount Inderbitzen =

Mountain in Ellsworth Land, Antarctica

Location of Sentinel Range in Western Antarctica.

Sentinel Range map.

Mount Inderbitzen (78°49′S 84°47′W) is a mountain rising to over 2,600 metres (8,500 ft), located 12 nautical miles (22 km) south-southeast of Mount Craddock and 1.5 nautical miles (3 km) south of Mount Milton in Owen Ridge, the southernmost part of the Sentinel Range of the Ellsworth Mountains in Antarctica. It surmounts Wessbecher Glacier to the southeast and Sirma Glacier to the northwest.

The mountain was first mapped by the U.S. Geological Survey (USGS) from surveys and U.S. Navy aerial photographs from 1957 to 1959. It was named by the Advisory Committee on Antarctic Names in 1994 after Anton L. Inderbitzen, who was Associate Chief Scientist in the Division of Polar Programs at the National Science Foundation (NSF) between 1983–86 and was head of the Antarctic Staff at the NSF between 1986 and 1991. From 1991 he was the Deputy Assistant Director for Research at the USGS. At the NSF, Inderbitzen was responsible for the coordination and planning of all scientific activities within the United States Antarctic Program, and for the formulation and enforcement of U.S. environmental regulations in Antarctica.

== See also ==
- Mountains in Antarctica

== Maps ==
- Vinson Massif. Scale 1:250 000 topographic map. Reston, Virginia: US Geological Survey, 1988.
- Antarctic Digital Database (ADD). Scale 1:250000 topographic map of Antarctica. Scientific Committee on Antarctic Research (SCAR). Since 1993, regularly updated.
