= Mount Strybing =

Mountain in Ellsworth Land, Antarctica

Location of Sentinel Range in Western Antarctica.

Sentinel Range map.

Mount Strybing (78°41′S 85°4′W) is a mountain (3,200 m) standing on Owen Ridge 3 nautical miles (6 km) southeast of Mount Craddock in the south part of Sentinel Range, Ellsworth Mountains. It is linked to Mount Craddock by Karnare Col, and surmounts Saltzman Glacier to the northeast, Brook Glacier to the southwest, and Severinghaus Glacier to the west-northwest.

The peak was first mapped by the United States Geological Survey (USGS) from surveys and U.S. Navy air photos from 1957 to 1959. It was named by the Advisory Committee on Antarctic Names (US-ACAN) for M/Sgt. Henry Strybing, a United States Marine Corps (USMC) navigator on reconnaissance flights of R4D aircraft to this region in the 1957–58 season. The R4D aircraft, named "Charger" crashed landed after the discovery and a rescue crew helped to repair the aircraft on site. The aircraft and crew eventually made a snow/ice takeoff and returned safely.

== Maps ==
- Vinson Massif. Scale 1:250 000 topographic map. Reston, Virginia: US Geological Survey, 1988.
- Antarctic Digital Database (ADD). Scale 1:250000 topographic map of Antarctica. Scientific Committee on Antarctic Research (SCAR). Since 1993, regularly updated.
