= Kornicker Glacier =

Glacier in Antarctica

- Location of Sentinel Range in Western Antarctica

- Location within Antarctica
- Type: tributary
- Location: Ellsworth Land
- Coordinates: 78°43′00″S 84°35′00″W
- Thickness: unknown
- Terminus: Thomas Glacier
- Status: unknown

Sentinel Range map.

Kornicker Glacier (78°43′S 84°35′W) is a glacier draining northeastwards from the cirque bounded by Mount Liptak, Mount Southwick, Mount Milton and Mount Mullen in the southern Sentinel Range of the Ellsworth Mountains in Antarctica. The glacier flows along the northwestern side of Petvar Heights and merges with the terminus of the southeast-flowing Thomas Glacier as both glaciers emerge from the range.

== Name origin ==
Kornicker Glacier was named by the Advisory Committee on Antarctic Names (2006) after Louis S. Kornicker, a research zoologist at the Department of Invertebrate Zoology (Crustacea), National Museum of Natural History, Smithsonian Institution, 1964–2006, and a member of the Board of Associated Editors, Antarctic Research Series, American Geophysical Union, 1978–90.

== See also ==
- List of glaciers in the Antarctic
- Glaciology

== Maps ==
- Vinson Massif. Scale 1:250 000 topographic map. Reston, Virginia: US Geological Survey, 1988.
- Antarctic Digital Database (ADD). Scale 1:250000 topographic map of Antarctica. Scientific Committee on Antarctic Research (SCAR). Since 1993, regularly updated.
