= Thomas Glacier =

Glacier in Ellsworth Land, Antarctica

- Location of Sentinel Range in Western Antarctica.

- Location within Antarctica
- Location: Vinson Massif; Sentinel Range
- Coordinates: 78°40′S 84°0′W
- Length: 17 nmi (31 km; 20 mi)
- Thickness: unknown
- Status: unknown

Central and southern Sentinel Range map.

Thomas Glacier (78°40′S 84°0′W) is a roughly Z-shaped glacier which drains the southeast slopes of Vinson Massif and flows for 17 nautical miles (31 km) through the south part of the Sentinel Range, Ellsworth Mountains, leaving the range between Doyran and Petvar Heights south of Johnson Spur.

The glacier was discovered by U.S. Navy Squadron VX-6 on photographic flights of 14–15 December 1959, and mapped by United States Geological Survey (USGS) from the photos. It was named by Advisory Committee on Antarctic Names (US-ACAN) for R. Admiral Charles W. Thomas, USCG, veteran of Antarctic expeditions in the 1950s.

== Tributaries glaciers ==
- Kornicker Glacier
- Saltzman Glacier
- Sowers Glacier
- Aster Glacier
- Della Pia Glacier
- Obelya Glacier

== See also ==
- List of glaciers in the Antarctic
- Glaciology

== Maps ==
- Vinson Massif. Scale 1:250 000 topographic map. Reston, Virginia: US Geological Survey, 1988.
- Antarctic Digital Database (ADD). Scale 1:250000 topographic map of Antarctica. Scientific Committee on Antarctic Research (SCAR). Since 1993, regularly updated.
