= Lishness Peak =

Mountain in Antarctica

Location of Vinson Massif in Western Antarctica.

Central and southern Sentinel Range map.

Lishness Peak (78°53′S 84°45′W) is a peak, 2,200 metres (7,200 ft) high, in Owen Ridge near the south end of the Sentinel Range of the Ellsworth Mountains in Antarctica, rising at the east side of Nimitz Glacier, 1 nautical mile (2 km) southeast of Wilson Peak and 8.8 nautical miles (16 km) northwest of Bowers Corner. It was first mapped by the United States Geological Survey from surveys and U.S. Navy air photos from 1957 to 1959, and was named by the Advisory Committee on Antarctic Names for Alton R. Lishness, a radio operator on a U.S. Navy R4D exploratory flight to this area on January 28, 1958.

== See also ==
- Mountains in Antarctica

== Maps ==
- Vinson Massif. Scale 1:250 000 topographic map. Reston, Virginia: US Geological Survey, 1988.
- Antarctic Digital Database (ADD). Scale 1:250000 topographic map of Antarctica. Scientific Committee on Antarctic Research (SCAR). Since 1993, regularly updated.
