= Mount Liptak =

Mountain in Ellsworth Land, Antarctica

Location of Sentinel Range in Western Antarctica.

Sentinel Range map.

Mount Liptak (78°45′S 84°54′W) is a mountain, 3,052 metres (10,013 ft) high with twin summits, located 7 nautical miles (13 km) southeast of Mount Craddock in the Sentinel Range of the Ellsworth Mountains in Antarctica. It surmounts Bolgrad Glacier to the west and Kornicker Glacier to the east.

It was first mapped by the United States Geological Survey from surveys and U.S. Navy air photos from 1957 to 1959, and was named by the Advisory Committee on Antarctic Names for L.H. Liptak, an aviation machinist mate in the U.S. Navy who served as plane captain on the first reconnaissance flights to this vicinity in January 1958.

Mount Liptak was first successfully climbed on 28 December 2012, by Pachi Ibarra, Ralf Laier and Todd Passey.

== See also ==
- Mountains in Antarctica

== Maps ==
- Vinson Massif. Scale 1:250 000 topographic map. Reston, Virginia: US Geological Survey, 1988.
- Antarctic Digital Database (ADD). Scale 1:250000 topographic map of Antarctica. Scientific Committee on Antarctic Research (SCAR). Since 1993, regularly updated.
