= Craddock Massif =

Mountain massif in West Antarctica

- Location within Antarctica

Highest point
- Elevation: 4,477 m (14,688 ft)
- Coordinates: 78°36′S 85°18′W

Geography
- Location: West Antarctica (Chilean claim)
- Parent range: Sentinel Range

Climbing
- First ascent: Jed Brown (US) December 2006
- Easiest route: snow/ice climb

Sentinel Range with Craddock Massif, USGS Map

Craddock Massif is a mountain massif in the Sentinel Range of the Ellsworth Mountains, in the Chilean claim of West Antarctica.

== Location and highest point ==
Craddock Massif is located at the southeastern side of Vinson Massif, between Hammer Col and Karnare Col linking it to Vinson Massif and the southern Sentinel Range respectively. The highest point of Craddock Massif is Mount Rutford, a sharp peak that rises to 4,477 metres (14,688 ft). The Craddock Massif also includes (from north to south) Bugueño Pinnacle, Rada Peak and Mount Craddock.

== Discovery and naming ==
Sentinel Range was first sighted and photographed from the air on November 23, 1935, by Lincoln Ellsworth. The entire range, including Craddock Massif, was mapped by the United States Geological Survey from aerial photography taken by the U.S. Navy, 1958–61.

This massif was originally named "Mount Craddock" by the Advisory Committee on Antarctic Names (US-ACAN) in 1965, but subsequent maps limited the name to the massif's southernmost peak, a modification that was adopted by US-ACAN in 2006 when it approved the name Craddock Massif. The massif is named after Professor J. Campbell Craddock (1930–2006), the leader of the 1962–63 University of Minnesota geological expedition to the Sentinel and Heritage Ranges of the Ellsworth Mountains.

== Maps ==
- Vinson Massif. Scale 1:250 000 topographic map. Reston, Virginia: US Geological Survey, 1988.
- D. Gildea and C. Rada. Vinson Massif and the Sentinel Range. Scale 1:50 000 topographic map. Omega Foundation, 2007.
- Antarctic Digital Database (ADD). Scale 1:250000 topographic map of Antarctica. Scientific Committee on Antarctic Research (SCAR). Since 1993, regularly updated.

== See also ==
- Sentinel Range
