= Bastien Range =

Mountain range in Antarctica

- Location within Antarctica

Geography
- Continent: Antarctica
- Parent range: Pensacola Mountains

The Bastien Range (78°50′S 086°00′W) is a mountain range of moderate height which extends in a northwest–southeast direction for about 40 nautical miles (74 km; 46 mi), flanking the southwest side of the Nimitz Glacier and the Sentinel Range, in the Ellsworth Mountains, Antarctica.

== Name ==
The Bastien Range was named by the United States Advisory Committee on Antarctic Names (US-ACAN) for Thomas W. Bastien, geologist, leader of the helicopter-supported University of Minnesota Geological Party to these mountains in 1963–64. Bastien was also a member of a party to the Ellsworth Mountains in 1961–62.

== Features ==
Bastien Range in southwest of map

United States mapping of the Bastien Range was undertaken in 1961 and 1988. Geographical features include, from north to south:

=== Ereta Peak ===
78.52061°S 86.62878°W ( Copernix satellite image)

A peak rising to 2,280 metres (7,480 ft) high at the north extremity of Bastien Range. It is situated 12.88 km northwest of Ichev Nunatak, 19.63 km southwest of Mount Gardner and 22.5 km west of Mount Vinson in Sentinel Range. It has steep and partly ice-free north and southwest slopes. Erata Peak surmounts upper Nimitz Glacier to the southeast. It is named after the Thracian town of Ereta in Northeastern Bulgaria.

=== Mount Klayn ===
78.66083°S 86.28175°W (Copernix satellite image)

A peak rising to 2,086 metres (6,844 ft) high in the northern portion of Bastien Range. The feature extends 2.8 km in south-southwest – north-northeast direction and is 900 metres (3,000 ft) wide. It is situated 10.84 km northwest of Mount Fisek, 12.76 km northeast of Wild Knoll, 17.43 km southeast of Ereta Peak, 4.83 km south of Ichev Nunatak, and 17.6 km west of Mount Atkinson in Sentinel Range. It has steep and partly ice-free southeast slopes. Mount Klayn surmounts upper Nimitz Glacier to the northeast. It is named after Laslo Klayn, geologist at St. Kliment Ohridski Base in 1999/2000 and subsequent seasons.

=== Mount Fisek ===
78.73500°S 85.96194°W (Copernix satellite image)

A peak rising to 1,623 metres (5,325 ft) high in the central portion of Bastien Range. It is situated 9.6 km north of Patmos Peak, 12 km east-northeast of Wild Knoll, 10.84 km southeast of Mount Klayn, and 22 km west of Mount Liptak in Sentinel Range. It has steep and partly ice-free north, east and southwest slopes. Mount Fisek surmounts Nimitz Glacier to the northeast. It is named after Fisek Hill in Northeastern Bulgaria.

=== Wild Knoll ===
78.76783°S 86.48689°W (Copernix satellite image)

A peak rising to 1,773 metres (5,817 ft) high in the central portion of Bastien Range in Ellsworth Mountains. It is situated 12.76 km southwest of Mount Klayn, 12 km west-southwest of Mount Fisek and 13.65 km northwest of Patmos Peak. Steep and partly ice-free west slopes. Wild Knoll surmounts upper Minnesota Glacier to the south-southwest. It is named after the Swiss natural history illustrator John James Wild (1824-1900), a member of the British 1872–76 Challenger expedition who took the first photographs in the Antarctic region in 1874.

=== Patmos Peak ===
78.82064°S 85.91972°W (Copernix satellite image)

A peak rising to 2,044 metres (6,706 ft) high in the southern portion of Bastien Range. It is situated 4.66 km northwest of Bergison Peak, 13.65 km southeast of Wild Knoll, 9.6 km south of Mount Fisek, and 22.54 km west of Mount Inderbitzen in Sentinel Range. It has steep and partly ice-free east and south slopes. Patmos Peak surmounts Nimitz Glacier and its tributary Karasura Glacier to the northeast, and upper Minnesota Glacier to the southwest. It is named after the medieval fortress of Patmos in Southern Bulgaria.

=== Bergison Peak ===
78.85397°S 85.79000°W (Copernix satellite image)

A peak rising to 1,985 metres (6,512 ft) in the southern portion of Bastien Range. It is situated 25 km northwest of O’Neal Nunataks, 4.66 km southeast of Patmos Peak. It has steep and partly ice-free W slopes. Bergison Peak surmounts Karasura Glacier to the north, Nimitz Glacier to the northeast, and upper Minnesota Glacier to the southwest. It is named after the Thracian fortress of Bergison in Southern Bulgaria.

=== O'Neal Nunataks ===
79°01′S 85°00′W

A small, linear group of nunataks that mark the south end of Bastien Range. They were named by the University of Minnesota geological parties to the Ellsworth Mountains for Jerry O'Neill, aerographer with these parties in 1963-64 and 1964-65.

=== Camp Hills ===
78°58′S 85°50′W

A small group of hills which lie between the south portion of the Bastien Range and the Minnesota Glacier. So named by the University of Minnesota Geological Party, 1963-64, because they established their base camp (Camp Gould) near these hills.

== Sources ==
- Alberts, Fred G., ed. (1995), Geographic Names of the Antarctic (PDF) (2 ed.), United States Board on Geographic Names This article incorporates public domain material from websites or documents of the United States Board on Geographic Names.

REMA Explorer
The Reference Elevation Model of Antarctica (REMA) gives ice surface measurements of most of the continent. When a feature is ice-covered, the ice surface will differ from the underlying rock surface and will change over time. To see ice surface contours and elevation of a feature as of the last REMA update,
- Open the Antarctic REMA Explorer
- Enter the feature's coordinates in the box at the top left that says "Find address or place", then press enter
  The coordinates should be in DMS format, e.g. 65°05'03"S 64°01'02"W. If you only have degrees and minutes, you may not be able to locate the feature.
- Hover over the icons at the left of the screen
- Find "Hillshade" and click on that
  In the bottom right of the screen, set "Shading Factor" to 0 to get a clearer image
- Find "Contour" and click on that
  In the "Contour properties" box, select Contour Interval = 1m
  You can zoom in and out to see the ice surface contours of the feature and nearby features
- Find "Identify" and click on that
  Click the point where the contour lines seem to indicate the top of the feature
  The "Identify" box will appear to the top left. The Orthometric height is the elevation of the ice surface of the feature at this point.

- Antarctic REMA Explorer (Digital Elevation Models created by the Polar Geospatial Center from Maxar imagery), Polar Geospatial Center, University of Minnesota, 2019
- "Bergison Peak", Composite Gazetteer of Antarctica, Scientific Committee on Antarctic Research
- "Ereta Peak", Composite Gazetteer of Antarctica, Scientific Committee on Antarctic Research
- "Mount Fisek", Composite Gazetteer of Antarctica, Scientific Committee on Antarctic Research
- "Mount Klayn", Composite Gazetteer of Antarctica, Scientific Committee on Antarctic Research
- "Patmos Peak", Composite Gazetteer of Antarctica, Scientific Committee on Antarctic Research
- "Wild Knoll", Composite Gazetteer of Antarctica, Scientific Committee on Antarctic Research
- This article incorporates public domain material from websites or documents of the United States Geological Survey.
