= Nimitz Glacier =

Glacier in Antarctica

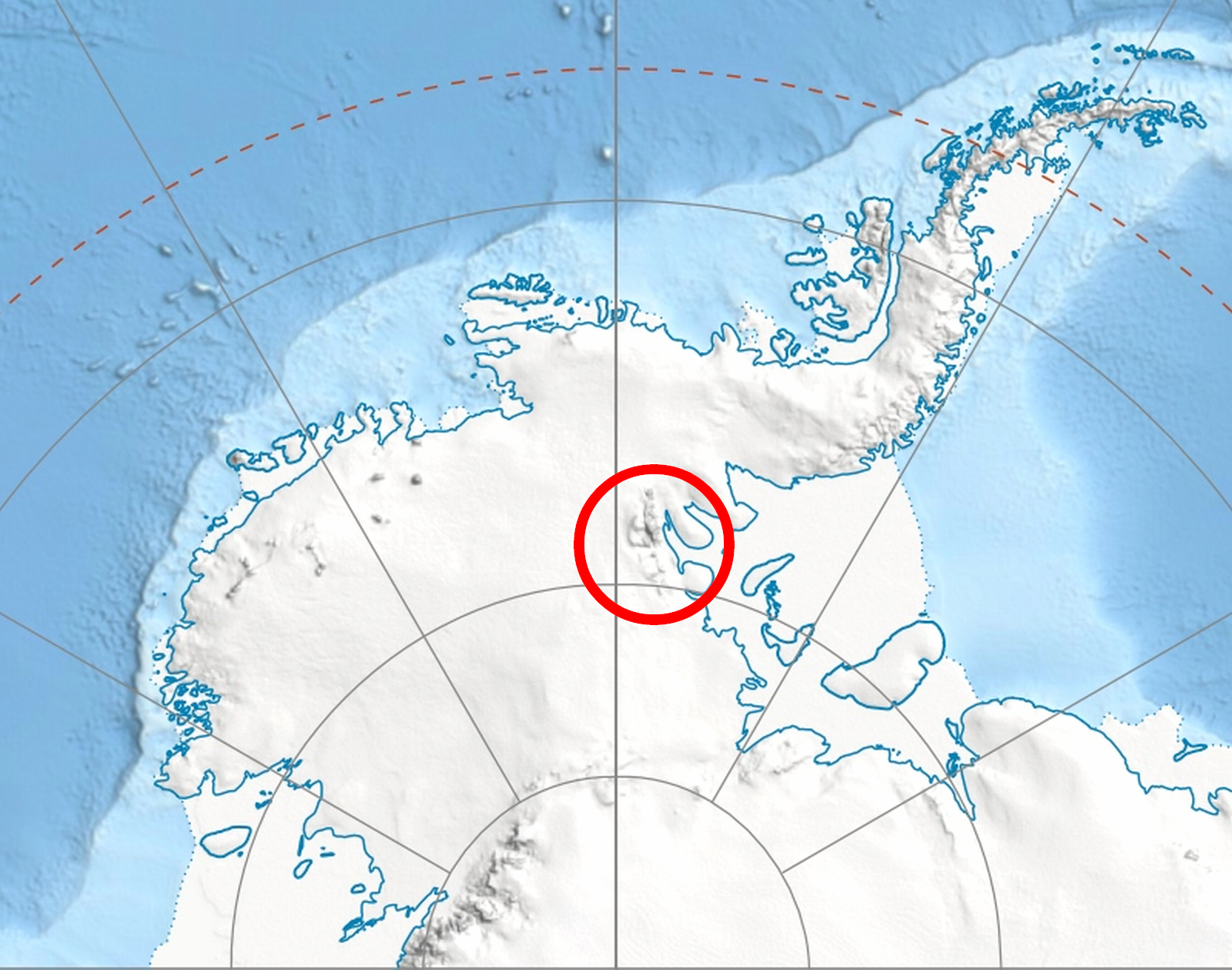
- Location of Ellsworth Mountains in Western Antarctica

- Location within Antarctica
- Type: tributary
- Location: Ellsworth Land
- Coordinates: 78°55′00″S 85°10′00″W
- Length: 40 nautical miles (74 km; 46 mi)
- Width: 5 nautical miles (9.3 km; 5.8 mi)
- Thickness: unknown
- Terminus: Minnesota Glacier
- Status: unknown

Sentinel Range map

The Nimitz Glacier is an Antarctic glacier, 40 nautical miles (74 km; 46 mi) long and 5 nautical miles (9.3 km; 5.8 mi) wide, draining the area about 10 nautical miles (19 km; 12 mi) west of the Vinson Massif and flowing southeast between the Sentinel Range and Bastien Range to enter Minnesota Glacier, in the central Ellsworth Mountains.

Discovered by USN Squadron VX-6 on photographic flights of 14–15 December 1959, and mapped by United States Geological Survey from these photos. Named by US-ACAN for Fleet Admiral Chester Nimitz, USN, who as Chief of Naval Operations at the time of Operation Highjump, 1946–1947, made possible that unprecedentedly large Antarctic expedition.

== Tributary glaciers ==
- Karasura Glacier
- Branscomb Glacier
- Cairns Glacier
- Tulaczyk Glacier
- Zapol Glacier
- Donnellan Glacier
- Gildea Glacier
- Bender Glacier
- Sirma Glacier

== See also ==
- List of glaciers in the Antarctic
- Glaciology

== Maps ==
- Vinson Massif. Scale 1:250 000 topographic map. Reston, Virginia: US Geological Survey, 1988.
- D. Gildea and C. Rada. Vinson Massif and the Sentinel Range. Scale 1:50 000 topographic map. Omega Foundation, 2007.
- Antarctic Digital Database (ADD). Scale 1:250000 topographic map of Antarctica. Scientific Committee on Antarctic Research (SCAR). Since 1993, regularly updated.
