= Mount Craddock =

Mountain in Ellsworth Land, Antarctica

Highest point
- Elevation: 4,368 m (14,331 ft)
- Coordinates: 78°38′S 85°12′W

Geography
- Location of Craddock Massif in Western Antarctica
- Location: Antarctica
- Parent range: Sentinel Range

Climbing
- First ascent: January 1992

Sentinel Range map

Mount Craddock is a large, bold mountain forming the south extremity of Craddock Massif in Sentinel Range, the ninth highest mountain in Antarctica. It is linked by Karnare Col to Mount Strybing in the southern Sentinel Range. The ninth-highest mountain in Antarctica was first climbed in January 1992.

The name Mount Craddock was originally recommended by the Advisory Committee on Antarctic Names (US-ACAN) in 1965 for the present-day Craddock Massif but subsequent maps limited Mount Craddock to the massif's southernmost peak, a position that became established over years. To avoid confusion and to fix the position of the name, US-ACAN redefined Mount Craddock in 2006 to apply to the southernmost peak described above.

The mountain was named by US-ACAN for J. Campbell Craddock (1930–2006), leader of a University of Minnesota expedition (1962–63) that made geological investigations and cartographic surveys in the Sentinel and Heritage Ranges of the Ellsworth Mountains. During 1960–61, Craddock led a Minnesota geological expedition in examining the Jones Mountains.

Mount Craddock is the second-highest point of the Craddock Massif which includes Mount Rutford (highest point), Rada Peak, and Bugueño Pinnacle. Rutford was named for R. H. Rutford, Antarctic geologist and colleague of Craddock. Rada Peak and Bugueño Pinnacle were named for Camilo Rada and Manuel Bugueño, climbing partners of Damien Gildea, a leading Antarctic researcher and climber.

== See also ==
- List of ultras of Antarctica

== Maps ==
- Vinson Massif. Scale 1:250 000 topographic map. Reston, Virginia: US Geological Survey, 1988.
- D. Gildea and C. Rada. Vinson Massif and the Sentinel Range. Scale 1:50 000 topographic map. Omega Foundation, 2007.
- Antarctic Digital Database (ADD). Scale 1:250000 topographic map of Antarctica. Scientific Committee on Antarctic Research (SCAR). Since 1993, regularly updated.
