= Bulgarian toponyms in Antarctica (M) =

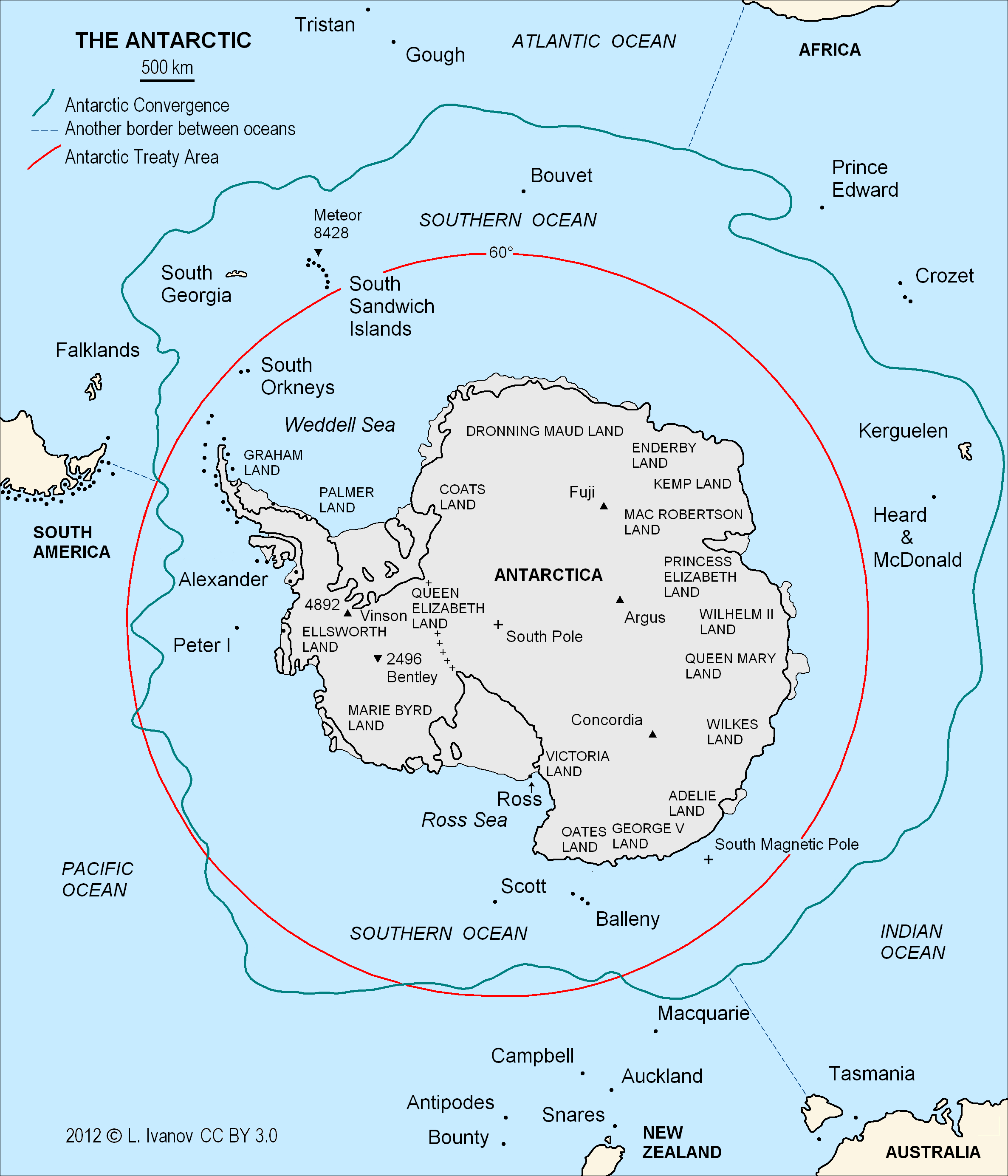
The South Polar Region.

- Macheret Trench, Livingston Island
- Machete Hook, Livingston Island
- Macrobius Cove, Graham Coast
- Madan Saddle, Smith Island
- Madara Peak, Livingston Island
- Madrid Dome, Oscar II Coast
- Madzharovo Point, Anvers Island
- Maglenik Heights, Sentinel Range
- Maglizh Rocks, Smith Island
- Magura Glacier, Livingston Island
- Makresh Rocks, Robert Island
- Malak Sechko Cove, Nelson Island
- Malamir Knoll, Greenwich Island
- Malasar Peak, Sentinel Range
- Maleshevo Cove, Livingston Island
- Malina Cove, Low Island
- Malkoch Peak, Sentinel Range
- Malorad Glacier, Trinity Peninsula
- Malyovitsa Crag, Livingston Island
- Mamarchev Peak, Sentinel Range
- Manastir Peak, Oscar II Coast
- Mancho Buttress, Trinity Peninsula
- Manole Pass, Sentinel Range
- Manolov Glacier, Alexander Island
- Marash Peak, Nordenskjöld Coast
- Marchaevo Peak, Oscar II Coast
- Marinka Point, Brabant Island
- Maritsa Peak, Livingston Island
- Markeli Point, Smith Island
- Marla Glacier, Trinity Peninsula
- Marmais Point, Trinity Peninsula
- Marsa Glacier, Sentinel Range
- Marten Crag, Trinity Peninsula
- Marvodol Glacier, Fallières Coast
- Maslarov Nunatak, Nordenskjöld Coast
- Masteyra Island, Anvers Island
- Mateev Cove, Livingston Island
- Mateev Point, Low Island
- Matochina Peak, Smith Island
- Matov Peak, Davis Coast
- Maystora Peak, Greenwich Island
- Meana Point, Nelson Island
- Mount Mecheva, Foyn Coast
- Mechit Buttress, Danco Coast
- Mechka Island, Wilhelm Archipelago
- Meda Nunatak, Foyn Coast
- Mediolana Bluff, Brabant Island
- Mednikarov Peak, Alexander Island
- Medovene Point, Smith Island
- Meduza Island, Wilhelm Archipelago
- Medven Glacier, Livingston Island
- Melanita Island, Trinity Island
- Meldia Rock, Nelson Island
- Melnik Peak, Livingston Island
- Melnik Ridge, Livingston Island
- Melta Point, Livingston Island
- Melyane Island, Livingston Island
- Memolli Nunatak, Sentinel Range
- Mendoza Cove, Elephant Island
- Mesta Peak, Livingston Island
- Metis Island, Biscoe Islands
- Metlichina Ridge, Oscar II Coast
- Mezdra Point, Snow Island
- Mezek Peak, Smith Island
- Mida Island, Wilhelm Archipelago
- Midzhur Peak, Sentinel Range
- Mihaylovski Cove, Livingston Island
- Mihaylovski Crag, Oscar II Coast
- Mihnevski Peak, Oscar II Coast
- Mikov Nunatak, Nordenskjöld Coast
- Mikre Beach, Snow Island
- Miladinovi Islets, Desolation Island
- Miletich Point, Greenwich Island
- Milev Rocks, Robert Island
- Milkov Point, Davis Coast
- Miller Spur, Danco Coast
- Mindya Cove, Tower Island
- Minzuhar Glacier, Oscar II Coast
- Mirovyane Peak, Sentinel Range
- Mishev Bluff, Liège Island
- Mishka Island, Wilhelm Archipelago
- Misionis Bay, Pickwick Island
- Mitev Glacier, Brabant Island
- Mitino Buttress, Graham Coast
- Mitkaloto Peak, Danco Coast
- Miziya Peak, Livingston Island
- Mneme Lake, Livingston Island
- Modev Peak, Two Hummock Island
- Modren Peak, Sentinel Range
- Mogilyane Peak, Trinity Peninsula
- Mokren Bight, Astrolabe Island
- Molerov Spur, Nordenskjöld Coast
- Momchil Peak, Greenwich Island
- Momino Point, Brabant Island
- Montana Bluff, Livingston Island
- Montemno Lake, Livingston Island
- Montojo Island, Biscoe Islands
- Monyak Hill, Sentinel Range
- Morava Peak, Trinity Peninsula
- Moriseni Peak, Alexander Island
- Mount Moriya, Nordenskjöld Coast
- Mostich Hill, Rugged Island
- Mozgovitsa Glacier, Alexander Island
- Mrahori Saddle, Nordenskjöld Coast
- Mraka Sound, Biscoe Islands
- Muevski Cove, Smith Island
- Mugla Passage, Livingston Island
- Muldava Glacier, Graham Coast
- Mundraga Bay, Nordenskjöld Coast
- Mureno Peak, Trinity Peninsula
- Murgash Glacier, Greenwich Island
- Mursalitsa Peak, Sentinel Range
- Musala Glacier, Greenwich Island
- Musina Glacier, Oscar II Coast

== See also ==
- Bulgarian toponyms in Antarctica

== Bibliography ==
- J. Stewart. Antarctica: An Encyclopedia. Jefferson, N.C. and London: McFarland, 2011. 1771 pp. ISBN 978-0-7864-3590-6
- L. Ivanov. Bulgarian Names in Antarctica. Sofia: Manfred Wörner Foundation, 2021. Second edition. 539 pp. ISBN 978-619-90008-5-4 (in Bulgarian)
- G. Bakardzhieva. Bulgarian toponyms in Antarctica. Paisiy Hilendarski University of Plovdiv: Research Papers. Vol. 56, Book 1, Part A, 2018 – Languages and Literature, pp. 104-119 (in Bulgarian)
- L. Ivanov and N. Ivanova. Bulgarian names. In: The World of Antarctica. Generis Publishing, 2022. pp. 114-115. ISBN 979-8-88676-403-1
