= Goreme Col =

Location of Sentinel Range in Western Antarctica.

Sentinel Range map.

Goreme Col (Bulgarian: Горемска седловина, ‘Goremska Sedlovina’ \go-'rem-ska se-dlo-vi-'na\) is the col of elevation 2666 m linking Doyran Heights to the east to Mount Mohl on the northeast side of Craddock Massif in Sentinel Range, Ellsworth Mountains in Antarctica. It is part of the glacial divide between Dater Glacier to the north and Thomas Glacier to the south.

The feature is named after the settlement of Goreme in Southwestern Bulgaria.

== Location ==
Goreme Col is centred at 78°32′00″S 85°01′30″W, which is 2.94 km northeast of Mount Mohl, 8.15 km east of Marts Peak, 8.66 km southeast of Vanand Peak, 4.65 km southwest of Mount Tuck and 1.47 km west by north of Prosenik Peak. US mapping in 1961, updated in 1988.

== Maps ==
- Vinson Massif. Scale 1:250 000 topographic map. Reston, Virginia: US Geological Survey, 1988.
- Antarctic Digital Database (ADD). Scale 1:250000 topographic map of Antarctica. Scientific Committee on Antarctic Research (SCAR). Since 1993, regularly updated.
