= Beloslav Peak =

Mountain in Antarctica

Location of Sentinel Range in Western Antarctica.

Sentinel Range map.

Beloslav Peak (Bulgarian: връх Белослав, romanized: vrah Beloslav, IPA: [ˈvrɤɣ bɛɫoˈsɫaf]) is the peak rising to 2016 m in Doyran Heights, southeast Sentinel Range in Ellsworth Mountains, Antarctica, and surmounting Guerrero Glacier to the southwest and Sikera Valley to the east.

The peak is named after the town of Beloslav in Northeastern Bulgaria.

== Location ==
Beloslav Peak is located at 78°29′34″S 84°29′43″W, which is 4.44 km southeast of Mount Havener, 8.37 km southwest of Gubesh Peak, 4.97 km northwest of Taylor Spur and 8.92 km northeast of McPherson Peak. US mapping in 1961, updated in 1988.

== See also ==
- Mountains in Antarctica

== Maps ==
- Vinson Massif. Scale 1:250 000 topographic map. Reston, Virginia: US Geological Survey, 1988.
- Antarctic Digital Database (ADD). Scale 1:250000 topographic map of Antarctica. Scientific Committee on Antarctic Research (SCAR). Since 1993, regularly updated.
