= Parangalitsa Peak =

Mountain in Ellsworth Land, Antarctica

Location of Sentinel Range in Western Antarctica.

Sentinel Range map.

Parangalitsa Peak (Bulgarian: връх Парангалица, romanized: vrah Parangalitsa, IPA: [ˈvrɤx pɐrɐŋˈɡalit͡sɐ]) is the rocky peak rising to 3037 m to form the south extremity of Veregava Ridge on the east side of Sentinel Range in Ellsworth Mountains, Antarctica. It is surmounting Dater Glacier to the west and its tributary Hansen Glacier to the east.

The feature is named after Parangalitsa Nature Reserve in Rila Mountain, Bulgaria.

== Location ==
Parangalitsa Peak is located at 78°29′27″S 85°00′25″W, which is 4 km southwest of Mount Waldron, 3.2 km west-northwest of Mount Tuck from which it is separated by Manole Pass, and 6.7 km east of Vanand Peak. US mapping in 1988.

== See also ==
- Mountains in Antarctica

== Maps ==
- Vinson Massif. Scale 1:250 000 topographic map. Reston, Virginia: US Geological Survey, 1988.
- Antarctic Digital Database (ADD). Scale 1:250000 topographic map of Antarctica. Scientific Committee on Antarctic Research (SCAR). Since 1993, regularly updated.
