= Manole Pass =

Location of Sentinel Range in Western Antarctica

Sentinel Range map

Manole Pass (Bulgarian: проход Маноле, ‘Prohod Manole’ \'pro-hod ma-'no-le\) is the ice-covered saddle of elevation 2,624 metres (8,609 ft) separating Veregava Ridge from Doyran Heights in the east foothills of Vinson Massif in Sentinel Range, Ellsworth Mountains in Antarctica. It is part of the glacial divide between the upper courses of Dater Glacier to the southwest and its tributary Hansen Glacier to the northeast.

The saddle is named after the settlement of Manole in Southern Bulgaria.

== Location ==
Manole Pass is centred at 78°30′12″S 84°58′21″W, which is 14.53 kilometres (9.03 mi) east-northeast of Mount Vinson, 7.8 kilometres (4.8 mi) east-southeast of Vanand Peak, 1.6 kilometres (0.99 mi) southeast of Parangalitsa Peak, 5 kilometres (3.1 mi) south by west of Mount Waldron, 2.08 kilometres (1.29 mi) west of Mount Tuck and 3.7 kilometres (2.3 mi) north of Prosenik Peak. US mapping in 1961, updated in 1988.

== Maps ==
- Vinson Massif. Scale 1:250 000 topographic map. Reston, Virginia: US Geological Survey, 1988.
- Antarctic Digital Database (ADD). Scale 1:250000 topographic map of Antarctica. Scientific Committee on Antarctic Research (SCAR). Since 1993, regularly updated.
