= Sipey Bluff =

Mountain in Antarctica

Location of Sentinel Range in Western Antarctica.

Sentinel Range map.

Sipey Bluff (Bulgarian: рид Сипей, romanized: rid Sipey, IPA: [ˈrid ˈsipɛj]) is the bluff rising to 2270 m in Veregava Ridge, central Sentinel Range in Ellsworth Mountains, Antarctica. It surmounts Orizari Glacier to the south-southwest, Dater Glacier to the west and north, and Berisad Glacier to the east.

The peak is named after the settlement of Sipey in Southern Bulgaria.

== Location ==
Sipey Bluff is located at 78°24′46″S 84°56′37″W, which is 5.26 km north of Mount Waldron, 9.46 km east by north of Mount Segers, 5.71 km south-southeast of Mount Farrell and 4.15 km northwest of Kushla Peak. US mapping in 1961, updated in 1988.

== Maps ==
- Vinson Massif. Scale 1:250 000 topographic map. Reston, Virginia: US Geological Survey, 1988.
- Antarctic Digital Database (ADD). Scale 1:250000 topographic map of Antarctica. Scientific Committee on Antarctic Research (SCAR). Since 1993, regularly updated.
