= Midzhur Peak (Antarctica) =

Mountain in Ellsworth Land, Antarctica

Location of Sentinel Range in Western Antarctica.

Sentinel Range map.

Midzhur Peak (Bulgarian: връх Миджур, romanized: vrah Midzhur, IPA: [ˈvrɤx miˈd͡ʒur]) is the peak rising to 1627 m in Doyran Heights, southeast Sentinel Range in Ellsworth Mountains, Antarctica, and surmounting Remington Glacier to the north and Obelya Glacier to the south.

The peak is named after Midzhur Peak in western Balkan Mountains.

== Location ==
Midzhur Peak is located at 78°35′34″S 84°24′26″W, which is 3.15 km East-northeast of Mount Benson, 7.91 km south-southwest of Taylor Spur and 3.6 km northwest of Johnson Spur. US mapping in 1961, updated in 1988.

== See also ==
- Mountains in Antarctica

== Maps ==
- Vinson Massif. Scale 1:250 000 topographic map. Reston, Virginia: US Geological Survey, 1988.
- Antarctic Digital Database (ADD). Scale 1:250000 topographic map of Antarctica. Scientific Committee on Antarctic Research (SCAR). Since 1993, regularly updated.
