= Gubesh Peak =

Mountain in Antarctica

Location of Sentinel Range in Western Antarctica.

Sentinel Range map.

Gubesh Peak (Bulgarian: връх Губеш, romanized: vrah Gubesh, IPA: [ˈvrɤɣ ˈɡubɛʃ]) is the peak rising to 1407 m in Flowers Hills, Sentinel Range in Ellsworth Mountains, Antarctica. It surmounts Rutford Ice Stream to the east and Sikera Valley to the west.

The peak is named after the settlement of Gubesh in Western Bulgaria.

== Location ==
Gubesh Peak is located at 78°27′24″S 84°09′58″W, which is 11.29 km east by north of Mount Havener, 13.95 km south-southeast of Dickey Peak and 13.4 km northwest of Batil Spur, and 8.31 km northeast of Taylor Spur in Doyran Heights. US mapping in 1961, updated in 1988.

== See also ==
- Mountains in Antarctica

== Maps ==
- Vinson Massif. Scale 1:250 000 topographic map. Reston, Virginia: US Geological Survey, 1988.
- Antarctic Digital Database (ADD). Scale 1:250000 topographic map of Antarctica. Scientific Committee on Antarctic Research (SCAR). Since 1993, regularly updated.
