= Kostinbrod Pass =

Location of Sentinel Range in Western Antarctica.

Sentinel Range map.

Kostinbrod Pass (Bulgarian: Костинбродски проход, ‘Kostinbrodski Prohod’ \'ko-stin-brod-ski 'pro-hod\) is the ice-covered saddle of elevation 1417 m separating Doyran Heights from Flowers Hills in Sentinel Range, Ellsworth Mountains in Antarctica. It is part of the glacial divide between Valoga Glacier and Sikera Valley.

The pass is named after the town of Kostinbrod in Western Bulgaria.

== Location ==
Kostinbrod Pass is centred at 78°25′59″S 84°28′19″W, which is 6.16 km northeast of Mount Havener, 9.53 km south of Dickey Peak and 7.32 km west-northwest of Gubesh Peak. US mapping in 1961, updated in 1988.

== Maps ==
- Vinson Massif. Scale 1:250 000 topographic map. Reston, Virginia: US Geological Survey, 1988.
- Antarctic Digital Database (ADD). Scale 1:250000 topographic map of Antarctica. Scientific Committee on Antarctic Research (SCAR). Since 1993, regularly updated.
