= Kushla Peak =

Mountain in Antarctica

Location of Sentinel Range in Western Antarctica.

Sentinel Range map.

Kushla Peak (Bulgarian: връх Кушла, romanized: vrah Kushla, IPA: [ˈvrɤx ˈkuʃɫɐ]) is the peak rising to 2588 m in Veregava Ridge, central Sentinel Range in Ellsworth Mountains, Antarctica. It surmounts Berisad Glacier to the north-northwest and Hansen Glacier to the southeast.

The peak is named after the settlement of Kushla in Southern Bulgaria.

== Location ==
Kushla Peak is located at 78°26′16″S 84°48′23″W, which is 3.53 km northeast of Mount Waldron, 4.15 km southeast of Sipey Bluff, 12.58 km southwest of Dickey Peak and 4.95 km northwest of Mount Havener. US mapping in 1961, updated in 1988.

== See also ==
- Mountains in Antarctica

== Maps ==
- Vinson Massif. Scale 1:250 000 topographic map. Reston, Virginia: US Geological Survey, 1988.
