= Nebeska Peak =

Mountain in Ellsworth Land, Antarctica

Location of Sentinel Range in Western Antarctica.

Sentinel Range map.

Nebeska Peak (Bulgarian: връх Небеска, romanized: vrah Nebeska, IPA: [ˈvrɤx nɛˈbɛskɐ]) is the rocky peak rising to 2450 m in Sullivan Heights on the east side of Sentinel Range in Ellsworth Mountains, Antarctica. It is surmounting Pulpudeva Glacier to the north and Hinkley Glacier to the south.

The feature is named after the settlement of Nebeska in southern Bulgaria.

== Location ==
Nebeska Peak is located at 78°23′01″S 85°11′16″W, which is 3.85 km west-southwest of Mount Farrell, 10.45 km northwest of Mount Waldron, 6.17 km northeast of Mount Segers, and 9.7 km east-southeast of Mount Bearskin. US mapping in 1988, and SCAR Antarctic Digital Database mapping in 2012.

== See also ==
- Mountains in Antarctica

== Maps ==
- Vinson Massif. Scale 1:250 000 topographic map. Reston, Virginia: US Geological Survey, 1988.
- Antarctic Digital Database (ADD). Scale 1:250000 topographic map of Antarctica. Scientific Committee on Antarctic Research (SCAR). Since 1993, regularly updated.
