= Toros Peak =

Mountain in Antarctica

Location of Sentinel Range in Western Antarctica.

Sentinel Range map.

Toros Peak (Bulgarian: връх Торос, romanized: vrah Toros, IPA: [ˈvrɤx toˈrɔs]) is the rocky twin summit peak rising to 2961 m in Zinsmeister Ridge on the northeast side of Vinson Massif in Sentinel Range, Ellsworth Mountains in Antarctica, and surmounting Dater Glacier to the east and its tributary Hinkley Glacier to the northwest.

The peak is named after the settlement of Toros in Northern Bulgaria.

== Location ==
Toros Peak is located at 78°28′03″S 85°14′55″W, which is 1.66 km northeast of Vanand Peak, 5.16 km south-southeast of Mount Segers and 7.38 km west of Mount Waldron. US mapping in 1961, updated in 1988.

== Maps ==
- Vinson Massif. Scale 1:250 000 topographic map. Reston, Virginia: US Geological Survey, 1988.
- D. Gildea and C. Rada. Vinson Massif and the Sentinel Range. Scale 1:50 000 topographic map. Omega Foundation, 2007.
- Antarctic Digital Database (ADD). Scale 1:250000 topographic map of Antarctica. Scientific Committee on Antarctic Research (SCAR). Since 1993, regularly updated.
