= Vranya Pass =

Location of Sentinel Range in Western Antarctica.

Sentinel Range map.

Vranya Pass (Bulgarian: проход Враня, ‘Prohod Vranya’ \'pro-hod 'vra-nya\) is the ice-covered saddle of elevation 2100 m separating Sullivan Heights from Vinson Massif in Sentinel Range, Ellsworth Mountains in Antarctica. It is part of the glacial divide between Crosswell Glacier to the northwest and Hinkley Glacier to the east.

The saddle is named after the settlement of Vranya in Southwestern Bulgaria.

== Location ==
Vranya Pass is centred at 78°26′33″S 85°21′30″W, which is 10.9 km northeast of Mount Vinson, 8.51 km east of Mount Shinn, 1.74 km south of Mount Segers, 4.2 km north-northwest of Vanand Peak and 9.98 km west-northwest of Mount Waldron. US mapping in 1961, updated in 1988.

== Maps ==
- Vinson Massif. Scale 1:250 000 topographic map. Reston, Virginia: US Geological Survey, 1988.
- Antarctic Digital Database (ADD). Scale 1:250000 topographic map of Antarctica. Scientific Committee on Antarctic Research (SCAR). Since 1993, regularly updated.
