= Batil Spur =

Ridge in the Ellsworth Mountains, Antarctica

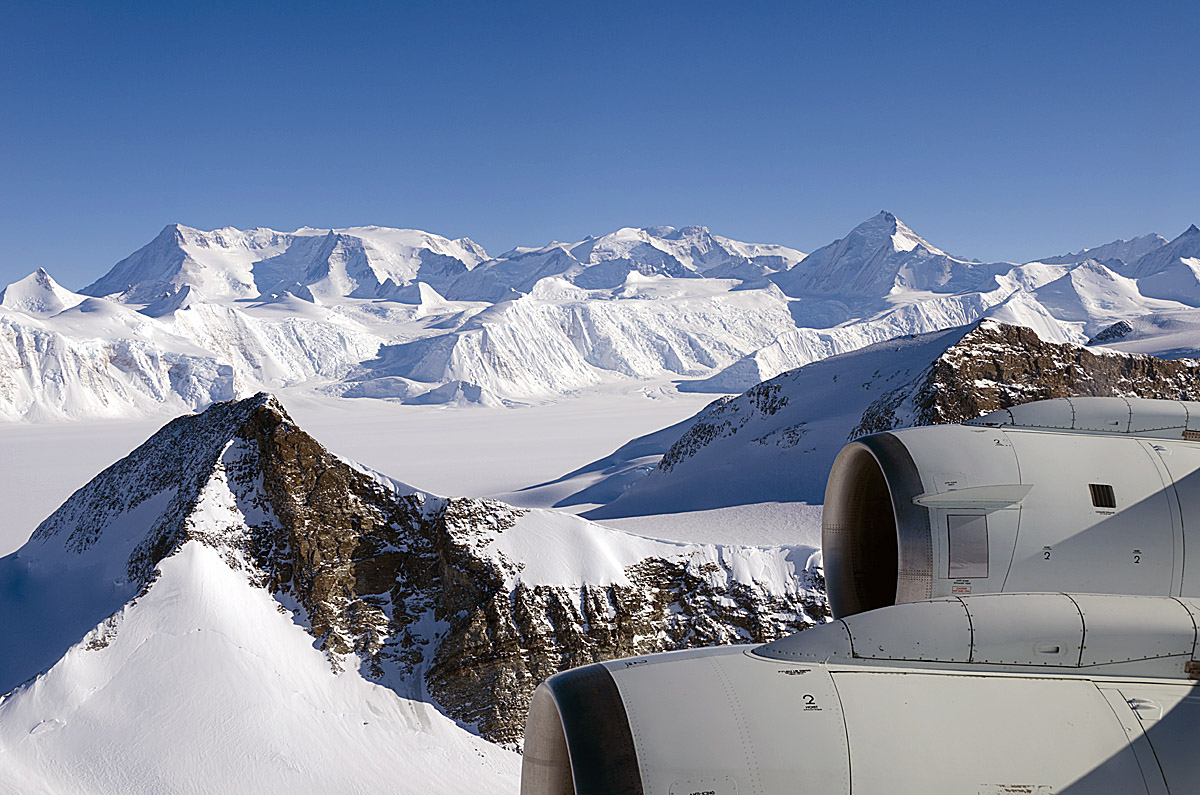
Central Sentinel Range from above Rutford Ice Stream, with Batil Spur in the foreground

Location of Sentinel Range in West Antarctica

USGS map of Sentinel Range

Batil Spur (Bulgarian: Батилов рид, ‘Batilov Rid’ \ba-'ti-lov 'rid\) is the rocky ridge extending 3.9 km and 1.3 km wide, forming the southeast extremity of Flowers Hills on the east side of Sentinel Range in Ellsworth Mountains. It surmounts Rutford Ice Stream to the east and the ends of its tributaries flowing from Sikera Valley and Doyran Heights to the west.

The peak is named after the medieval fortress of Batil in Western Bulgaria.

== Location ==
Batil Spur's southernmost height of elevation 626.5 m is located at 78°32′43″S 83°45′36″W, which is 13.4 km southeast of Gubesh Peak, 21 km north-northeast of Long Peak in Petvar Heights, and 13.3 km northeast of Johnson Spur and 13.07 km east-southeast of Taylor Spur in Doyran Heights. US mapping in 1961 and 1988.

== Maps ==
- Vinson Massif. Scale 1:250 000 topographic map. Reston, Virginia: US Geological Survey, 1988.
- Antarctic Digital Database (ADD). Scale 1:250000 topographic map of Antarctica. Scientific Committee on Antarctic Research (SCAR). Since 1993, regularly updated.
