= Flowers Hills =

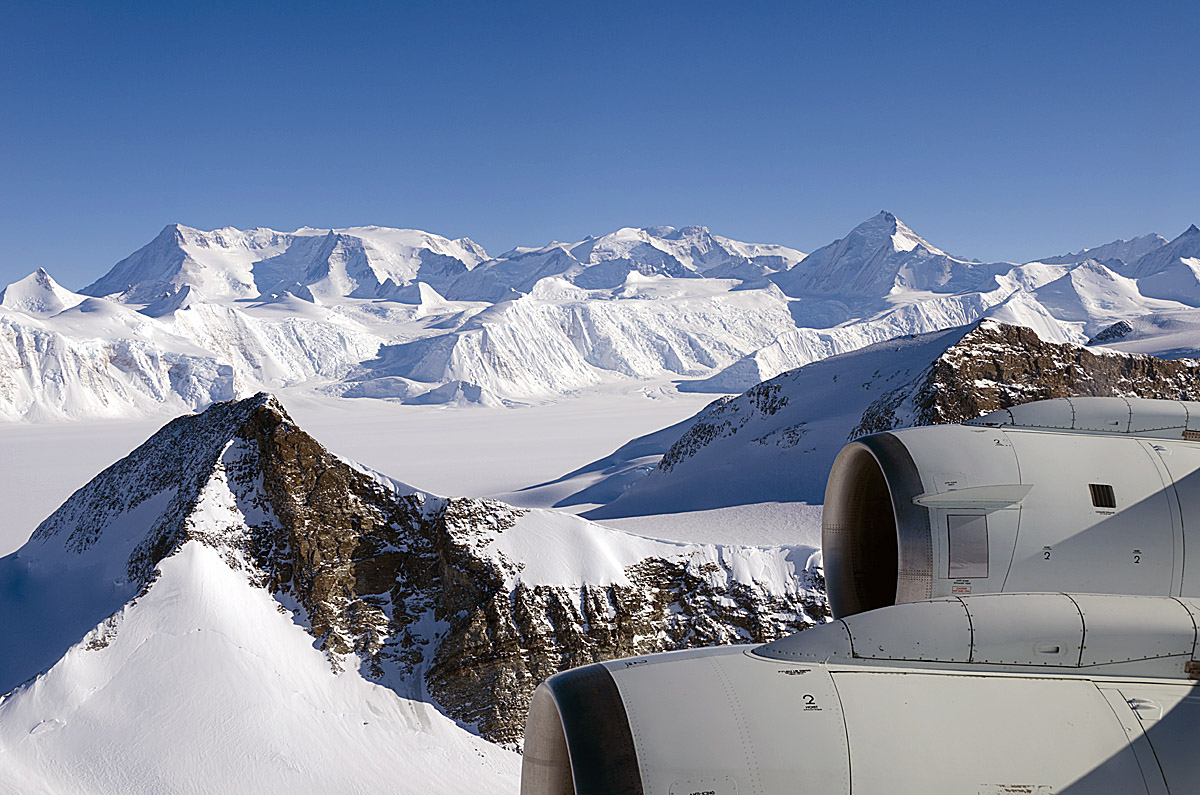
Central Sentinel Range from above Rutford Ice Stream, with south extremity of Flowers Hills in the foreground, Sikera Valley and Doyran Heights in the middle, and Craddock Massif and Vinson Plateau in the left background

Location of Sentinel Range in Western Antarctica.

Sentinel Range map.

The Flowers Hills (78°24′S 84°10′W) are a triangular shaped group of hills, 34.6 kilometres (21.5 mi) long and 11.5 kilometres (7.1 mi) wide, with peaks of 1,240 metres (4,070 ft) (Gubesh Peak) and 1,504 metres (4,934 ft) (Dickey Peak), extending along the eastern edge of the Sentinel Range, Ellsworth Mountains, Antarctica. The hills are bounded by Hansen Glacier and Dater Glacier to the west and north, Rutford Ice Stream to the east and Sikera Valley to the southwest, and separated from Doyran Heights to the west-southwest by Kostinbrod Pass. Their interior is drained by Lardeya Ice Piedmont and Valoga Glacier.

The hills were first mapped by the United States Geological Survey from surveys and U.S. Navy air photos, 1957–59, and were named by the Advisory Committee on Antarctic Names for Edwin C. Flowers, a meteorologist at the South Pole Station in 1957.

== Maps ==
- Vinson Massif. Scale 1:250 000 topographic map. Reston, Virginia: US Geological Survey, 1988.
- Antarctic Digital Database (ADD). Scale 1:250000 topographic map of Antarctica. Scientific Committee on Antarctic Research (SCAR). Since 1993, regularly updated.

== Features ==
Geographical features include:

- Batil Spur
- Dater Glacier
- Dickey Peak
- Gubesh Peak
- Hansen Glacier
- Kostinbrod Pass
- Lardeya Ice Piedmont
- Monyak Hill
- Rutford Ice Stream
- Sikera Valley
- Strinava Glacier
- Taylor Spur
- Valoga Glacier
