= Levack =

Levack is a surname. Notable people with the name include:

- Ian Levack Aitken (1927–2018), British journalist and political commentator
- Alex Levack (born 1944), Israeli photojournalist and street photographer
- Brian P. Levack (born 1943), American historian of early modern Britain and Europe
- Chandler Levack, Canadian writer, director, and filmmaker
- Herbert T. Levack (1916–2010), command pilot in the U.S. Air Force
- Simon Levack (born 1965), British author of historical mystery novels

== See also ==
- Levack railway station, Canadian passenger station
- Mount Levack, mountain in Sullivan Heights, Sentinel Range, Antarctica
- Levack, Ontario, town in the Canadian province of Ontario from 1973 to 2000
- Onaping - Levack, Ontario, unincorporated community in Ontario, Canada
