= Prosenik Peak =

Mountain in Antarctica

Location of Sentinel Range in Western Antarctica.

Sentinel Range map.

Prosenik Peak (Bulgarian: връх Просеник, romanized: vrah Prosenik, IPA: [ˈvrɤx prosɛˈnik]) is the peak rising to 2739 m in Doyran Heights, southeast Sentinel Range in Ellsworth Mountains, Antarctica, and surmounting Thomas Glacier to the southeast and Hough Glacier to the east-northeast.

The peak is named after the settlement of Prosenik in Eastern Bulgaria.

== Location ==
Prosenik Peak is located at 78°32′11″S 84°57′38″W, which is 4.75 km north-northeast of Elfring Peak, 3.78 km northeast of Mount Mohl, 4.12 km south-southwest of Mount Tuck and 4.45 km west-northwest of McPherson Peak. US mapping in 1961, updated in 1988.

== See also ==
- Mountains in Antarctica

== Maps ==
- Vinson Massif. Scale 1:250 000 topographic map. Reston, Virginia: US Geological Survey, 1988.
- Antarctic Digital Database (ADD). Scale 1:250000 topographic map of Antarctica. Scientific Committee on Antarctic Research (SCAR). Since 1993, regularly updated.
