= Moniak =

Moniak may refer to:

- Mickey Moniak (born 1998), American baseball player
- Moniak, leader of the Golden Horde at the 1470 Battle of Lipnic
- Anhelina Moniak, contestant on season 2 of The Voice of Ukraine (Голос країни)
- Ted Moniak, guitarist for Leisure Class (band)

== See also ==
- Moniaki, Urzędów, Kraśnik, Lublin, Poland
- Moniaki-Kolonia, Urzędów, Kraśnik, Lublin, Poland
- Moniac (disambiguation)
- Moniack (disambiguation)
- Monyak Hill
- Monjack
