= Moniac =

MONIAC or Moniac may refer to:

- MONIAC, a hydraulic economics computer
- Moniac, Georgia, an unincorporated community
- David Moniac (1802–1836), an American military officer
- Hildegard Moniac (1891–1967), German educator and political activist
- a fan of softball player Monica Abbott

== See also ==
- Moniak (disambiguation)
- Moniack (disambiguation)
- Monyak Hill, Antarctica
- Monjack
