= Mount Tuck =

Mountain in Antarctica

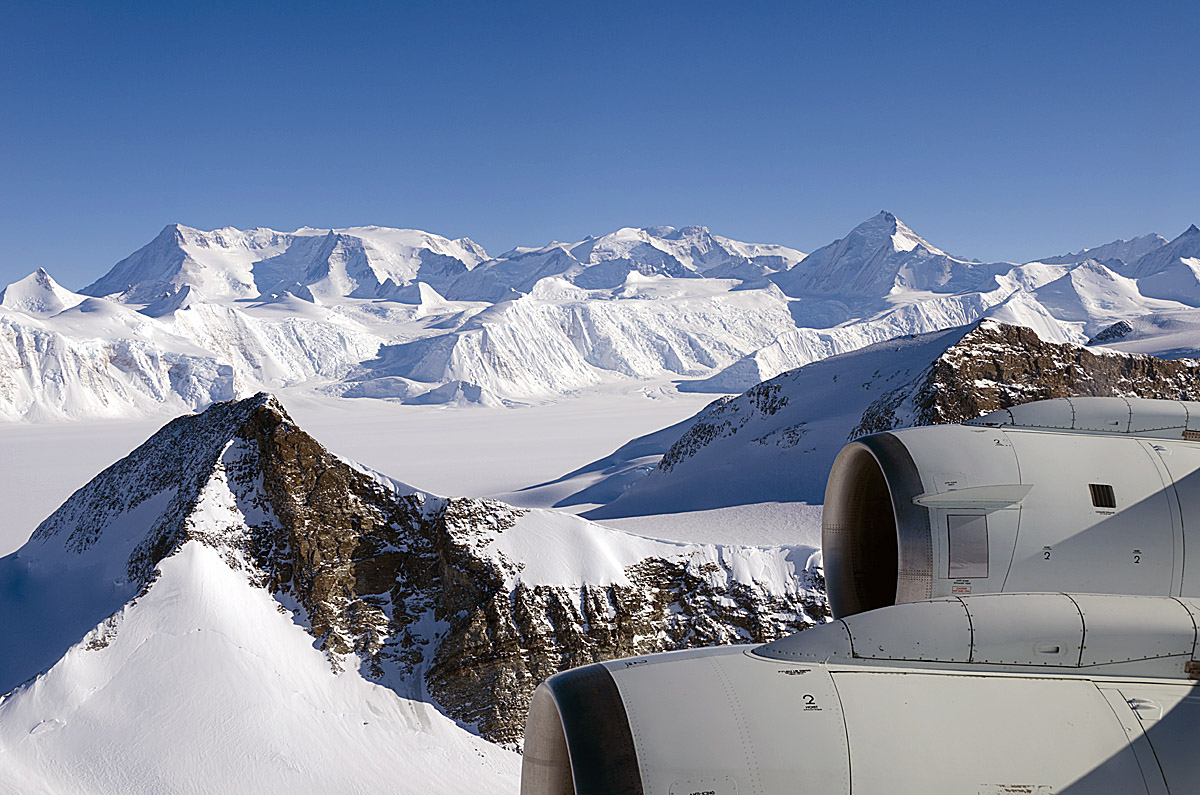
Central Sentinel Range from above Rutford Ice Stream, with Flowers Hills in the foreground, Sikera Valley and Doyran Heights in the middle with Mount Tuck on the right, and Craddock Massif and Vinson Plateau in the left background

Location of Sentinel Range in West Antarctica

USGS map of Sentinel Range

Mount Tuck (78°29′S 84°50′W) is a pyramidal mountain (3,560 m) at the head of Hansen Glacier, the summit of Doyran Heights in the Sentinel Range of Ellsworth Mountains, Antarctica. It surmounts Hansen Glacier to the north, Hough Glacier to the south and upper Dater Glacier to the west, and separated from Veregava Ridge to the northwest by Manole Pass.

The peak was first mapped by the United States Geological Survey (USGS) from surveys and U.S. Navy air photos from 1957 to 1959. It was named by the Advisory Committee on Antarctic Names (US-ACAN) for Lieutenant John Tuck Jr., a U.S. Navy support leader at the South Pole Station in 1957.

== Maps ==
- Vinson Massif. Scale 1:250 000 topographic map. Reston, Virginia: US Geological Survey, 1988.
- Antarctic Digital Database (ADD). Scale 1:250000 topographic map of Antarctica. Scientific Committee on Antarctic Research (SCAR). Since 1993, regularly updated.
