= Moniack =

Moniack may refer to:

- Moniack Castle, Highland, Scotland, UK; a 16th-century tower house and listed building
- Moniack Burn, Highland, Scotland, UK; a small river, a burn
- Moniack Mhor (Great Moniack), Highland, Scotland, UK; a creative writing centre
- Moniack, Inverness, Highland, Scotland, UK; a locale in Inverness postal code; see IV postcode area
- Moniack Gorge, Inverness, Highland, Scotland, UK; a protected area; see List of Sites of Special Scientific Interest in Inverness

== See also ==
- Moniac (disambiguation)
- Moniak (disambiguation)
- Monyak Hill, Antarctica
- Monjack
