= Strinava Glacier =

Glacier in Antarctica

- Location of Sentinel Range in Western Antarctica.

- Location within Antarctica
- Location: Ellsworth Mountains; Marie Byrd Land
- Coordinates: 78°20′50″S 84°51′10″W
- Length: 3.7 nmi (7 km; 4 mi)
- Width: 1.8 nmi (3 km; 2 mi)
- Thickness: unknown
- Status: unknown

Sentinel Range map.

Strinava Glacier (Bulgarian: ледник Стринава, romanized: lednik Strinava, IPA: [ˈlɛdnik striˈnavɐ]) is the 6 km long and 3 km wide glacier in Sullivan Heights on the east side of Sentinel Range in Ellsworth Mountains, Antarctica. It is draining the northeast slopes of Mount Farrell and the southeast slopes of the ridge of Mount Levack, and flowing eastwards from Zmeevo Pass to join Dater Glacier west of Dickey Peak in Flowers Hills.

The feature is named after the medieval fortress of Strinava in northern Bulgaria.

== Location ==
Strinava Glacier is located at 78°20′50″S 84°51′10″W. US mapping in 1988.

== See also ==
- List of glaciers in the Antarctic
- Glaciology

== Maps ==
- Vinson Massif. Scale 1:250 000 topographic map. Reston, Virginia: US Geological Survey, 1988.
- Antarctic Digital Database (ADD). Scale 1:250000 topographic map of Antarctica. Scientific Committee on Antarctic Research (SCAR). Since 1993, regularly updated.
