= Zinsmeister Ridge =

Coordinates: 78°27′00″S 85°15′00″W

Location of Sentinel Range in Western Antarctica.

Sentinel Range map.

Zinsmeister Ridge is the high, rugged mountain ridge, 9 mi long, running northeast from Schoening Peak, Vinson Massif in the Sentinel Range, Antarctica. Jagged 2000 to 3000 m peaks including Vanand and Toros Peaks surmount the ridge, which separates Hinkley Glacier from the upper part of Dater Glacier.

The ridge is named by US-ACAN (2006) after William J. Zinsmeister, Department of Earth and Atmospheric Sciences, Purdue University, USAP researcher of the paleontology (molluscan fauna) of Seymour Island, 1975–95.

== Maps ==
- Vinson Massif. Scale 1:250 000 topographic map. Reston, Virginia: US Geological Survey, 1988.
- D. Gildea and C. Rada. Vinson Massif and the Sentinel Range. Scale 1:50 000 topographic map. Omega Foundation, 2007.
- Antarctic Digital Database (ADD). Scale 1:250000 topographic map of Antarctica. Scientific Committee on Antarctic Research (SCAR). Since 1993, regularly updated.
