= Machete Hook =

Antarctic spit

Location of Livingston Island in the South Shetland Islands and Antarctica

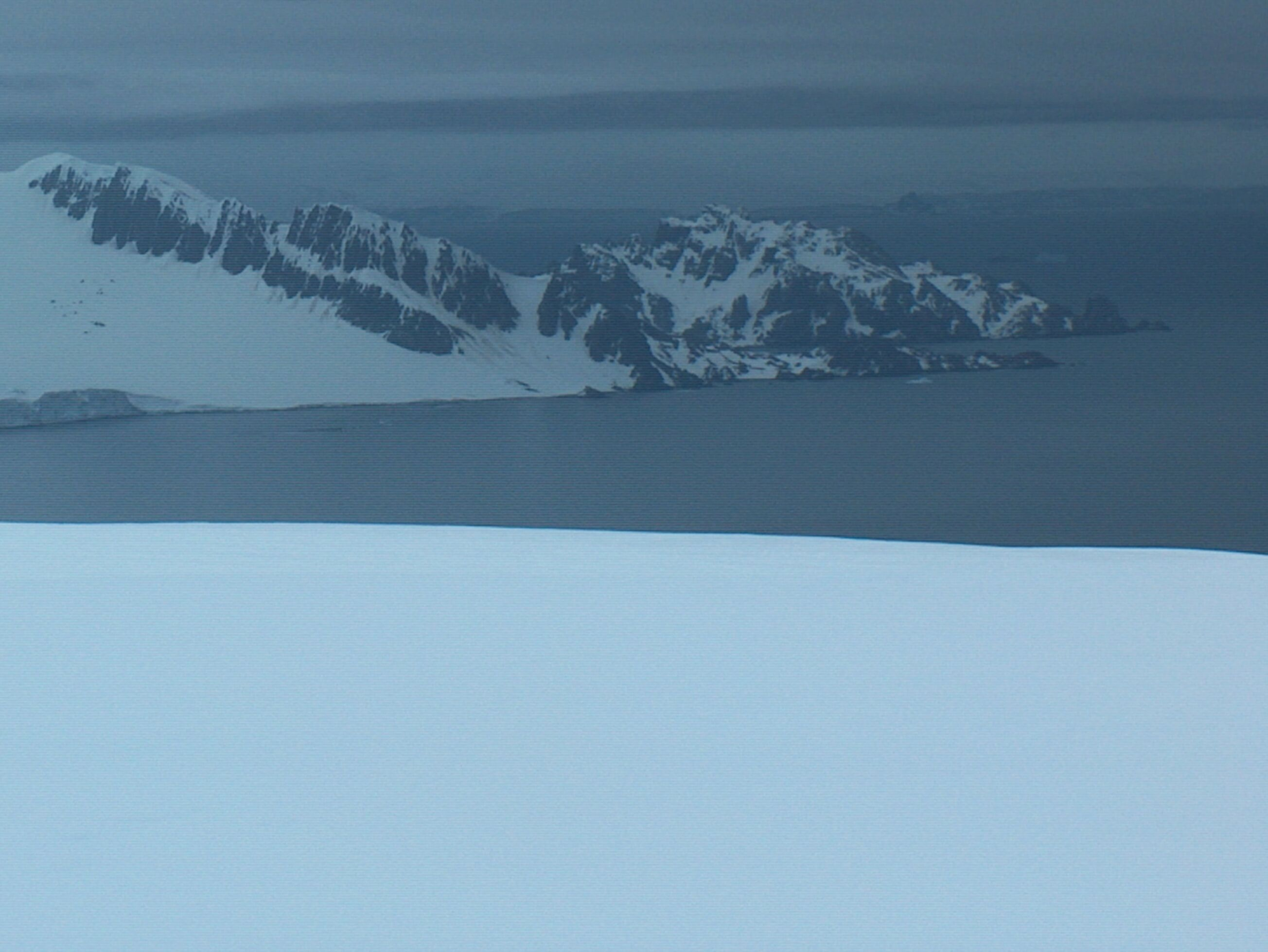
Vasilev Bay from Leslie Gap, with Melta Point and Machete Hook in the background

Topographic map of Livingston Island and Smith Island

Machete Hook (Bulgarian: коса Мачетето, romanized: kosa Macheteto, IPA: [ko'sa mɐ't͡ʃɛtɛto]) is the low-tide elevation spit wide 70 m and projecting from the small peninsula ending in Siddins Point 830 m eastwards into Vasilev Bay in Hero Bay on the north coast of Livingston Island in the South Shetland Islands, Antarctica. Bulgarian topographic survey Tangra 2004/05. The area was visited by early 19th century sealers.

The feature is so named because of its shape supposedly resembling a machete.

== Location ==
Machete Hook is centred at 62°33′16″S 60°22′47″W, which is 1.5 km southeast of Melta Point and 7.7 km southwest of Bezmer Point. British mapping in 1968 and Bulgarian in 2009 and 2017.

== Maps ==
- Livingston Island to King George Island. Scale 1:200000. Admiralty Nautical Chart 1776. Taunton: UK Hydrographic Office, 1968
- South Shetland Islands. Scale 1:200000 topographic map No. 3373. DOS 610 - W 62 58. Tolworth, UK, 1968
- L. Ivanov. Antarctica: Livingston Island and Greenwich, Robert, Snow and Smith Islands. Scale 1:120000 topographic map. Troyan: Manfred Wörner Foundation, 2010. ISBN 978-954-92032-9-5 (First edition 2009. ISBN 978-954-92032-6-4)
- L. Ivanov. Antarctica: Livingston Island and Smith Island. Scale 1:100000 topographic map. Manfred Wörner Foundation, 2017. ISBN 978-619-90008-3-0
- Antarctic Digital Database (ADD). Scale 1:250000 topographic map of Antarctica. Scientific Committee on Antarctic Research (SCAR). Since 1993, regularly upgraded and updated
