= Zmeevo Pass =

Mountain pass in Antarctica

Location of Sentinel Range in Western Antarctica.

Sentinel Range map.

Zmeevo Pass (Bulgarian: проход Змеево, ‘Prohod Zmeevo’ \'pro-hod 'zme-e-vo\) is the ice-covered saddle of elevation 2110 m in Sullivan Heights on the east side of Sentinel Range in Ellsworth Mountains, Antarctica separating Mount Farrell from the ridge of Mount Levack. It is part of the glacial divide between Pulpudeva Glacier and Strinava Glacier.

The feature is named after the settlement of Zmeevo in northeastern and Zmeyovo in southern Bulgaria.

== Location ==
Zmeevo Pass is located at 78°21′29″S 85°03′25″W, which is 1.1 km north-northwest of Mount Farrell and 3.35 km south of Mount Levack. US mapping in 1988.

== Maps ==
- Vinson Massif. Scale 1:250 000 topographic map. Reston, Virginia: US Geological Survey, 1988.
- Antarctic Digital Database (ADD). Scale 1:250000 topographic map of Antarctica. Scientific Committee on Antarctic Research (SCAR). Since 1993, regularly updated.
