= Monyak Hill =

Location of Sentinel Range in Western Antarctica

Sentinel Range map featuring Monyak Hill

Monyak Hill (Bulgarian: хълм Моняк, ‘Halm Monyak’ \'h&lm 'mo-nyak\) is the rocky hill rising to 864 m at the north extremity of Flowers Hills on the east side of Sentinel Range in Ellsworth Mountains, Antarctica. It surmounts Dater Glacier to the west, Ellen Glacier to the north, and Lardeya Ice Piedmont to the east.

The feature is named after the medieval fortress of Monyak in southern Bulgaria.

== Location ==
Monyak Hill is located at 78°18′28″S 84°30′29″W, which is 4.6 km north of Dickey Peak, 12.75 km east-northeast of Mount Levack in Sullivan Heights, and 11.2 km south-southeast of Mount Besch in Barnes Ridge. US mapping in 1988.

== Maps ==
- Vinson Massif. Scale 1:250 000 topographic map. Reston, Virginia: US Geological Survey, 1988.
- Antarctic Digital Database (ADD). Scale 1:250000 topographic map of Antarctica. Scientific Committee on Antarctic Research (SCAR). Since 1993, regularly updated.
