= Doyran Heights =

Antarctic Heights

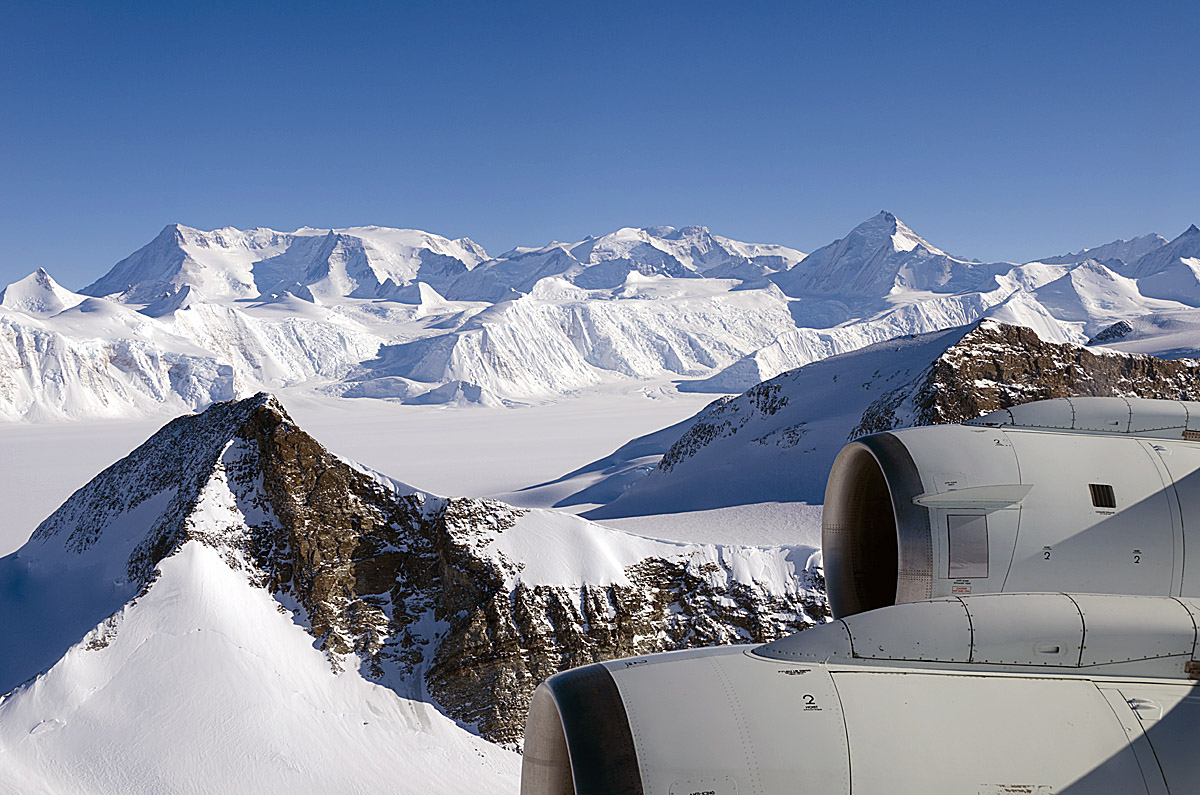
Central Sentinel Range from above Rutford Ice Stream, with Flowers Hills in the foreground, Sikera Valley and Doyran Heights in the middle, and Craddock Massif and Vinson Plateau in the left background

Location of Sentinel Range in West Antarctica

USGS map of Sentinel Range

Doyran Heights (Bulgarian: Дойрански възвишения, romanized: Doyranski Vazvisheniya, IPA: [ˈdɔjrɐnski vɐzviˈʃɛnijɐ]) are the heights rising to 3473 m at Mount Tuck in the east foothills of Vinson Massif and Craddock Massif in Sentinel Range, Ellsworth Mountains in Antarctica, extending 30.8 km in north–south direction and 16.5 km in east–west direction. They are bounded by Thomas Glacier to the south and southwest, Dater Glacier and Hansen Glacier to the northwest and north, and Sikera Valley to the east, linked to Craddock Massif to the west by Goreme Col, and separated from Veregava Ridge to the north by Manole Pass and from Flowers Hills to the northeast by Kostinbrod Pass. Their interior is drained by Guerrero, Hough, Remington and Obelya Glaciers.

The heights are named after the settlements of Doyrantsi in Northeastern and Southern Bulgaria.

== Location ==
Doyran Heights are centred at 78°32′30″S 84°37′00″W. US mapping in 1961, updated in 1988.

== See also ==
- Mountains in Antarctica

Geographical features include:

- Beloslav Peak
- Goreme Col
- Guerrero Glacier
- Hansen Glacier
- Hough Glacier
- Johnson Spur
- Kostinbrod Pass
- Manole Pass
- McPherson Peak
- Midzhur Peak
- Mount Benson
- Mount Havener
- Mount Mohl
- Mount Tuck
- Prosenik Peak
- Remington Glacier
- Sikera Valley
- Taylor Spur

== Maps ==
- Vinson Massif. Scale 1:250 000 topographic map. Reston, Virginia: US Geological Survey, 1988.
- Antarctic Digital Database (ADD). Scale 1:250000 topographic map of Antarctica. Scientific Committee on Antarctic Research (SCAR). Since 1993, regularly updated.
