= Podem Peak =

Mountain in Antarctica

Location of Brabant Island in the Antarctic Peninsula region.

Podem Peak (Bulgarian: връх Подем, romanized: vrah Podem, IPA: [ˈvrɤx poˈdɛm]) is the ice-covered peak of elevation 875 m in the southeast part of Basarbovo Ridge in Stribog Mountains on Brabant Island in the Palmer Archipelago, Antarctica. It has steep and partly ice-free south slopes, and surmounts Malpighi Glacier to the southwest and Svetovrachene Glacier to the northeast.

The peak is named after the settlement of Podem in Northern Bulgaria.

== Location ==
Podem Peak is located at 64°16′37″S 62°12′22″W, which is 3.23 km southeast of Mediolana Bluff, 4.54 km southwest of Einthoven Hill, and 2.7 km west-northwest of Bov Point formed by an offshoot of the peak. British mapping in 1980 and 2008.

== Maps ==
- Antarctic Digital Database (ADD). Scale 1:250000 topographic map of Antarctica. Scientific Committee on Antarctic Research (SCAR). Since 1993, regularly upgraded and updated.

== Notes ==
- British Antarctic Territory. Scale 1:200000 topographic map. DOS 610 Series, Sheet W 64 62. Directorate of Overseas Surveys, Tolworth, UK, 1980.
- Brabant Island to Argentine Islands. Scale 1:250000 topographic map. British Antarctic Survey, 2008.
