= Valoga Glacier =

Glacier in Antarctica

- Location of Sentinel Range in Western Antarctica.

- Location within Antarctica
- Location: Sentinel Range
- Coordinates: 78°24′30″S 84°28′00″W
- Length: 8 nmi (15 km; 9 mi)
- Thickness: unknown
- Status: unknown

Sentinel Range map.

Valoga Glacier (Bulgarian: ледник Валога, romanized: lednik Valoga, IPA: [ˈlɛdniɡ vɐˈɫɔɡɐ]) is the glacier extending 8 km in southwest-northeast direction and 4 km in southeast-northwest direction in Flowers Hills on the east side of Sentinel Range in Ellsworth Mountains, Antarctica. It flows northwestwards into Hansen Glacier.

The feature is named after Valoga Cave in northwestern Bulgaria.

== Location ==
Valoga Glacier is centred at 78°24′30″S 84°28′00″W. US mapping in 1988.

== See also ==
- List of glaciers in the Antarctic
- Glaciology

== Maps ==
- Vinson Massif. Scale 1:250 000 topographic map. Reston, Virginia: US Geological Survey, 1988.
- Antarctic Digital Database (ADD). Scale 1:250000 topographic map of Antarctica. Scientific Committee on Antarctic Research (SCAR). Since 1993, regularly updated.
