= Pulpudeva Glacier =

Glacier in Antarctica

- Location of Sentinel Range in Western Antarctica

- Location within Antarctica
- Type: tributary
- Location: Ellsworth Land
- Coordinates: 78°21′00″S 85°12′30″W
- Length: 4.6 nautical miles (8.5 km; 5.3 mi)
- Width: 3.2 nautical miles (5.9 km; 3.7 mi)
- Thickness: unknown
- Terminus: Ellen Glacier
- Status: unknown

Sentinel Range map

Pulpudeva Glacier (Bulgarian: ледник Пулпудева, romanized: lednik Pulpudeva, IPA: [ˈlɛdnik poɫpoˈdɛvɐ]) is the 4.6 nautical miles (8.5 km; 5.3 mi) long and 3.2 nautical miles (5.9 km; 3.7 mi) wide glacier in Sullivan Heights, Sentinel Range in Ellsworth Mountains, Antarctica. It is draining the area northeast of Nebeska Peak, north of Johnson Col and northwest of Mount Farrell, flowing northwards west of Mount Levack, and (together with Crosswell and Patton Glaciers) joining Ellen Glacier northwest of Mamarchev Peak and southeast of Mount Jumper.

The glacier is named after the ancient Thracian town of Pulpudeva in Southern Bulgaria.

== Location ==
Pulpudeva Glacier is centred at 78°21′00″S 85°12′30″W. US mapping in 1961, updated in 1988.

== See also ==
- List of glaciers in the Antarctic
- Glaciology

== Maps ==
- Vinson Massif. Scale 1:250 000 topographic map. Reston, Virginia: US Geological Survey, 1988.
- Antarctic Digital Database (ADD). Scale 1:250000 topographic map of Antarctica. Scientific Committee on Antarctic Research (SCAR). Since 1993, regularly updated.
