= Johnson Col =

Col in the Sullivan Heights, Antarctica

Location of Sentinel Range in Western Antarctica.

Sentinel Range map.

Johnson Col (78°22′S 85°10′W) is a col at about 1,800 metres (5,900 ft), located in the Sullivan Heights 2 nautical miles (4 km) west-southwest of Mount Farrell in the central part of the Sentinel Range of the Ellsworth Mountains, Antarctica. It was first mapped by the United States Geological Survey from surveys and U.S. Navy air photos, 1957–59, and was named by the Advisory Committee on Antarctic Names for Earl F. Johnson, a U.S. Navy utilitiesman at South Pole Station in 1957.

== Maps ==
- Vinson Massif. Scale 1:250 000 topographic map. Reston, Virginia: US Geological Survey, 1988.
- Antarctic Digital Database (ADD). Scale 1:250000 topographic map of Antarctica. Scientific Committee on Antarctic Research (SCAR). Since 1993, regularly updated.
