= Orizari Glacier =

Glacier in Antarctica

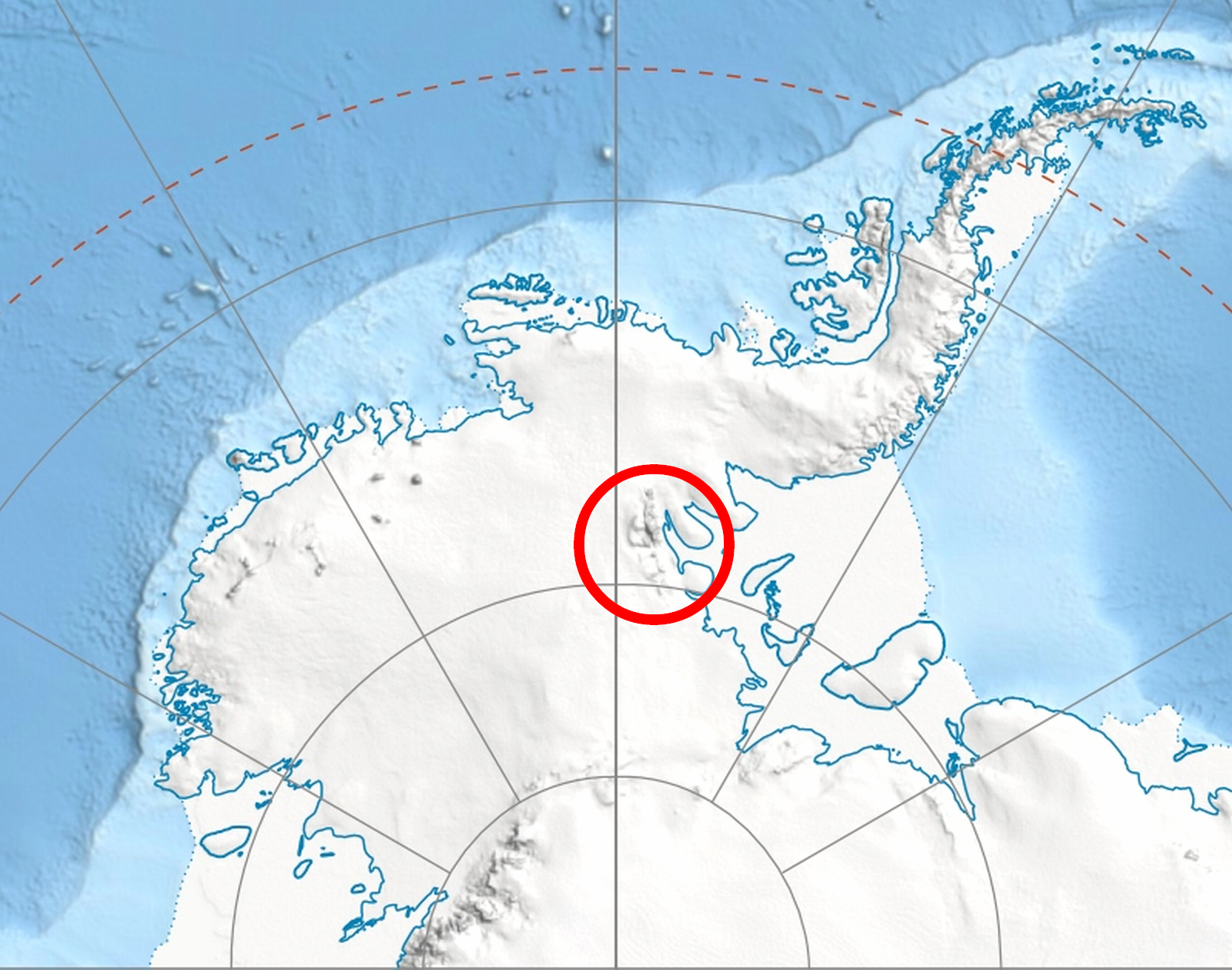
- Location of Ellsworth Mountains in Western Antarctica

- Location within Antarctica
- Type: tributary
- Location: Ellsworth Land
- Coordinates: 78°26′10″S 84°56′00″W
- Length: 3 nautical miles (5.6 km; 3.5 mi)
- Width: 0.5 nautical miles (0.93 km; 0.58 mi)
- Thickness: unknown
- Terminus: Dater Glacier
- Status: unknown

Sentinel Range map.

Orizari Glacier (Bulgarian: ледник Оризари, romanized: lednik Orizari, IPA: [ˈlɛdnik oriˈzari]) is the 3 nautical miles (5.6 km; 3.5 mi) long and 0.5 nautical miles (0.93 km; 0.58 mi) wide glacier in Veregava Ridge on the east side of Sentinel Range in Ellsworth Mountains, Antarctica. It is draining the north slopes of Mount Waldron, and flowing north-northwestwards to join Dater Glacier west of Sipey Bluff.

The feature is named after the settlements of Orizari in southern Bulgaria.

== Location ==
Orizari Glacier is centred at 78°26′10″S 84°56′00″W. US mapping in 1988.

== See also ==
- List of glaciers in the Antarctic
- Glaciology

== Maps ==
- Vinson Massif. Scale 1:250 000 topographic map. Reston, Virginia: US Geological Survey, 1988.
- Antarctic Digital Database (ADD). Scale 1:250000 topographic map of Antarctica. Scientific Committee on Antarctic Research (SCAR). Since 1993, regularly updated.
