= Johnson Spur =

Location of Sentinel Range in Western Antarctica.

Sentinel Range map.

Johnson Spur (78°37′S 84°0′W) is a rocky spur located 5.67 miles (9.1 km) south-southeast of Taylor Spur, 8.26 miles (13.3 km) southwest of Batil Spur and 8.65 miles (13.9 km) north-northwest of Long Peak, on the east side of the Sentinel Range in the Ellsworth Mountains of Antarctica. It forms the southeastern extremity of the Doyran Heights, and overlooks Rutford Ice Stream to the east and Obelya Glacier to the west.

The feature was first mapped by the United States Geological Survey from surveys and U.S. Navy air photos, 1957–59, and was named by the Advisory Committee on Antarctic Names for William F. Johnson, a meteorologist at South Pole Station in 1957.

== Maps ==
- Vinson Massif. Scale 1:250 000 topographic map. Reston, Virginia: US Geological Survey, 1988.
