= Mediolana Bluff =

Mountain in Antarctica

Location of Brabant Island in the Antarctic Peninsula region.

Mediolana Bluff (Bulgarian: рид Медиолана, romanized: rid Mediolana, IPA: [ˈrid mɛdioˈɫanɐ]) is the ice-covered bluff of elevation 1300 m in the northwest part of Basarbovo Ridge in Stribog Mountains on Brabant Island in the Palmer Archipelago, Antarctica. It has steep and partly ice-free west and south slopes, and surmounts Malpighi Glacier to the southwest and Svetovrachene Glacier to the northeast.

The peak is named after the ancient Roman fortress of Mediolana in Northeastern Bulgaria.

== Location ==
Mediolana Bluff is located at 64°15′44″S 62°15′49″W, which is 6.8 km east of Mount Parry, 6.2 km southwest of Opizo Peak, 6.22 km west-southwest of Einthoven Hill and 3.23 km northwest of Podem Peak. British mapping in 1980 and 2008.

== Maps ==
- Antarctic Digital Database (ADD). Scale 1:250000 topographic map of Antarctica. Scientific Committee on Antarctic Research (SCAR). Since 1993, regularly upgraded and updated.
- British Antarctic Territory. Scale 1:200000 topographic map. DOS 610 Series, Sheet W 64 62. Directorate of Overseas Surveys, Tolworth, UK, 1980.
- Brabant Island to Argentine Islands. Scale 1:250000 topographic map. British Antarctic Survey, 2008.
