= Mount Mohl =

Mountain in Ellsworth Land, Antarctica

Location of Sentinel Range in Western Antarctica.

Central and southern Sentinel Range map.

Mount Mohl (78°33′S 85°5′W) is a mountain, 3,710 metres (12,170 ft) high, at the east side of Vinson Massif, surmounting the ridge between the heads of Dater Glacier and Thomas Glacier, in the Sentinel Range of the Ellsworth Mountains, Antarctica. It is connected to Doyran Heights to the northeast by Goreme Col.

The peak was first mapped by the United States Geological Survey from surveys and U.S. Navy air photos from 1957 to 1959, and was named by the Advisory Committee on Antarctic Names for Commander Edgar A. Mohl, U.S. Navy, who was a hydrographic officer on the staff of the Commander, U.S. Navy Task Force 43, during Deep Freeze Operations I and II in 1955–56 and 1956–57.

== See also ==
- Mountains in Antarctica

== Maps ==
- Vinson Massif. Scale 1:250 000 topographic map. Reston, Virginia: US Geological Survey, 1988.
- Antarctic Digital Database (ADD). Scale 1:250000 topographic map of Antarctica. Scientific Committee on Antarctic Research (SCAR). Since 1993, regularly updated.
