= Mamarchev Peak =

Mountain in Ellsworth Land, Antarctica

Location of Sentinel Range in Western Antarctica.

Sentinel Range map.

Mamarchev Peak (Bulgarian: Мамарчев връх, romanized: Mamarchev vrah, IPA: [mɐˈmart͡ʃɛv ˈvrɤx]) is the peak with tween heights both rising to 2,403 m (7,884 ft) in the north part of Sullivan Heights in central Sentinel Range in Ellsworth Mountains, Antarctica, and surmounting Pulpudeva Glacier to the west and Ellen Glacier to the north.

The peak is named after Georgi Mamarchev (1786–1846), leader of the Bulgarian liberation movement, in connection with the settlement of Mamarchevo in Southern Bulgaria.

== Location ==
Mamarchev Peak is located at 78°18′49″S 85°08′54″W, which is 2.37 km (1.47 mi) northwest of Mount Levack, 10.9 km east-northeast of Mount Bearskin, 11.08 km (6.88 mi) southeast of Mount Jumper and 5.28 km (3.28 mi) south of Roberts Peak. US mapping in 1961, updated in 1988.

== See also ==
- Mountains in Antarctica

== Maps ==
- Vinson Massif. Scale 1:250 000 topographic map. Reston, Virginia: US Geological Survey, 1988.
- Antarctic Digital Database (ADD). Scale 1:250000 topographic map of Antarctica. Scientific Committee on Antarctic Research (SCAR). Since 1993, regularly updated.
