= Muevski Cove =

Cove in the South Shetland Islands, Antarctica

Coordinates: 62°52′50.0″S 62°18′35.0″W

Location of Smith Island in the South Shetland Islands.

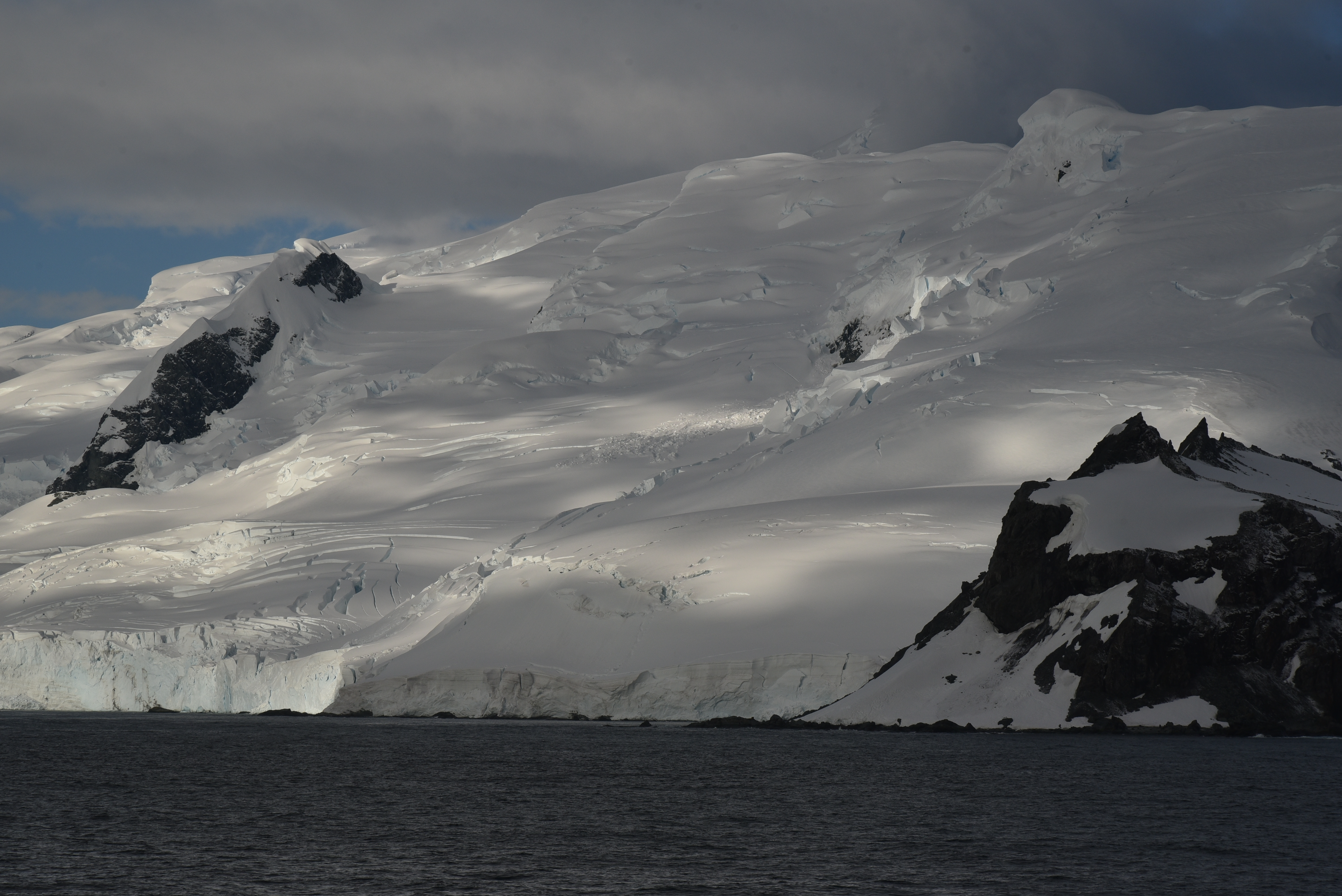
Cape Smith from Boyd Strait, with Muevski Cove on the left

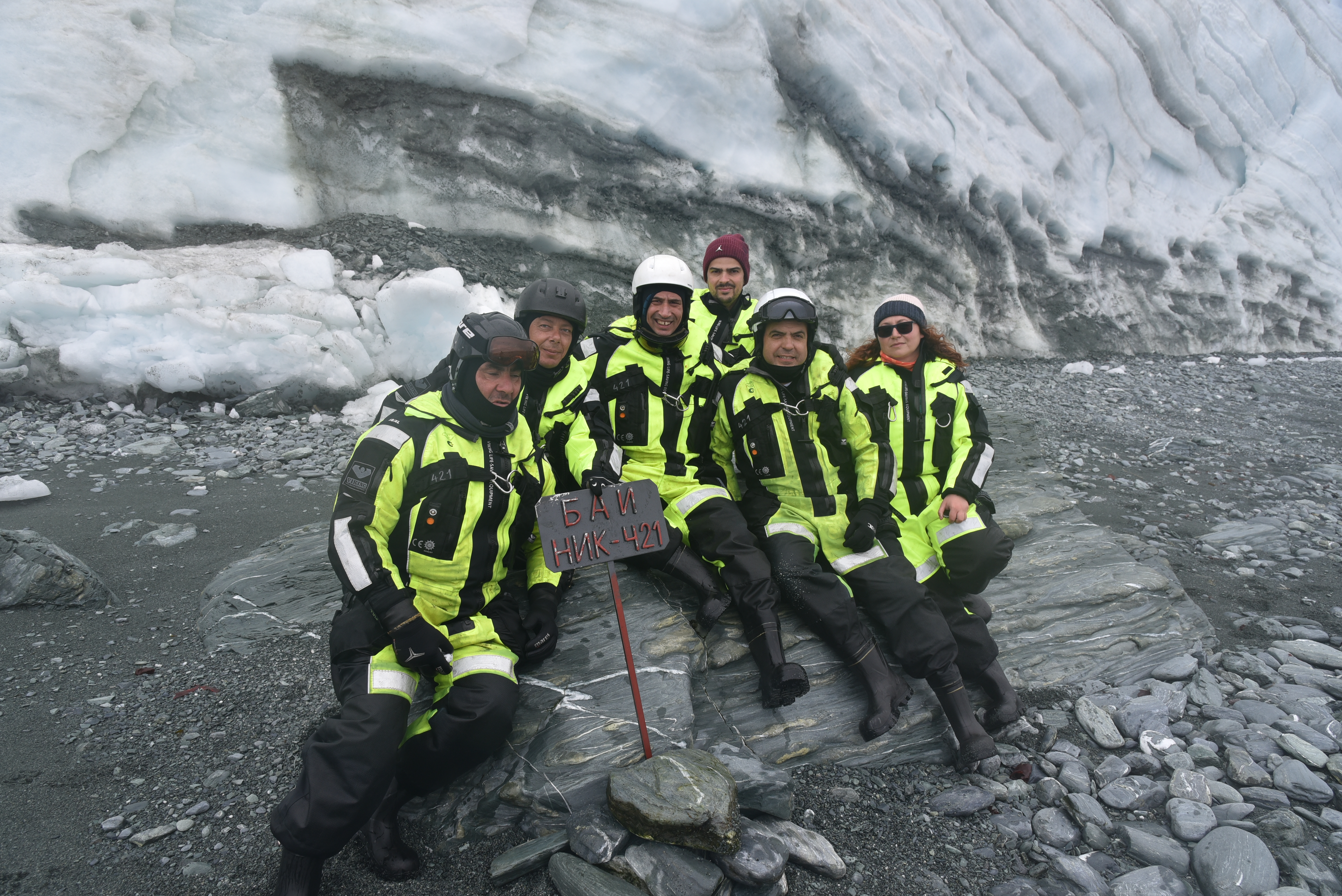
The first Bulgarian landing party on Smith Island, 10 January 2025

Topographic map of Smith Island

Muevski Cove (Bulgarian: Муевски залив, romanized: Muevski zaliv, IPA: [ˈmuɛfski ˈzalif]) is the 1 km wide cove indenting 350 m into the southeastern coast of Smith Island, South Shetland Islands in Antarctica, and entered south of Cape Smith. The area was visited by seal hunters in the early 19th century.

The feature is named after Capt. 2nd rank Radko Muevski, Chief mate in the 2022/23 and 2023/24 austral summer seasons, and commander in the 2024/25 and 2025/26 seasons of the polar research vessel RSV 421 Sts. Cyril and Methodius of the Nikola Vaptsarov Naval Academy in Varna and the Bulgarian Antarctic Institute. He led the first Bulgarian survey of Smith Island, including a landing at the cove on 10 January 2025. Approval date: February 10, 2025.

== Maps ==
- Chart of South Shetland including Coronation Island, &c. from the exploration of the sloop Dove in the years 1821 and 1822 by George Powell Commander of the same. Scale ca. 1:200000. London: Laurie, 1822.
- L.L. Ivanov. Antarctica: Livingston Island and Greenwich, Robert, Snow and Smith Islands. Scale 1:120000 topographic map. Troyan: Manfred Wörner Foundation, 2010. ISBN 978-954-92032-9-5 (First edition 2009. ISBN 978-954-92032-6-4)
- South Shetland Islands: Smith and Low Islands. Scale 1:150000 topographic map No. 13677. British Antarctic Survey, 2009.
- Antarctic Digital Database (ADD). Scale 1:250000 topographic map of Antarctica. Scientific Committee on Antarctic Research (SCAR). Since 1993, regularly upgraded and updated.
- L.L. Ivanov. Antarctica: Livingston Island and Smith Island. Scale 1:100000 topographic map. Manfred Wörner Foundation, 2017. ISBN 978-619-90008-3-0
- A. Kamburov, L. Ivanov, N. Aleksandrova, V. Nikolova. Cape Smith, Smith Island, Antarctica. Scale 1:10000 topographic map. Manfred Wörner Foundation, 2026. ISBN 978-619-92883-2-0
