= Berisad Glacier =

Glacier in Antarctica

- Location of Sentinel Range in Western Antarctica

- Location within Antarctica
- Location: Ellsworth Land
- Coordinates: 78°25′20″S 84°51′50″W
- Length: 3 nmi (6 km; 3 mi)
- Width: 1 nmi (2 km; 1 mi)
- Thickness: unknown
- Terminus: Dater Glacier
- Status: unknown

Sentinel Range map.

Berisad Glacier (Bulgarian: ледник Берисад, romanized: lednik Berisad, IPA: [ˈlɛdniɡ ˈbɛrisɐt]) is a glacier 3 nmi (6 km; 3 mi) long and 1 nmi (2 km; 1 mi) wide in Veregava Ridge, central Sentinel Range in Ellsworth Mountains, Antarctica. It flows north-northwestwards from Kushla Peak to join Dater Glacier northeast of Sipey Bluff.

The glacier is named after the Thracian king Berisad, 358-352 BC.

== Location ==
Berisad Glacier is centred at 78°25′20″S 84°51′50″W. US mapping in 1961, updated in 1988.

== See also ==
- List of glaciers in the Antarctic
- Glaciology

== Maps ==
- Vinson Massif. Scale 1:250 000 topographic map. Reston, Virginia: US Geological Survey, 1988.
- Antarctic Digital Database (ADD). Scale 1:250000 topographic map of Antarctica. Scientific Committee on Antarctic Research (SCAR). Since 1993, regularly updated.
