= Macheret Trench =

Trench in the South Shetland Islands

Location of Livingston Island in the South Shetland Islands.

Topographic map of Livingston Island and Smith Island.

Macheret Trench (Bulgarian: падина Мачерет, ‘Padina Macheret’ \pa-'di-na ma-che-'ret\) is the narrow, elongated subglacial valley reaching a maximum depth of 120 m below sea level beneath upper Perunika Glacier on Livingston Island in the South Shetland Islands, Antarctica. From its deepest section at 62°36'38.0"S by 60°15'55.0"W, situated north of Rezen Knoll, the feature extends below sea level 3.8 km in southeast direction to near Wörner Gap.

The feature is named after the Russian glaciologist Yuriy Macheret, leader of the Russian-Spanish-Uzbekistan ice cap radio sounding project that discovered the trench in 2006.

== Location ==
Macheret Trench is centred at 62°37′20″S 60°14′50″W. Russian-Spanish-Uzbekistan mapping in 2009.

== Maps ==
- L.L. Ivanov. Antarctica: Livingston Island and Greenwich, Robert, Snow and Smith Islands. Scale 1:120000 topographic map. Troyan: Manfred Wörner Foundation, 2009. ISBN 978-954-92032-6-4
