= Herbert T. Levack =

US Air Force officer (1916–2010)

- Born: March 14, 1916; Athol, Massachusetts; United States
- Died: January 27, 2010 (aged 93) Hartford, Connecticut; United States
- Buried: Mt. St. Benedict Cemetery; Hartford, Connecticut; United States
- Branch: United States Air Force
- Service years: 1941–1965
- Rank: Colonel
- Known for: Operations Officer for the first Operation Deep Freeze exploring Antarctica; Mount Levack named after him
- Wars: World War II; Korea; Vietnam
- Spouse: Mary Long Levack (July 3, 1944)
- Other work: Aeronautical Charts and Information Center; St. Louis, Missouri

Col. Herbert T. Levack (March 14, 1916 – January 27, 2010) was a command pilot in the U.S. Air Force flying B-24s in World War II, and C-124s in Korea and Vietnam. He was also the Operations Officer for the first Operation Deep Freeze exploring the Antarctica. Mount Levack was named after him by the Advisory Committee on Antarctic Names (US-ACAN).

== Early years ==
Herbert T. Levack was born on March 14, 1916, in Athol, Massachusetts, to Esther (Thompson) and Edmund Levack. As a young man he moved to Hartford, Connecticut.
