= Obelya Glacier =

Glacier in Antarctica

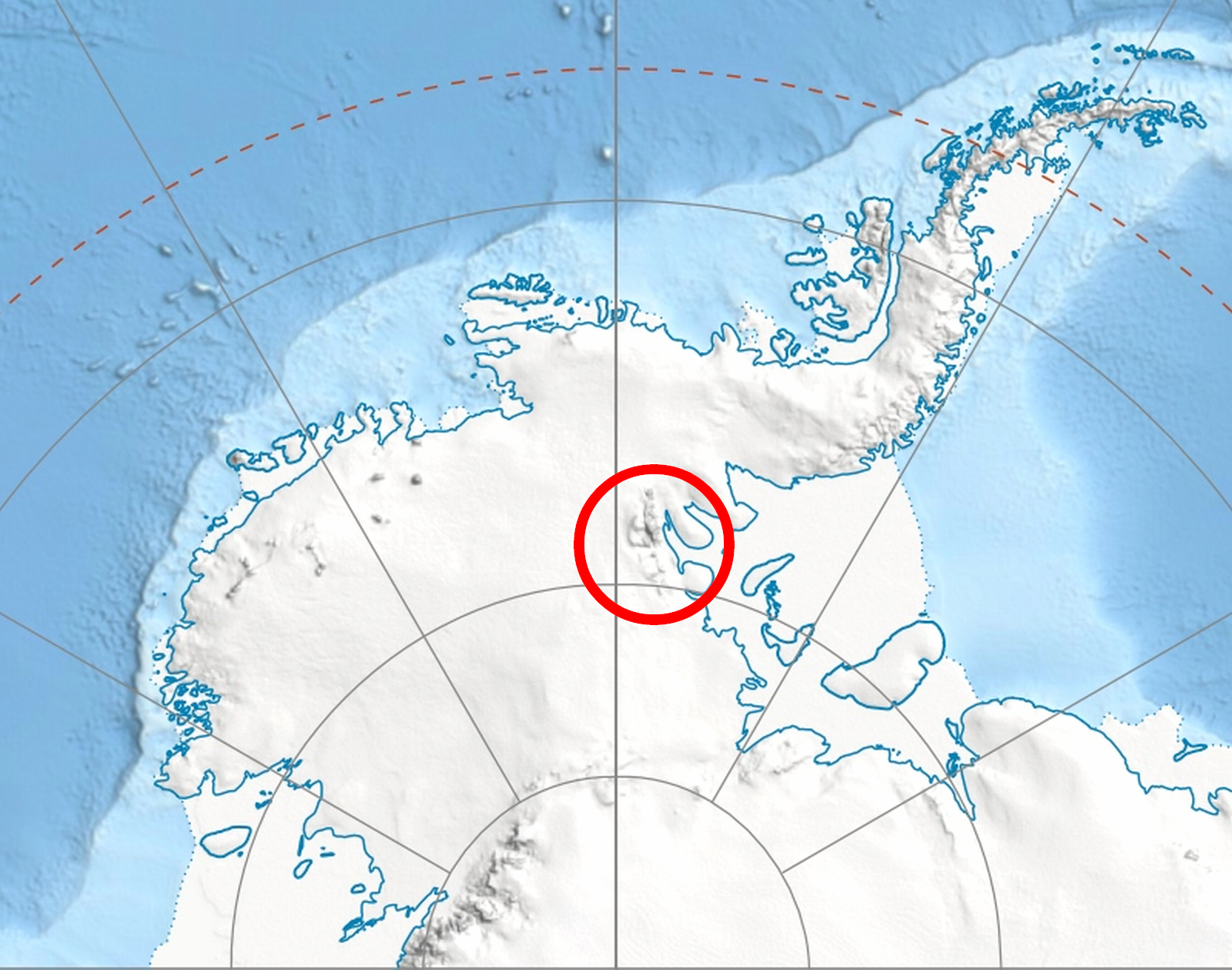
- Location of Ellsworth Mountains in Western Antarctica

- Location within Antarctica
- Type: tributary
- Location: Ellsworth Land
- Coordinates: 78°37′00″S 84°23′00″W
- Length: 4.6 nautical miles (8.5 km; 5.3 mi)
- Width: 1.5 nautical miles (2.8 km; 1.7 mi)
- Thickness: unknown
- Terminus: Thomas Glacier
- Status: unknown

Sentinel Range map.

Obelya Glacier (Bulgarian: ледник Обеля, romanized: lednik Obelya, IPA: [ˈlɛdnik oˈbɛʎɐ]) is the 4.6 nautical miles (8.5 km; 5.3 mi) long and 1.5 nautical miles (2.8 km; 1.7 mi) wide glacier on the east side of southern Sentinel Range in Ellsworth Mountains, Antarctica, situated south of Remington Glacier, and flowing southeastwards along the southwest side of Johnson Spur and east of Mount Benson to join Thomas Glacier.

The glacier is named after the settlement of Obelya in Western Bulgaria, now part of the city of Sofia.

== Location ==
Obelya Glacier is centred at 78°37′00″S 84°23′00″W. US mapping in 1961, updated in 1988.

== See also ==
- List of glaciers in the Antarctic
- Glaciology

== Maps ==
- Vinson Massif. Scale 1:250 000 topographic map. Reston, Virginia: US Geological Survey, 1988.
- Antarctic Digital Database (ADD). Scale 1:250000 topographic map of Antarctica. Scientific Committee on Antarctic Research (SCAR). Since 1993, regularly updated.
