= Sullivan Heights =

Group of mountains in Western Antarctica

Location of Sentinel Range in Western Antarctica.

Sentinel Range map.

Sullivan Heights (78°19′S 85°3′W) is a compact group of mountains in western Antarctica rising to 2,760 m (9,060 ft) in Mount Levack centered 11.5 nautical miles (21.3 km; 13.2 mi) east-northeast of Mount Tyree in the Sentinel Range, Ellsworth Mountains. Roughly elliptical in plan and 11 nautical miles (20 km; 13 mi) long, the feature includes sharp mountain peaks, rugged ridges, and steep peripheral scarps. The heights are encompassed by the flow of the Crosswell, Ellen, and Dater Glaciers, with their interior drained also by Pulpudeva and Strinava Glaciers. Separated from Vinson Massif to the south-southwest by Vranya Pass.

The feature was named in 1997 by the Advisory Committee on Antarctic Names (US-ACAN) after Cornelius Wayne Sullivan (b. 1943), American oceanographer; United States Antarctic Program (USAP) field team leader for Sea Ice Microbial Communities (SIMCO) studies in McMurdo Sound, 1980–86, 1988, 1989; chief scientist and cruise coordinator for AMERIEZ (Antarctic Marine Ecosystem Research at the Ice Edge Zone) projects in Weddell Sea, Nov–Dec 1983, Feb–Apr 1986, June–July 1988; Professor of Biological Science, Hancock Institute of Marine Studies, Director, 1991–93; Director, Office of Polar Programs, National Science Foundation, 1993–97.

== Maps ==
- Vinson Massif. Scale 1:250 000 topographic map. Reston, Virginia: US Geological Survey, 1988.

== Features ==
Geographical features include:

- Crosswell Glacier
- Dater Glacier
- Johnson Col
- Mamarchev Peak
- Mount Farrell
- Mount Levack
- Mount Segers
- Nebeska Peak
- Pulpudeva Glacier
- Strinava Glacier
- Vranya Pass
- Zmeevo Pass
