= Melanita Island =

Island in Palmer Archipelago, Antarctica

- Location within Antarctica Location within Antarctic Peninsula

Geography
- Location: Antarctica
- Coordinates: 63°50′27″S 60°58′21″W
- Archipelago: Palmer Archipelago
- Length: 780 m (2560 ft)
- Width: 400 m (1300 ft)

Administration
- Antarctica
- Administered under the Antarctic Treaty System

Demographics
- Population: uninhabited

Melanita Island (Bulgarian: остров Меланита, romanized: ostrov Melanita, IPA: [ˈɔstrof mɛɫɐˈnitɐ]) is the 780 m long in southwest-northeast direction and 400 m wide rocky island lying off Spert Island on the southwest side of Trinity Island in the Palmer Archipelago, Antarctica. It is “named after the ocean fishing trawler Melanita of the Bulgarian company Ocean Fisheries – Burgas whose ships operated in the waters of South Georgia, Kerguelen, the South Orkney Islands, South Shetland Islands and Antarctic Peninsula from 1970 to the early 1990s. The Bulgarian fishermen, along with those of the Soviet Union, Poland and East Germany are the pioneers of modern Antarctic fishing industry.”

== Location ==
Melanita Island is located at 63°50′27″S 60°58′21″W, which is 270 m northeast of Spert Island, 3 km northwest of Bulnes Point and 6.15 km west-southwest of Romero Point. British mapping in 1978.

== Maps ==
- British Antarctic Territory. Scale 1:200000 topographic map. DOS 610 – W 63 60. Tolworth, UK, 1978.
- Antarctic Digital Database (ADD). Scale 1:250000 topographic map of Antarctica. Scientific Committee on Antarctic Research (SCAR). Since 1993, regularly upgraded and updated.
