= Hough Glacier =

Glacier in Antarctica

- Location of Vinson Massif in Western Antarctica

- Location within Antarctica
- Location: Ellsworth Land
- Coordinates: 78°32′S 84°20′W
- Length: 10 nautical miles (19 km; 12 mi)
- Thickness: unknown
- Status: unknown

Central and southern Sentinel Range map.

Hough Glacier (78°32′S 84°20′W) is a glacier in central Doyran Heights in the Sentinel Range of Ellsworth Mountains, Antarctica, rising just south of Mount Tuck and flowing east-southeast for 10 nautical miles (19 km; 12 mi) between Guerrero Glacier and Remington Glacier. It was first mapped by the United States Geological Survey from surveys and U.S. Navy air photos, 1957–59, and was named by the Advisory Committee on Antarctic Names for William S. Hough, who made ionosphere studies at South Pole Station in 1957.

== See also ==
- List of glaciers in the Antarctic
- Glaciology

== Maps ==
- Vinson Massif. Scale 1:250 000 topographic map. Reston, Virginia: US Geological Survey, 1988.
- Antarctic Digital Database (ADD). Scale 1:250000 topographic map of Antarctica. Scientific Committee on Antarctic Research (SCAR). Since 1993, regularly updated.
