= Veregava Ridge =

Location of Sentinel Range in Western Antarctica.

Sentinel Range map.

Veregava Ridge (Bulgarian: хребет Верегава, ‘Hrebet Veregava’ \'hre-bet ve-re-'ga-va\) is the ridge rising to 3210 m at Mount Waldron in the northeast foothills of Vinson Massif in Sentinel Range, Ellsworth Mountains in Antarctica. The feature extends 15.7 km in southwest–northeast direction and 6 km in southeast–northwest direction, and has its interior drained by Berisad Glacier and Orizari Glacier. It is bounded by Dater Glacier to the west and north, and its tributary Hansen Glacier to the southeast, and separated from Doyran Heights to the south by Manole Pass.

The ridge is named after the eastern Balkan Mountains (old Bulgarian name Veregava).

== Location ==
Veregava Ridge is centred at 78°26′30″S 84°55′00″W. US mapping in 1961, updated in 1988.

== Maps ==
- Vinson Massif. Scale 1:250 000 topographic map. Reston, Virginia: US Geological Survey, 1988.
- Antarctic Digital Database (ADD). Scale 1:250000 topographic map of Antarctica. Scientific Committee on Antarctic Research (SCAR). Since 1993, regularly updated.

== Features ==
Geographical features include:

- Berisad Glacier
- Dater Glacier
- Hansen Glacier
- Kushla Peak
- Manole Pass
- Mount Waldron
- Orizari Glacier
- Parangalitsa Peak
- Sipey Bluff
