= Mikre Beach =

Beach in Antarctica

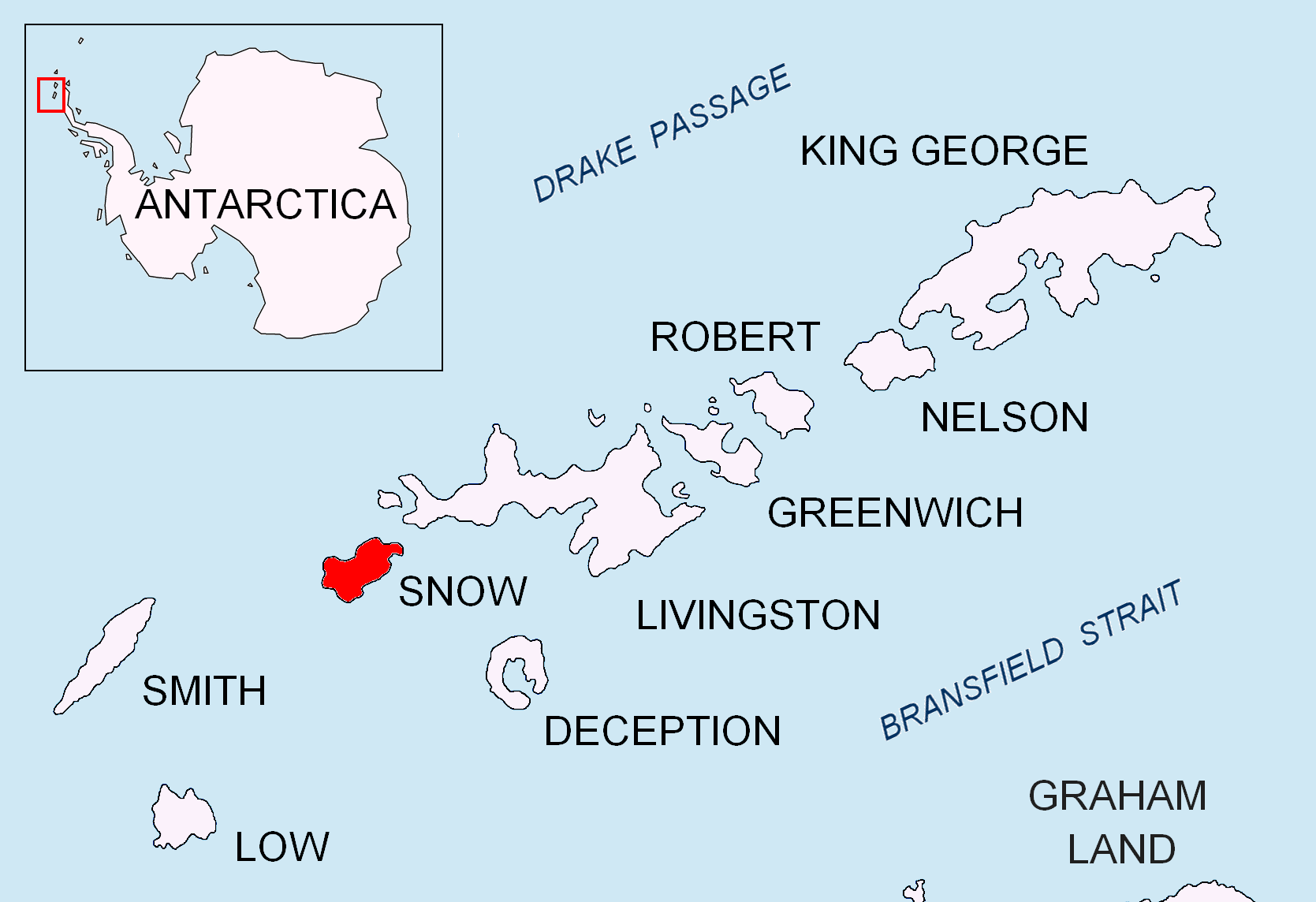
Location of Snow Island in the South Shetland Islands.

Topographic map of Livingston Island, Greenwich, Robert, Snow and Smith Islands.

Mikre Beach (Bulgarian: Микренски бряг, romanized: Mikrenski bryag, IPA: [ˈmikrɛnski ˈbrʲak]) is the beach extending 2.2 km on the southeast coast of Snow Island in the South Shetland Islands, Antarctica. It is bounded by Cape Conway to the southwest, the island's ice cap to the northwest and Pazardzhik Point to the northeast, and is snow-free in summer.

The beach is named after the settlement of Mikre in Northern Bulgaria.

== Location ==
Mikre Beach is located at 62°50′15″S 61°24′30″W. Bulgarian mapping in 2009.

== Maps ==
- L.L. Ivanov. Antarctica: Livingston Island and Greenwich, Robert, Snow and Smith Islands. Scale 1:120000 topographic map. Troyan: Manfred Wörner Foundation, 2009. ISBN 978-954-92032-6-4 (Updated second edition 2010. ISBN 978-954-92032-9-5)
- L.L. Ivanov. Antarctica: Livingston Island and Greenwich, Robert, Snow and Smith Islands. Scale 1:120000 topographic map. Troyan: Manfred Wörner Foundation, 2009. ISBN 978-954-92032-6-4
- Antarctic Digital Database (ADD). Scale 1:250000 topographic map of Antarctica. Scientific Committee on Antarctic Research (SCAR). Since 1993, regularly upgraded and updated.
