= Mount Benson (Antarctica) =

Mountain in Ellsworth Land, Antarctica

Location of Sentinel Range in Western Antarctica.

Sentinel Range map.

Mount Benson (78°36′23″S 84°31′51″W) is a mountain (2,270 m) standing at the northeast side of Thomas Glacier and west of Obelya Glacier, 4.6 mi east of Mount Osborne, in Doyran Heights, southeastern Sentinel Range in Ellsworth Mountains, Antarctica. It was mapped by the USGS from surveys and USN air photos, 1957–59. It was named by the US-ACAN for Robert F. Benson, seismologist at the IGY South Pole Station in 1957.

== See also ==
- Mountains in Antarctica

== Maps ==
- Vinson Massif. Scale 1:250 000 topographic map. Reston, Virginia: US Geological Survey, 1988.
- Antarctic Digital Database (ADD). Scale 1:250000 topographic map of Antarctica. Scientific Committee on Antarctic Research (SCAR). Since 1993, regularly updated.
