= Vasilev Bay =

Bay in the South Shetland Islands

Location of Livingston Island in the South Shetland Islands.

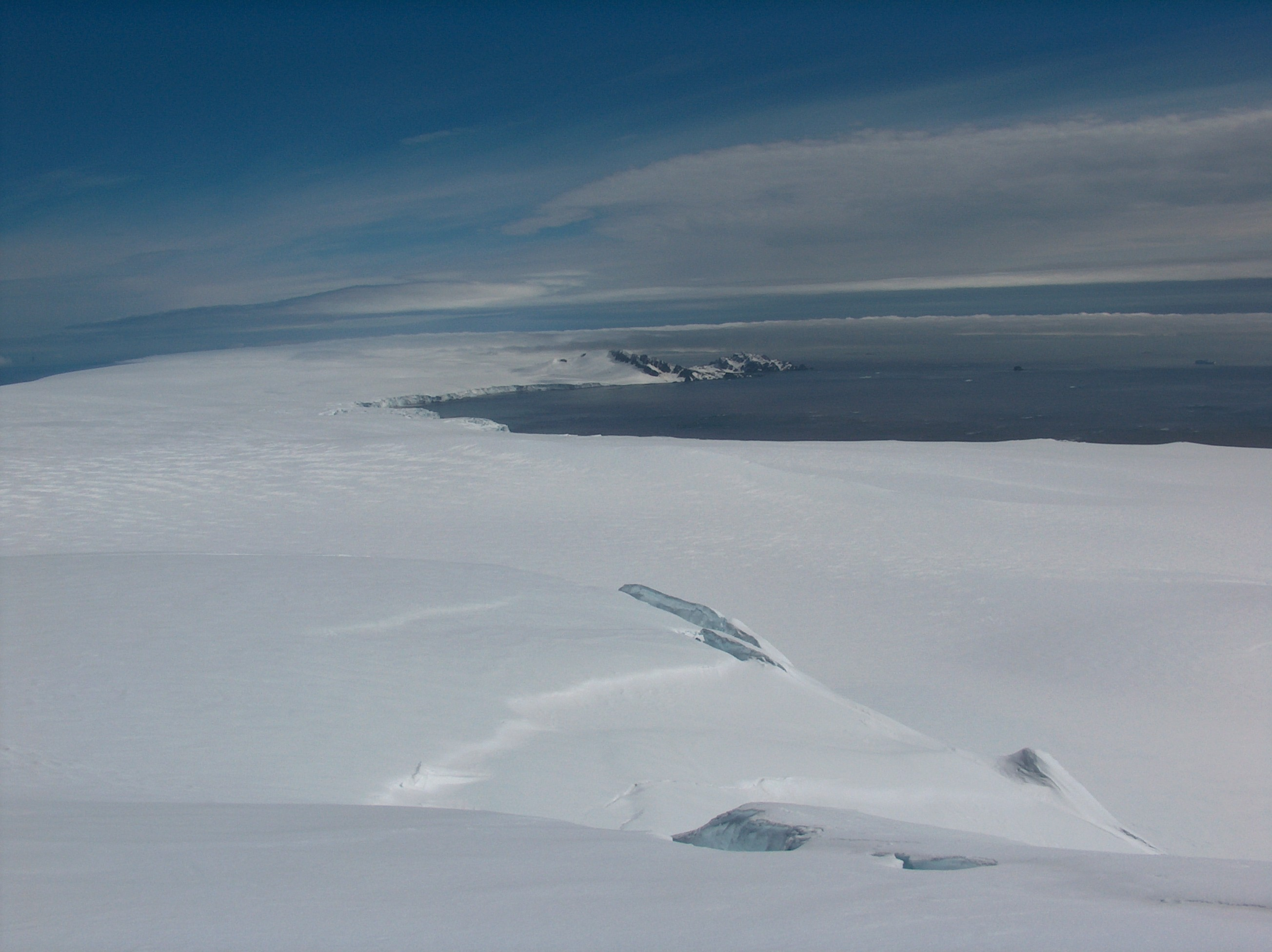
Vasilev Bay from Miziya Peak, with Saedinenie Snowfield in the foreground and Siddins Point in the background.

Topographic map of Livingston Island, Greenwich, Robert, Snow and Smith Islands.

Vasilev Bay is the 9.6 km wide embayment indenting for 3.8 km the north coast of Livingston Island in the South Shetland Islands, Antarctica. The bay is part of Hero Bay, entered between Siddins Point and Bezmer Point.

The feature is named for Nikola Vasilev (b. 1949), physician at St. Kliment Ohridski Base during the 1993/94 season who provided support for the Bulgarian Antarctic programme.

== Location ==
The bay is centred at 62°33′00″S 60°19′40″W (British mapping in 1822 and 1968, Argentine in 1980, and Bulgarian in 2005 and 2009).

== Maps ==
- L.L. Ivanov et al. Antarctica: Livingston Island and Greenwich Island, South Shetland Islands. Scale 1:100000 topographic map. Sofia: Antarctic Place-names Commission of Bulgaria, 2005.
- L.L. Ivanov. Antarctica: Livingston Island and Greenwich, Robert, Snow and Smith Islands. Scale 1:120000 topographic map. Troyan: Manfred Wörner Foundation, 2009. ISBN 978-954-92032-6-4
