= Guerrero Glacier =

Glacier in Antarctica

- Location of Sentinel Range in Western Antarctica

- Location within Antarctica
- Location: Ellsworth Land
- Coordinates: 78°32′00″S 84°15′00″W
- Length: 7 nautical miles (13 km; 8.1 mi)
- Thickness: unknown
- Terminus: Taylor Spur
- Status: unknown

Central and southern Sentinel Range map.

Guerrero Glacier (78°32′S 84°15′W) is a glacier about 7 nautical miles (13 km) long in Doyran Heights, draining from the southeast slopes of Mount Havener southwest of Beloslav Peak to the south side of Taylor Spur, in the southeast part of the Sentinel Range, Ellsworth Mountains, Antarctica. It was first mapped by the United States Geological Survey from surveys and U.S. Navy air photos, 1957–59, and was named by the Advisory Committee on Antarctic Names for John F. Guerrero, a meteorologist at South Pole Station in 1957.

== See also ==
- List of glaciers in the Antarctic
- Glaciology

== Maps ==
- Vinson Massif. Scale 1:250 000 topographic map. Reston, Virginia: US Geological Survey, 1988.
- Antarctic Digital Database (ADD). Scale 1:250000 topographic map of Antarctica. Scientific Committee on Antarctic Research (SCAR). Since 1993, regularly updated.
