= Melta Point =

Rocky point on the coast of Hero Bay, Livingston Island

Location of Livingston Island in the South Shetland Islands.

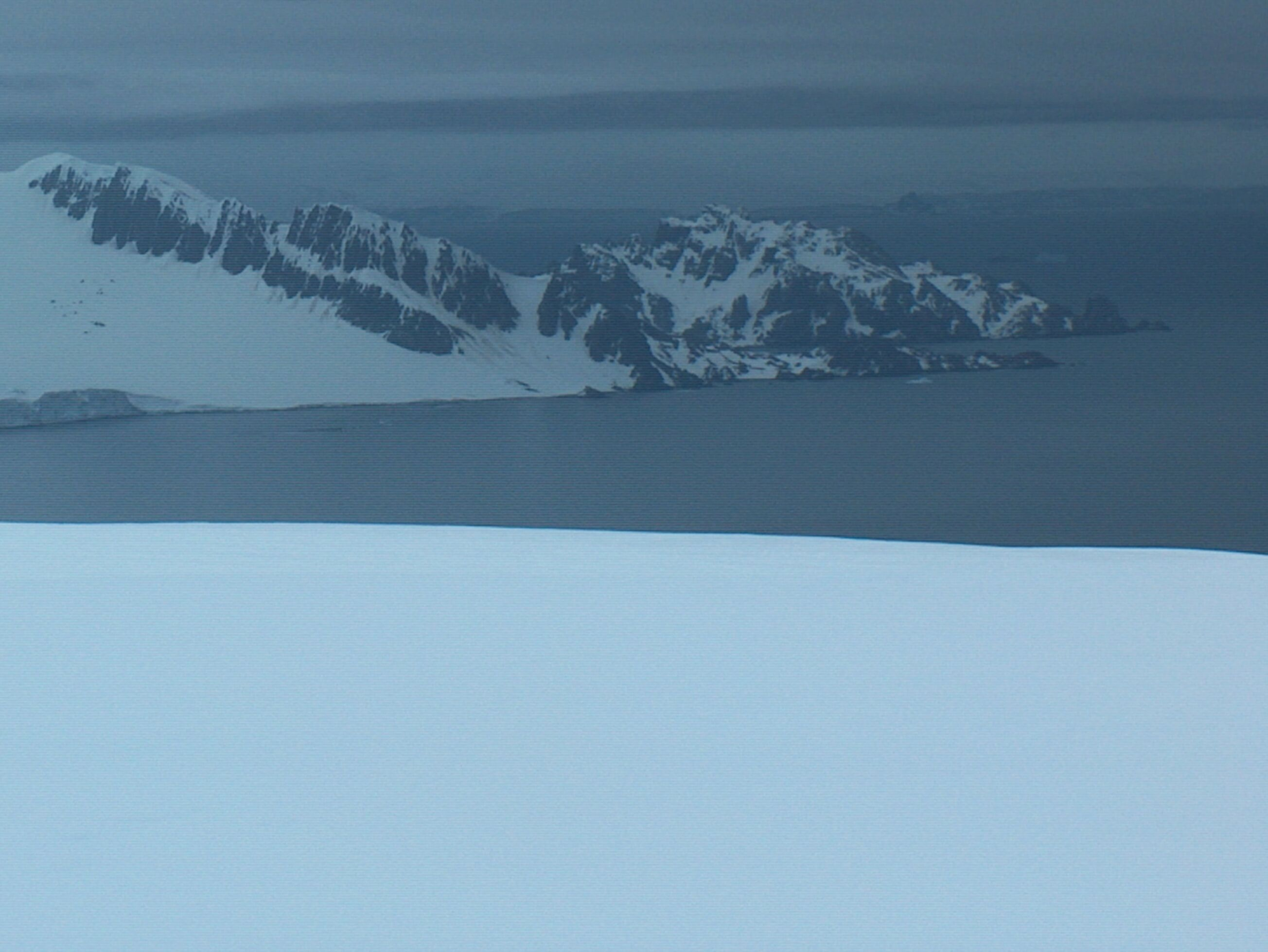
Melta Point from Leslie Gap.

Topographic map of Livingston Island and Smith Island

Melta Point (Nos Melta \'nos 'mel-ta\) is a rocky point on the coast of Hero Bay, Livingston Island, formed by an offshoot of Teres Ridge. Adjacent ice-free area 116 hectares (290 acres). The point is named after the ancient Melta, ancestor of the present town of Lovech in Northern Bulgaria. This is one of the Bulgarian names bestowed on hitherto nameless geographical features by the Tangra 2004/05 Expedition.

== Location ==
The point is located at 62°32′49.8″S 60°24′16″W, which is 1.4 km east-southeast of Siddins Point and 1.5 km north of the summit of Teres Ridge and 8.55 km west-southwest of Bezmer Point (Bulgarian topographic survey Tangra 2004/05, and mapping in 2005 and 2009).

== Maps ==
- L.L. Ivanov et al. Antarctica: Livingston Island and Greenwich Island, South Shetland Islands. Scale 1:100000 topographic map. Sofia: Antarctic Place-names Commission of Bulgaria, 2005.
- L.L. Ivanov. Antarctica: Livingston Island and Greenwich, Robert, Snow and Smith Islands. Scale 1:120000 topographic map. Troyan: Manfred Wörner Foundation, 2010. ISBN 978-954-92032-9-5 (First edition 2009. ISBN 978-954-92032-6-4)
- Antarctic Digital Database (ADD). Scale 1:250000 topographic map of Antarctica. Scientific Committee on Antarctic Research (SCAR). Since 1993, regularly updated.
- L.L. Ivanov. Antarctica: Livingston Island and Smith Island. Scale 1:100000 topographic map. Manfred Wörner Foundation, 2017. ISBN 978-619-90008-3-0
