= McPherson Peak =

Mountain in Ellsworth Land, Antarctica

Location of Sentinel Range in Western Antarctica.

Sentinel Range map.

McPherson Peak (78°32′S 84°42′W) is a peak, 2,200 metres (7,200 ft) high, located at the west side of the head of Remington Glacier, in the Doyran Heights of the Sentinel Range in the Ellsworth Mountains, Antarctica. It was first mapped by the United States Geological Survey from surveys and U.S. Navy air photos from 1957 to 1959, and was named by the Advisory Committee on Antarctic Names for William C. McPherson, Jr., a Navy radioman at South Pole Station in 1957.

== See also ==
- Mountains in Antarctica

== Maps ==
- Vinson Massif. Scale 1:250 000 topographic map. Reston, Virginia: US Geological Survey, 1988.
- Antarctic Digital Database (ADD). Scale 1:250000 topographic map of Antarctica. Scientific Committee on Antarctic Research (SCAR). Since 1993, regularly updated.
