= Einthoven Hill =

Hill in Antarctica

Location of Brabant Island in the Antarctic Peninsula region.

Einthoven Hill (64°14′S 62°9′W) is a hill at the south extremity of Avroleva Heights, 3 nautical miles (6 km) southwest of Mitchell Point on the east side of Brabant Island in the Palmer Archipelago, Antarctica. It was photographed by Hunting Aerosurveys Ltd in 1956–57, and mapped from these photos in 1959. It was named by the UK Antarctic Place-Names Committee for Willem Einthoven, the Dutch inventor of the electrocardiograph.

== Maps ==
- Antarctic Digital Database (ADD). Scale 1:250000 topographic map of Antarctica. Scientific Committee on Antarctic Research (SCAR). Since 1993, regularly upgraded and updated.
- British Antarctic Territory. Scale 1:200000 topographic map. DOS 610 Series, Sheet W 64 62. Directorate of Overseas Surveys, Tolworth, UK, 1980.
- Brabant Island to Argentine Islands. Scale 1:250000 topographic map. British Antarctic Survey, 2008.
