= Remington Glacier =

Glacier in Antarctica

Reminghton Glacier
- Location of Sentinel Range in Western Antarctica

- Location within Antarctica
- Location: Ellsworth Land
- Coordinates: 78°34′00″S 84°18′00″W
- Length: 7 nautical miles (13 km; 8.1 mi)
- Thickness: unknown
- Terminus: Hough Glacier and Johnson Spur
- Status: unknown

Remington Glacier is a steep glacier about 7 nautical miles (13 km; 8.1 mi) long in Doyran Heights in the Sentinel Range of Ellsworth Mountains, Antarctica. It rises just north of McPherson Peak and flows east-southeast to debouch between the terminus of Hough Glacier and Johnson Spur.

== Background ==
Central and southern Sentinel Range map

Discovered by U.S. Navy Squadron VX-6 on photographic flights of 14–15 December 1959, and mapped by United States Geological Survey (USGS) from these photos.

Named by Advisory Committee on Antarctic Names (US-ACAN) for Edward W. Remington, glaciologist at the South Pole Station during the IGY in 1957.

== See also ==
- List of glaciers in the Antarctic
- Glaciology

== Maps ==
- Vinson Massif. Scale 1:250 000 topographic map. Reston, Virginia: US Geological Survey, 1988.
- Antarctic Digital Database (ADD). Scale 1:250000 topographic map of Antarctica. Scientific Committee on Antarctic Research (SCAR). Since 1993, regularly upgraded and updated.
