= Mount Farrell (Antarctica) =

Mountain in Ellsworth Land, Antarctica

- Location of Mount Farrell in West Antarctica

Highest point
- Elevation: 2,600 m (8,500 ft)
- Coordinates: 78°21′S 85°3′W

Geography
- Location: Ellsworth Mountains, West Antarctica
- Parent range: Sentinel Range

Climbing
- Easiest route: basic snow/ice climb

Map showing the Sentinel Range and the Ellsworth Mountains

Mount Farrell is a mountain over 2,600 metres (8,500 ft) high, rising just northwest of Dater Glacier and about 13 nautical miles (24 km) east of Mount Shear, in the Sullivan Heights on the east side of Sentinel Range in the Ellsworth Mountains, Antarctica. It surmounts Pulpudeva Glacier to the northwest, Strinava Glacier to the northeast and Dater Glacier to the south, and is separated from the ridge of Mount Levack to the north by Zmeevo Pass.

The mountain was first mapped by the United States Geological Survey from surveys and U.S. Navy air photos, 1957–59, and was named by the Advisory Committee on Antarctic Names for Lieutenant Lawrence J. Farrell, U.S. Navy, who died in the crash of a UB-1 Otter airplane at Marble Point on January 4, 1959.

== See also ==
- Mountains in Antarctica

== Maps ==
- Vinson Massif. Scale 1:250 000 topographic map. Reston, Virginia: US Geological Survey, 1988.
- Antarctic Digital Database (ADD). Scale 1:250000 topographic map of Antarctica. Scientific Committee on Antarctic Research (SCAR). Since 1993, regularly updated.
