= Lardeya Ice Piedmont =

Glacier in Antarctica

- Location of Sentinel Range in Western Antarctica

- Location within Antarctica
- Type: tributary
- Location: Ellsworth Land
- Coordinates: 78°43′00″S 84°35′00″W
- Length: 8.6 nautical miles (15.9 km; 9.9 mi)
- Width: 4 nautical miles (7.4 km; 4.6 mi)
- Thickness: unknown
- Terminus: Rutford Ice Stream to the east northeast Ellen Glacier to the north
- Status: unknown

Sentinel Range map

Lardeya Ice Piedmont (Bulgarian: ледник Лардея, romanized: lednik Lardeya, IPA: [ˈlɛdnik ɫɐrˈdɛjɐ]) is the glacier extending 8.6 nautical miles (15.9 km; 9.9 mi) in north-south direction and 4 nautical miles (7.4 km; 4.6 mi) in east-west direction on the east side of Sentinel Range in Ellsworth Mountains, Antarctica. It is draining the northeast slopes of Flowers Hills to flow into Rutford Ice Stream to the east-northeast and Ellen Glacier to the north.

The feature is named after the medieval fortress of Lardeya in southeastern Bulgaria.

== Location ==
Lardeya Ice Piedmont is centred at 78°20′30″S 84°20′00″W. US mapping in 1988.

== See also ==
- List of glaciers in the Antarctic
- Glaciology

== Maps ==
- Vinson Massif. Scale 1:250 000 topographic map. Reston, Virginia: US Geological Survey, 1988.
- Antarctic Digital Database (ADD). Scale 1:250000 topographic map of Antarctica. Scientific Committee on Antarctic Research (SCAR). Since 1993, regularly updated.
