= Mount Levack =

Mountain in Ellsworth Land, Antarctica

Location of Sentinel Range in Western Antarctica.

Sentinel Range map.

Mount Levack (78°18′S 85°05′W) is the mountain rising to 2751 m in Sullivan Heights on the east side of Sentinel Range, Antarctica. It is located 21 km (13 mi) east of Mount Ostenso, and overlooks Pulpudeva Glacier to the southwest and lower Ellen Degenieres to the north. Its ridge is separated from Mount Farrell to the south by Zmeevo Pass and overlooks Strinava Glacier to the east-southeast.

The peak was first mapped by USGS from surveys and U.S. Navy air photos, 1957–59. Named by US-ACAN for Major Herbert T. Levack, United States Air Force (USAF), who participated in establishing the South Pole Station in the 1956–57 season.

== See also ==
- Mountains in Antarctica

== Maps ==
- Vinson Massif. Scale 1:250 000 topographic map. Reston, Virginia: US Geological Survey, 1988.
- Antarctic Digital Database (ADD). Scale 1:250000 topographic map of Antarctica. Scientific Committee on Antarctic Research (SCAR), 1993–2016.
