= Taylor Spur =

Location of Vinson Massif in Western Antarctica.

Central and southern Sentinel Range map.

Taylor Spur (78°31′S 84°9′W) is a wedge-shaped spur in Doyran Heights on the east side of the Sentinel Range, Ellsworth Mountains marking the north side of the terminus of Guerrero Glacier and the west side of the entrance to Sikera Valley. It is located 13.07 km west-northwest of Batil Spur, the south extremity of Flowers Hills.

The feature was first mapped by United States Geological Survey (USGS) from surveys and U.S. Navy air photos, 1957–59. Named by Advisory Committee on Antarctic Names (US-ACAN) for Lieutenant Howard C. Taylor III, U.S. Navy, medical officer at the South Pole Station in 1957.

== Maps ==
- Vinson Massif. Scale 1:250 000 topographic map. Reston, Virginia: US Geological Survey, 1988.
- Antarctic Digital Database (ADD). Scale 1:250000 topographic map of Antarctica. Scientific Committee on Antarctic Research (SCAR). Since 1993, regularly updated.
