= Sikera Valley =

Valley in Antarctica

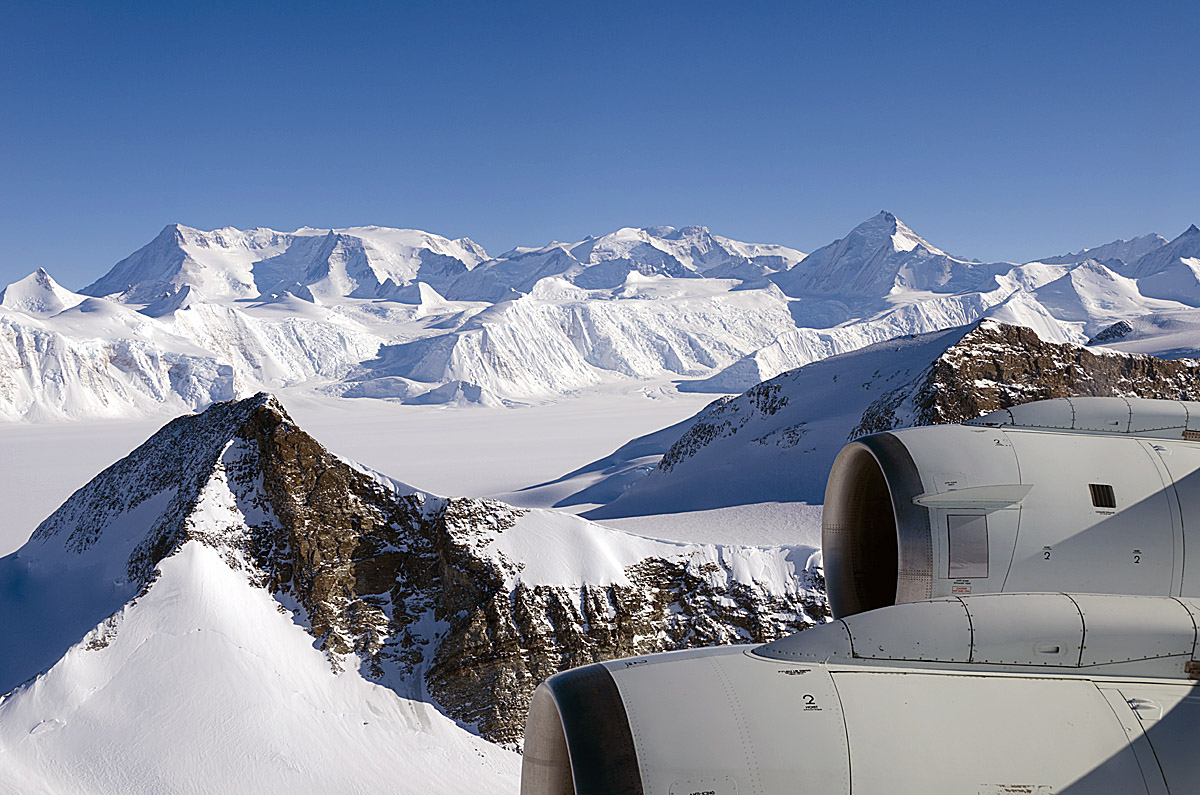
Central Sentinel Range from above Rutford Ice Stream, with Flowers Hills in the foreground, Sikera Valley and Doyran Heights in the middle, and Craddock Massif and Vinson Plateau in the left background

Location of Sentinel Range in West Antarctica

USGS map of Sentinel Range

Sikera Valley (Bulgarian: долина Сикера, ‘Dolina Sikera’ \do-li-'na si-'ke-ra\) is an ice-filled valley spanning 17 km long and 5.7 km wide. The valley is located between Doyran Heights and Flowers Hills on the east side of Sentinel Range in Ellsworth Mountains, Antarctica. A nameless steep 4-km side glacier drains northeastwards from Mount Havener in Doyran Heights, and empties into the upper part of the valley, south of Kostinbrod Pass. The valley ice flows southeastwards towards the Rutford Ice Stream.

The feature is named after the medieval fortress of Sikera in southeastern Bulgaria.

== Location ==
Sikera Valley is centred at 78°30′00″S 84°13′00″W. US mapping in 1988.

== Maps ==
- Vinson Massif. Scale 1:250 000 topographic map. Reston, Virginia: US Geological Survey, 1988.
- Antarctic Digital Database (ADD). Scale 1:250000 topographic map of Antarctica. Scientific Committee on Antarctic Research (SCAR). Since 1993, regularly updated.
