= Mount Waldron =

Mountain in Ellsworth Land, Antarctica

Coordinates: 78°27′S 84°53′W

Location of Sentinel Range in Western Antarctica.

Sentinel Range map.

Mount Waldron is a mountain (3,100 m) in Antarctica, the summit of Veregava Ridge in the Sentinel Range of Ellsworth Mountains. It is situated 3 nautical miles (6 km) north of Mount Tuck, and surmounts Dater Glacier to the west, Orizari Glacier to the north, Berisad Glacier to the northeast, and Hansen Glacier to the southeast.

The mountain was discovered by U.S. Navy Squadron VX-6 on photographic flights of 14–15 December 1959, and was mapped from these photos by the United States Geological Survey (USGS). It was named by the Advisory Committee on Antarctic Names (US-ACAN) for Kenneth L. Waldron, a construction electrician in the U.S. Navy and a member of the IGY South Pole Station winter party of 1957.

== Maps ==
- Vinson Massif. Scale 1:250 000 topographic map. Reston, Virginia: US Geological Survey, 1988.
- Antarctic Digital Database (ADD). Scale 1:250000 topographic map of Antarctica. Scientific Committee on Antarctic Research (SCAR). Since 1993, regularly updated.
