= Mount Segers =

Mountain in Ellsworth Land, Antarctica

Location of Sentinel Range in Western Antarctica.

Sentinel Range map.

Mount Segers (78°25′S 85°21′W) is a mountain at the south extremity of Sullivan Heights in the Sentinel Range, Ellsworth Mountains in Antarctica, separated from Vinson Massif to the southwest by Vranya Pass. It is situated 11 km (7 mi) east of Mount Tyree, on the east side of the head of Crosswell Glacier and surmounting Hinkley Glacier to the southeast.

The peak was discovered by US Navy Squadron VX-6 on photographic flights of Dec. 14–15, 1959, and mapped by USGS from these photos. Named by US-ACAN for Chester W. Segers, a Navy cook and a member of the first wintering party at the South Pole Station during the IGY in 1957.

== Maps ==
- Vinson Massif. Scale 1:250 000 topographic map. Reston, Virginia: US Geological Survey, 1988.
- Antarctic Digital Database (ADD). Scale 1:250000 topographic map of Antarctica. Scientific Committee on Antarctic Research (SCAR). Since 1993, regularly updated.
