= Dickey Peak =

Mountain in the Ellsworth Mountains, Antarctica

Location of Vinson Massif in Western Antarctica.

Central and southern Sentinel Range map.

Dickey Peak (78°19′S 84°26′W) is a rocky peak rising to 1504 m in the northwestern part of the Flowers Hills in the Sentinel Range of the Ellsworth Mountains in Antarctica. It overlooks Dater Glacier to the west and Lardeya Ice Piedmont to the east. The feature was first mapped by the United States Geological Survey from surveys and U.S. Navy air photos, 1957–59, and was named by the Advisory Committee on Antarctic Names for Clifford R. Dickey, Jr., an electronics technician at the South Pole Station in 1957.

== See also ==
- Mountains in Antarctica

== Maps ==
- Vinson Massif. Scale 1:250 000 topographic map. Reston, Virginia: US Geological Survey, 1988.
- Antarctic Digital Database (ADD). Scale 1:250000 topographic map of Antarctica. Scientific Committee on Antarctic Research (SCAR). Since 1993, regularly updated.
