= Rutford Ice Stream =

Antarctic ice stream

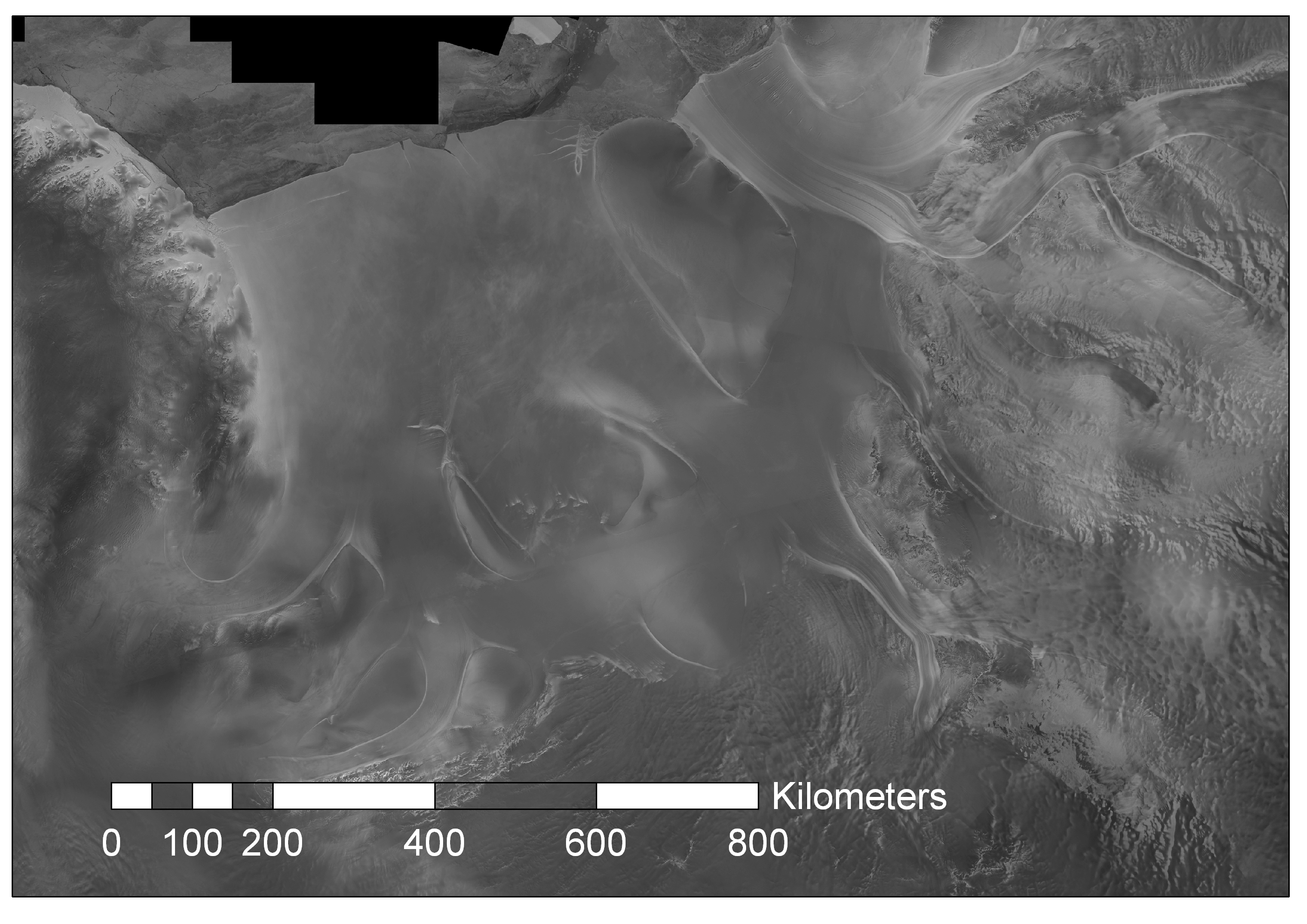
Radarsat image of ice streams, including the Rutford, flowing into the Filchner-Ronne Ice Shelf

Map of Northern Sentinel Range and upper Rutford Ice Stream.

Map of Sentinel Range and Rutford Ice Stream.

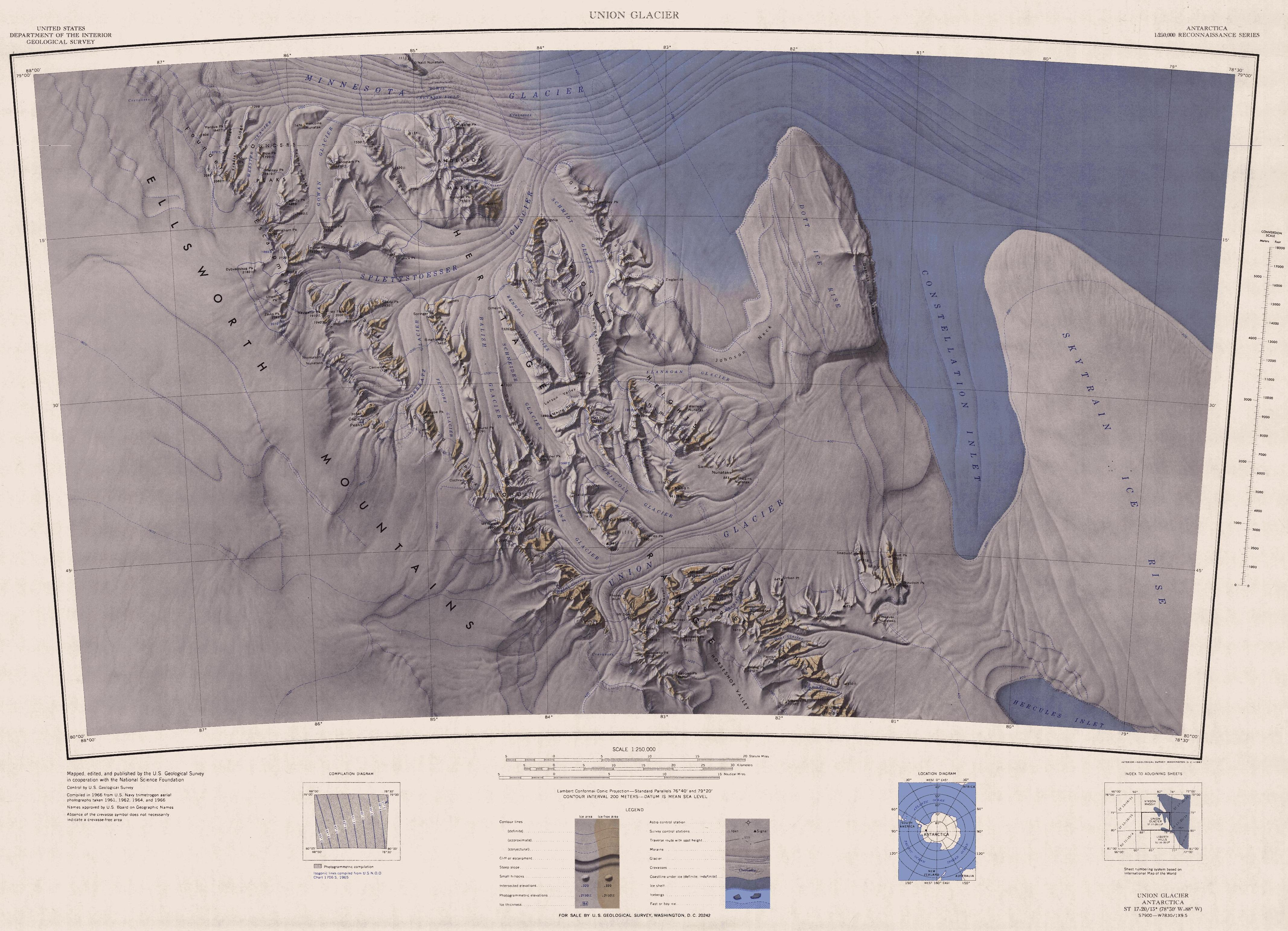
Map of Heritage Range and lower Rutford Ice Stream.

Rutford Ice Stream (79°00′S 81°00′W) is a major Antarctic ice stream, about 290 kilometres (180 mi) long and over 24 kilometres (15 mi) wide, which drains southeastward between the Sentinel Range, Ellsworth Mountains and Fletcher Ice Rise into the southwest part of Ronne Ice Shelf. Named by US-ACAN for geologist Robert Hoxie Rutford, a member of several USARP expeditions to Antarctica; leader of the University of Minnesota Ellsworth Mountains Party, 1963-1964. Rutford served as Director of the Division of Polar Programs, National Science Foundation, 1975-1977.

The ice stream is situated in a deep trough which is a tectonic feature between the Ellsworth Mountains and the Fletcher Promontory. Because of this the ice stream position may have been stable for millions of years. The bed of the ice stream reaches 2,000 metres (6,600 ft) below sea level. Therefore, between the bed of the ice stream and the height of the Ellsworth Mountains there is a vertical relief of 7 kilometres (4.3 mi) over a distance of only 40 kilometres (25 mi). At the upper (inland) end of the ice stream the ice thickness reaches 3,100 metres (10,200 ft) falling to around 2,300 metres (7,500 ft) in the trough. Flow speed reaches a maximum of around 400 metres (1,300 ft) per year about 40 kilometres (25 mi) inland from where the ice stream meets the Ronne Ice Shelf and starts to float on the sea.

The speed of the Rutford ice stream varies by as much as 20% every two weeks, in response to variations in the tides.

== Tributary glaciers ==
- Yamen Glacier
- Vicha Glacier
- Newcomer Glacier
- Vit Ice Piedmont
- Embree Glacier
- Young Glacier
- Ranuli Ice Piedmont
- Ellen Glacier
- Lardeya Ice Piedmont
- Guerrero Glacier
- Hough Glacier
- Remington Glacier
- Thomas Glacier
- Razboyna Glacier
- Drama Glacier
- Gabare Glacier
- Divdyadovo Glacier
- Minnesota Glacier
- Union Glacier

== See also ==
- List of glaciers in the Antarctic
- List of Antarctic ice streams
