= Hansen Glacier =

Glacier in Antarctica

- Location of Sentinel Range in Western Antarctica

- Location within Antarctica
- Location: Ellsworth Land
- Coordinates: 78°21′00″S 84°33′00″W
- Length: 10 nautical miles (19 km; 12 mi)
- Thickness: unknown
- Terminus: Dater Glacier
- Status: unknown

Sentinel Range map

Hansen Glacier (78°21′S 84°33′W) is a tributary glacier 10 nautical miles (19 km; 12 mi) long, flowing northeast from Mount Tuck between Veregava Ridge and Doyran Heights to join Dater Glacier west of Dickey Peak, in the Sentinel Range of the Ellsworth Mountains in Antarctica.

It was first mapped by the United States Geological Survey from surveys and U.S. Navy air photos, 1957–59, and was named by the Advisory Committee on Antarctic Names for Herbert L. Hansen, a meteorologist at South Pole Station in 1957.

== See also ==
- List of glaciers in the Antarctic
- Glaciology

== Maps ==
- Vinson Massif. Scale 1:250 000 topographic map. Reston, Virginia: US Geological Survey, 1988.
- Antarctic Digital Database (ADD). Scale 1:250000 topographic map of Antarctica. Scientific Committee on Antarctic Research (SCAR). Since 1993, regularly updated.
