= Mount Havener =

Mountain in Ellsworth Land, Antarctica

Location of Sentinel Range in Western Antarctica.

Sentinel Range map.

Mount Havener (78°27′S 84°37′W) is a mountain rising to 2,800 metres (9,200 ft) directly at the head of Guerrero Glacier, in the Doyran Heights of the Sentinel Range, in the Ellsworth Mountains of Antarctica. It was first mapped by the United States Geological Survey from surveys and U.S. Navy air photos, from 1957 to 1959, and was named by the Advisory Committee on Antarctic Names for Melvin C. Havener, a mechanic at South Pole Station in 1957.

== See also ==
- Mountains in Antarctica

== Maps ==
- Vinson Massif. Scale 1:250 000 topographic map. Reston, Virginia: US Geological Survey, 1988.
- Antarctic Digital Database (ADD). Scale 1:250000 topographic map of Antarctica. Scientific Committee on Antarctic Research (SCAR). Since 1993, regularly updated.
