= Dater Glacier =

Glacier in Antarctica

- Location of Sentinel Range in Western Antarctica

- Location within Antarctica
- Location: Ellsworth Land
- Coordinates: 78°17′S 84°35′W
- Length: 24 nmi (44 km; 28 mi)
- Width: 3 nmi (6 km; 3 mi)
- Thickness: unknown
- Terminus: Rutford Ice Stream
- Status: unknown

Central and southern Sentinel Range map.

The Dater Glacier is a steep valley glacier in Antarctica, 24 nautical miles (44 km; 28 mi) long and from 1 to 3 nautical miles (2 to 6 km; 1 to 3 mi) wide, flowing northeast in a sinuous course from the eastern slopes of the Vinson Massif between Sullivan Heights and Veregava Ridge to Rutford Ice Stream which borders the eastern flank of the Sentinel Range, Ellsworth Mountains. At the lower end the Dater Glacier coalesces with the terminus of the Ellen Glacier, the two emerging from the Sentinel Range as one stream just north of the Flowers Hills.

The glacier was discovered by U.S. Navy Squadron VX-6 on photographic flights of 14–15 December 1959, and mapped from these photographs by the United States Geological Survey. It was named by the Advisory Committee on Antarctic Names after Henry M. Dater, a historian on the staff of the U.S. Antarctic Projects Officer and the U.S. Naval Support Force Antarctica.

== Tributary glaciers ==
- Hansen Glacier
- Berisad Glacier
- Orizari Glacier
- Hinkley Glacier
- Strinava Glacier

== Maps ==
- Vinson Massif. Scale 1:250 000 topographic map. Reston, Virginia: US Geological Survey, 1988.
- Antarctic Digital Database (ADD). Scale 1:250000 topographic map of Antarctica. Scientific Committee on Antarctic Research (SCAR), 1993–2016.

== See also ==
- List of glaciers in the Antarctic
- Glaciology
