= Vakarel Saddle =

Saddle in the South Shetland Islands, Antarctica

Location of Smith Island in the South Shetland Islands.

Topographic map of Smith Island.

Vakarel Saddle (Bulgarian: Вакарелска седловина, ‘Vakarelska Sedlovina’ \va-ka-'rel-ska se-dlo-vi-'na\) is a crescent-shaped ice-covered saddle of elevation 1744 m in Imeon Range on Smith Island in the South Shetland Islands, Antarctica bounded by Antim Peak to the east-northeast, and Evlogi Peak to the southwest, and overlooking Chuprene Glacier to the northwest. The feature is named after the settlement of Vakarel in western Bulgaria.

== Location ==
The midpoint of the saddle is located at 62°59′07.5″S 62°31′49.5″W, which is 710 m southwest of Antim Peak, 5.59 km south by east of Markeli Point, 1.56 km northeast of Mount Foster, and 4.84 km north of Ivan Asen Point (Bulgarian mapping in 2009).

== Maps ==
- Chart of South Shetland including Coronation Island, &c. from the exploration of the sloop Dove in the years 1821 and 1822 by George Powell Commander of the same. Scale ca. 1:200000. London: Laurie, 1822.
- L.L. Ivanov. Antarctica: Livingston Island and Greenwich, Robert, Snow and Smith Islands. Scale 1:120000 topographic map. Troyan: Manfred Wörner Foundation, 2010. ISBN 978-954-92032-9-5 (First edition 2009. ISBN 978-954-92032-6-4)
- South Shetland Islands: Smith and Low Islands. Scale 1:150000 topographic map No. 13677. British Antarctic Survey, 2009.
- Antarctic Digital Database (ADD). Scale 1:250000 topographic map of Antarctica. Scientific Committee on Antarctic Research (SCAR). Since 1993, regularly upgraded and updated.
- L.L. Ivanov. Antarctica: Livingston Island and Smith Island. Scale 1:100000 topographic map. Manfred Wörner Foundation, 2017. ISBN 978-619-90008-3-0
