= Pashuk Glacier =

Glacier in Antarctica

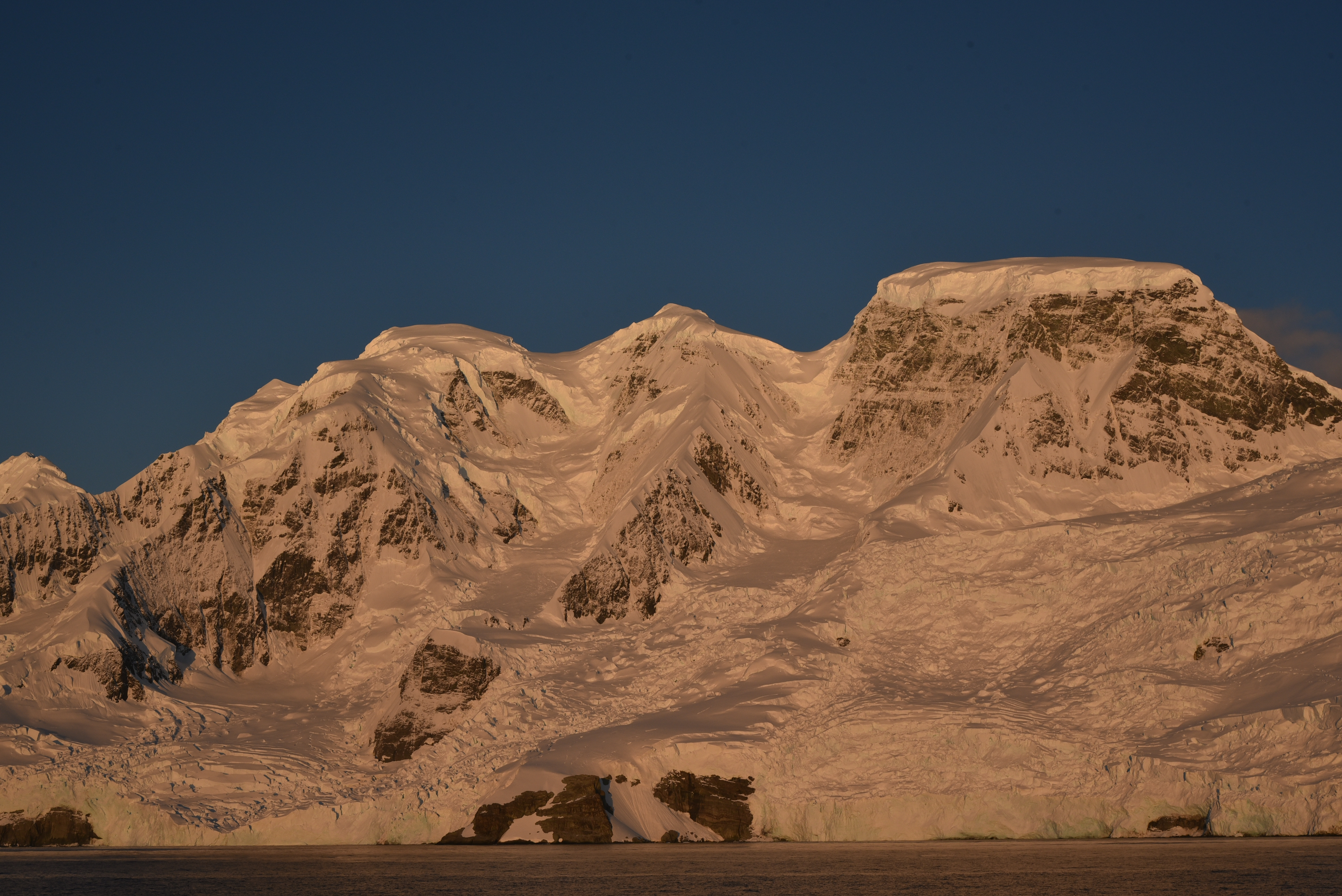
- Left to right Rupite, Pashuk and Krivodol Glaciers of Smith Island

- Location within South Shetland Islands Location within Antarctica
- Location: Smith Island; South Shetland Islands
- Coordinates: 62°59′45″S 62°30′00″W
- Length: 1.5 nautical miles (2.8 km; 1.7 mi)
- Width: 0.3 nautical miles (0.56 km; 0.35 mi)
- Thickness: unknown
- Terminus: Osmar Strait
- Status: unknown

Topographic map of Smith Island.

Pashuk Glacier (Bulgarian: ледник Пашук, romanized: lednik Pashuk, IPA: [ˈlɛdnik pɐˈʃuk]) is the steep 2.7 km long and 600 m wide glacier on the southeast side of Imeon Range, Smith Island in the South Shetland Islands, Antarctica, which is draining southeastwards from Vakarel Saddle between the side ridges descending from Antim Peak and Evlogi Peak and separating it from Krivodol Glacier to the north and Rupite Glacier to the south respectively, and flows into Osmar Strait southwest of Sredets Point.

The glacier is named after the Canadian Keri Pashuk, skipper of the sailing yacht Northanger which provided logistic support for the first ascent of the island's summit Mount Foster (2105 m) in 1996.

== Location ==
Pashuk Glacier is centred at 62°59′45″S 62°30′00″W. Bulgarian mapping in 2009 and 2010.

== See also ==
- List of glaciers in the Antarctic
- Glaciology

== Maps ==
- Chart of South Shetland including Coronation Island, &c. from the exploration of the sloop Dove in the years 1821 and 1822 by George Powell Commander of the same. Scale ca. 1:200000. London: Laurie, 1822.
- L.L. Ivanov. Antarctica: Livingston Island and Greenwich, Robert, Snow and Smith Islands. Scale 1:120000 topographic map. Troyan: Manfred Wörner Foundation, 2010. ISBN 978-954-92032-9-5 (First edition 2009. ISBN 978-954-92032-6-4)
- South Shetland Islands: Smith and Low Islands. Scale 1:150000 topographic map No. 13677. British Antarctic Survey, 2009.
- Antarctic Digital Database (ADD). Scale 1:250000 topographic map of Antarctica. Scientific Committee on Antarctic Research (SCAR). Since 1993, regularly upgraded and updated.
- L.L. Ivanov. Antarctica: Livingston Island and Smith Island. Scale 1:100000 topographic map. Manfred Wörner Foundation, 2017. ISBN 978-619-90008-3-0
