= Ivan Asen Point =

Rocky point in the South Shetland Islands, Antarctica

Location of Smith Island in the South Shetland Islands.

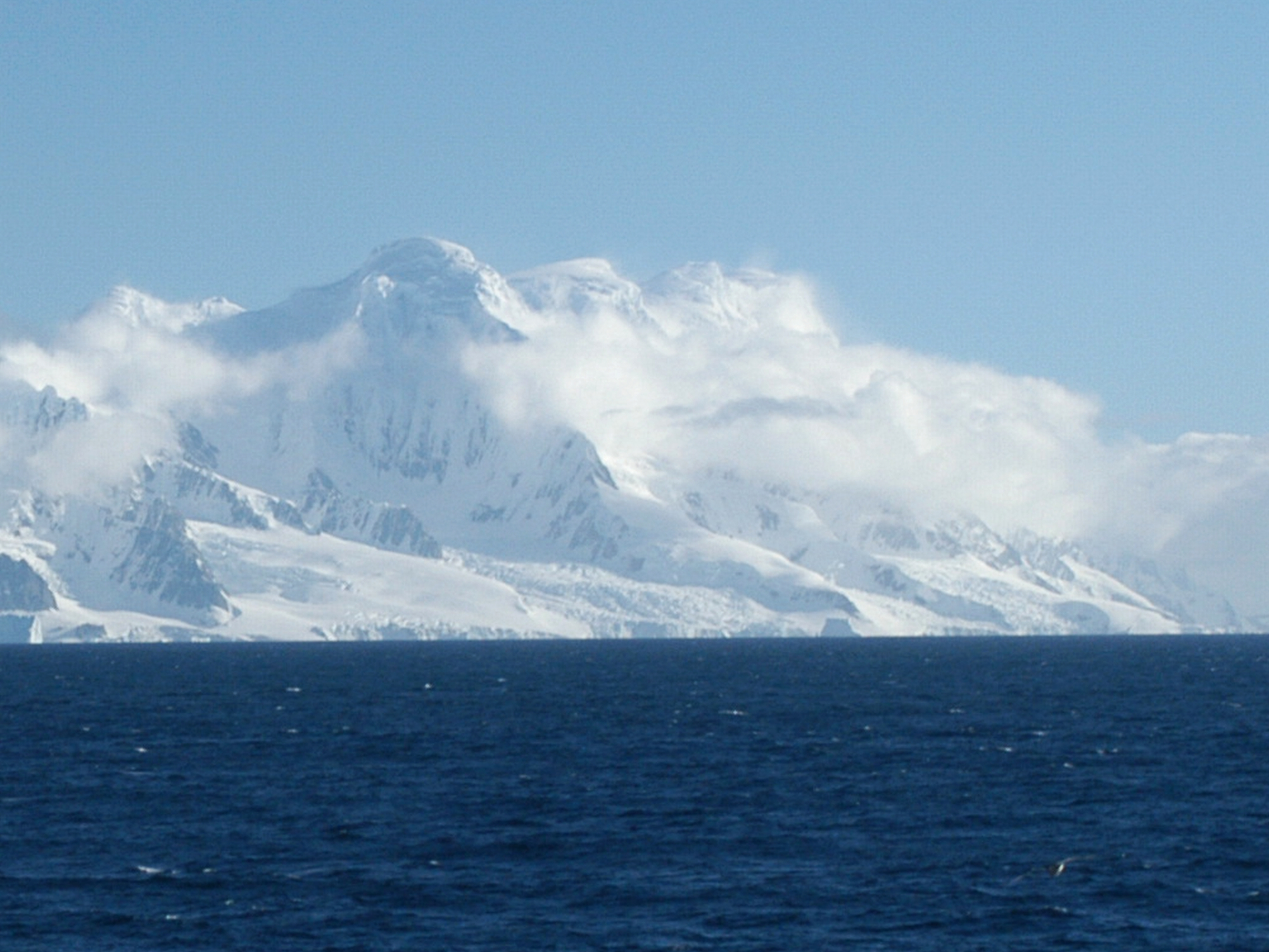
Ivan Asen Point and the adjacent Ivan Asen Cove surmounted by Mount Foster, from Osmar Strait.

Topographic map of Smith Island.

Ivan Asen Point (Bulgarian: Нос Иван Асен, ‘Nos Ivan Asen’ \'nos i-'van a-'sen\) is a narrow rocky point projecting 680 m into Osmar Strait from the southeast coast of Smith Island in the South Shetland Islands, Antarctica. It forms the southwest side of the entrance to Ivan Asen Cove and the northeast side of the entrance to Yarebitsa Cove, and separates the glacier termini of Dragoman Glacier to the north and Armira Glacier to the south.

The point is named after Czar Ivan Asen II of Bulgaria, 1218-1241 AD.

== Location ==
The point is located at 63°01′43″S 62°31′09″W which is 12.5 km northeast of Cape James, 20.5 km southwest of Cape Smith, 3.8 km south-southeast of the island's summit Mount Foster (2105 m), and 3.45 km southeast of Slaveykov Peak (Bulgarian mapping in 2009 and 2010).

== See also ==
- Smith Island
- List of Bulgarian toponyms in Antarctica

== Maps ==
- Chart of South Shetland including Coronation Island, &c. from the exploration of the sloop Dove in the years 1821 and 1822 by George Powell Commander of the same. Scale ca. 1:200000. London: Laurie, 1822.
- L.L. Ivanov. Antarctica: Livingston Island and Greenwich, Robert, Snow and Smith Islands. Scale 1:120000 topographic map. Troyan: Manfred Wörner Foundation, 2010. ISBN 978-954-92032-9-5 (First edition 2009. ISBN 978-954-92032-6-4)
- South Shetland Islands: Smith and Low Islands. Scale 1:150000 topographic map No. 13677. British Antarctic Survey, 2009.
- Antarctic Digital Database (ADD). Scale 1:250000 topographic map of Antarctica. Scientific Committee on Antarctic Research (SCAR). Since 1993, regularly upgraded and updated.
- L.L. Ivanov. Antarctica: Livingston Island and Smith Island. Scale 1:100000 topographic map. Manfred Wörner Foundation, 2017. ISBN 978-619-90008-3-0
