= Sredets Point =

Ice-covered, rock tipped point in the South Shetland Islands, Antarctica

Location of Smith Island in the South Shetland Islands

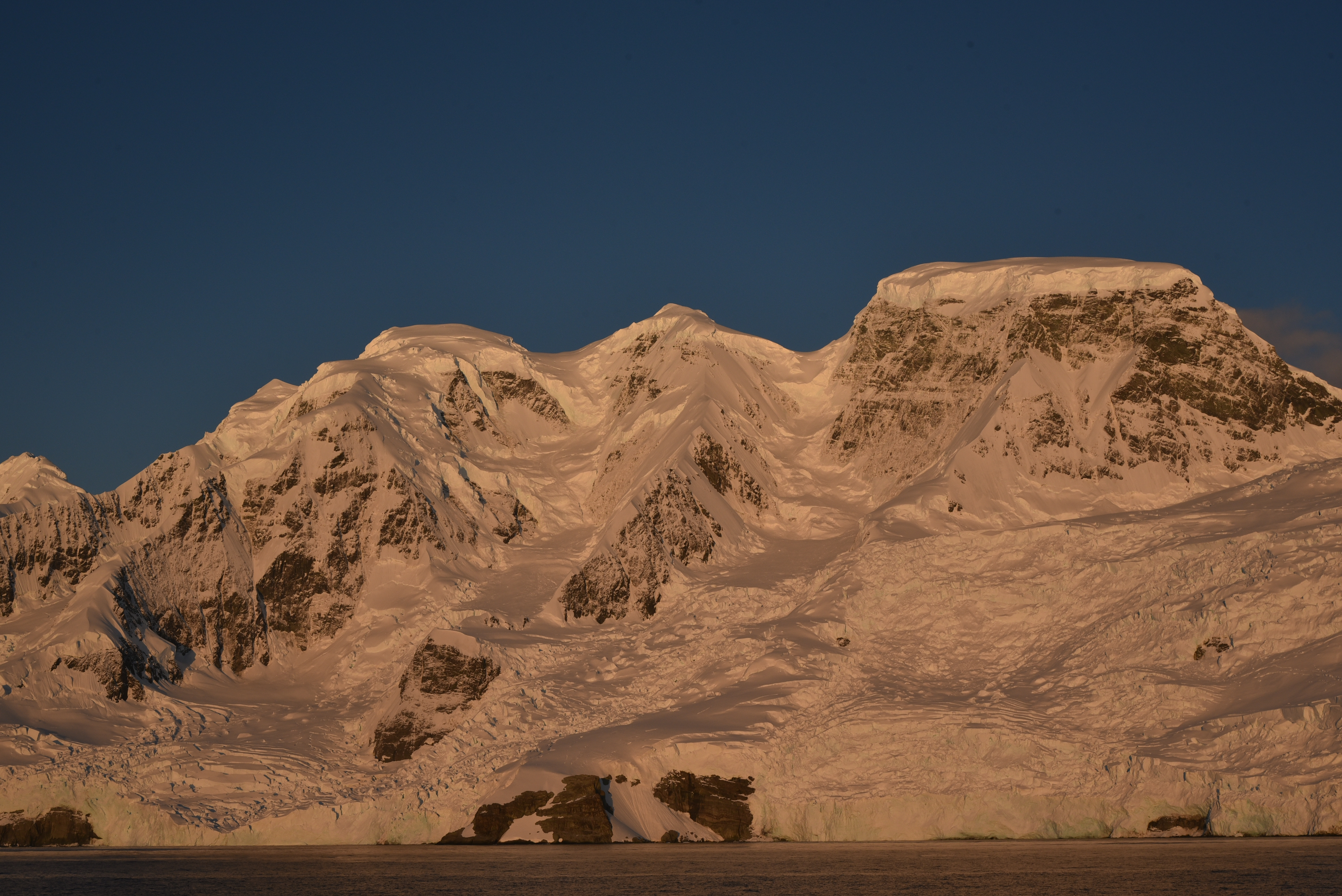
Sredets Point in the middle foreground, surmounted by Antim Peak

Topographic map of Smith Island

Sredets Point (Bulgarian: нос Средец, ‘Nos Sredets’ \'nos sre-'dets\) is the ice-covered point on the southeast coast of Smith Island in the South Shetland Islands, Antarctica, projecting 400 m into Osmar Strait and separating the glacier termini of Krivodol Glacier to the north and Pashuk Glacier to the south.

The point is named after the town of Sredets in Southeastern and the settlements of Sredets in Southern Bulgaria.

== Location ==
Sredets Point is located at 63°00′10.4″S 62°28′18″W, which is 16.9 km southwest of Cape Smith, 16.3 km northeast of Cape James and 3.4 km southeast of Antim Peak. Bulgarian mapping in 2009 and 2010.

== Maps ==
- Chart of South Shetland including Coronation Island, &c. from the exploration of the sloop Dove in the years 1821 and 1822 by George Powell Commander of the same. Scale ca. 1:200000. London: Laurie, 1822.
- L.L. Ivanov. Antarctica: Livingston Island and Greenwich, Robert, Snow and Smith Islands. Scale 1:120000 topographic map. Troyan: Manfred Wörner Foundation, 2010. ISBN 978-954-92032-9-5 (First edition 2009. ISBN 978-954-92032-6-4)
- South Shetland Islands: Smith and Low Islands. Scale 1:150000 topographic map No. 13677. British Antarctic Survey, 2009.
- Antarctic Digital Database (ADD). Scale 1:250000 topographic map of Antarctica. Scientific Committee on Antarctic Research (SCAR). Since 1993, regularly upgraded and updated.
- L.L. Ivanov. Antarctica: Livingston Island and Smith Island. Scale 1:100000 topographic map. Manfred Wörner Foundation, 2017. ISBN 978-619-90008-3-0
