= Varshets Saddle =

Saddle in the South Shetland Islands, Antarctica

Location of Smith Island in the South Shetland Islands.

Topographic map of Smith Island.

Varshets Saddle (Bulgarian: седловина Вършец, ‘Sedlovina Varshets’ \se-dlo-vi-'na v&r-'shets\) is a saddle of elevation 1087 m in Imeon Range on Smith Island in the South Shetland Islands, Antarctica bounded by Antim Peak to the south-southwest and Slatina Peak to the east. Overlooking Chuprene Glacier to the northwest and Krivodol Glacier to the south and southeast. The feature is named after the town of Varshets in northwestern Bulgaria.

== Location ==
The midpoint of the saddle is located at 62°58′13″S 62°30′31″W (Bulgarian early mapping in 2009).

== Maps ==
- Chart of South Shetland including Coronation Island, &c. from the exploration of the sloop Dove in the years 1821 and 1822 by George Powell Commander of the same. Scale ca. 1:200000. London: Laurie, 1822.
- L.L. Ivanov. Antarctica: Livingston Island and Greenwich, Robert, Snow and Smith Islands. Scale 1:120000 topographic map. Troyan: Manfred Wörner Foundation, 2010. ISBN 978-954-92032-9-5 (First edition 2009. ISBN 978-954-92032-6-4)
- South Shetland Islands: Smith and Low Islands. Scale 1:150000 topographic map No. 13677. British Antarctic Survey, 2009.
- Antarctic Digital Database (ADD). Scale 1:250000 topographic map of Antarctica. Scientific Committee on Antarctic Research (SCAR). Since 1993, regularly upgraded and updated.
- L.L. Ivanov. Antarctica: Livingston Island and Smith Island. Scale 1:100000 topographic map. Manfred Wörner Foundation, 2017. ISBN 978-619-90008-3-0
