= Dragoman Glacier =

Glacier in Antarctica

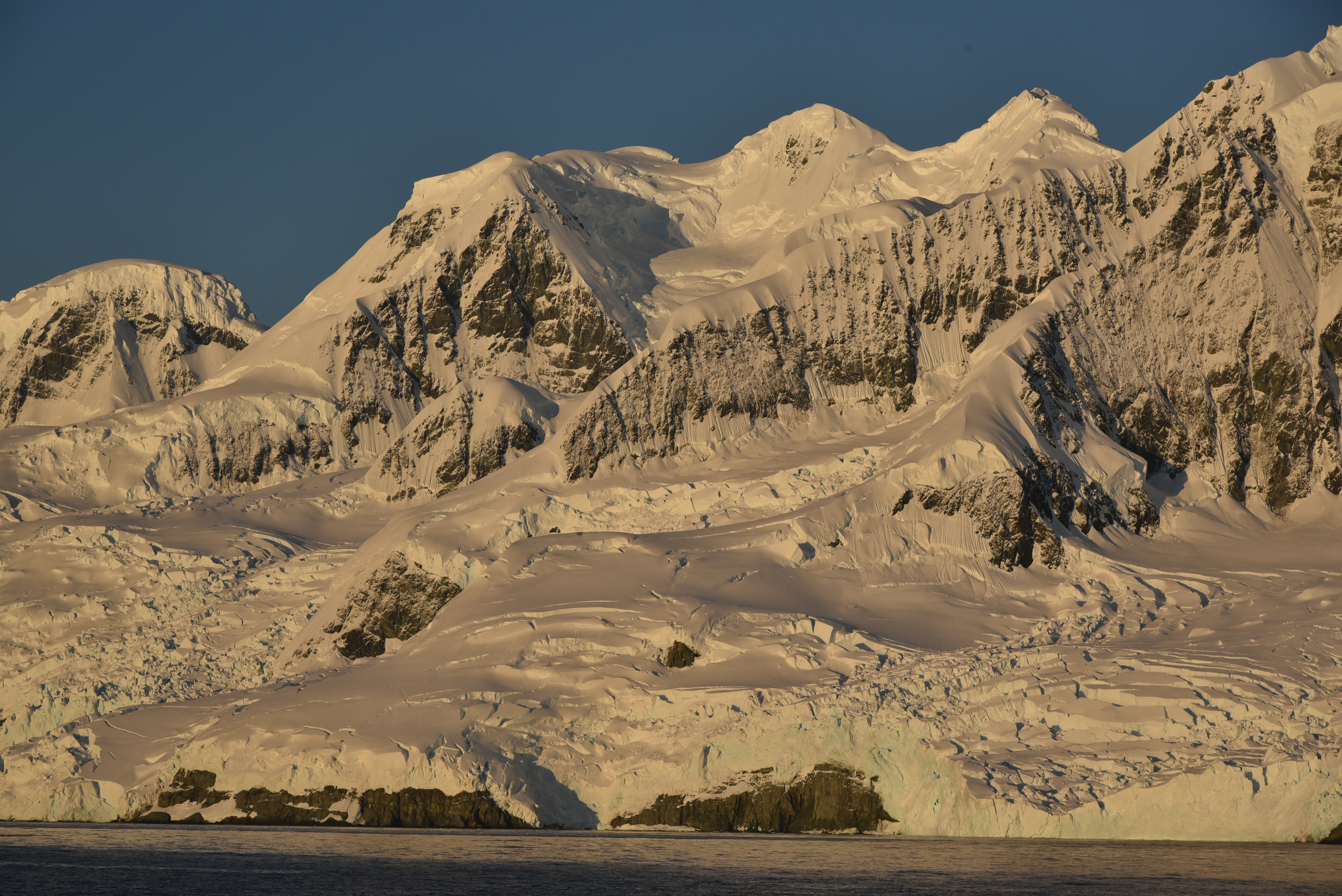
- Left to right Armira, Dragoman, Landreth and Rupite Glaciers of Smith Island

- Location within South Shetland Islands Location within Antarctica
- Location: Smith Island; South Shetland Islands
- Coordinates: 63°00′56″S 62°32′35″W
- Length: 1.4 nautical miles (2.6 km; 1.6 mi)
- Thickness: unknown
- Terminus: Ivan Asen Cove
- Status: unknown

Topographic map of Smith Island.

Dragoman Glacier (Bulgarian: ледник Драгоман, romanized: lednik Dragoman, IPA: [ˈlɛdniɡ drɐɡoˈman]) is a 1.4 nautical miles (2.6 km; 1.6 mi) long glacier on Smith Island, South Shetland Islands draining the southeast slopes of Imeon Range southeast of Zavet Saddle and south of the summit Mount Foster. It is situated southeast of Bistra Glacier, southwest of Landreth Glacier and northeast of Armira Glacier, and flows southeastward into Ivan Asen Cove, Osmar Strait. Bulgarian early mapping in 2009. The glacier is named after the town of Dragoman in western Bulgaria.

== Maps ==
- Chart of South Shetland including Coronation Island, &c. from the exploration of the sloop Dove in the years 1821 and 1822 by George Powell Commander of the same. Scale ca. 1:200000. London: Laurie, 1822.
- L.L. Ivanov. Antarctica: Livingston Island and Greenwich, Robert, Snow and Smith Islands. Scale 1:120000 topographic map. Troyan: Manfred Wörner Foundation, 2010. ISBN 978-954-92032-9-5 (First edition 2009. ISBN 978-954-92032-6-4)
- South Shetland Islands: Smith and Low Islands. Scale 1:150000 topographic map No. 13677. British Antarctic Survey, 2009.
- Antarctic Digital Database (ADD). Scale 1:250000 topographic map of Antarctica. Scientific Committee on Antarctic Research (SCAR). Since 1993, regularly upgraded and updated.
- L.L. Ivanov. Antarctica: Livingston Island and Smith Island. Scale 1:100000 topographic map. Manfred Wörner Foundation, 2017. ISBN 978-619-90008-3-0

== See also ==
- List of glaciers in the Antarctic
- Glaciology
