= Bistra Glacier =

Glacier in Antarctica

Biistra Glacier
- Location of Smith Island in the South Shetland Islands

- Location within South Shetland Islands Location within Antarctica
- Location: Smith Island; South Shetland Islands
- Coordinates: 62°59′50″S 62°34′45″W
- Length: 1 nautical mile (1.9 km; 1.2 mi)
- Width: 0.4 nautical miles (0.74 km; 0.46 mi)
- Thickness: unknown
- Terminus: Ross Ice Shelf
- Status: unknown

Topographic map of Smith Island

Bistra Glacier (Bulgarian: ледник Бистра, romanized: lednik Bistra, IPA: [ˈlɛdniɡ ˈbistrɐ]) is 1 nautical mile (1.9 km; 1.2 mi) long and 0.4 nautical miles (0.74 km; 0.46 mi) wide glacier on the northwest side of Imeon Range on Smith Island in the South Shetland Islands, Antarctica. It is situated southwest of Chuprene Glacier and northwest of Dragoman Glacier, drains the west slopes of Mount Foster and the north slopes of Slaveykov Peak, and flows northwestwards of Zavet Saddle to enter Drake Passage south of Garmen Point.

The glacier is named after the settlements of Bistra in northeastern Bulgaria.

== Location ==
Bistra Glacier is located at 62°59′50″S 62°34′45″W. Bulgarian mapping in 2009.

== See also ==
- List of glaciers in the Antarctic
- Glaciology

== Maps ==
- Chart of South Shetland including Coronation Island, &c. from the exploration of the sloop Dove in the years 1821 and 1822 by George Powell Commander of the same. Scale ca. 1:200000. London: Laurie, 1822.
- L.L. Ivanov. Antarctica: Livingston Island and Greenwich, Robert, Snow and Smith Islands. Scale 1:120000 topographic map. Troyan: Manfred Wörner Foundation, 2010. ISBN 978-954-92032-9-5 (First edition 2009. ISBN 978-954-92032-6-4)
- South Shetland Islands: Smith and Low Islands. Scale 1:150000 topographic map No. 13677. British Antarctic Survey, 2009.
- Antarctic Digital Database (ADD). Scale 1:250000 topographic map of Antarctica. Scientific Committee on Antarctic Research (SCAR). Since 1993, regularly upgraded and updated.
- L.L. Ivanov. Antarctica: Livingston Island and Smith Island. Scale 1:100000 topographic map. Manfred Wörner Foundation, 2017. ISBN 978-619-90008-3-0
