= Tsarigrad Peak =

Mountain in South Shetland Islands, Antarctica

Location of Smith Island in the South Shetland Islands.

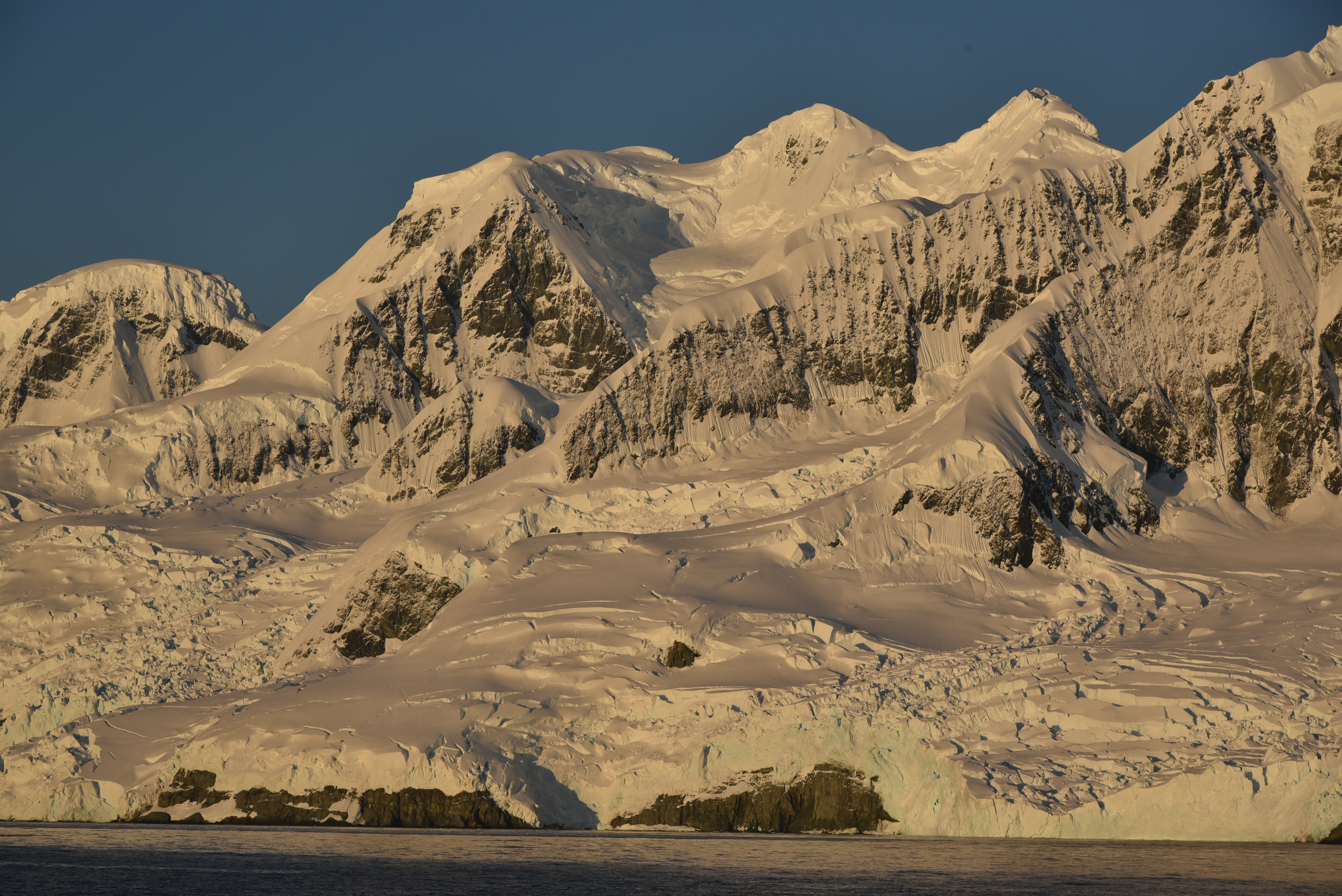
South-central Imeon Range of Smith Island: left to right Riggs Peak, Neofit Peak, Tsarigrad Peak and Slaveykov Peak

Topographic map of Smith Island.

Tsarigrad Peak (Bulgarian: Връх Цариград, romanized: vrah Tsarigrad, IPA: [ˈvrɤx ˈt͡sariɡrɐt]) is a sharp, ice-covered peak rising to 1689 metres in the Imeon Range on Smith Island in the South Shetland Islands, Antarctica. It overlooks Armira Glacier to the southeast.

The peak is named after the 1876 Constantinople Conference (Tsarigrad is the Bulgarian name for Constantinople), during which the Great Powers that determined the Bulgarian ethnic borders in the second half of the 19th century.

== Location ==
Tsarigrad Peak is located at 63°00′53″S 62°34′42″W, approximately 2.5km southwest of the island's summit, Mount Foster, 550 m south of Slaveykov Peak, and 600 m northeast of Neofit Peak. The peak was mapped by Bulgarian teams in 2009.

== Maps ==
- Chart of South Shetland including Coronation Island, &c from the exploration of the sloop Dove in the years 1821 and 1822 by George Powell, Commander of the same. Scale ca. 1:200000. London: Laurie, 1822.
- L.L. Ivanov. Antarctica: Livingston Island and Greenwich, Robert, Snow, and Smith Islands. Scale 1:120000 topographic map. Troyan: Manfred Wörner Foundation, 2010. ISBN 978-954-92032-9-5 (First edition 2009. ISBN 978-954-92032-6-4)
- South Shetland Islands: Smith and Low Islands. Scale 1:150000 topographic map No. 13677. British Antarctic Survey, 2009.
- Antarctic Digital Database (ADD). Scale 1:250000 topographic map of Antarctica. Scientific Committee on Antarctic Research (SCAR). Since 1993, regularly upgraded and updated.
- L.L. Ivanov. Antarctica: Livingston Island and Smith Island. Scale 1:100000 topographic map. Manfred Wörner Foundation, 2017. ISBN 978-619-90008-3-0
