= Slatina Peak =

Peak in the South Shetland Islands, Antarctica

Coordinates: 62°58′08″S 62°29′30″W

Location of Smith Island in the South Shetland Islands.

Topographic map of Smith Island.

Slatina Peak (Bulgarian: връх Слатина, romanized: vrah Slatina, IPA: [ˈvrɤx ˈsɫatinɐ]) is a peak rising to 1691 m in Imeon Range on Smith Island, South Shetland Islands. Situated 2 km northeast of Antim Peak, to which it is linked by Varshets Saddle, 4.09 km east by south of Villagra Point, and 1.9 km south of Drinov Peak. Overlooking the upper part of Chuprene Glacier to the northwest, and Krivodol Glacier to the southwest and south. Bulgarian early mapping in 2009. Named after the Bulgarian settlements of Slatina in Montana, Lovech, Plovdiv, Silistra and Sofia regions (the last one now part of the city of Sofia).

== Maps ==
- Chart of South Shetland including Coronation Island, &c. from the exploration of the sloop Dove in the years 1821 and 1822 by George Powell Commander of the same. Scale ca. 1:200000. London: Laurie, 1822.
- L.L. Ivanov. Antarctica: Livingston Island and Greenwich, Robert, Snow and Smith Islands. Scale 1:120000 topographic map. Troyan: Manfred Wörner Foundation, 2010. ISBN 978-954-92032-9-5 (First edition 2009. ISBN 978-954-92032-6-4)
- South Shetland Islands: Smith and Low Islands. Scale 1:150000 topographic map No. 13677. British Antarctic Survey, 2009.
- Antarctic Digital Database (ADD). Scale 1:250000 topographic map of Antarctica. Scientific Committee on Antarctic Research (SCAR). Since 1993, regularly upgraded and updated.
- L.L. Ivanov. Antarctica: Livingston Island and Smith Island. Scale 1:100000 topographic map. Manfred Wörner Foundation, 2017. ISBN 978-619-90008-3-0
