= Riggs Peak =

Peak in the South Shetland Islands

Coordinates: 63°02′08″S 62°36′50″W

Location of Smith Island in the South Shetland Islands.

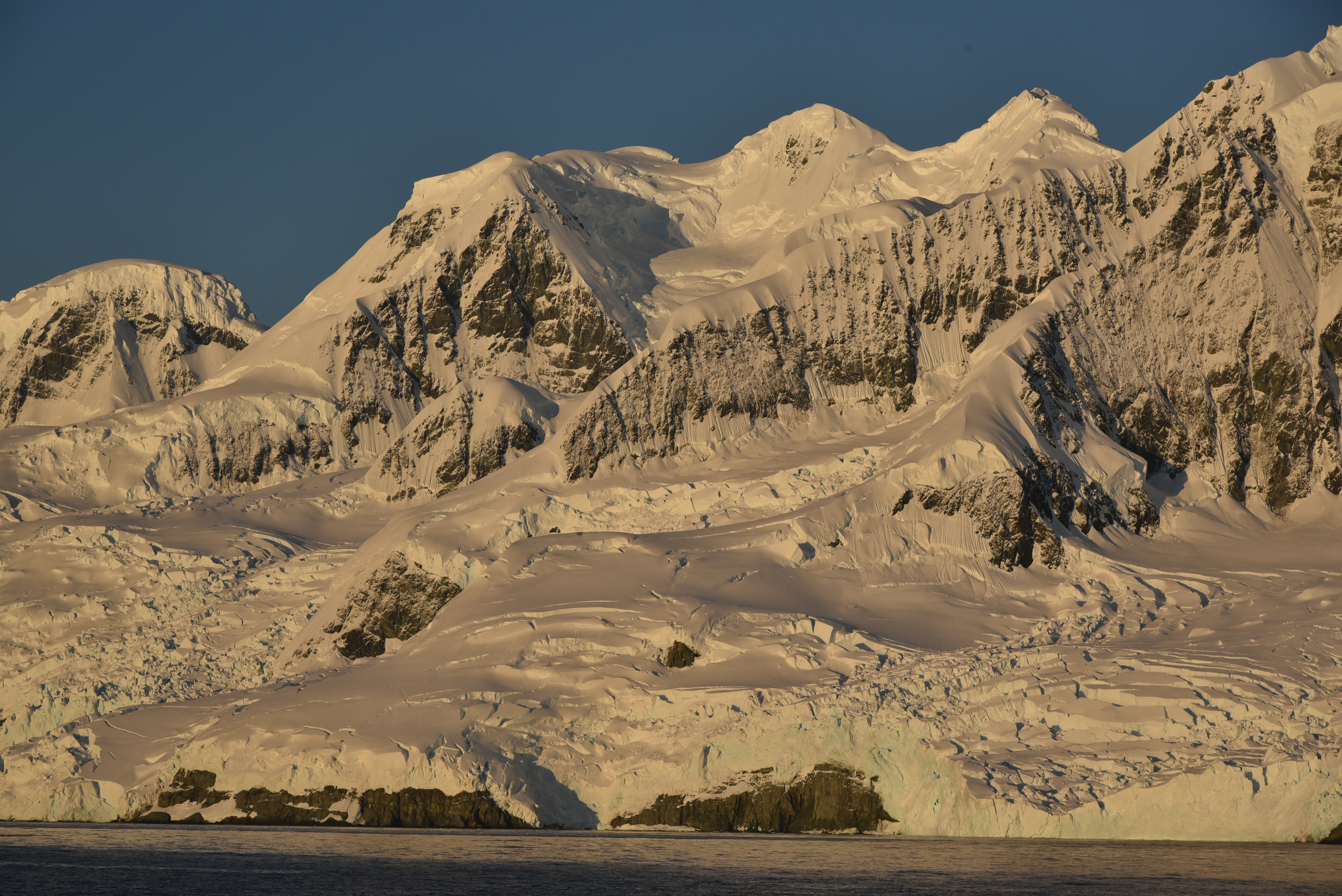
South-central Imeon Range of Smith Island: left to right Riggs Peak, Neofit Peak, Tsarigrad Peak and Slaveykov Peak

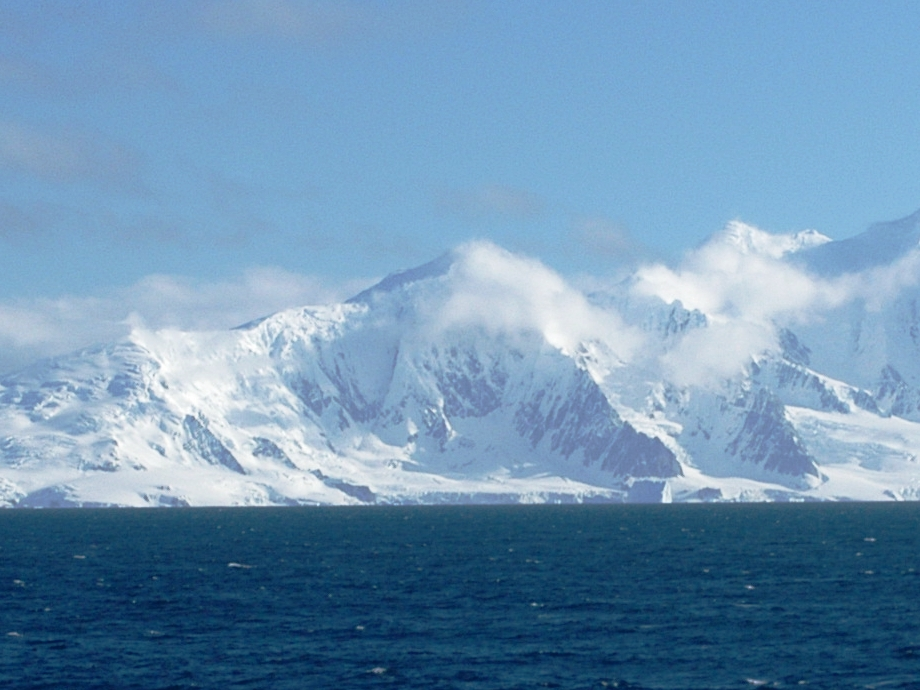
Riggs Peak

Topographic map of Smith Island.

Riggs Peak (Bulgarian: връх Ригс, romanized: vrah Riggs, IPA: [ˈvrɤx ˈriks]) is a peak rising to 1,601 m in Imeon Range on Smith Island, South Shetland Islands. It is situated 2.38 km southwest of Neofit Peak, 5.4 km southwest of the summit Mount Foster, and 8.6 km northeast of Cape James. It overlooks Letnitsa Glacier to the south, and Gramada Glacier to the east. It was mapped by Bulgaria in 2009. The peak was named after the American missionary and linguist Elias Riggs (1810–1901) who contributed greatly to the Bulgarian National Revival, and organized the first translation, printing and dissemination of the Bible in modern Bulgarian language.

== Maps ==
- Chart of South Shetland including Coronation Island, &c. from the exploration of the sloop Dove in the years 1821 and 1822 by George Powell Commander of the same. Scale ca. 1:200000. London: Laurie, 1822.
- L.L. Ivanov. Antarctica: Livingston Island and Greenwich, Robert, Snow and Smith Islands. Scale 1:120000 topographic map. Troyan: Manfred Wörner Foundation, 2010. ISBN 978-954-92032-9-5 (First edition 2009. ISBN 978-954-92032-6-4)
- South Shetland Islands: Smith and Low Islands. Scale 1:150000 topographic map No. 13677. British Antarctic Survey, 2009.
- Antarctic Digital Database (ADD). Scale 1:250000 topographic map of Antarctica. Scientific Committee on Antarctic Research (SCAR). Since 1993, regularly upgraded and updated.
- L.L. Ivanov. Antarctica: Livingston Island and Smith Island. Scale 1:100000 topographic map. Manfred Wörner Foundation, 2017. ISBN 978-619-90008-3-0
