= Zavet Saddle =

Saddle in the South Shetland Islands, Antarctica

Location of Smith Island in the South Shetland Islands.

Topographic map of Smith Island.

Zavet Saddle (Bulgarian: седловина Завет, ‘Sedlovina Zavet’ \se-dlo-vi-'na 'za-vet\) is a saddle of elevation 1350 m in Imeon Range on Smith Island, South Shetland Islands bounded by Slaveykov Peak to the southwest and the summit Mount Foster to the northeast. Overlooking Dragoman Glacier to the southeast and Bistra Glacier to the northwest. The feature is named after the town of Zavet in northeastern Bulgaria.

== Location ==
The saddle is located at 63°00′26″S 62°33′37″W (Bulgarian mapping in 2009).

== Maps ==
- Chart of South Shetland including Coronation Island, &c. from the exploration of the sloop Dove in the years 1821 and 1822 by George Powell Commander of the same. Scale ca. 1:200000. London: Laurie, 1822.
- L.L. Ivanov. Antarctica: Livingston Island and Greenwich, Robert, Snow and Smith Islands. Scale 1:120000 topographic map. Troyan: Manfred Wörner Foundation, 2010. ISBN 978-954-92032-9-5 (First edition 2009. ISBN 978-954-92032-6-4)
- South Shetland Islands: Smith and Low Islands. Scale 1:150000 topographic map No. 13677. British Antarctic Survey, 2009.
- Antarctic Digital Database (ADD). Scale 1:250000 topographic map of Antarctica. Scientific Committee on Antarctic Research (SCAR). Since 1993, regularly upgraded and updated.
- L.L. Ivanov. Antarctica: Livingston Island and Smith Island. Scale 1:100000 topographic map. Manfred Wörner Foundation, 2017. ISBN 978-619-90008-3-0
