= Armira Glacier =

Glacier in Antarctica

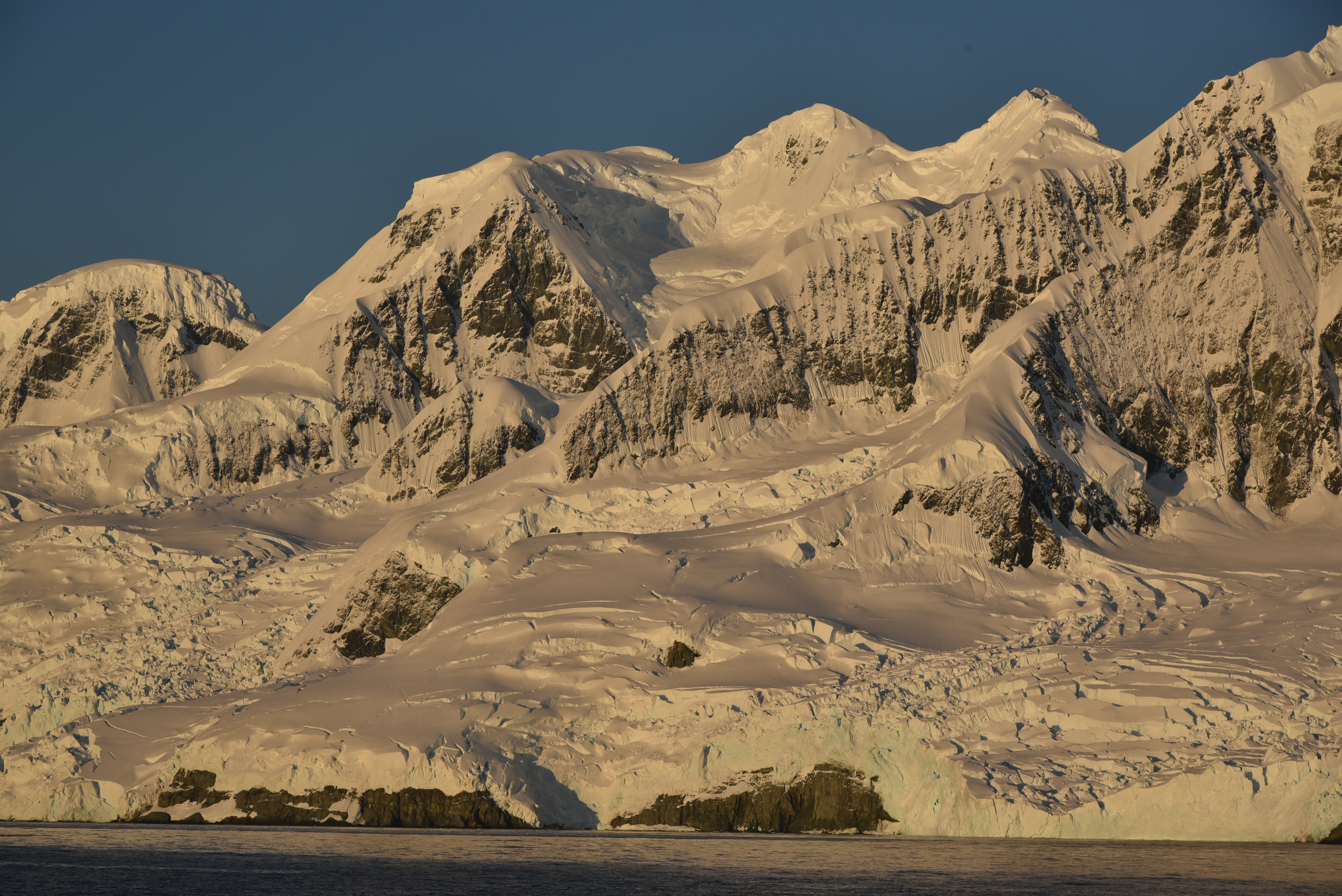
- Left to right Armira Glacier, Dragoman, Landreth and Rupite Glaciers of Smith Island

- Location within South Shetland Islands Location within Antarctica
- Location: Smith Island; South Shetland Islands
- Coordinates: 63°01′25″S 62°33′00″W
- Length: 1.6 nautical miles (3.0 km; 1.8 mi)
- Terminus: Yarebitsa Cove

Topographic map of Smith Island.

Armira Glacier (Bulgarian: ледник Армира, romanized: lednik Armira, IPA: [ˈlɛdnik ɐrˈmirɐ]) is a 1.6 nautical miles (3.0 km; 1.8 mi) long glacier on Smith Island in the South Shetland Islands, Antarctica draining the southeast slopes of Imeon Range southeast of Slaveykov Peak and east of Neofit Peak. It is situated southwest of Dragoman Glacier and northeast of Gramada Glacier, and flows southeastward into Yarebitsa Cove on Osmar Strait. Bulgarian early mapping in 2009. The glacier is named after Armira River in southeastern Bulgaria.

== See also ==
- List of glaciers in the Antarctic
- Glaciology

== Maps ==
- Chart of South Shetland including Coronation Island, &c. from the exploration of the sloop Dove in the years 1821 and 1822 by George Powell Commander of the same. Scale ca. 1:200000. London: Laurie, 1822.
- L.L. Ivanov. Antarctica: Livingston Island and Greenwich, Robert, Snow and Smith Islands. Scale 1:120000 topographic map. Troyan: Manfred Wörner Foundation, 2010. ISBN 978-954-92032-9-5 (First edition 2009. ISBN 978-954-92032-6-4)
- South Shetland Islands: Smith and Low Islands. Scale 1:150000 topographic map No. 13677. British Antarctic Survey, 2009.
- Antarctic Digital Database (ADD). Scale 1:250000 topographic map of Antarctica. Scientific Committee on Antarctic Research (SCAR). Since 1993, regularly upgraded and updated.
- L.L. Ivanov. Antarctica: Livingston Island and Smith Island. Scale 1:100000 topographic map. Manfred Wörner Foundation, 2017. ISBN 978-619-90008-3-0
