= Krivodol Glacier =

Glacier in Antarctica

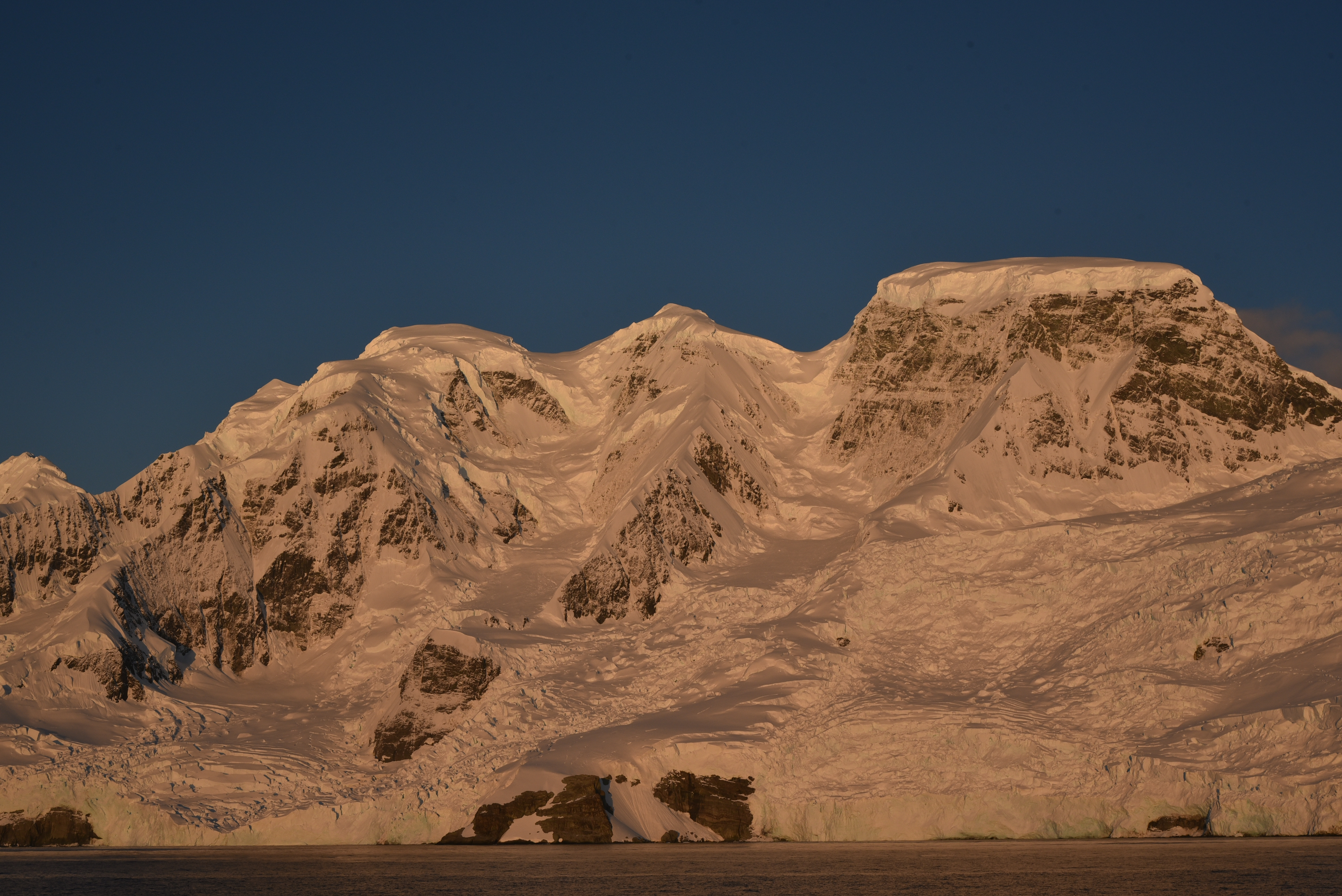
- Left to right Rupite, Pashuk and Krivodol Glaciers of Smith Island

- Location within South Shetland Islands Location within Antarctica
- Location: Smith Island; South Shetland Islands
- Coordinates: 62°58′55″S 62°29′25″W
- Length: 2 nautical miles (3.7 km; 2.3 mi)
- Thickness: unknown
- Terminus: Osmar Strait
- Status: unknown

Topographic map of Smith Island.

Krivodol Glacier (Bulgarian: ледник Криводол, romanized: lednik Krivodol, IPA: [ˈlɛdnik krivoˈdɔɫ]) is a 3.8 km long glacier on Smith Island, South Shetland Islands in Antarctica draining the southeast slopes of Imeon Range northeast and east of Antim Peak, southeast of Varshets Saddle and south of Slatina Peak. It is situated southwest of Ovech Glacier and northeast of Pashuk Glacier, and flows southeastward into Osmar Strait northeast of Sredets Point. Bulgarian early mapping in 2009. The glacier is named after the town of Krivodol in northwestern Bulgaria.

== See also ==
- List of glaciers in the Antarctic
- Glaciology

== Maps ==
- Chart of South Shetland including Coronation Island, &c. from the exploration of the sloop Dove in the years 1821 and 1822 by George Powell Commander of the same. Scale ca. 1:200000. London: Laurie, 1822.
- L.L. Ivanov. Antarctica: Livingston Island and Greenwich, Robert, Snow and Smith Islands. Scale 1:120000 topographic map. Troyan: Manfred Wörner Foundation, 2010. ISBN 978-954-92032-9-5 (First edition 2009. ISBN 978-954-92032-6-4)
- South Shetland Islands: Smith and Low Islands. Scale 1:150000 topographic map No. 13677. British Antarctic Survey, 2009.
- Antarctic Digital Database (ADD). Scale 1:250000 topographic map of Antarctica. Scientific Committee on Antarctic Research (SCAR). Since 1993, regularly upgraded and updated.
- L.L. Ivanov. Antarctica: Livingston Island and Smith Island. Scale 1:100000 topographic map. Manfred Wörner Foundation, 2017. ISBN 978-619-90008-3-0
