= Neofit Peak =

Mountain in Smith Island, South Shetland Islands, Antarctica

Coordinates: 63°01′08.5″S 62°35′03″W

Location of Smith Island in the South Shetland Islands.

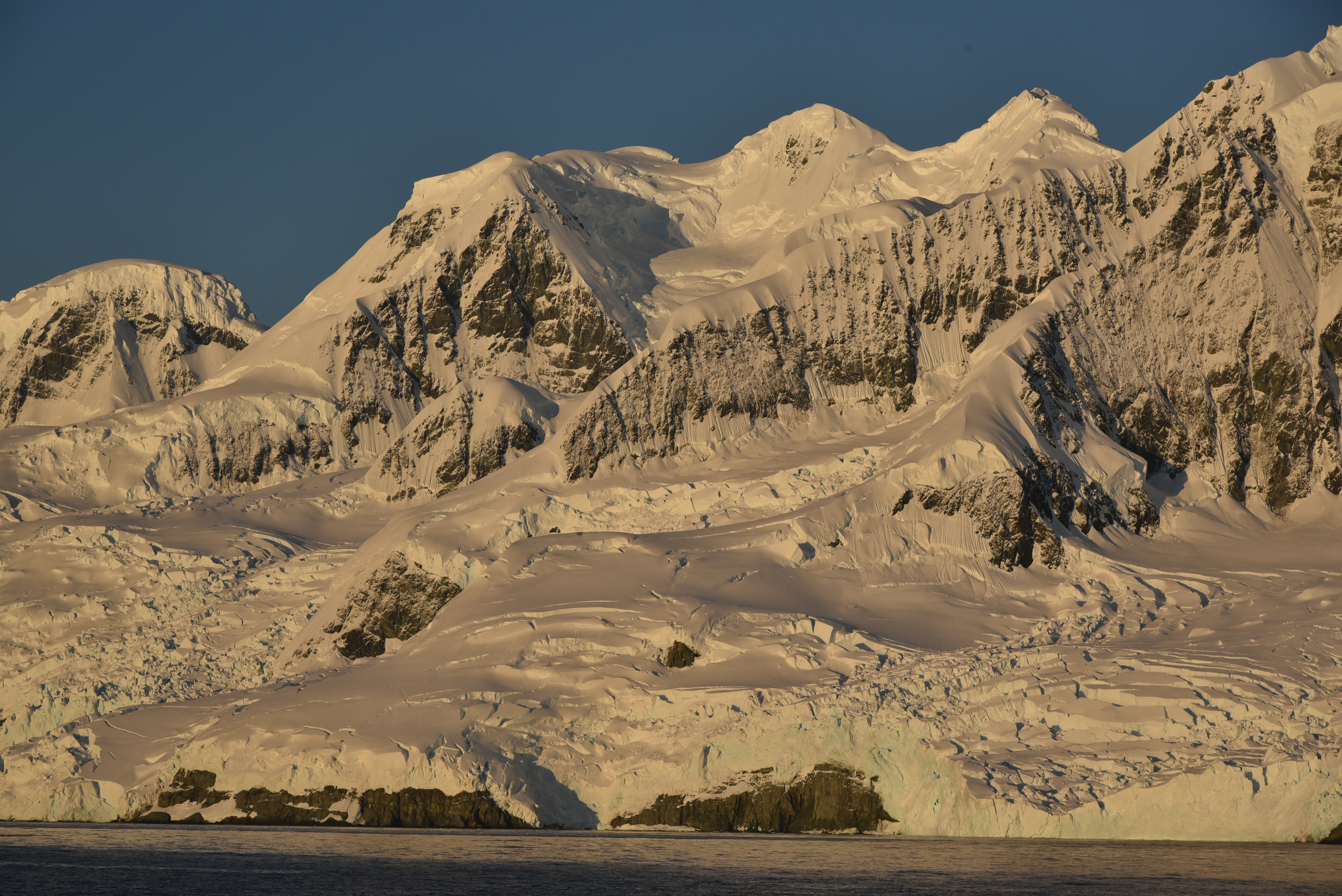
South-central Imeon Range of Smith Island: left to right Riggs Peak, Neofit Peak, Tsarigrad Peak and Slaveykov Peak

Topographic map of Smith Island.

Neofit Peak (Bulgarian: връх Неофит, romanized: vrah Neofit, IPA: [ˈvrɤx nɛˈɔfit]) is an ice-covered peak rising to 1657 m in Imeon Range on Smith Island in the South Shetland Islands, Antarctica. Situated 1.12 km south-southwest of Slaveykov Peak, 3.1 km southwest of the summit Mount Foster, 2.38 km northeast of Riggs Peak and 10.98 km northeast of Cape James. Overlooking Gramada Glacier to the south, and Armira Glacier to the east and southeast. Bulgarian early mapping in 2009. Named after the Bulgarian monk, scholar and artist Neofit Rilski (1793–1881) who translated the Bible into modern Bulgarian language.

== Maps ==
- Chart of South Shetland including Coronation Island, &c. from the exploration of the sloop Dove in the years 1821 and 1822 by George Powell Commander of the same. Scale ca. 1:200000. London: Laurie, 1822.
- L.L. Ivanov. Antarctica: Livingston Island and Greenwich, Robert, Snow and Smith Islands. Scale 1:120000 topographic map. Troyan: Manfred Wörner Foundation, 2010. ISBN 978-954-92032-9-5 (First edition 2009. ISBN 978-954-92032-6-4)
- South Shetland Islands: Smith and Low Islands. Scale 1:150000 topographic map No. 13677. British Antarctic Survey, 2009.
- Antarctic Digital Database (ADD). Scale 1:250000 topographic map of Antarctica. Scientific Committee on Antarctic Research (SCAR). Since 1993, regularly upgraded and updated.
- L.L. Ivanov. Antarctica: Livingston Island and Smith Island. Scale 1:100000 topographic map. Manfred Wörner Foundation, 2017. ISBN 978-619-90008-3-0
