= Slaveykov Peak =

Mountain in the South Shetland Islands, Antarctica

Location of Smith Island in the South Shetland Islands.

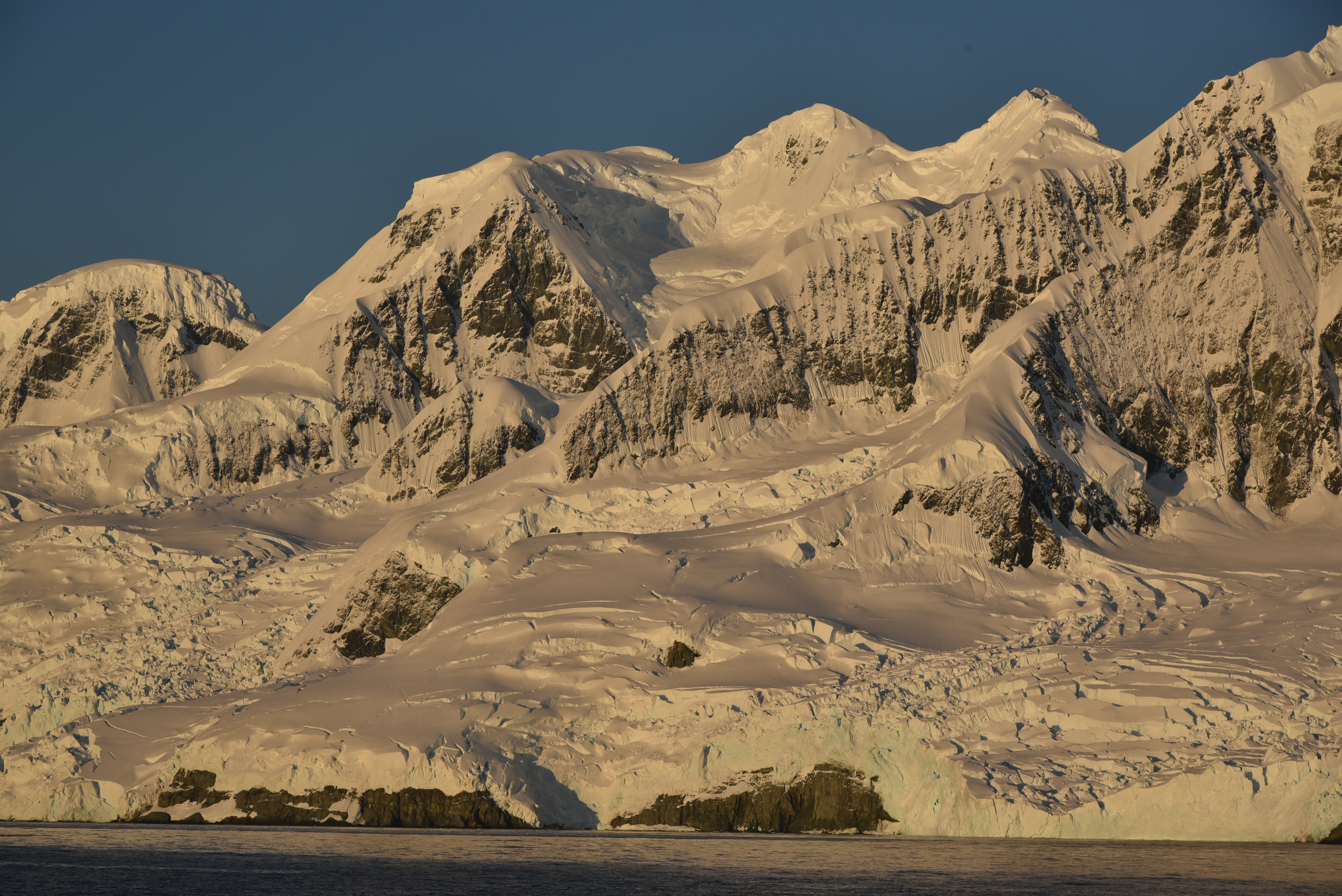
South-central Imeon Range of Smith Island: left to right Riggs Peak, Neofit Peak, Tsarigrad Peak and Slaveykov Peak

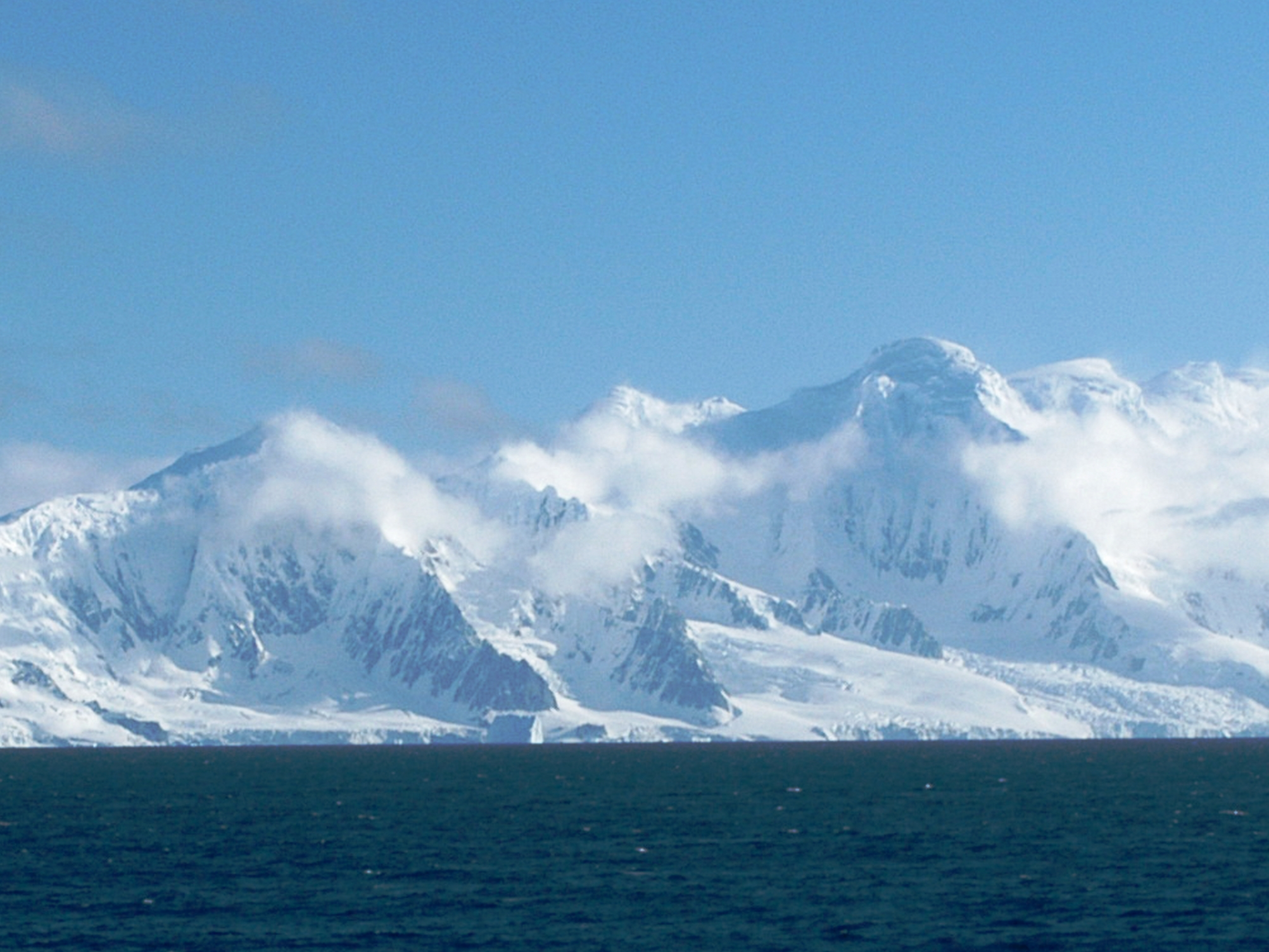
Slaveykov Peak with Mount Foster on the right.

Topographic map of Smith Island.

Slaveykov Peak (Bulgarian: Славейков Връх, romanized: Slaveykov vrah, IPA: [sɫɐˈvɛjkov ˈvrɤx]) (63°00′36″S 62°34′28″W) is a sharp peak rising to 1,674 m in Imeon Range on Smith Island in the South Shetland Islands, Antarctica. The feature is situated 2 km southwest of the summit Mount Foster, to which it is linked by Zavet Saddle, 1.12 km north-northeast of Neofit Peak, 2.4 km east of Lakatnik Point and 3.45 km northwest of Ivan Asen Point. It overlooks Armira Glacier to the southeast and Bistra Glacier to the north. Bulgarian mapping in 2009.

The peak is named after the prominent Bulgarian poet and pamphleteer Petko Slaveykov (1827–1895).

== See also ==
- Imeon Range
- List of Bulgarian toponyms in Antarctica

== Maps ==
- Chart of South Shetland including Coronation Island, &c. from the exploration of the sloop Dove in the years 1821 and 1822 by George Powell Commander of the same. Scale ca. 1:200000. London: Laurie, 1822.
- L.L. Ivanov. Antarctica: Livingston Island and Greenwich, Robert, Snow and Smith Islands. Scale 1:120000 topographic map. Troyan: Manfred Wörner Foundation, 2010. ISBN 978-954-92032-9-5 (First edition 2009. ISBN 978-954-92032-6-4)
- South Shetland Islands: Smith and Low Islands. Scale 1:150000 topographic map No. 13677. British Antarctic Survey, 2009.
- Antarctic Digital Database (ADD). Scale 1:250000 topographic map of Antarctica. Scientific Committee on Antarctic Research (SCAR). Since 1993, regularly upgraded and updated.
- L.L. Ivanov. Antarctica: Livingston Island and Smith Island. Scale 1:100000 topographic map. Manfred Wörner Foundation, 2017. ISBN 978-619-90008-3-0
