= Evlogi Peak =

Peak in the South Shetland Islands, Antarctica

Coordinates: 62°59′18″S 62°32′24″W

Location of Smith Island in the South Shetland Islands.

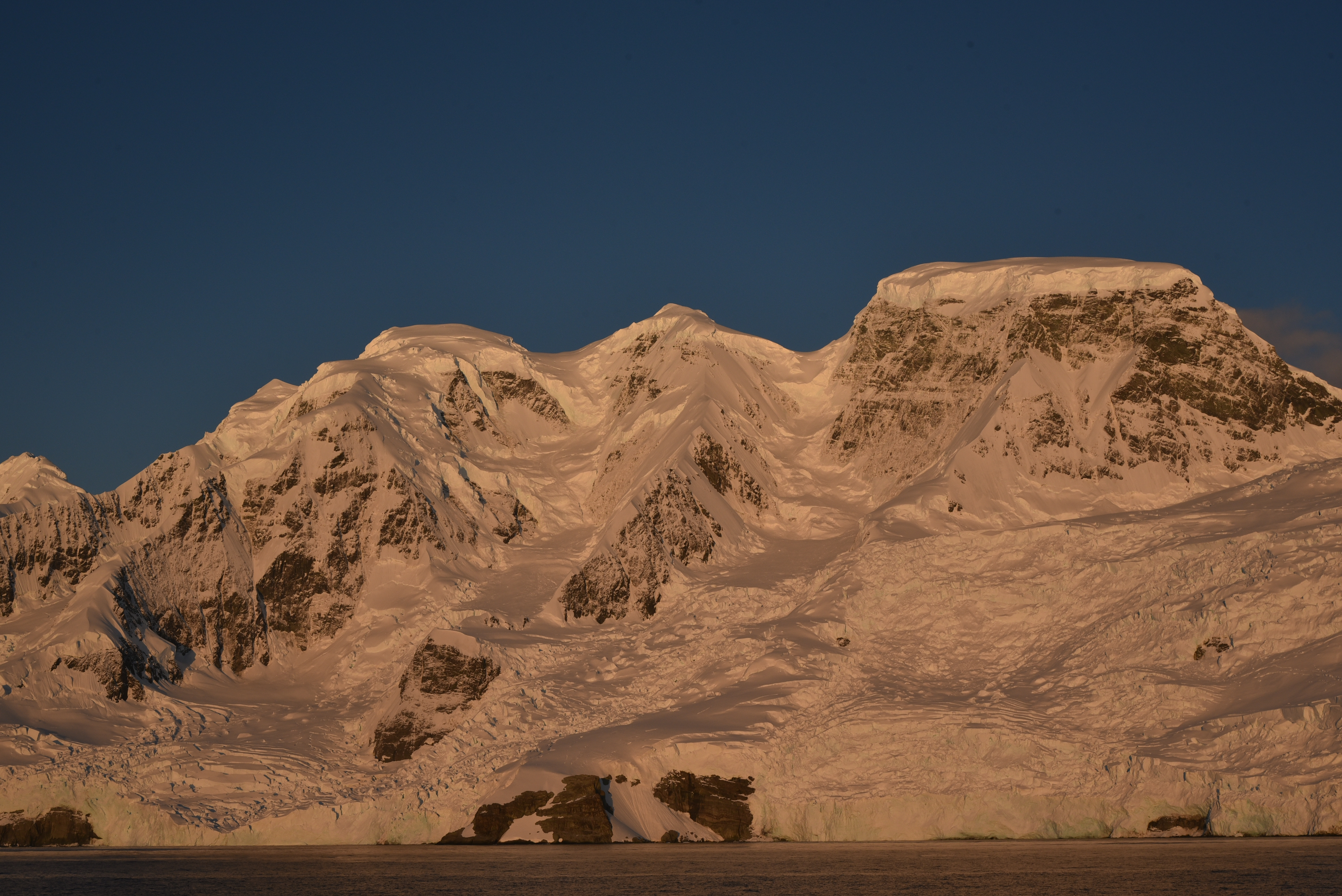
Evlogi Peak with Mount Foster on the left and Antim Peak on the right

Topographic map of Smith Island.

Evlogi Peak (Bulgarian: връх Евлоги, romanized: vrah Evlogi, IPA: [ˈvrɤx ɛˈvɫɔɡi]) is a peak rising to 2,024 m in Imeon Range on Smith Island, South Shetland Islands. It is situated 1 km north-northeast of the summit Mount Foster, and 1.3 km southwest of Antim Peak, with intervening saddles of elevation 1,899 and 1,744 m (Vakarel Saddle), respectively. Its prominence of 126 m makes it a distinct peak rather than a twin peak to Mount Foster as previously believed. It overlooks Chuprene Glacier to the northwest, Pashuk Glacier to the east and Rupite Glacier to the southeast. Bulgarian mapping in 2009. The peak was named after the Bulgarian financier, industrialist and philanthropist Evlogi Georgiev (1819–1897) whose endowment funded the construction of Sofia University’s main building.

== Maps ==
- Chart of South Shetland including Coronation Island, &c. from the exploration of the sloop Dove in the years 1821 and 1822 by George Powell Commander of the same. Scale ca. 1:200000. London: Laurie, 1822.
- L.L. Ivanov. Antarctica: Livingston Island and Greenwich, Robert, Snow and Smith Islands. Scale 1:120000 topographic map. Troyan: Manfred Wörner Foundation, 2010. ISBN 978-954-92032-9-5 (First edition 2009. ISBN 978-954-92032-6-4)
- South Shetland Islands: Smith and Low Islands. Scale 1:150000 topographic map No. 13677. British Antarctic Survey, 2009.
- Antarctic Digital Database (ADD). Scale 1:250000 topographic map of Antarctica. Scientific Committee on Antarctic Research (SCAR). Since 1993, regularly upgraded and updated.
- L.L. Ivanov. Antarctica: Livingston Island and Smith Island. Scale 1:100000 topographic map. Manfred Wörner Foundation, 2017. ISBN 978-619-90008-3-0
