= Rupite Glacier =

Glacier in Antarctica

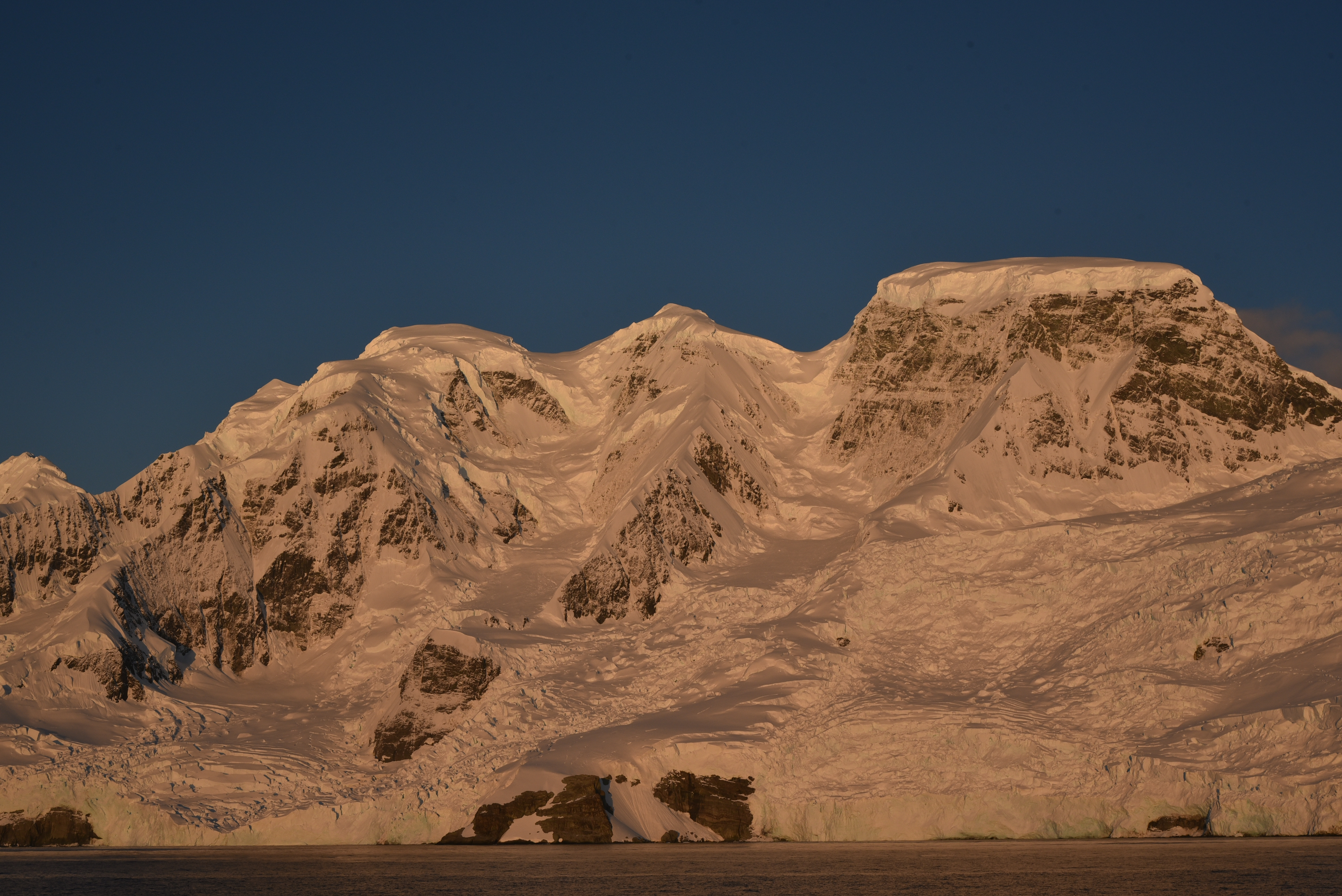
- Left to right Rupite, Pashuk and Krivodol Glaciers of Smith Island

- Location within South Shetland Islands Location within Antarctica
- Location: Smith Island; South Shetland Islands
- Coordinates: 63°00′05″S 62°31′00″W
- Length: 2.9 kilometres (1.8 mi)
- Thickness: unknown
- Terminus: Osmar Strait
- Status: unknown

Topographic map of Smith Island.

Rupite Glacier (Bulgarian: ледник Рупите, romanized: lednik Rupite, IPA: [ˈlɛdnik ˈrupitɛ]; 63°00′05″S 62°31′00″W) is a 2.9 kilometres (1.8 mi) long glacier on Smith Island, South Shetland Islands draining the southeast slopes of Imeon Range east of the summit Mount Foster and southeast of Evlogi Peak. It is situated southeast of Chuprene Glacier, southwest of Pashuk Glacier and northeast of Landreth Glacier, and flows southeastward into Osmar Strait. Bulgarian early mapping in 2008. The glacier is named after the settlement Rupite and the nearby protected area in southwestern Bulgaria.

== See also ==
- List of glaciers in the Antarctic
- Glaciology

== Maps ==
- Chart of South Shetland including Coronation Island, &c. from the exploration of the sloop Dove in the years 1821 and 1822 by George Powell Commander of the same. Scale ca. 1:200000. London: Laurie, 1822.
- L.L. Ivanov. Antarctica: Livingston Island and Greenwich, Robert, Snow and Smith Islands. Scale 1:120000 topographic map. Troyan: Manfred Wörner Foundation, 2010. ISBN 978-954-92032-9-5 (First edition 2009. ISBN 978-954-92032-6-4)
- South Shetland Islands: Smith and Low Islands. Scale 1:150000 topographic map No. 13677. British Antarctic Survey, 2009.
- Antarctic Digital Database (ADD). Scale 1:250000 topographic map of Antarctica. Scientific Committee on Antarctic Research (SCAR). Since 1993, regularly upgraded and updated.
- L.L. Ivanov. Antarctica: Livingston Island and Smith Island. Scale 1:100000 topographic map. Manfred Wörner Foundation, 2017. ISBN 978-619-90008-3-0
