= Varshets =

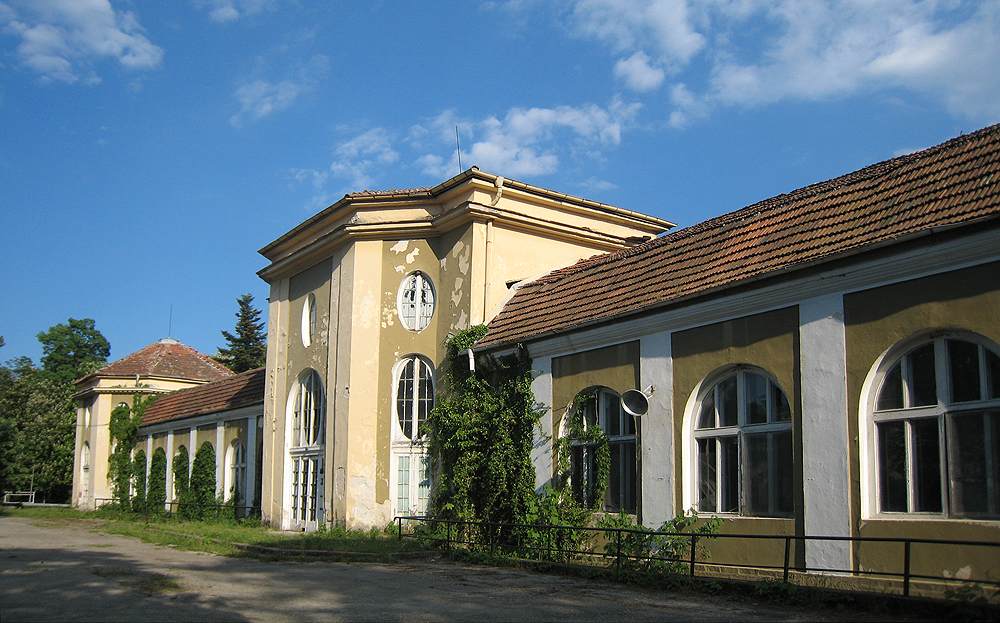
- The former Royal Spa Casino.

- Location of Varshets
- Coordinates: 43°10′58.8″N 23°16′58.8″E
- Country: Bulgaria
- Provinces (Oblast): Montana
- Elevation: 395 m (1,296 ft)

Population (31.12.2019)
  - Total: 5,444
- Time zone: UTC+2 (EET)
  - Summer (DST): UTC+3 (EEST)
- Postal Code: 3540
- Area code: 09527

Varshets (Bulgarian: Вършец, variously transliterated; pronounced [vɐrˈʃɛt͡s]) is a spa town in Montana Province, northwestern Bulgaria. It is the administrative centre of the homonymous Varshets Municipality. As of December 2019, its population was 5,444. The town is located on the northern slopes of the western part of the Balkan Mountains in the small valley of the Botunya River, at 43°12′N 23°17′E, 359 metres above sea level. It is one of the oldest resorts in northern Bulgaria, and is known for its mineral springs, mild mountain climate, and natural environment. The town's tourist infrastructure includes two spa centres, a polyclinic, several rest houses, hotels and also many private lodgings. Varshets has an art gallery, a municipal museum and an Eastern Orthodox church dedicated to Saint George.

A 2nd century BC bronze sculpture of a Thracian boy found in the vicinity of the town is today a symbol of Varshets. The modern town is linked to Medeca, a Roman and Byzantine site first mentioned in the 6th century AD. Varshets' existence was also evidenced in 16th century documents. The first state baths in Varshets were built in 1910 and were run by Damyan Ivanov, a balneologist who specialized in Austria-Hungary. The New Baths were built in 1930, and the Sun Garden was arranged in 1934. In 1950, Varshets was proclaimed a national resort.

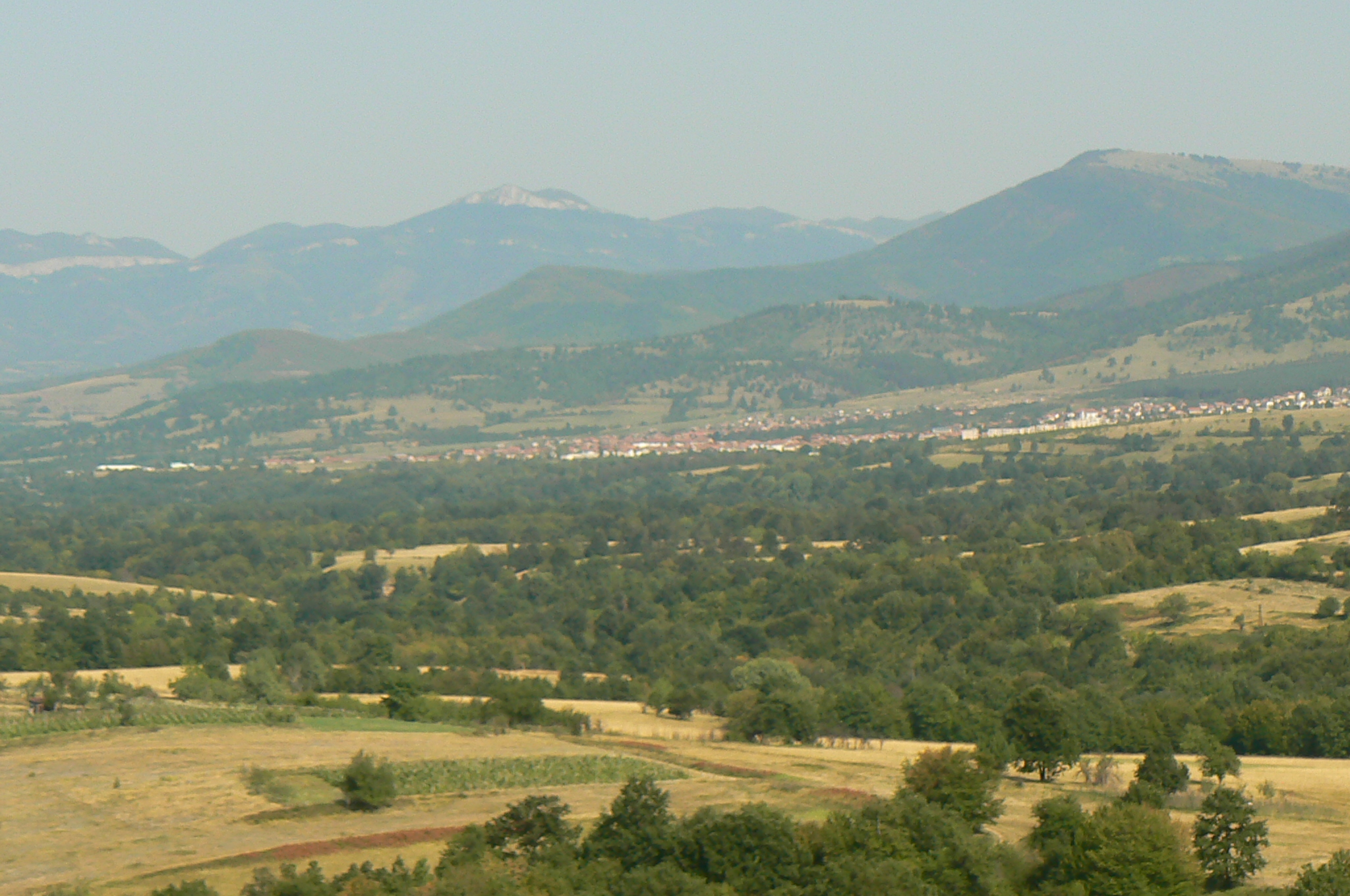
The city's surroundings

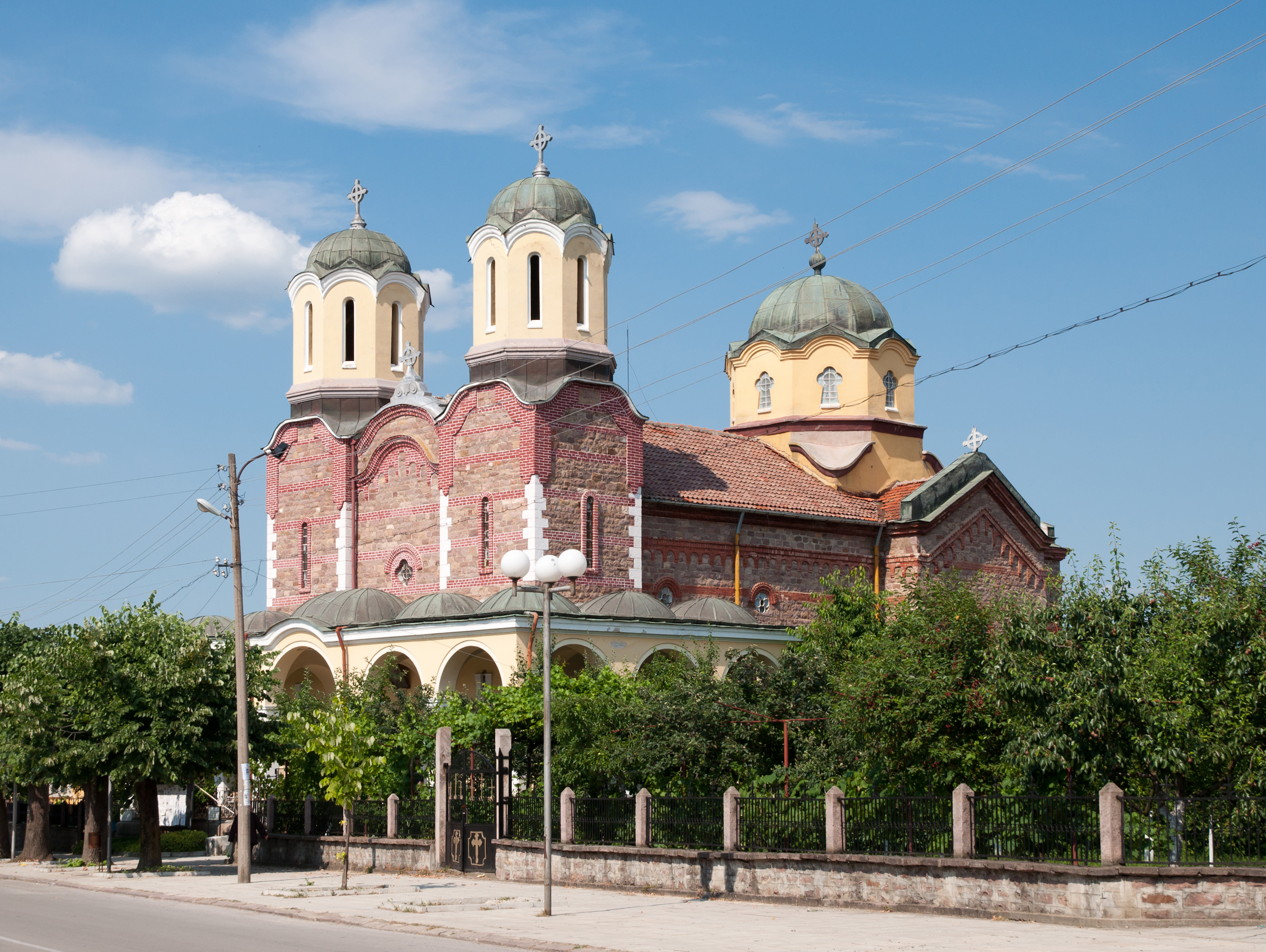
St. George Church

== Places named after Varshets ==
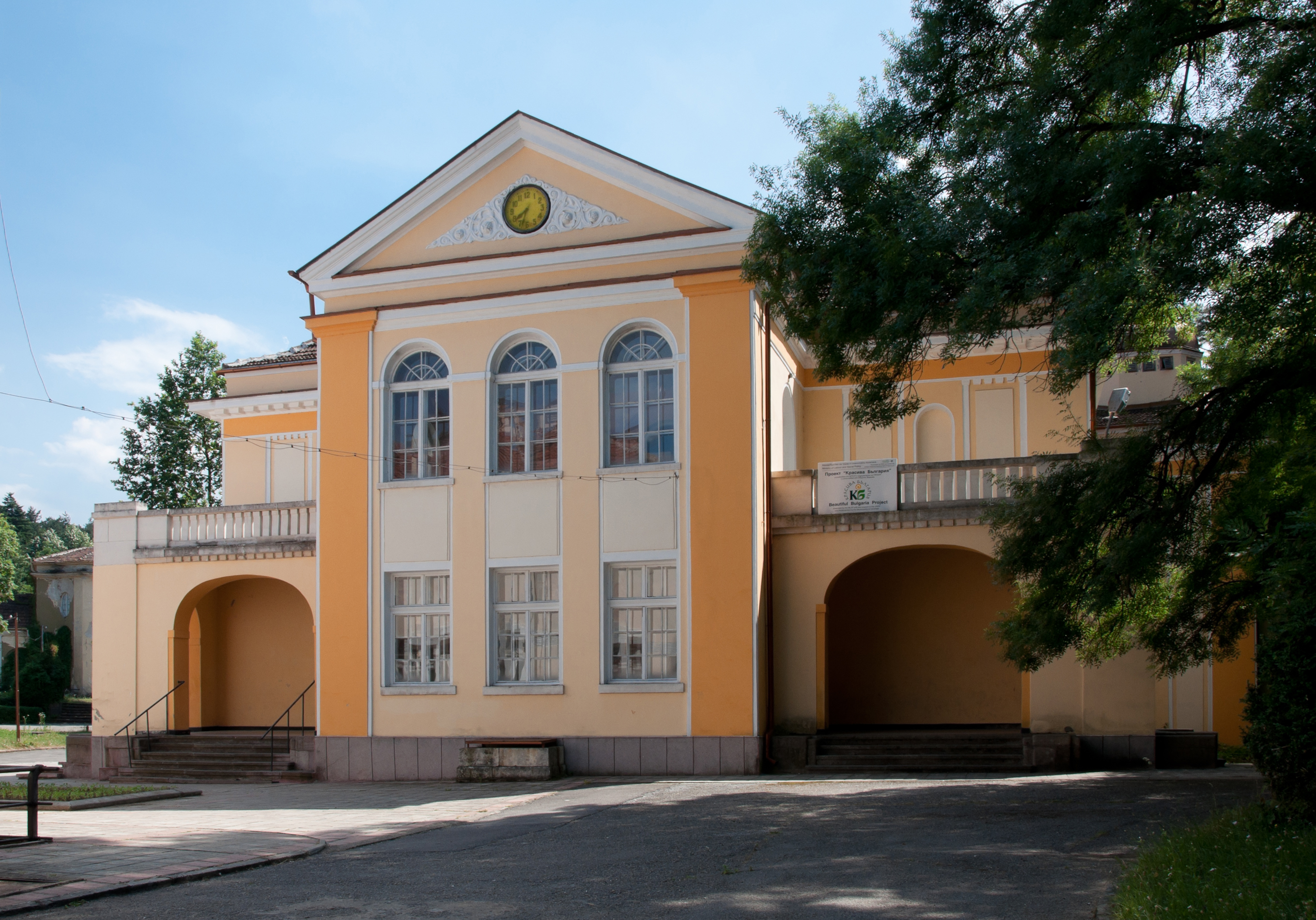
Varshets, the renovated Spa center

Varshets Saddle on Smith Island, South Shetland Islands is named after Varshets.

"Varshets" is also the name of the paleontological locality of Middle Villafranchian (Late Pliocene) fauna and flora near the village of Dolno Ozirovo close to the town of Varshets.

== Notable people ==
- Lachezar Stanchev, a poet born in Villa Nezabravka.
