= Evlogi Georgiev =

Evlogi Georgiev (Bulgarian: Евлоги Георгиев) (3 October 1819 – 5 July 1897) was a major Bulgarian merchant, banker and benefactor. The main building of the Sofia University was built with a large financial donation by him and his brother Hristo Georgiev.

== Biography ==
Georgiev was born in Karlovo, but spent most of his life in Bucharest, where he operated a successful business.

== Honour ==
Evlogi Peak on Smith Island, South Shetland Islands is named after Evlogi Georgiev.
