= Garmen Point =

Point in the South Shetland Islands, Antarctica

Coordinates: 62°59′12″S 62°35′56″W

Location of Smith Island in the South Shetland Islands.

Topographic map of Smith Island.

Garmen Point (Bulgarian: нос Гърмен, ‘Nos Garmen’ \'nos 'g&r-men\) is a point on the northwest coast of Smith Island, South Shetland Islands situated 13.65 kilometres (7.4 nmi) north-northeast of Cape James, 6.12 km (3.3 nmi) south-southwest of Markeli Point and 19.65 km (10.6 nmi) southwest of Cape Smith. Formed by an offshoot of Mount Foster. The point is named after the settlement of Garmen in southwestern Bulgaria.

== Maps ==
- Chart of South Shetland including Coronation Island, &c. from the exploration of the sloop Dove in the years 1821 and 1822 by George Powell Commander of the same. Scale ca. 1:200000. London: Laurie, 1822.
- L.L. Ivanov. Antarctica: Livingston Island and Greenwich, Robert, Snow and Smith Islands. Scale 1:120000 topographic map. Troyan: Manfred Wörner Foundation, 2010. ISBN 978-954-92032-9-5 (First edition 2009. ISBN 978-954-92032-6-4)
- South Shetland Islands: Smith and Low Islands. Scale 1:150000 topographic map No. 13677. British Antarctic Survey, 2009.
- Antarctic Digital Database (ADD). Scale 1:250000 topographic map of Antarctica. Scientific Committee on Antarctic Research (SCAR). Since 1993, regularly upgraded and updated.
- L.L. Ivanov. Antarctica: Livingston Island and Smith Island. Scale 1:100000 topographic map. Manfred Wörner Foundation, 2017. ISBN 978-619-90008-3-0
