= Hristo Georgiev (patron) =

Bulgarian banker

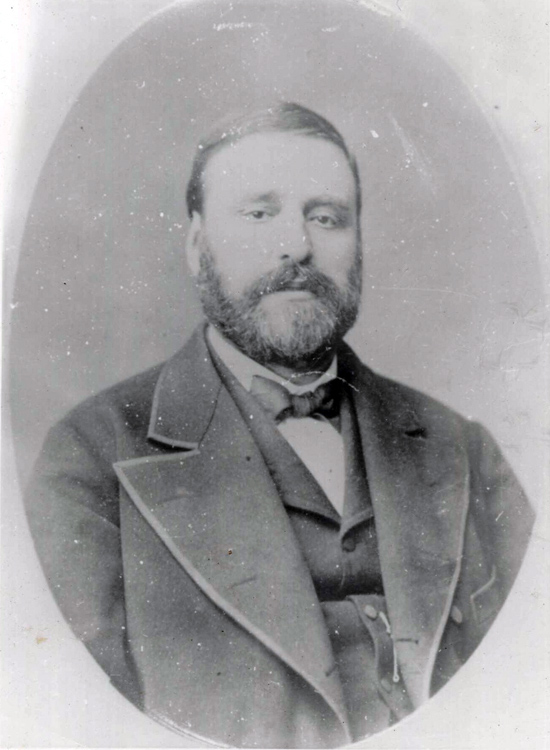
Portrait of Hristo Georgiev

Hristo Georgiev (Bulgarian: Христо Георгиев) was a wealthy Bulgarian entrepreneur, and younger brother of Evlogi Georgiev, who lived in the 19th century. Born in 1824 in Karlovo, he and his brother emigrated to Romania, where he was the head of a trading company. There, in May 1854, he would meet Nayden Gerov, who would become a close friend of his. With his brother he funded the construction of Sofia University in Bulgaria's capital. The university was one of the most important and modern institutions of the time, with tens of thousands of native and foreign students. He died suddenly on 6 March 1872.
