= Markeli Point =

Coordinates: 62°56′10″S 62°33′05″W

Location of Smith Island in the South Shetland Islands.

Topographic map of Smith Island.

Markeli Point (Bulgarian: нос Маркели, ‘Nos Markeli’ \'nos mar-'ke-li\) is a point on the northwest coast of Smith Island in the South Shetland Islands, Antarctica, projecting 1.2 km west-southwestwards into Drake Passage. Situated on the north side of the entrance to Cabut Cove 14.5 km southwest of Cape Smith, 2 km south-southwest of Gregory Point and 19.8 km north-northeast of Cape James. Bulgarian early mapping in 2009. Named after the medieval fortress of Markeli in southeastern Bulgaria.
