= Antim Peak =

Mountain on Smith Island, South Shetland Islands, Antarctica

Location of Smith Island in the South Shetland Islands

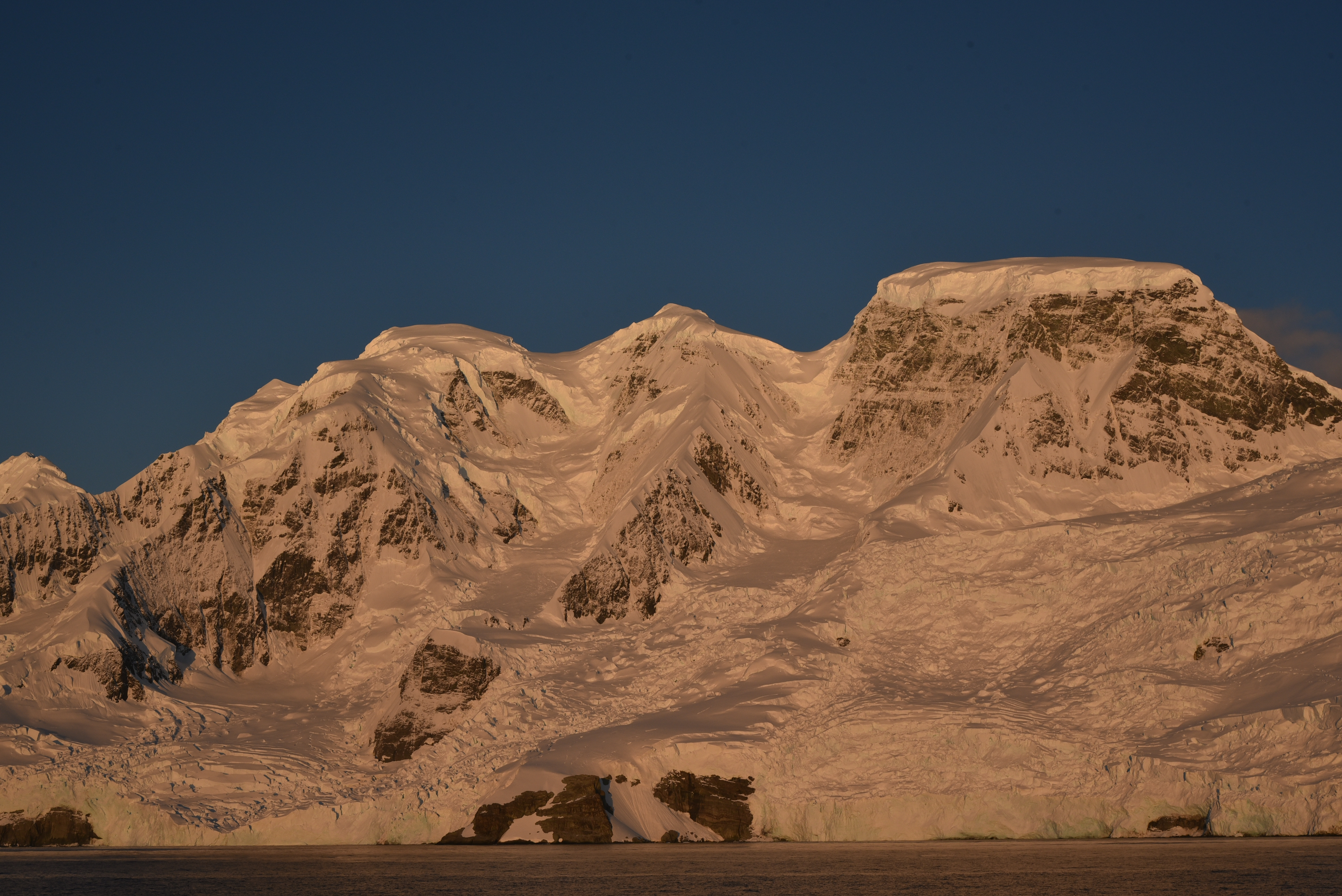
Antim Peak with the twin Mount Foster and Evlogi Peak on the left

Antim Peak (Bulgarian: връх Антим, romanized: vrah Antim, IPA: [ˈvrɤx ɐnˈtim]; 62°58′53″S 62°31′10″W) is the ice-covered peak rising to 1,995 m in Imeon Range on Smith Island in the South Shetland Islands, Antarctica. Situated 2.25 km and 1.3 km northeast of the summit Mount Foster and Evlogi Peak, respectively, 5.4 km south-southwest of Mount Pisgah, 16 km southwest of Cape Smith, and 16 km northeast of Cape James. The peak surmounts Chuprene Glacier to the west and northwest, Krivodol Glacier to the northeast and east, and Pashuk Glacier to the southeast. It has been confirmed to be a separate peak rather than part of Mount Foster by the team of Greg Landreth that made the first ascent of the latter in 1996.

Antim Peak was first ascended by the French mountaineers Mathieu Cortial, Lionel Daudet and Patrick Wagnon on 12 January 2010. Their route called Le vol du sérac (Flight of the Serac) followed the western spur of the peak.

The peak is named after Exarch Antim I (1816–1888), the first head of the Bulgarian Exarchate reestablishing the autocephaly of the Bulgarian Church in 1870.

== See also ==
- Imeon Range
- List of Bulgarian toponyms in Antarctica

== Maps ==
Topographic map of Smith Island.

- Chart of South Shetland including Coronation Island, &c. from the exploration of the sloop Dove in the years 1821 and 1822 by George Powell Commander of the same. Scale ca. 1:200000. London: Laurie, 1822.
- L.L. Ivanov. Antarctica: Livingston Island and Greenwich, Robert, Snow and Smith Islands. Scale 1:120000 topographic map. Troyan: Manfred Wörner Foundation, 2010. ISBN 978-954-92032-9-5 (First edition 2009. ISBN 978-954-92032-6-4)
- South Shetland Islands: Smith and Low Islands. Scale 1:150000 topographic map No. 13677. British Antarctic Survey, 2009.
- Antarctic Digital Database (ADD). Scale 1:250000 topographic map of Antarctica. Scientific Committee on Antarctic Research (SCAR). Since 1993, regularly upgraded and updated.
- L.L. Ivanov. Antarctica: Livingston Island and Smith Island. Scale 1:100000 topographic map. Manfred Wörner Foundation, 2017. ISBN 978-619-90008-3-0
