= Mount Foster =

Mountain in Smith Island, South Shetland Islands, Antarctica

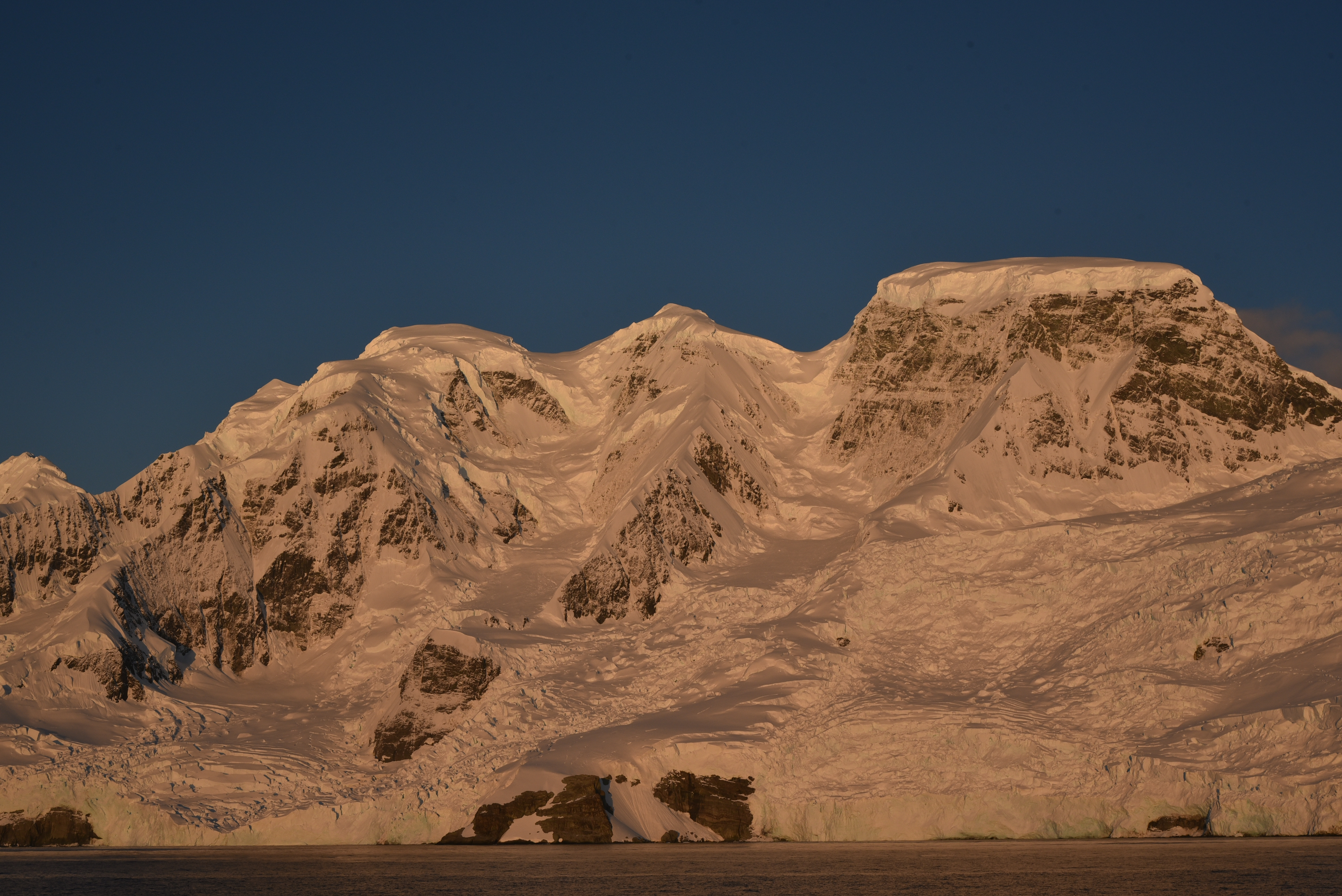
- Left to right Mount Foster, Evlogi Peak and Antim Peak

Highest point
- Elevation: 2,025 m (6,644 ft)
- Prominence: 2,025 m (6,644 ft)
- Listing: Ultra, Ribu
- Coordinates: 62°59′42″S 62°33′06.3″W

Geography
- Location within Antarctica
- Location: Smith Island, Antarctica
- Range coordinates: 62°58′30″S 62°30′20″W
- Parent range: Imeon Range

Climbing
- First ascent: Greg Landreth, Brice Dowrick, Dan Mannix and Roger Thompson, 1996

Mount Foster is a peak rising to 2,025 metres (6,644 ft) in the Imeon Range on Smith Island in the South Shetland Islands. It is the highest point of the South Shetland Islands archipelago. Mount Foster has triple peaks of which Mount Foster proper is the southernmost, the central one is Evlogi Peak (2,024 m), and the northern one is Antim Peak (1,995 m). The first ascent was made by Greg Landreth and his team comprising Brice Dowrick, Dan Mannix and Roger Thompson on 30 January 1996.

The feature is named after Captain Henry Foster, commander of HMS Chanticleer who explored the South Shetlands in 1829.

== Elevation ==
Traditionally, the elevation of Mount Foster was put at 2,105 metres (6,906 ft). However, according to the American high accuracy Reference Elevation Model of Antarctica (REMA) edition 2022, the actual elevation (at 2-meter spatial resolution) is 2,025 m, just 1 m higher than the adjacent Evlogi Peak.

== Location ==
Location of Smith Island in the South Shetland Islands

Mount Foster is linked by Zavet Saddle (elevation 1,350 m) to Slaveykov Peak to the southwest and by a saddle of elevation 1,899 m to Evlogi Peak to the north-northeast. It surmounts Bistra Glacier to the west, Chuprene Glacier to the north-northwest, Rupite Glacier to the east, Landreth Glacier to the southeast and Dragoman Glacier to the south-southeast. The peak is located 5.45 km northeast of Riggs Peak, 2.78 km south-southeast of Garmen Point, 7.64 km southwest of Mount Pisgah and 3.86 km north-northwest of Ivan Asen Point (Bulgarian mapping in 2009).

== Maps ==
- Chart of South Shetland including Coronation Island, &c. from the exploration of the sloop Dove in the years 1821 and 1822 by George Powell Commander of the same. Scale ca. 1:200000. London: Laurie, 1822
- L.L. Ivanov. Antarctica: Livingston Island and Greenwich, Robert, Snow and Smith Islands. Scale 1:120000 topographic map. Troyan: Manfred Wörner Foundation, 2010. ISBN 978-954-92032-9-5 (First edition 2009. ISBN 978-954-92032-6-4)
- South Shetland Islands: Smith and Low Islands. Scale 1:150000 topographic map No. 13677. British Antarctic Survey, 2009
- Antarctic Digital Database (ADD). Scale 1:250000 topographic map of Antarctica. Scientific Committee on Antarctic Research (SCAR). Since 1993, regularly upgraded and updated
- L.L. Ivanov. Antarctica: Livingston Island and Smith Island. Scale 1:100000 topographic map. Manfred Wörner Foundation, 2017. ISBN 978-619-90008-3-0

== See also ==
- List of ultras of Antarctica
- Imeon Range
- Smith Island
