= Cape James =

Cape in the South Shetland Islands, Antarctica

Location of Smith Island in the South Shetland Islands

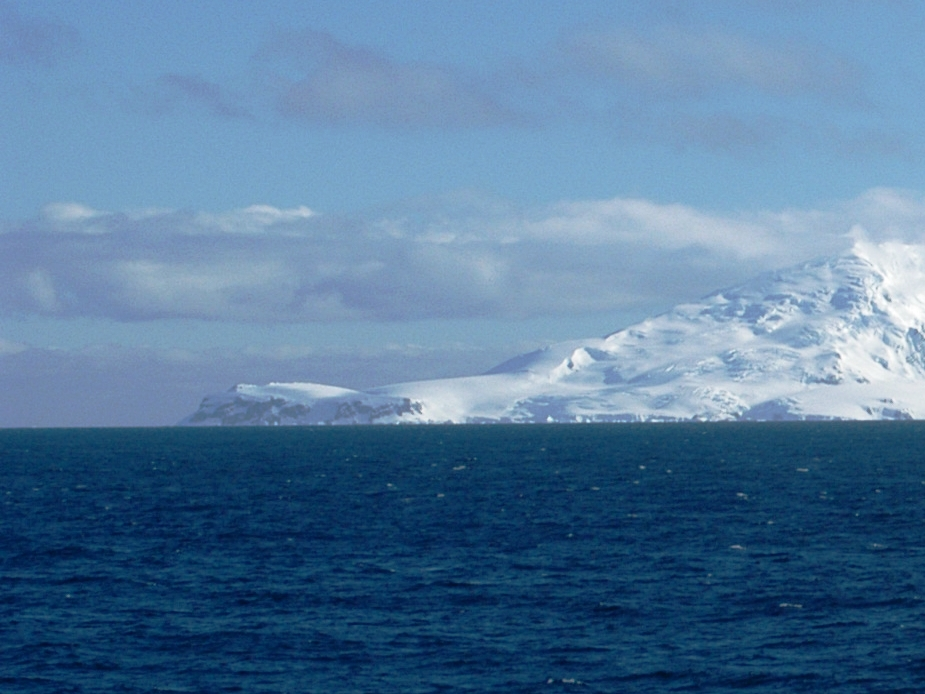
Cape James from Osmar Strait

Topographic map of Smith Island

Cape James is a cape which forms the southern tip of Smith Island in the South Shetland Islands, Antarctica. The name appears on a chart based upon the 1828–1831 British naval expedition under Captain Henry Foster, and is now well established in international usage.

== Location ==
The point is located at 63°05′50″S 62°43′01″W which is 4.5 kilometres (2.8 mi) south-southwest of Elin Pelin Point, 6.8 kilometres (4.2 mi) southwest of Organa Peak, 3.55 kilometres (2.2 mi) west-southwest of Suhindol Point and 29.5 kilometres (18.3 mi) northwest of Low Island (Bulgarian mapping in 2009).

== Maps ==
- Chart of South Shetland including Coronation Island, &c. from the exploration of the sloop Dove in the years 1821 and 1822 by George Powell Commander of the same. Scale ca. 1:200000. London: Laurie, 1822.
- L.L. Ivanov. Antarctica: Livingston Island and Greenwich, Robert, Snow and Smith Islands. Scale 1:120000 topographic map. Troyan: Manfred Wörner Foundation, 2010. ISBN 978-954-92032-9-5 (First edition 2009. ISBN 978-954-92032-6-4)
- South Shetland Islands: Smith and Low Islands. Scale 1:150000 topographic map No. 13677. British Antarctic Survey, 2009.
- Antarctic Digital Database (ADD). Scale 1:250000 topographic map of Antarctica. Scientific Committee on Antarctic Research (SCAR). Since 1993, regularly upgraded and updated.
- L.L. Ivanov. Antarctica: Livingston Island and Smith Island. Scale 1:100000 topographic map. Manfred Wörner Foundation, 2017. ISBN 978-619-90008-3-0
