= Imeon Range =

Mountain range in Antarctica

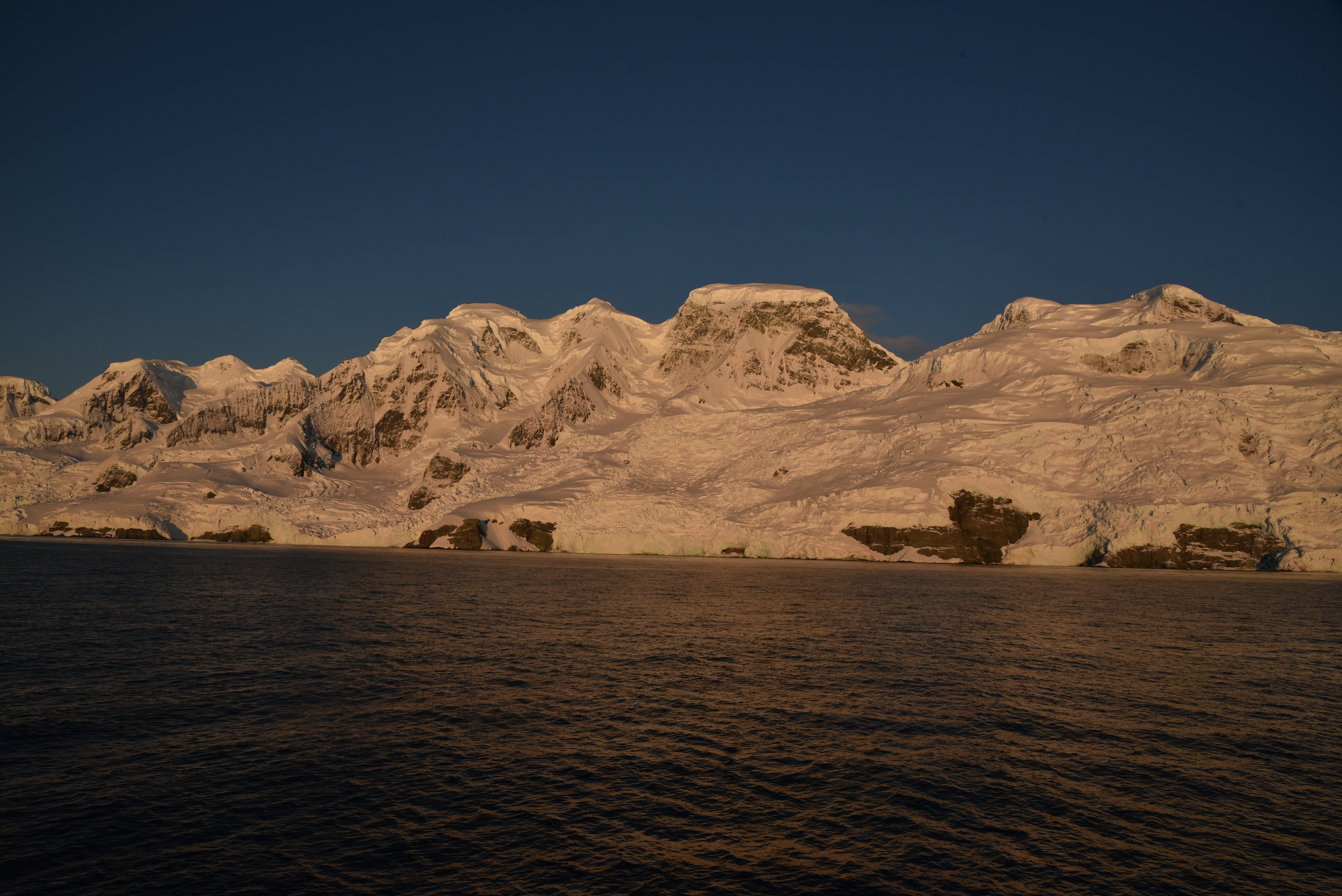
- Central Imeon Range with its summits Mount Foster, Evlogi Peak and Antim Peak in the middle

Highest point
- Peak: Mount Foster
- Elevation: 2,025 m (6,644 ft)

Dimensions
- Length: 30 km (19 mi)
- Width: 6.8 km (4.2 mi)

Geography
- Location of Smith Island in the South Shetland Islands
- Continent: Antarctica
- Region: South Shetland Islands
- Range coordinates: 62°58′30″S 62°30′20″W

Topographic map of Smith Island

Large scale map of Cape Smith area on Smith Island in the South Shetland Islands

Imeon Range (Bulgarian: Хребет Имеон, ‘Hrebet Imeon’ \'hre-bet i-me-'on\) (62°58′30″S 62°30′20″W) is a mountain range occupying the interior of Smith Island in the South Shetland Islands, Antarctica. It extends 30 km (19 mi) in southwest-northeast direction between Cape James and Cape Smith, and is 6.8 km wide. Its summit Mount Foster (2,025 m) was first climbed in 1996 by a New Zealand team led by Greg Landreth. Other prominent peaks include Evlogi Peak (2,024 m), Antim Peak (1,995 m), Mount Pisgah (1,814 m), Slaveykov Peak (1,674 m), Tsarigrad Peak (1,689 m), Neofit Peak (1,657 m), Drinov Peak (1,519 m), Riggs Peak (1,601 m), Mount Christi (1,272 m) and Matochina Peak (784 m). It was first mapped by Bulgaria in 2009.

The range is named after Mount Imeon (present day Pamir, Hindu Kush, and Tian Shan), whose highlands and valleys around upper Oxus River (Amu Darya) were described as the ancient homeland of Bulgars by the seventh century Armenian geography index ‘Ashharatsuyts’ by Anania Shirakatsi.

== History ==
The first ascent of the summit Mount Foster was made by Greg Landreth and his team comprising Brice Dowrick, Dan Mannix and Roger Thompson on 30 January 1996. Antim Peak was first ascended by the French mountaineers Mathieu Cortial, Lionel Daudet and Patrick Wagnon on 12 January 2010. Their route called Le vol du sérac (Flight of the Serac) followed the western spur of the peak.

== See also ==
- Smith Island
- Bulgarian toponyms in Antarctica

== Maps ==
- Chart of South Shetland including Coronation Island, &c. from the exploration of the sloop Dove in the years 1821 and 1822 by George Powell Commander of the same. Scale ca. 1:200000. London: Laurie, 1822.
- L.L. Ivanov. Antarctica: Livingston Island and Greenwich, Robert, Snow and Smith Islands. Scale 1:120000 topographic map. Troyan: Manfred Wörner Foundation, 2010. ISBN 978-954-92032-9-5 (First edition 2009. ISBN 978-954-92032-6-4)
- South Shetland Islands: Smith and Low Islands. Scale 1:150000 topographic map No. 13677. British Antarctic Survey, 2009.
- Antarctic Digital Database (ADD). Scale 1:250000 topographic map of Antarctica. Scientific Committee on Antarctic Research (SCAR). Since 1993, regularly upgraded and updated.
- L.L. Ivanov. Antarctica: Livingston Island and Smith Island. Scale 1:100000 topographic map. Manfred Wörner Foundation, 2017. ISBN 978-619-90008-3-0
- A. Kamburov, L. Ivanov, N. Aleksandrova, V. Nikolova. Cape Smith, Smith Island, Antarctica. Scale 1:10000 topographic map. Manfred Wörner Foundation, 2026. ISBN 978-619-92883-2-0

== Notes ==
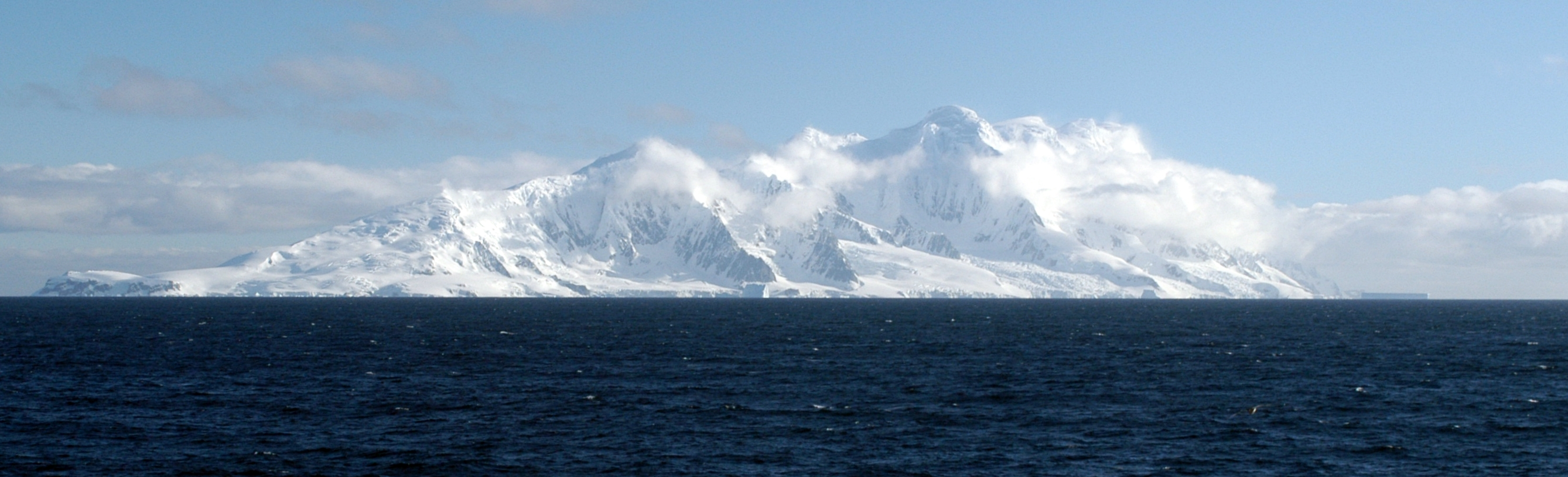
A southeast view of Smith Island from Osmar Strait, with Mount Foster, Evlogi Peak and Antim Peak on the right
