= Osmar Strait =

Waterway in Antarctica

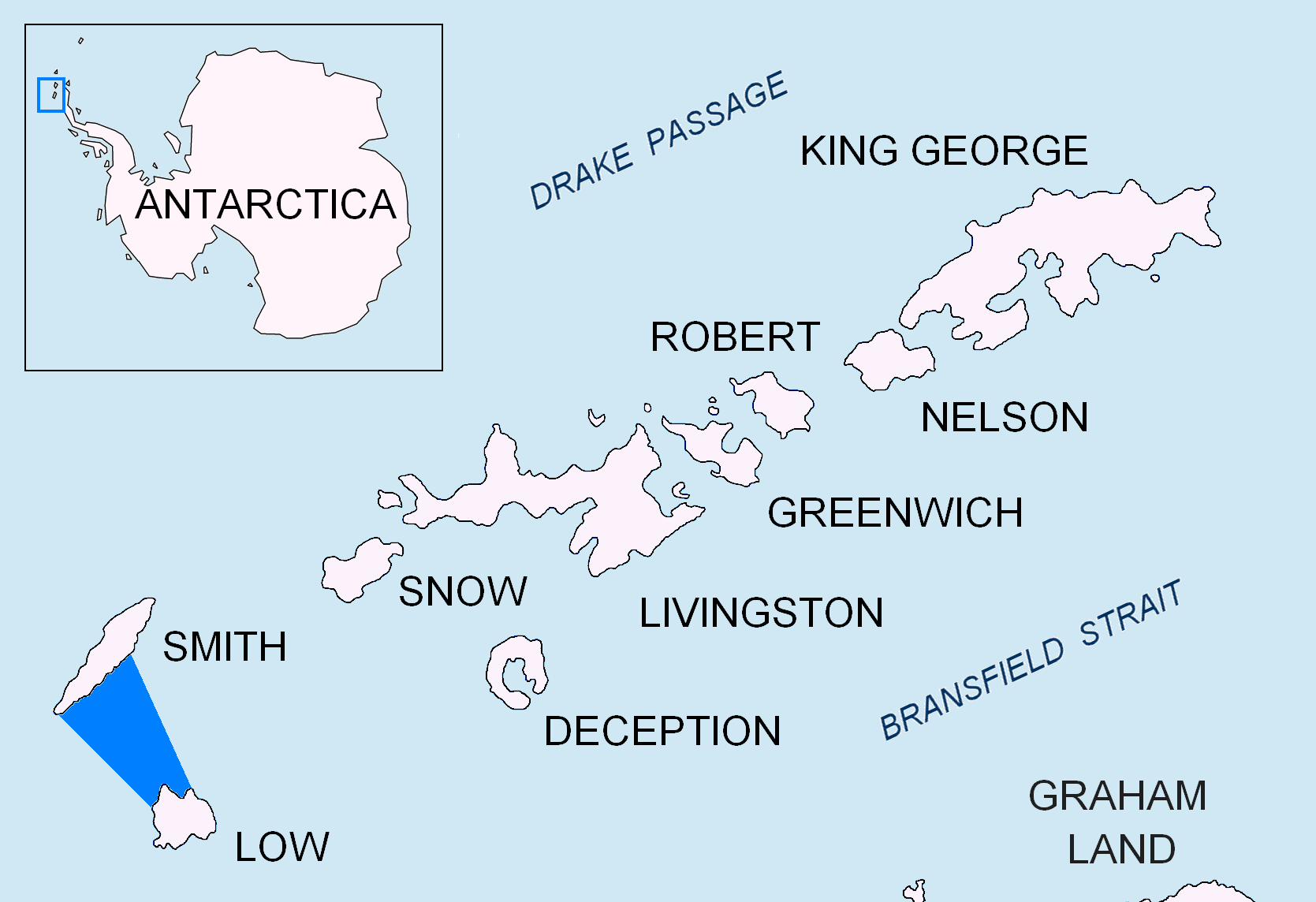
Location of Osmar Strait in the South Shetland Islands.

Topographic map of Livingston Island and Smith Island.

Osmar Strait (Bulgarian: проток Осмар, ‘Protok Osmar’ \'pro-tok os-'mar\) is the 14.6 nautical miles (27.0 km) wide strait in the South Shetland Islands, Antarctica between Smith Island to the northwest and Low Island to the southeast.

The strait is named after the settlement of Osmar in northeastern Bulgaria.

== Location ==
Osmar Strait is located at 63°09′00″S 62°24′00″W. British mapping in 2009, Bulgarian mapping of the Smith Island's coast of the strait in 2009 and 2017.

== Maps ==
- L.L. Ivanov. Antarctica: Livingston Island and Greenwich, Robert, Snow and Smith Islands. Scale 1:120000 topographic map. Troyan: Manfred Wörner Foundation, 2010. ISBN 978-954-92032-9-5 (First edition 2009. ISBN 978-954-92032-6-4)
- South Shetland Islands: Smith and Low Islands. Scale 1:150000 topographic map No. 13677. British Antarctic Survey, 2009.
- Antarctic Digital Database (ADD). Scale 1:250000 topographic map of Antarctica. Scientific Committee on Antarctic Research (SCAR). Since 1993, regularly upgraded and updated.
- L.L. Ivanov. Antarctica: Livingston Island and Smith Island. Scale 1:100000 topographic map. Manfred Wörner Foundation, 2017. ISBN 978-619-90008-3-0
