= Smith Island (South Shetland Islands) =

Island in Antarctica

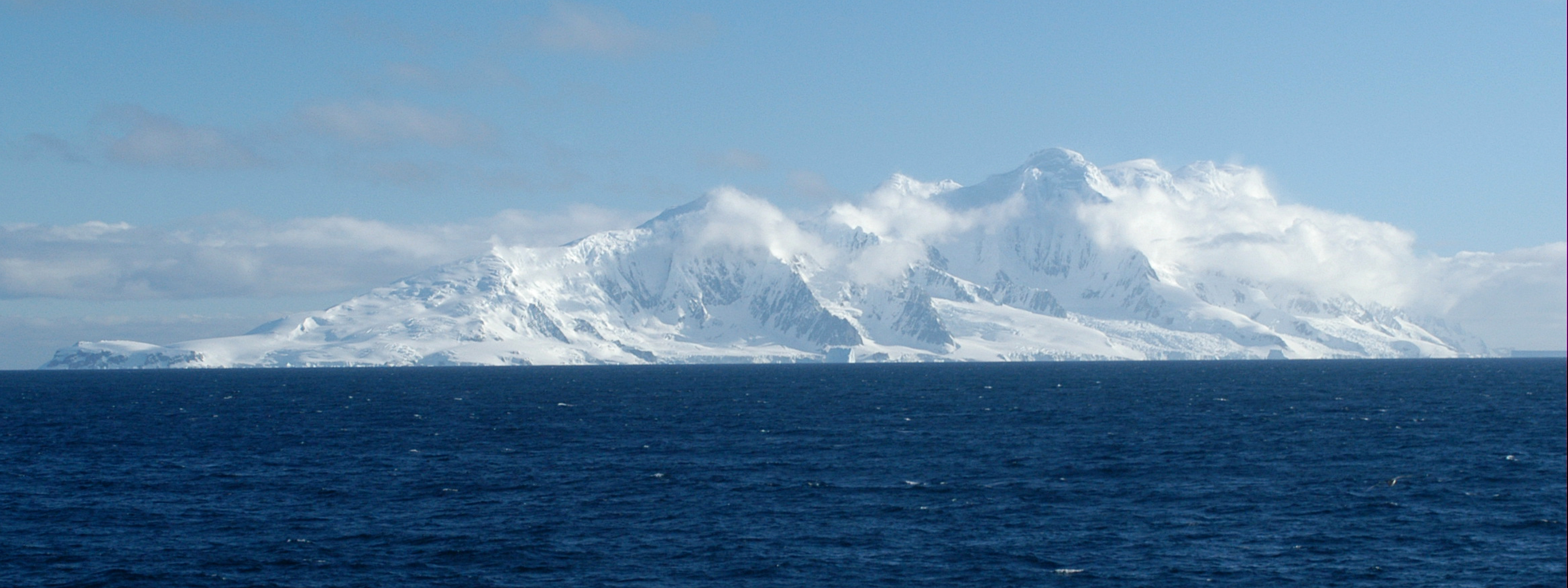
- Smith island with Imeon Range in the background

- Topographic map of Smith Island

- Location of in the South Shetland Islands Location in Antarctica

Geography
- Location: Antarctica
- Coordinates: 63°00′S 62°30′W
- Archipelago: South Shetland Islands
- Area: 148 km^{2} (57 sq mi)
- Length: 20 mi (30 km)
- Width: 5 mi (8 km)
- Highest elevation: 2,025 m (6644 ft)
- Highest point: Mount Foster

Administration
- Administered under the Antarctic Treaty System

Demographics
- Population: 0

Smith Island is 20 miles (32 km) long and 5 miles (8 kilometres) wide, lying 49 miles (79 km) west of Deception Island in the South Shetland Islands of the British Antarctic Territory. It is separated from Snow Island by the 25-mile-wide (40 km) Boyd Strait, and from Low Island by the 17-mile-wide (27 km) Osmar Strait. Surface area is 148 square kilometres (57 sq mi).

The discovery of the South Shetland Islands was first reported in 1819 by Capt. William Smith, after whom the island is named. This island was known to both American and British sealers as early as 1820, and the name Smith has been well established in international usage for over 100 years, although in Russian literature it is often referred to as Borodino Island, sometimes marked as Borodino (Smith) Island.

The island hosts no research stations or camps, and is seldom visited by scientists or mountaineers. Its interior is entirely occupied by the Imeon Range, rising to 2,025 m (6,644 ft) (Mount Foster). The first detailed topographic mapping of the island was made by the Antarctic Place-names Commission and the Military Geographic Service of the Bulgarian Army and published in 2009 in both English and Bulgarian.

== Maps ==
- Chart of South Shetland including Coronation Island, &c. from the exploration of the sloop Dove in the years 1821 and 1822 by George Powell Commander of the same. Scale ca. 1:200000. London: Laurie, 1822.
- L.L. Ivanov. Antarctica: Livingston Island and Greenwich, Robert, Snow and Smith Islands. Scale 1:120000 topographic map. Troyan: Manfred Wörner Foundation, 2010. ISBN 978-954-92032-9-5 (First edition 2009. ISBN 978-954-92032-6-4)
- South Shetland Islands: Smith and Low Islands. Scale 1:150000 topographic map No. 13677. British Antarctic Survey, 2009.
- Antarctic Digital Database (ADD). Scale 1:250000 topographic map of Antarctica. Scientific Committee on Antarctic Research (SCAR). Since 1993, regularly upgraded and updated.
- L.L. Ivanov. Antarctica: Livingston Island and Smith Island. Scale 1:100000 topographic map. Manfred Wörner Foundation, 2017. ISBN 978-619-90008-3-0

== See also ==
- Composite Antarctic Gazetteer
- Imeon Range
- List of Antarctic islands south of 60° S
- SCAR
- South Shetland Islands
- Territorial claims in Antarctica
