= Dzhebel =

Town in Kardzhali Province, Bulgaria

Dzhebel Джебел
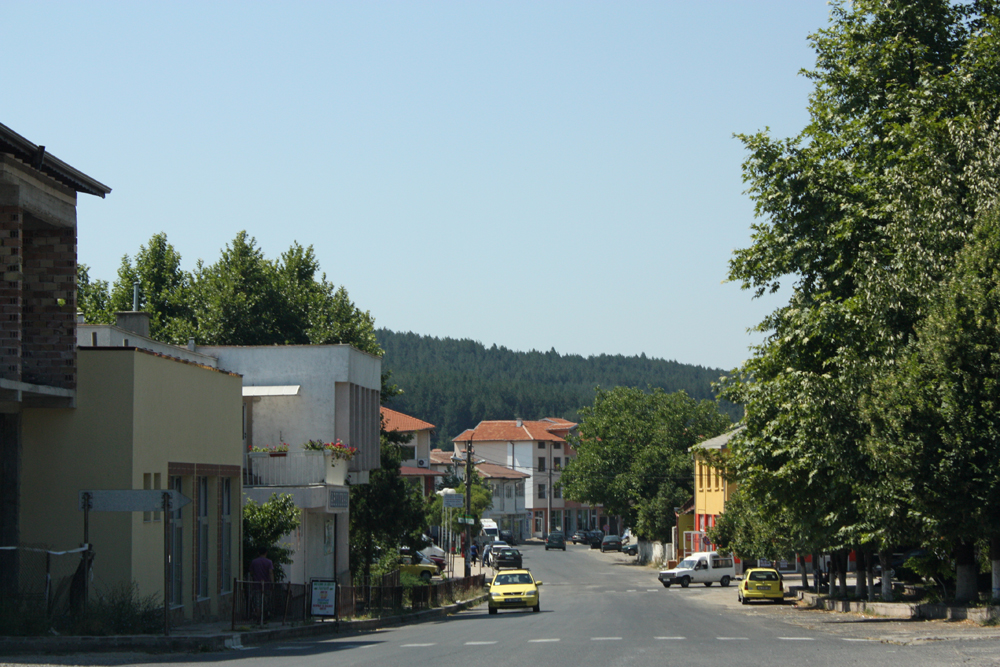
- Central district of Dzhebel

- Coat of arms

- Location within Bulgaria
- Coordinates: 41°30′N 25°18′E
- Country: Bulgaria

Dzhebel or Djebel (Bulgarian: Джебел [ˈd͡ʒɛbɛɫ], Turkish: Cebel, formerly: Şeyhcuma) is a town in Kardzhali Province, southern Bulgaria. It has 3,312 inhabitants. Dzhebel is the administrative center of a municipality, which apart from Dzhebel itself, contains 47 other villages and has a population of 9,093. The municipality is mainly populated by ethnic Turks, which are more than 75% of the total population. The word Dzhebel derives from the Arabic word "جبل" (jabal) which means "mountain".

== Settlements ==
- Dzhebel (seat)
- Albantsi
- Brejana
- Chakaltsi
- Chereshka
- General Geshevo
- Dobrintsi
- Dushinkovo
- Zheladovo
- Zhulti rid
- Zhultika
- Iliysko
- Kazatsite
- Kyoto
- Kamenyane
- Kozitsa
- Kontil
- Kuptsite
- Lebed
- Mishevsko
- Modren
- Mrezhichko
- Ovchevo
- Paprat
- Plazishte
- Podvrah
- Polyanets
- Potoche
- Pripek
- Ridino
- Rogozari
- Rogozche
- Rozhdensko
- Rut
- Shterna
- Sipets
- Skalina
- Slunchogled
- Sofiytsi
- Telcharka
- Tsurkvitsa
- Tsvyatovo
- Turnovtsi
- Tyutyunche
- Ustren
- Velikdenche
- Vodenicharsko
- Vulkovich
- Yamino
