= Ustra =

Medieval fortress in the eastern Rhodope Mountains in southern Bulgaria

- Bulgarian: Устра
- Kardzhali Province, Bulgaria
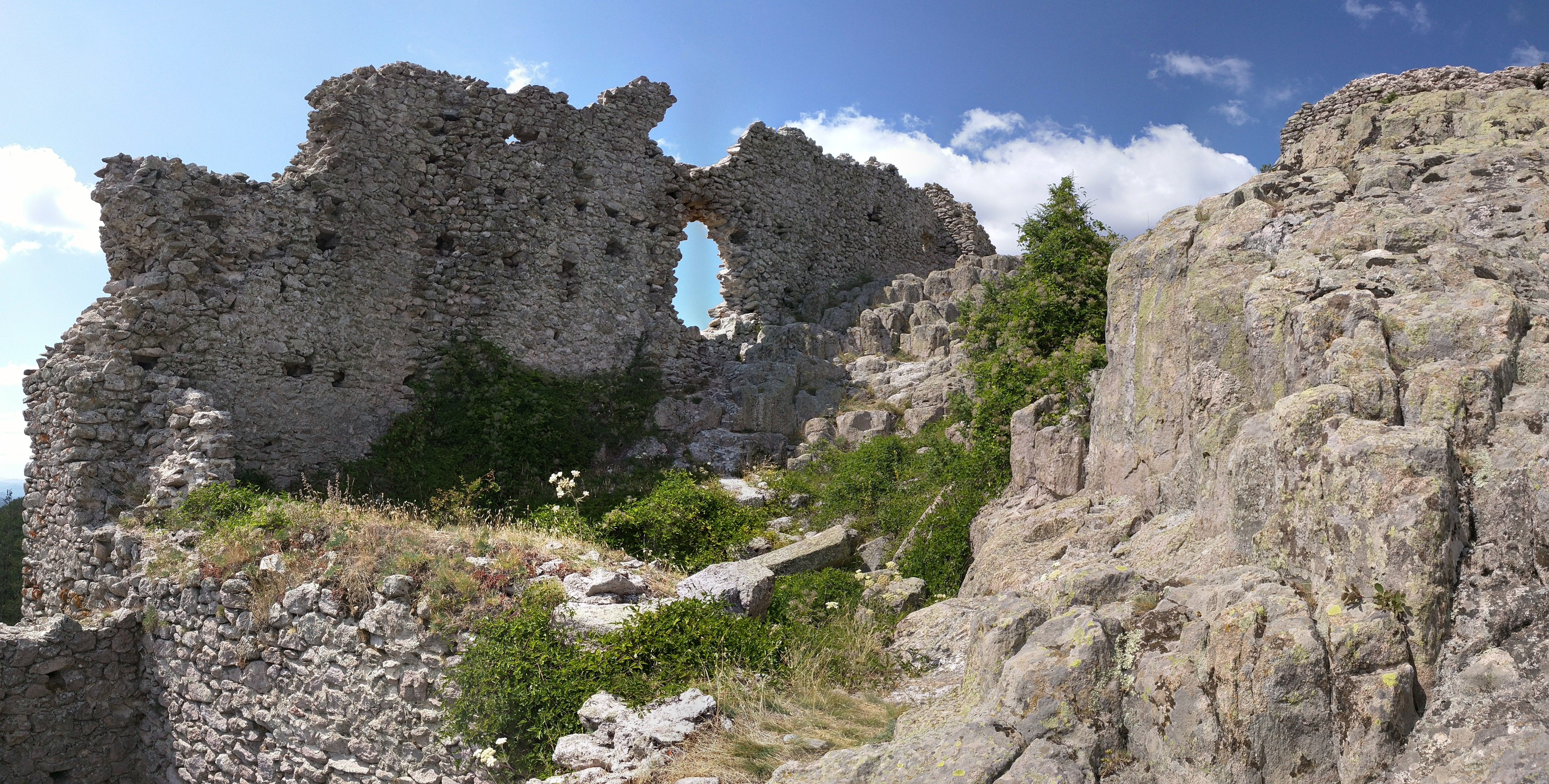
- The fortress walls from the outside

Site information
- Condition: in ruins

Location
- Coordinates: 41°28′13″N 25°13′33″E

Site history
- Events: Byzantine–Bulgarian Wars

Ustra (Bulgarian: Устра) is a medieval fortress in the eastern Rhodope Mountains in southern Bulgaria. It is among the highest and best preserved fortifications in the mountain range. The fortress was controlled by the Byzantine and the Bulgarian Empires until the region was conquered by the Ottoman Turks in the second half of the 14th century.

Ustra Peak on Livingston Island in the South Shetland Islands, Antarctica is named after the fortress.

== Location and status ==
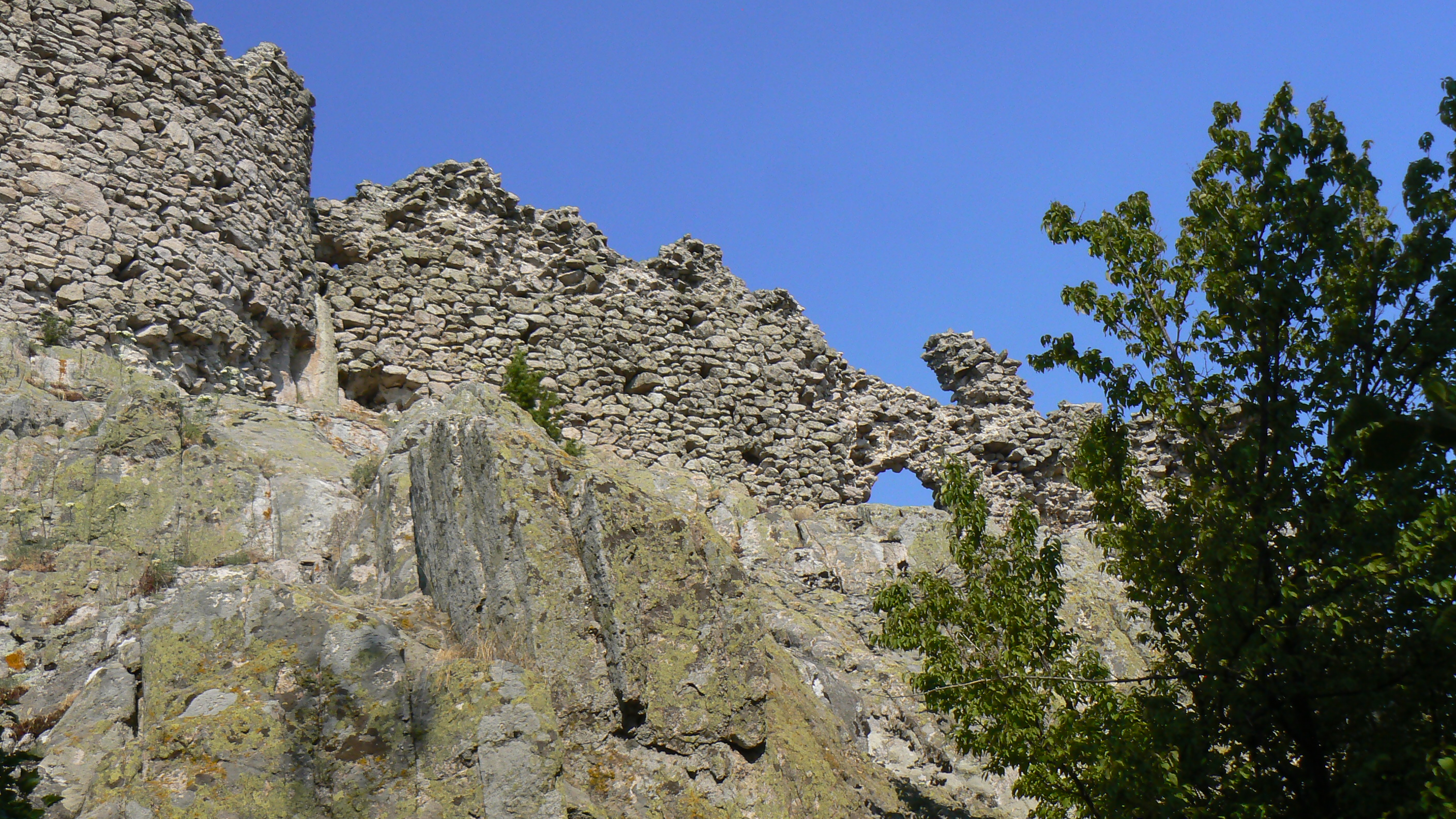
A view of Ustra

The ruins of the fortress are situated on a hill in Dzhebel Municipality of Kardzhali Province some 1.25 km north of the village of Ustren on a straight line and 2.5 km from the same settlement along the tourist path, and 3 km southwest of the village of Lebed. The distance from the municipal center Dzhebel is about 10 km in northeastern direction, while the provincial capital Kardzhali is 30 km away in the same direction. The main path for the fortress begins in the eastern outskirts of Ustren via the Ustra Refuge. An easier but lesser known track starts from the neighbouring village of Lebed.

Ustra is a monument of culture of national importance since 1968. It is also part of the Rock Formations in the Kaleto Locality Natural Landmark declared in 1972 to protect the rock formations and the fortress. In 2022 the ownership of the fortress was transferred from the Ministry of Culture to Dzhebel Municipality for a period of 10 years, in order to facilitate the municipal authorities to promote the site as a tourist landmark.

== Description ==
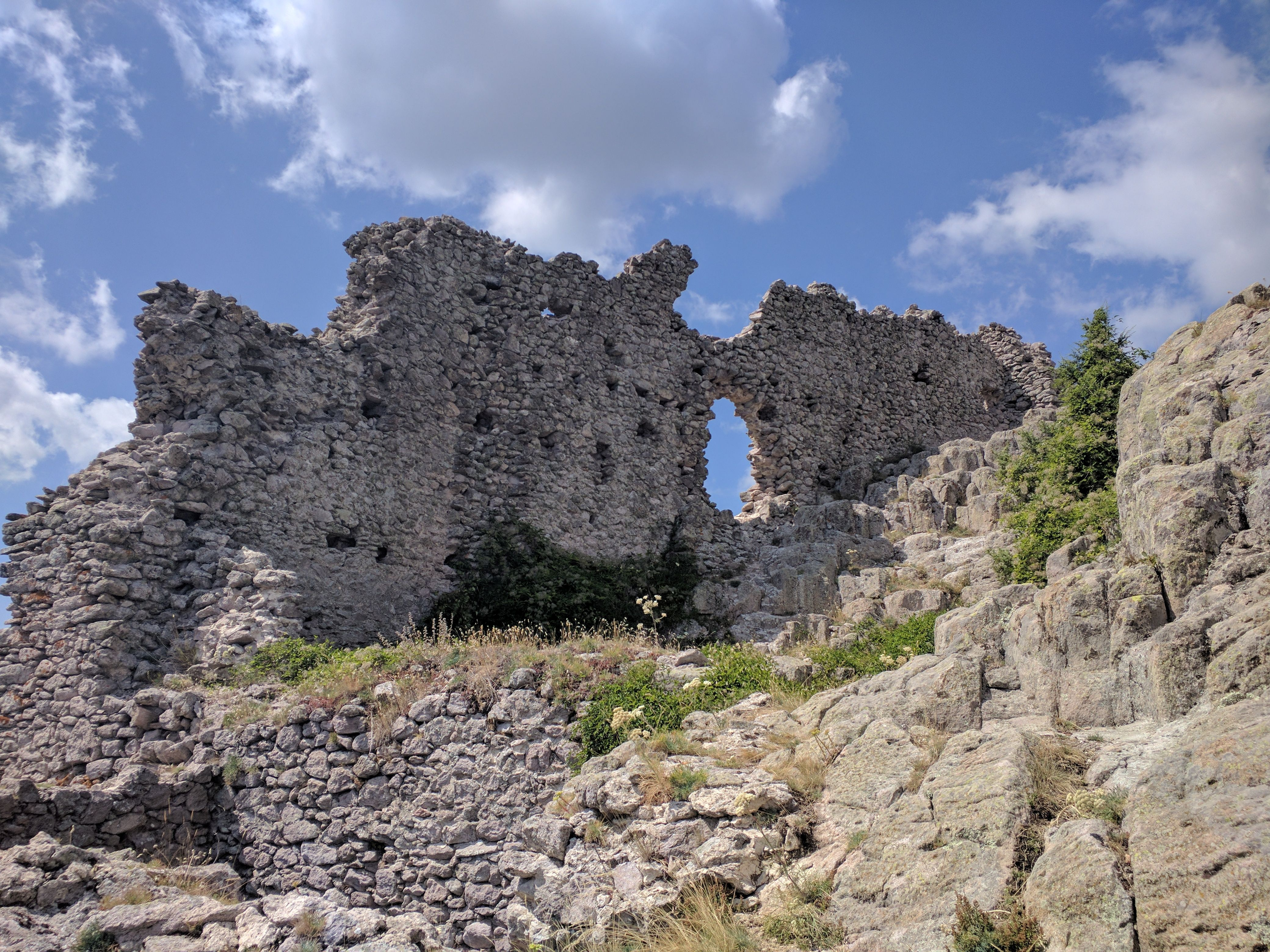
A view of Ustra

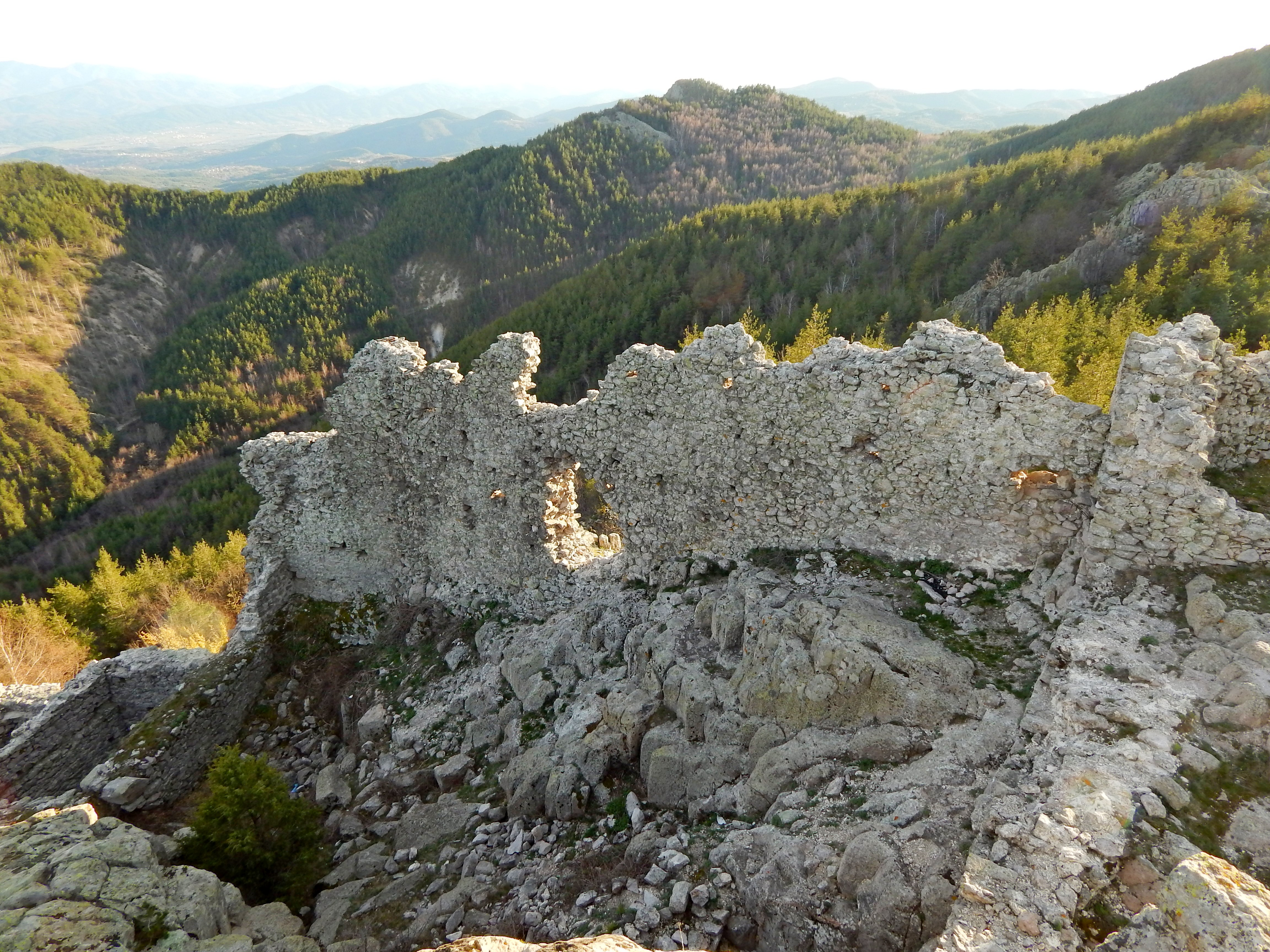
Autumn view

The fortress occupies an area of 1,290 m^{2} and has the shape of an open quadrangle resembling the Cyrillic letter "П". It rises on an elongated, rocky, steep peak with very good visibility, covering a long distance in the surrounding area. The sheer cliffs to the north and northwest descend almost vertically. Far to the northeast there is visibility to another important castle in the region, Monyak. Some 1.7 km northeast of Ustra are traces of another medieval fortress, part of the same fortification system.

The defensive wall is 113 m long, 2.8 m thick at the base, 1.75 m at the top, and preserved to a height of up to 8–10 m in places. The outer face of the wall is made of treated stone joined with white mortar. The inside of the wall is filled with rubble stone, jointed abundantly with white mortar. The defensive capabilities of the wall are reinforced with three three-floor towers, one semi-circular and two rectangular. The first floor of the towers served as reservoirs. The tower walls were plastered with mortar plaster, up to 0.2 m thick, produced by mixing mortar with broken bricks and large pieces of pottery. Inside the towers were stone stairs to provide access, parts of which have been preserved in two of them. The entrance to the fortress was located in its easternmost part, accessible through seven steps carved into the rock. The foundations of the room that served as the living quarters of the entrance guards have been preserved. The potential attacked had to pass around the entire space outside the wall and towers.

Inside the protected area are the remains of eight buildings, situated in the southern and southeastern parts. The largest is 11 m long and 6 m wide, and the smallest is 1.7 m long and 0.5 m wide. They likely served living quarters and storage.

The fortress was studied in 1971–1973 by archaeologist Stamen Mihaylov and historian Ivan Balkanski, then curator of the Kardzhali Museum of History. More than 1,000 objects were found during the excavations, including iron arrow tips, bronze and silver crosses, copper coins, clay vessels. A research in 2006 found traces of large scale fortification works on the ridge descending in direction northeast from the promontory, where Ustra is situated.

== History ==
There is little information about the history of Ustra. The archaeological date suggests that fortress was constructed in the 10th century to protect an important trade route. It was taken by the armies of the Bulgarian monarch Simeon I the Great (r. 893–927) in the first decade of the 10th century and was believed to be among the strongholds returned to the Byzantine Empire in 913 as part of a peace deal, in return of the recognition of the imperial title of the Bulgarian rulers, as the first Tsars. The deal was short lived, as the Byzantines provoked the Byzantine–Bulgarian war of 913–927, which ended in a decisive Bulgarian victory. Yet, at the final peace treaty of 927 Ustra was likely among the conquests returned to the Byzantines.

The fortress was mentioned by name in the works of two 13th-century Byzantine chroniclers, George Akropolites and Theodore Skoutariotes. They both recorded the 1254 successful campaign in the region by Bulgarian emperor Michael II Asen, following the recent loss of the lands in the Rhodope Mountains to the Nicaean Empire. Akropolites wrote:

"He [Michael II Asen] descended from the Haemus and when he crossed the Evros, in a short time subjugated huge territory and took many towns without an effort. The populace, who were Bulgarians, took the side of their countrymen and shook the yoke of those who spoke another language. And the fortresses, left only with Roman [Byzantine] guards [...] were easily accessible to the Bulgarians. [...] The fortresses of Ustra, Perperek, Krivus and Efraim, located near Adrianople, surrendered to the Bulgarians."

== Gallery ==
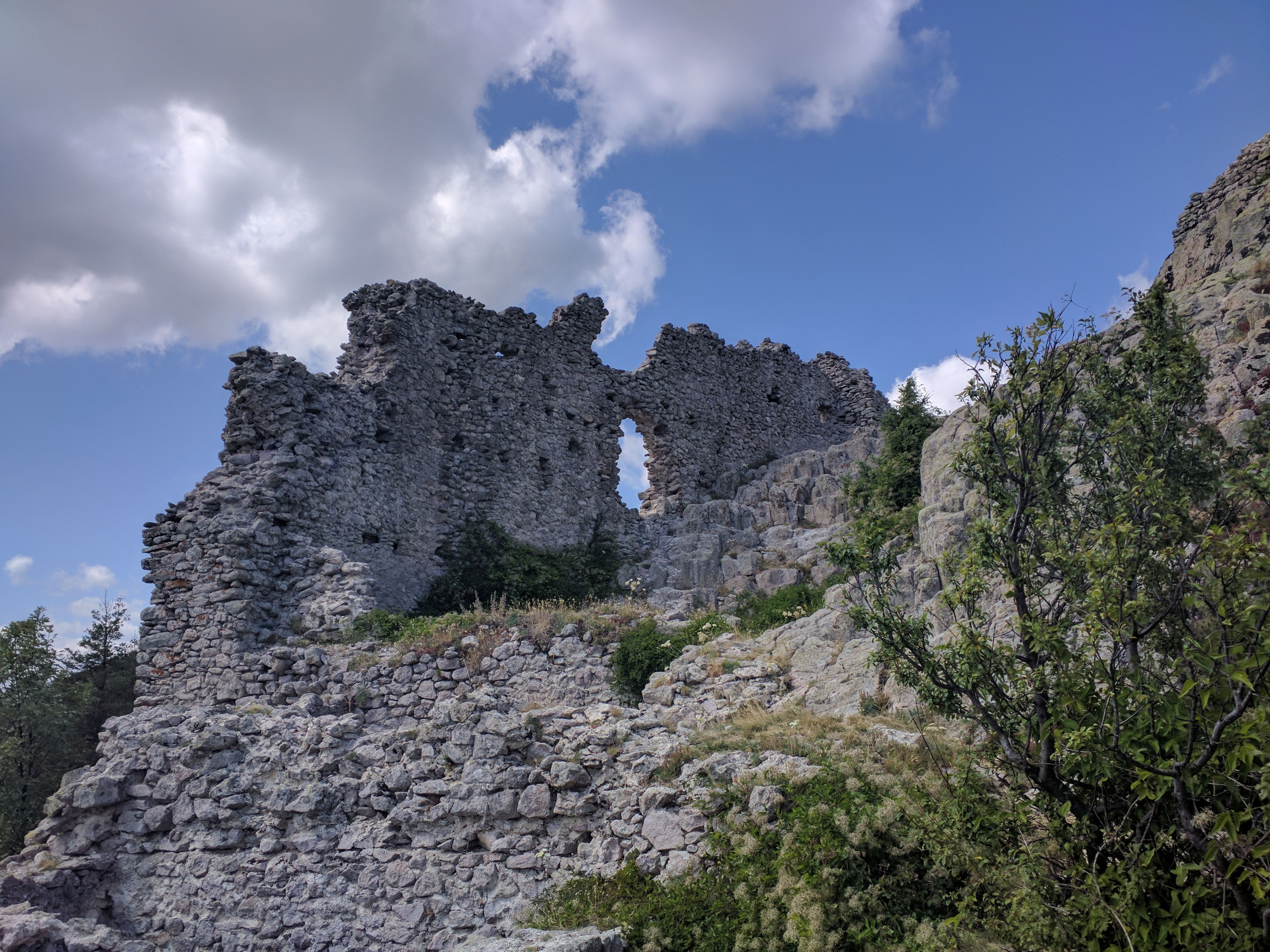

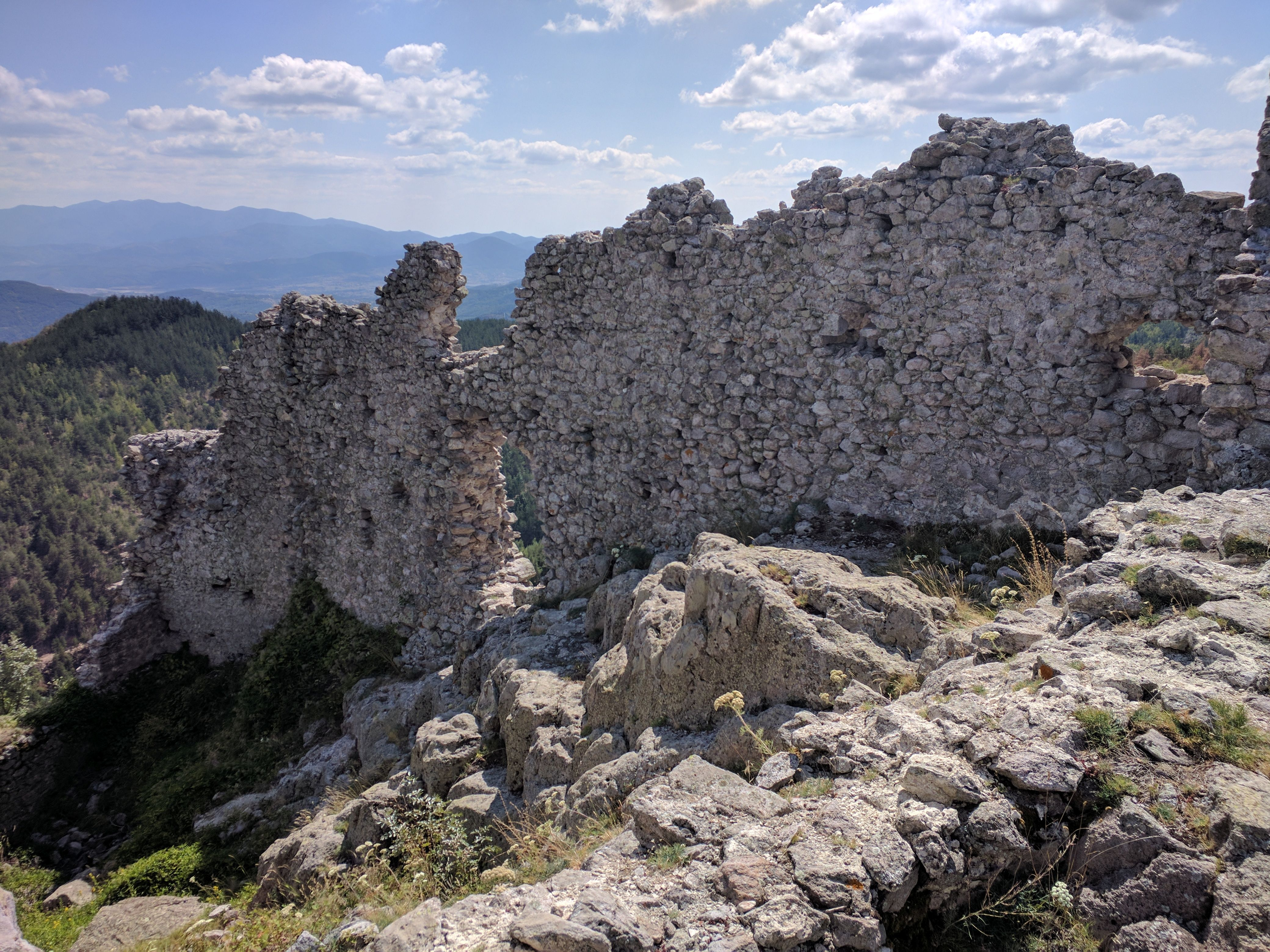

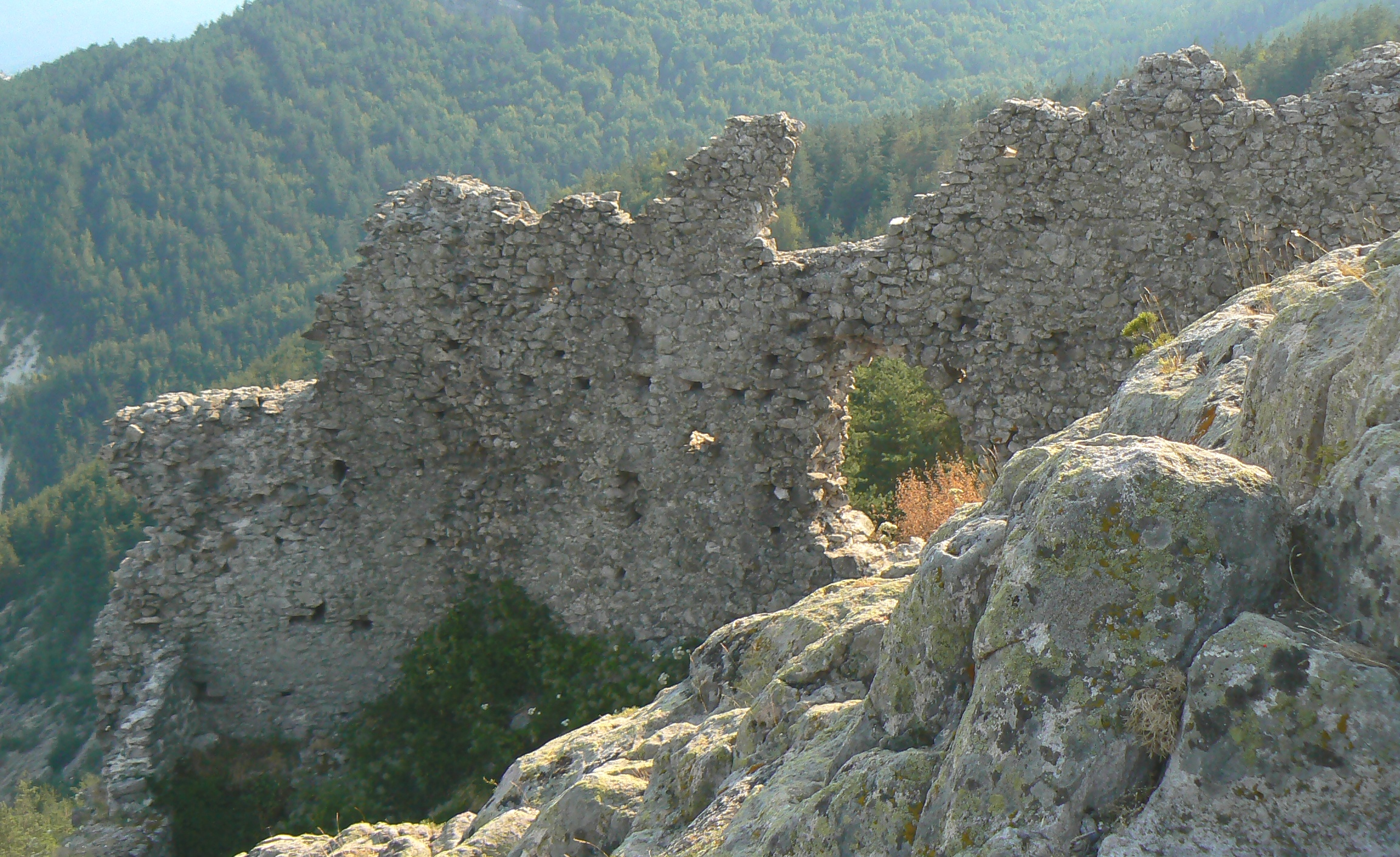

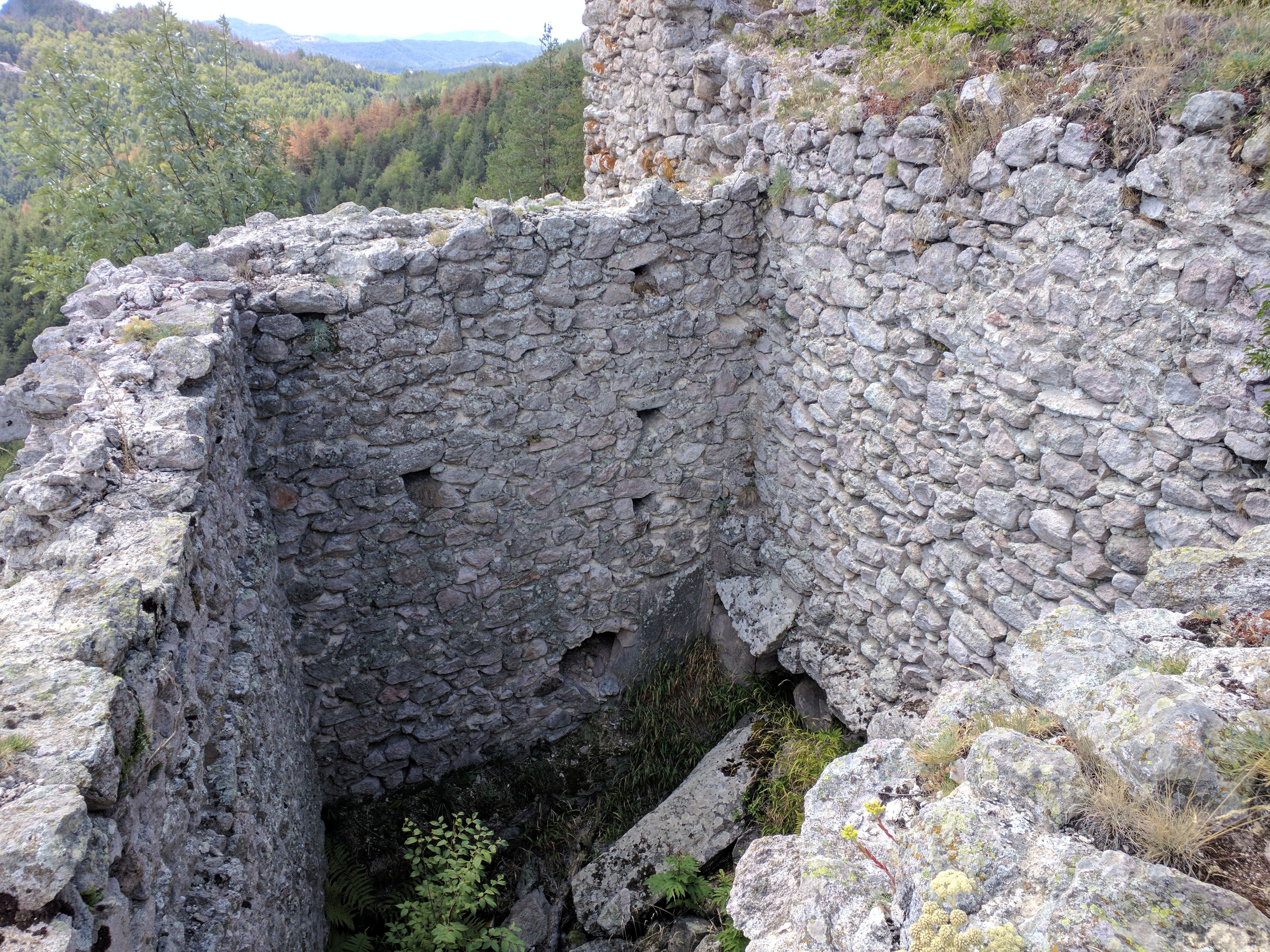
