= Wormuth =

Wormuth is a surname. Notable people with the surname include:

- Christine Wormuth (born 1969), American defense official and civil servant
- Francis D. Wormuth (1909–1980), American lawyer
- Frank Wormuth (born 1960), German footballer and manager

== See also ==
- Wermuth
