= Rut =

Rut may refer to:

== Common meanings ==
- Rut (mammalian reproduction), the period of time when certain ruminants mate
- Rut (roads), a depression or groove worn into a road or path

== Other uses ==
- Rut (name)
- Rut, Kardzhali Province, a village in southern Bulgaria
- Rut, Tolmin, a village in western Slovenia
- The Ruts, a reggae-influenced British punk rock band
- "Rut" (song), a 2017 song by the Killers
- The Rut, American skyrunning race
- Ticker symbol for the Russell 2000 Index
- acronym for Rho utilisation site in genetics

== See also ==
- RUT (disambiguation)
- Rutland
