= Wermuth =

Wermuth is a surname. Notable people with the surname include:

- Arthur W. Wermuth, American army officer
- Camille G. Wermuth (died 2015), French chemist
- Cédric Wermuth (born 1986), Swiss politician
- Jochen Wermuth (born 1969), German investor
- Nanny Wermuth (born 1943), statistician
- Rut Wermuth (1928–2021), Polish Holocaust survivor

== See also ==
- Vermouth
