= Iliysk =

Iliysk, from various forms of Russian Илийск (Ilijsk), may refer to:

- Qonayev, a city in Kazakhstan formerly known as Novoiliysk and Iliysk
- Ile District, Kazakhstan, formerly known as the Iliysk District
- Ili Kazakh Autonomous Prefecture, formerly known as the Iliysk Region, particularly during its period of Russian occupation

== See also ==
- Iliysko, Bulgaria
- Dungan Revolt (1862–1877), whose Ili Sultanate appears as Ilijsk in Russian sources
- Taranchi, whose dialect of the Uyghur language appears as Ilijsk in Russian sources
