= Mrezhichko =

Mrezhichko may refer to the following places:

== Bulgaria ==
- Mrezhichko, Burgas Province
- Mrezhichko, Kardzhali Province

== North Macedonia ==
- Mrezhichko, North Macedonia
