= Matthew Wren (writer) =

English politician (1629–1672)

Secretary to the Admiralty
- In office 4 September 1667 – 14 June 1672
- Preceded by: William Coventry
- Succeeded by: John Werden

Personal details
- Born: 20 August 1629
- Died: 4 September 1672 (aged 43)
- Parent(s): Matthew Wren; Elizabeth Cutler

Matthew Wren (20 August 1629 – 14 June 1672) was an English politician and writer. He is now known as an opponent of James Harrington, and a monarchist who made qualified use of the ideas of Thomas Hobbes. He also held political office in the admiralty.

== Life ==
He was the eldest child of the Royalist Bishop of Ely Matthew Wren and Elizabeth, daughter of Thomas Cutler of Ipswich, and therefore cousin of Sir Christopher Wren. He was educated at both Peterhouse, Cambridge and the University of Oxford, graduating M.A. at Oxford on 9 September 1661.

He was secretary to Edward Hyde, Earl of Clarendon, from 1660 to 1667, M.P. for St. Michael (1661 to 1672), and Secretary to the Admiralty under James, Duke of York, the Lord High Admiral of England, from 1667 to 1672. He was fatally injured accompanying the duke at the Battle of Solebay in 1672 and died on his return to Greenwich. He was buried with his father at Pembroke Hall, Cambridge.

He was one of the council of the Royal Society named in Charles II's original charter, dated 15 July 1662, and was a prominent member of the Society.

He was a prominent investor in The African Company and therefore both a beneficiary and supporter of the transatlantic slave trade.

== Works ==
He wrote:

- Considerations on Mr. Harrington's ... Oceana, 1657, 12mo (anon.)
- Monarchy Asserted. In Vindication of the Considerations, 1659 8vo, 2nd edit. 1660, 8vo, to which Harrington replied in his Politicaster, London, 1659, 8vo.

J. G. A. Pocock describes him as the leading contemporary opponent of Harrington, and an illustration in his views of the theory of possessive individualism of C. B. Macpherson. Francis D. Wormuth writes that Wren reversed the relation between politics and economics found in Harrington. According to I. Bernard Cohen, Wren may have been the first, in Monarchy Asserted, to apply the term 'revolution' to the English Revolution. The book was dedicated to John Wilkins, and Wren's introduction explained that the anonymous Considerations had been taken by Harrington to come from the whole group of Oxford experimentalists around Wilkins (to which Wren belonged, as did his more famous cousin Christopher Wren).
