= Nedzhmi Ali =

Bulgarian politician

- Неджми Али
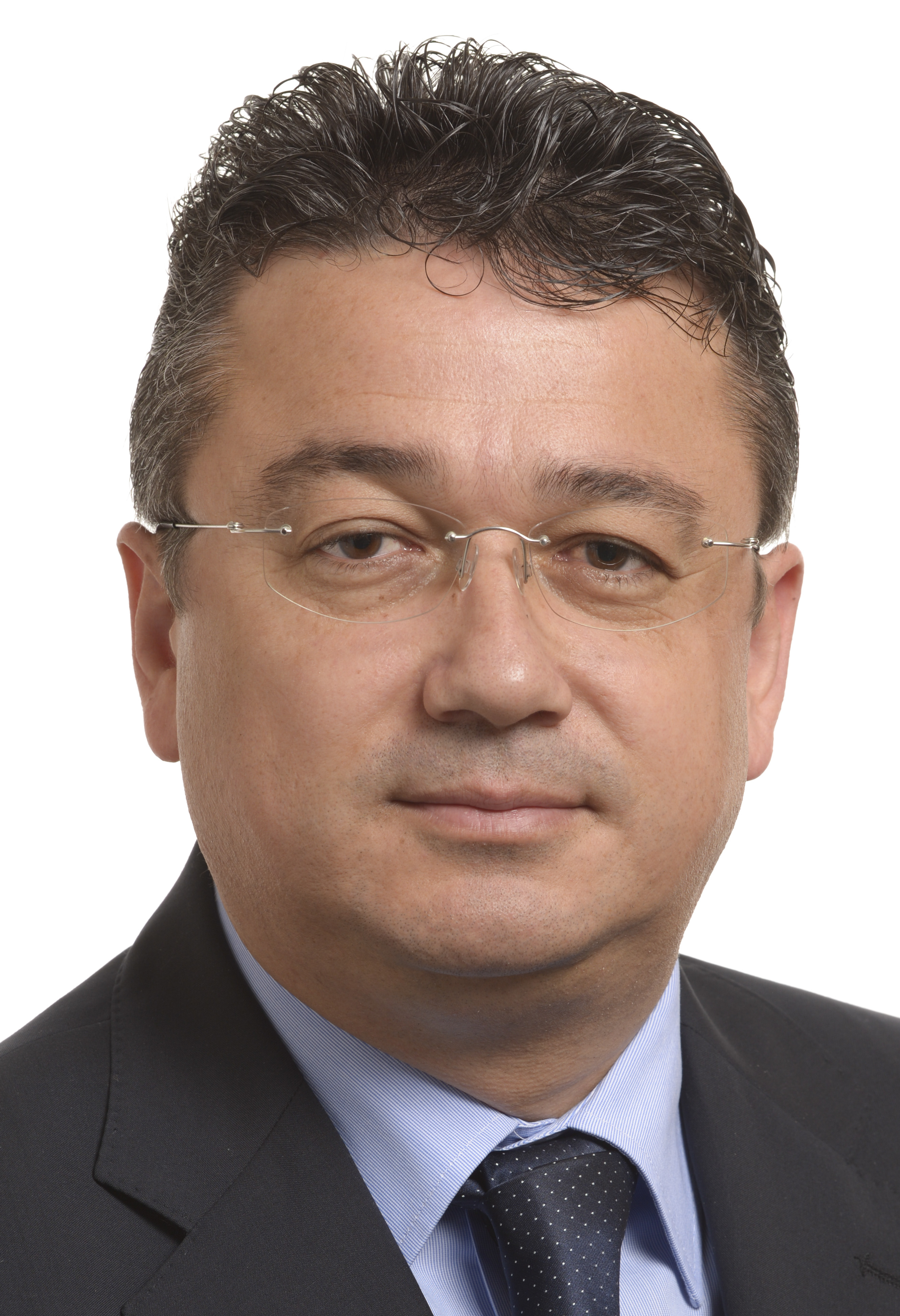

Member of the European Parliament for Bulgaria
- In office 2014–2019

Personal details
- Born: 16 July 1972 (age 53) Dzhebel, Bulgaria
- Profession: Politician

Nedzhmi Niyazi Ali (Bulgarian: Неджми Ниязи Али; born 16 July 1972 in Dzhebel, Bulgaria) is a Bulgarian politician of Bulgarian-Turkish descent and Member of the European Parliament (MEP). He is a member of the Movement for Rights and Freedoms.

== Biography ==
Ali became a Member of the European Parliament of 2004–9 with effect from 1 January 2007 upon the accession of Bulgaria to the European Union.

In 2013 he was appointed to the post of Bulgarian Vice-minister of Defence.

In May 2014 he returned to the European Parliament as an elected MEP. He currently sits on the Committee on Budgets and the Committee on Budgetary Control.
