= Victor Zorza =

Zorza, Victor
- Victor Zorza in India in the early 1980s
- Born: 19 October 1925; Kołomyja, Stanisławów Voivodeship, Poland
- Died: 20 March 1996 (aged 70); Hammersmith Hospital, London
- Other names: Wermuth, Israel
- Occupation: Journalist
- Known for: Kremlinologist, Hospice Advocate

Victor Zorza (born Israel Wermuth; 19 October 1925 – 20 March 1996) was a Polish born journalist who contributed to the West's understanding of the Soviet Union, and was later known for pioneering work promoting palliative care in Russia.

== Early life ==
Israel Wermuth was born on 19 October 1925, in the small town of Kołomyja, Stanislawowskie in eastern Poland (now Kolomyia in Ukraine). His parents were Polish Jews who owned a shop in the town. In 1939, after the Red Army invaded eastern Poland, the Soviets declared the family as bourgeois, and confiscated their shop. As the Germans swept into Poland in 1941, the 15-year-old fled eastward as his family was rounded up and sent to the Kolomyja ghetto, and then to Belzec death camp. (His younger sister, Rut Wermuth, escaped from the Nazi train to Belzec, survived the war working under false identity as a factory worker and maid inside Germany, and was reunited with Victor in 1994.)

Zorza fled east with the retreating Russians, and was forced to dig trenches with prisoners of war. During this time he narrowly escaped a German air strike, which killed many others in his group. An accident during this time left him with total amnesia, and he never completely recovered his memory. Caught up in the flow of refugees, Zorza was sent to a Soviet work camp in the east. He escaped but was captured and returned. His second escape was more successful, and with help from the author Ilya Ehrenburg, Zorza was able to join up with a Polish Air Force unit that was being formed. He was evacuated to the UK via Iran and India.

After the war ended, Zorza joined the British Broadcasting Corporation (BBC) monitoring service in 1948. He monitored and reported on news from the Soviet bloc. Zorza met Rosemary Wilson, and they married in 1949. They had two children, Richard (born 1949) and Jane (born 1952)

== Journalist ==
Zorza began writing freelance for The Manchester Guardian in 1950 and joined their staff in 1956. He was soon discovered to be a canny analyst of the inner workings of the Soviet Union. He made a series of bold predictions that proved to be accurate and for which he gained considerable respect. In 1956, Zorza's first article was published in The Washington Post. Victor was one of the first analysts to predict the Sino-Soviet split. In 1968, he was awarded the prestigious IPC National Press Awards Journalist of the Year award "for forecasting with astonishing accuracy and against the flow of informed opinion the invasion of Czechoslovakia by the Soviet Union."

== The Hospice movement ==
In 1977, Zorza's daughter, Jane, aged 25, died of cancer in the "Sir Michael Sobell House" hospice. The experience of losing their daughter led to Victor and Rosemary writing an article for The Guardian called "Death of a Daughter". The article was read with much interest and in 1981, they published "A Way to Die", a book detailing their experiences. During a visit to India, Jane had challenged Victor to leave the world of international relations, and instead inform the world about the struggle to survive in the poverty of the developing world. Perhaps partly in tribute to Jane's concern for the poor, Victor went to India, and lived in a remote village in the north called Lakhamandal, accessible only by a precarious hand-pulled cable car across the fast flowing Jamuna River. He wrote a regular column in The Guardian called "Village Voice" in which he turned his keen analytical skills from the world stage to the equally complicated and intriguing interpersonal and inter-caste relationships in the village.

In India, and in his advocacy for the hospice movement, Zorza found new purpose in life and in 1992, a story called "The Four Missions of Victor Zorza" was published in Reader's Digest. Zorza established "The British Russian Hospice Society" whose advocacy in 1990 led to the building Russia's first hospice in St. Petersburg (then Leningrad). In 1991 Rosemary decided to part ways with Victor; his demanding schedule and international travels had preventing him from supporting her in her battle with Parkinson's disease. She married Peter Varney and lived with him until her death in 2000. In 1993, Victor met Eileen Lerche-Thomsen, and she became his life partner, supporting him until his death. Along with Eileen, Victor was energetic in raising funds and awareness for hospices and palliative care in Russia, including the construction of the first hospice in Moscow in 1996.

Zorza had heart problems for much of his later life beginning in the late 70s. He had multiple heart bypass surgeries beginning in 1979, and was restricted in his diet. In January 1996, he had a stent fitted to his heart, and on 20 March 1996, he died at Hammersmith Hospital after his third heart bypass operation.
