= Rut (name) =

Rut is both a surname and a feminine German given name. Notable people with the name include:

- Rut Bízková (born 1957), former Minister of Environment of the Czech Republic
- Rut Brandt (1920–2006), German writer
- Rut Bryk (1916–1999), Finnish ceramist
- Rut Berglund (1897–1984), Swedish opera singer
- Rut Carballido Lopez, Spanish-born microbiologist
- Rut Hillarp (1914–2003), Swedish poet and novelist
- Rut Holm (1900–1971), Swedish film actress
- Rut Arnfjörð Jónsdóttir (born 1990), Icelandic handballer
- Rut Rutka Laskier (1929–1943), Jewish Polish diarist and Holocaust victim
- Rut Blees Luxemburg (born 1967), German photographer
- Rut Wermuth (1928–2021), Jewish German Holocaust survivor
- María Rut Kristinsdóttir, Icelandic politician
- John Rut (fl. 1512–1528), English mariner
- Tadeusz Rut (1931–2002), Polish hammer and discus thrower

== See also ==
- Nicolaes Ruts (1573-1638), merchant whose portrait was painted by Rembrandt
