= Zheladovo =

Zheladovo Желъдово
- Village
- Location within Bulgaria
- Coordinates: 41.4500°N 25.2167°E
- Country: Bulgaria
- Province: Kardzhali Province
- Municipality: Dzhebel
- Time zone: UTC+2 (EET)
  - Summer (DST): UTC+3 (EEST)

Zheladovo is a village in Dzhebel Municipality, Kardzhali Province, southern Bulgaria. The population is 84 citizens.

== Politics ==
In the local office of Zhelydovo, which includes Zhelydovo, the post of mayor is held by Mustafa Redjeb Musa (a member of the Movement for Rights and Freedoms (DPS)) who is elected by the citizens.

The mayor of Kmet and the Jebel Community is Bahri Rejeb Yumer (a member of the Movement for Rights and Freedoms (DPS)). His appointment is based on election results.
