= Ustren =

Village in Bulgaria

Coordinates: 41°28′N 25°14′E

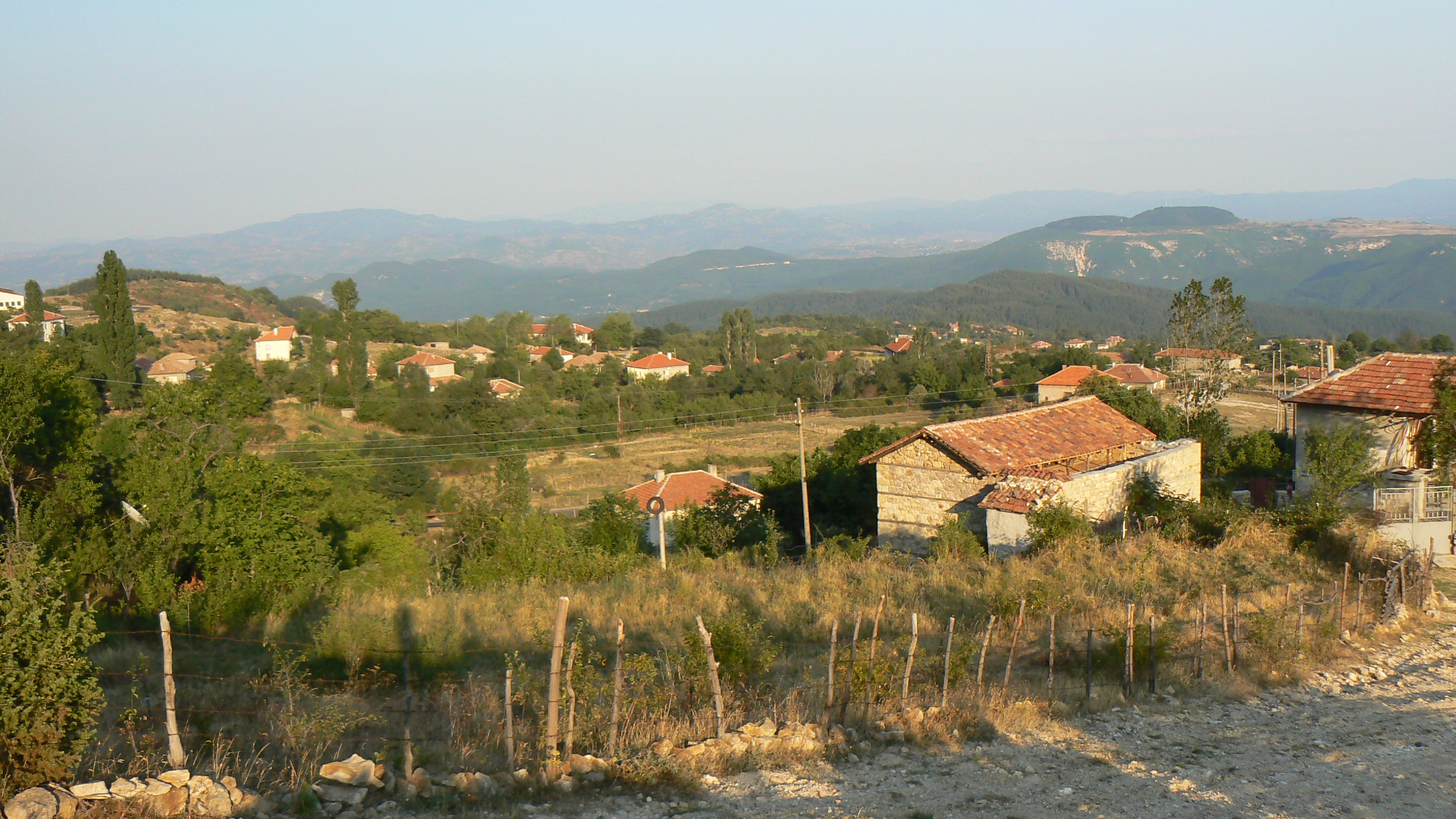
A view of the village

Ustren (Bulgarian: Устрен) is a village in the municipality of Dzhebel, Kardzhali Province, southern Bulgaria. Its population was 230 as of 2011. Of the inhabitants whose ethnicity was identified, 216 were Turkish; no other ethnicities were identified in the village. The Turkish name for the village is Ustra or Ustura.

The village is situated 11 km to the southwest of Dzhebel in a mountainous area in the eastern Rhodopes and has a school, a chitalishte, and a mosque. Its most famous sight is the medieval fortress of Ustra, located approximately 2.5 kilometers from the village.

== See also ==
- List of villages in Kardzhali Province
