= Dushinkovo =

Dushinkovo Душинково
- Village
- Location within Bulgaria
- Coordinates: 41.4667°N 25.3000°E
- Country: Bulgaria
- Province: Kardzhali Province
- Municipality: Dzhebel

Area
  - Total: 6 km^{2} (2.3 sq mi)
- Elevation: 398 m (1,306 ft)

Population (2011)
  - Total: 104
- Time zone: UTC+2 (EET)
  - Summer (DST): UTC+3 (EEST)

Dushinkovo is a village in Dzhebel Municipality, Kardzhali Province, southern Bulgaria.

The village of Dushinkovo has 104 inhabitants (2011 census). All inhabitants are ethnic Turks and are Muslim by religion. It had a much larger population (around 600 people) in the 1980s, but most inhabitants emigrated because of the assimilation policy towards ethnic Turks during Communist rule.
