= Shterna =

Shterna Щерна
- Village
- Location within Bulgaria
- Coordinates: 41.5167°N 25.2167°E
- Country: Bulgaria
- Province: Kardzhali Province
- Municipality: Dzhebel
- Time zone: UTC+2 (EET)
  - Summer (DST): UTC+3 (EEST)

Shterna is a village in Dzhebel Municipality, Kardzhali Province, southern Bulgaria.
