= Brezhana =

Brejana
- Village
- Location within Bulgaria
- Coordinates: 41°29′22″N 25°13′25″E
- Country: Bulgaria
- Province: Kardzhali Province
- Municipality: Dzhebel

Area
  - Total: 2.035 km^{2} (0.786 sq mi)

Population (2007)
  - Total: 20
- Time zone: UTC+2 (EET)
  - Summer (DST): UTC+3 (EEST)

Brejana (Bulgarian: Брежана) is a village in the municipality of Dzhebel, in Kardzhali Province, in southern-central Bulgaria. It covers an area of 2.035 square kilometres (0.786 sq mi) and as of 2007 it had a population of 20 people.
