= Albantsi =

- Village
- Location within Bulgaria
- Coordinates: 41.5°N 25.26667°E
- Country: Bulgaria
- Province: Kardzhali Province
- Municipality: Dzhebel

Area
  - Total: 0.807 km^{2} (0.312 sq mi)

Population (2007)
  - Total: 2
- Time zone: UTC+2 (EET)
  - Summer (DST): UTC+3 (EEST)

Albantsi (Bulgarian: Албанци) is a village in the municipality of Dzhebel, in Kardzhali Province, in southern-central Bulgaria. It is located 207.79 kilometres (129.11 mi) southeast of Sofia. It covers an area of 0.807 square kilometres and as of 2007 it had a population of 2 people.
