= Potoche =

Potoche Поточе
- Village
- Location within Bulgaria
- Coordinates: 41.5500°N 25.3000°E
- Country: Bulgaria
- Province: Kardzhali Province
- Municipality: Dzhebel
- Time zone: UTC+2 (EET)
  - Summer (DST): UTC+3 (EEST)

Potoche is a village in Dzhebel Municipality, Kardzhali Province, southern Bulgaria.
