= William Coventry =

17th-century English statesman

Sir William Coventry PC
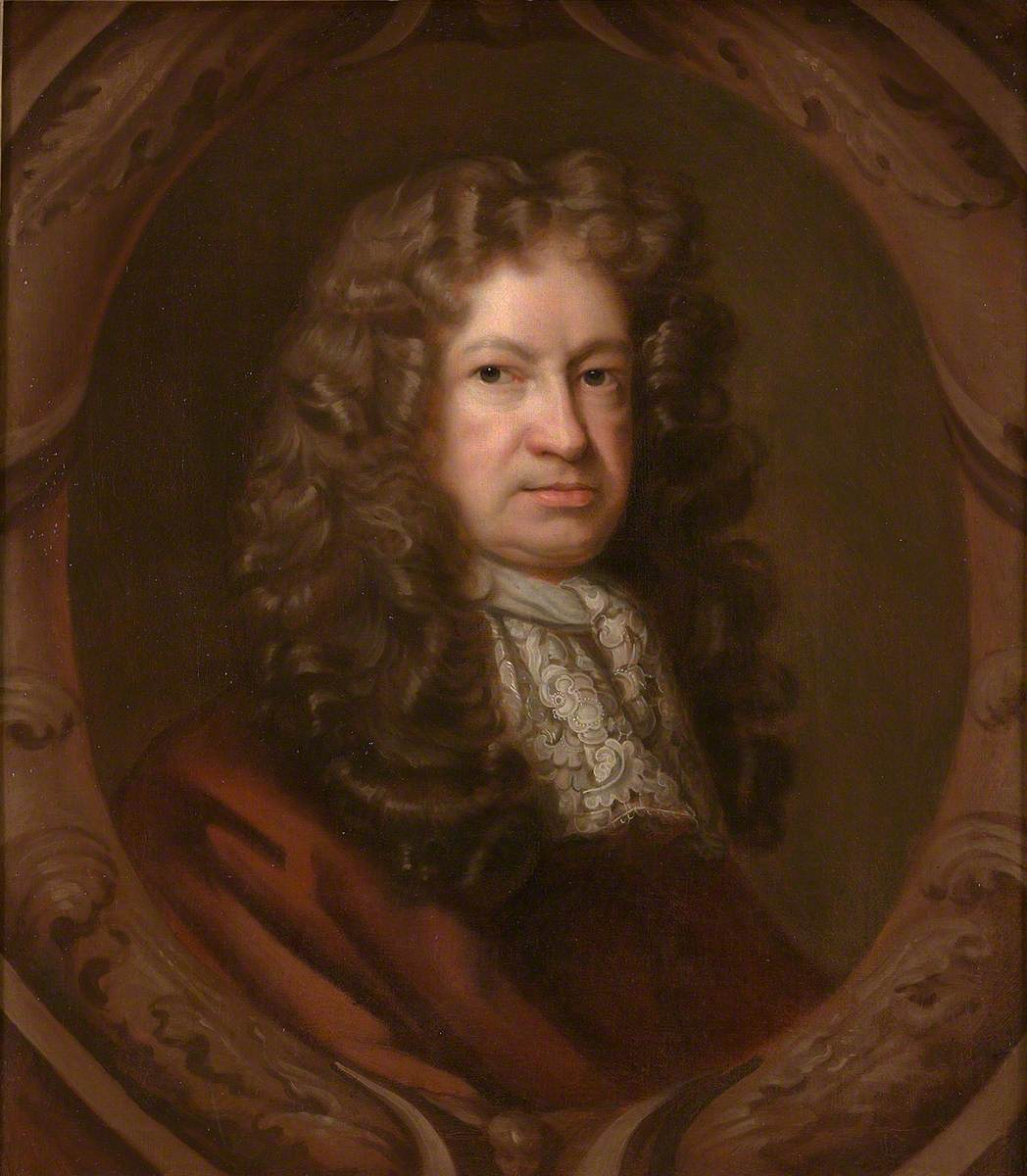
- Portrait by Mary Beale

Secretary to the Admiralty
- In office July 1660 – 4 September 1667
- Preceded by: Office established
- Succeeded by: Matthew Wren

Privy Counsellor
- In office 26 June 1665 – 5 March 1669

Personal details
- Born: 4 October 1627
- Died: 23 June 1686 (aged 58)
- Parent(s): Thomas Coventry, 1st Baron Coventry; Elizabeth Aldersley

Sir William Coventry PC (4 October 1627 – 23 June 1686) was an English statesman.

== Early life and Civil War ==
William was the son of the lord keeper Thomas Coventry, 1st Baron Coventry, by his second wife Elizabeth Aldersley. Coventry matriculated at The Queen's College, Oxford, at the age of fourteen. Owing to the outbreak of the English Civil War he was forced to abandon his studies, but according to Sir John Bramston, the younger he had a good tutor, and through travelling, he learned to speak the French language fluently. He was young at the time of the war, yet Clarendon wrote that he joined the army and had the command of a foot company and shortly afterwards went to France. Here he remained till all hopes of obtaining foreign assistance and of raising a new army had to be laid aside when he returned to England and kept aloof from the various royalist intrigues. When the prospect of a restoration appeared in 1660, Coventry hurried to Breda, was appointed secretary to James, Duke of York and headed the royal procession when Charles II entered London in triumph.

== Restoration of the monarchy ==
Coventry was elected to the Cavalier Parliament of 1661 for Great Yarmouth, became commissioner for the navy in May 1662 and in 1663 was made Doctor of Civil Law at Oxford. His great talents were very soon recognised in parliament, and his influence as an official was considerable. He was appointed Secretary to the Admiralty, a lucrative position (Anthony Wood states that he collected a fortune of £60,000) which also continued his relationship with the Duke of York, who was made Lord High Admiral of England. Accusations of corruption in his naval administration, and especially during the Dutch war, were brought against him, however Samuel Pepys testifies in his diary to the excellence of Coventry's administration and to his zeal for reform and economy; his consistent praise for Coventry is in notable contrast to his strictures on his other colleagues, who are generally referred to as "knaves" or "old fools". Coventry's ability and energy did little to avert the naval collapse, owing chiefly to financial mismanagement and ill-advised appointments.

== 1665–1669 ==
Coventry denied all responsibility for the Dutch War in 1665, and his repudiation is supported by Pepys; it was, moreover, contrary to his well-known political opinions. The war greatly increased his influence, and shortly after the Battle of Lowestoft, on 3 June 1665, he was knighted and made a Privy Councillor (26 June) and was subsequently admitted to the Committee on Foreign Affairs. In September 1667, Coventry resigned as Secretary in favour of Matthew Wren. The same year, he was appointed to the board of treasury to effect financial reforms. "I perceive," writes Pepys on 23 August 1667, "Sir William Coventry is the man and nothing done till he comes", and on his removal in 1669 the Duke of Albemarle, no friendly or partial critic, declares that "nothing now would be well done." His appointment came too late to ward off the naval disaster at Chatham the same year, the Raid on the Medway, and the national bankruptcy in 1672.

Coventry's rising influence had been from the first the cause of increasing jealousy to the Lord Chancellor, Clarendon, who disliked and discouraged the younger generation. Coventry resented this. He became the chief mover in the successful attack on Clarendon, but refused to take any part in his impeachment, although Clarendon never forgave him for what he saw as Coventry's betrayal. Two days after Clarendon's resignation (on 31 August), Coventry announced his intention of terminating his connection with the navy.

As a principal agent in effecting Clarendon's fall, he naturally acquired new power and influence, and was expected to be Clarendon's successor as first minister of the crown. Coventry retained merely his appointment at the treasury, and the brilliant but unscrupulous and incapable George Villiers, 2nd Duke of Buckingham, a favourite of the king, succeeded. The relations between the two men soon became unfriendly. Buckingham ridiculed Coventry's steady attention to business, and was annoyed at his opposition to Clarendon's impeachment. Coventry rapidly lost influence and was excluded from the cabinet council. His career depended now entirely on the support of the Duke of York: but ironically by bringing down Clarendon, Coventry had helped to weaken the influence of the Duke, Clarendon's son-in-law and principal defender.

Finally, in March 1669, Coventry challenged Buckingham for having written a play in which he was ridiculed. Notice of the challenge reached the authorities through the duke's second, and Coventry was imprisoned in the Tower on 3 March and subsequently removed from the Privy Council on 5 March. He was superseded in the treasury on 11 March by Buckingham's favourite, Sir Thomas Osborne, and was at last released from the Tower on 21 March in disgrace. The real cause of his dismissal was the final adoption by Charles of the policy of subservience to France and desertion of the Netherlands and Protestant interests. Six weeks before Coventry's fall, the conference between Charles, James, Arlington, Clifford and Arundel had taken place, which resulted, a year and a half later in the Treaty of Dover. To such schemes, Coventry, with his steady hostility to France and active devotion to Protestantism, was doubtless a formidable opponent. He now withdrew definitely from official life, still retaining, however, his ascendancy in the House of Commons, and leading the party which condemned and criticised the reactionary and fatal policy of the government, his credit and reputation being rather enhanced than diminished by his dismissal.

== 1670s ==
In 1673 a pamphlet entitled England's appeal from the Private Cabal at Whitehall to the Great Council of the Nation by a true Lover of his Country went through five editions. The anonymous work was universally ascribed to Coventry, and forcefully reflects his opinions on the French entanglement. In the great matter of the Indulgence, while refusing to discuss the limits of prerogative and liberty, he argued that the dispensing power of the crown could not be valid during the session of parliament, and criticised the manner of the declaration while approving its ostensible object. He supported the Test Act, but maintained a statesmanlike moderation amidst the tide of indignation rising against the government, and refused to take part in the personal attacks upon ministers, drawing upon himself the same unpopularity as his nephew, George Savile, 1st Marquess of Halifax, incurred later. In the same year, he denounced the alliance with France. He showed his appreciation for the loyalty Samuel Pepys had always displayed to him by vigorously supporting Pepys' right to sit in the House of Commons (to which he was elected in 1673), and ridiculing the claims (which were entirely unfounded) that Pepys was a Roman Catholic.

During the summer of 1674, he was again received at court. In 1675 he supported the bill to exclude Roman Catholics from both Houses, and also the measure to close the House of Commons to placemen; and he showed great activity in his opposition to the French connection, especially stigmatising the encouragement given by the government to the levying of troops for the French service. In May 1677 he voted for the Dutch alliance. Like most of his contemporaries, he accepted the story of the Popish Plot in 1678. Coventry several times refused the highest court appointments, and he was not included in Sir W. Temple's new-modelled council in April 1679.

== 1680s ==
In the exclusion question he favoured at first a policy of limitations, and on his nephew Halifax, who on his retirement became the leader of the moderate party, he enjoined prudence and patience, and greatly regretted the violence of the opposition which eventually excited a reaction and ruined everything. He refused to stand for the new parliament, and retired to his country residence at Minster Lovell near Witney, in Oxfordshire. He died unmarried on 23 June 1686, at Somerhill near Tunbridge Wells, where he had gone to take the waters, and was buried at Penshurst, where a monument was erected to his memory at St John the Baptist, Penshurst. In his will he ordered his funeral to be at small expense, and left £2000 to the French Protestant refugees in England, besides £3000 for the liberation of captives held by the Barbary Pirates in Algiers. He had shortly before his death already paid for the liberation of sixty slaves. He was much beloved and respected in his family circle, his nephew, Henry Savile, alluding to him in affectionate terms as "our dearest uncle and incomparable friend".

== Assessment ==
Writing Coventry's biography in the Encyclopædia Britannica, Eleventh Edition, Philip Chesney Yorke stated that "though Sir William Coventry never filled that place in the national administration to which his merit and exceptional ability clearly entitled him, his public life together with his correspondence are sufficient to distinguish him from amongst his contemporaries as a statesman of the first rank. Lord Halifax obviously derived from his honoured mentor those principles of government which, by means of his own brilliant intellectual gifts, originality and imaginative insight, gained further force and influence. Halifax owed to him his interest in the navy and his grasp of the necessity of a country of a powerful maritime force. He drew his antagonism to France, his religious tolerance, and wider religious views but firm Protestantism doubtless from the same source. Sir William was the original Trimmer".

Writing to his nephew Thomas Thynne, 1st Viscount Weymouth, while denying the authorship of The Character of a Trimmer, he says, "I have not been ashamed to own myself to be a trimmer... one who would sit upright and not overturn the boat by swaying too much to either side." He shared the Trimmers' dislike of party, urging Halifax in the exclusion contest not to be thrust by the opposition of his enemies into another party, but that he keep upon a national bottom which at length will prevail. His prudence was expressed in his perpetual unwillingness to do things which he could not undo. A singular independence of spirit, a breadth of mind which refused to be contracted by party formulas, a sanity which was proof against the contagion of national delirium, were equally characteristic of uncle and nephew. Sir William Coventry's conceptions of statesmanship, under the guiding hand of his nephew, largely inspired the future revolution settlement, and continued to be an essential condition of English political growth and progress.

== Bibliography ==
Besides the tract already mentioned, Coventry was the author of A Letter to Dr Burnet giving an Account of Cardinal Pools Secret Powers... (1685). The Character of a Trimmer, often ascribed to him, is now known to have been written by Lord Halifax. Notes concerning the Poor, and an essay concerning the decay of rents and the remedy, are among the Malet Papers (Hist. MSS. Comm. Ser. 5th Rep. app. 320 (a)) and Add. MSS. Brit. Mus. (cal. 1882–1887); an Essay concerning France (4th Rep. app. 229 (b)) and a Discourse on the Management of the Navy (23ob) are among the MSS. of the marquess of Bath, also a catalogue of his library (233(a)).
