= RUT =

RUT may refer to:

- Registro Único Tributario, the Colombian unique taxpayer identification number
- Rol Único Tributario, the Chilean taxation unique contributor roll identification number
- Rutland, county in England, Chapman code
- Rutland Railroad, a former railroad in the northeastern United States
- Rutland–Southern Vermont Regional Airport (IATA code), a state-owned public-use airport located in North Clarendon, Vermont
- Rutherglen railway station (station code), a railway station that serves Rutherglen, South Lanarkshire, Scotland
- Ruthven railway station, Melbourne

== See also ==
- Rut (disambiguation)
