= Chakaltsi =

Chakaltsi Чакалци
- Village
- Location in Bulgaria
- Coordinates: 41°29′56″N 25°20′00″E
- Country: Bulgaria
- Province: Kardzhali Province
- Municipality: Dzhebel
- Time zone: UTC+2 (EET)
  - Summer (DST): UTC+3 (EEST)

Chakaltsi is a village in Dzhebel Municipality, Kardzhali Province, southern Bulgaria.
