= Tsvyatovo =

Tsvyatovo Цвятово
- Village
- Location within Bulgaria
- Coordinates: 41.5333°N 25.2833°E
- Country: Bulgaria
- Province: Kardzhali Province
- Municipality: Dzhebel

Population (2011)
  - Total: 3
- Time zone: UTC+2 (EET)
  - Summer (DST): UTC+3 (EEST)

Tsvyatovo is a village in Dzhebel Municipality, Kardzhali Province, southern Bulgaria.

The village has only 3 inhabitants as of 2011.
