= Slunchogled =

Slunchogled Слънчоглед
- Village
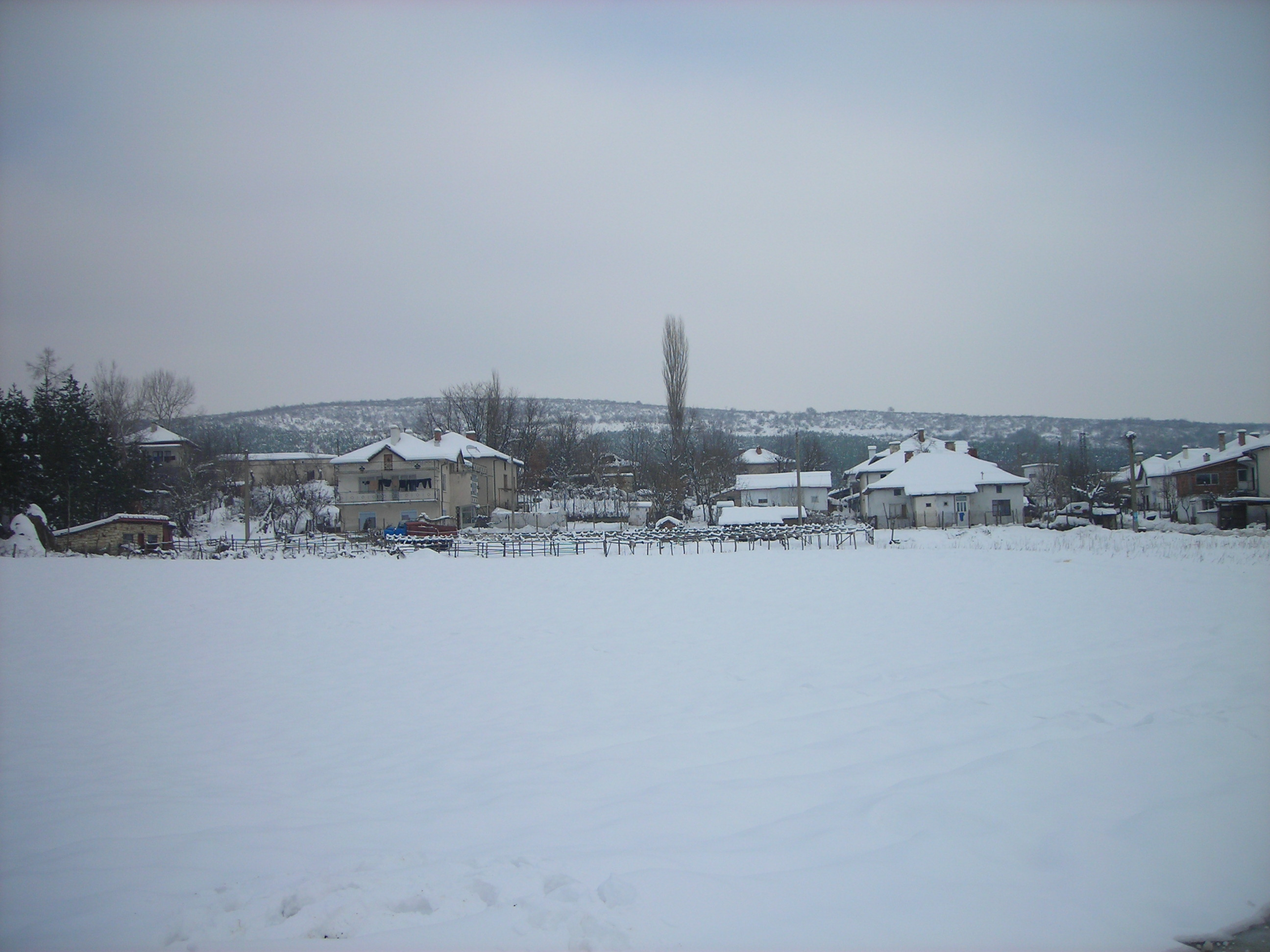
- Village during winter

- Location within Bulgaria
- Coordinates: 41.4833°N 25.3667°E
- Country: Bulgaria
- Province: Kardzhali Province
- Municipality: Dzhebel
- Time zone: UTC+2 (EET)
  - Summer (DST): UTC+3 (EEST)

Slunchogled is a village in Dzhebel Municipality, Kardzhali Province, southern Bulgaria. The village is located in Bulgaria's South-Central Planning Region. At the start of 2014, the village had a population of 196.
