= Podvrah =

Coordinates: 41.5000°N 25.3000°E

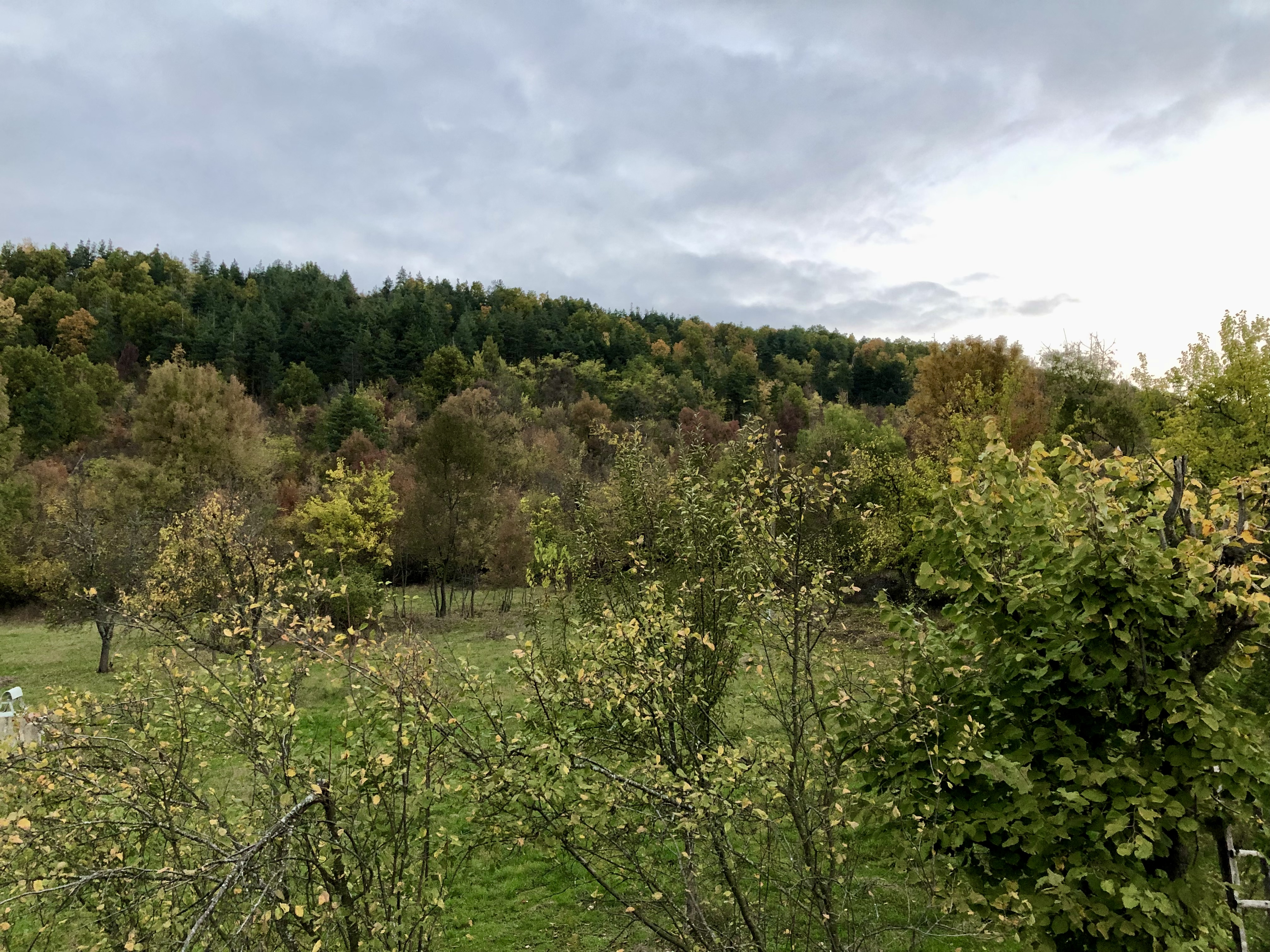

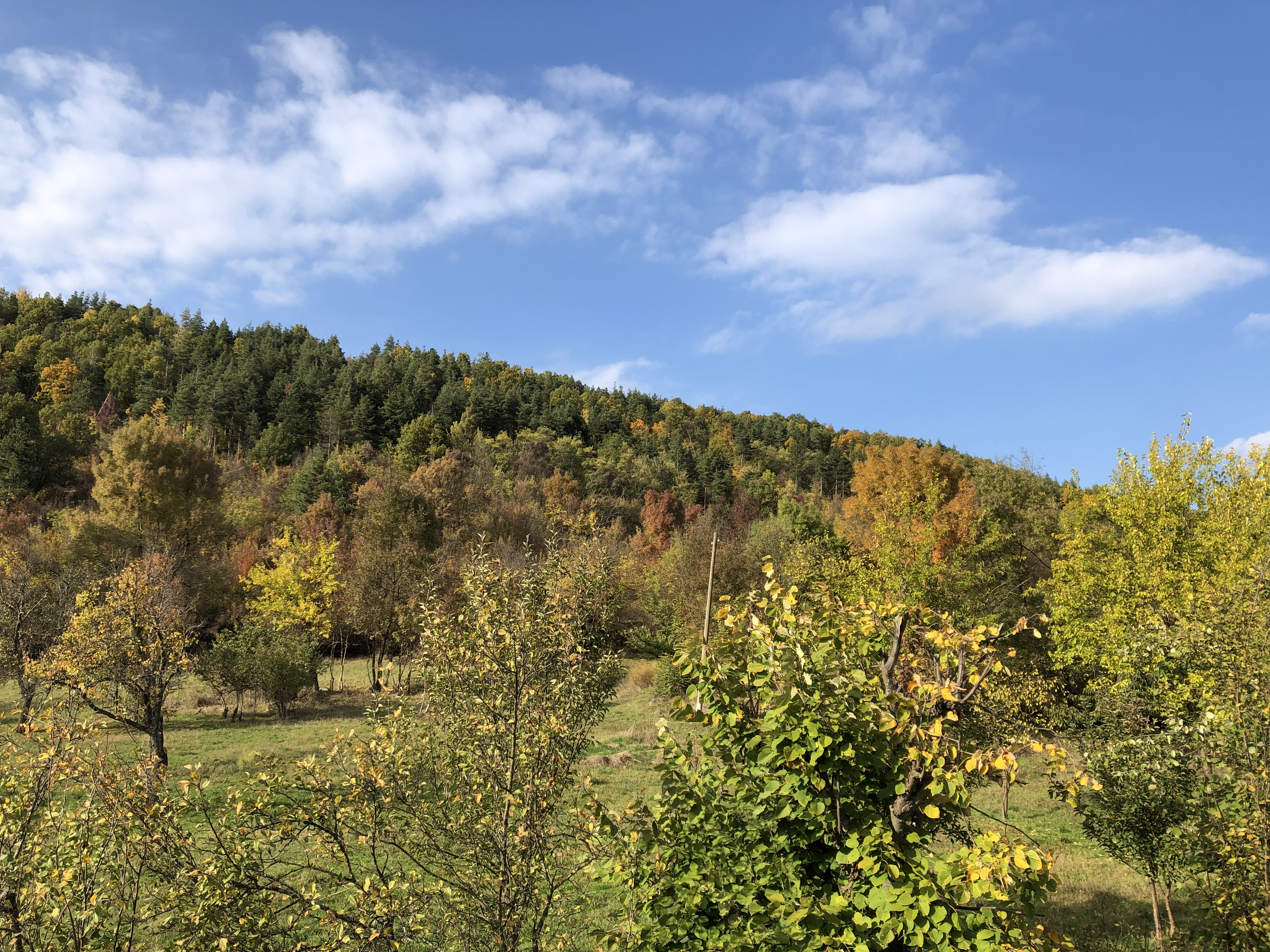

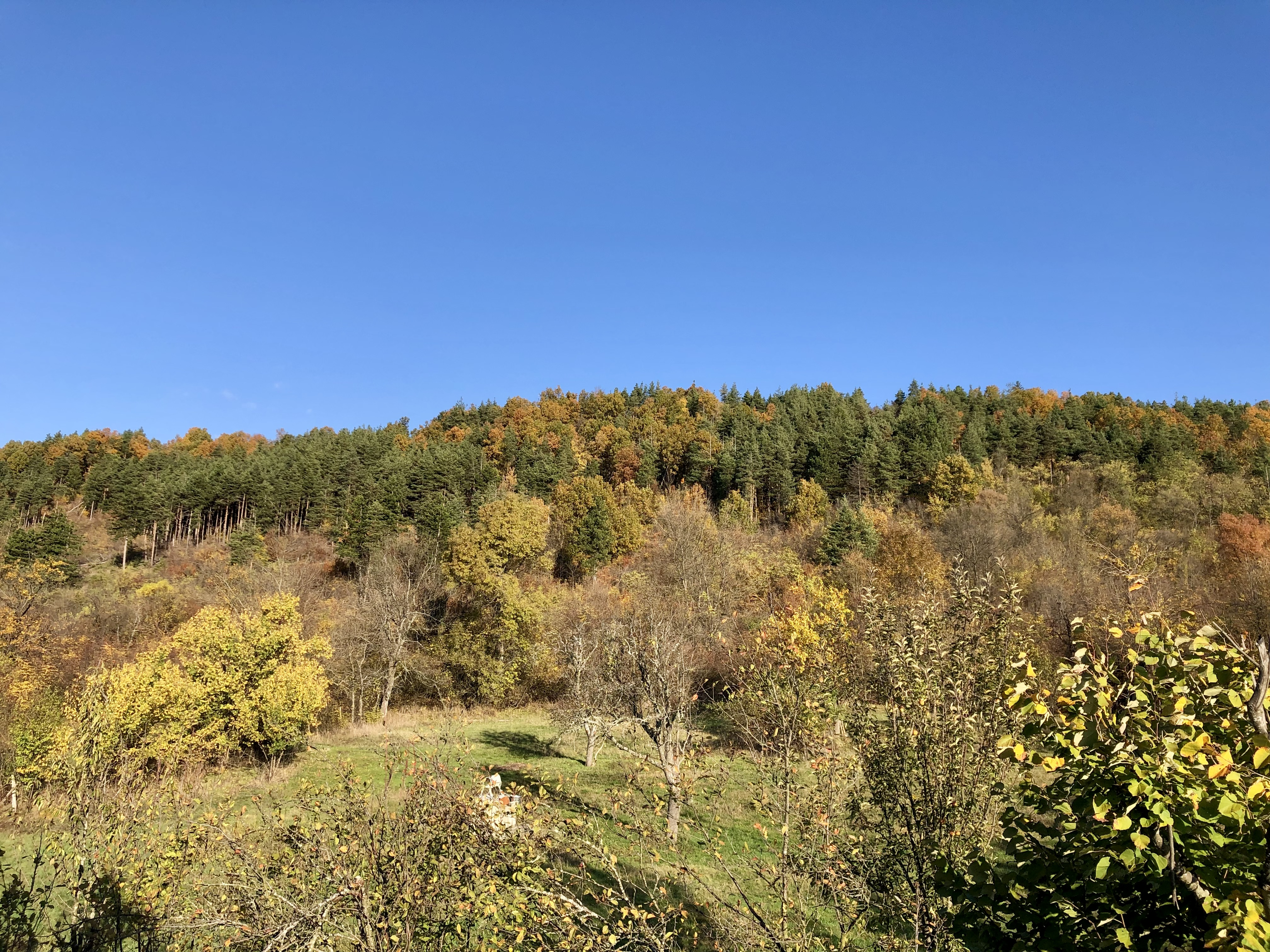

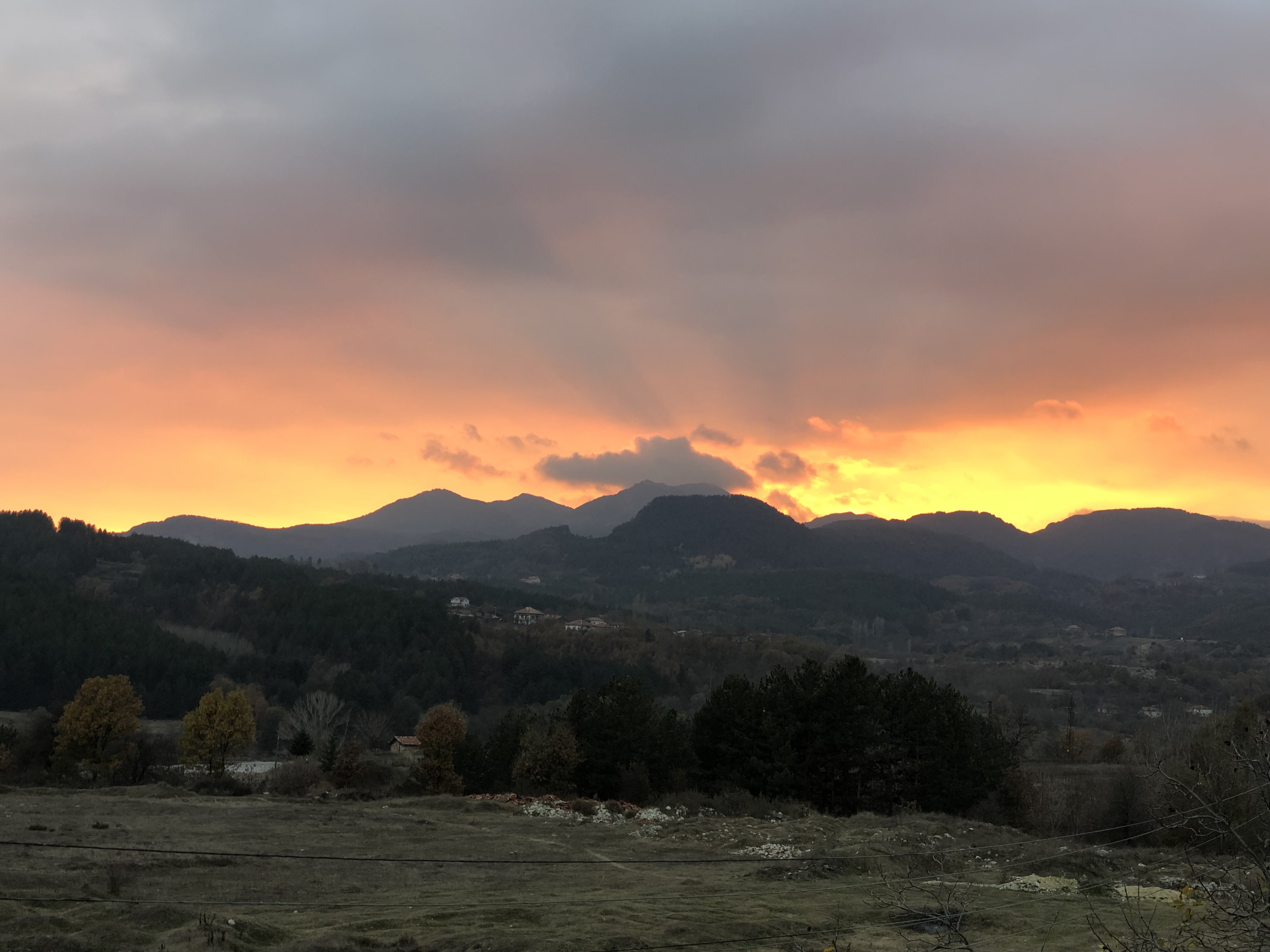

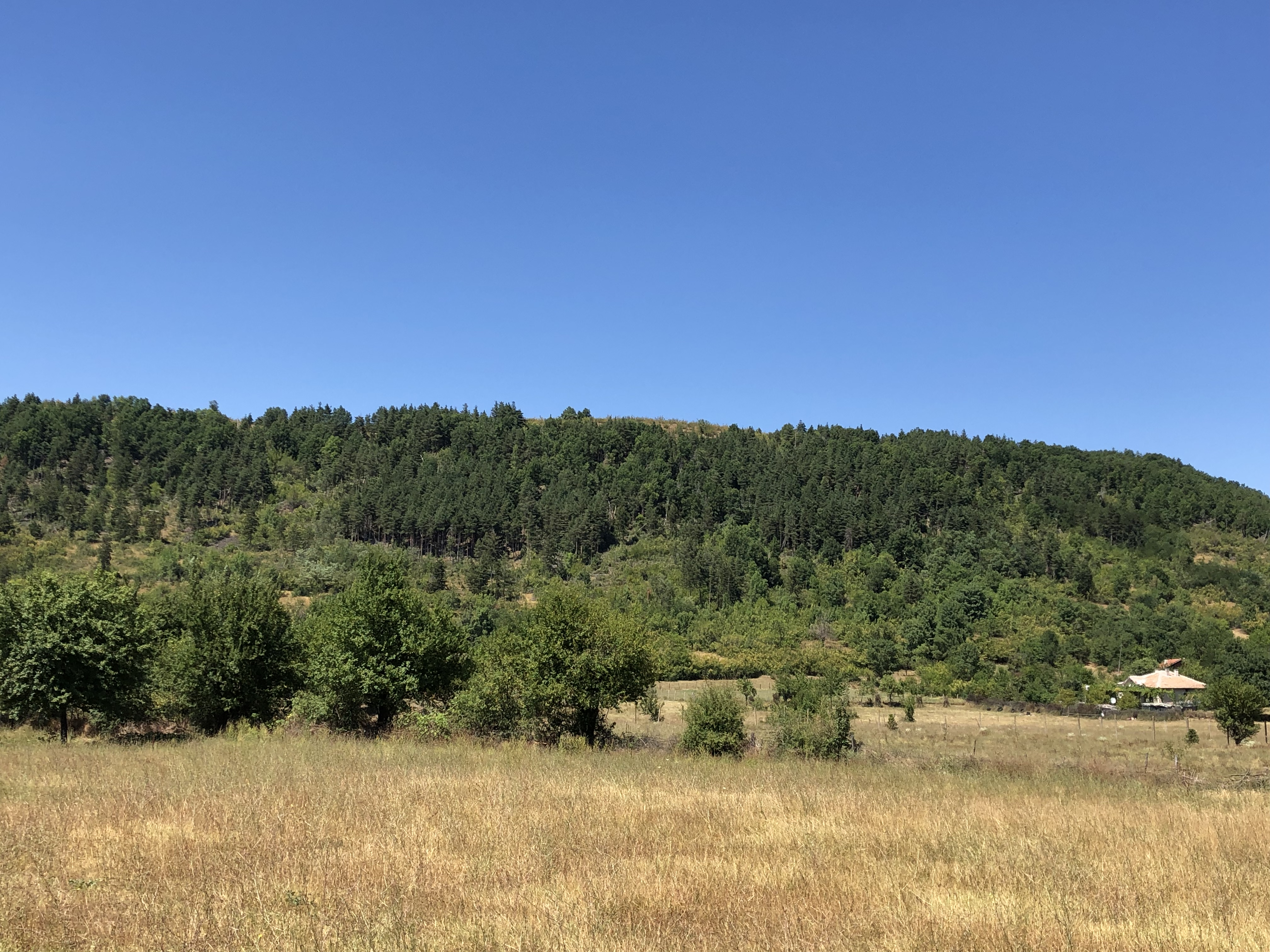

Podvrah is a village in Dzhebel Municipality, Kardzhali Province, southern Bulgaria.

Nestled at the foot of a hill, hence the name "Podvrah" meaning "under the hill." Every corner offers stunning scenery of the surrounding mountains and hills. The Village is beautiful year-round, but spring and autumn are particularly picturesque. Springtime offers the additional charm of seeing newborn lambs. Hiking to the hilltop offers panoramic 360-degree views of the region. You can hike to the top from few different directions!

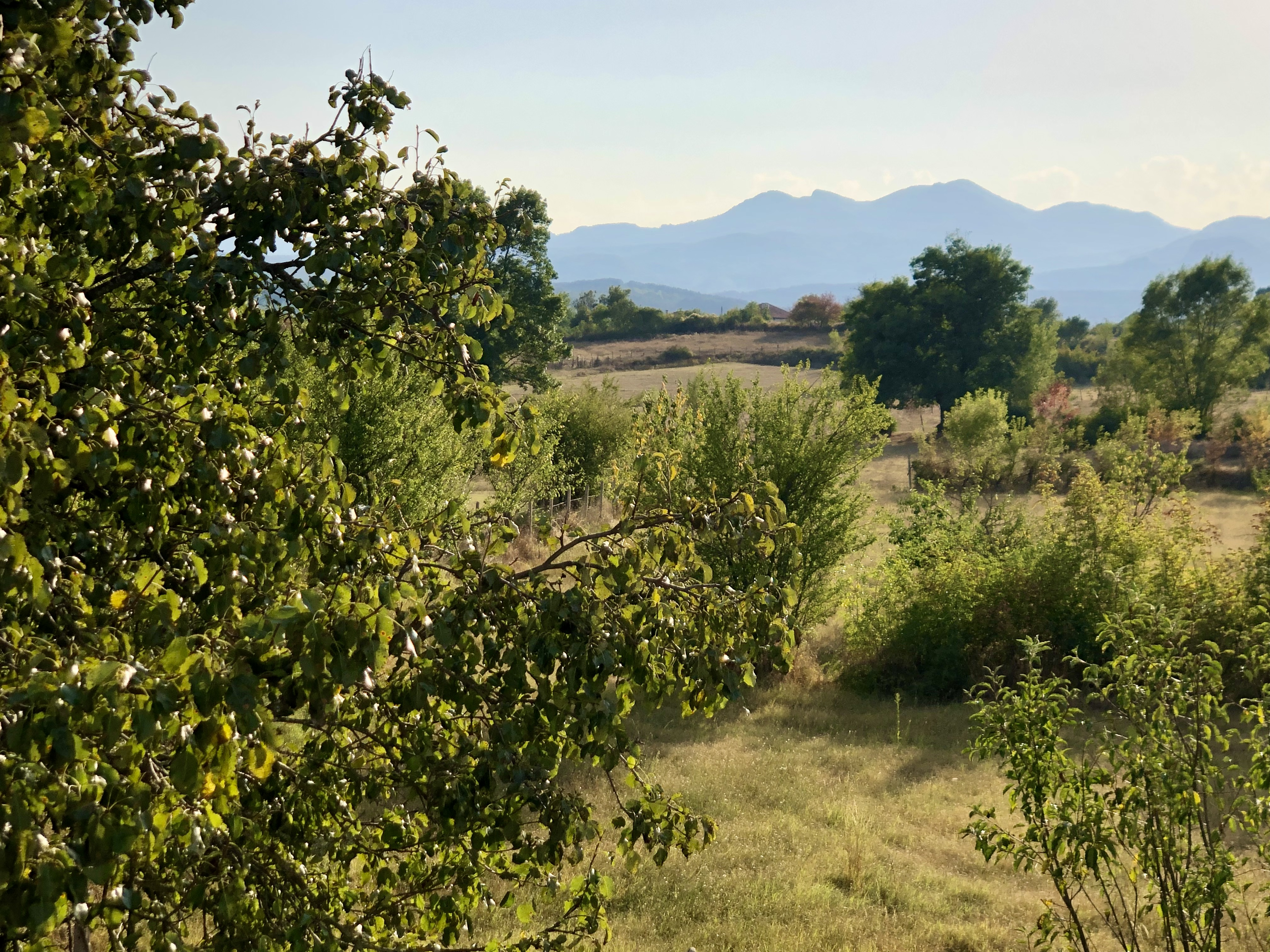

.
