= Velikdenche =

Velikdenche Великденче
- Village
- Location within Bulgaria
- Coordinates: 41.4500°N 25.3500°E
- Country: Bulgaria
- Province: Kardzhali Province
- Municipality: Dzhebel

Population (2024)
  - Total: 244
- Time zone: UTC+2 (EET)
  - Summer (DST): UTC+3 (EEST)

Velikdenche is a village in Dzhebel Municipality, Kardzhali Province, southern Bulgaria. As of 2024 it had a population of 244 people.
