= Sofiytsi =

Sofiytsi Софийци
- Village
- Location within Bulgaria
- Coordinates: 41.5333°N 25.3667°E
- Country: Bulgaria
- Province: Kardzhali Province
- Municipality: Dzhebel
- Time zone: UTC+2 (EET)
  - Summer (DST): UTC+3 (EEST)

Sofiytsi is a village in Dzhebel Municipality, Kardzhali Province, southern Bulgaria.
