= Tyutyunche =

Tyutyunche Тютюнче
- Village
- Location within Bulgaria
- Coordinates: 41.5000°N 25.2667°E
- Country: Bulgaria
- Province: Kardzhali Province
- Municipality: Dzhebel

Population (2011)
  - Total: 103
- Time zone: UTC+2 (EET)
  - Summer (DST): UTC+3 (EEST)

Tyutyunche is a village in Dzhebel Municipality, Kardzhali Province, southern Bulgaria.

It is a mixed village with a Turkish majority and a large Bulgarian minority.
