= Skalina =

Skalina Скалина
- Village
- Location within Bulgaria
- Coordinates: 41.4667°N 25.3167°E
- Country: Bulgaria
- Province: Kardzhali Province
- Municipality: Dzhebel
- Time zone: UTC+2 (EET)
  - Summer (DST): UTC+3 (EEST)

Skalina is a village in Dzhebel Municipality, Kardzhali Province, southern Bulgaria.

Skalina Point on Smith Island, Antarctica is named after the village.
