= Nanny Wermuth =

Swedish statistician

- Born: 4 December 1943 (age 82)
- Spouse: Dr. Dieter Wermuth
- Scientific career
- Fields: Statistics
- Institutions: Chalmers University of Technology; University of Gothenburg
- Thesis: An empirical comparison of regression methods. (1973)
- Doctoral advisor: Arthur Pentland Dempster
- Other academic advisors: David C. Hoaglin

Nanny Wermuth (born 4 December 1943) is the Professor emerita of Statistics, Chalmers University of Technology/University of Gothenburg. Her research interests are Multivariate statistical models and their properties, especially graphical Markov models, as well as their applications in the life sciences and in the natural sciences.

== Academic career ==
=== Education ===
- 1967 First degree in Economics (Diplom-Volkswirtin), LMU Munich
- 1972 Degree in Statistics (Doctor of Philosophy), Harvard University
- 1977 Degree in Medical Statistics (Professor), University of Mainz

=== Professional positions ===
- 1972–1978 Research Assistant in Statistics; University of Dortmund, University of Mainz
- since 1978 Professor of Statistics and of Methods in Psychology, University of Mainz
- 1997–2000 Head of Research and Development, Center of Survey Research, Mannheim
- since 2003 Professor of Statistics, Department of Mathematical Sciences at Chalmers University of Technology and University of Gothenburg

=== Selected services to the profession ===
- 1993–2001 Coordinating member of the European Science Foundation network HSSS
- 1993–2003 Editorial Advisor for the Springer Series of Statistics
- 1995–1996 President, German Region of the International Biometric Society
- 2000–2001 President, International Biometric Society
- 2001–2004 Chair of the Life Science Committee of the International Statistical Institute
- 2008–2009 President, Institute of Mathematical Statistics
- 2007–2010 Associate Editor of Bernoulli

=== Selected recognitions ===
- 1968–1972 Stipends of the Fulbright Commission, of the International Peace Scholarship Fund and of Harvard University
- 1984–1985 Fulbright Scholar, Department of Statistics, Princeton University
- 1992 Max Planck-Research Prize, jointly with Sir David Cox, Oxford
- 2001 Short term Research Fellowship, Australian National University
- 2001–2002 Invited Research Fellow at Harvard’s Radcliffe Institute for Advanced Study
- 2011–2012 Senior Scientist Research Award, International Agency for Research on Cancer

=== Professional affiliations ===
She was elected as member of the International Statistical Institute (1982) and of the German Academy of Sciences (2002); as fellow of the American Statistical Association (1989) and of the Institute of Mathematical Statistics (2001).

== Personal life ==
She has four sons with Dr. Dieter Wermuth - Jochen (1969) Martin (1974), Peter (1976) and Ulli (1981)
