= Jochen Wermuth =

German investor (born 1969)

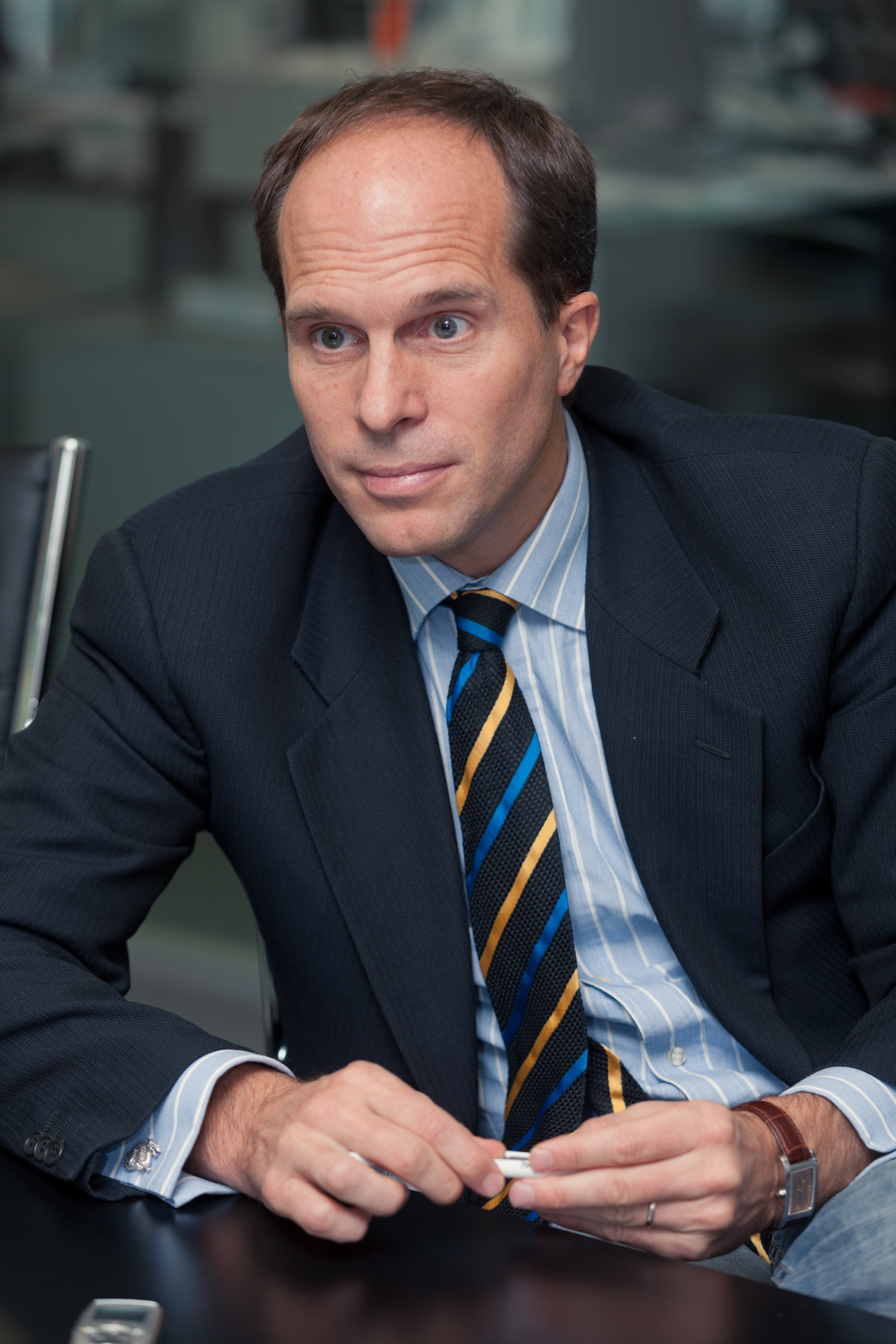
- Jochen Wermuth
- Born: December 13, 1969 (age 56); Boston, Massachusetts, USA
- Education: Brown University
- Occupations: Founder and CIO Wermuth Asset Management
- Website: www.jochenwermuth.de

Jochen Wermuth (born 13 December 1969) is a German climate impact investor, He is the founder and Chief Investment Officer of Wermuth Asset Management, a German family office and investment advisory firm committed to sustainable investments. From 2017 until 2024 he was a member of the investment committee for the German Nuclear Waste Management Funds KENFO.

== Biography ==
Jochen Wermuth was born in Boston, Massachusetts, where his parents Dr. Dieter Wermuth and Professor Dr. Nanny Ellen Wermuth were studying on Fulbright scholarships at Tufts and Harvard University, respectively.

He is the eldest of their four sons, Martin (1974), Peter (1976) and Ulli (1981). Jochen graduated magna cum laude and with honours from Brown University, and holds a BA in Mathematics and Economics and MA in Economics. He also passed his qualifying exams for a Doctorate in Economics at Balliol College, Oxford. With Russian ecologist Alexandra Kornilova they have three children, Niklas (2005), Alina (2008), Kristina (2012).

In 1993, Jochen Wermuth became an EU-TACIS adviser to Russia's Ministry of Finance in the area of "fiscal policy framework development" based on his studies of the transformations following German unification. He co-founded the World Bank sponsored Economic Expert Group under the Ministry of Finance of Russia and headed it between 1995 and 1997. In 1997, he joined Deutsche Bank's Global Markets Division in London as Director of Russian debt capital markets origination, working from Moscow as a member of the management committee responsible for setting up Deutsche's fully licensed subsidiary there. While working for Deutsche Bank, from 1997 to 1998, Jochen Wermuth and his team raised around $8 billion in financing for Russia. He left Deutsche Bank with an outstanding bonus claim for $37m an issue which was eventually settled amicably out of court.

In 1999, Jochen Wermuth became the Founding Partner and Chief Investment Officer of Wermuth Asset Management GmbH, a family office and investment advisor.

He is a member of the board of the Liberal Mission Foundation and a supporter of Greenpeace.

In March 2016 Jochen Wermuth made a Euro 300,000 donation to the German green political party Alliance ´90/The Greens (German: Bündnis 90/Die Grünen) to support their election campaign in Baden-Wuerttemberg, where state elections were held on 13 March 2016. He argued that he made this donation because the Greens in Baden-Wuerttemberg were both supportive of the refugee policy of Chancellor Merkel, but also because the party had proven that a sustainable economic policy could generate both high growth and many jobs. He further said that out of all the German parties only the Greens seemed to have a clear policy focus on the completion of the energy transition to 100 percent renewable power and the transport transition to 100 percent renewable transport as required for Germany to continue to be a leading industrial nation in the future. Indeed, at the elections the Greens became the largest party in a German state for the first time.

The Greens, which had called for caps at Euro 100,000 on individual donations, were criticized for accepting the donation. But Winfried Kretschmann, the Minister-President of Baden-Wuerttemberg, said: The law is not in place yet and it would be silly to not accept this donation. The German newspaper Die Tageszeitung (taz) argued that while it may happen to be a sympathetic cause for someone to make a donation to support green causes, what if someone had provided a 30 percent boost to the election campaign budget for some party promoting coal production? To the taz, the Greens had lost their most important asset, their credibility, by accepting the donation.

Wermuth was suspected by German news magazine Der Spiegel for having donated because one of his portfolio companies, Aquarion had many employees in the region and another portfolio company, The Mobility House could potentially benefit from a further development of electric mobility in Baden-Wuerttemberg. Wermuth replied that he would never seek for contracts for his portfolio companies, but that indeed his portfolio companies could profit from the energy and transport transition.

He advised the Russian government on the transition to a market economy during the immediate post-Soviet period, and has been a frequent commentator in the media on Russian economic matters.

== Public profile ==
Jochen Wermuth played a major role in the Dutch TV documentary "The breakthrough in renewable energies" a VPRO backlight documentary aired on national TV in various countries and published on VPRO's YouTube Channel on 6 May 2016. It argues that: "It’s not in the papers but a silent revolution is moving across the world. Renewable energy is becoming cheaper than from fossil fuels. It means that progressively the choice for wind and solar energy is no longer an ethical one but an economic one. And this will speed up the transfer to renewable energy."

On the 19th of June 2017, Jochen Wermuth was appointed as an investment committee member of the newly established Fund for the Financing of Nuclear Waste Management (Fonds zur Finanzierung der kerntechnischen Entsorgung). The Fund’s first and foremost task is to raise funds of approximately EUR 24 bn from the operators of nuclear power plants in Germany in early July 2017.

In December 2016, Jochen Wermuth’s Wermuth Asset Management presented Pope Francis with a new Nissan Leaf electric car as a gift for his 80th birthday. The firm has also made a commitment to prepare four studies that will enable the nation-state of the Vatican to become emissions-free running entirely on renewables.

In 2017 he has made comment in the publication Christian Today with an article titled: “Why Christians cannot afford to bury their talents in the fight against climate change”. The commentary discusses climate change and the impact monetary investments can have in reducing its adverse effects while also reflecting positively on one’s wealth.

Jochen’s stance favoring the advancement of the Green Industrial Revolution has led him to voice his opinions (Die Zeit, November 2016) regarding the positive role that Germany can play in the green energy transition, and the economic benefit that can be realized as a result of the country’s participation.

In 2020 he appeared in the movie “Schmutzige Geschäfte mit unserer Rente”, where he presented Nexwafe, a German solar wafer manufacturer. The film shows how big pension funds and insurers are greenwashing with private pension money.

== History ==
=== First to warn of potential Russian default ===
Yevgeny Yasin, ex-Minister of Economics wrote in his article in a book about Russian economic reforms that Jochen Wermuth, head of the Economic Expert Group under the Ministry of Finance of the Russian Federation, was the first to warn of a potential default of the Russian Government in a memo in the fall of 1996 which he forwarded to Chernomyrdin.

=== Questions to the Russian authorities on corruption and investment climate ===
In summer 2010, Jochen Wermuth, together with Nikita Suslov published an article "How to improve Russia's Investment Climate". In the fall of 2011, ahead of the Russian Duma elections and the general public uproar, Jochen Wermuth challenged President Vladimir Putin on the progress made in terms of fighting corruption and in terms of improving the Russian business climate at the VTB conference.

Jochen Wermuth has been in 2011 a regular commentator on russian politics.

== Commitment to sustainable growth ==
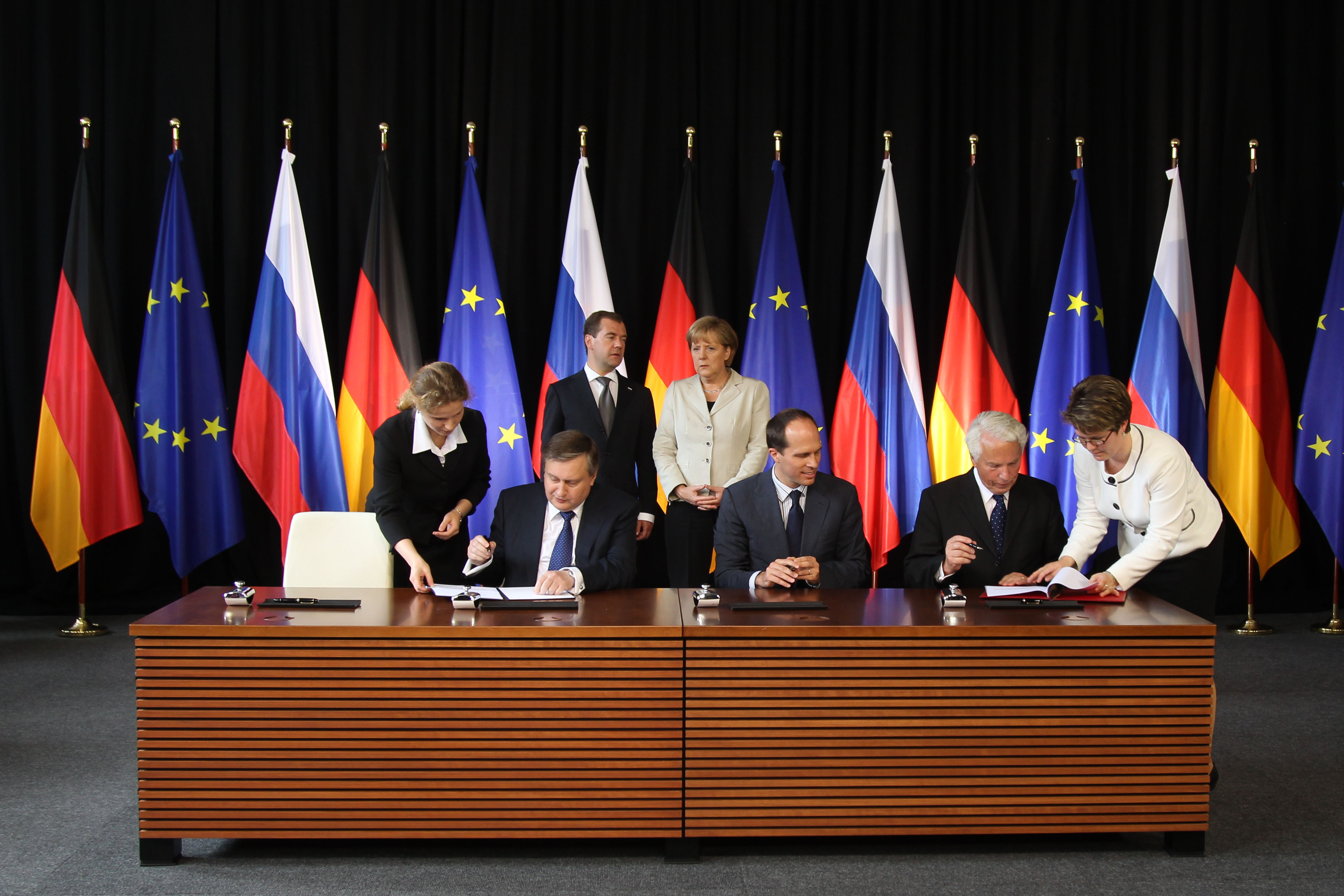
Jochen Wermuth at the signing ceremony dedicated to the launch of the resource efficiency fund Green Gateway Fund

Jochen Wermuth is a sponsor of Greenpeace since 1992, a member of "Eurosolar" since 2000 and did his first investments into clean tech in 2000, starting with an integrated production chain from quartz sands to mono-silicon with the late Nobel Prize Laureate Alexander Prokhorov. He found that he required a stronger balance sheet to see through such important break-through technologies, turned his family office into an investment advisory business and gradually built the team and assets dedicated to investments in sustainable growth, culminating in the "Green Gateway Fund" dedicated to investing in leading EU clean tech companies with technologies relevant to the Russian-Kazakhstan-Belarusian Free Trade zone to which entry to such a market via Russia's region of Tatarstan might be attractive.

== Wermuth Asset Management ==
After leaving Deutsche Bank, Wermuth founded his own family office focusing on sustainable investments, Russia and the CIS. Wermuth Asset Management (WAM) is an international investment advisory firm headquartered in Germany. The firm's main clients are investments funds it sponsors, which in turn have high-net-worth individuals, family offices, fund of funds, pension funds as investors. WAM advises funds in several alternative asset classes, including long/short equities activist value investing, real estate development and private equity, with a focus on sustainable growth and clean-technology funds spanning the EU and Russia, which make up 60% of AUM. Among others, WAM invests in the solar manufacturer Nexwafe via the Green Growth Fund 2. Nexwafe produces energy- and material-saving wafers that also bring a significant cost advantage. WAM has been a member of the World Economic Forum's "Champions of Tomorrow" and the G20 Green Growth Action Alliance (G2A2) initiatives and a sponsor of Transparency International and of the "Deutsch-Russische Jugendaustausch" (German Russian Youth Exchange).

== Other engagements ==
Furthermore, Jochen Wermuth was between 2017 and 2024 an investment advisory committee member of KENFO, Germany’s Nuclear Waste Management Fund and a member of Toniic’s "100% impact" Family Office Network that is committed to invest across all asset classes with market returns and a positive impact.

In the period leading up to the German parliamentary elections in 2021, he supports GermanZero, a German climate protection organization that advocates a 1.5-degree legislative package and climate neutrality in Germany by 2035.

== Other interests ==
Wermuth is a member of the board of curators of the Friends and Supporters of the Berlin State Opera, a member of the Young President's Organization and is its inaugural spokesperson for the YPO Global Pulse, a member of Eurosolar founded by Hermann Scheer, a member of The Liberal Mission of Russia, the German Association for Foreign Policy (DGAP), and a supporter of Greenpeace. His philanthropic activity includes support of renewable energy research at Brown University, support of the New Economics School in Moscow, to Russian orphanages and efforts to protect the grave of artist Kazimir Malevich. He is a runner, swimmer and cyclist and used to ballroom dance, play tennis and soccer.
