= Francis D. Wormuth =

American lawyer

Francis Dunham Wormuth (1909 – 1980) was an American lawyer and teacher, having been a Distinguished Professor at the University of Utah. Among many other writings, Wormuth wrote a notable assessment of the Vietnam War based upon a legal critique of the use (or misuse) of congressional war powers.

== Selected works ==
- Wormuth, Francis D. (1949). The Origins of Modern Constitutionalism. New York: Harper and Brothers, Publishers.
