= Rut Wermuth =

Polish survivor of the Nazi Holocaust (1928–2021)

Wermuth, Rut
- Born: 1 January 1928; Kołomyja, Stanisławów Voivodeship, Poland
- Died: 24 April 2021 (aged 93); Lubawka, Poland
- Other names: Burak, Rut
- Known for: Memoirist, Polish Holocaust survivor
- Awards: David Ben Gurion Centenary Grand Prize

–

Rut Wermuth-Burak (1 January 1928 – 24 April 2021) was a Polish survivor of the Nazi Holocaust, whose life story was published in Polish as "Spotkałam Ludzi" ("Encounters with the Decent") in 2002, and in English as "Leap for Life" in 2010.

== Early life ==
Rut Wermuth was born on 1 January 1928 in the small town of Kołomyja, Stanislawowskie, in eastern Poland. She was born to Jewish parents who ran a delicatessen in the center of the town, and kept a comfortable middle-class household. Rut had two older brothers- Pawel and Israel (nicknamed Salek). Though Rut's formal education was interrupted by the Soviet invasion of Poland in 1939 and the German invasion of Poland in 1941, the books that her brothers provided inspired a lifelong love of reading, and later influenced her career path.

== Fugitive ==
In 1941, when she was just 13 years old, the German occupiers moved the family first to the local ghetto, and then herded them onto a cattle train bound for the death camp of Belzec. Her two brothers had earlier been separated from the family; Pawel had been executed by the Germans in the Szeparowce forest while Salek had fled the German invasion, following the retreating Russians. Rut and her parents managed to escape the death train through a hole in the side of their cattle compartment, but during the course of their escape her father was killed.

Her mother subsequently managed to assume a false identity to get a position as a maid in a local Manor House, but was unable to keep Rut since she had no papers. Rut decided to assume a false identity and go to the last place the Nazis would think of looking for her: to volunteer for work inside Germany.

Rut survived for the rest of the war working in various positions in western Germany; at a shoe factory, in the household of a well connected German, and at the BMW plant in Allach (near Munich). It was at this final assignment that she met her future husband,- another Pole named Witek Burak.

== Personal life ==
Rut struggled with whether to reveal her true identity to the Polish man who had shown kindness to her in Germany. However Witek was very supportive and continued to request her hand in marriage, not disturbed by her Jewish background. After the war they returned to their native Poland and were assigned accommodation in a small town in Lower Silesia. Witek worked as an engineer at a local spinning mill, and after completing her education Rut managed a bookshop. They had two daughters: Kristina and Wiesia.

Rut Wermuth died on 24 April 2021, at the age of 93.

== Reunion ==
Wermuth found out during the war that her mother had died – possibly from illness but probably because she was discovered by the German occupiers in Poland. After the war, she searched for the only remaining member of her family who might still be alive, her older brother Salek. Her search was complicated by the fact that she did not remember his full name, or birth date.

Through a series of meetings and correspondence with friends in New York and Israel, she discovered that Salek had also survived the war, and gone on to be a respected journalist and commentator. Like Rut, he had taken an assumed name during the war, Victor Zorza, and had settled in England, where he wrote for The Guardian newspaper, and was famous for having an uncanny understanding of the inner workings of the Kremlin. In 1994 after 53 years apart, they were reunited, first over the telephone, and then as Rut visited Victor in England.

== Author ==
Wermuth wrote her memoirs, and in September 1999, the Polish version of "Spotkałam ludzi" ("Encounters with the Decent") won the David Ben Gurion Centenary Grand Prize. (Note: Rut's remarks at the award ceremony are available here.) The memoirs were also published in German in 2006, and Wermuth has spoken to many schoolchildren in Germany and Poland about her experiences.

An English translation of the book under the title Leap for Life was published in 2010.

== Bibliography ==
- Wermuth, Rut (1998). Spotkałam Ludzi. Media Rodzina. ISBN 83-7278-057-9.
- Wermuth, Rut (2010). Leap for Life. ELSP. ISBN 978-1-906641-19-1.
