= Dzhebel Municipality =

Dzhebel Municipality Община Джебел
- Municipality
- Location within Bulgaria
- Coordinates: 41°30′N 25°18′E
- Country: Bulgaria
- Province: Kardzhali
- Municipality: Dzhebel

Area
  - Total: 229.08 km^{2} (88.45 sq mi)

Population (2021)
  - Total: 8,375
  - Density: 36.56/km^{2} (94.69/sq mi)
- Time zone: UTC+2 (EET)
  - Summer (DST): UTC+3 (EEST)
- Website: www.dzhebelbg.com

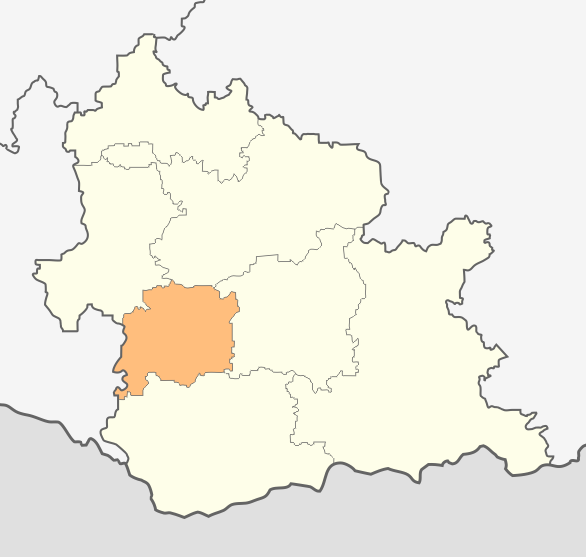
Dzhebel municipality within Kardzhali Province

Dzhebel Municipality is a municipality in Kardzhali Province, Bulgaria. It includes the town of Dzhebel, which is the administrative center of a municipality, and a number of villages.

== Demography ==
In recent years, the number of births decreased dramatically. The number of deaths increased in the beginning of the 2000s and remained fairly stable after. That led to a natural negative growth rate. However, the demographic situation is Dzhebel is more favourable compared to other areas in Bulgaria.

	Population	Live births	Deaths	Natural growth	Birth rate (‰ per 1,000)	Death rate (‰ per 1,000)	Natural growth rate (‰)
2000	11,038	78	76	+2	7.1	6.9	+0.2
2001	8,613	105	121	-16	12.2	14.0	-1.9
2002	8,571	68	63	+5	7.9	7.4	+0.6
2003	8,568	80	80	0	9.3	9.3	+0.0
2004	8,500	93	86	+7	10.9	10.1	+0.8
2005	8,427	85	94	-9	10.1	11.2	-1.1
2006	8,388	74	93	-19	8.8	11.1	-2.3
2007	8,384	91	97	-6	10.9	11.6	-0.7
2008	8,348	99	96	+3	11.9	11.5	+0.4
2009	8,295	93	77	+16	11.2	9.3	+1.9
2010	8,201	87	79	+8	10.6	9.6	+1.0
2011	8,166	69	75	-6	8.4	9.2	-0.7
2012	8,160	70	68	+2	8.6	8.3	+0.2
2013	8,163	91	82	+9	11.1	10.0	+1.1
2014	8,248	83	96	-13	10.1	11.6	-1.5
2015	8,205	79	102	-23	9.6	12.4	-2.8
2016	8,226	79	93	-14	9.6	11.3	-1.7
2017	8,253	63	91	-28	7.6	11.0	-3.4
2018	8,441	68	93	-25	8.1	11.0	-3.0
2021	8,375	47	133	-86	5.6	15.9	-10.3

=== Religion ===
According to the Bulgarian census of 2011, the religious composition, among those who answered the optional question on religious identification, was the following:

Religious composition of Dzhebel Municipality
Orthodox Christianity	3.6%
Catholicism	0.2%
Protestantism	0.0%
Islam	82.3%
No religion	1.0%
Prefer not to answer, others and indefinable	12.9%

According to the Bulgarian census of 2021, the religion demographics were as follows:

Religious composition of Dzhebel Municipality
Christianity	2.03%
Judaism	0.03%
Islam	72.44%
No religion	0.25%
Prefer not to answer, others and indefinable	25.24%
