= Mihail Leshtarski =

Bulgarian serial killer

- Born: Mihail Tsvetanov Leshtarski; March 19, 1959 (age 67); Tsarevets, Vratsa Province, People's Republic of Bulgaria
- Other names: "The Killer from the Cave" "The Caveman" "The Cave Killer"
- Conviction: Murder
- Penalty: Life imprisonment

Details
- Victims: 1–14+
- Span of crimes: 1999-2009 – 2011, possibly earlier
- Country: Bulgaria
- States: Sofia (convicted); Vratsa, Montana (suspected)
- Date apprehended: February 22, 2011
- Imprisoned at: Vratsa Central Prison

Mihail Tsvetanov Leshtarski (Bulgarian: Михаил Цветанов Лещарски; born March 19, 1959), known as The Killer from the Cave (Bulgarian: Убиецът от пещерата), is a Bulgarian thief, robber, murderer and suspected serial killer. He was sentenced to life imprisonment for the murder of 59-year-old Elena Tomova in Vlado Trichkov, and is suspected of murdering at least four other pensioners from 2009 to 2011.

== Biography ==
=== Early life ===
Mihail Leshtarski was born in 1959 in the village of Tsarevets as one of two children. His father Tsvetan was a wealthy shopkeeper, but a very aggressive and nervous man, while his mother was a housekeeper. Mihail Leshtarski was an unruly child, and in order to discipline him, his father would chain him to the family bed and put food just out of reach, starving his young son, with his mother never trying to protect or even interact at all with him. His father would even chain him to the family car and drive around the yard, and beat him with a motor cord until his skin turned blue. He studied up to the 8th grade, but didn't finish his education, and was continuously incarcerated for various robberies throughout the rest of his life, during some of which he was also abused and even gang raped by some of the inmates. In order to evade beatings by his father, the young Leshtarski would go out at night stealing and robbing people. Eventually, at 15 or 16 years old, he was called for mandatory service in the army, and began visiting the village only from time to time.

One day, Leshtarski had to return to his regiment following a short break, with his father offering to drive him and his mother to the nearby village in the family's newly bought Moskvitch. From there, Leshtarski would catch a train to Roman. However, shortly after they took off, his father, who had drunk heavily, got into a car crash. Although Leshtarski was unscathed, his father had had his legs broken and his mother suffered a heavy concussion, allegedly causing her mental health issues. According to Leshtarski, she would be in the kitchen cooking and when the cat would jump on the table, she would drag along the cat's fur before putting it back into the pot, and even burned down some of the family's sheep pens. His mother would eventually accuse him of raping her, for which Leshtarski was sentenced to 18 years imprisonment.

During his stay in prison, he was regularly visited by his brother, who'd often ask him for money to buy various house appliances. One of the women in the facility also taught Leshtarski how to do donations, in order to have his sentence reduced. Shortly after his incarceration, his mother suffered from a stroke and stopped talking. Leshtarski was described as an "excellent prisoner, bad citizen", and after 12 years behind bars, he was released in 2005. According to him, his father then told him that his mother had started talking again soon after seeing him.

After this, Leshtarski resumed with stealing and robbing rich people, being incarcerated and released at various times. He had bought off an underage Romani prostitute to have as a live-in girlfriend, but the girl later abandoned him, hurting him deeply. From 2005 to 2008, he worked in hotel complex "Chaika" in Vratsa as a worker. He was described as a good, hard-working employee, but one day, just after his probation period had ended, he went berserk, breaking all of the company cars' and trucks' windows before fleeing. Feeling that he couldn't fit into normal society, Leshtarski began living in caves around the mountain range, surviving by eating 3-4 spoonfuls of honey every day and hunting animals with a self-made bow, with some reports claiming that he had eaten live bats. He was also a skilled climber who scaled his way to most of his hideouts and even during his later confessions, he claimed that he could walk 30 kilometers to the seaside in the span of several days.

For a span of four months, he hid in the house of former cellmate Stoyan Mladenov in Dolna Kremena, threatening to kill the man and his family if they ratted him out. Leshtarski slept in their attic, making a hole in the walls to see what's going on downstairs. He'd disappear for 4–5 days, leaving his hideout by climbing out the roof. On one occasion, he attacked Mladenov with a stool, and even raped his wife.

=== Murder of Elena Tomova ===
On August 27, 2009, Elena Tomova, a 59-year-old woman who lived with her daughter and her husband in Sofia and often visited her renewed villa in Vlado Trichkov, noticed that somebody had been in her house and had slept in her bed. The woman even found a hunter's hat lying around, but none of the more expensive items were touched. Tomova contemplated calling the police, but decided that it's no use and abandoned the idea, instead wondering if she should remain in the villa or return to Sofia. As the villa was a bit farther away from other homes, Tomova had decided to get her axe and place it nearby. She then went off to collect wild berries, later asking her neighbor if she could stay at her house, but the latter denied, as she had visitors. Soon after, while trying to read a book, she heard somebody open the wooden gate. That somebody turned out to be Leshtarski – scruffy, with a long, graying and bushy beard.

The day before, Leshtarski had boarded a train from Mezdra to Sofia and landed in Vlado Trichkov, where he then proceeded to wander around the hillside, sleeping in abandoned houses without doors or windows before continuing to drift along. He eventually reached Tomova's house, entering through a broken window from the back side, and began looking for food and water. Leshtarski found and drank a bottle of gin, and then ate some canned mushrooms and cucumbers before deciding to leave. He then returned a few hours later to check if anybody was home, noticing that Tomova was there – a plump woman, 160 cm tall, blond hair, wearing a dress, a vest and some slippers.

After noticing him, he asked Tomova for some food, after which the good-natured woman gave him two slices of bread. Leshtarski confessed that he intended to sleep in the house, before asking to make himself an omelette, to which Tomova agreed. While he was baking the eggs, Tomova phoned her daughter Zornitsa, telling her that there was a man in the house and that her father was sleeping in the adjoining room (which was a lie, as she had been divorced for 10 years, and visited the villa alone). After offering Leshtarski to go outside for a smoke, the two returned to the room, where Tomova, who was a Jehovah's witness, started lecturing him about the Bible and God. Upon hearing this, Leshtarski got agitated, telling her that she reminded him of his mother.

The two got into a quarrel, with the enraged Leshtarski pushing Tomova off her chair. Tomova had grabbed the axe and tried to defend herself, but she was overwhelmed. Leshtarski then pushed her onto the bed, intending to rape her while choking Tomova with his hands. When he let her go, she did not move anymore. Supposedly, Leshtarski then sat on the bed and started crying, and after some time, he lowered his victim's clothes to her spine, before taking a knife and carving a cross on her forehead. He then took a metal spatula and severed her left breast, leaving it under the bed, put the sheets and the Bible over the deceased, grabbed the bottle of gin and left.

On August 28, her daughter Zornitsa rang on Tomova's telephone, but nobody answered. She called her mother several times and on the following day, along with her husband and son, traveled to the villa. The husband found the corpse and immediately called the police. The police conducted a search on the entire area, checking twice, but after months, the investigation into Tomova's death was called off.

== Capture, trial and sentence ==
The investigators worked on the case for two years, examining witness testimonies, pictures and the victim's background. They determined that the killer would be over 35, male, Bulgarian, with a basic education, with no permanent job, without a family. He would also be knowledgeable of the area, sexually immature, have a hatred towards women due to a tragic past, unable to have a social or sexual contact with the opposite sex. That profile fitted Leshtarski near perfectly.

On February 22, 2011, Mihail Leshtarski was captured in a cave near Mezdra on suspicion of committing robberies and taken to the court, where he readily confessed to murdering Tomova, but later recanted his confession, claiming he was mistreated by the police and that he wasn't hiding from them due to killing Tomova, and that he was instead doing because he was filmed by a camera stealing heroin from a rich woman. Nevertheless, on September 29, 2011, he was given two life sentences by the court, and is currently serving in Sofia Central Prison.

== Suspected murders ==
Leshtarski is suspected by authorities to have committed at least four other murders in the Vratsa and Montana provinces. Although no details about the latter murders are available, the former suspected murders are that of Yordan Yolov and Vladimir Toshovski. The 82-year-old and half-blind Yolov was beaten to death at his home in Staro Selo in January 2011, not far from where Leshtarski was hiding after killing Tomova, after which he was robbed. The following month, the 75-year-old Toshovski was also robbed at his home in Gorna Kremena, and when he only tried to give half of his pension to the killer, he was also beaten to death in a rage.

Aside from these, another similar murder that occurred in the capital is also thought to be Leshtarski's doing: the July 2007 killing of 59-year-old Mariana Dandova, who was also found strangled and with her breast cut off by a knife. Her body was found in a place frequented by a lot of prostitutes, but there were no witnesses to the crime. It was initially thought that, due to wild dogs having torn apart the rest of the corpse, she had been attacked by the rabid beings, but it was later determined that this was not the case. Leshtarski might have also had a motive here – the woman resembled the prostitute which had abandoned him years ago.

There is also a possibility for even more murders, as murders of elderly people have been reported around the country. The fact that while searching through his cave police found 12 pairs of glasses, possibly means that for the period that he was hiding out in the mountain range and travelled to the seaside, Leshtarski might have murdered more people living in remote villages.

== Aftermath ==
Leshtarski continues to deny any of the murders attributed to him, claiming that the police have framed him and that the real killer is out there. He has taken a huge dislike to his portrayal in the media, and in 2016, he claimed that when he gets out, he'd skin alive at least five people.

In 2020, during an interview with psychologist Todor Todorov recorded on the Bulgarian show No Man's Land, Leshtarski admitted to two further murders: his very first killing, which occurred in his native Tsarevets in 1999, when he got drunk and beat to death a female neighbor without any reason; he also confessed to killing a midwife whose death was erroneously attributed to heart problems, but refused to divulge the date or location of the crime. In response to his claims, prosecutors have indicated that they would investigate the claims and bring new charges if enough evidence is gathered.

== See also ==
- List of serial killers by country
