= Hisarya Municipality =

Coordinates: 42°30′N 24°42′E

Hisarya Municipality Община Хисаря
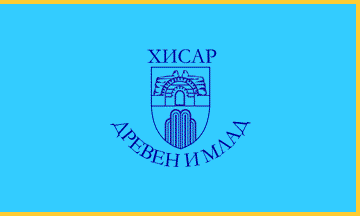
- Flag

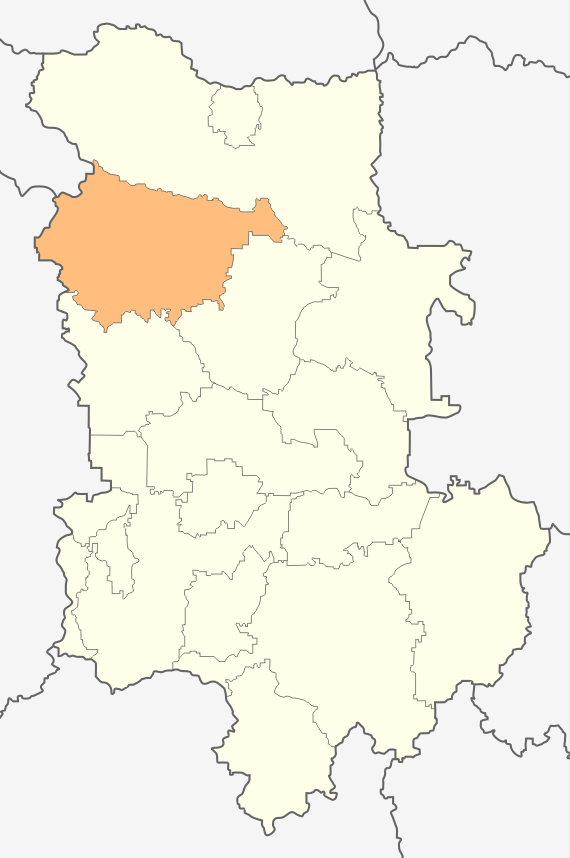
- Country: Bulgaria
- Province: Plovdiv Province
- Seat: Hisarya

Area
  - Total: 549.6 km^{2} (212.2 sq mi)

Population (2024)
  - Total: 9,952
  - Density: 18.11/km^{2} (46.90/sq mi)
- Website: hisarya.bg

Hisarya Municipality (Bulgarian: Община Хисаря) is a municipality in Plovdiv Province, central Bulgaria. Covering a territory of 549.6 km^{2}, it is the third largest of the 18 municipalities in the province, encompassing 9.17% of its total area. It borders the municipalities of Karlovo to the north, Kaloyanovo to the southeast, Saedinenie to the south, Strelcha to the west, and Koprivshtitsa to the northwest, the latter two in Pazardzhik Province and Sofia Province respectively. The municipal center is a major spa resort and contains extensive remains of the ancient Roman city Diocletianopolis.

== Geography ==
The relieve of the municipality is varied. The southern part lies within the northern reaches of the Upper Thracian Plain with an altitude between 300 m and 450 m. In its southernmost area is the municipality’s lowest altitude at 254 m. The central and northern zone is occupied by the southern slopes of the Sredna Gora mountain range, whose main ridge forms the municipal boundary with Karlovo to the north, where the highest point of the municipality is located, the summit of Shiligarka (1,577 m).

Hisarya Municipality falls within the transitional continental climatic zone. It is drained by several left tributaries of the Maritsa in the Aegean Sea drainage. Along its easternmost boundary with Karlovo Municipality flows a 9 km section of the Stryama. About 2/3 of the territory is drained by the Pyasachnik, which springs from the Shiligarka summit. In the southern part of the municipality is the Pyasachnik Reservoir, one of the largest in Plovdiv Province.

== Transport ==
Hisarya Municipality is traversed by four roads of the national network with a total length of 69.4 km, including a 4.1 km section of the second class II-64 road Plovdiv–Karlovo, a 23.6 km stretch of the third class III-606 road, the first 20 km of the third class III-642 road, and the whole 21.7 km length of the third class III-6061 road.

In the southeastern part of its territory run the final 11 km of railway line No. 82.1 Dolna Mahala–Hisarya.

== Demography ==
The population is 9,952 as of 2024.

There are 11 villages and one town in Hisarya Municipality:

- Belovitsa
- Chernichevo
- Hisarya
- Krasnovo
- Krastevich
- Malo Krushevo
- Mihiltsi
- Matenitsa
- Novo Zhelezare
- Panicheri
- Staro Zhelezare
- Starosel

== Gallery ==
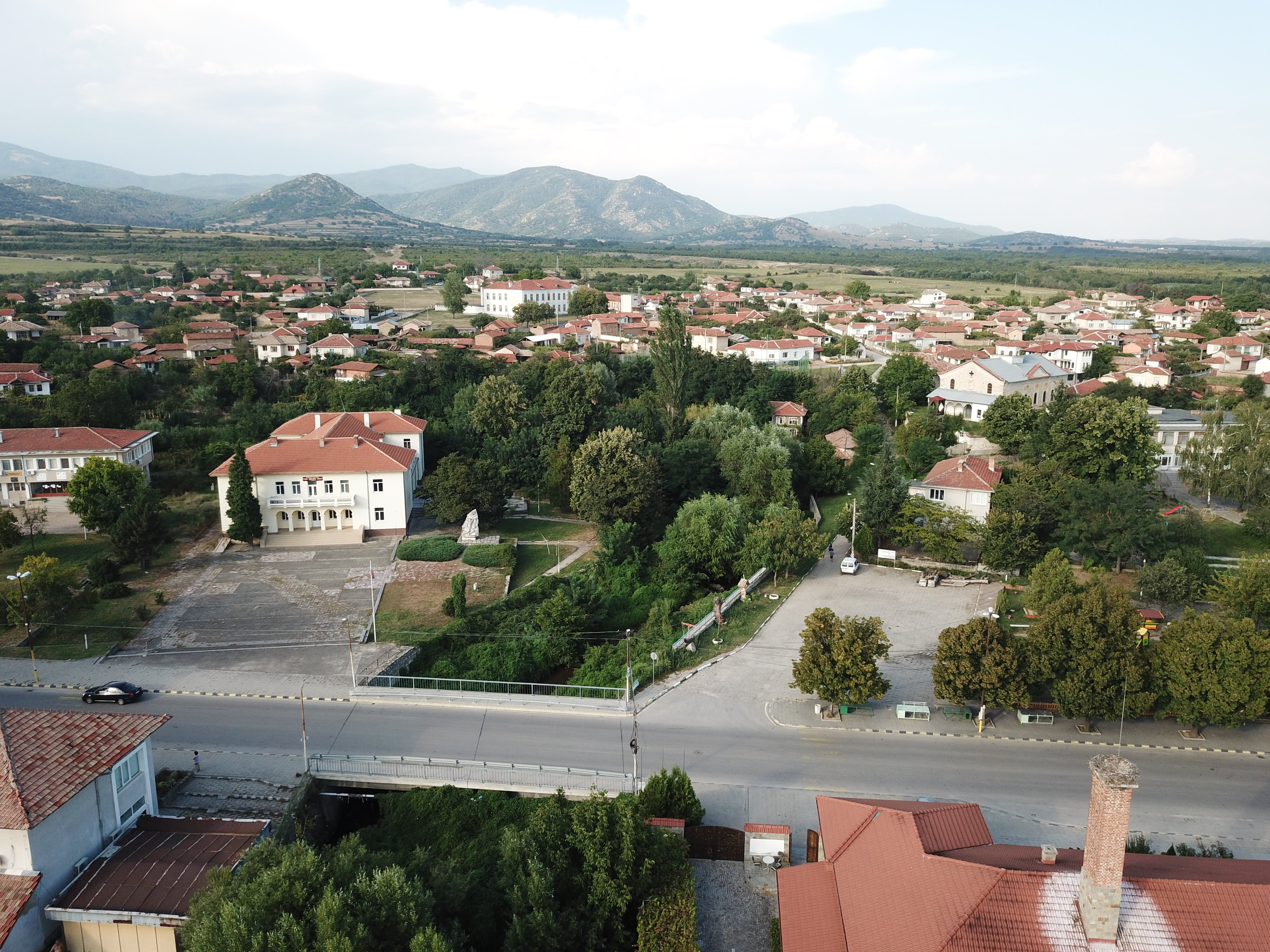
A view of Starosel

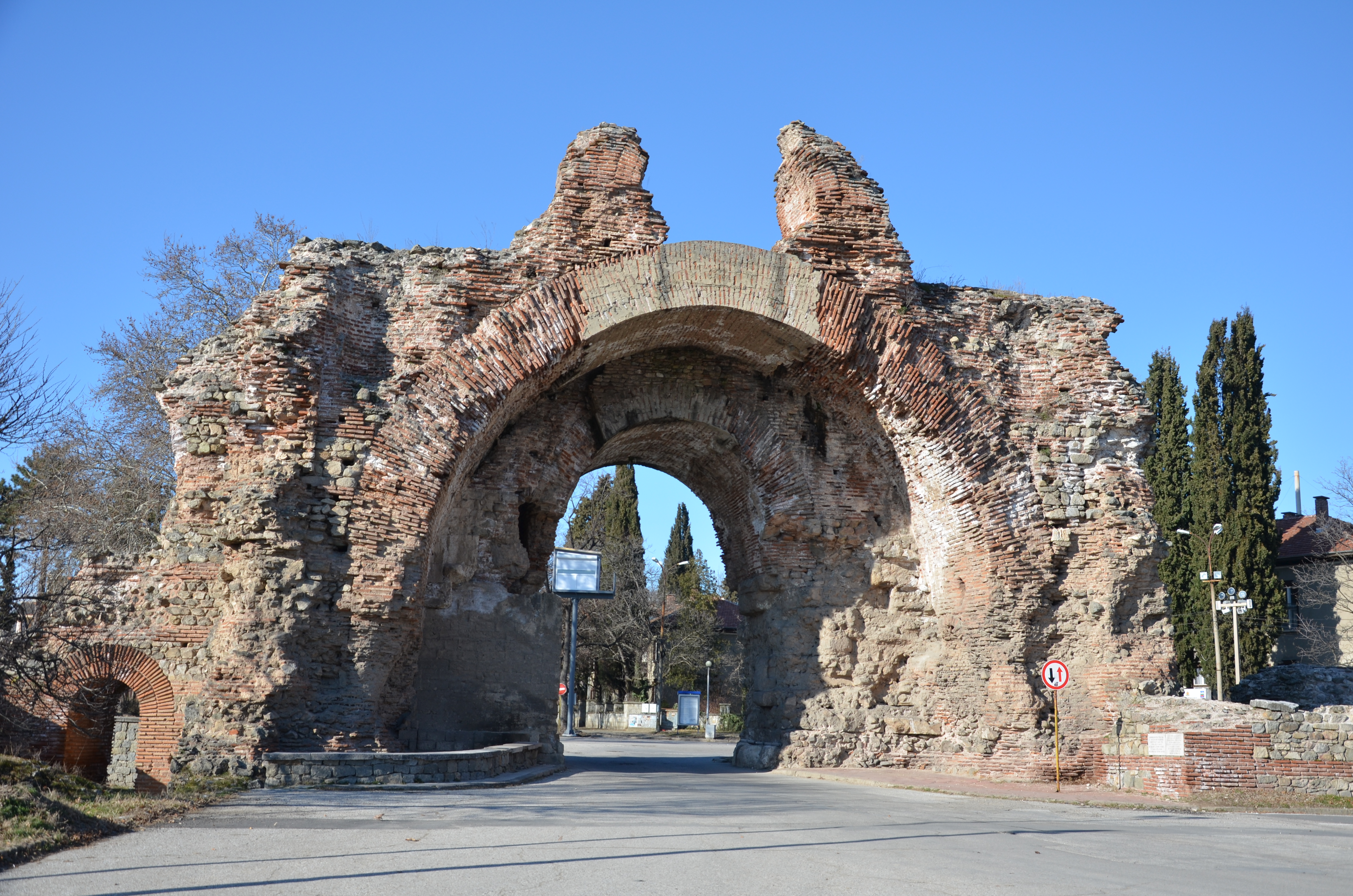
Roman walls of Hisarya

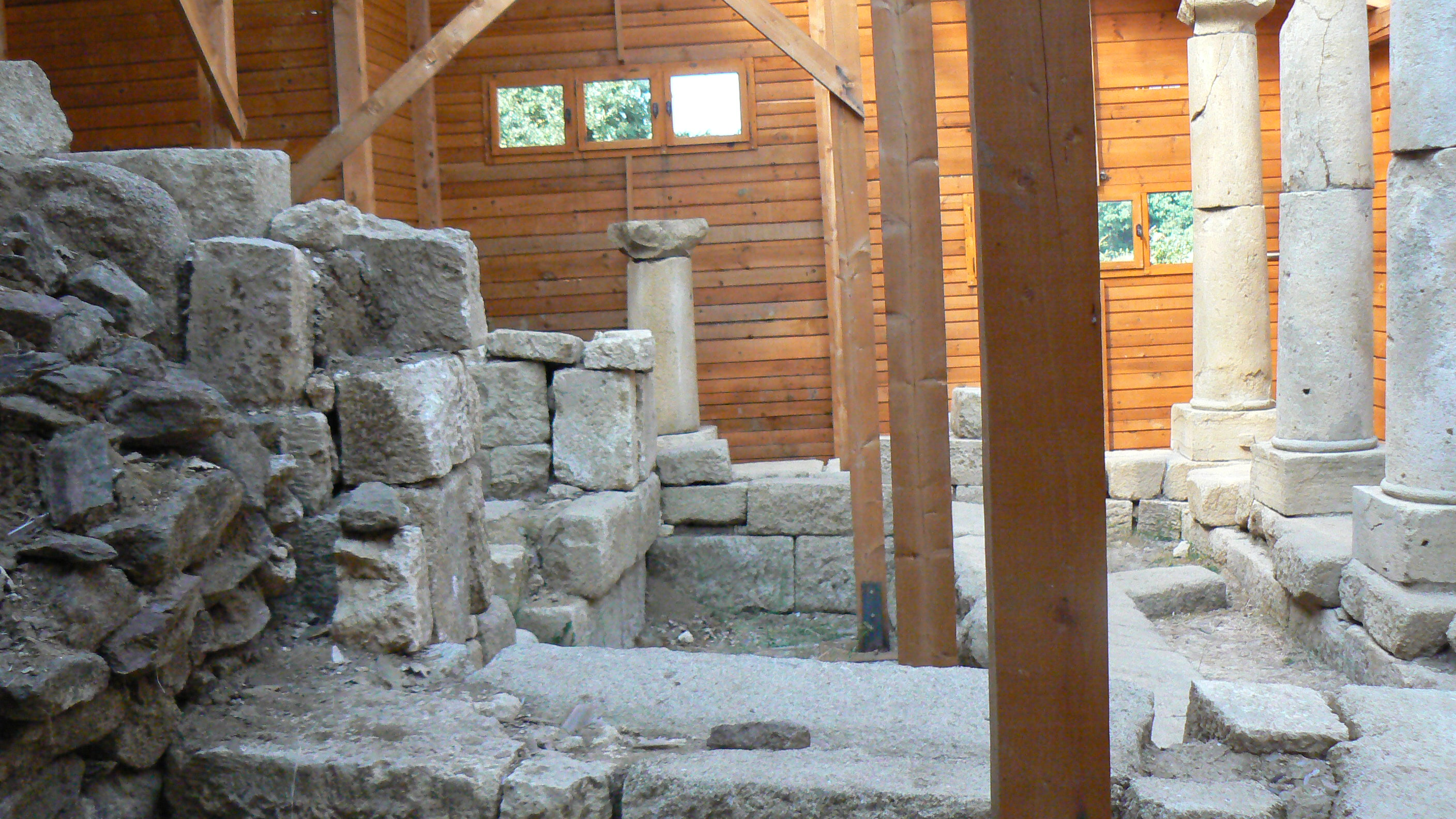
Thracian tumulus Horizont, Starosel

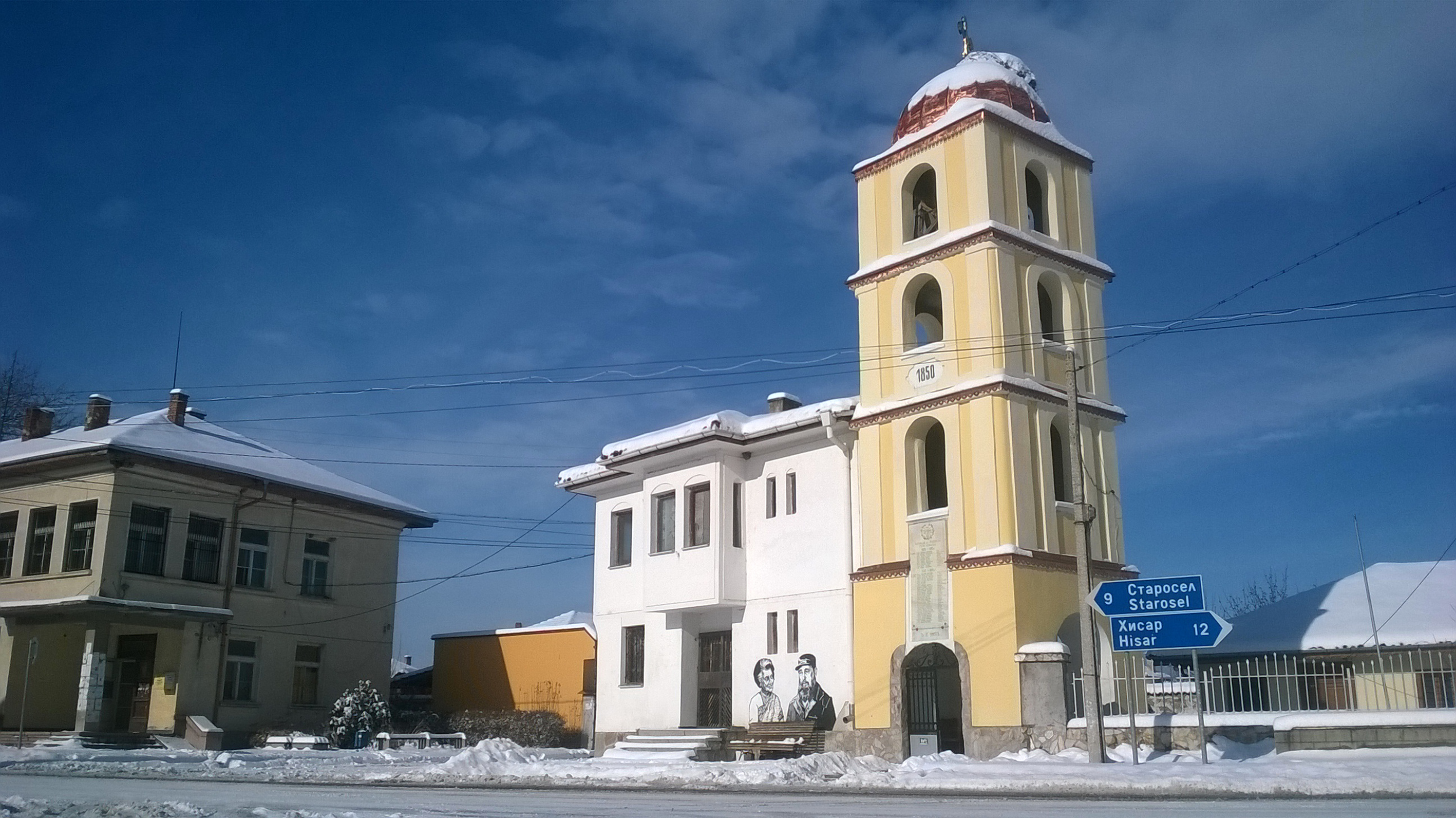
The church of Staro Zhelezare
