= Chernichevo =

Chernichevo may refer to the following places in Bulgaria:

- Chernichevo, Kardzhali Province
- Chernichevo, Plovdiv Province

== See also ==
- Chernicheno, Kursk Oblast, Russia
