= Staro Zhelezare =

Staro Zhelezare Старо Железаре
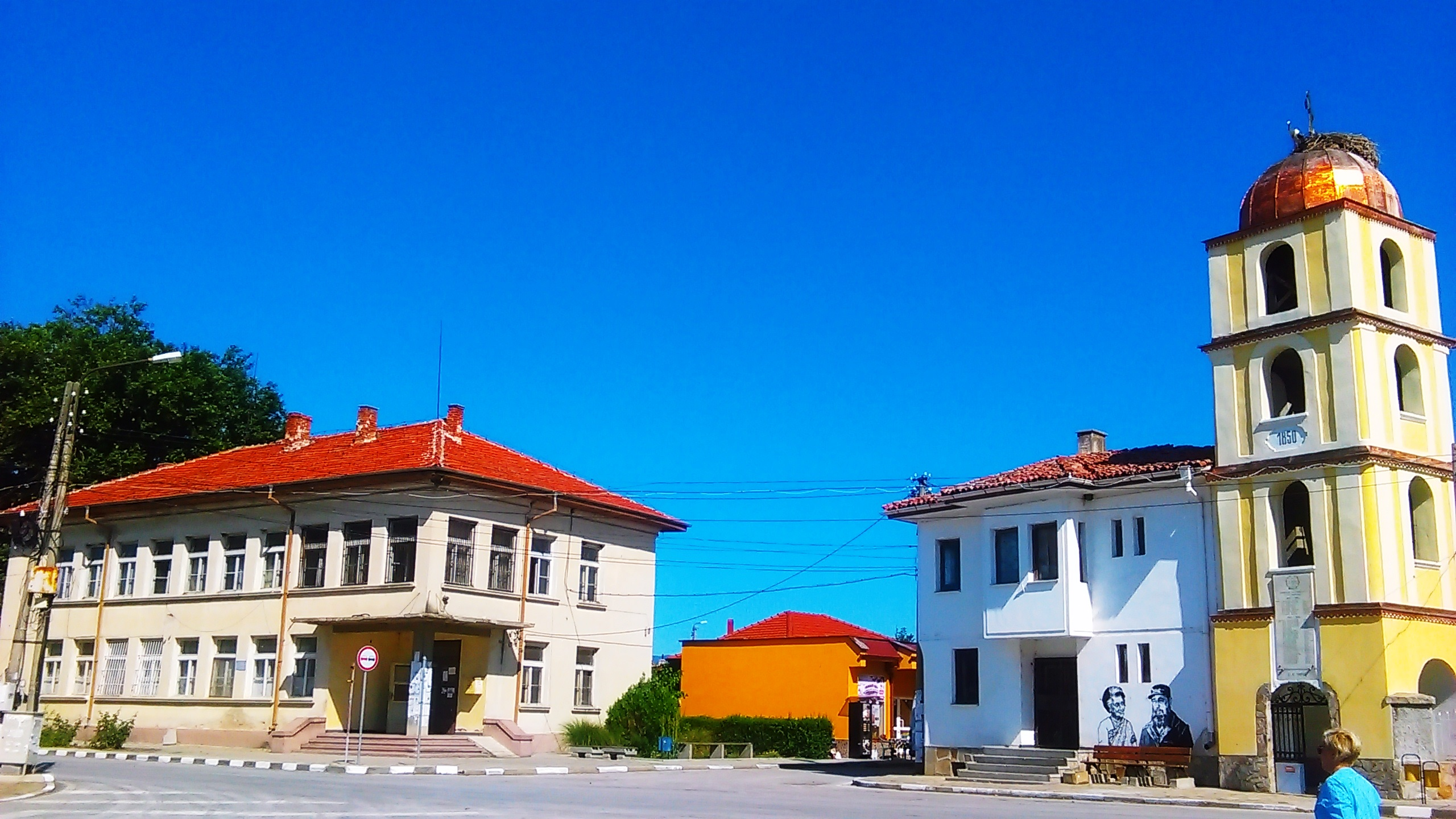

- Location of Staro Zhelezare, Bulgaria
- Coordinates: 42°26′32.5″N 24°39′3.41″E
- Country: Bulgaria
- Provinces (Oblast): Plovdiv Province

Government
  - Mayor: Iliya Tonov
- Elevation: 294 m (965 ft)

Population (15.09.2022)
  - Total: 401
- Time zone: UTC+2 (EET)
  - Summer (DST): UTC+3 (EEST)
- Postal Code: 4165
- Area codes: 03174 from Bulgaria, 003593174 from outside

Staro Zhelezare (Bulgarian: Старо Железаре) is a village in central Bulgaria. It has a population of 401 as of 2022.

== Geography ==
Staro Zhelezare is located in Plovdiv Province and has a territory of 34.209 km^{2}. It is part of Hisarya Municipality and lies some 5 km southwest of the municipal center Hisarya. It has direct road connections with the neighbouring villages of Panicheri to the northwest, Chernichevo to the east and Novo Zhelezare to the south.

Staro Zhelezare is situated in the Upper Thracian Plain, at the southern foothills of the Sredna Gora mountain range.

== History ==
A representative of the village participated as a deputy at the 1876 assembly in the Oborishte locality near Panagyurishte, considered as a precursor of the Bulgarian National Assembly, during which a decision was taken to begin the April Uprising against the Ottoman Empire. Numerous people from Staro Zhelezare fought in the Bulgarian Army during the First and the Second Balkan Wars, World War I and World War II. There is a monument dedicated to the fallen soldiers in the wars for the unification of Bulgaria.

== Economy ==
The village is situated in a rich agricultural region. The main crops include orchards, vegetables and grapes. Animal husbandry is also well-developed, mainly cattle, sheep and chicken.

== Gallery ==
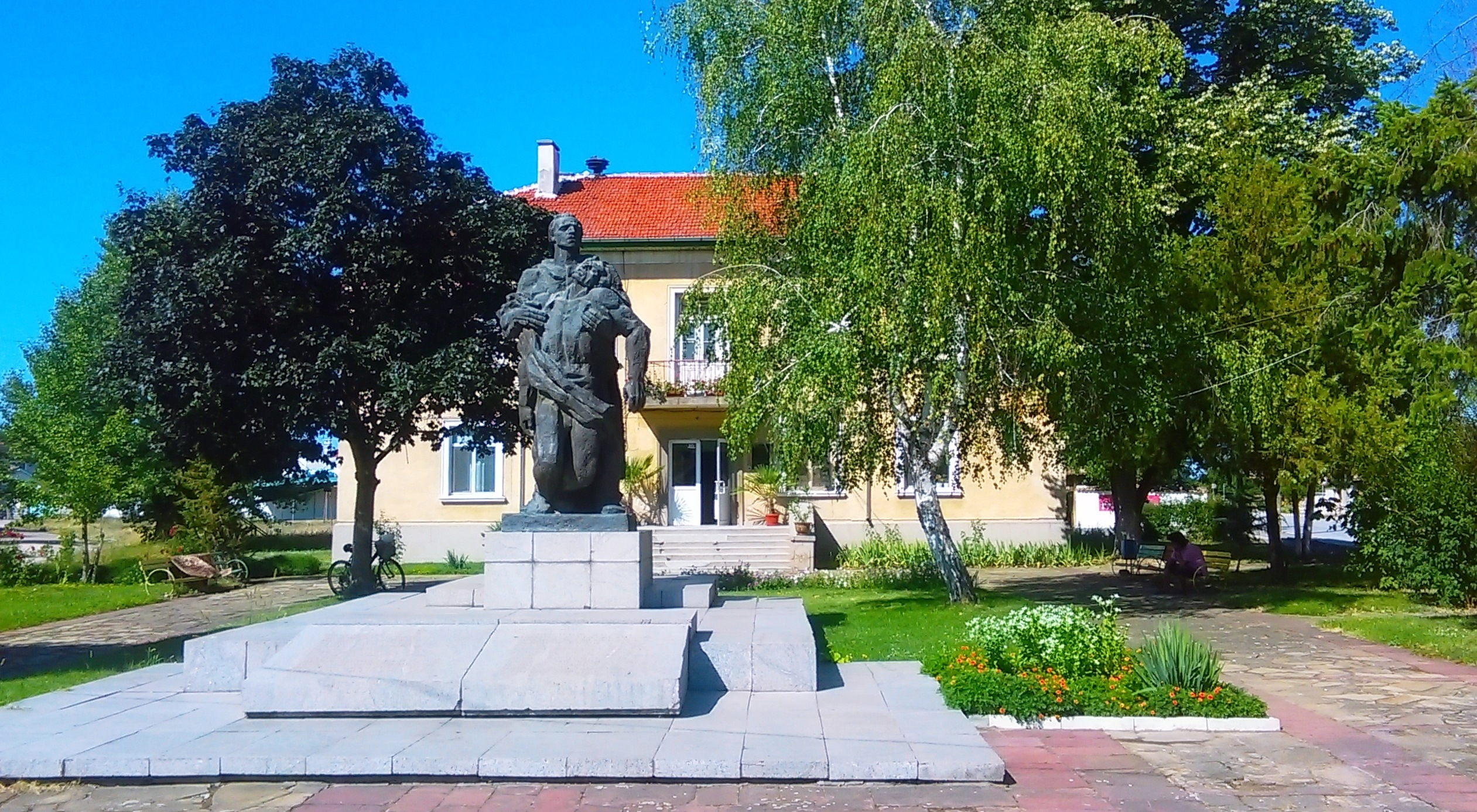
The Village Hall

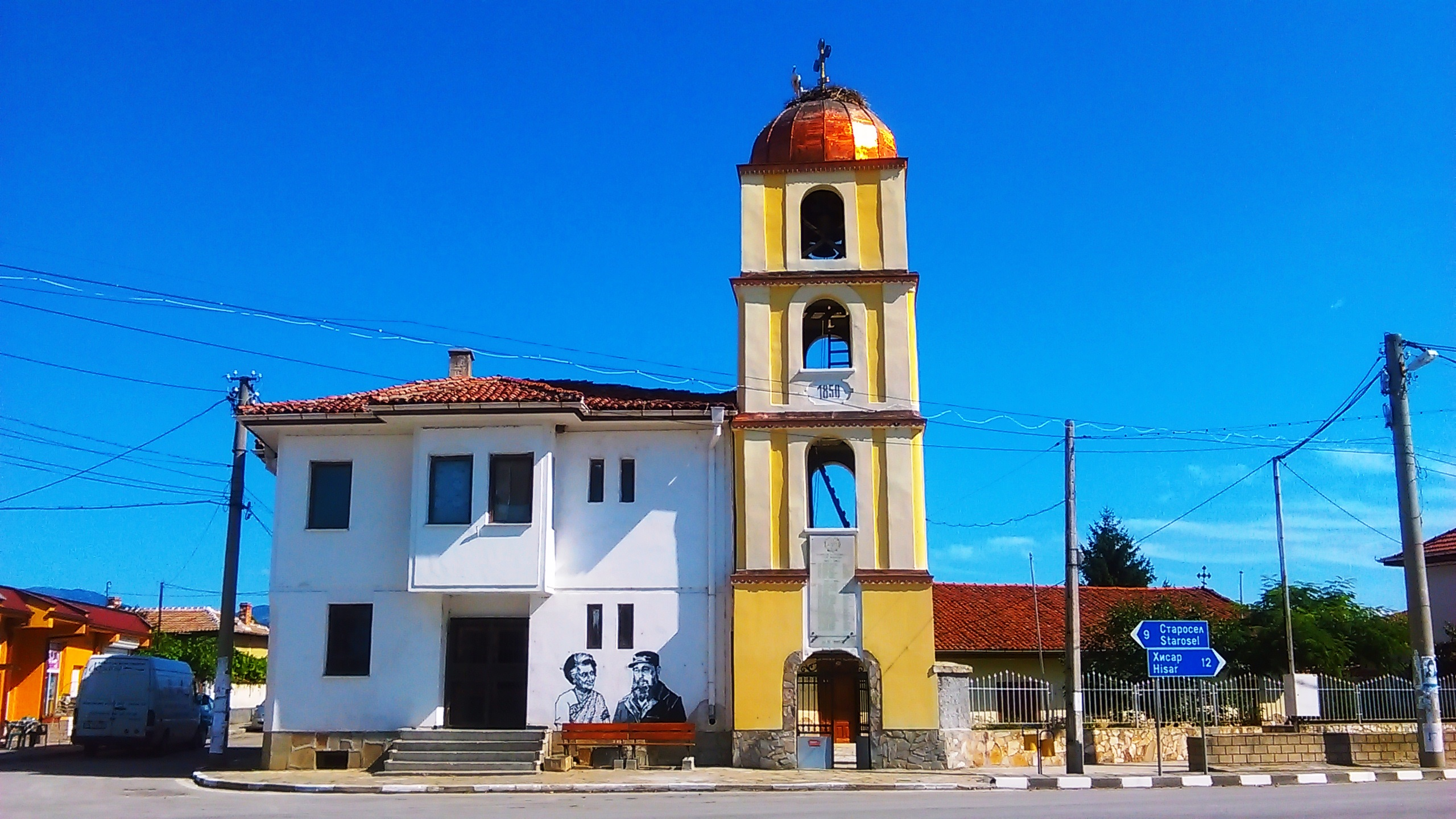
The belfry

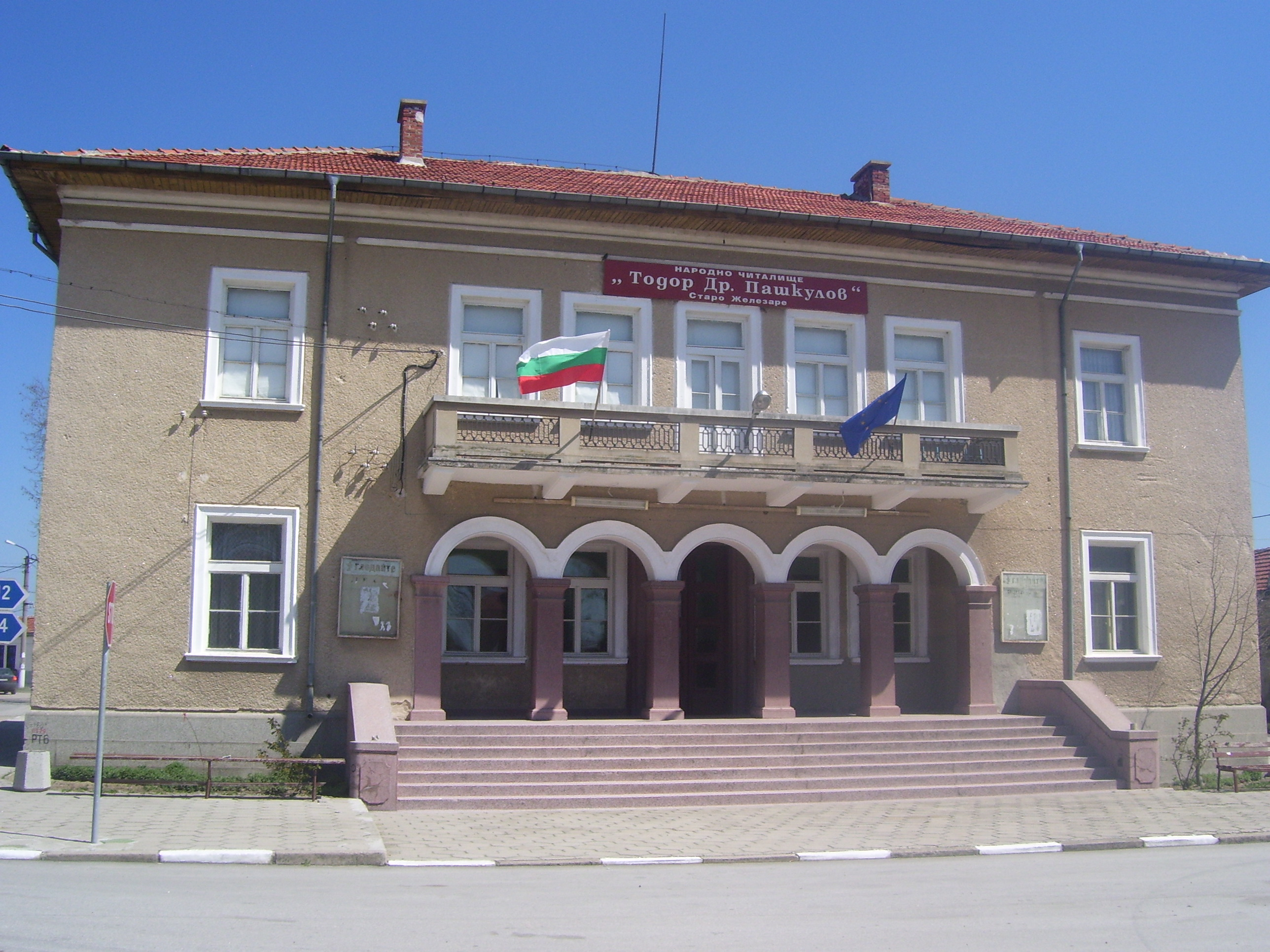
The chitalishte

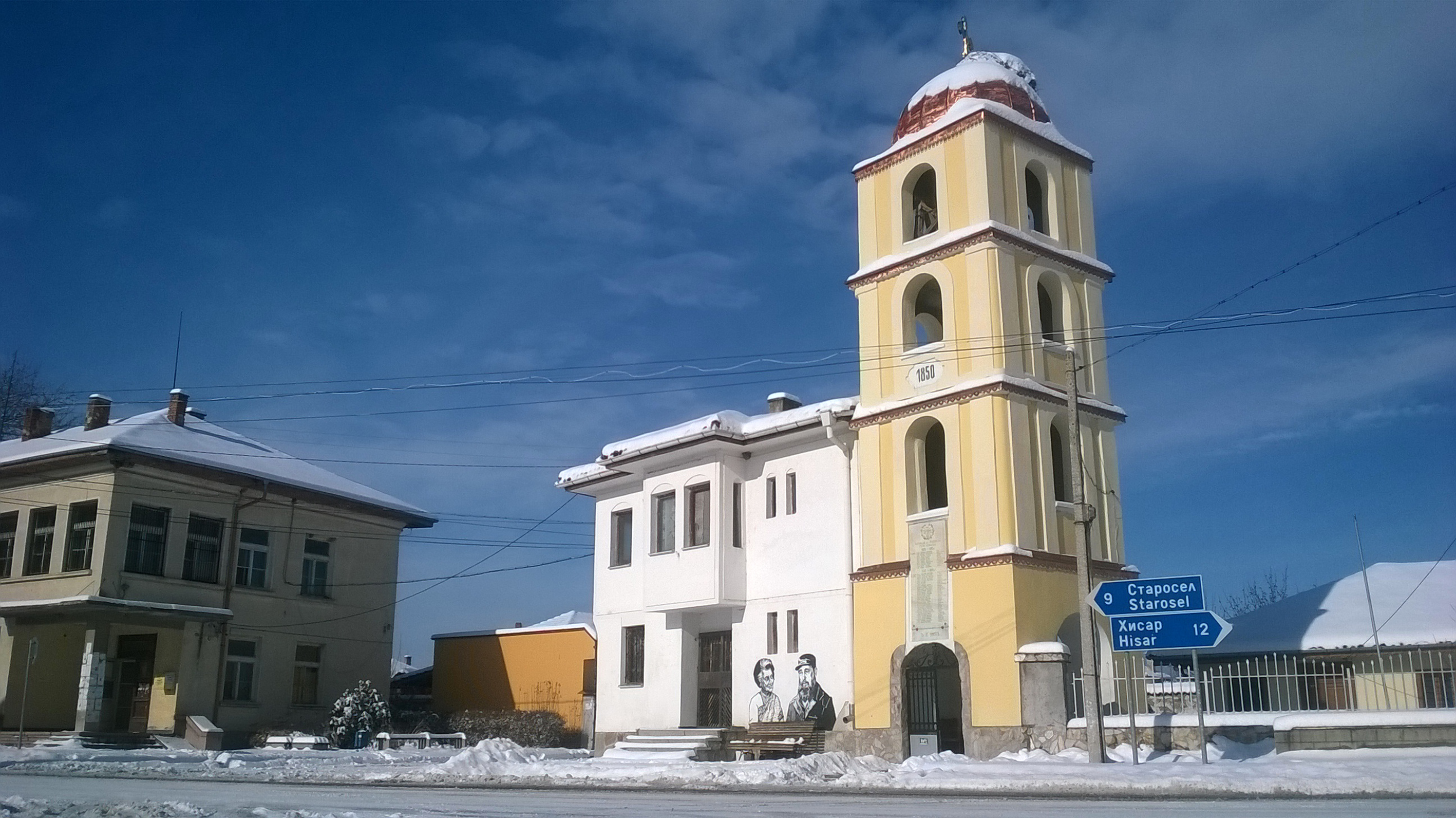
A winter view
