= Gramada Glacier =

Glacier in Antarctica

- Location of Smith Island in the South Shetland Islands

- Location within South Shetland Islands Location within Antarctica
- Location: Smith Island; South Shetland Islands
- Coordinates: 63°02′05″S 62°34′34″W
- Length: 1.6 nautical miles (3.0 km; 1.8 mi)
- Thickness: unknown
- Terminus: Brashlyan Cove
- Status: unknown

Topographic map of Smith Island

Gramada Glacier (Bulgarian: ледник Грамада, romanized: lednik Gramada, IPA: [ˈlɛdniɡ ɡrɐˈmadɐ]) is a 1.6 nautical miles (3.0 km; 1.8 mi) long glacier on Smith Island in the South Shetland Islands, Antarctica draining the southeast slopes of Imeon Range east of Riggs Peak, southeast of Madan Saddle and south of Neofit Peak. It is situated southwest of Armira Glacier and northeast of Letnitsa Glacier, and flows southeastward into Brashlyan Cove on Osmar Strait. The glacier is named after the town of Gramada in northwestern Bulgaria.

== Location ==
Gramada glacier is centred at 63°02′05″S 62°34′34″W. Bulgarian early mapping in 2009.

== See also ==
- List of glaciers in the Antarctic
- Glaciology

== Maps ==
- Chart of South Shetland including Coronation Island, &c. from the exploration of the sloop Dove in the years 1821 and 1822 by George Powell Commander of the same. Scale ca. 1:200000. London: Laurie, 1822.
- L.L. Ivanov. Antarctica: Livingston Island and Greenwich, Robert, Snow and Smith Islands. Scale 1:120000 topographic map. Troyan: Manfred Wörner Foundation, 2010. ISBN 978-954-92032-9-5 (First edition 2009. ISBN 978-954-92032-6-4)
- South Shetland Islands: Smith and Low Islands. Scale 1:150000 topographic map No. 13677. British Antarctic Survey, 2009.
- Antarctic Digital Database (ADD). Scale 1:250000 topographic map of Antarctica. Scientific Committee on Antarctic Research (SCAR). Since 1993, regularly upgraded and updated.
- L.L. Ivanov. Antarctica: Livingston Island and Smith Island. Scale 1:100000 topographic map. Manfred Wörner Foundation, 2017. ISBN 978-619-90008-3-0
