= Madan, Smolyan Province =

Madan
- Location of Madan, Bulgaria
- Coordinates: 41°30′N 24°57′E
- Country: Bulgaria
- Provinces (Oblast): Smolyan

Government
  - Mayor: Fahri Molaysenov
- Elevation: 851 m (2,792 ft)

Population (2019-02-28)
  - Total: 6,597
- Time zone: UTC+2 (EET)
  - Summer (DST): UTC+3 (EEST)
- Postal Code: 4900
- Area code: 0308

Madan (Bulgarian: Мадан [mɐˈdan]) is a town in Smolyan Province, the very south of Bulgaria in the Yellow Share of the Rhodope Mountains. It is the administrative centre of the homonymous Madan Municipality. In 2019, the town had a population of 6,597.

== Geography ==
Madan is a part of Ardino Ridge, sloping down to the northeast between the rivers Arda and Varbitsa. In the central part of the Yellow Share rise the peaks Buchovitsa (1404 m), Veternitsa (1372 m) and Petrovitsa (1309 m).

The end of the ridge is Alada Peak (1241 m). From all sides the Yellow Share is separated by mountain-spurs, whose segmentations gradually slope down and vanish into the valleys of the rivers. The river system of the region is presented by the basins of the upper reaches of some of the longer rivers – to the north the basin of the Arda River with the headers Elhovska and Chepinska Rivers.

== History and population ==
Madan is an ancient ore-miners' settlement, the extraction of lead ore having begun around 5th-4th century BC.

Most of the town's population consists of local Pomaks and a minority of Eastern Orthodox Bulgarians.

== Honour ==
Madan Saddle on Smith Island, South Shetland Islands is named after Madan.
