= Organa Peak =

Mountain in South Shetland Islands, Antarctica

Coordinates: 63°03′02″S 62°37′47″W

Location of Smith Island in the South Shetland Islands.

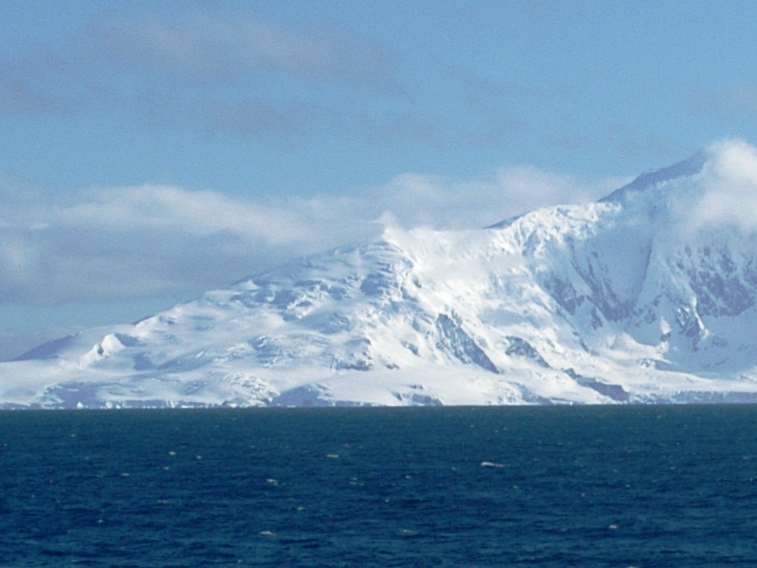
Organa Peak

Topographic map of Smith Island.

Organa Peak (Bulgarian: връх Органа, romanized: vrah Organa, IPA: [ˈvrɤx orˈɡanɐ]) is a peak rising to 1194 m in Imeon Range on Smith Island, South Shetland Islands. Situated 6.8 km northeast of Cape James, and 1.85 km south-southwest of Riggs Peak. Overlooking Letnitsa Glacier to the east and southeast, and Kremena Ice Piedmont to the south. Bulgarian early mapping in 2009. Named after the Bulgarian ruler Organa (7th Century AD), regent of Bulgars and uncle of Khan Kubrat.

== Maps ==
- Chart of South Shetland including Coronation Island, &c. from the exploration of the sloop Dove in the years 1821 and 1822 by George Powell Commander of the same. Scale ca. 1:200000. London: Laurie, 1822.
- L.L. Ivanov. Antarctica: Livingston Island and Greenwich, Robert, Snow and Smith Islands. Scale 1:120000 topographic map. Troyan: Manfred Wörner Foundation, 2010. ISBN 978-954-92032-9-5 (First edition 2009. ISBN 978-954-92032-6-4)
- South Shetland Islands: Smith and Low Islands. Scale 1:150000 topographic map No. 13677. British Antarctic Survey, 2009.
- Antarctic Digital Database (ADD). Scale 1:250000 topographic map of Antarctica. Scientific Committee on Antarctic Research (SCAR). Since 1993, regularly upgraded and updated.
- L.L. Ivanov. Antarctica: Livingston Island and Smith Island. Scale 1:100000 topographic map. Manfred Wörner Foundation, 2017. ISBN 978-619-90008-3-0
