= Mezdra =

Mezdra Мездра
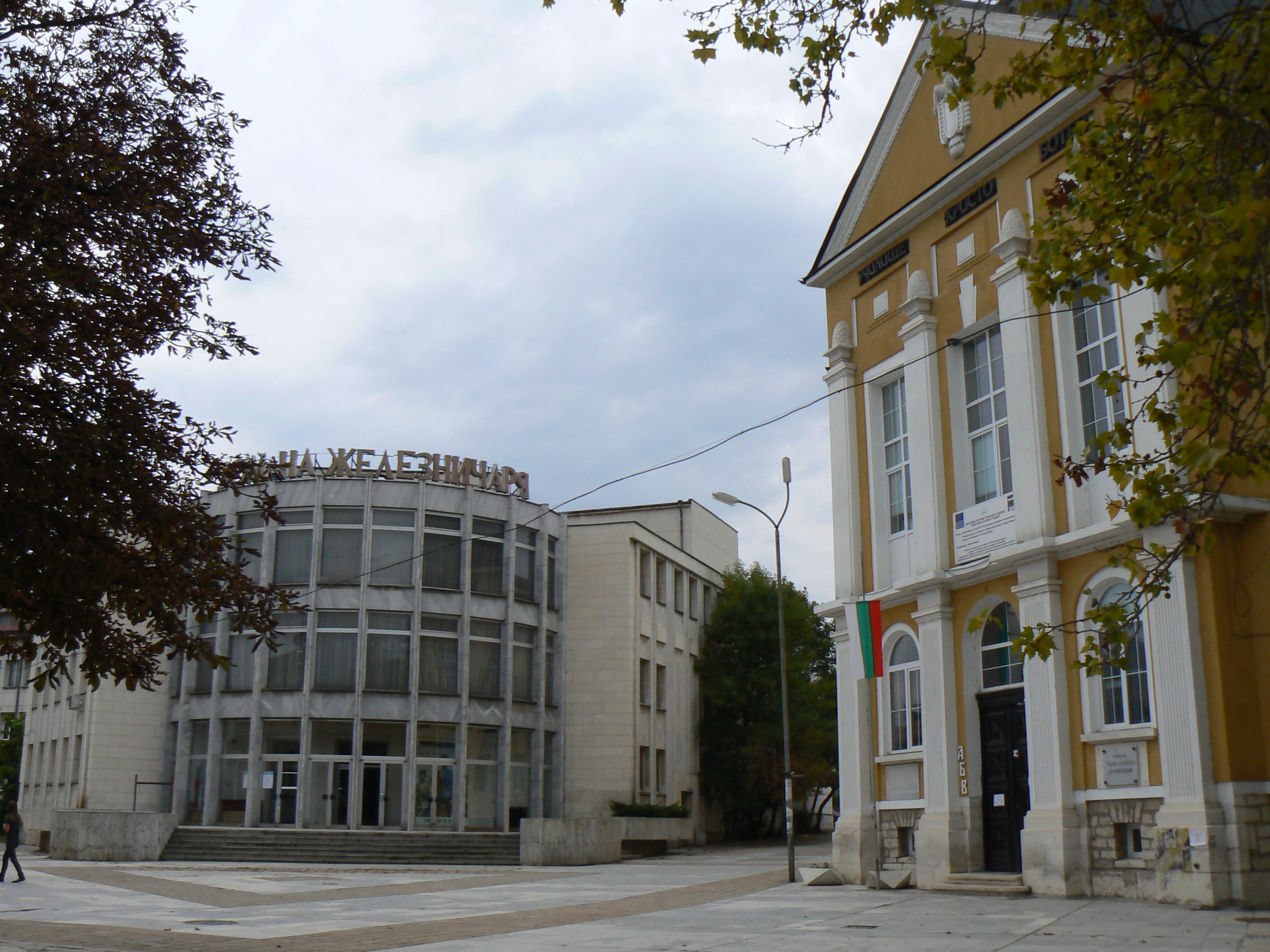
- Railwaymen's House and Hristo Botev School

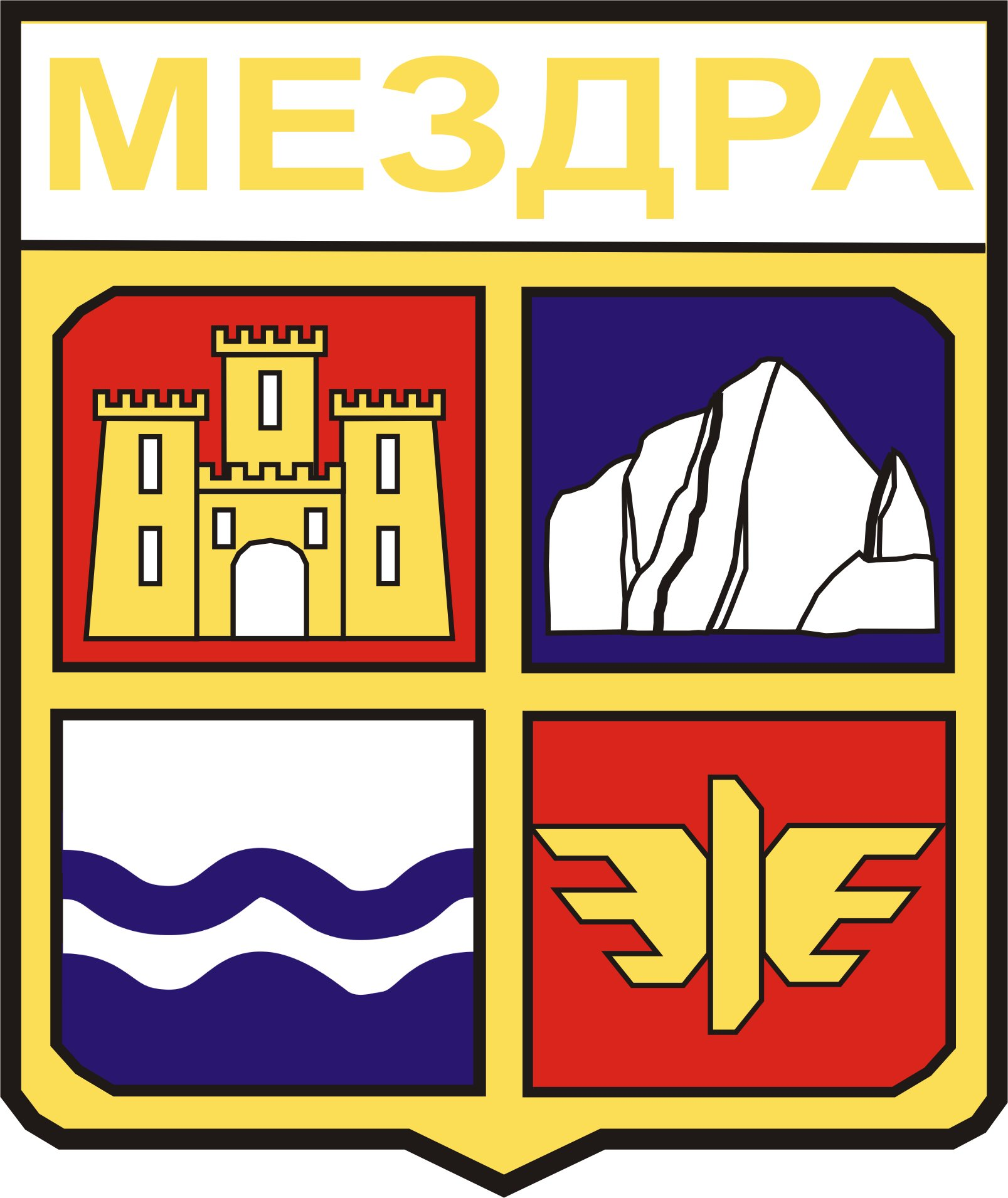
- Coat of arms

- Location of Mezdra in Bulgaria
- Coordinates: 43°9′0″N 23°42′0″E
- Country: Bulgaria
- Province (Oblast): Vratsa

Government
  - Mayor: Genadiy Sabkov (BSP)
- Elevation: 214 m (702 ft)

Population (31-12-2009)
  - City: 10,896
  - Urban: 21,726
- Time zone: UTC+2 (EET)
  - Summer (DST): UTC+3 (EEST)
- Postal Code: 3100
- Area code: (+359) 0910
- Website: Official website

Mezdra (Bulgarian: Мездра [ˈmɛzdrɐ]) is a town in northwestern Bulgaria, part of Vratsa Province. It is located on the left bank of the Iskar River, just north of its gorge through the Balkan Mountains.

== History ==
Although the area around it has been inhabited continuously since prehistoric times, Mezdra remained a small village of 86 residents (1881 census) and continued to decline (76 residents in 1888) until 1893, when the construction of the Sofia-Varna railway began, with workers from all around the country arriving to update the infrastructure. As the village became an important railway junction with the opening of the railway on 20 February 1897, its population grew substantially. Mezdra had a population of 311 in 1900 and 1,015 in 1920.

Although it formally remained a village until proclaimed a town on 31 August 1950, Mezdra acquired the appearance of a small town through the work of architects who studied in Western Europe and established the Western European style in the village.

Today, Mezdra is a town of approximately 10,896 residents and serves as a vital rail link between Sofia and northern/western regions of Bulgaria (including the Sofia-Varna route, linking the capital with Bulgaria's 3rd largest city and popular Black Sea destination). Industries include stone cutting, brickmaking and beer production.

Mezdra Point on Snow Island in the South Shetland Islands, Antarctica is named after Mezdra.

== Geography ==
=== Municipality ===
Mezdra is also the seat of Mezdra municipality (part of Vratsa Province), which includes the following 27 villages:

- Bodenets
- Brusen
- Darmantsi
- Dolna Kremena
- Eliseyna
- Gorna Beshovitsa
- Gorna Kremena
- Ignatitsa
- Kalen
- Krapets
- Kreta
- Lik
- Lyutibrod
- Lyutidol
- Moravitsa
- Oselna
- Oslen Krivodol
- Ochindol
- Rebarkovo
- Ruska Bela
- Staro Selo
- Tipchenitsa
- Tsakonitsa
- Tsarevets
- Varbeshnitsa
- Zlidol
- Zverino

== Notable people ==
- Ceci Krasimirova (born 1980), fashion modeler

== Twin towns – sister cities ==
- Mammola, Italy

== Gallery ==
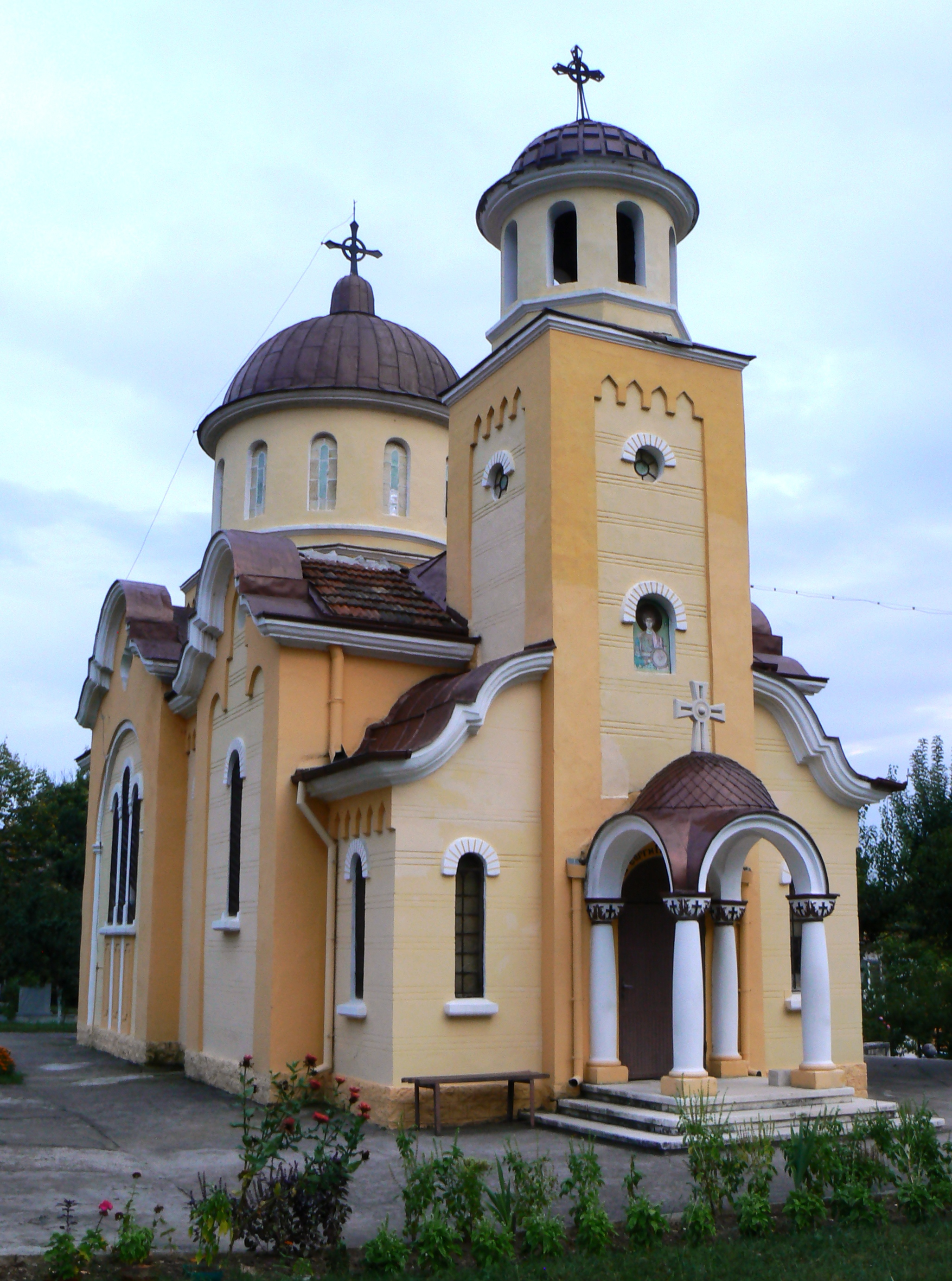
Church of St George

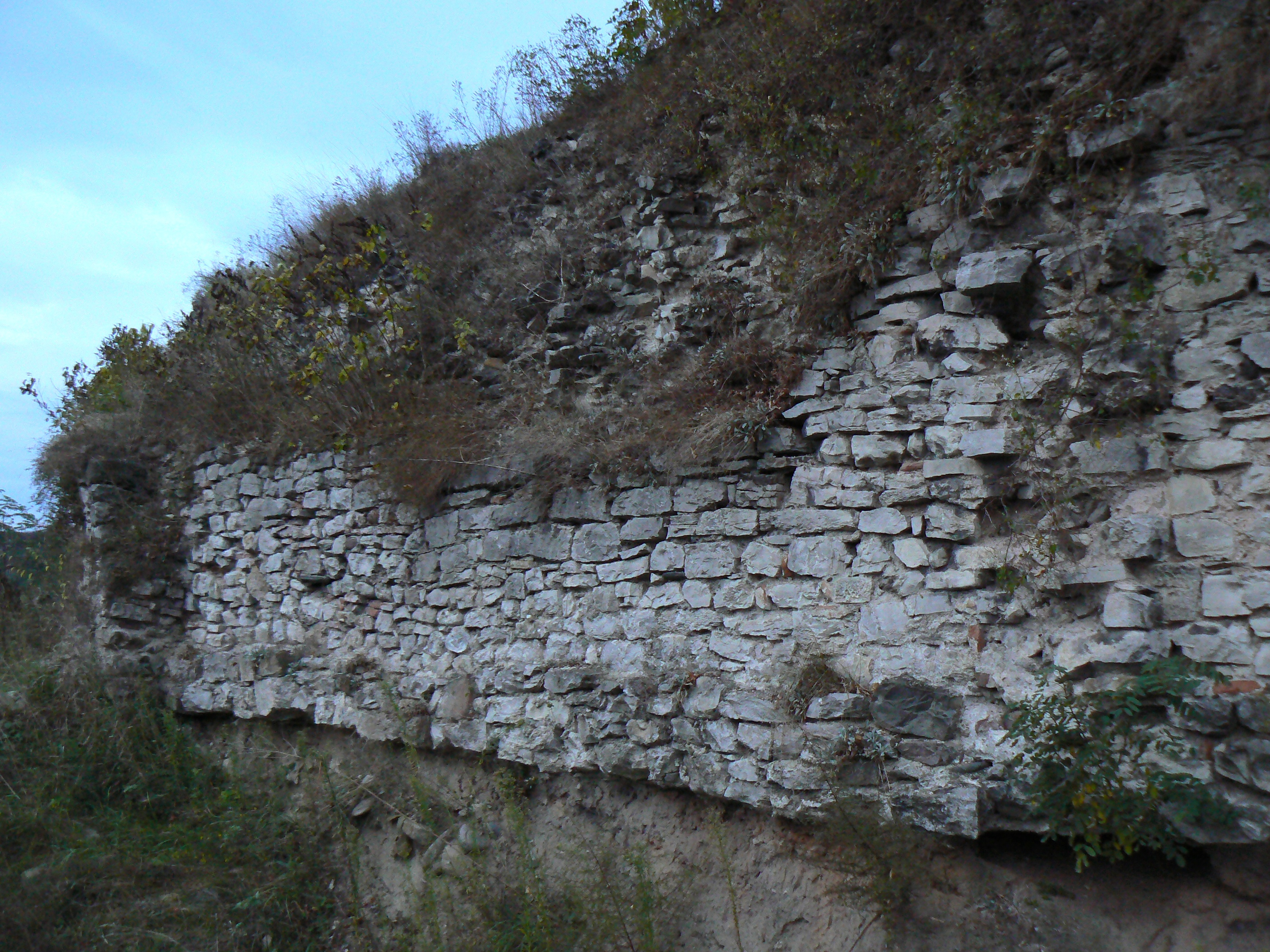
Ruins of the ancient and medieval Mezdra Fortress

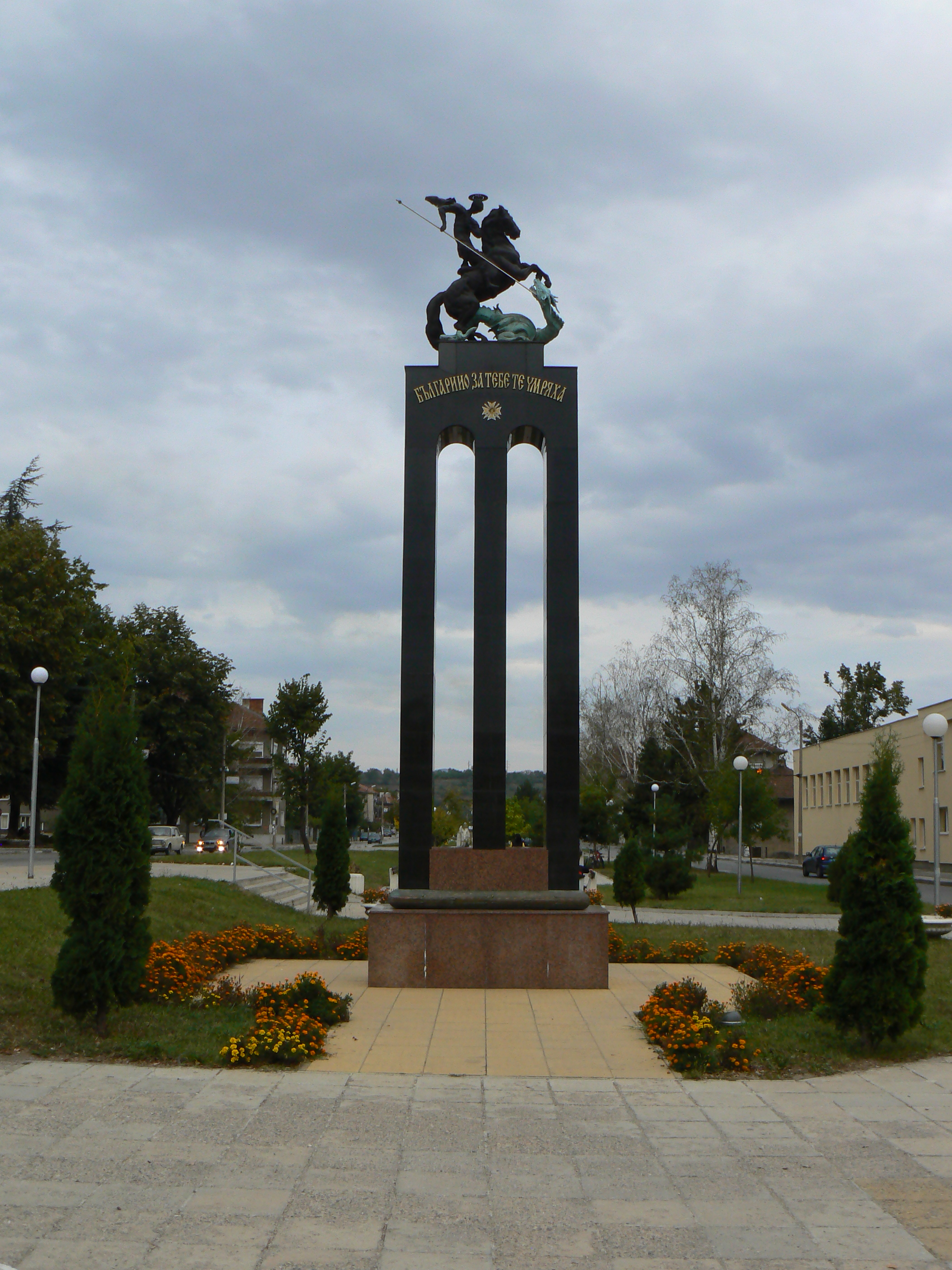
War memorial

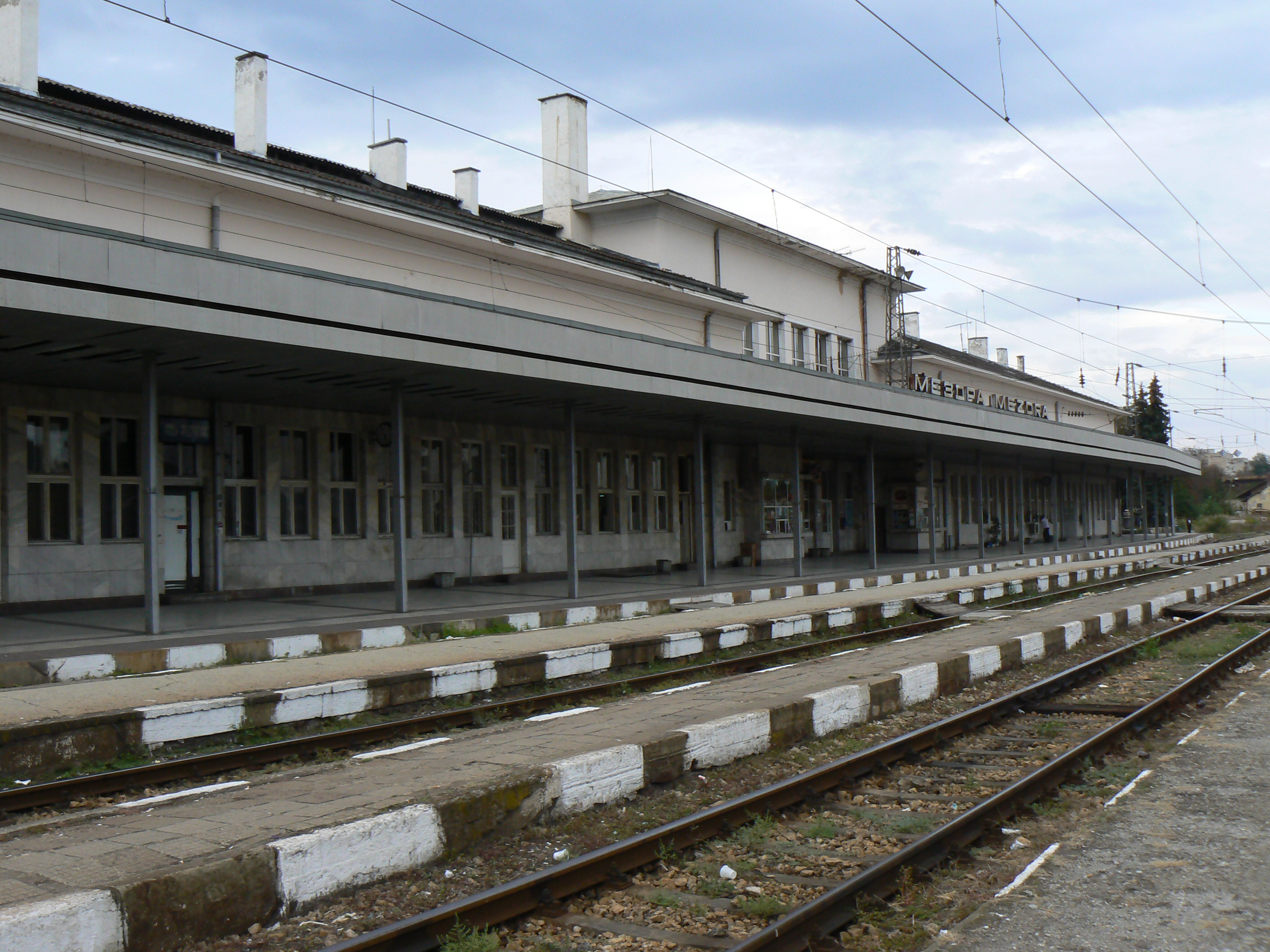
Railway station
