= Hisarya Cove =

Cove in the South Shetland Islands, Antarctica

Coordinates: 63°03′29″S 62°35′36″W

Location of Smith Island in the South Shetland Islands.

Topographic map of Smith Island.

Hisarya Cove (Bulgarian: залив Хисаря, romanized: zaliv Hisarya, IPA: [ˈzalif xiˈsarʲɐ]) is the 950 m wide cove on the northwest side of Osmar Strait indenting for 500 m the southeast coast of Smith Island in the South Shetland Islands, Antarctica south of Dupnitsa Point and 7.6 km northeast of Cape James. Its head is fed by Letnitsa Glacier. Bulgarian early mapping in 2009.

The cove is named after the town of Hisarya in southern Bulgaria.

== Maps ==
- Chart of South Shetland including Coronation Island, &c. from the exploration of the sloop Dove in the years 1821 and 1822 by George Powell Commander of the same. Scale ca. 1:200000. London: Laurie, 1822.
- L.L. Ivanov. Antarctica: Livingston Island and Greenwich, Robert, Snow and Smith Islands. Scale 1:120000 topographic map. Troyan: Manfred Wörner Foundation, 2010. ISBN 978-954-92032-9-5 (First edition 2009. ISBN 978-954-92032-6-4)
- South Shetland Islands: Smith and Low Islands. Scale 1:150000 topographic map No. 13677. British Antarctic Survey, 2009.
- Antarctic Digital Database (ADD). Scale 1:250000 topographic map of Antarctica. Scientific Committee on Antarctic Research (SCAR). Since 1993, regularly upgraded and updated.
- L.L. Ivanov. Antarctica: Livingston Island and Smith Island. Scale 1:100000 topographic map. Manfred Wörner Foundation, 2017. ISBN 978-619-90008-3-0
