= Kremena Ice Piedmont =

Glacier in the South Shetland Islands, Antarctica

Location of Smith Island in the South Shetland Islands.

Topographic map of Smith Island.

Kremena Ice Piedmont (Bulgarian: ледник Кремена, romanized: lednik Kremena, IPA: [ˈlɛdnik krɛˈmɛnɐ]) is a 2.4 km long and 2.7 km wide glacier on Smith Island in the South Shetland Islands, Antarctica draining the southeast slopes of Imeon Range south of Organa Peak. Draining southeastwards to flow into Osmar Strait.

The glacier is named after the settlements of Kremena in northeastern Bulgaria, and Upper and Lower Kremena in northwestern Bulgaria.

== Location ==
Kremena Ice Piedmont is located at 63°04′00″S 62°38′00″W. Bulgarian mapping in 2009.

== Maps ==
- Chart of South Shetland including Coronation Island, &c. from the exploration of the sloop Dove in the years 1821 and 1822 by George Powell Commander of the same. Scale ca. 1:200000. London: Laurie, 1822.
- L.L. Ivanov. Antarctica: Livingston Island and Greenwich, Robert, Snow and Smith Islands. Scale 1:120000 topographic map. Troyan: Manfred Wörner Foundation, 2010. ISBN 978-954-92032-9-5 (First edition 2009. ISBN 978-954-92032-6-4)
- South Shetland Islands: Smith and Low Islands. Scale 1:150000 topographic map No. 13677. British Antarctic Survey, 2009.
- Antarctic Digital Database (ADD). Scale 1:250000 topographic map of Antarctica. Scientific Committee on Antarctic Research (SCAR). Since 1993, regularly upgraded and updated.
- L.L. Ivanov. Antarctica: Livingston Island and Smith Island. Scale 1:100000 topographic map. Manfred Wörner Foundation, 2017. ISBN 978-619-90008-3-0
