= Ceci Krasimirova =

Bulgarian model (born 1980)

- Born: 24 January 1980 (age 45); Mezdra, Bulgaria
- Occupation(s): Model, entrepreneur
- Years active: 1990–present
- Height: 177 cm (5 ft 10 in)
- Children: 1
- Awards: Best Model of Bulgaria (1997), Best Model of Europe (1997)
- Website: www.cecikrasimirova.com

Ceca Krasimirova Dimitrova (born 24 January 1980) more commonly known as Ceci Krasimirova, has been a Bulgarian fashion model since 1990. She is currently continuing her modeling career while building her own private business in various fields.

== Early life ==
Ceci Krasimirova was born in Mezdra, Bulgaria. In 1988, she and her family, moved to live in Sofia, Bulgaria. Later on she graduated from the choreography school in Elin Pelin, Bulgaria, majoring in folklore dancing.

== Career ==
At age ten, Krasimirova started her modeling career in children's fashion shows. She was noticed by modeling agency "Visage" and in 1990 officially became a model. At age 17 she participated in the beauty pageant Miss Shopkinia (1997) at which she won first place. In the same year Krasimirova also won the beauty contest "Best Model of Bulgaria" (1997), and so won the right to participate in the beauty pageant "Best Model of the World" (1997). At the latter she won the title "Best Model of Europe" (1997).

Krasimirova has taught modeling courses and was the head choreographer of the 2000 "Top Model of Bulgaria" beauty pageant. From 2005 to 2009, she was the sales manager for the Bulgaria editions of FHM, Madame Figaro, and Hallmark Channel.

From 2010 to 2012, Krasimirova was the advertising director of Rosebud magazine. She has modeled for the brands Dolce & Gabbana, Bvlgari, Nina Ricci, Stephane Rolland, Moschino among others. She has shot TV spots and commercials for brands like M-Tel, Hype Energy Drink, Advanced Nutrients, Flirt Vodka, Sandoz watches, Magama and others. In 2010, she starred as the TV host of the show High Heels on bTV.

== Titles ==
- "Miss Shopkinia" (1997)
- "Best Model of Bulgaria" (1997)
- "Best Model of Europe" (1997)
