= Ochindol =

Ochindol Очиндол
- Village
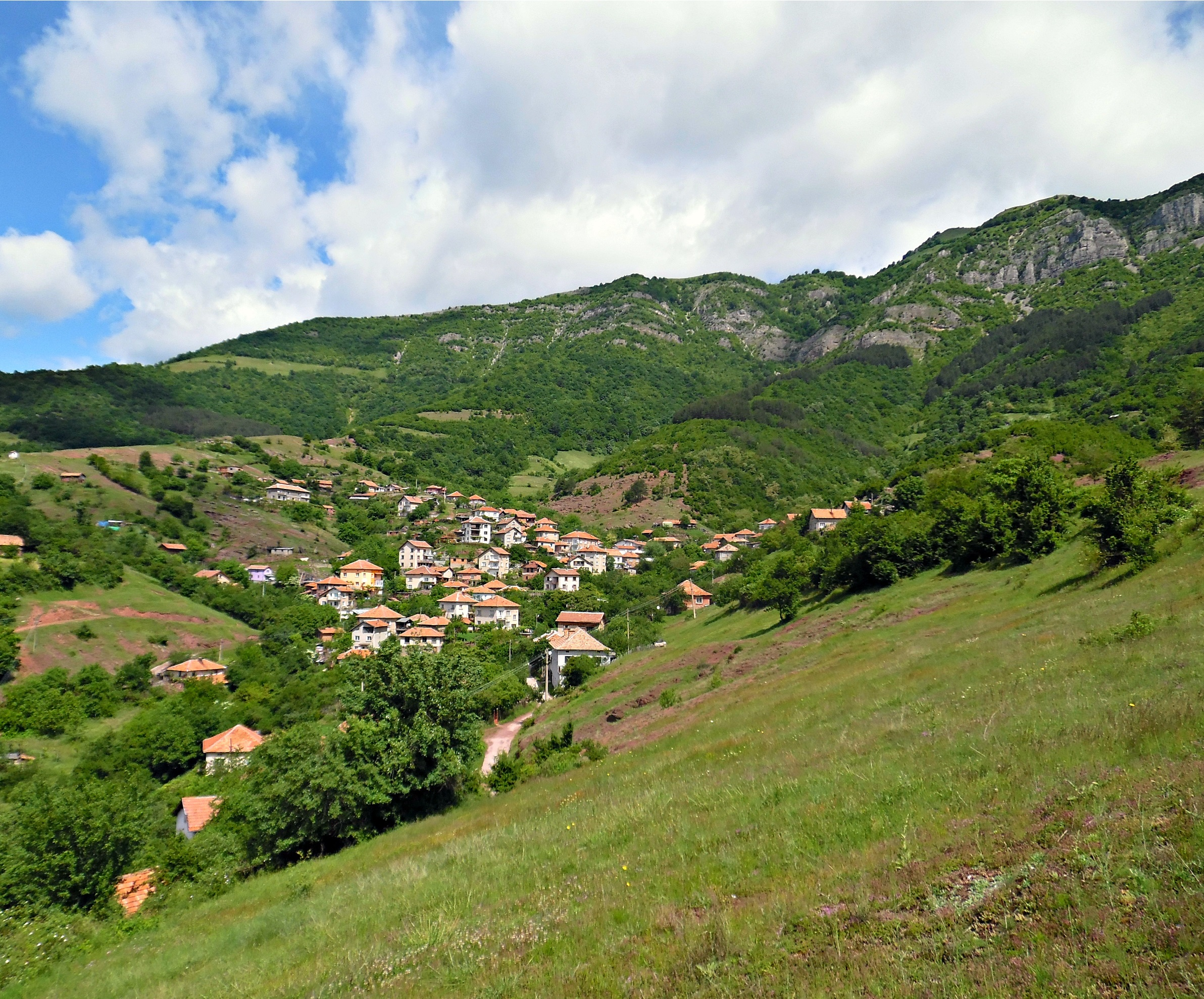

- Location within Bulgaria
- Coordinates: 43°06′N 23°28′E
- Country: Bulgaria
- Province: Vratsa Province
- Municipality: Mezdra

Government
  - Mayor: Genadi Sabkov

Area
  - Total: 28.099 km^{2} (10.849 sq mi)
- Elevation: 257 m (843 ft)

Population (31-12-2013)
  - Total: 153
- Bulgaria Guide
- Time zone: UTC+2 (EET)
  - Summer (DST): UTC+3 (EEST)
- Postal Code: 3162

Ochindol (Bulgarian: Очиндол) is a village in Mezdra Municipality in Bulgaria, located about 60 kilometers from the capital city of Sofia along the Iskar River valley, with a population of about 200. It is situated near Vrachanski Balkan Nature Park in the western Balkan Mountains.

The village contains a monument representing Ivan Vazov's character 'Grandfather Yotso', a symbol of the Liberation of Bulgaria from the Ottoman Empire and the progress of independent Bulgaria. In the midst of the Balkan Mountains, Ochindol is a village representative of the region. Recent steps towards developing small-scale tourism in the village and area have succeeded in the construction of a tourist house and eco-trails. The village can be reached by train (about 4 kilometers from the Levishte station) or by car.
