= Chernichevo, Plovdiv Province =

Chernichevo Черничево
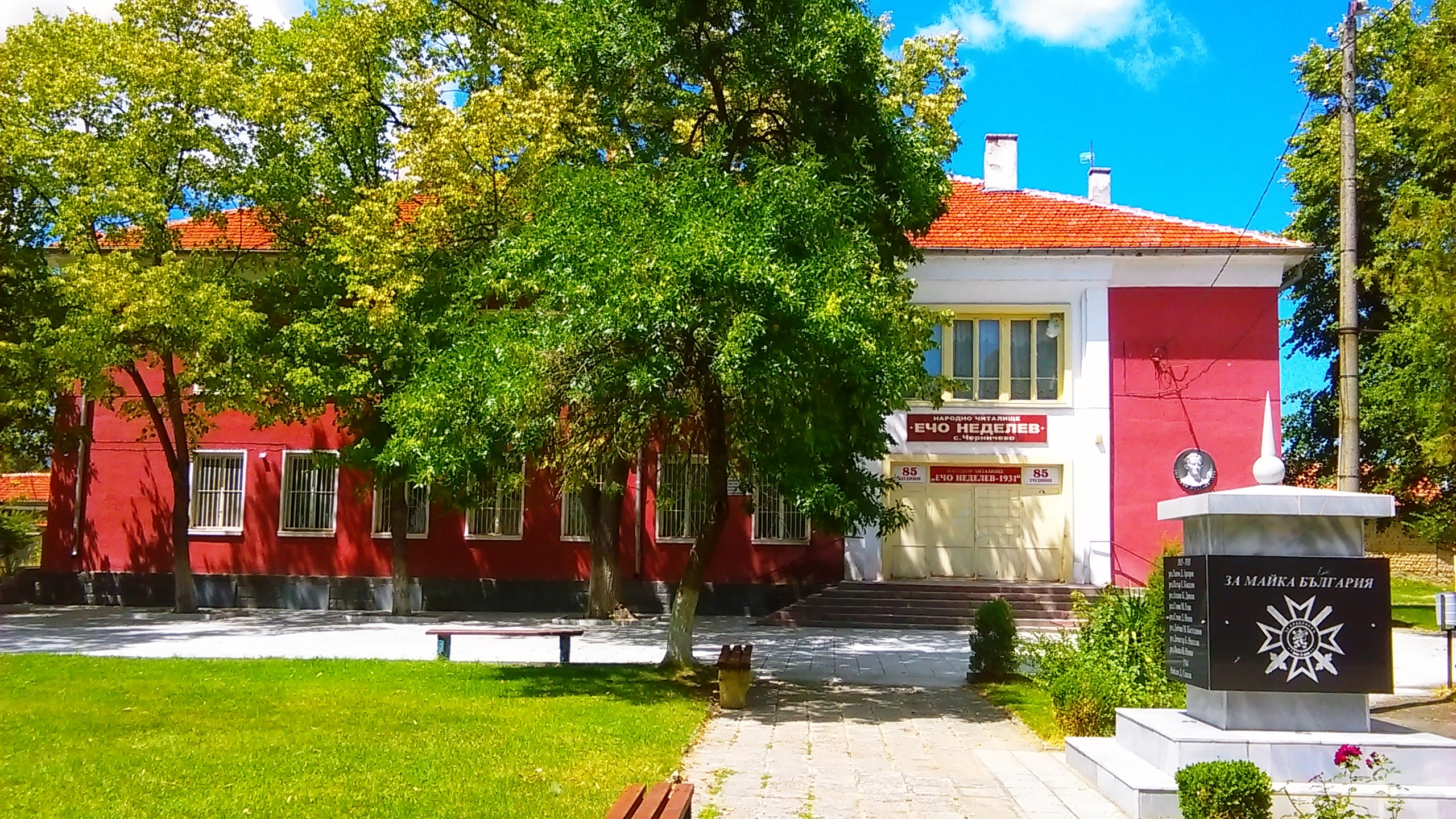

- Location of Chernichevo, Bulgaria
- Coordinates: 42°26′48.42″N 24°42′51.39″E
- Country: Bulgaria
- Provinces (Oblast): Plovdiv Province

Government
  - Mayor: Bogdan Ivanov
- Elevation: 274 m (899 ft)

Population (15.09.2022)
  - Total: 378
- Time zone: UTC+2 (EET)
  - Summer (DST): UTC+3 (EEST)
- Postal Code: 4181
- Area codes: 031792 from Bulgaria, 0035931792 from outside

Chernichevo (Bulgarian: Черничево) is a village in central Bulgaria. It has a population of 378 as of 2022.

== Geography ==
Chernichevo is located in Plovdiv Province and has a territory of 18.297 km^{2}. It is part of Hisarya Municipality and lies some 4 km south of the municipal center Hisarya. It has direct road connections with the villages of Staro Zhelezare to the west and Kaloyanovo to the south.

Chernichevo is situated in the Upper Thracian Plain, at the southern foothills of the Sredna Gora mountain range.

== Economy ==
The village is situated in a fertile agricultural region. The main crops include orchards, vegetables and grapes. The most important livestock are sheep.

== Gallery ==
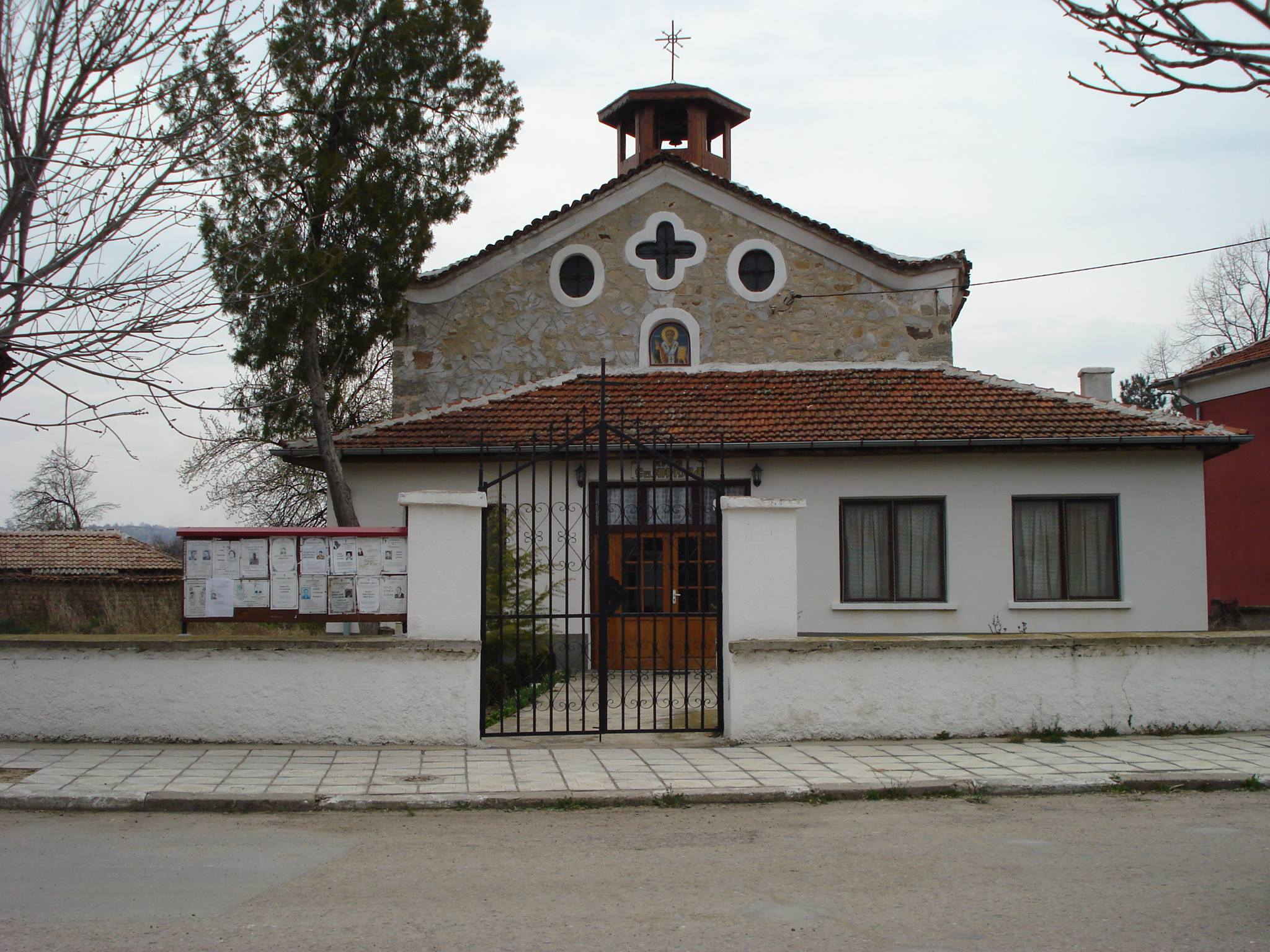

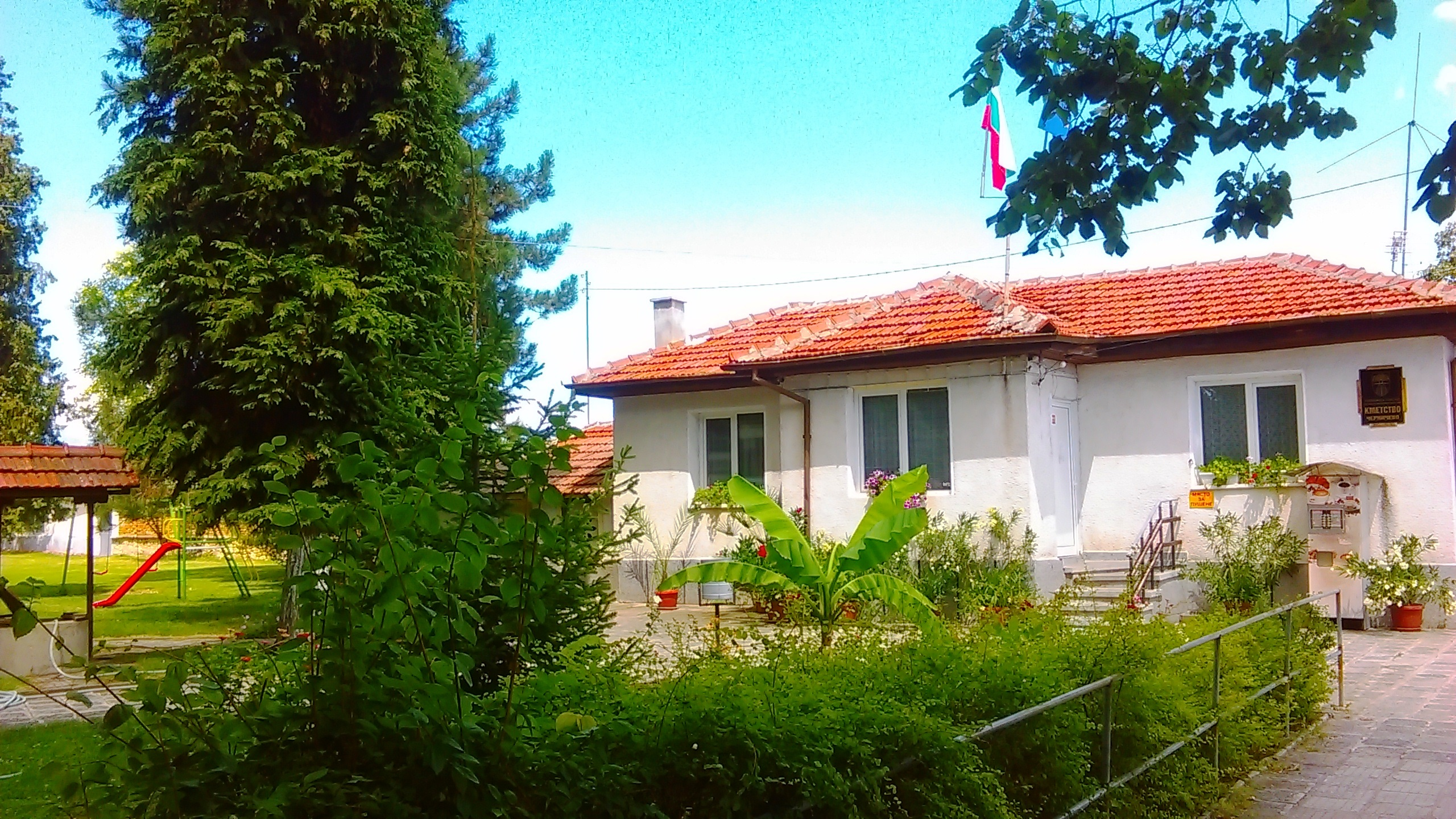

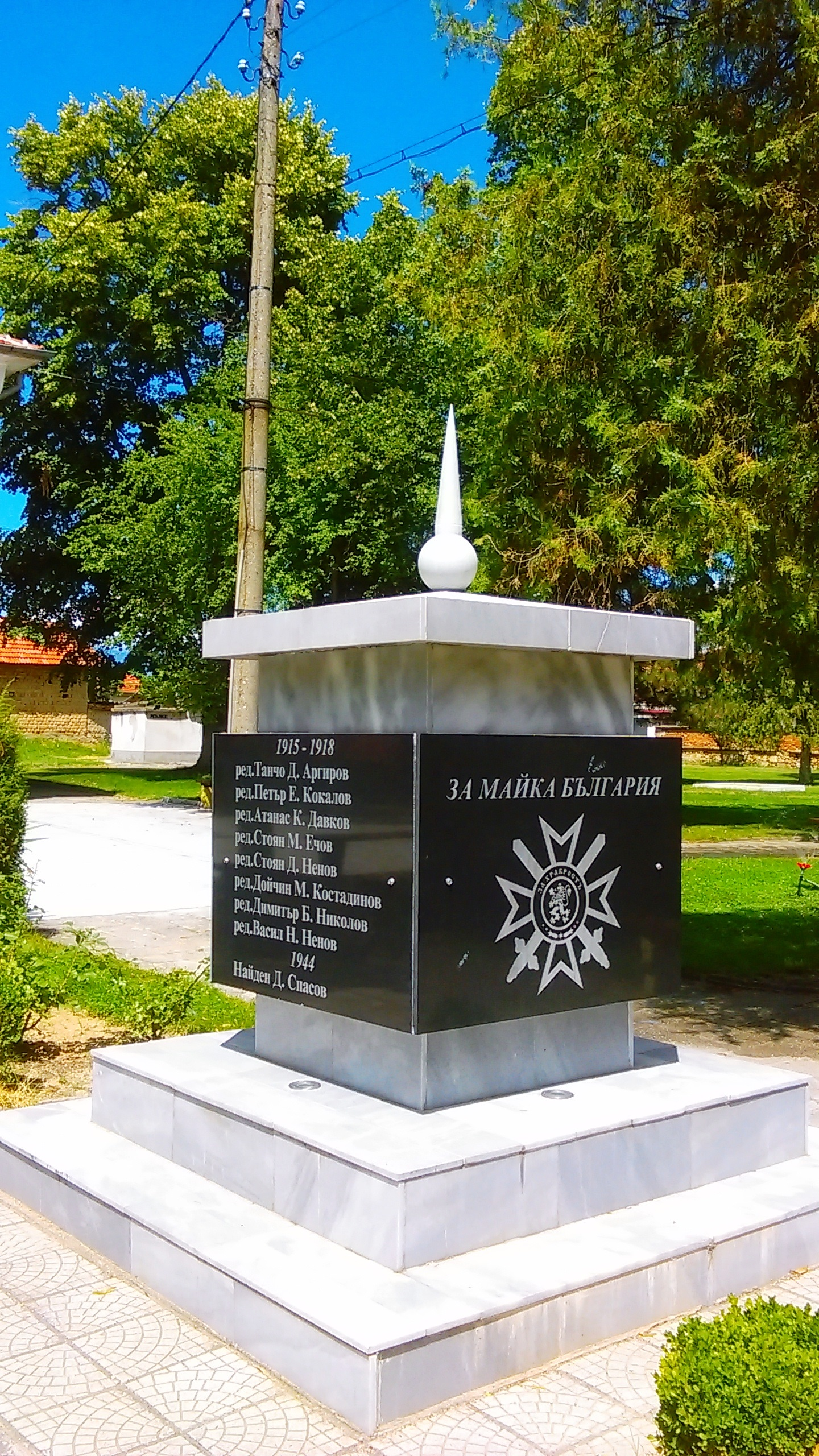
