= Staro Selo, Vratsa Province =

Staro Selo
- Location of Staro Selo
- Coordinates: 43°9′N 23°42′E
- Country: Bulgaria
- Province (Oblast): Vratsa
- Municipality: Mezdra

Population (Summer 2008)
  - Total: <200
- Time zone: UTC+2 (EET)
  - Summer (DST): UTC+3 (EEST)
- Area code: 0910

Staro Selo (Old Village) is a small village in the Vratsa Province of northwest Bulgaria. It is situated at the foot of the Balkan Mountains. Staro Selo is a part of Mezdra Municipality. It is also home to the town hall. Staro Selo is near the river Iskar, popular for its angling possibilities.

The number of inhabitants as of summer 2008 numbered less than 200 due to emigration and is still falling as young people move to nearby towns such as Mezdra, Vratsa, or even further away. Many houses are no longer inhabited permanently, having either been abandoned or turned into summer cottages.
