= Hisarya, Bulgaria =

Hisarya Хисаря
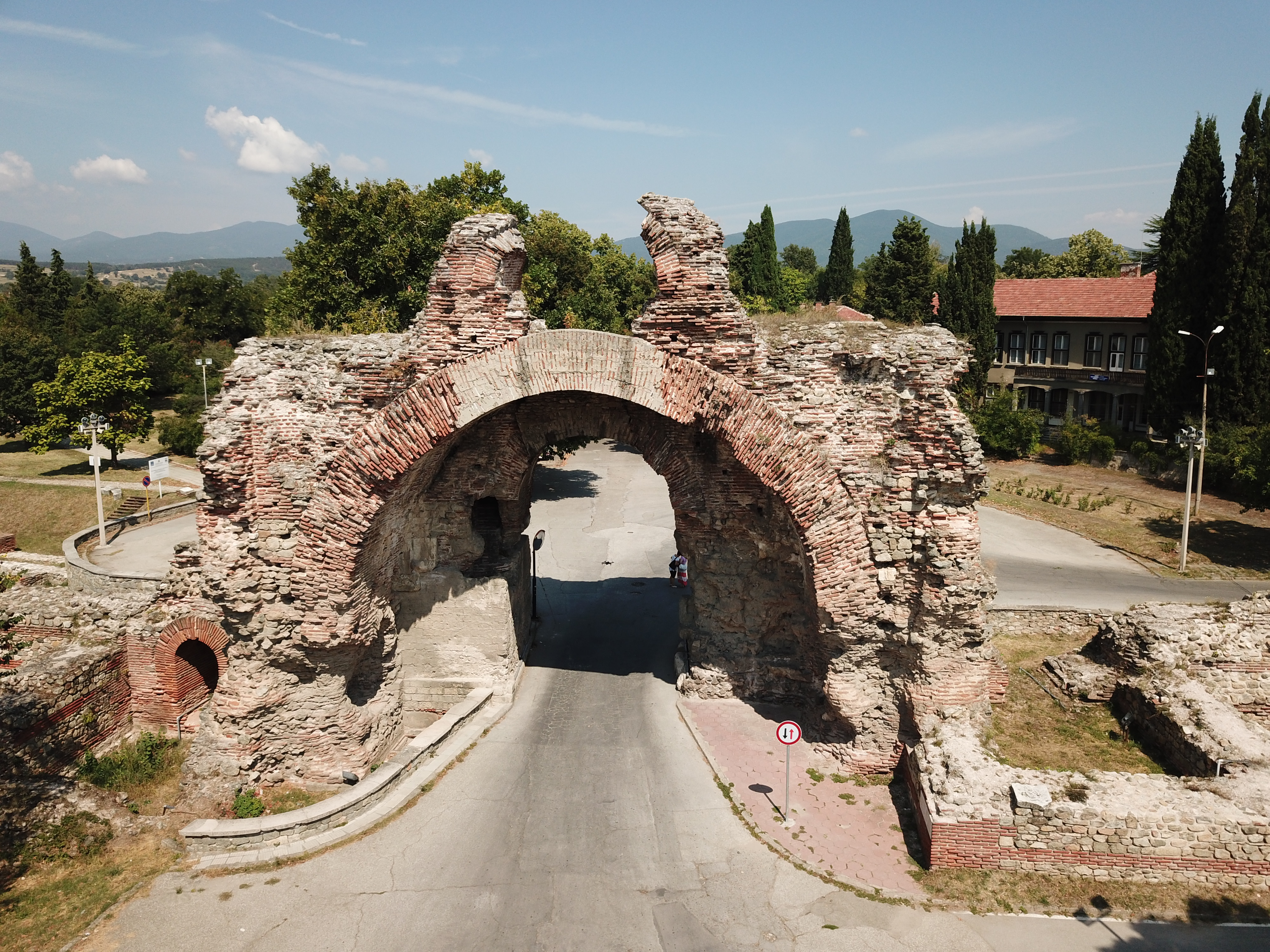
- South gate of the Roman walls

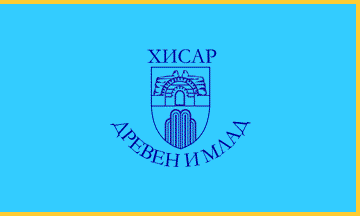
- Coat of arms

- Location of Hisarya, Bulgaria
- Coordinates: 42°30′8.89″N 24°42′11.78″E
- Country: Bulgaria
- Provinces (Oblast): Plovdiv Province

Government
  - Mayor: Iva Valcheva
- Elevation: 346 m (1,135 ft)

Population (2022)
  - Total: 6,642
- Time zone: UTC+2 (EET)
  - Summer (DST): UTC+3 (EEST)
- Postal Code: 4180
- Area codes: 0337 from Bulgaria, 00359337 from outside

Hisarya (Bulgarian: Хисаря [xiˈsarʲɐ], also known as Hisar, Hissar or Hissarya, formerly: Toplitsa) is a small town and a major spa resort in Plovdiv Province, central Bulgaria. The town is located at the southern foothills of the Sredna Gora mountain range facing the Upper Thracian Plain.

Hisar means 'fort, castle' in Arabic. The word was adopted in Turkish.

== History ==
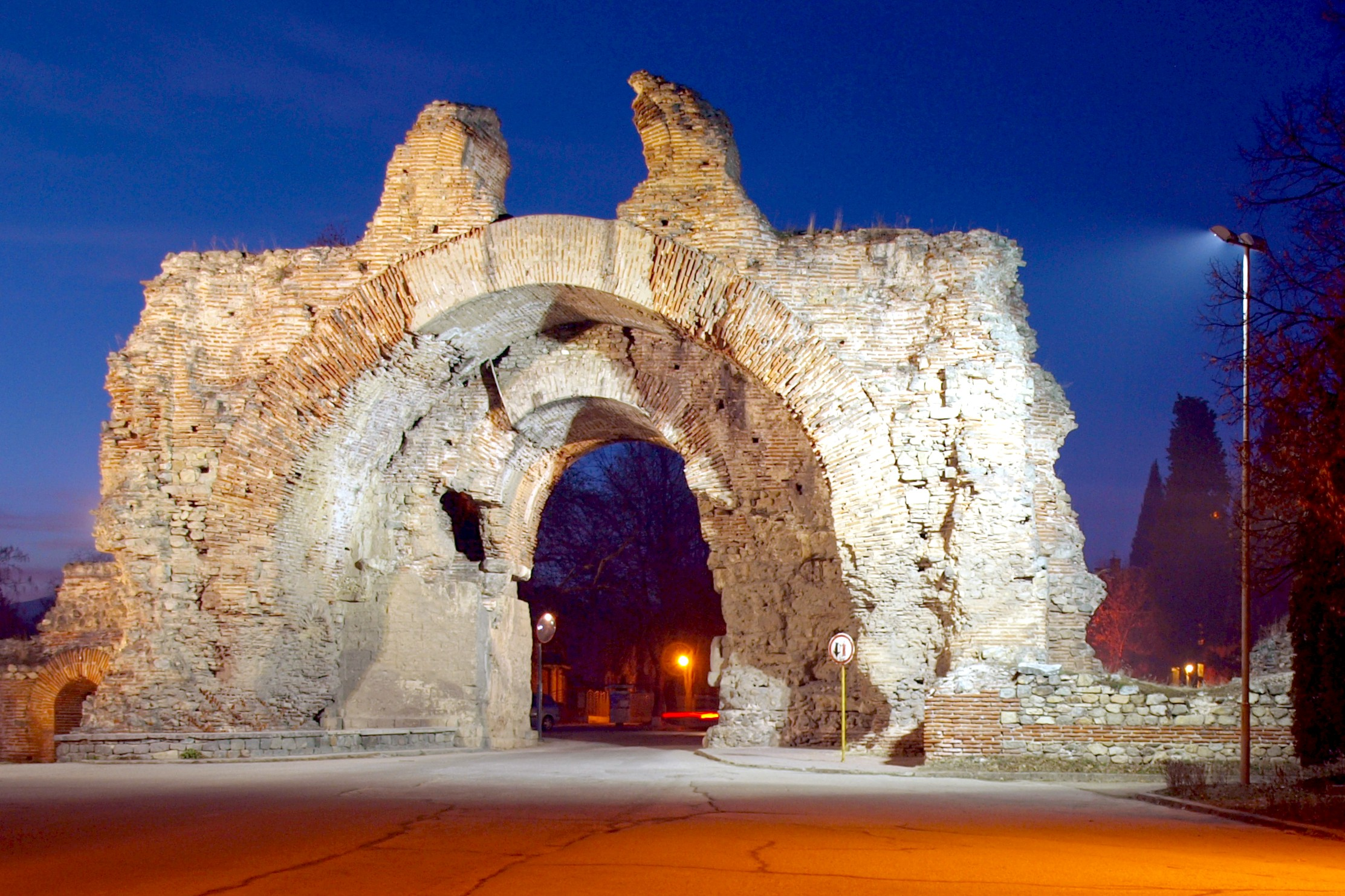
The South gate of Hisarya's Late Roman fortifications, the largest preserved in the country

The town was founded thousands of years ago probably on account of its hot springs. Some prehistoric remains have been found in what is now the town centre. Later, it became a Thracian city and, when Thrace fell to the Romans and became a Roman province, Hisarya became a Roman town — one of the three most important towns in the province. At times it was called Augusta, Diocletianopolis (after emperor Diocletian), and a couple of other names. It was a famous resort even in those times, which is proved by the fact that emperor Septimius Severus visited the city.

Many Roman ruins are visible everywhere — public buildings, a small amphitheatre, the barracks of the Roman garrison, the foundations of a couple of the oldest churches in Bulgaria, as well as the best-preserved Roman city walls in Bulgaria. The southern gate is known as "The Camels", because it had broken in the middle and looked like two camels facing each other, before it was partially restored in the early 20th century.

In medieval times it was known as Sebastopolis and, later on, as Alexiopolis or Neokastron.

After the fall of the Roman Empire, the prosperous city declined. When it was included within the borders of Bulgaria, it was just a minor fortified town. During the Turkish rule, it further declined and, at some point, the once-prosperous city was just a couple of small houses in the midst of many Roman ruins, which peasants from the nearby villages used for a stone quarry, destroying most of them in the process.

After the liberation of Bulgaria in 1878, Hisarya was included in the province of Eastern Rumelia; in 1885 it became a part of Bulgaria.

It prospered once again when the mineral springs were rediscovered and the place became a popular recreation spot.

After Bulgaria joined EU in 2007 various financing programs were used to recover the ancient ruins and renovate the park and street infrastructure. ^{[Reference?]}

== Honour ==
Hisarya Cove in Smith Island, South Shetland Islands is named after Hisarya.

== Gallery ==
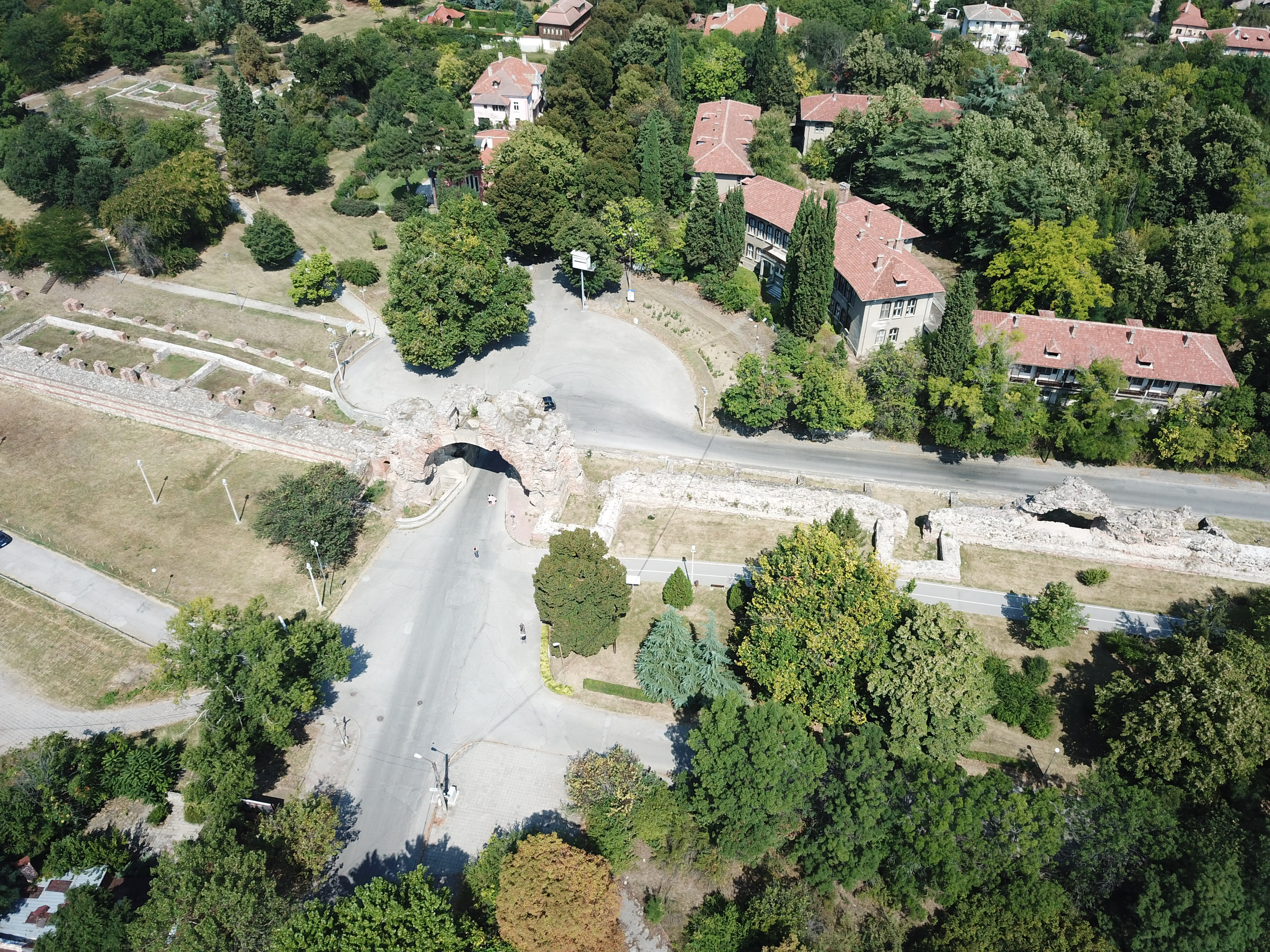
The South Gate from above

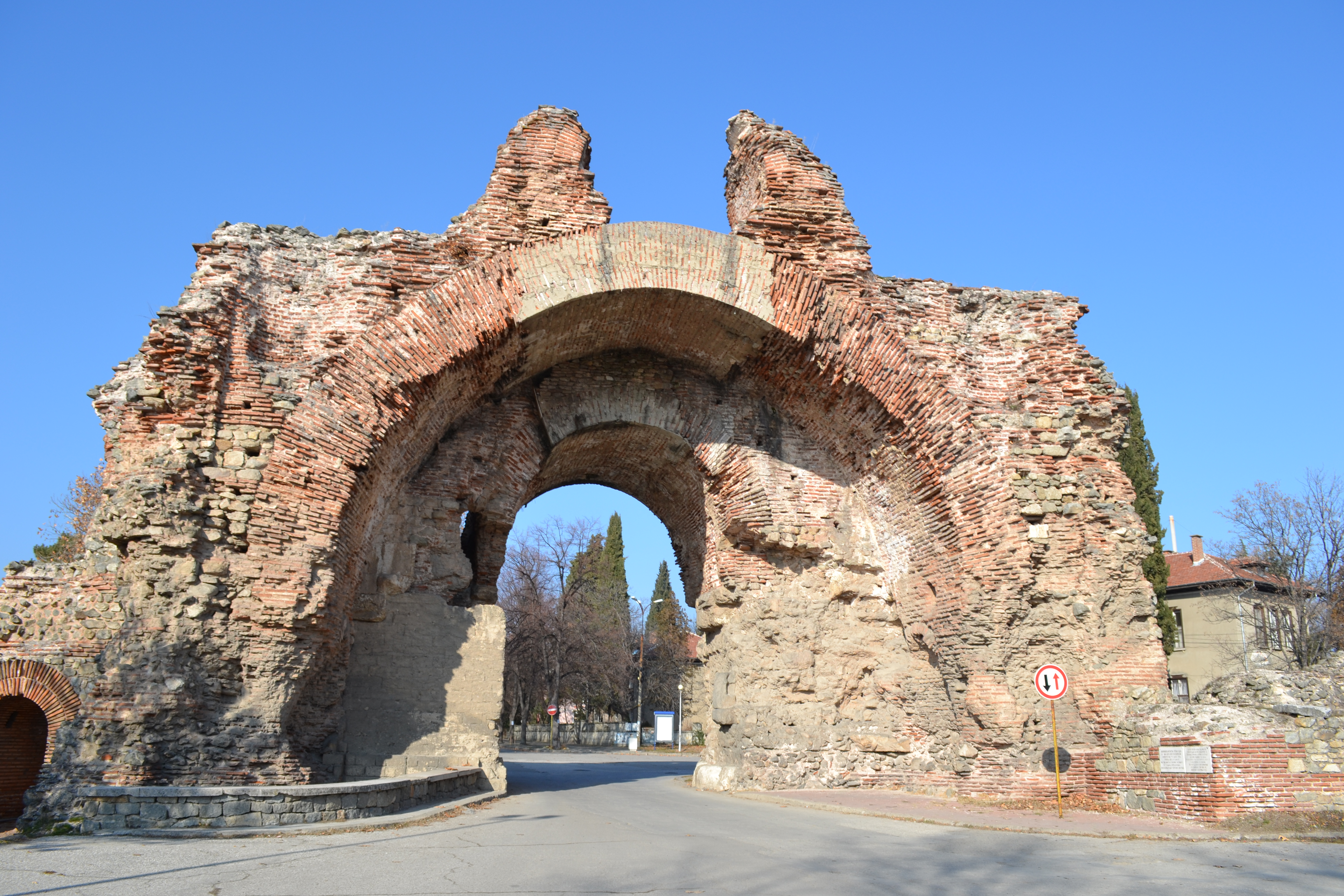
The South Gate

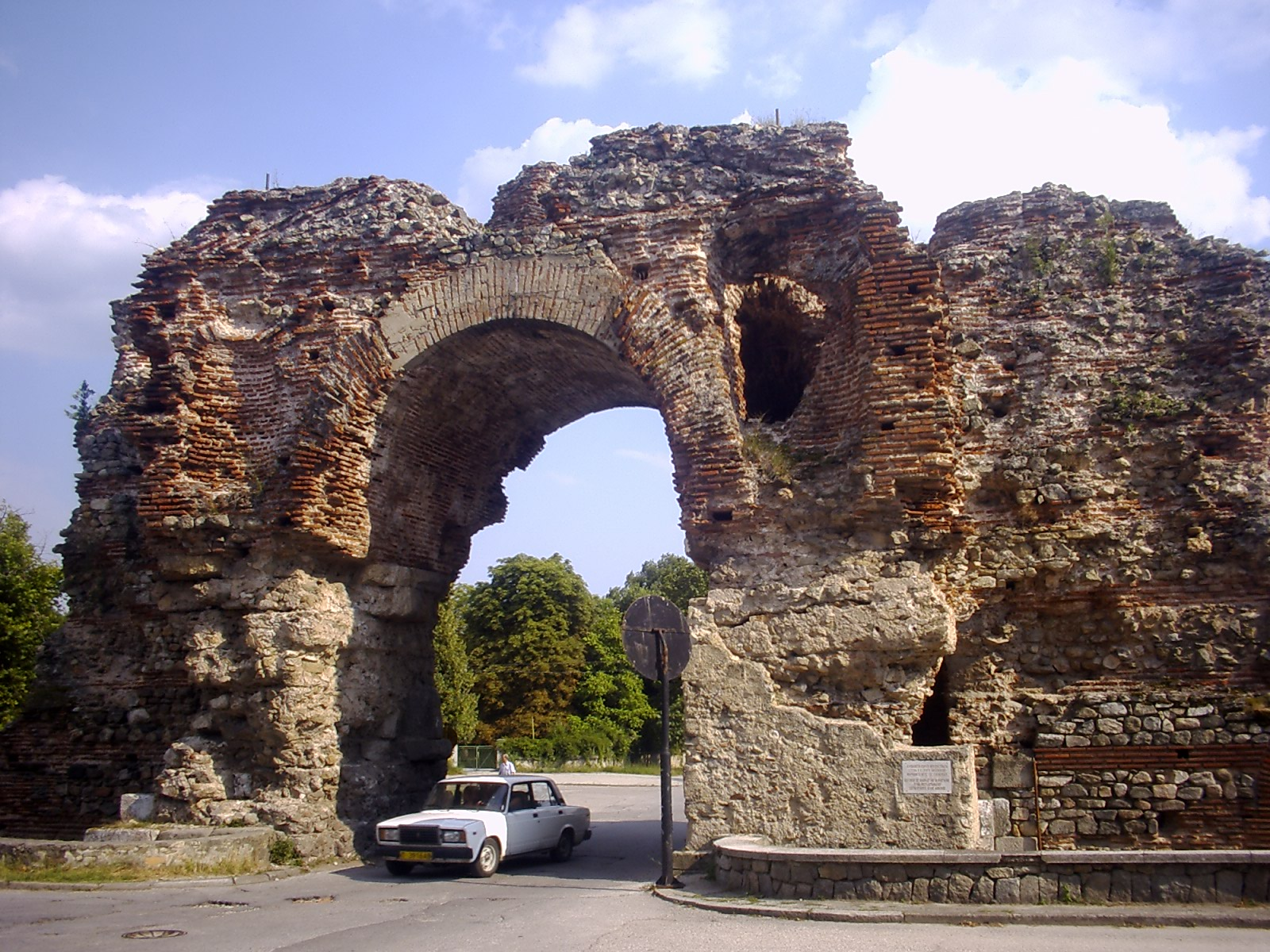
The South Gate

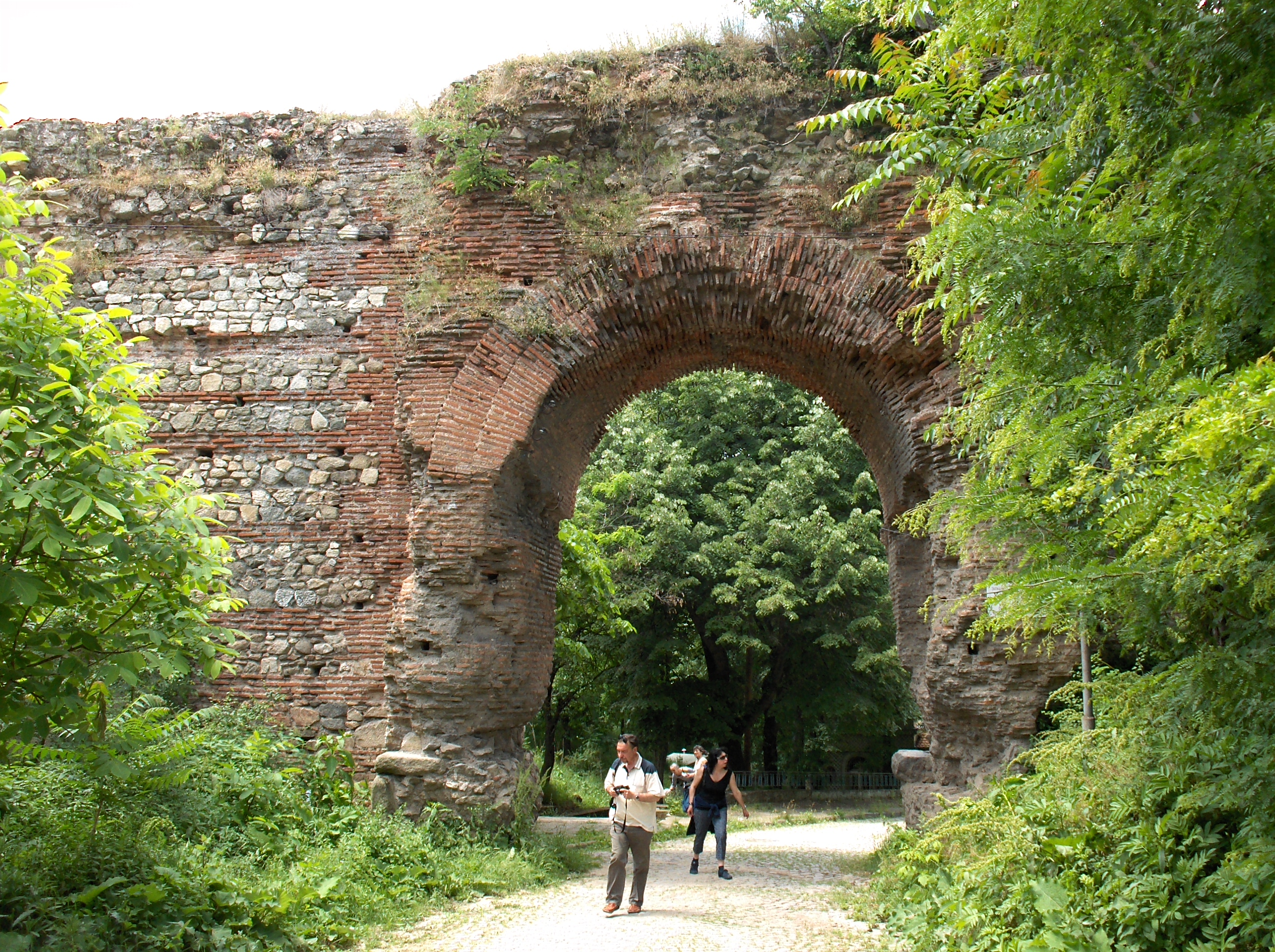
The West Gate

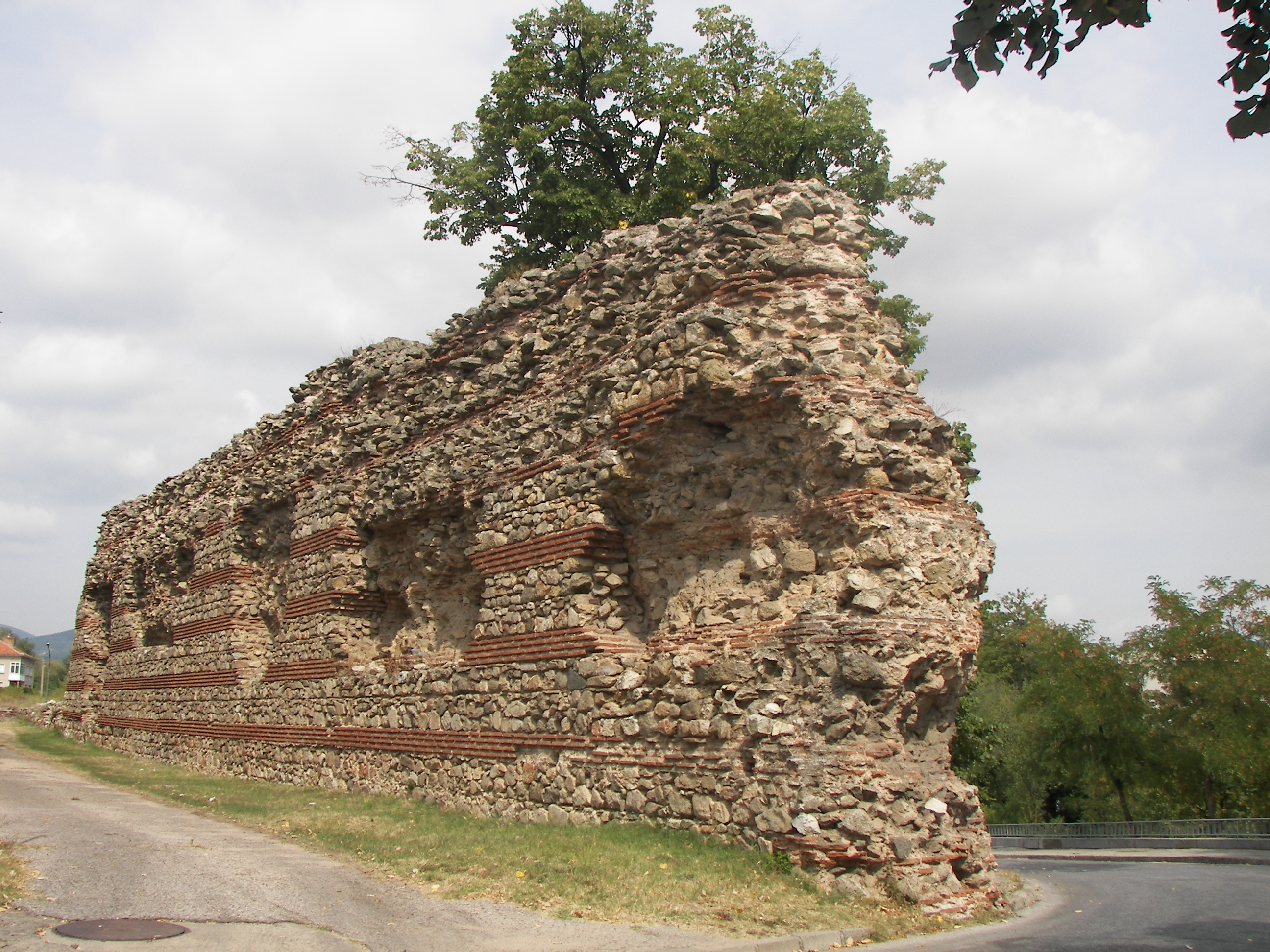
The Roman walls

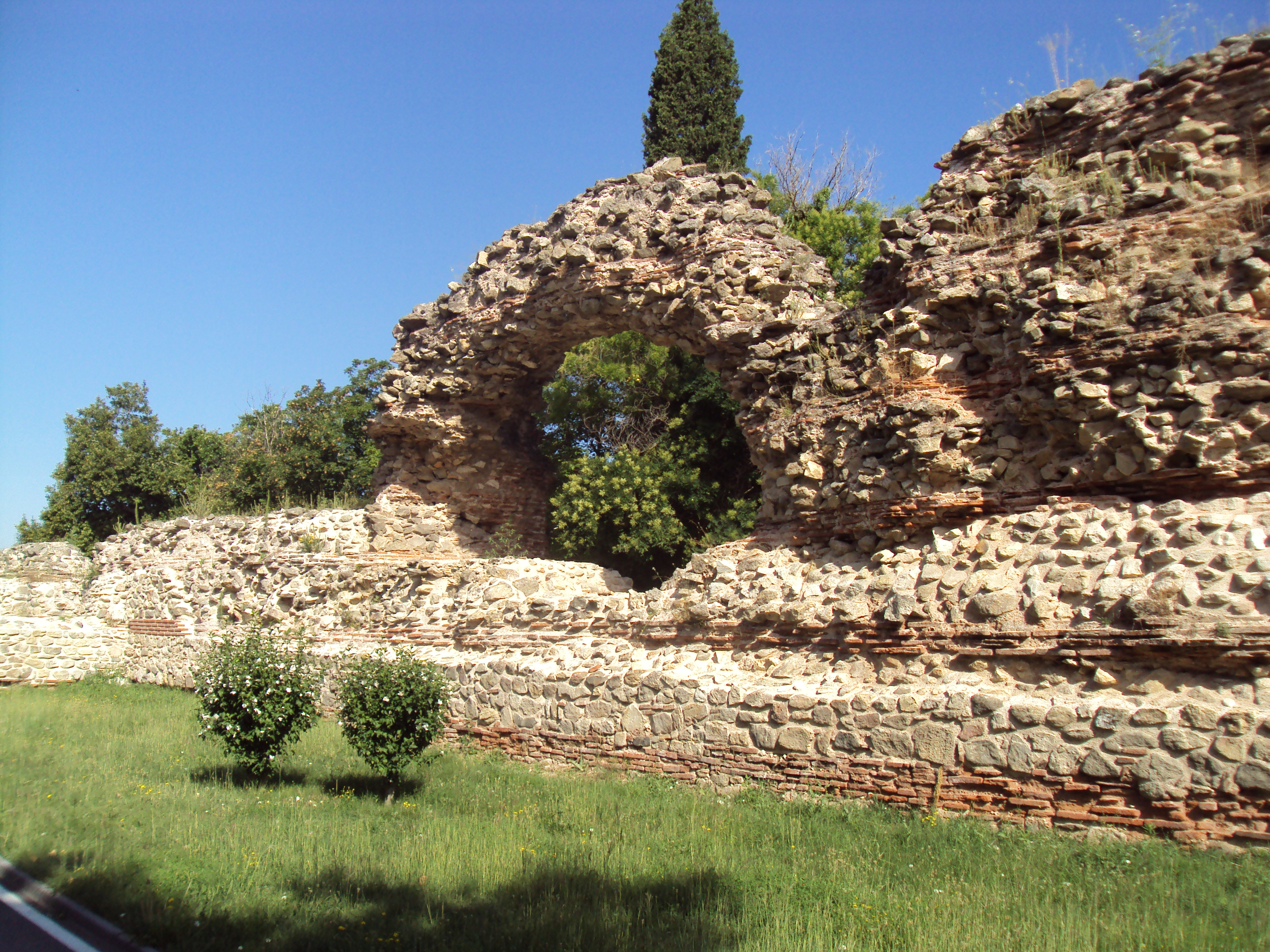
The Roman walls
