= Dolna Kremena =

Village located in Mezdra Municipality, within Bulgaria's Vratsa Province

Coordinates: 43°10′N 23°44′E

Dolna Kremena is a village located in Mezdra Municipality, within Bulgaria's Vratsa Province, and is located approximately 4 kilometers from the town of Mezdra. Places of interest include one medieval church, now in ruins, and one more recently constructed which contains a collection of Orthodox icons. The village has approximately 500 citizens, with an increasing Roma population.
