= Vasilev Peak =

Mountain in Antarctica

Coordinates: 62°55′23.0″S 62°25′37.3″W

Location of Smith Island in the South Shetland Islands.

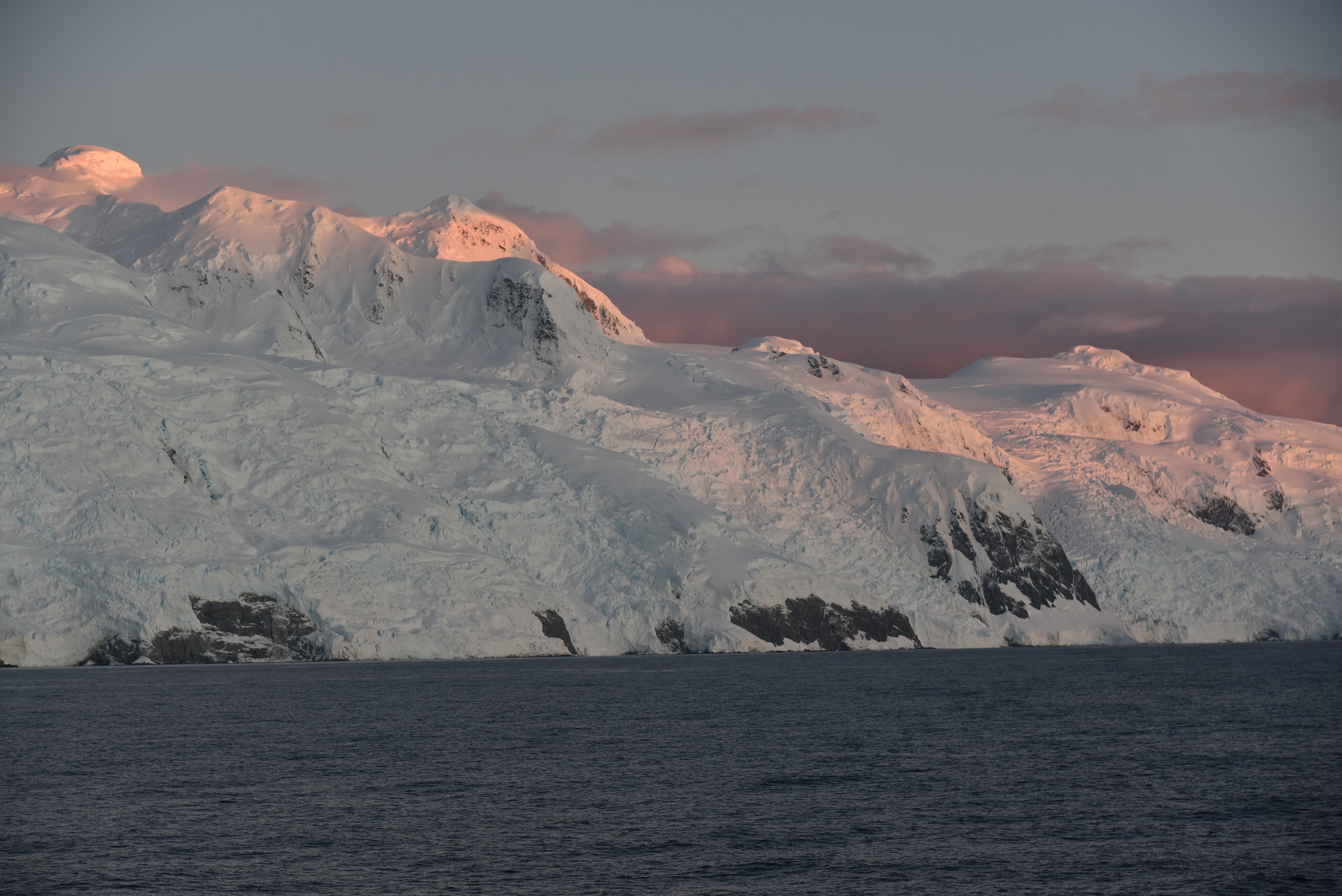
Northern Imeon Range, left to right Mount Pisgah, Mezek Peak, Vasilev Peak and Mount Christi

Topographic map of Smith Island

Vasilev Peak (Bulgarian: Василев връх, romanized: Vasilev vrah, IPA: [vaˈsilev vrɤx]) is an ice-covered peak rising to 1199 m in the northern part of Imeon Range on Smith Island in the South Shetland Islands, Antarctica. It is situated 2.65 km northeast of Mount Pisgah and 2 km southwest of Mount Christi, overlooking Dalgopol Glacier on the west, Kongur Glacier on the north and Nosei Glacier on the southeast.

The peak is named after the Bulgarian mountaineer, Antarctic explorer and cinematographer Doychin Vasilev (1944–2024), a participant in the Tangra 2004/05 topographic survey noted in 2012 by Discovery Channel, the Natural History Museum, the Royal Collection and the British Antarctic Survey as a timeline event in Antarctic exploration.

== Maps ==
- Chart of South Shetland including Coronation Island, &c. from the exploration of the sloop Dove in the years 1821 and 1822 by George Powell Commander of the same. Scale ca. 1:200000. London: Laurie, 1822.
- L.L. Ivanov. Antarctica: Livingston Island and Greenwich, Robert, Snow and Smith Islands. Scale 1:120000 topographic map. Troyan: Manfred Wörner Foundation, 2010. ISBN 978-954-92032-9-5 (First edition 2009. ISBN 978-954-92032-6-4)
- South Shetland Islands: Smith and Low Islands. Scale 1:150000 topographic map No. 13677. British Antarctic Survey, 2009.
- Antarctic Digital Database (ADD). Scale 1:250000 topographic map of Antarctica. Scientific Committee on Antarctic Research (SCAR). Since 1993, regularly upgraded and updated.
- L.L. Ivanov. Antarctica: Livingston Island and Smith Island. Scale 1:100000 topographic map. Manfred Wörner Foundation, 2017. ISBN 978-619-90008-3-0
