= Barlow Island =

Island in Antarctica

- Location of Smith Island in the South Shetland Islands

- Location within Antarctic Peninsula Location within Antarctica

Geography
- Location: Antarctica
- Coordinates: 62°52′04.5″S 62°20′24.2″W
- Archipelago: South Shetland Islands
- Area: 5.28 ha (13.0 acres)
- Length: 0.38 km (0.236 mi)
- Width: 0.16 km (0.099 mi)

Administration
- Administered under the Antarctic Treaty System

Demographics
- Population: Uninhabited

Topographic map of Smith Island.

Large scale map of Cape Smith area on Smith Island in the South Shetland Islands

Barlow Island is a small ice-free island off the north coast of Smith Island in the South Shetland Islands, Antarctica extending 380 by 160 m (420 by 170 yd), surface area 5.28 hectares (13 acres).

The feature's name, presumably honouring the British physicist and mathematician Peter Barlow (1776–1862), derives from the name 'Cape Barlow' originally applied in 1829 by the British naval expedition under Captain Henry Foster to some point on the east side of Smith Island.

== Location ==
The island is located at 62°52′04.5″S 62°20′24.2″W which is 2.14 km (1.33 mi) west-northwest of Cape Smith, 1.06 km (0.66 mi) west-northwest of Alfeus Island, 2.42 km (1.50 mi) north-northeast of Matochina Peak, 2.48 km (1.54 mi) northeast of Delyan Point and 11.33 km (7.04 mi) northeast of Gregory Point (British mapping in 1957, Chilean in 1962, Argentine in 1991, and Bulgarian in 2009).

== Maps ==
- Chart of South Shetland including Coronation Island, &c. from the exploration of the sloop Dove in the years 1821 and 1822 by George Powell Commander of the same. Scale ca. 1:200000. London: Laurie, 1822.
- L.L. Ivanov. Antarctica: Livingston Island and Greenwich, Robert, Snow and Smith Islands. Scale 1:120000 topographic map. Troyan: Manfred Wörner Foundation, 2010. ISBN 978-954-92032-9-5 (First edition 2009. ISBN 978-954-92032-6-4)
- South Shetland Islands: Smith and Low Islands. Scale 1:150000 topographic map No. 13677. British Antarctic Survey, 2009.
- Antarctic Digital Database (ADD). Scale 1:250000 topographic map of Antarctica. Scientific Committee on Antarctic Research (SCAR). Since 1993, regularly upgraded and updated.
- L.L. Ivanov. Antarctica: Livingston Island and Smith Island. Scale 1:100000 topographic map. Manfred Wörner Foundation, 2017. ISBN 978-619-90008-3-0
- A. Kamburov, L. Ivanov, N. Aleksandrova, V. Nikolova. Cape Smith, Smith Island, Antarctica. Scale 1:10000 topographic map. Manfred Wörner Foundation, 2026. ISBN 978-619-92883-2-0

== See also ==
- Composite Antarctic Gazetteer
- List of Antarctic islands south of 60° S
- SCAR
- Territorial claims in Antarctica
