= Varbak Point =

Ice-covered point in the South Shetland Islands, Antarctica

Location of Smith Island in the South Shetland Islands.

Topographic map of Smith Island.

Large scale map of Cape Smith area on Smith Island in the South Shetland Islands

Varbak Point (Bulgarian: нос Върбак, ‘Nos Varbak’ \'nos v&r-'bak\) is the ice-covered point on the southwest side of the entrance to Pakusha Cove on the southeast coast of Smith Island in the South Shetland Islands, Antarctica. The point is named after the settlement of Varbak in Northeastern Bulgaria.

== Location ==
Varbak Point is located at 62°56′24″S 62°22′35″W, which is 8.45 km southwest of Cape Smith, 8.5 km northeast of Sredets Point and 4.63 km east of Mount Pisgah. Bulgarian mapping in 2009 and 2010.

== Maps ==
- Chart of South Shetland including Coronation Island, &c. from the exploration of the sloop Dove in the years 1821 and 1822 by George Powell Commander of the same. Scale ca. 1:200000. London: Laurie, 1822.
- L.L. Ivanov. Antarctica: Livingston Island and Greenwich, Robert, Snow and Smith Islands. Scale 1:120000 topographic map. Troyan: Manfred Wörner Foundation, 2010. ISBN 978-954-92032-9-5 (First edition 2009. ISBN 978-954-92032-6-4)
- South Shetland Islands: Smith and Low Islands. Scale 1:150000 topographic map No. 13677. British Antarctic Survey, 2009.
- Antarctic Digital Database (ADD). Scale 1:250000 topographic map of Antarctica. Scientific Committee on Antarctic Research (SCAR). Since 1993, regularly upgraded and updated.
- L.L. Ivanov. Antarctica: Livingston Island and Smith Island. Scale 1:100000 topographic map. Manfred Wörner Foundation, 2017. ISBN 978-619-90008-3-0
- A. Kamburov, L. Ivanov, N. Aleksandrova, V. Nikolova. Cape Smith, Smith Island, Antarctica. Scale 1:10000 topographic map. Manfred Wörner Foundation, 2026. ISBN 978-619-92883-2-0
