= Razdel Point =

Ice-covered point in the South Shetland Islands, Antarctica

Location of Smith Island in the South Shetland Islands.

Topographic map of Smith Island.

Razdel Point (Bulgarian: нос Раздел, ‘Nos Razdel’ \'nos raz-'del\) is the ice-covered point on the southwest side of the entrance to Zapalnya Cove and northeast side of the entrance to Nikolov Cove on the southeast coast of Smith Island in the South Shetland Islands, Antarctica. The point is named after the settlements of Razdel in Northeastern and Southeastern Bulgaria.

== Location ==
Razdel Point is located at 62°57′53″S 62°24′38″W, which is 11.7 km southwest of Cape Smith, 5.26 km northeast of Sredets Point and 4.1 km southeast of Mount Pisgah. Bulgarian mapping in 2009 and 2017.

== Maps ==
- Chart of South Shetland including Coronation Island, &c. from the exploration of the sloop Dove in the years 1821 and 1822 by George Powell Commander of the same. Scale ca. 1:200000. London: Laurie, 1822.
- L.L. Ivanov. Antarctica: Livingston Island and Greenwich, Robert, Snow and Smith Islands. Scale 1:120000 topographic map. Troyan: Manfred Wörner Foundation, 2010. ISBN 978-954-92032-9-5 (First edition 2009. ISBN 978-954-92032-6-4)
- South Shetland Islands: Smith and Low Islands. Scale 1:150000 topographic map No. 13677. British Antarctic Survey, 2009.
- Antarctic Digital Database (ADD). Scale 1:250000 topographic map of Antarctica. Scientific Committee on Antarctic Research (SCAR). Since 1993, regularly upgraded and updated.
- L.L. Ivanov. Antarctica: Livingston Island and Smith Island. Scale 1:100000 topographic map. Manfred Wörner Foundation, 2017. ISBN 978-619-90008-3-0
