= Alfeus Island =

Island in Antarctica

- Topographic map of Smith Island

- Location within Antarctica Location within Antarctic Peninsula

Geography
- Location: Antarctica
- Coordinates: 62°52′12.4″S 62°18′53″W
- Archipelago: South Shetland Islands
- Length: 310 m (1020 ft)
- Width: 120 m (390 ft)

Administration
- Antarctica
- Administered under the Antarctic Treaty System

Demographics
- Population: uninhabited

Large scale map of Cape Smith area on Smith Island in the South Shetland Islands

Alfeus Island (Bulgarian: остров Алфеус, romanized: ostrov Alfeus, IPA: [ˈɔstrof ɐɫˈfɛos]) is the 310 m long in west-southwest to east-northeast direction and 120 m wide rocky island lying off the north coast of Smith Island in the South Shetland Islands, Antarctica.

The island is “named after the ocean fishing trawler Alfeus of the Bulgarian company Ocean Fisheries – Burgas whose ships operated in the waters of South Georgia, Kerguelen, the South Orkney Islands, South Shetland Islands and Antarctic Peninsula from 1970 to the early 1990s. The Bulgarian fishermen, along with those of the Soviet Union, Poland and East Germany are the pioneers of modern Antarctic fishing industry.”

== Location ==
Alfeus Island is located at 62°52′12.4″S 62°18′53″W, which is 660 m northwest of Cape Smith, 3.7 km east-northeast of Delyan Point and 1.06 km east-southeast of Barlow Island. Bulgarian mapping in 2018.

== Maps ==
- L.L. Ivanov. Antarctica: Livingston Island and Smith Island. Scale 1:100000 topographic map. Manfred Wörner Foundation, 2017; updated 2018.
- Antarctic Digital Database (ADD). Scale 1:250000 topographic map of Antarctica. Scientific Committee on Antarctic Research (SCAR). Since 1993, regularly upgraded and updated.
- A. Kamburov, L. Ivanov, N. Aleksandrova, V. Nikolova. Cape Smith, Smith Island, Antarctica. Scale 1:10000 topographic map. Manfred Wörner Foundation, 2026. ISBN 978-619-92883-2-0
