= Ritya Glacier =

Glacier in Antarctica

- Location of Smith Island in the South Shetland Islands

- Location within South Shetland Islands Location within Antarctica
- Location: Smith Island; South Shetland Islands
- Coordinates: 62°55′15″S 62°22′30″W
- Length: 1 nautical mile (1.9 km; 1.2 mi)
- Width: 0.8 nautical miles (1.5 km; 0.92 mi)
- Thickness: unknown
- Terminus: Linevo Cove
- Status: unknown

Topographic map of Smith Island

Large scale map of Cape Smith area on Smith Island in the South Shetland Islands

Ritya Glacier (Bulgarian: ледник Ритя, romanized: lednik Ritya, IPA: [ˈlɛdnik ˈritʲɐ]) is the steep 1.8 km long and 1.4 km wide glacier draining the southeast slopes of Imeon Range on Smith Island in the South Shetland Islands, Antarctica. It is situated northeast of Nosei Glacier, southeast of Kongur Glacier and south of Saparevo Glacier, flows southeastwards from Mount Christi and enters the head of Linevo Cove on Boyd Strait.

The glacier is named after the settlement of Ritya in Northern Bulgaria.

== Location ==
Ritya Glacier is centred at 62°55′15″S 62°22′30″W. Bulgarian mapping in 2009 and 2017.

== See also ==
- List of glaciers in the Antarctic
- Glaciology

== Maps ==
- Chart of South Shetland including Coronation Island, &c. from the exploration of the sloop Dove in the years 1821 and 1822 by George Powell Commander of the same. Scale ca. 1:200000. London: Laurie, 1822.
- L.L. Ivanov. Antarctica: Livingston Island and Greenwich, Robert, Snow and Smith Islands. Scale 1:120000 topographic map. Troyan: Manfred Wörner Foundation, 2010. ISBN 978-954-92032-9-5 (First edition 2009. ISBN 978-954-92032-6-4)
- South Shetland Islands: Smith and Low Islands. Scale 1:150000 topographic map No. 13677. British Antarctic Survey, 2009.
- Antarctic Digital Database (ADD). Scale 1:250000 topographic map of Antarctica. Scientific Committee on Antarctic Research (SCAR). Since 1993, regularly upgraded and updated.
- L.L. Ivanov. Antarctica: Livingston Island and Smith Island. Scale 1:100000 topographic map. Manfred Wörner Foundation, 2017. ISBN 978-619-90008-3-0
- A. Kamburov, L. Ivanov, N. Aleksandrova, V. Nikolova. Cape Smith, Smith Island, Antarctica. Scale 1:10000 topographic map. Manfred Wörner Foundation, 2026. ISBN 978-619-92883-2-0
