= Sevlievski Peak =

Mountain in South Shetland Islands, Antarctica

Coordinates: 62°57′40.3″S 62°29′13″W

Location of Smith Island in the South Shetland Islands.

Topographic map of Smith Island.

Sevlievski Peak (Bulgarian: Севлиевски връх, romanized: Sevlievski vrah, IPA: [sɛˈvliɛfski ˈvrɤx]) is the ice-covered peak rising to 1740 m in Imeon Range on Smith Island, South Shetland Islands. Situated 1 km south of Drinov Peak and 890 m north by east of Slatina Peak. Linked to Drinov Peak by Popovo Saddle. Overlooking Ovech Glacier to the east and Chuprene Glacier to the southwest. Bulgarian early mapping in 2009. Named after Miroslav Sevlievski (b. 1965), participant in the 2002/03 Bulgarian Antarctic expedition, for his support for the Bulgarian Antarctic programme.

== Maps ==
- Chart of South Shetland including Coronation Island, &c. from the exploration of the sloop Dove in the years 1821 and 1822 by George Powell Commander of the same. Scale ca. 1:200000. London: Laurie, 1822.
- L.L. Ivanov. Antarctica: Livingston Island and Greenwich, Robert, Snow and Smith Islands. Scale 1:120000 topographic map. Troyan: Manfred Wörner Foundation, 2010. ISBN 978-954-92032-9-5 (First edition 2009. ISBN 978-954-92032-6-4)
- South Shetland Islands: Smith and Low Islands. Scale 1:150000 topographic map No. 13677. British Antarctic Survey, 2009.
- Antarctic Digital Database (ADD). Scale 1:250000 topographic map of Antarctica. Scientific Committee on Antarctic Research (SCAR). Since 1993, regularly upgraded and updated.
- L.L. Ivanov. Antarctica: Livingston Island and Smith Island. Scale 1:100000 topographic map. Manfred Wörner Foundation, 2017. ISBN 978-619-90008-3-0
