= Kostenets Saddle =

Saddle in the South Shetland Islands, Antarctica

Location of Smith Island in the South Shetland Islands.

Topographic map of Smith Island.

Kostenets Saddle (Bulgarian: Костенечка седловина, ‘Kostenechka Sedlovina’ \'ko-ste-nech-ka se-dlo-vi-'na\) is the saddle of elevation 1302 m in Imeon Range on Smith Island in the South Shetland Islands, Antarctica bounded by Mount Pisgah to the north and the east ridge of Drinov Peak to the south. It overlooks the head of Vetrino Glacier to the west.

The saddle is named after the town of Kostenets in southwestern Bulgaria.

== Location ==
Kostenets Saddle is located at 62°56′49″S 62°28′07″W. Bulgarian mapping in 2009 and 2010.

== Maps ==
- Chart of South Shetland including Coronation Island, &c. from the exploration of the sloop Dove in the years 1821 and 1822 by George Powell Commander of the same. Scale ca. 1:200000. London: Laurie, 1822.
- L.L. Ivanov. Antarctica: Livingston Island and Greenwich, Robert, Snow and Smith Islands. Scale 1:120000 topographic map. Troyan: Manfred Wörner Foundation, 2010. ISBN 978-954-92032-9-5 (First edition 2009. ISBN 978-954-92032-6-4)
- South Shetland Islands: Smith and Low Islands. Scale 1:150000 topographic map No. 13677. British Antarctic Survey, 2009.
- Antarctic Digital Database (ADD). Scale 1:250000 topographic map of Antarctica. Scientific Committee on Antarctic Research (SCAR). Since 1993, regularly upgraded and updated.
- L.L. Ivanov. Antarctica: Livingston Island and Smith Island. Scale 1:100000 topographic map. Manfred Wörner Foundation, 2017. ISBN 978-619-90008-3-0
