= Popovo Saddle =

Location of Smith Island in the South Shetland Islands.

Topographic map of Smith Island.

Popovo Saddle (Bulgarian: Поповска седловина, ‘Popovska Sedlovina’ \'po-pov-ska se-dlo-vi-'na\) is the saddle of elevation 1550 m in Imeon Range on Smith Island in the South Shetland Islands, Antarctica bounded by Drinov Peak to the north and Sevlievski Peak to the south. Overlooking Ovech Glacier to the east and Chuprene Glacier to the southwest.

The saddle is named after the town of Popovo in northeastern Bulgaria.

== Location ==
Popovo Saddle is located at 62°57′34″S 62°29′24″W. Bulgarian mapping in 2009.

== Maps ==
- Chart of South Shetland including Coronation Island, &c. from the exploration of the sloop Dove in the years 1821 and 1822 by George Powell Commander of the same. Scale ca. 1:200000. London: Laurie, 1822.
- L.L. Ivanov. Antarctica: Livingston Island and Greenwich, Robert, Snow and Smith Islands. Scale 1:120000 topographic map. Troyan: Manfred Wörner Foundation, 2010. ISBN 978-954-92032-9-5 (First edition 2009. ISBN 978-954-92032-6-4)
- South Shetland Islands: Smith and Low Islands. Scale 1:150000 topographic map No. 13677. British Antarctic Survey, 2009.
- Antarctic Digital Database (ADD). Scale 1:250000 topographic map of Antarctica. Scientific Committee on Antarctic Research (SCAR). Since 1993, regularly upgraded and updated.
- L.L. Ivanov. Antarctica: Livingston Island and Smith Island. Scale 1:100000 topographic map. Manfred Wörner Foundation, 2017. ISBN 978-619-90008-3-0
