= Zapalnya Cove =

Cove in the South Shetland Islands, Antarctica

Location of Smith Island in the South Shetland Islands.

Topographic map of Smith Island.

Zapalnya Cove (Bulgarian: залив Запалня, ‘Zaliv Zapalnya’ \'za-liv za-'pal-nya\) is the 1.37 km wide cove on Boyd Strait indenting for 550 m the southeast coast of Smith Island in the South Shetland Islands, Antarctica, and entered northeast of Razdel Point and southwest of Medovene Point.

The cove is named after the historical settlement of Zapalnya in Southern Bulgaria.

== Location ==
Zapalnya Cove is located at 62°57′27″S 62°24′30″W, which is 10.9 km southwest of Cape Smith. Bulgarian mapping in 2009 and 2017.

== Maps ==
- Chart of South Shetland including Coronation Island, &c. from the exploration of the sloop Dove in the years 1821 and 1822 by George Powell Commander of the same. Scale ca. 1:200000. London: Laurie, 1822.
- L.L. Ivanov. Antarctica: Livingston Island and Greenwich, Robert, Snow and Smith Islands. Scale 1:120000 topographic map. Troyan: Manfred Wörner Foundation, 2010. ISBN 978-954-92032-9-5 (First edition 2009. ISBN 978-954-92032-6-4)
- South Shetland Islands: Smith and Low Islands. Scale 1:150000 topographic map No. 13677. British Antarctic Survey, 2009.
- Antarctic Digital Database (ADD). Scale 1:250000 topographic map of Antarctica. Scientific Committee on Antarctic Research (SCAR). Since 1993, regularly upgraded and updated.
- L.L. Ivanov. Antarctica: Livingston Island and Smith Island. Scale 1:100000 topographic map. Manfred Wörner Foundation, 2017. ISBN 978-619-90008-3-0
