= Cabut =

Cabut may refer to:

- Cabut Cove, a 1.08 km wide cove indenting for 1 km the northwest coast of Smith Island in the South Shetland Islands, Antarctica
- Emmanuel Cabut (1963-2010), the real name of French singer Mano Solo, son of Jean Cabut
- Jean Cabut (1938-2015), the real name of French comic strip artist and caricaturist Cabu
