= Nikolov Cove =

Cove in the South Shetland Islands, Antarctica

Location of Smith Island in the South Shetland Islands.

Topographic map of Smith Island.

Nikolov Cove (Bulgarian: Николов залив, ‘Nikolov Zaliv’ \ni-'ko-lov 'za-liv\) is the 950 m wide cove on Boyd Strait indenting for 500 m the southeast coast of Smith Island in the South Shetland Islands, Antarctica, and entered northeast of Velikan Point and southwest of Razdel Point. Its head is fed by Ovech Glacier.

The cove is named after Todor Nikolov for his support for the First Bulgarian Antarctic Expedition.

== Location ==
Nikolov Cove is located at 62°58′00″S 62°25′10″W, which is 12 km southwest of Cape Smith. Bulgarian mapping in 2009 and 2010.

== Maps ==
- Chart of South Shetland including Coronation Island, &c. from the exploration of the sloop Dove in the years 1821 and 1822 by George Powell Commander of the same. Scale ca. 1:200000. London: Laurie, 1822.
- L.L. Ivanov. Antarctica: Livingston Island and Greenwich, Robert, Snow and Smith Islands. Scale 1:120000 topographic map. Troyan: Manfred Wörner Foundation, 2010. ISBN 978-954-92032-9-5 (First edition 2009. ISBN 978-954-92032-6-4)
- South Shetland Islands: Smith and Low Islands. Scale 1:150000 topographic map No. 13677. British Antarctic Survey, 2009.
- Antarctic Digital Database (ADD). Scale 1:250000 topographic map of Antarctica. Scientific Committee on Antarctic Research (SCAR). Since 1993, regularly upgraded and updated.
- L.L. Ivanov. Antarctica: Livingston Island and Smith Island. Scale 1:100000 topographic map. Manfred Wörner Foundation, 2017. ISBN 978-619-90008-3-0
