= Mezek Fortress =

Medieval stronghold

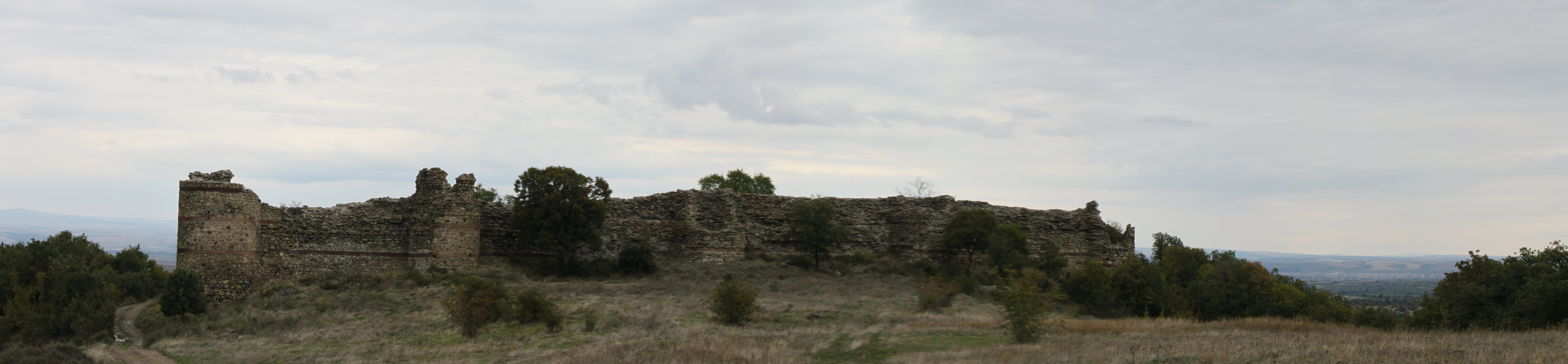
- Mezek Fortress

- Location within Bulgaria

General information
- Architectural style: Fortress
- Location: Mezek, Bulgaria
- Coordinates: 41°44′14″N 26°5′1″E
- Construction started: 11th century

Mezek Fortress (Bulgarian: Мезешка крепост) is a medieval stronghold constructed in the 11th and 12th centuries west of the modern village of Mezek, southeastern Bulgaria. It has been identified as the medieval Neoutzikon (Неузетикон in Bulgarian, Νεούτζικον in Byzantine Greek), mentioned in Byzantine chronicles. The structure is perched on an elongated terrace at the foothills of the most northeastern ridge of the Rhodope Mountains known as Gorata or St Marina. It functioned as a border guard fortress defending the lands between the rivers Maritsa and Arda. The fortress was controlled by the Byzantine and the Bulgarian Empires until it was conquered by the Ottoman Turks in the second half of the 14th century.

Mezek Fortress is among the 100 Tourist Sites of Bulgaria of the Bulgarian Tourist Union and is considered the best preserved fort in the eastern Rhodope Mountains. Some 600 m east of the structure is located the Mezek Tomb, the largest Thracian beehive tomb in Bulgaria.

== Location and status ==
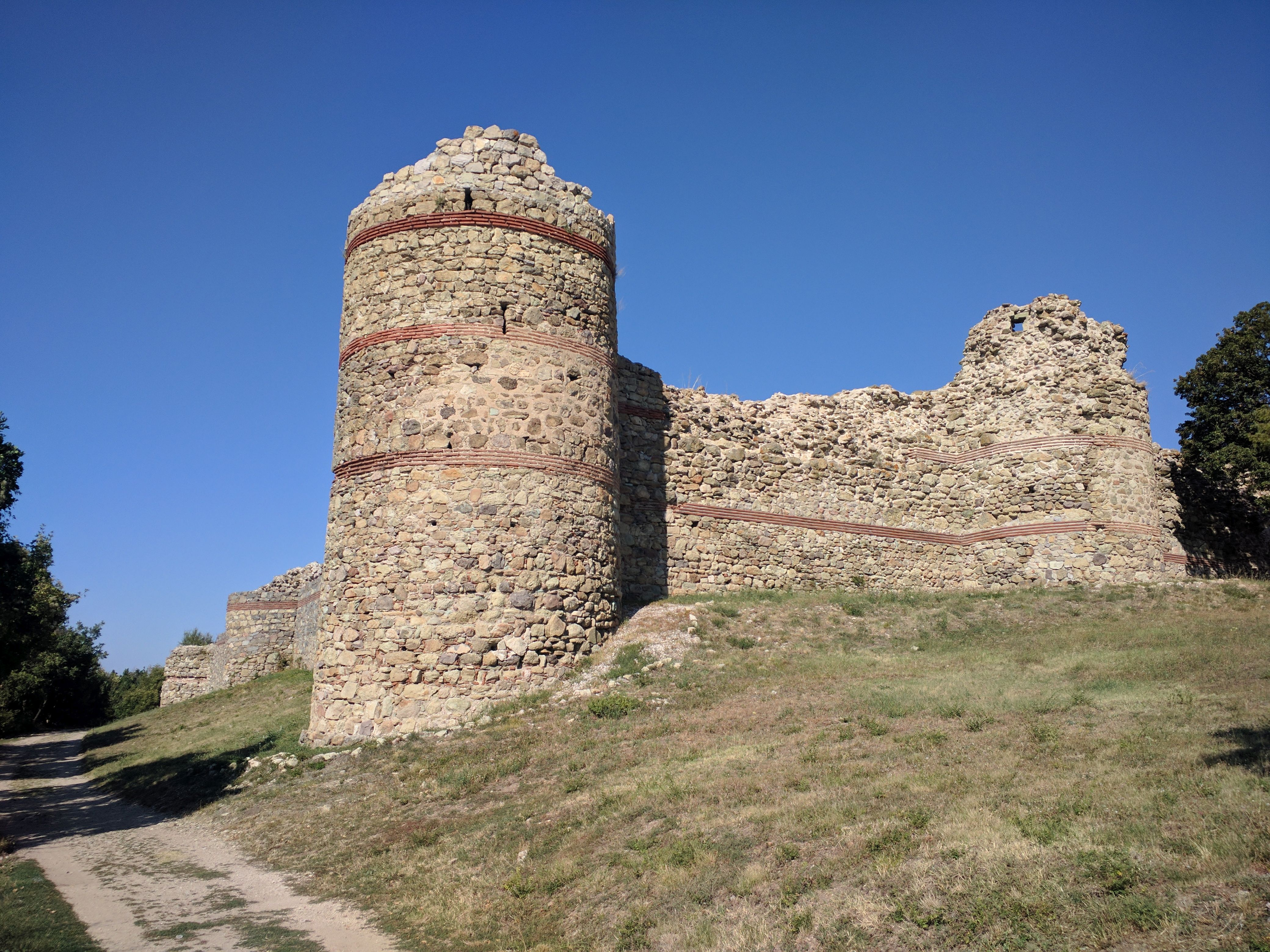
Southwestern corner of the fortress

Mezek Fortress is situated at an altitude of 210 m next to the homonymous village in Svilengrad Municipality of Haskovo Province, southeastern Bulgaria. It lies some 6 km southwest of the municipal center Svilengrad and one kilometer north of the Bulgaria–Greece border. It is easily accessible via the Maritsa motorway, the first class I-8 road and the second class II-80 road and can be reached via a road in the western part of Mezek leading to the nearby summit of Sheynovets, where the first action in the 1912 First Balkan War was fought.

It is part of the Kaleto Natural Landmark declared in 1976 to protect the rock formations and the fortress.

The fortress was declared national antiquity in 1927 and an architectural monument in 1968. Restoration and conservation activities were carried out in 1973 and 2007. There is a tourist information center, offering information and brochures.

== Description ==
Mezek Fortress encloses an area of 7 decares in the shape of an irregular quadrangle measuring 110/60 m. The walls are constructed of rubble stone joined with white mortar and decorated with three brick belts on the outside. Walls were crowned with battlements, which were preserved until 1900. The northern fortress walls are the most damaged, preserved to the ground level from the interior of the fortress. The south, west, and east sides are well-conserved to the height of the platform above which the battlements rose. The fortress walls are 1.90 to 2.50 m thick. The entrance is on the western wall, at its northern end. It is formed in a deep recess in the wall and is protected by a tower.

There are nine round towers, which protrude more than half of their diameter beyond the walls and reach a height of over 10 m. Five of the towers are located on the most vulnerable south wall, of them two in the corners and three on the front. Two of the towers are on the west wall, in the middle and at the main entrance. The north and east walls have one tower each. The tower, located at the southwest corner of the fortress, is the best preserved and the largest. It had three floors, the upper two with battlements. The floors were open to the interior of the fortress so that they had a circular fire range and could be defended even when the enemy penetrated the fortification.

== History ==
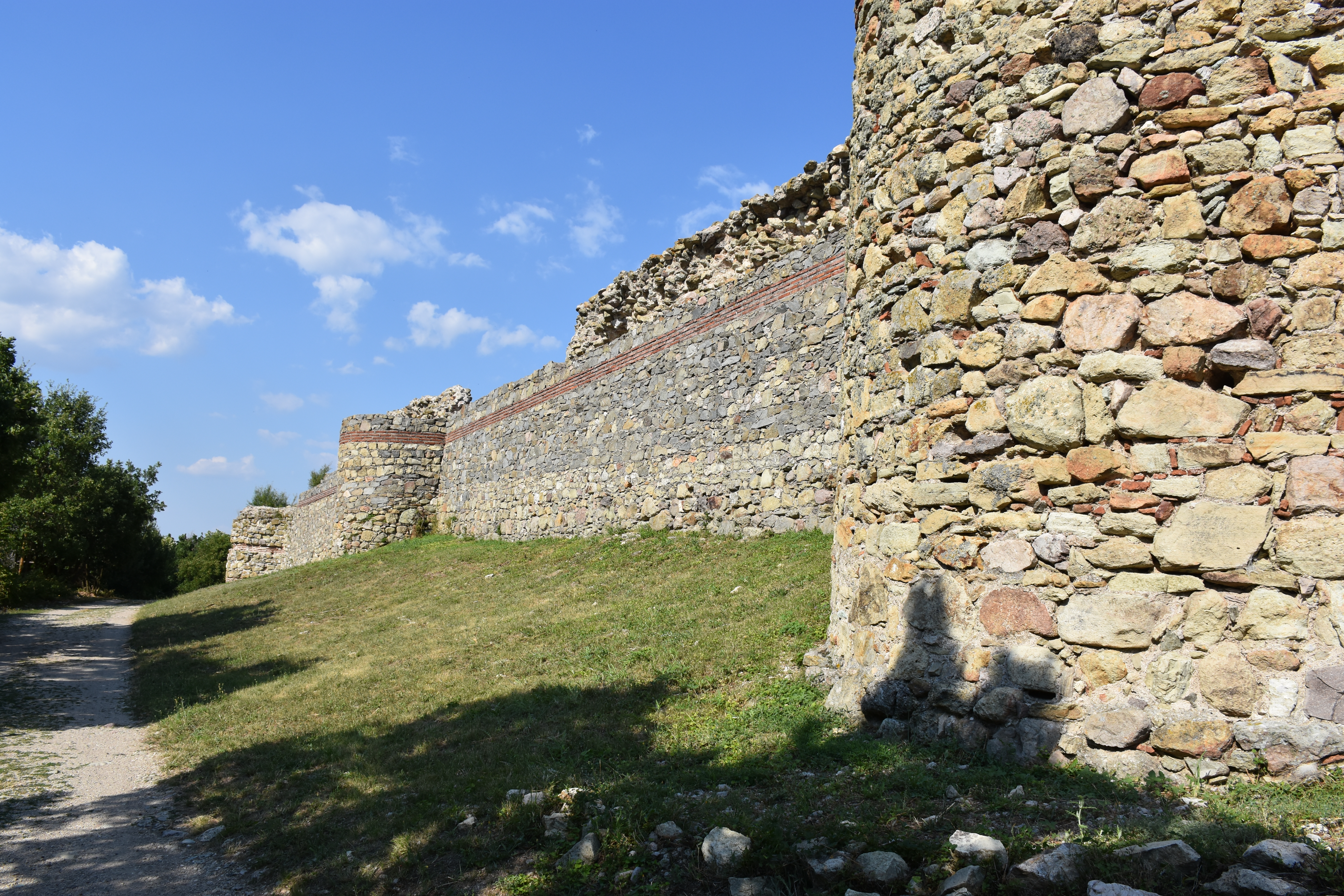
South walls

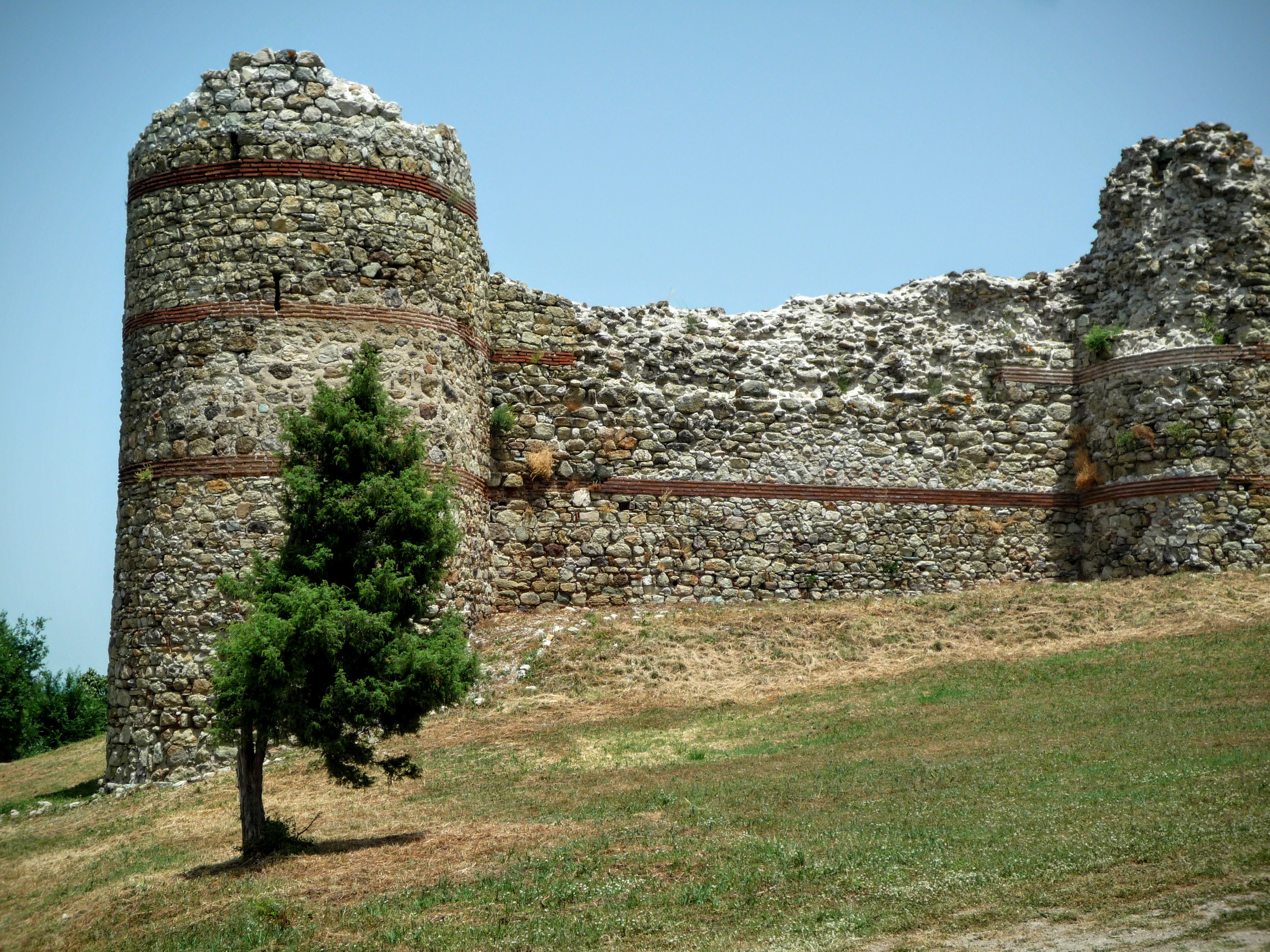
West walls

Neoutzikon was mentioned by Byzantine chronicler Niketas Choniates as the place where the Byzantine emperor Isaac II Angelos quelled the rebellion of his cousin Constantine Angelos Doukas in 1193. Doukas had been appointed governor of Philipoppolis and fought with success against the Bulgarian Uprising of Asen and Peter, which led to the re-establishment of the Bulgarian Empire. In 1193 Doukas declared himself emperor and marched on Constantinople but before reaching Adrianople he was betrayed at captured by his own men at Neoutzikon, that was situated on the border between the dioceses of Philippopolis and Adrianople. According to Choniates, this deed greatly encouraged the Bulgarian rebels, who had feared Constantine's ability and much preferred the ineffective Isaac II to remain on the throne, if possible, forever.

The battlements of the fortress were intact until 1900, when part of the structure was demolished by the Ottomans in order to reuse the stones for the construction of barracks in Svilengrad.

== Research and conservation ==
In the 19th century, historian Konstantin Jireček identified the ruins near the village of Mezek with the Fortress of Neoutzikon. The first archaeological research of the fortress was carried out in the 1930s by architect Aleksandar Rashenov, who performed excavations, documentation of the fortification system and small-scale studies of the interior. Rashenov documented the architectural monument with a detailed description, drawing and photos.

Conservation and restoration works on the walls were completed in 1963 and 1973. In 1983, more extensive archaeological excavations were carried out that clarified the fortress plan, the defense system and the dating. No medieval materials earlier than the 11th century were discovered. There were numerous ceramics pieces from the 13th and 14th centuries. Based on the data, the construction of the fortress was dated to the end of the 11th and the beginning of the 12th century, probably during the reign of Byzantine emperor Alexios I Komnenos. The stronghold was in operation until the fall of the area under Ottoman rule. Many ceramic vessels fragments, stone millstones and other household items were found. Two granaries with charred wheat were also discovered.
