= Constantine Angelos Doukas =

- Usurper of the Byzantine Empire
- Reign: 1192/93
- Predecessor: Isaac II Angelos
- Successor: Isaac II Angelos
- Born: c. 1170
- Died: after 1192/93
- Dynasty: Angelid dynasty
- Father: Isaac Angelos Doukas
- Mother: Unknown

Constantine Angelos Doukas, Latinized as Angelus Ducas (Greek: Κωνσταντίνος Ἂγγελος Δούκας, romanized: Kōnstantinos Angelos Doukas), was a usurper who attempted to overthrow his cousin, the Byzantine emperor Isaac II Angelos, in 1192/93.

== Career ==
Born c. 1170, Constantine Angelos Doukas was a son of Isaac Angelos Doukas, and hence a grandson of Constantine Angelos and first cousin of the Byzantine emperor Isaac II Angelos (r. 1185–1195, 1203–1204). The name or origin of his mother is unknown.

In 1192/93, Isaac II named him fleet commander (doux tou stolou) and governor of Philippopolis, an area then suffering from the ongoing Vlach–Bulgarian rebellion. The contemporary historian Niketas Choniates writes favourably of Constantine, noting that he was able to train his troops well and to command loyalty from them, and that although naturally impetuous "in the manner of lion cubs", he was also willing to listen and be restrained by the advice of the more experienced professionals placed under his command. Constantine was able to check the rebels' raids against the region of Philippopolis and Berrhoe, so that the rebels "cowered in fear of him and were more panic-stricken at the sight of him than of the emperor".

His success on the battlefield emboldened Constantine, however, and he started aiming to usurp the throne. He began sounding out his subordinate commanders and other men of prominent birth from the wider region, and had himself proclaimed emperor. Immediately he set out with his supporters for Adrianople, seat of his brother-in-law, the Grand Domestic of the West, Basil Vatatzes. Evidently trusting that Vatatzes would join him, Constantine sent ahead letters informing his brother-in-law of his actions. Vatatzes, however, rejected Constantine's actions as folly and refused to join him. The usurper reached Neoutzikon, at the border between the provinces of Philippopolis and Adrianople, but there his own supporters seized him and took him prisoner. Constantine's followers handed him over to the emperor, claiming that they had been pressured into supporting his usurpation against their will. Isaac II harboured his doubts about their sincerity, but chose to overlook their part in the failed uprising. In the end, only Constantine was punished, by being blinded. According to Choniates, this deed greatly encouraged the Bulgarian rebels, who had feared Constantine's ability and much preferred the ineffective Isaac II to remain on the throne, if possible, for ever. Constantine's subsequent fate, or whether he was married and had any offspring, is unknown.

== Sources ==
- Magoulias, Harry J., ed. (1984). O City of Byzantium: Annals of Niketas Choniatēs. Detroit: Wayne State University Press. ISBN 978-0-8143-1764-8.
- Varzos, Konstantinos (1984). Η Γενεαλογία των Κομνηνών [The Genealogy of the Komnenoi] (PDF) (in Greek). Vol. B. Thessaloniki: Centre for Byzantine Studies, University of Thessaloniki.
