= Cabut Cove =

Cove on Smith Island, South Shetland Islands, Antarctica

Location of Smith Island in the South Shetland Islands

Topographic map of Smith Island

Cabut Cove is the 1.08 km wide cove indenting for 1 km the northwest coast of Smith Island in the South Shetland Islands, Antarctica, and entered between Markeli Point and Jireček Point. Part of its coast is formed by the terminus of Yablanitsa Glacier. The feature's name is given by Argentina.

== Location ==
Cabut Cove is centred at 62°56′18.5″S 62°32′22″W which is 14.13 km southwest of Cape Smith and 19.82 km north-northeast of Cape James (Bulgarian mapping in 2009).

== Maps ==
- Chart of South Shetland including Coronation Island, &c. from the exploration of the sloop Dove in the years 1821 and 1822 by George Powell Commander of the same. Scale ca. 1:200000. London: Laurie, 1822.
- L.L. Ivanov. Antarctica: Livingston Island and Greenwich, Robert, Snow and Smith Islands. Scale 1:120000 topographic map. Troyan: Manfred Wörner Foundation, 2010. ISBN 978-954-92032-9-5 (First edition 2009. ISBN 978-954-92032-6-4)
- South Shetland Islands: Smith and Low Islands. Scale 1:150000 topographic map No. 13677. British Antarctic Survey, 2009.
- Antarctic Digital Database (ADD). Scale 1:250000 topographic map of Antarctica. Scientific Committee on Antarctic Research (SCAR). Since 1993, regularly upgraded and updated.
- L.L. Ivanov. Antarctica: Livingston Island and Smith Island. Scale 1:100000 topographic map. Manfred Wörner Foundation, 2017. ISBN 978-619-90008-3-0
