= Mezek Peak =

Sharp peak on Smith Island, South Shetland Islands

Coordinates: 62°56′19″S 62°26′47″W

Location of Smith Island in the South Shetland Islands.

Topographic map of Smith Island.

Mezek Peak (Bulgarian: връх Мезек, romanized: vrah Mezek, IPA: [ˈvrɤx mɛˈzɛk]) is a sharp peak rising to 1555 m in Imeon Range on Smith Island, South Shetland Islands. Situated 1.07 km east of Mount Pisgah and 4.02 km southwest by south of Mount Christi. Precipitous and predominantly ice-free east slopes. Overlooking Dalgopol Glacier to the northwest and Nosei Glacier to the east. Bulgarian early mapping in 2009. Named after the medieval fortress of Mezek in southeastern Bulgaria.

== Maps ==
- Chart of South Shetland including Coronation Island, &c. from the exploration of the sloop Dove in the years 1821 and 1822 by George Powell Commander of the same. Scale ca. 1:200000. London: Laurie, 1822.
- L.L. Ivanov. Antarctica: Livingston Island and Greenwich, Robert, Snow and Smith Islands. Scale 1:120000 topographic map. Troyan: Manfred Wörner Foundation, 2010. ISBN 978-954-92032-9-5 (First edition 2009. ISBN 978-954-92032-6-4)
- South Shetland Islands: Smith and Low Islands. Scale 1:150000 topographic map No. 13677. British Antarctic Survey, 2009.
- Antarctic Digital Database (ADD). Scale 1:250000 topographic map of Antarctica. Scientific Committee on Antarctic Research (SCAR). Since 1993, regularly upgraded and updated.
- L.L. Ivanov. Antarctica: Livingston Island and Smith Island. Scale 1:100000 topographic map. Manfred Wörner Foundation, 2017. ISBN 978-619-90008-3-0
