= Doychin Vasilev =

Bulgarian alpinist and cinematographer (1944–2024)

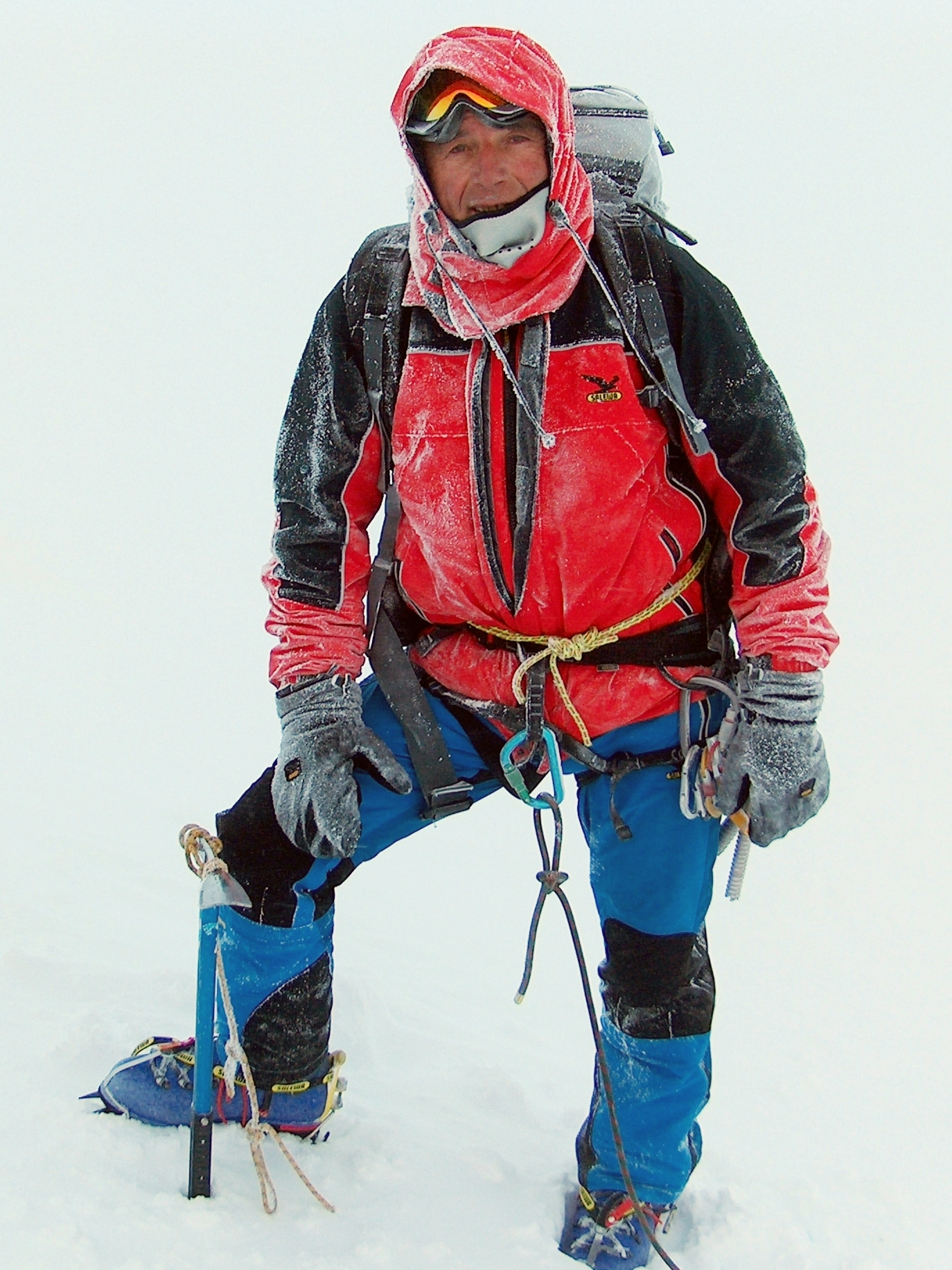
Doychin Vasilev

Doychin Vasilev (Bulgarian: Дойчин Василев, 12 June 1944 – 7 December 2024) was a Bulgarian mountaineer who climbed three Himalayan 8,000 m peaks: Dhaulagiri (in 1995), Mount Everest (1997) and Makalu (1998). His announced ascent of Cho Oyu on May 17, 1999 is controversial – he does not provide evidence, it has not been recognized by an independent source, and the number one chronicler of Himalayan climbs Elizabeth Hawley notes that on that date “due to worsening weather, no climber had crossed the 8,000m mark.” In 1999, while attempting to climb Shishapangma, Doychin Vassilev and Karina Salova reached the so-called Central/West Peak (8008 m), about two hours from the highest point, the Main Peak (8013 m).

President of Alpine Club Vihren, Sofia. Participant in the Bulgarian Antarctic expedition Tangra 2004/05, noted by Discovery Channel as a timeline event in Antarctic exploration. Vasilev Peak on Imeon Range, Smith Island in Antarctica is named after him.

Documentaries by Doychin Vasilev include Chomolungma (1997), Makalu (1998), Manaslu (1999), and White Dreams (2001).

Vasilev died on 7 December 2024, at the age of 80.
