= Ovech Glacier =

Glacier in South Shetland Islands

- Location of Smith Island in the South Shetland Islands

- Location within South Shetland Islands Location within Antarctica
- Location: Smith Island; South Shetland Islands
- Coordinates: 62°57′45″S 62°26′40″W
- Length: 2 nautical miles (3.7 km; 2.3 mi)
- Thickness: unknown
- Terminus: Nikolov Cove
- Status: unknown

Topographic map of Smith Island.

Ovech Glacier (Bulgarian: ледник Овеч, romanized: lednik Ovech, IPA: [ˈlɛdnik ˈɔvɛt͡ʃ]; 62°57′42″S 62°26′40″W) is a 3.5 km long glacier on Smith Island, South Shetland Islands draining the southeast slopes of Imeon Range southeast of Drinov Peak and east of Popovo Saddle and Sevlievski Peak. It is situated southeast of Vetrino Glacier and Yablanitsa Glacier, and northeast of Krivodol Glacier, and flows east-southeastward into Nikolov Cove on Boyd Strait. Bulgarian early mapping in 2009. The glacier is named after the medieval fortress of Ovech in northeastern Bulgaria.

== See also ==
- List of glaciers in the Antarctic
- Glaciology

== Maps ==
- Chart of South Shetland including Coronation Island, &c. from the exploration of the sloop Dove in the years 1821 and 1822 by George Powell Commander of the same. Scale ca. 1:200000. London: Laurie, 1822.
- L.L. Ivanov. Antarctica: Livingston Island and Greenwich, Robert, Snow and Smith Islands. Scale 1:120000 topographic map. Troyan: Manfred Wörner Foundation, 2010. ISBN 978-954-92032-9-5 (First edition 2009. ISBN 978-954-92032-6-4)
- South Shetland Islands: Smith and Low Islands. Scale 1:150000 topographic map No. 13677. British Antarctic Survey, 2009.
- Antarctic Digital Database (ADD). Scale 1:250000 topographic map of Antarctica. Scientific Committee on Antarctic Research (SCAR). Since 1993, regularly upgraded and updated.
- L.L. Ivanov. Antarctica: Livingston Island and Smith Island. Scale 1:100000 topographic map. Manfred Wörner Foundation, 2017. ISBN 978-619-90008-3-0
