= Yablanitsa Glacier =

Glacier in Antarctica

- Location of Smith Island in the South Shetland Islands

- Location within South Shetland Islands Location within Antarctica
- Location: Smith Island; South Shetland Islands
- Coordinates: 62°56′47″S 62°31′02″W
- Length: 1 nautical mile (1.9 km; 1.2 mi)
- Thickness: unknown
- Terminus: Cabut Cove
- Status: unknown

Topographic map of Smith Island.

Yablanitsa Glacier (Bulgarian: ледник Ябланица, romanized: lednik Yablanitsa, IPA: [ˈlɛdnik ˈjabɫɐnit͡sɐ]) is a 1.8 km long glacier on Smith Island in the South Shetland Islands, Antarctica. It is situated north-northeast of Chuprene Glacier, southwest of Vetrino Glacier and northwest of Ovech Glacier, and flows west of Drinov Peak into Cabut Cove. The feature is named after the town of Yablanitsa in northern Bulgaria.

== Location ==
The glacier's midpoint is located at 62°56′47″S 62°31′02″W (Bulgarian early mapping in 2009).

== See also ==
- List of glaciers in the Antarctic
- Glaciology

== Maps ==
- Chart of South Shetland including Coronation Island, &c. from the exploration of the sloop Dove in the years 1821 and 1822 by George Powell Commander of the same. Scale ca. 1:200000. London: Laurie, 1822.
- L.L. Ivanov. Antarctica: Livingston Island and Greenwich, Robert, Snow and Smith Islands. Scale 1:120000 topographic map. Troyan: Manfred Wörner Foundation, 2010. ISBN 978-954-92032-9-5 (First edition 2009. ISBN 978-954-92032-6-4)
- South Shetland Islands: Smith and Low Islands. Scale 1:150000 topographic map No. 13677. British Antarctic Survey, 2009.
- Antarctic Digital Database (ADD). Scale 1:250000 topographic map of Antarctica. Scientific Committee on Antarctic Research (SCAR). Since 1993, regularly upgraded and updated.
- L.L. Ivanov. Antarctica: Livingston Island and Smith Island. Scale 1:100000 topographic map. Manfred Wörner Foundation, 2017. ISBN 978-619-90008-3-0
