= Mezek =

Village in Haskovo, Bulgaria

Mezek Мезек
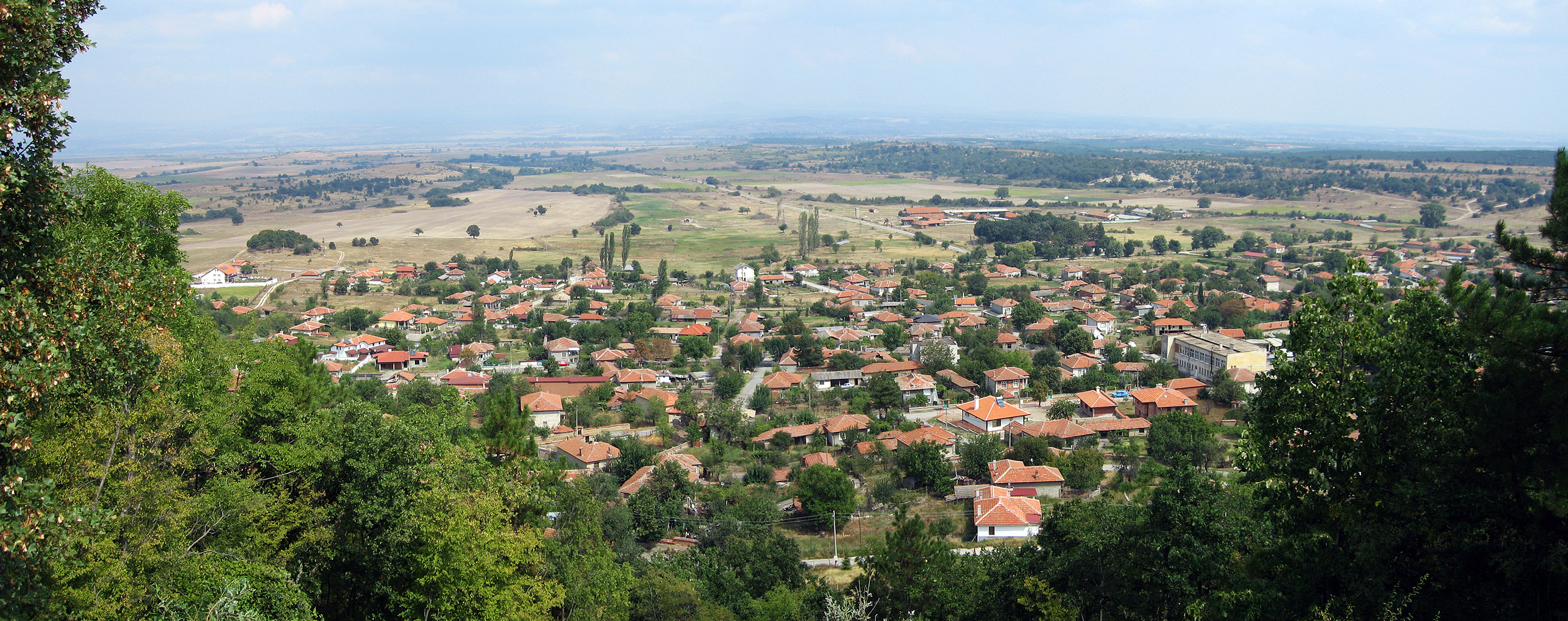
- Mezek seen from the fortress

- Location of Mezek
- Coordinates: 41°44′16″N 26°05′01″E
- Country: Bulgaria
- Provinces (Oblast): Haskovo

Government
  - Mayor: Veselina Teoharova
- Elevation: 167 m (548 ft)

Population (2009)
  - Total: 371
- Time zone: UTC+2 (EET)
  - Summer (DST): UTC+3 (EEST)
- Postal Code: 6521
- Area code: 03777

Mezek (Bulgarian: Мезек) is a village in southeastern Bulgaria, part of Svilengrad municipality, Haskovo Province. It lies at the foot of the eastern Rhodope Mountains, just north of the Bulgaria–Greece border and not far west of the Bulgaria–Turkey border. Mezek is famous for the well-preserved medieval Mezek Fortress (Neoutzikon - Νεούτζικον) and its two ancient Thracian beehive tombs, the Mezek and Sheynovets tombs. The village is also well known for its own winery and the Mezzek brand of Bulgarian wine.

== Fortress and Tomb ==
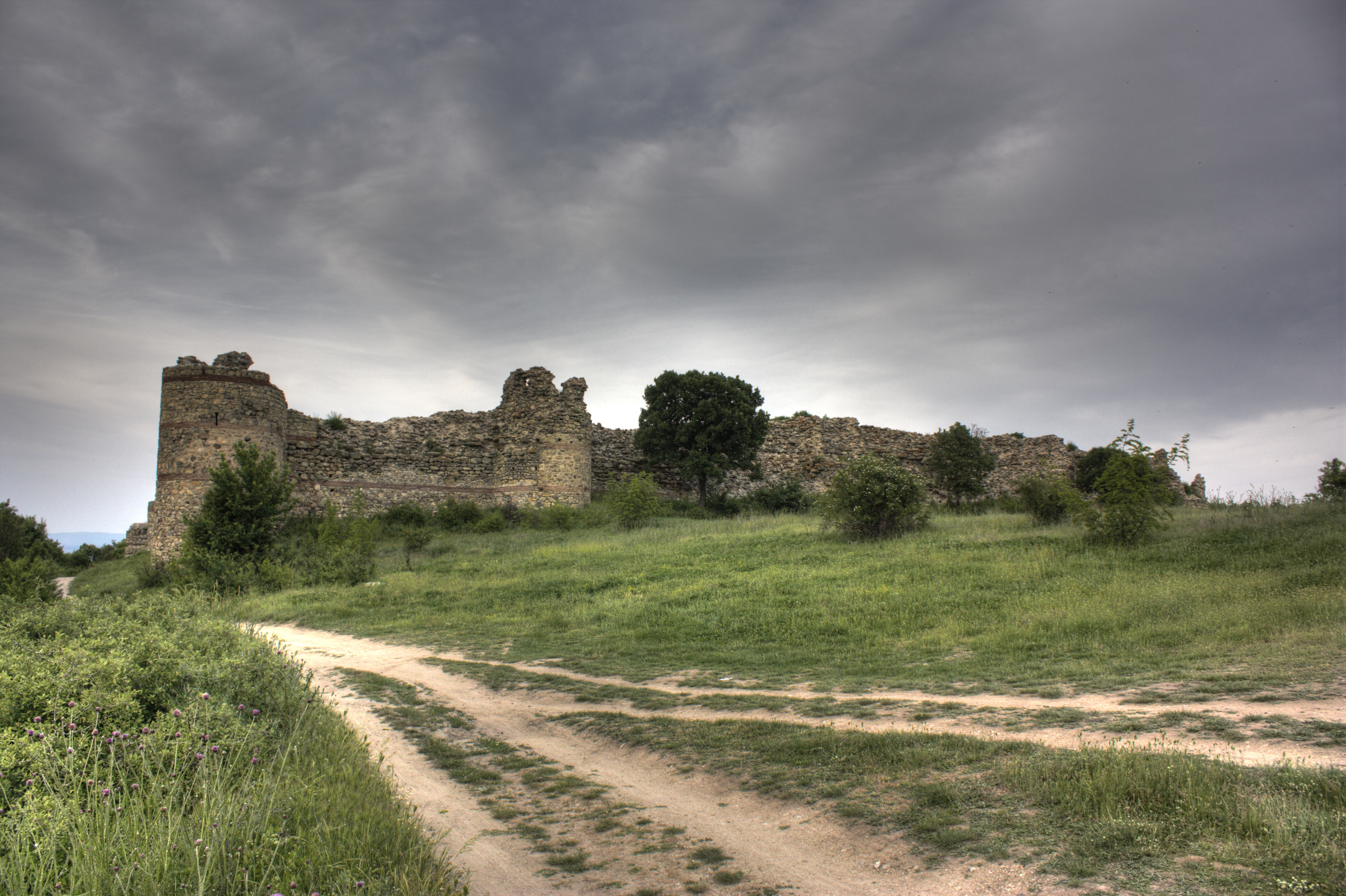
Mezek Fortress

The Mezek Fortress, 6.5 decares (6,500 square metres) in area, is claimed to be among the best preserved Bulgarian medieval castles. It dates to the 11th century. Along with the Thracian tombs, it was studied by a team under archaeologist Bogdan Filov in 1931–1932. The castle has nine towers, five of which lie at the vulnerable south wall. The Mezek Fortress was built out of stone, with two decorative lines of bricks on the outside. It suffered some destruction around 1900, when stones from the fortress were used for the construction of Ottoman barracks in Svilengrad.

The Mezek Thracian tomb dates to the 4th century BC. It is a large, elongated tomb that includes a covered passage of 20.65 metres (67.7 ft), two rectangular antechambers of different size and a round burial chamber with a stone sarcophagus. The number of burials of noble Thracians in the tomb was no less than four. Gold, silver, bronze, iron and glass items and pottery discovered in the tomb are today displayed in the National Archaeological Museum in Sofia.

== Nature ==
There is an eco-trail Sheynovets peak starting at the center of the village. It's 7 km in length and requires around 6 hours for a return trip.

Mezek Peak in Imeon Range on Smith Island in the South Shetland Islands, Antarctica is named after Mezek.
