= Matochina Peak =

Coordinates: 62°53′18″S 62°21′24″W

Location of Smith Island in the South Shetland Islands.

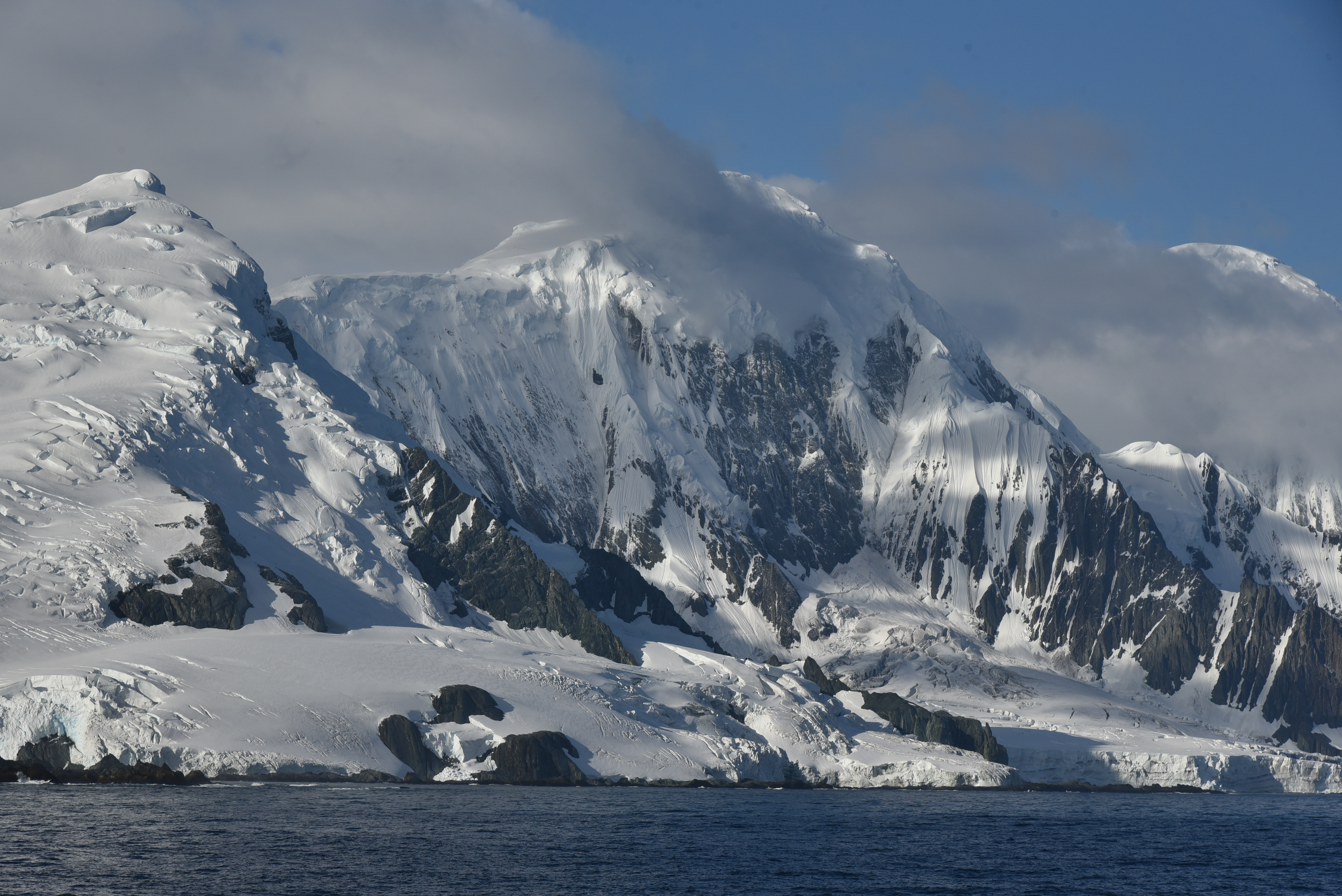
Northwest coast of Smith Island; left to right Matochina Peak, Mount Christi and Mount Pisgah

Topographic map of Smith Island.

Large scale map of Cape Smith area on Smith Island in the South Shetland Islands

Matochina Peak (Bulgarian: връх Маточина, romanized: vrah Matochina, IPA: [ˈvrɤx ˈmatot͡ʃinɐ]) is a peak rising to 784 m in the north extremity of Imeon Range on Smith Island in the South Shetland Islands, Antarctica. Situated 3.3 km west-southwest of Cape Smith and 3.2 km northeast of Mount Christi. Overlooking Saparevo Glacier to the west and southwest, Vedena Cove to the west and Glozhene Cove to the northeast. Bulgarian early mapping in 2009. Named after the settlement and medieval fortress of Matochina in southeastern Bulgaria.

== Maps ==
- Chart of South Shetland including Coronation Island, &c. from the exploration of the sloop Dove in the years 1821 and 1822 by George Powell Commander of the same. Scale ca. 1:200000. London: Laurie, 1822.
- L.L. Ivanov. Antarctica: Livingston Island and Greenwich, Robert, Snow and Smith Islands. Scale 1:120000 topographic map. Troyan: Manfred Wörner Foundation, 2010. ISBN 978-954-92032-9-5 (First edition 2009. ISBN 978-954-92032-6-4)
- South Shetland Islands: Smith and Low Islands. Scale 1:150000 topographic map No. 13677. British Antarctic Survey, 2009.
- Antarctic Digital Database (ADD). Scale 1:250000 topographic map of Antarctica. Scientific Committee on Antarctic Research (SCAR). Since 1993, regularly upgraded and updated.
- L.L. Ivanov. Antarctica: Livingston Island and Smith Island. Scale 1:100000 topographic map. Manfred Wörner Foundation, 2017. ISBN 978-619-90008-3-0
- A. Kamburov, L. Ivanov, N. Aleksandrova, V. Nikolova. Cape Smith, Smith Island, Antarctica. Scale 1:10000 topographic map. Manfred Wörner Foundation, 2026. ISBN 978-619-92883-2-0
