= Vedena Cove =

Cove in the South Shetland Islands, Antarctica

Location of Smith Island in the South Shetland Islands.

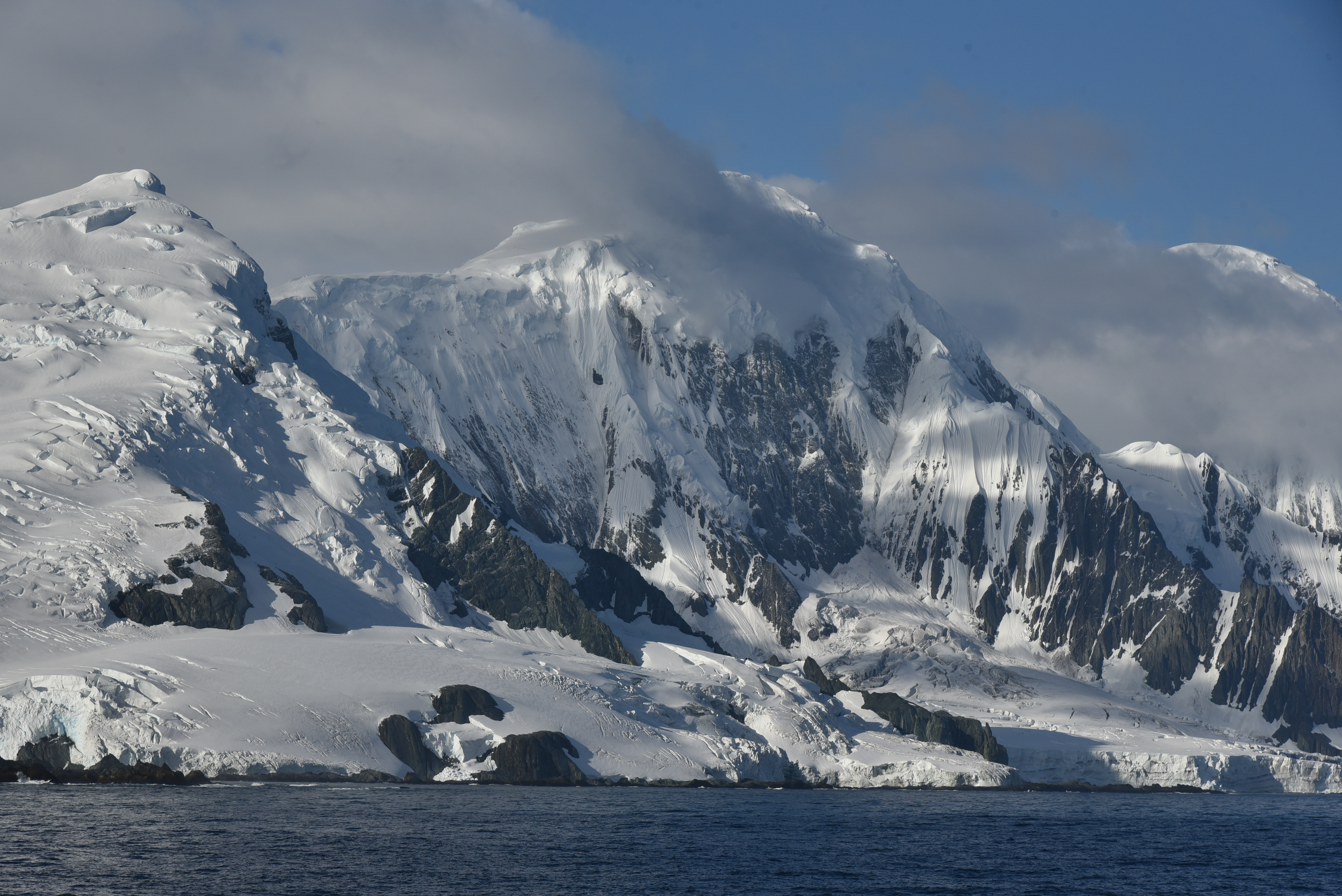
Northwest coast of Smith Island with Delyan Point, Vedena Cove and Saparevo Glacier in the right foreground

Topographic map of Smith Island.

Large scale map of Cape Smith area on Smith Island in the South Shetland Islands

Vedena Cove (Bulgarian: залив Ведена, romanized: zaliv Vedena, IPA: [ˈzaliv vɛˈdɛnɐ]) is the 1.73 km wide cove indenting for 560 m the northwest coast of Smith Island in the South Shetland Islands, Antarctica west of Delyan Point. Its head is fed by Saparevo Glacier. The feature is named after Vedena River in western Bulgaria.

== Location ==
The cove is centred at 62°53′09″S 62°23′10″W (Bulgarian early mapping in 2009).

== Maps ==
- Chart of South Shetland including Coronation Island, &c. from the exploration of the sloop Dove in the years 1821 and 1822 by George Powell Commander of the same. Scale ca. 1:200000. London: Laurie, 1822.
- L.L. Ivanov. Antarctica: Livingston Island and Greenwich, Robert, Snow and Smith Islands. Scale 1:120000 topographic map. Troyan: Manfred Wörner Foundation, 2010. ISBN 978-954-92032-9-5 (First edition 2009. ISBN 978-954-92032-6-4)
- South Shetland Islands: Smith and Low Islands. Scale 1:150000 topographic map No. 13677. British Antarctic Survey, 2009.
- Antarctic Digital Database (ADD). Scale 1:250000 topographic map of Antarctica. Scientific Committee on Antarctic Research (SCAR). Since 1993, regularly upgraded and updated.
- L.L. Ivanov. Antarctica: Livingston Island and Smith Island. Scale 1:100000 topographic map. Manfred Wörner Foundation, 2017. ISBN 978-619-90008-3-0
- A. Kamburov, L. Ivanov, N. Aleksandrova, V. Nikolova. Cape Smith, Smith Island, Antarctica. Scale 1:10000 topographic map. Manfred Wörner Foundation, 2026. ISBN 978-619-92883-2-0
