= Saparevo Glacier =

Glacier in Antarctica

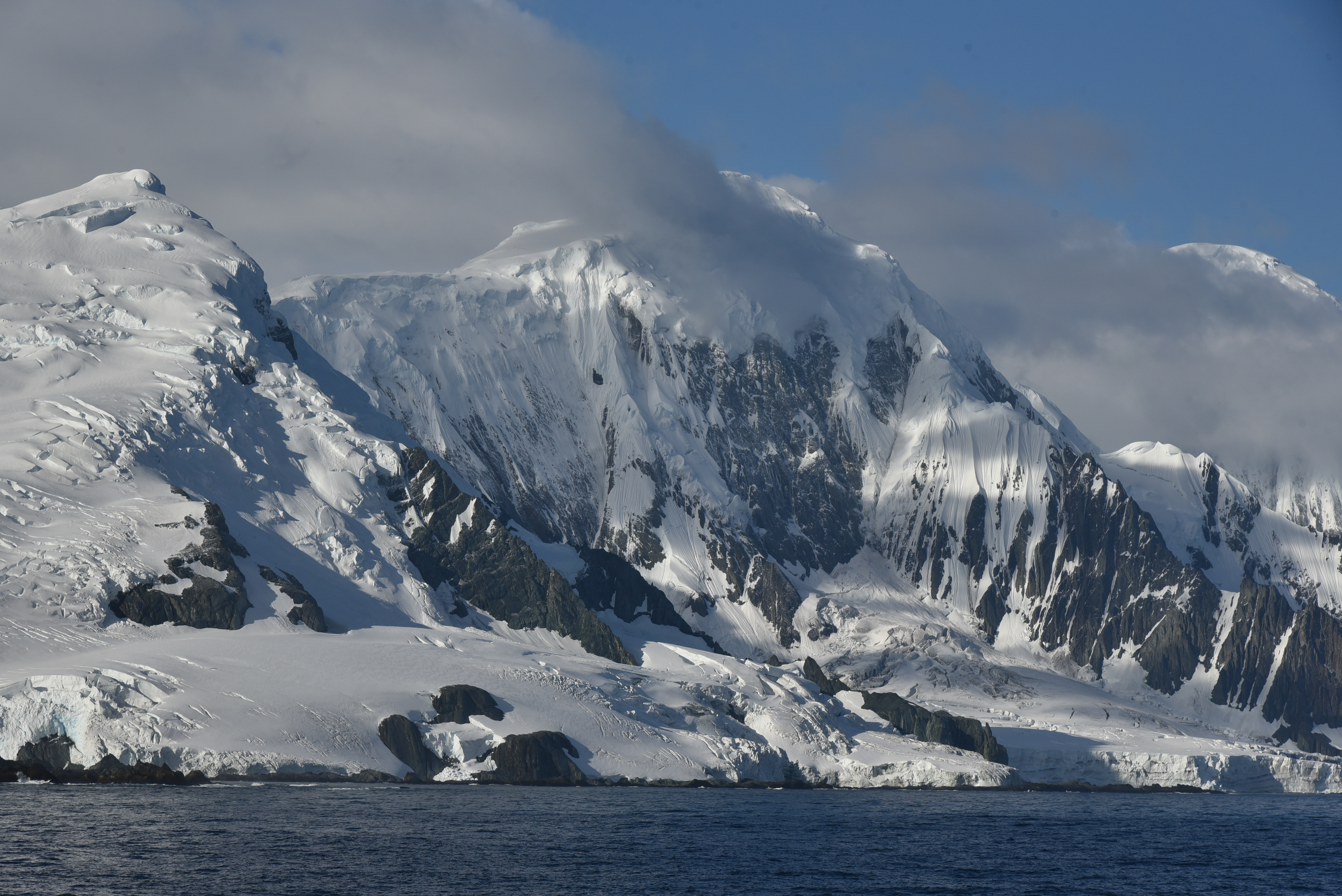
- Northwest coast of Smith Island with Saparevo Glacier in the right foreground

- Location within Antarctica
- Location: Smith Island; South Shetland Islands
- Coordinates: 63°53′48″S 62°23′20″W
- Length: 1 nautical mile (1.9 km; 1.2 mi)
- Width: 1.1 nautical miles (2.0 km; 1.3 mi)
- Thickness: unknown
- Terminus: Vedena Cove
- Status: unknown

Topographic map of Smith Island.

Large scale map of Cape Smith area on Smith Island in the South Shetland Islands

Saparevo Glacier (Bulgarian: ледник Сапарево, romanized: lednik Saparevo, IPA: [ˈlɛdnik sɐpɐˈrɛvo]; 62°53′48″S 62°23′20″W) is a 1.8 km (1.1 miles) long and 2 km (1.2 miles) wide glacier draining the northwest slopes of Imeon Range on Smith Island, South Shetland Islands, Antarctica. It is situated northeast of Kongur Glacier, and flows north-northeast of Mount Christi and southwest of Matochina Peak into Vedena Cove in Drake Passage. Bulgarian early mapping in 2009. The glacier is named after the settlement of Saparevo in Southwestern Bulgaria.

== See also ==
- List of glaciers in the Antarctic
- Glaciology

== Maps ==
- Chart of South Shetland including Coronation Island, &c. from the exploration of the sloop Dove in the years 1821 and 1822 by George Powell Commander of the same. Scale ca. 1:200000. London: Laurie, 1822.
- L.L. Ivanov. Antarctica: Livingston Island and Greenwich, Robert, Snow and Smith Islands. Scale 1:120000 topographic map. Troyan: Manfred Wörner Foundation, 2010. ISBN 978-954-92032-9-5 (First edition 2009. ISBN 978-954-92032-6-4)
- South Shetland Islands: Smith and Low Islands. Scale 1:150000 topographic map No. 13677. British Antarctic Survey, 2009.
- Antarctic Digital Database (ADD). Scale 1:250000 topographic map of Antarctica. Scientific Committee on Antarctic Research (SCAR). Since 1993, regularly upgraded and updated.
- L.L. Ivanov. Antarctica: Livingston Island and Smith Island. Scale 1:100000 topographic map. Manfred Wörner Foundation, 2017. ISBN 978-619-90008-3-0
- A. Kamburov, L. Ivanov, N. Aleksandrova, V. Nikolova. Cape Smith, Smith Island, Antarctica. Scale 1:10000 topographic map. Manfred Wörner Foundation, 2026. ISBN 978-619-92883-2-0
