= Mount Christi =

Mountain in Smith Island, South Shetland Islands, Antarctica

Location of Smith Island in the South Shetland Islands.

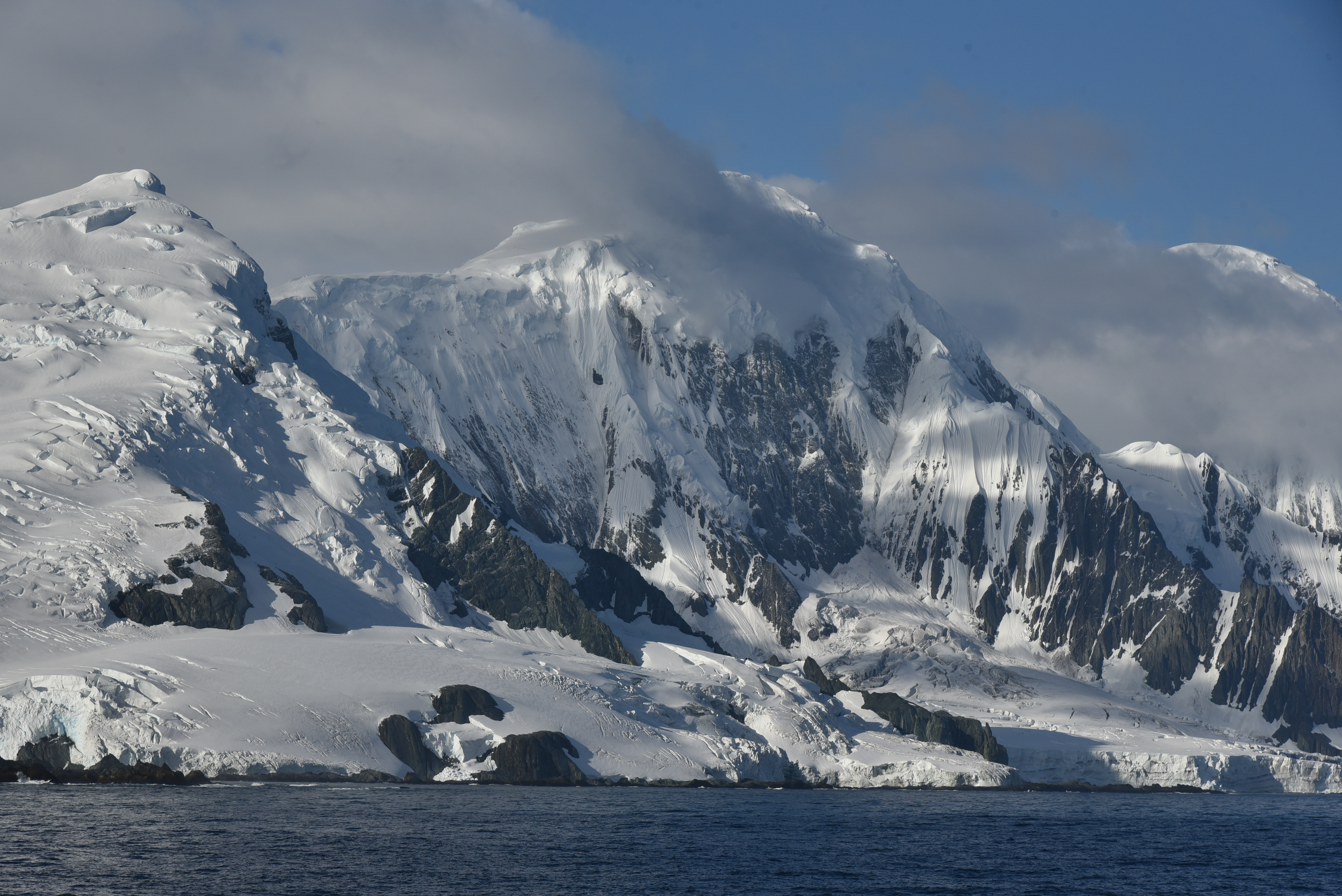
Northwest coast of Smith Island; left to right Matochina Peak, Mount Christi and Mount Pisgah

Topographic map of Smith Island.

Mount Christi is a mountain rising to 1,256 metres (4,121 ft) in the northern Imeon Range on Smith Island in the South Shetland Islands, Antarctica. The peak overlooks Kongur Glacier to the west-northwest, Saparevo Glacier to the north and Ritya Glacier to the southeast.

The name "Cape Christi" was given for the north cape of Smith Island by a British expedition under Henry Foster, 1828–31, but that feature had already been named Cape Smith. Since the latter name is approved for the cape, the UK Antarctic Place-names Committee recommended in 1953 that for the sake of historical continuity the name "Christi" be approved for the mountain now described.

== Location ==
The peak is located at 62°54′33.4″S 62°24′01″W which is 4.74 km northeast of Mount Pisgah, 3.36 km south-southwest of Delyan Point and 3.22 km southwest of Matochina Peak (Bulgarian mapping in 2009). The USGS gives the location as 62°55′S 62°24′W.

== Maps ==
- Chart of South Shetland including Coronation Island, &c. from the exploration of the sloop Dove in the years 1821 and 1822 by George Powell Commander of the same. Scale ca. 1:200000. London: Laurie, 1822.
- L.L. Ivanov. Antarctica: Livingston Island and Greenwich, Robert, Snow and Smith Islands. Scale 1:120000 topographic map. Troyan: Manfred Wörner Foundation, 2010. ISBN 978-954-92032-9-5 (First edition 2009. ISBN 978-954-92032-6-4)
- South Shetland Islands: Smith and Low Islands. Scale 1:150000 topographic map No. 13677. British Antarctic Survey, 2009.
- Antarctic Digital Database (ADD). Scale 1:250000 topographic map of Antarctica. Scientific Committee on Antarctic Research (SCAR). Since 1993, regularly upgraded and updated.
- L.L. Ivanov. Antarctica: Livingston Island and Smith Island. Scale 1:100000 topographic map. Manfred Wörner Foundation, 2017. ISBN 978-619-90008-3-0
- A. Kamburov, L. Ivanov, N. Aleksandrova, V. Nikolova. Cape Smith, Smith Island, Antarctica. Scale 1:10000 topographic map. Manfred Wörner Foundation, 2026. ISBN 978-619-92883-2-0
