= Kongur Glacier =

Glacier in Antarctica

- Location of Smith Island in the South Shetland Islands

- Location within South Shetland Islands Location within Antarctica
- Location: Smith Island; South Shetland Islands
- Coordinates: 62°54′23″S 62°25′48″W
- Length: 2.7 kilometres (1.7 mi)
- Thickness: unknown
- Terminus: Drake Passage
- Status: unknown

Topographic map of Smith Island.

Kongur Glacier (Bulgarian: ледник Конгур, romanized: lednik Kongur, IPA: [ˈlɛdnik ˈkɔŋɡor]) is a 2.7 kilometres (1.7 mi) long glacier draining the northwest slopes of Imeon Range on Smith Island in the South Shetland Islands, Antarctica. It is situated northeast of Dalgopol Glacier and southwest of Saparevo Glacier, and flows west of Mount Christi into Drake Passage. Bulgarian early mapping in 2009. The glacier is named after the peak and nature reserve of Kongur on Belasitsa Mountain in southwestern Bulgaria.

== Maps ==
- Chart of South Shetland including Coronation Island, &c. from the exploration of the sloop Dove in the years 1821 and 1822 by George Powell Commander of the same. Scale ca. 1:200000. London: Laurie, 1822.
- L.L. Ivanov. Antarctica: Livingston Island and Greenwich, Robert, Snow and Smith Islands. Scale 1:120000 topographic map. Troyan: Manfred Wörner Foundation, 2010. ISBN 978-954-92032-9-5 (First edition 2009. ISBN 978-954-92032-6-4)
- South Shetland Islands: Smith and Low Islands. Scale 1:150000 topographic map No. 13677. British Antarctic Survey, 2009.
- Antarctic Digital Database (ADD). Scale 1:250000 topographic map of Antarctica. Scientific Committee on Antarctic Research (SCAR). Since 1993, regularly upgraded and updated.
- L.L. Ivanov. Antarctica: Livingston Island and Smith Island. Scale 1:100000 topographic map. Manfred Wörner Foundation, 2017. ISBN 978-619-90008-3-0

== See also ==
- List of glaciers in the Antarctic
- Glaciology
