= Mount Pisgah (Smith Island) =

Mountain in Smith Island, South Shetland Islands, Antarctica

Location of Smith Island in the South Shetland Islands.

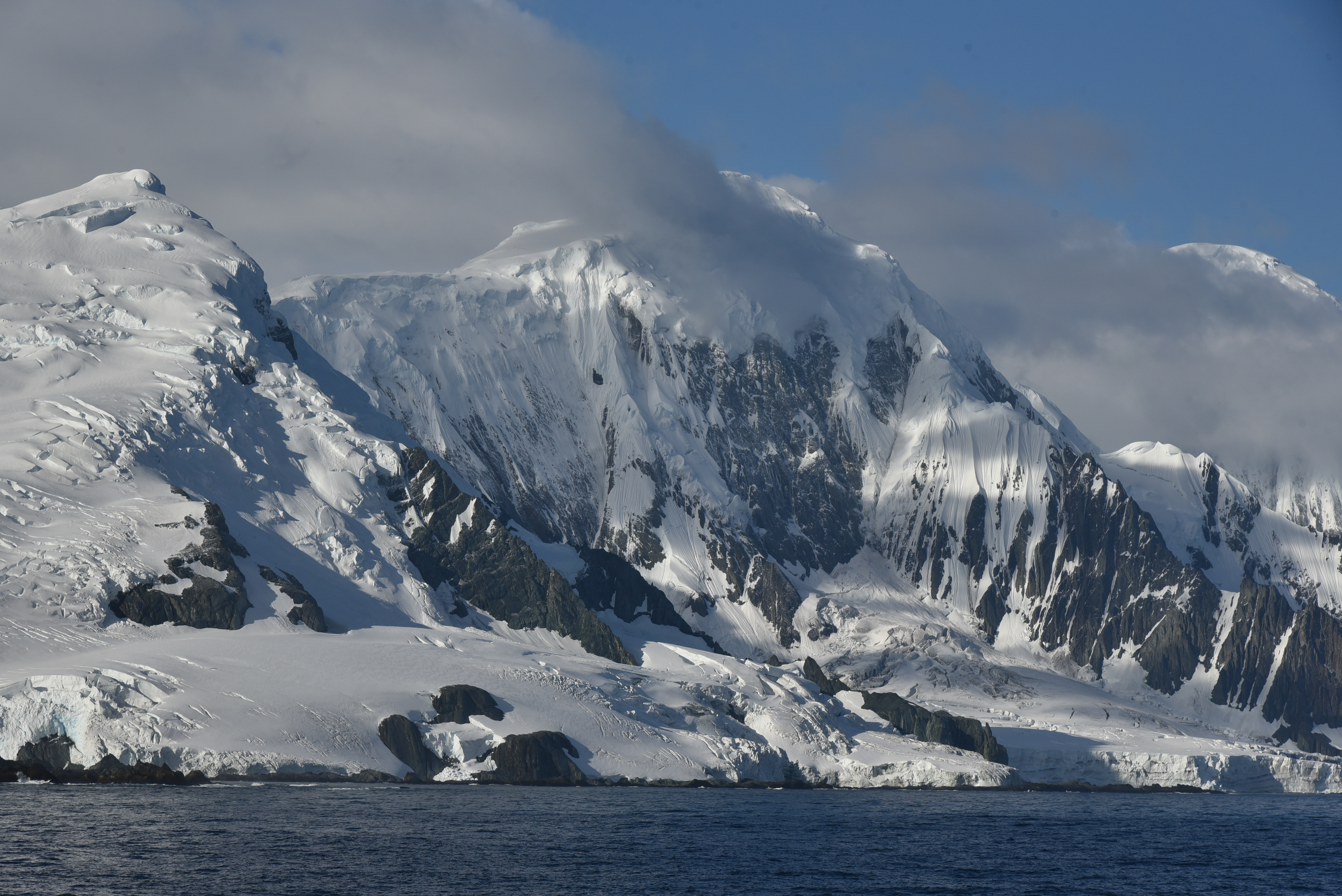
Northwest coast of Smith Island; left to right Matochina Peak, Mount Christi and Mount Pisgah

Topographic map of Smith Island.

Mount Pisgah is a peak rising to 1814 m in the north-central part of Imeon Range on Smith Island in the South Shetland Islands, Antarctica. It is linked by Kostenets Saddle to Drinov Peak to the southwest, and surmounts Dalgopol Glacier to the north and Vetrino Glacier to the west.

Because the peaks of Smith Island gave it a forked appearance when seen from a distance, American sealers in the 1820s called it Mount Pisgah Island after the double-topped Mount Pisgah in the town of Durham, CT. The name has since been restricted to the peak described.

== Location ==
The peak is located at 62°56′19.7″S 62°28′03″W which is 7.64 km northeast of Mount Foster, 1.85 km northeast of Drinov Peak, 3.9 km southeast of Gregory Point, 4.74 km southwest of Mount Christi and 1.1 km west of Mezek Peak (Bulgarian mapping in 2009).

== Maps ==
- Chart of South Shetland including Coronation Island, &c. from the exploration of the sloop Dove in the years 1821 and 1822 by George Powell Commander of the same. Scale ca. 1:200000. London: Laurie, 1822.
- L.L. Ivanov. Antarctica: Livingston Island and Greenwich, Robert, Snow and Smith Islands. Scale 1:120000 topographic map. Troyan: Manfred Wörner Foundation, 2010. ISBN 978-954-92032-9-5 (First edition 2009. ISBN 978-954-92032-6-4)
- South Shetland Islands: Smith and Low Islands. Scale 1:150000 topographic map No. 13677. British Antarctic Survey, 2009.
- Antarctic Digital Database (ADD). Scale 1:250000 topographic map of Antarctica. Scientific Committee on Antarctic Research (SCAR). Since 1993, regularly upgraded and updated.
- L.L. Ivanov. Antarctica: Livingston Island and Smith Island. Scale 1:100000 topographic map. Manfred Wörner Foundation, 2017. ISBN 978-619-90008-3-0

== See also ==
- Imeon Range
- Smith Island
