= Drinov Peak =

Peak in the South Shetland Islands, Antarctica

Coordinates: 62°57′08″S 62°29′20″W

Location of Smith Island in the South Shetland Islands.

Topographic map of Smith Island.

Drinov Peak (Bulgarian: Дринов връх, romanized: Drinov Vrah, IPA: [ˈdrinov ˈvrɤx]) is a peak rising to 1519 m in Imeon Range on Smith Island, South Shetland Islands. Situated 3.6 km north-northeast of Antim Peak, 1.9 km north of Slatina Peak, 2.91 km east-southeast of Jireček Point and 1.85 km southwest of Mount Pisgah. Overlooking Ovech Glacier to the southeast, Vetrino Glacier to the north, Yablanitsa Glacier to northwest, and Chuprene Glacier to the southwest. Bulgarian early mapping in 2009. Named after the Bulgarian scientist Marin Drinov (1838–1906), founding chairman of the Bulgarian Academy of Sciences.

== Maps ==
- Chart of South Shetland including Coronation Island, &c. from the exploration of the sloop Dove in the years 1821 and 1822 by George Powell Commander of the same. Scale ca. 1:200000. London: Laurie, 1822.
- L.L. Ivanov. Antarctica: Livingston Island and Greenwich, Robert, Snow and Smith Islands. Scale 1:120000 topographic map. Troyan: Manfred Wörner Foundation, 2010. ISBN 978-954-92032-9-5 (First edition 2009. ISBN 978-954-92032-6-4)
- South Shetland Islands: Smith and Low Islands. Scale 1:150000 topographic map No. 13677. British Antarctic Survey, 2009.
- Antarctic Digital Database (ADD). Scale 1:250000 topographic map of Antarctica. Scientific Committee on Antarctic Research (SCAR). Since 1993, regularly upgraded and updated.
- L.L. Ivanov. Antarctica: Livingston Island and Smith Island. Scale 1:100000 topographic map. Manfred Wörner Foundation, 2017. ISBN 978-619-90008-3-0
