= Cape Smith =

Cape in the South Shetland Islands, Antarctica

Location of Smith Island in the South Shetland Islands

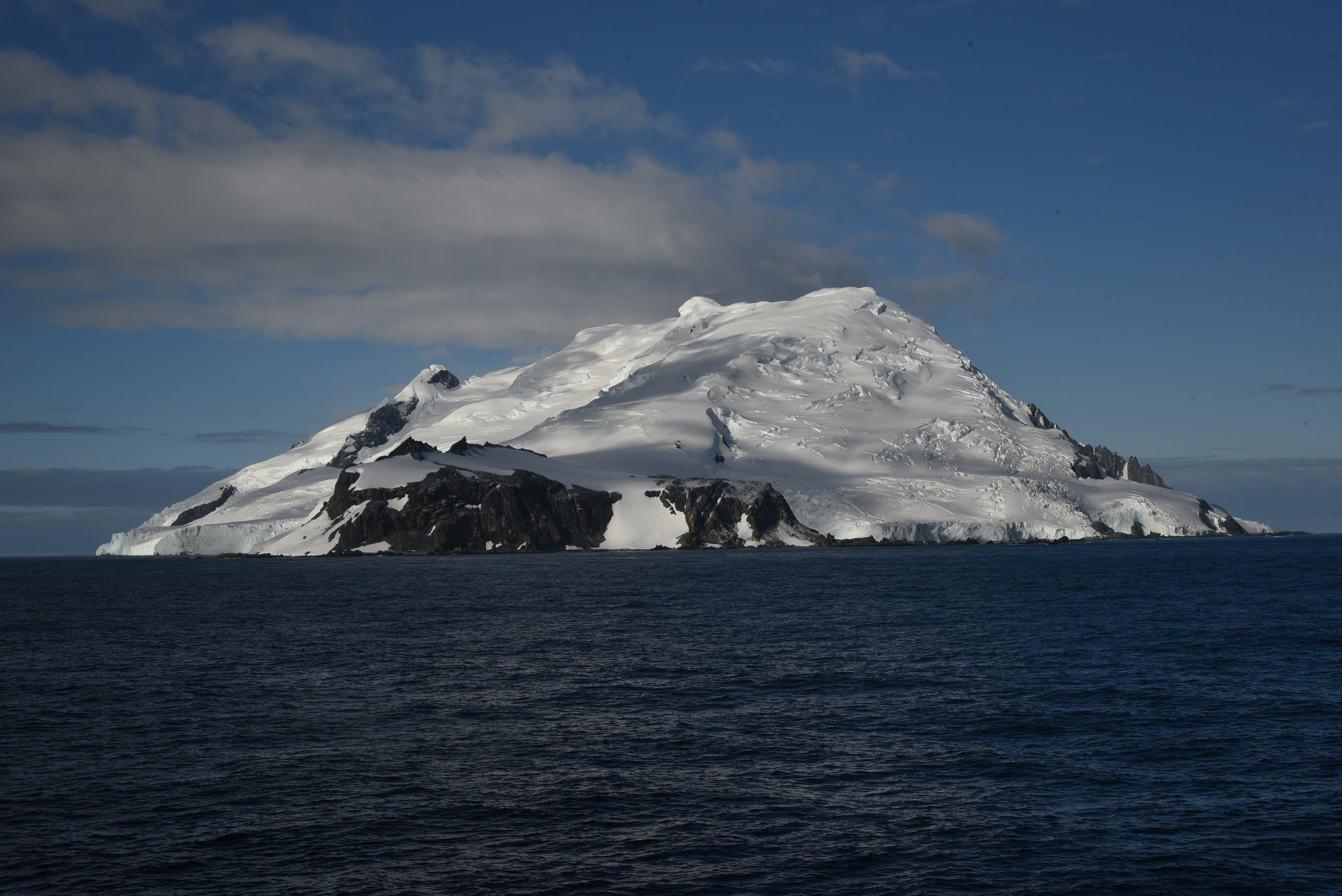
Cape Smith seen from Boyd Strait

Topographic map of Smith Island

Large scale map of Cape Smith area

Cape Smith is a cape forming the north end of Smith Island in the South Shetland Islands, Antarctica. The discovery of the South Shetland Islands was first reported in 1819 by Captain William Smith, for whom the cape is named.

== Location ==
The point is located at 62°52′25.5″S 62°18′00″W which is 3.31 km east-northeast of Matochina Peak, 12.85 km east-northeast of Gregory Point, 4.16 km east by north of Delyan Point, 2 km east-southeast of Barlow Island and 40.5 km west-southwest of Snow Island (Bulgarian mapping in 2009).

== Maps ==
- Chart of South Shetland including Coronation Island, &c. from the exploration of the sloop Dove in the years 1821 and 1822 by George Powell Commander of the same. Scale ca. 1:200000. London: Laurie, 1822.
- L.L. Ivanov. Antarctica: Livingston Island and Greenwich, Robert, Snow and Smith Islands. Scale 1:120000 topographic map. Troyan: Manfred Wörner Foundation, 2010. ISBN 978-954-92032-9-5 (First edition 2009. ISBN 978-954-92032-6-4)
- South Shetland Islands: Smith and Low Islands. Scale 1:150000 topographic map No. 13677. British Antarctic Survey, 2009.
- Antarctic Digital Database (ADD). Scale 1:250000 topographic map of Antarctica. Scientific Committee on Antarctic Research (SCAR). Since 1993, regularly upgraded and updated.
- L.L. Ivanov. Antarctica: Livingston Island and Smith Island. Scale 1:100000 topographic map. Manfred Wörner Foundation, 2017. ISBN 978-619-90008-3-0
- A. Kamburov, L. Ivanov, N. Aleksandrova, V. Nikolova. Cape Smith, Smith Island, Antarctica. Scale 1:10000 topographic map. Manfred Wörner Foundation, 2026. ISBN 978-619-92883-2-0
