= Bulgarian toponyms in Antarctica (H) =

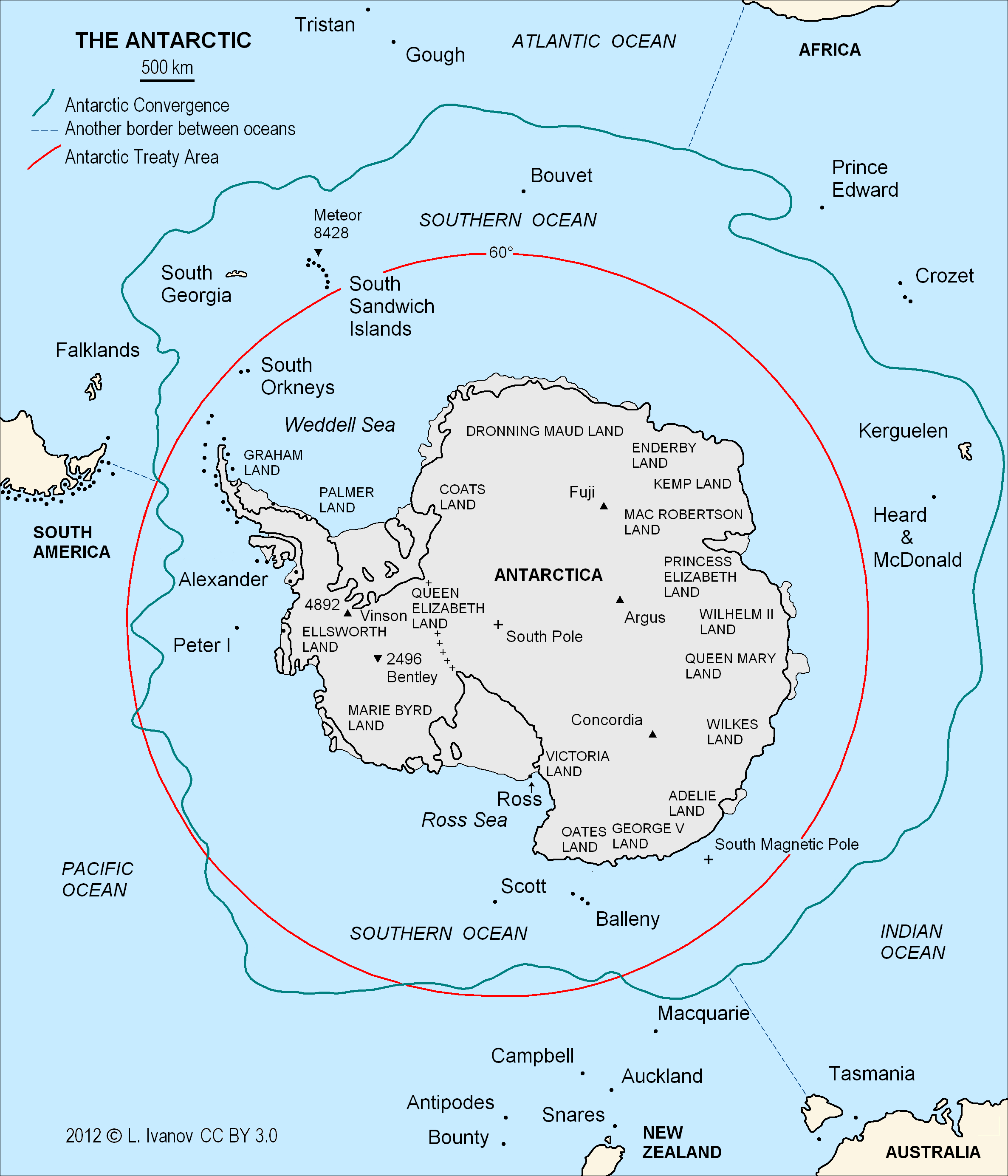
The South Polar Region.

- Habermehl Rock, Livingston Island
- Hadzhi Dimitar Peak, Graham Coast
- Hadzhiev Glacier, Alexander Island
- Hall Cove, Nelson Island
- Haralambiev Island, South Orkney Islands
- Hariton Peak, Sentinel Range
- Harmanli Cove, Tower Island
- Haskovo Cove, Greenwich Island
- Hayduta Buttress, Fallières Coast
- Hazarbasanov Ridge, Trinity Peninsula
- Hebrizelm Hill, Greenwich Island
- Heksagon Tarn, Livingston Island
- Helis Nunatak, Livingston Island
- Hemimont Plateau, Loubet Coast
- Hemus Peak, Livingston Island
- Herbst Nunatak, Alexander Island
- Heros Peninsula, Foyn Coast
- Herring Point, Rugged Island
- Hervé Island, Biscoe Islands
- Hesperides Hill, Livingston Island
- Hisarya Cove, Smith Island
- Hitar Petar Nunatak, Trinity Peninsula
- Hitov Spur, Oscar II Coast
- Hitrino Ridge, Oscar II Coast
- Mount Hleven, Sentinel Range
- Hoatsin Island, Wilhelm Archipelago
- Hochstetter Peak, Trinity Peninsula
- Hodges Knoll, Sentinel Range
- Hondius Inlet, Bowman Coast
- Hrabar Nunatak, Greenwich Island
- Huhla Col, Trinity Peninsula
- Huma Nunatak, Trinity Peninsula
- Humar Peak, Oscar II Coast
- Hvarchil Point, Brabant Island
- Hvoyna Cove, Davis Coast
- Mount Hypothesis, Nordenskjöld Coast

== See also ==
- Bulgarian toponyms in Antarctica

== Bibliography ==
- J. Stewart. Antarctica: An Encyclopedia. Jefferson, N.C. and London: McFarland, 2011. 1771 pp. ISBN 978-0-7864-3590-6
- L. Ivanov. Bulgarian Names in Antarctica. Sofia: Manfred Wörner Foundation, 2021. Second edition. 539 pp. ISBN 978-619-90008-5-4 (in Bulgarian)
- G. Bakardzhieva. Bulgarian toponyms in Antarctica. Paisiy Hilendarski University of Plovdiv: Research Papers. Vol. 56, Book 1, Part A, 2018 – Languages and Literature, pp. 104-119 (in Bulgarian)
- L. Ivanov and N. Ivanova. Bulgarian names. In: The World of Antarctica. Generis Publishing, 2022. pp. 114-115. ISBN 979-8-88676-403-1
