= Bulgarian toponyms in Antarctica (L) =

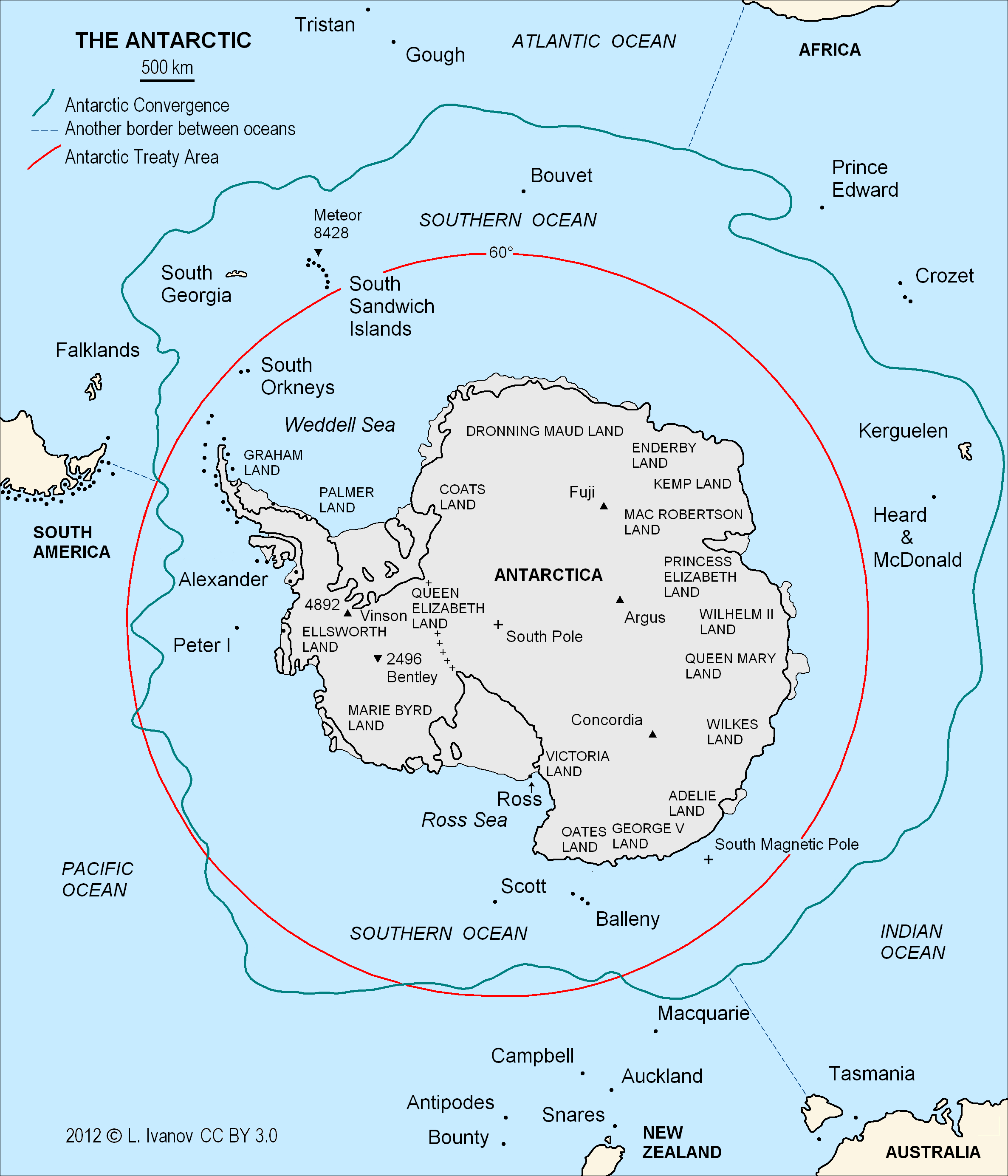
The South Polar Region.

- Lakatnik Point, Smith Island
- Laki Peak, Nordenskjöld Coast
- Lale Buttress, Davis Coast
- Lamantin Island, Wilhelm Archipelago
- Lambreva Beach, Nelson Island
- Lambuh Knoll, Trinity Peninsula
- Lamya Island, Wilhelm Archipelago
- Landreth Glacier, Smith Island
- Lapa Island, Wilhelm Archipelago
- Lapteva Island, Anvers Island
- Lardeya Ice Piedmont, Sentinel Range
- Lardigo Peak, Trinity Peninsula
- Laskar Point, Graham Coast
- Latinka Cove, Danco Coast
- Lavrenov Point, Robert Island
- Lazuren Bryag Cove, South Orkney Islands
- Lebed Point, Clarence Island
- Ledenika Peak, Trinity Peninsula
- Leeve Island, Robert Island
- Lenoir Rock, Smith Island
- Lepitsa Peak, Trinity Peninsula
- Leppe Island, Biscoe Islands
- Leshko Point, Liège Island
- Lesicheri Glacier, Oscar II Coast
- Lesidren Island, Zed Islands
- Leslie Gap, Livingston Island
- Lesnovo Hill, Alexander Island
- Lesura Cove, Two Hummock Island
- Letnitsa Glacier, Smith Island
- Levenov Point, Brabant Island
- Levski Peak, Livingston Island
- Levski Ridge, Livingston Island
- Leyka Lake, Nelson Island
- Limets Peninsula, Low Island
- Limoza Island, D'Urville Island
- Linevo Cove, Smith Island
- Linus Beach, Snow Island
- Linzipar Lake, Livingston Island
- Lipen Glacier, Anvers Island
- Lisiya Ridge, Graham Coast
- Liverpool Beach, Livingston Island
- Mount Llana, Clarence Island
- Lobosh Buttress, Trinity Peninsula
- Lom Peak, Livingston Island
- Long Beach, Nelson Island
- Lopyan Crag, Trinity Peninsula
- Lorna Cove, Trinity Island
- Lovech Heights, Nordenskjöld Coast
- Lozen Nunatak, Livingston Island
- Lozen Saddle, Livingston Island
- Ludogorie Peak, Livingston Island
- Lukovit Point, Livingston Island
- Lukovo Point, Livingston Island
- Luna Island, Biscoe Islands
- Lyaskovets Peak, Livingston Island
- Lyubimets Nunatak, Alexander Island
- Lyulin Peak, Livingston Island
- Lyutibrod Rocks, Low Island
- Lyutitsa Nunatak, Greenwich Island

== See also ==
- Bulgarian toponyms in Antarctica

== Bibliography ==
- J. Stewart. Antarctica: An Encyclopedia. Jefferson, N.C. and London: McFarland, 2011. 1771 pp. ISBN 978-0-7864-3590-6
- L. Ivanov. Bulgarian Names in Antarctica. Sofia: Manfred Wörner Foundation, 2021. Second edition. 539 pp. ISBN 978-619-90008-5-4 (in Bulgarian)
- G. Bakardzhieva. Bulgarian toponyms in Antarctica. Paisiy Hilendarski University of Plovdiv: Research Papers. Vol. 56, Book 1, Part A, 2018 – Languages and Literature, pp. 104-119 (in Bulgarian)
- L. Ivanov and N. Ivanova. Bulgarian names. In: The World of Antarctica. Generis Publishing, 2022. pp. 114-115. ISBN 979-8-88676-403-1
