= Bulgarian toponyms in Antarctica (Z) =

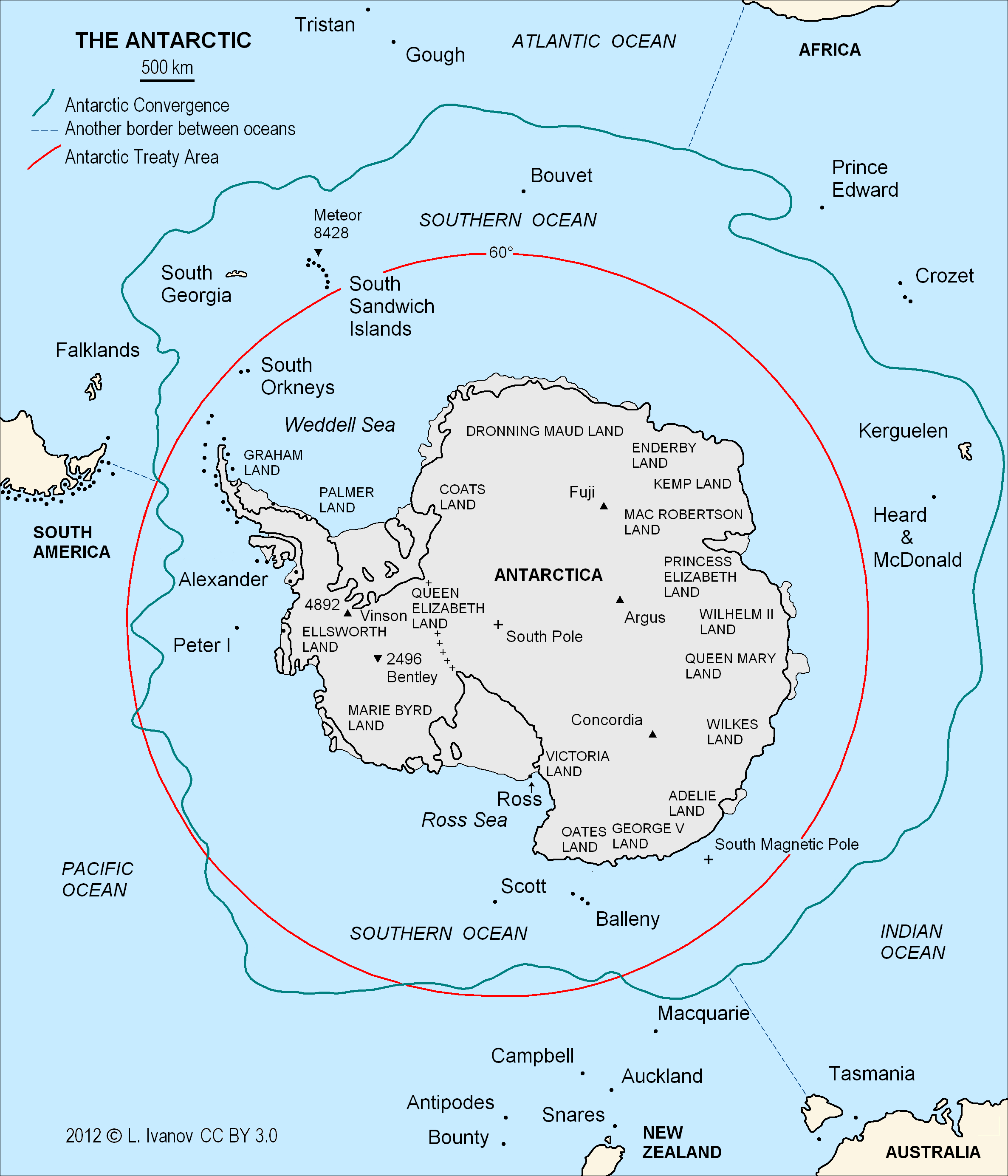
The South Polar Region.

- Zabel Point, Brabant Island
- Zabergan Peak, Foyn Coast
- Zabernovo Bastion, Davis Coast
- Mount Zadruga, Oscar II Coast
- Zagore Beach, Livingston Island
- Zagrade Point, Krogh Island
- Zagreus Ridge, Oscar II Coast
- Zahari Point, Robert Island
- Zahariev Peak, Oscar II Coast
- Zaldapa Ridge, Trinity Peninsula
- Zalmoxis Peak, Sentinel Range
- Zanoge Hill, Trinity Peninsula
- Zapalnya Cove, Smith Island
- Zasele Peak, Nordenskjöld Coast
- Zavala Island, Livingston Island
- Zavera Snowfield, Trinity Peninsula
- Zavet Saddle, Smith Island
- Zavoy Nunatak, Alexander Island
- Zaychar Glacier, Nordenskjöld Coast
- Zbelsurd Glacier, Liège Island
- Zebil Island, Low Island
- Zelenika Peak, Brabant Island
- Zemen Knoll, Livingston Island
- Zgorigrad Nunatak, Nordenskjöld Coast
- Zhefarovich Crag, Fallières Coast
- Zhelad Saddle, Danco Coast
- Zhelev Peak, Loubet Coast
- Zhelyava Hill, Livingston Island
- Zhenda Glacier, Sentinel Range
- Zherav Island, Wilhelm Archipelago
- Zheravna Glacier, Greenwich Island
- Ziezi Peak, Greenwich Island
- Zikoniya Island, Trinity Island
- Zimen Inlet, Oscar II Coast
- Zimornitsa Peak, Sentinel Range
- Zimzelen Glacier, Danco Coast
- Zlatiya Glacier, Brabant Island
- Zlatni Pyasatsi Cove, Elephant Island
- Zlatograd Rock, Livingston Island
- Zlatolist Hill, Trinity Peninsula
- Zlidol Gate, Trinity Peninsula
- Zlogosh Passage, Liège Island
- Zlokuchene Glacier, Nordenskjöld Coast
- Zmeevo Pass, Sentinel Range
- Znepole Ice Piedmont, Trinity Peninsula
- Zograf Peak, Livingston Island
- Zornitsa Cove, Livingston Island
- Zvegor Saddle, Sentinel Range
- Zverino Island, Greenwich Island

== See also ==
- Bulgarian toponyms in Antarctica

== Bibliography ==
- J. Stewart. Antarctica: An Encyclopedia. Jefferson, N.C. and London: McFarland, 2011. 1771 pp. ISBN 978-0-7864-3590-6
- L. Ivanov. Bulgarian Names in Antarctica. Sofia: Manfred Wörner Foundation, 2021. Second edition. 539 pp. ISBN 978-619-90008-5-4 (in Bulgarian)
- G. Bakardzhieva. Bulgarian toponyms in Antarctica. Paisiy Hilendarski University of Plovdiv: Research Papers. Vol. 56, Book 1, Part A, 2018 – Languages and Literature, pp. 104-119 (in Bulgarian)
- L. Ivanov and N. Ivanova. Bulgarian names. In: The World of Antarctica. Generis Publishing, 2022. pp. 114-115. ISBN 979-8-88676-403-1
