= Bulgarian toponyms in Antarctica (O) =

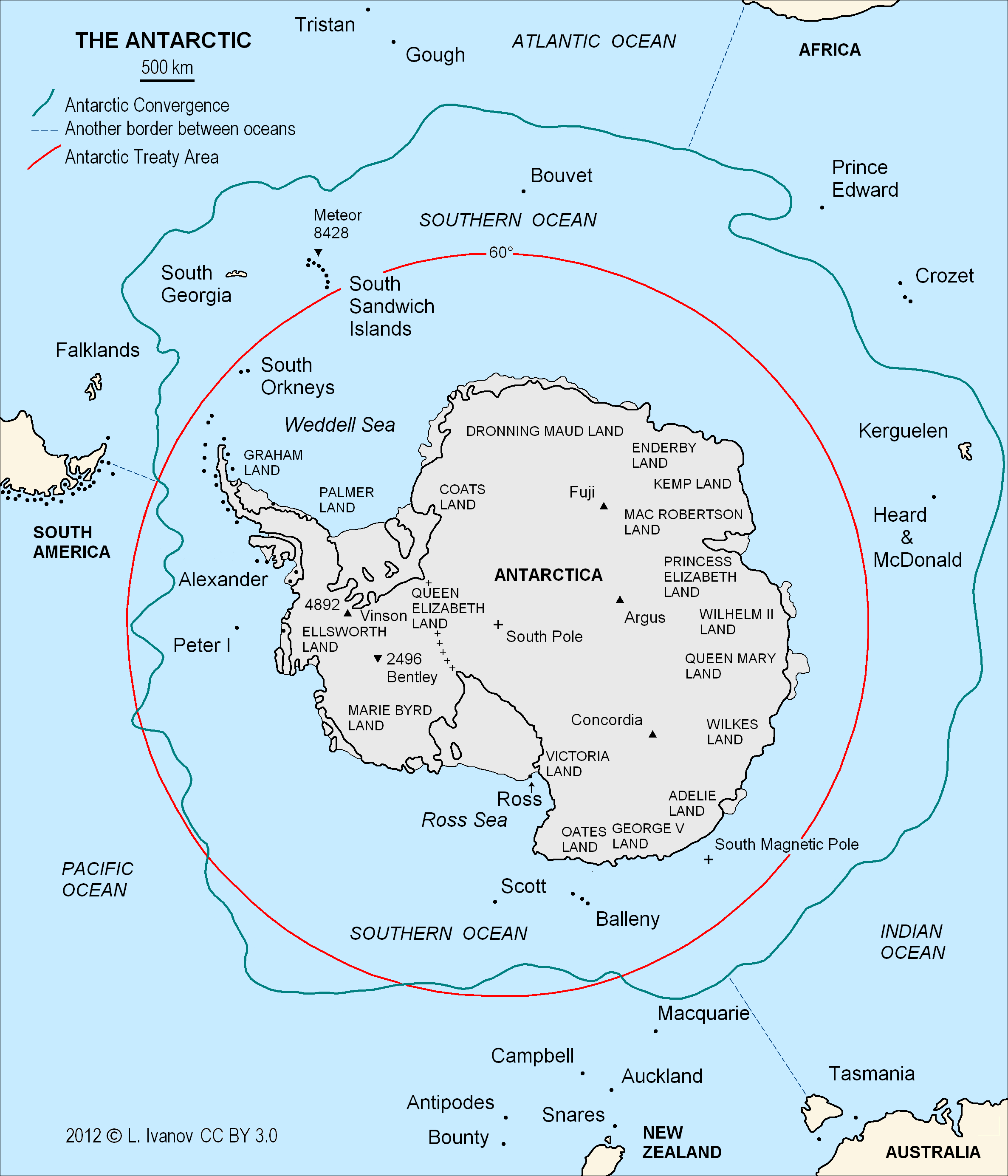
The South Polar Region.

- Obelya Glacier, Sentinel Range
- Oberbauer Point, Anvers Island
- Obidim Peak, Trinity Peninsula
- Obitel Peninsula, Anvers Island
- Oborishte Ridge, Greenwich Island
- Obretenik Bastion, Danco Coast
- Obzor Hill, Trinity Peninsula
- Odesos Buttress, Nordenskjöld Coast
- Odometer Rock, Nelson Island
- Odrin Bay, Nordenskjöld Coast
- Oeagrus Beach Snow Island
- Oescus Island, Robert Island
- Ofelia Island, Joinville Island
- Ogled Peak, Trinity Peninsula
- Ognen Cove, Trinity Peninsula
- Ogosta Point, Livingston Island
- Ogoya Glacier, Trinity Peninsula
- Ograzhden Cove, Livingston Island
- Ogygia Island, Snow Island
- Ohoden Col, Trinity Peninsula
- Ojeda Beach, Livingston Island
- Okol Rocks, Aitcho Islands
- Okorsh Saddle, Oscar II Coast
- Olusha Cove, Trinity Island
- Omurtag Pass, Livingston Island
- Ongal Peak, Livingston Island
- Onogur Islands, Robert Island
- Opaka Rocks, Robert Island
- Opalchenie Peak, Vinson Massif
- Opitsvet Lake, Livingston Island
- Opizo Peak, Brabant Island
- Orbel Peak, Graham Coast
- Orcho Glacier, Clarence Island
- Oread Lake, Livingston Island
- Oreshak Peak, Sentinel Range
- Organa Peak, Smith Island
- Orizari Glacier, Sentinel Range
- Orpheus Gate, Livingston Island
- Orsini Rock, Livingston Island
- Orsoya Rocks, Robert Island
- Oryahovo Heights, Livingston Island
- Oselna Glacier, Alexander Island
- Osenovlag Island, Robert Island
- Oshane Glacier, Brabant Island
- Osikovo Ridge, Graham Coast
- Osmar Strait, South Shetland Islands
- Osogovo Bay, Livingston Island
- Ostrusha Nunatak, Sentinel Range
- Ovech Glacier, Smith Island

== See also ==
- Bulgarian toponyms in Antarctica

== Bibliography ==
- J. Stewart. Antarctica: An Encyclopedia. Jefferson, N.C. and London: McFarland, 2011. 1771 pp. ISBN 978-0-7864-3590-6
- L. Ivanov. Bulgarian Names in Antarctica. Sofia: Manfred Wörner Foundation, 2021. Second edition. 539 pp. ISBN 978-619-90008-5-4 (in Bulgarian)
- G. Bakardzhieva. Bulgarian toponyms in Antarctica. Paisiy Hilendarski University of Plovdiv: Research Papers. Vol. 56, Book 1, Part A, 2018 – Languages and Literature, pp. 104-119 (in Bulgarian)
- L. Ivanov and N. Ivanova. Bulgarian names. In: The World of Antarctica. Generis Publishing, 2022. pp. 114-115. ISBN 979-8-88676-403-1
