= Bulgarian toponyms in Antarctica (E) =

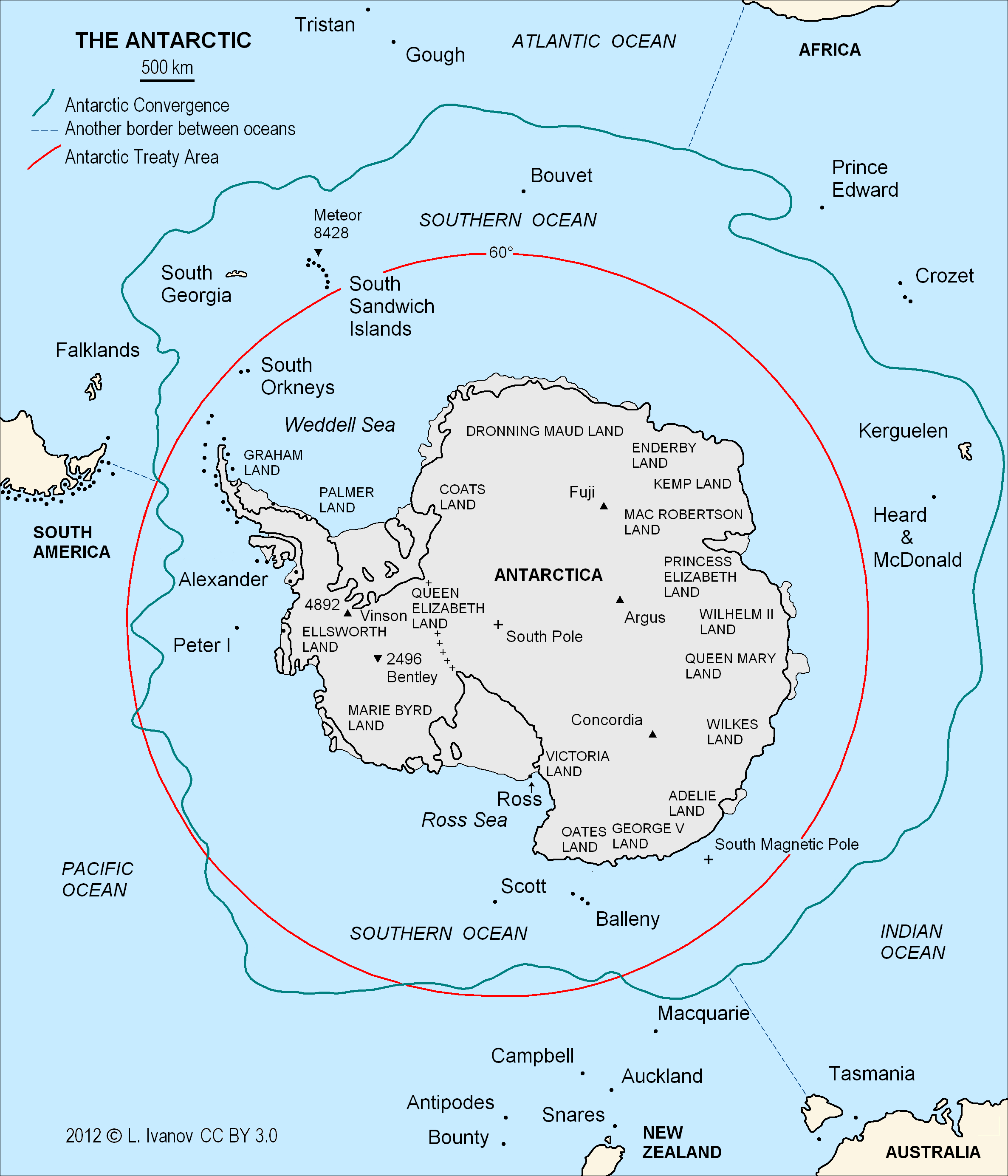
The South Polar Region.

- Eduard Nunatak, Oscar II Coast
- Egerika Range, Danco Coast
- Elemag Reef, Livingston Island
- Elena Peak, Livingston Island
- Elhovo Gap, Livingston Island
- Elin Pelin Point, Smith Island
- Eliseyna Cove, Livingston Island
- Elovdol Glacier, Oscar II Coast
- Elysian Beach, Snow Island
- Emen Island, Anvers Island
- Emona Anchorage, Livingston Island
- Enitsa Peak, Sentinel Range
- Enravota Glacier, Nordenskjöld Coast
- Enrique Hill, Livingston Island
- Eratosthenes Point, Elephant Island
- Erden Glacier, Oscar II Coast
- Eremiya Hill, Trinity Peninsula
- Ereta Peak, Bastien Range
- Erma Knoll, Livingston Island
- Erovete Peak, Loubet Coast
- Erul Heights, Trinity Peninsula
- Eridanus Stream, Livingston Island
- Esperanto Island, Zed Islands
- Etar Snowfield, Livingston Island
- Etropole Peak, Livingston Island
- Eurydice Peninsula, Danco Coast
- Evlogi Peak, Smith Island
- Eyer Peak, Sentinel Range
- Ezdimir Buttress, Davis Coast
- Ezerets Knoll, Graham Coast

== See also ==
- Bulgarian toponyms in Antarctica

== Bibliography ==
- J. Stewart. Antarctica: An Encyclopedia. Jefferson, N.C. and London: McFarland, 2011. 1771 pp. ISBN 978-0-7864-3590-6
- L. Ivanov. Bulgarian Names in Antarctica. Sofia: Manfred Wörner Foundation, 2021. Second edition. 539 pp. ISBN 978-619-90008-5-4 (in Bulgarian)
- G. Bakardzhieva. Bulgarian toponyms in Antarctica. Paisiy Hilendarski University of Plovdiv: Research Papers. Vol. 56, Book 1, Part A, 2018 – Languages and Literature, pp. 104-119 (in Bulgarian)
- L. Ivanov and N. Ivanova. Bulgarian names. In: The World of Antarctica. Generis Publishing, 2022. pp. 114-115. ISBN 979-8-88676-403-1
