= Bulgarian toponyms in Antarctica (I) =

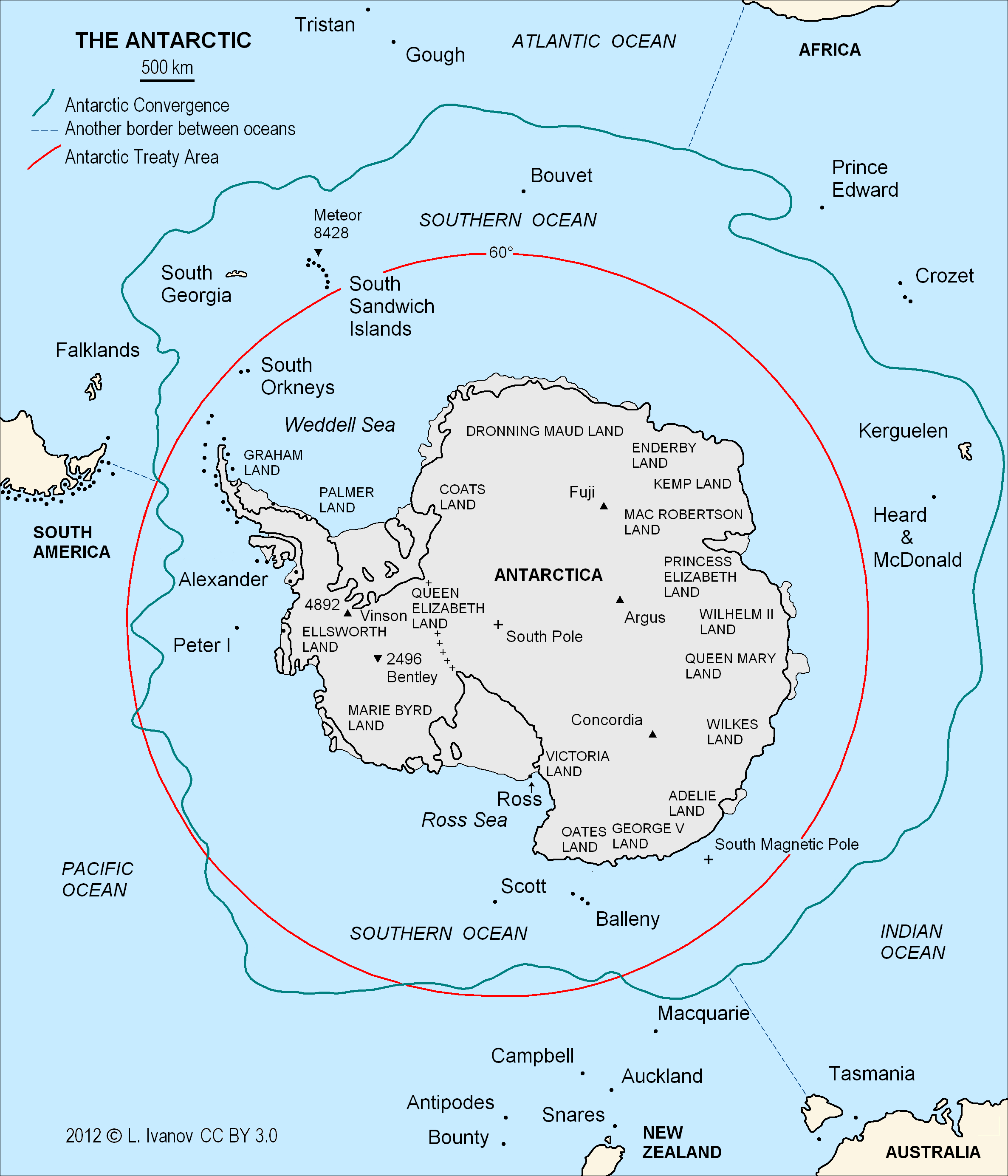
The South Polar Region.

- Ichera Peak, Sentinel Range
- Ichev Nunatak, Bastien Range
- Iglika Passage, Livingston Island
- Mount Ignatiev, Trinity Peninsula
- Igralishte Peak, Alexander Island
- Ihtiman Hook, Livingston Island
- Ilarion Ridge, Greenwich Island
- Ilchev Buttress, Graham Coast
- Iliev Glacier, Alexander Island
- Ilinden Peak, Greenwich Island
- Ilyo Point, Clarence Island
- Imelin Island, Trinity Island
- Imeon Range, Smith Island
- Intuition Peak, Livingston Island
- Ioannes Paulus II Peninsula, Livingston Island
- Irakli Peak, Trinity Peninsula
- Iratais Point, Desolation Island
- Irnik Point, Snow Island
- Isbul Point, Livingston Island
- Ishirkov Crag, Oscar II Coast
- Iskar Glacier, Livingston Island
- Iskra Peak, Oscar II Coast
- Istros Bay, Clarence Island
- Ivan Alexander Point, Nelson Island
- Ivan Asen Cove, Smith Island
- Ivan Asen Point, Smith Island
- Ivan Vladislav Point, Rugged Island
- Ivanili Heights, Oscar II Coast
- Ivanov Beach, Livingston Island
- Ivats Peak, Nordenskjöld Coast
- Ivaylo Cove, Snow Island
- Izgrev Passage, Robert Island
- Mount Izvor, Oscar II Coast

== See also ==
- Bulgarian toponyms in Antarctica

== Bibliography ==
- J. Stewart. Antarctica: An Encyclopedia. Jefferson, N.C. and London: McFarland, 2011. 1771 pp. ISBN 978-0-7864-3590-6
- L. Ivanov. Bulgarian Names in Antarctica. Sofia: Manfred Wörner Foundation, 2021. Second edition. 539 pp. ISBN 978-619-90008-5-4 (in Bulgarian)
- G. Bakardzhieva. Bulgarian toponyms in Antarctica. Paisiy Hilendarski University of Plovdiv: Research Papers. Vol. 56, Book 1, Part A, 2018 – Languages and Literature, pp. 104-119 (in Bulgarian)
- L. Ivanov and N. Ivanova. Bulgarian names. In: The World of Antarctica. Generis Publishing, 2022. pp. 114-115. ISBN 979-8-88676-403-1
