= Bulgarian toponyms in Antarctica (Y) =

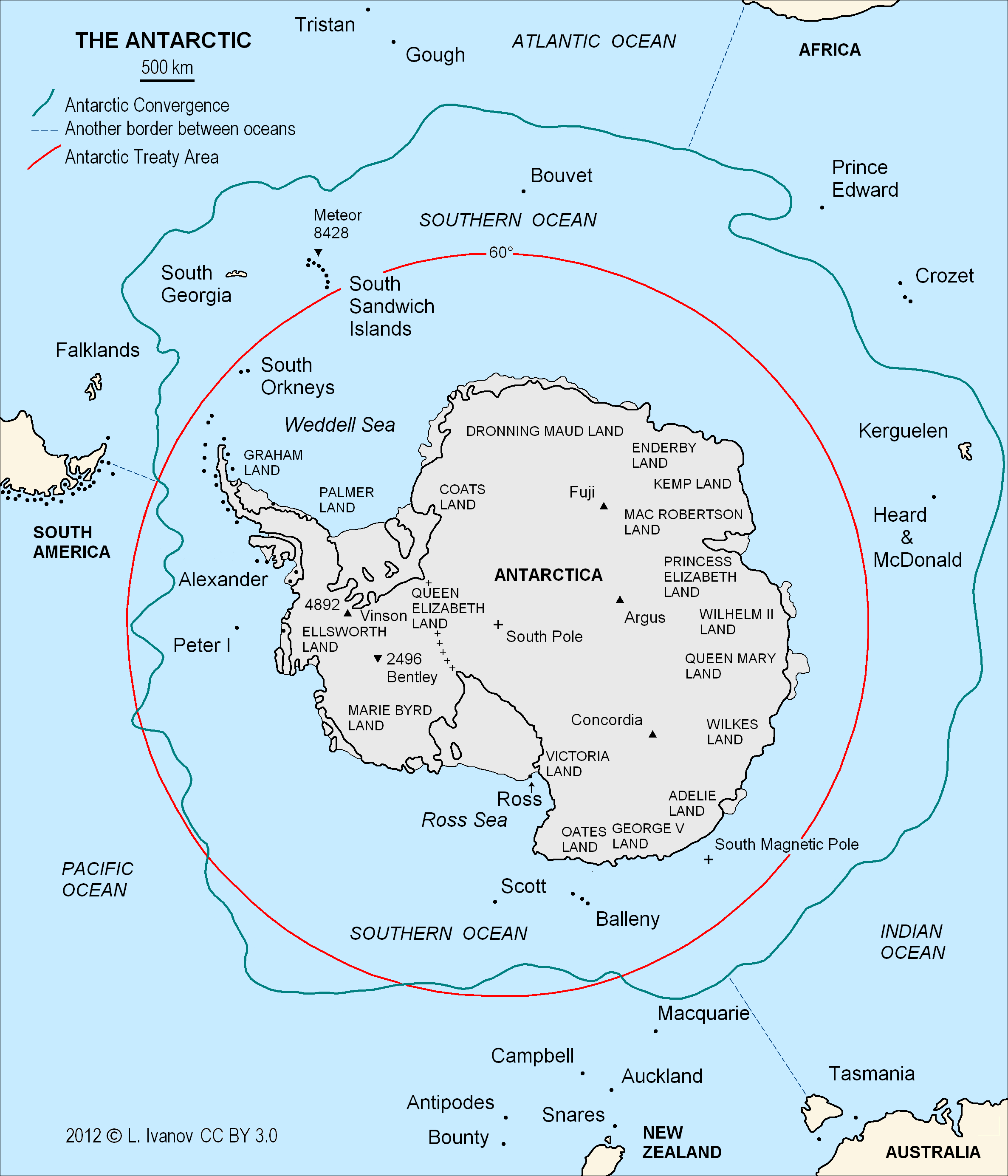
The South Polar Region.

- Yablanitsa Glacier, Smith Island
- Yagodina Knoll, Trinity Peninsula
- Yakoruda Glacier, Greenwich Island
- Yambol Peak, Livingston Island
- Yamen Glacier, Sentinel Range
- Yamforina Cove, Oscar II Coast
- Yana Point, Livingston Island
- Yankov Gap, Livingston Island
- Yantra Cove, Livingston Island
- Yarebitsa Cove, Smith Island
- Yarlovo Nunatak, Trinity Peninsula
- Yasen Point, Livingston Island
- Yastreb Island, Wilhelm Archipelago
- Yato Rocks, Wilhelm Archipelago
- Yatrus Promontory, Trinity Peninsula
- Yavorov Peak, Livingston Island
- Yoglav Crag, Trinity Peninsula
- Yordanov Nunatak, Oscar II Coast
- Yordanov Island, South Orkney Islands
- Yovkov Point, Greenwich Island
- Yozola Glacier, Alexander Island
- Yrvind Island, Nelson Island
- Yunak Peak, Brabant Island
- Yundola Cove, Robert Island

== See also ==
- Bulgarian toponyms in Antarctica

== Bibliography ==
- J. Stewart. Antarctica: An Encyclopedia. Jefferson, N.C. and London: McFarland, 2011. 1771 pp. ISBN 978-0-7864-3590-6
- L. Ivanov. Bulgarian Names in Antarctica. Sofia: Manfred Wörner Foundation, 2021. Second edition. 539 pp. ISBN 978-619-90008-5-4 (in Bulgarian)
- G. Bakardzhieva. Bulgarian toponyms in Antarctica. Paisiy Hilendarski University of Plovdiv: Research Papers. Vol. 56, Book 1, Part A, 2018 – Languages and Literature, pp. 104-119 (in Bulgarian)
- L. Ivanov and N. Ivanova. Bulgarian names. In: The World of Antarctica. Generis Publishing, 2022. pp. 114–115. ISBN 979-8-88676-403-1
