= Bulgarian toponyms in Antarctica (U) =

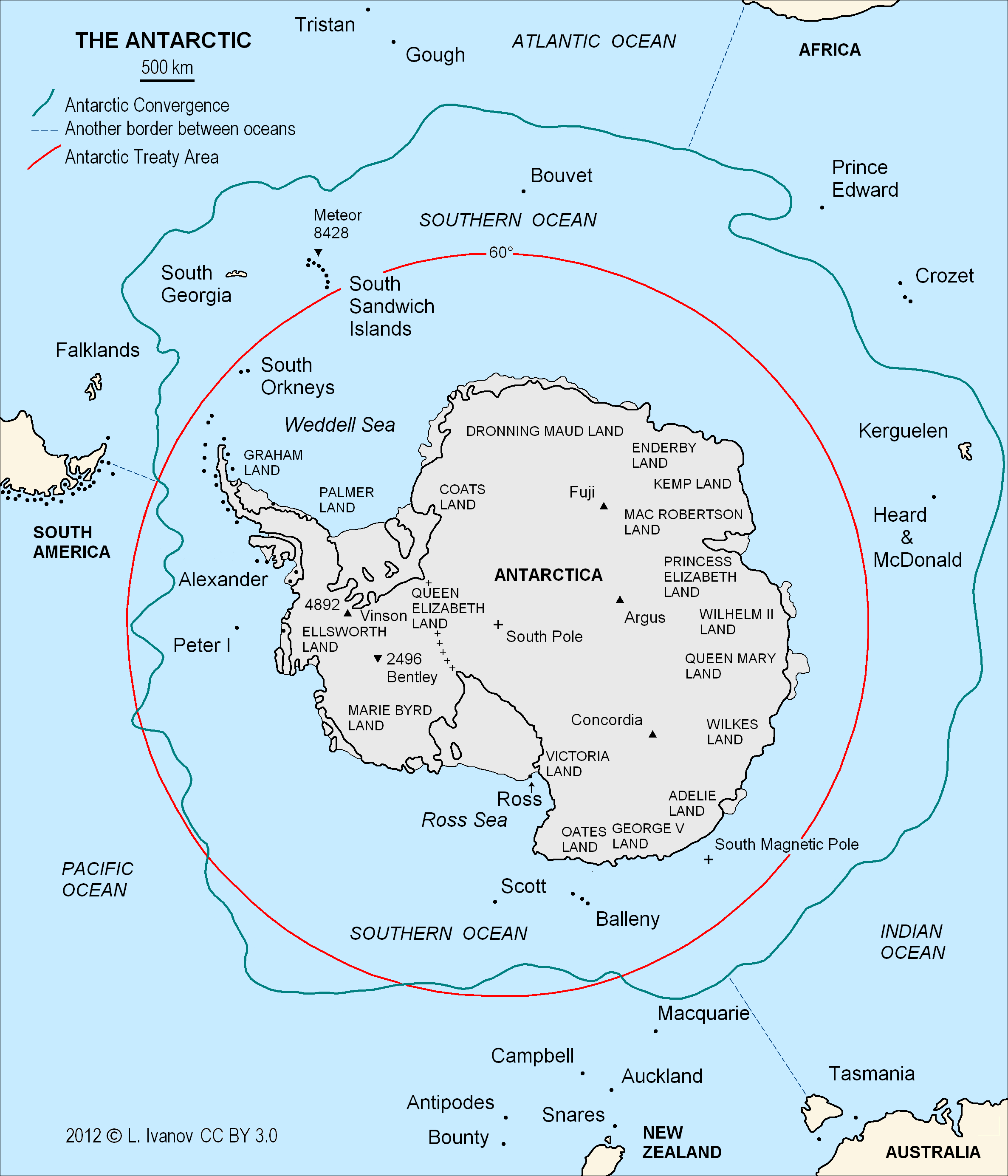
The South Polar Region.

- Ugain Point, Rugged Island
- Ugarchin Point, Robert Island
- Ugorelets Point, Low Island
- Urania Cove, Two Hummock Island
- Urda Ridge, Clarence Island
- Urdoviza Glacier, Livingston Island
- Urguri Nunatak, Trinity Peninsula
- Urovene Cove, Graham Coast
- Urvich Wall, Livingston Island
- Ushi Cliffs, Oscar II Coast
- Ushlinova Peak, Graham Coast
- Ustina Point, Tower Island
- Ustra Peak, Livingston Island
- Utus Peak, Trinity Peninsula

== See also ==
- Bulgarian toponyms in Antarctica

== Bibliography ==
- J. Stewart. Antarctica: An Encyclopedia. Jefferson, N.C. and London: McFarland, 2011. 1771 pp. ISBN 978-0-7864-3590-6
- L. Ivanov. Bulgarian Names in Antarctica. Sofia: Manfred Wörner Foundation, 2021. Second edition. 539 pp. ISBN 978-619-90008-5-4 (in Bulgarian)
- G. Bakardzhieva. Bulgarian toponyms in Antarctica. Paisiy Hilendarski University of Plovdiv: Research Papers. Vol. 56, Book 1, Part A, 2018 – Languages and Literature, pp. 104-119 (in Bulgarian)
- L. Ivanov and N. Ivanova. Bulgarian names. In: The World of Antarctica. Generis Publishing, 2022. pp. 114-115. ISBN 979-8-88676-403-1
