= St. Evtimiy Crag =

Rocky peak

Location of Tangra Mountains on Livingston Island in the South Shetland Islands.

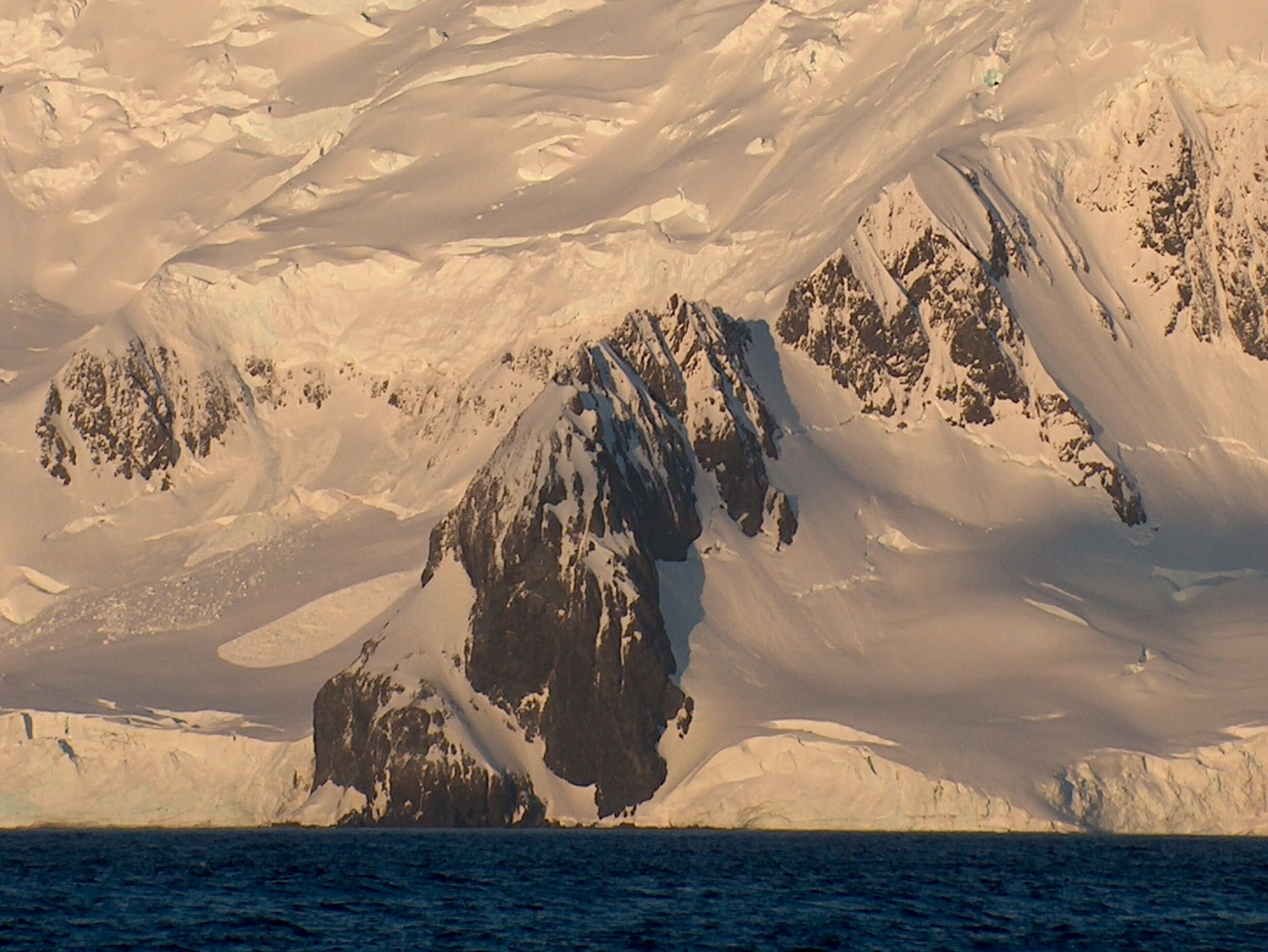
St. Evtimiy Crag from Bransfield Strait.

Topographic map of Livingston Island, Greenwich, Robert, Snow and Smith Islands.

St. Evtimiy Crag (Sv. Evtimiev Kamak \sve-'ti ev-'ti-mi-ev 'ka-m&k\) is a rocky peak of elevation 350 m in Delchev Ridge, Tangra Mountains, Livingston Island in the South Shetland Islands, Antarctica surmounting Dobrudzha Glacier to the southwest, Ropotamo Glacier to the northeast and Yantra Cove to the east.

The feature is named after the Bulgarian scholar and spiritual leader St. Euthymius of Turnovo (1327–1404).

== Location ==
The crag is located at 62°39′16″S 59°55′59″W, which is 1.45 km south of Delchev Peak, 870 m south-southeast of Asen Peak and 1.64 km east of Kuber Peak (Bulgarian mapping in 2005 and 2009 from the Tangra 2004/05 survey).

== Maps ==
- L.L. Ivanov et al. Antarctica: Livingston Island and Greenwich Island, South Shetland Islands. Scale 1:100000 topographic map. Sofia: Antarctic Place-names Commission of Bulgaria, 2005.
- L.L. Ivanov. Antarctica: Livingston Island and Greenwich, Robert, Snow and Smith Islands. Scale 1:120000 topographic map. Troyan: Manfred Wörner Foundation, 2009. ISBN 978-954-92032-6-4
