= Bulgarian toponyms in Antarctica (N) =

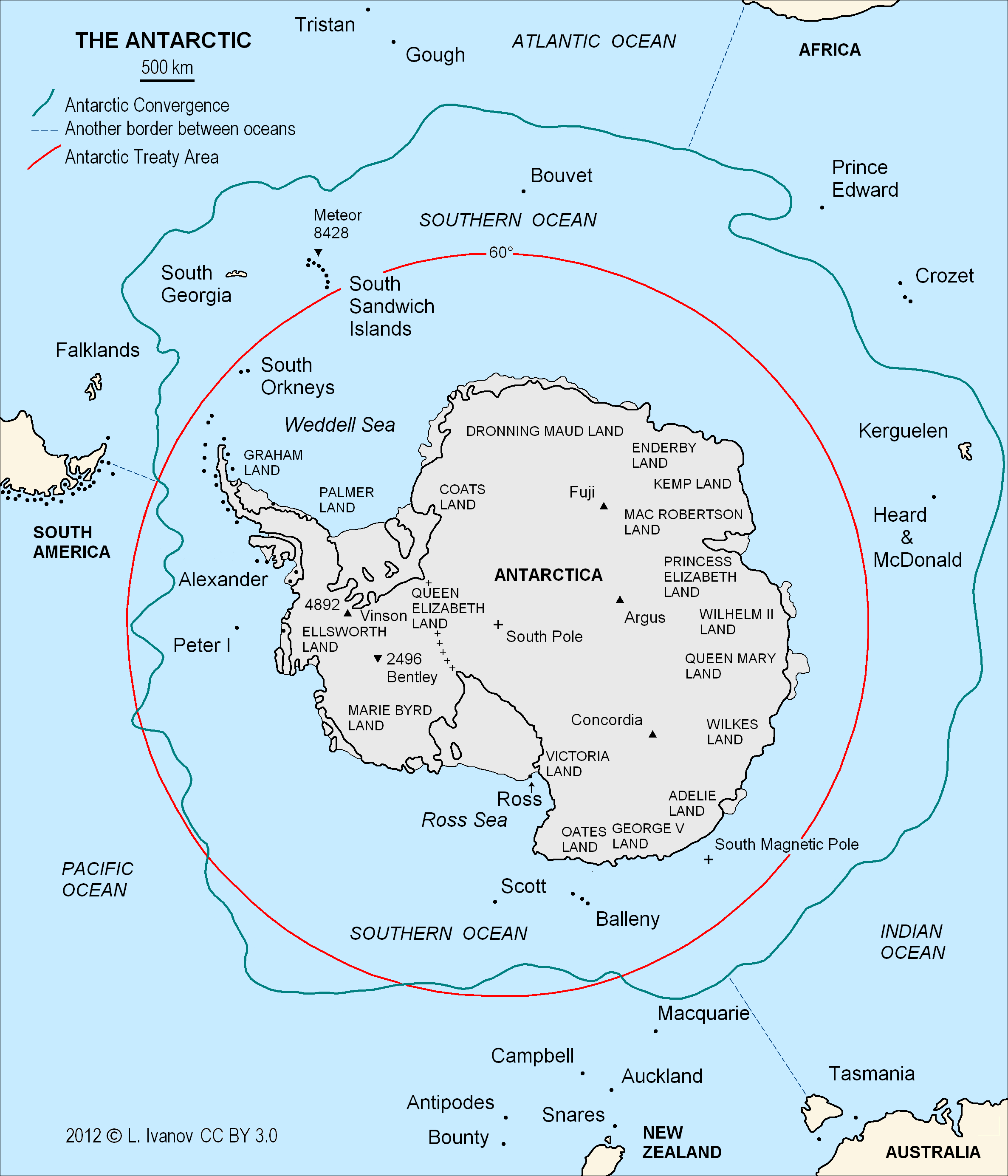
The South Polar Region.

- Nadjakov Glacier, Danco Coast
- Narechen Glacier, Alexander Island
- Narezne Glacier, Loubet Coast
- Nauchene Nunatak, Graham Coast
- Naiad Lake, Livingston Island
- Nebeska Peak, Sentinel Range
- Nebush Nunatak, Alexander Island
- Nedelya Point, Livingston Island
- Nedev Peak, Oscar II Coast
- Negovan Crag, Trinity Peninsula
- Nell Peak, Sentinel Range
- Neofit Peak, Smith Island
- Nereid Lake, Greenwich Island
- Nesebar Gap, Livingston Island
- Nesla Glacier, Graham Coast
- Nessie Rock, Livingston Island
- Nestinari Nunataks, Livingston Island
- Nestorov Island, South Orkney Islands
- Nevestino Cove, Robert Island
- Nevlya Peak, Greenwich Island
- Nevsha Cove, Graham Coast
- Nicolai Peak, Alexander Island
- Nikola Peak, Sentinel Range
- Nikolov Cove, Smith Island
- Nikopol Point, Livingston Island
- Nikudin Rock, Greenwich Island
- Nikyup Point, Trinity Peninsula
- Nishava Cove, Rugged Island
- Nosei Glacier, Smith Island
- Nove Peak, Trinity Peninsula
- Nusha Hill, Livingston Island

== See also ==
- Bulgarian toponyms in Antarctica

== Bibliography ==
- J. Stewart. Antarctica: An Encyclopedia. Jefferson, N.C. and London: McFarland, 2011. 1771 pp. ISBN 978-0-7864-3590-6
- L. Ivanov. Bulgarian Names in Antarctica. Sofia: Manfred Wörner Foundation, 2021. Second edition. 539 pp. ISBN 978-619-90008-5-4 (in Bulgarian)
- G. Bakardzhieva. Bulgarian toponyms in Antarctica. Paisiy Hilendarski University of Plovdiv: Research Papers. Vol. 56, Book 1, Part A, 2018 – Languages and Literature, pp. 104-119 (in Bulgarian)
- L. Ivanov and N. Ivanova. Bulgarian names. In: The World of Antarctica. Generis Publishing, 2022. pp. 114-115. ISBN 979-8-88676-403-1
