= Leyka Lake =

Antarctic lake

- езеро Лейката (Bulgarian)
- Location of Nelson Island in the South Shetland Islands

- Location within South Shetland Islands Location within Antarctica
- Interactive map of Leyka Lake
- Location: Baba Marta Beach, Nelson Island, South Shetland Islands
- Coordinates: 62°20′57″S 59°06′39″W
- Type: Lake
- Basin countries: Antarctica
- Max. length: 180 m (590 ft)
- Max. width: 100 m (330 ft)
- Surface area: 1.5 ha (3.7 acres)

Leyka Lake (Bulgarian: езеро Лейката, romanized: ezero Leykata, IPA: ['ɛzɛro 'lejkɐtɐ]) is the 180 m (590 ft) long in southeast–northwest direction and 100 m (330 ft) wide lake on Baba Marta Beach, Nelson Island in the South Shetland Islands, Antarctica. It has a surface area of 1.5 ha (3.7 acres) and is separated from the waters of Bransfield Strait by a 25 to 35 m (82 to 115 ft) wide strip of land. The area was visited by early 19th century sealers.

The feature is so named because of its shape supposedly resembling a watering can ('leyka' in Bulgarian).

== Location ==
Leyka Lake is centred 600 m (2,000 ft) east by south of Ross Point, 6.75 km (4.19 mi) west by south of Ivan Alexander Point and 3.28 km (2.04 mi) west-northwest of Vidaurre Point, the south extremity of the island. British mapping of the area in 1968.

== Maps ==
- Livingston Island to King George Island. Scale 1:200000. Admiralty Nautical Chart 1776. Taunton: UK Hydrographic Office, 1968
- South Shetland Islands. Scale 1:200000 topographic map No. 3373. DOS 610 - W 62 58. Tolworth, UK, 1968
- Antarctic Digital Database (ADD). Scale 1:250000 topographic map of Antarctica. Scientific Committee on Antarctic Research (SCAR). Since 1993, regularly upgraded and updated
