= Landreth Glacier =

Glacier in Antarctica

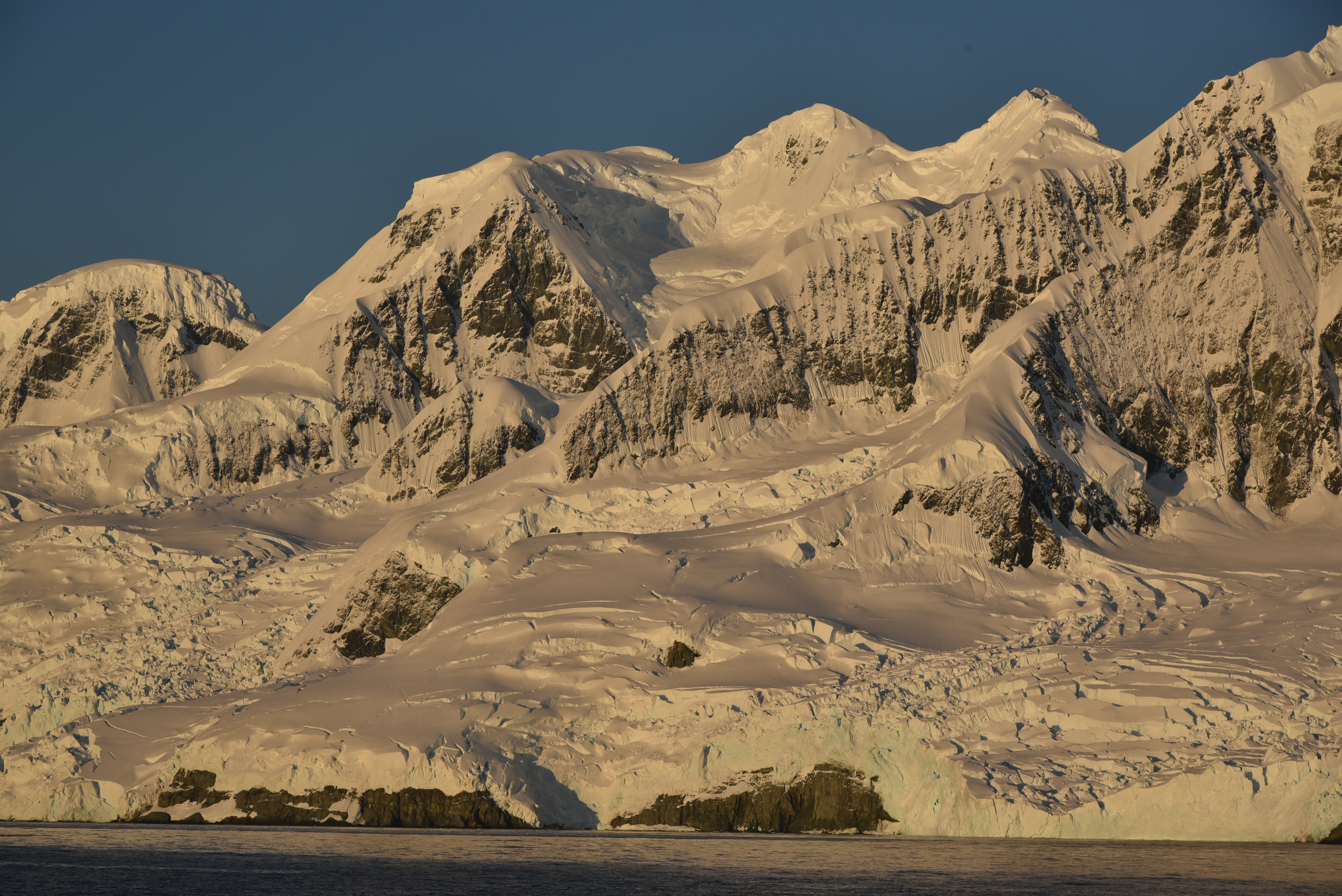
- Left to right Armira, Dragoman, Landreth Glacier and Rupite Glaciers of Smith Island

- Location within South Shetland Islands Location within Antarctica
- Location: Smith Island; South Shetland Islands
- Coordinates: 63°00′40″S 62°31′30″W
- Length: 1.2 nautical miles (2.2 km; 1.4 mi)
- Width: 0.3 nautical miles (0.56 km; 0.35 mi)
- Thickness: unknown
- Terminus: Ivan Asen Cove
- Status: unknown

Topographic map of Smith Island.

Landreth Glacier (Bulgarian: ледник Ландрет, romanized: lednik Landret, IPA: [ˈlɛdnik ˈɫandrɛt]) is the steep 2.3 km long and 600 m wide glacier on the southeast side of Imeon Range, Smith Island in the South Shetland Islands, Antarctica, which is draining southeastwards from Mount Foster between the side ridges separating it from Rupite Glacier to the north and Dragoman Glacier to the south, and flowing into Ivan Asen Cove on Bransfield Strait.

The glacier is named after the New Zealander Greg Landreth whose team made the first ascent of the island's summit Mount Foster (2105 m) on 29 January 1996.

== Location ==
Landreth Glacier is centred at 63°00′40″S 62°31′30″W. Bulgarian mapping in 2009.

== See also ==
- List of glaciers in the Antarctic
- Glaciology

== Maps ==
- Chart of South Shetland including Coronation Island, &c. from the exploration of the sloop Dove in the years 1821 and 1822 by George Powell Commander of the same. Scale ca. 1:200000. London: Laurie, 1822.
- L.L. Ivanov. Antarctica: Livingston Island and Greenwich, Robert, Snow and Smith Islands. Scale 1:120000 topographic map. Troyan: Manfred Wörner Foundation, 2010. ISBN 978-954-92032-9-5 (First edition 2009. ISBN 978-954-92032-6-4)
- South Shetland Islands: Smith and Low Islands. Scale 1:150000 topographic map No. 13677. British Antarctic Survey, 2009.
- Antarctic Digital Database (ADD). Scale 1:250000 topographic map of Antarctica. Scientific Committee on Antarctic Research (SCAR). Since 1993, regularly upgraded and updated.
- L.L. Ivanov. Antarctica: Livingston Island and Smith Island. Scale 1:100000 topographic map. Manfred Wörner Foundation, 2017. ISBN 978-619-90008-3-0
