= Latino di Camillo Orsini =

Latino Orsini (c. 1530 – c. 1580) was an Italian politician.

Born in Rome, Latino Orsini was the son of Camillo Orsini, one of the most famous condottieri of the 16th century. Latino himself had a military career: he supervised the earthwork fortifications designed by his father for Castel Sant'Angelo and built a section of the walls of Civitavecchia. During the Cyprus war, the Venetians appointed him governor of Candia (the present-day island of Crete), where he lived for more than a decade. He was also ambassador of Gregory XIII (1502–1585, Pope from 1572) to the Senate of the Venetian Republic.

One of his military inventions, the "trestles" (cavalletti, literally "little horses" in Italian) to protect infantry from cavalry attacks, was published by Vespasiano Romani in Trattato e modo di difendere la fanteria dalla cavalleria, et discorso sopra la fortification delle fosse (Naples, 1597). The Trattato del Radio Latino, an instruction manual for the instrument invented by him, was published posthumously in Rome in 1583 and 1586 with a commentary by Egnazio Danti (1536–1586).

== Honours ==
Orsini Rock in Antarctica is named after Latino di Camillo Orsini.
