= Ropotamo Glacier =

Glacier in the South Shetland Islands, Antarctica

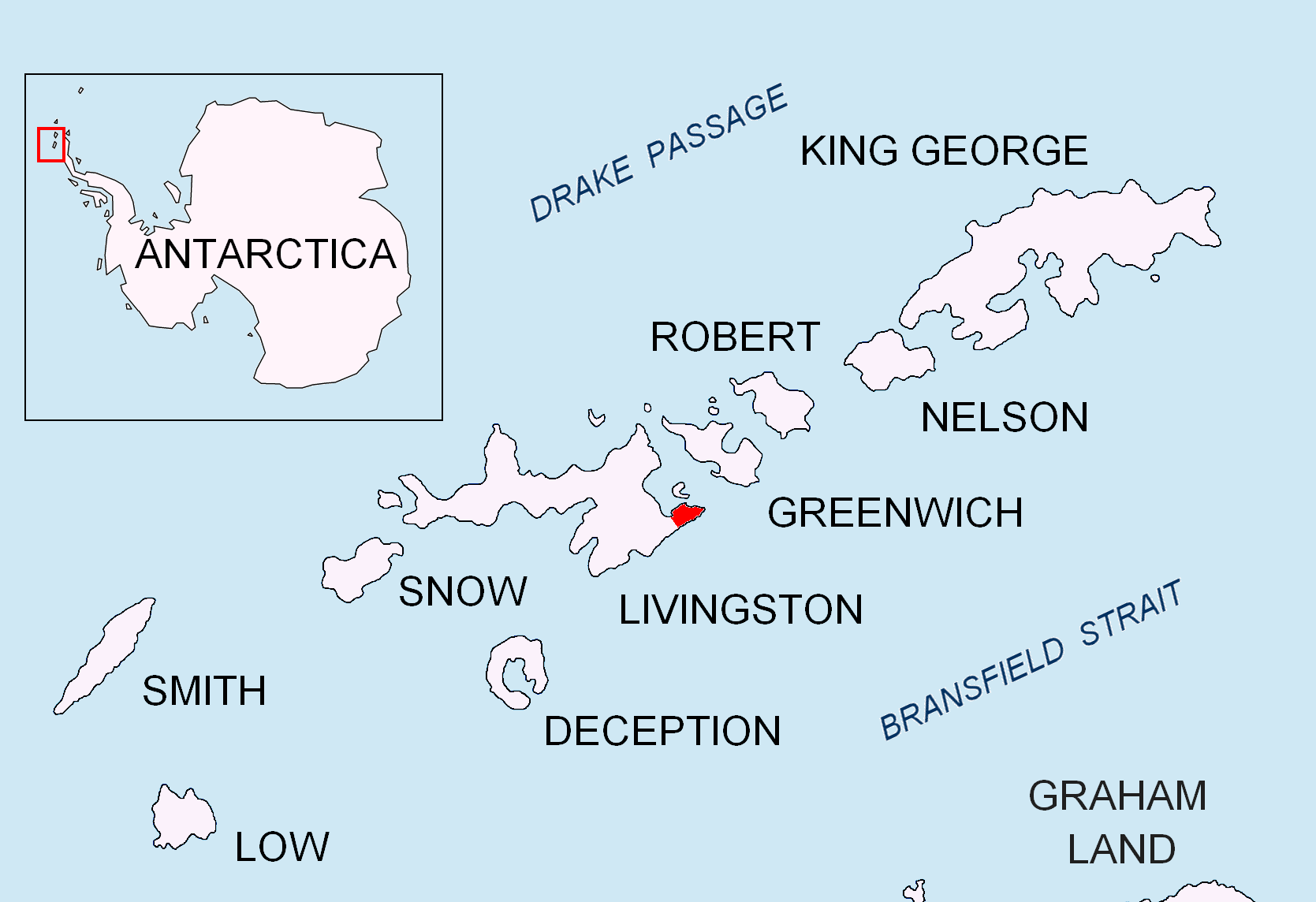
- Location of Burgas Peninsula on Livingston Island in the South Shetland Islands

- Location within South Shetland Islands Location within Antarctica
- Location: Livingston Island; South Shetland Islands
- Coordinates: 62°38′55″S 59°55′34″W
- Length: 0.5 nautical miles (0.93 km; 0.58 mi)
- Width: 0.3 nautical miles (0.56 km; 0.35 mi)
- Thickness: unknown
- Terminus: Yantra Cove
- Status: unknown

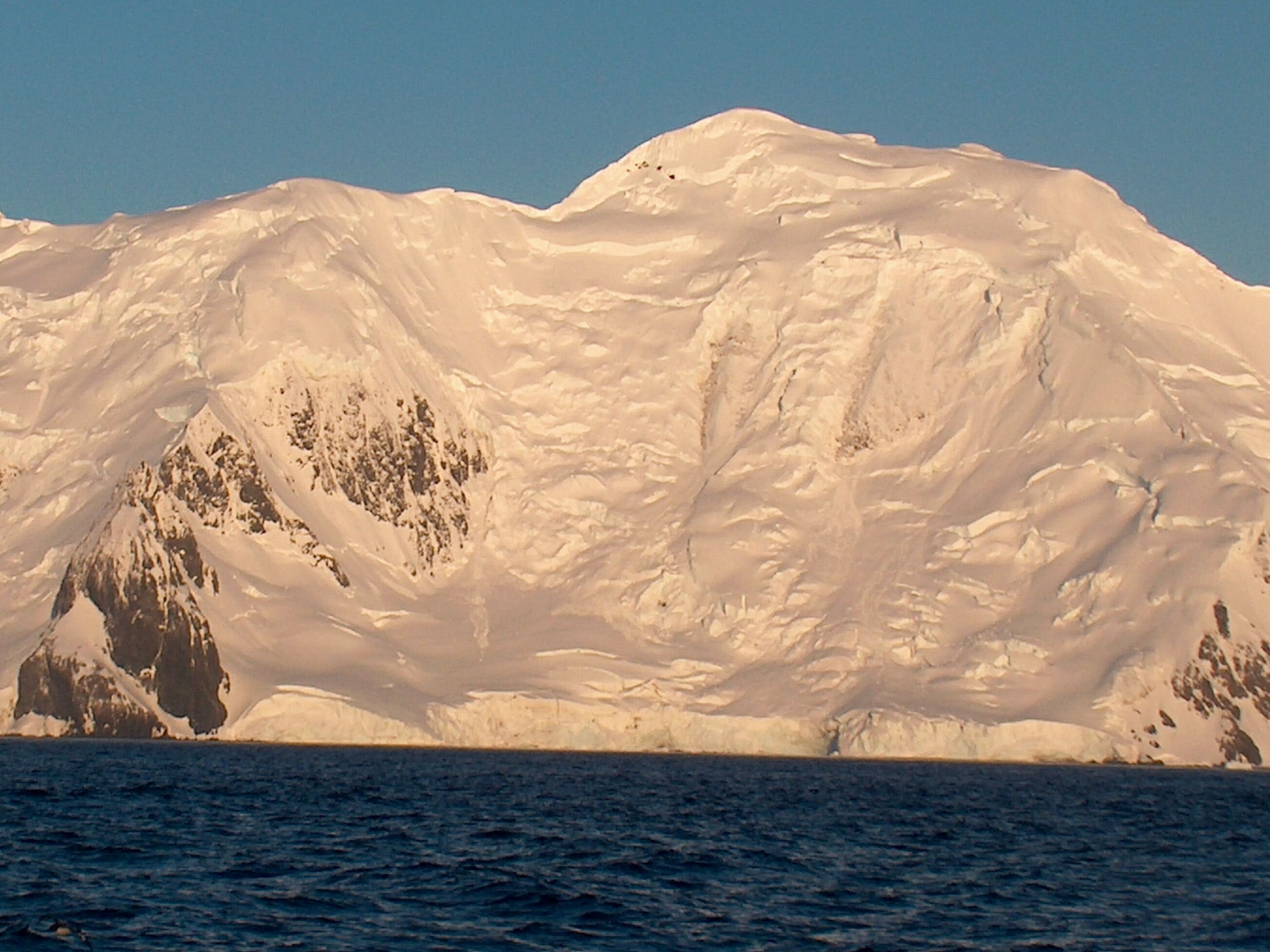
Ropotamo Glacier from Bransfield Strait, with Delchev Peak in the background

Topographic map of Livingston Island and Smith Island

Ropotamo Glacier (Bulgarian: ледник Ропотамо, romanized: lednik Ropotamo, IPA: [ˈlɛdnik ropoˈtamo]) is a glacier extending 900 m (3,000 ft) from northeast to southwest and 600 m (2,000 ft) from northwest to southeast on the Burgas Peninsula, Livingston Island in the South Shetland Islands, Antarctica. The glacier is northeast of Dobrudzha Glacier, east-southeast of Iskar Glacier, south of Sopot Ice Piedmont and southwest of Strandzha Glacier. It is bounded by Asen Peak and Delchev Peak to the northwest and north, and flows southeastwards mostly into Yantra Cove, Bransfield Strait.

The feature is named after the river Ropotamo in Bulgaria.

== See also ==
- List of glaciers in the Antarctic
- Glaciology

== Maps ==
- L.L. Ivanov et al. Antarctica: Livingston Island and Greenwich Island, South Shetland Islands. Scale 1:100000 topographic map. Sofia: Antarctic Place-names Commission of Bulgaria, 2005.
- L.L. Ivanov. Antarctica: Livingston Island and Greenwich, Robert, Snow and Smith Islands. Scale 1:120000 topographic map. Troyan: Manfred Wörner Foundation, 2009. ISBN 978-954-92032-6-4
