= Nestorov Island =

One of the South Orkney Islands in the Southern Ocean

- Map of the South Orkney Islands

- Location within Antarctica

Geography
- Location: Antarctica
- Coordinates: 60°37′26″S 45°13′29″W
- Archipelago: South Orkney Islands
- Area: 3 ha (7.4 acres)
- Length: 374 m (1227 ft)
- Width: 120 m (390 ft)

Administration
- Administered under the Antarctic Treaty System

Demographics
- Population: uninhabited

Nestorov Island (Bulgarian: Несторов остров, romanized: Nestorov ostrov, IPA: [ˈnɛstorof ˈɔstrof]) is the 374 m long in southeast-northwest direction and 120 m wide rocky island with surface area of 3 hectares (7.4 acres) lying off the northeast coast of Coronation Island in the South Orkney Islands, Antarctica. It is “named after Captain Ivan Nestorov born in town of Rila-Bulgaria (1942-2001) who compiled a 1985 report on the Southwest Atlantic fisheries (including South Georgia and South Orkneys areas) commissioned by the management of the company Ocean Fisheries – Burgas and based on his experience gained while in command of the fishing trawler Argonavt and on Soviet and Polish data. The Bulgarian fishermen, along with those of the Soviet Union, Poland and East Germany are the pioneers of modern Antarctic fishing industry.”

== Location ==
Nestorov Island is located at 60°37′26″S 45°13′29″W, which is 540 m southeast of the tip of Cape Bennett and 140 m northeast of its nearest point, and 3 km northwest of Rayner Point. British mapping in 1963.

== Maps ==
- British Antarctic Territory: South Orkney Islands. Scale 1:100000 topographic map. DOS Series 510. Surrey, England: Directorate of Overseas Surveys, 1963
- Antarctic Digital Database (ADD). Scale 1:250000 topographic map of Antarctica. Scientific Committee on Antarctic Research (SCAR). Since 1993, regularly upgraded and updated
