= Asen Peak =

Peak in the South Shetland Islands, Antarctica

Location of Tangra Mountains on Livingston Island in the South Shetland Islands

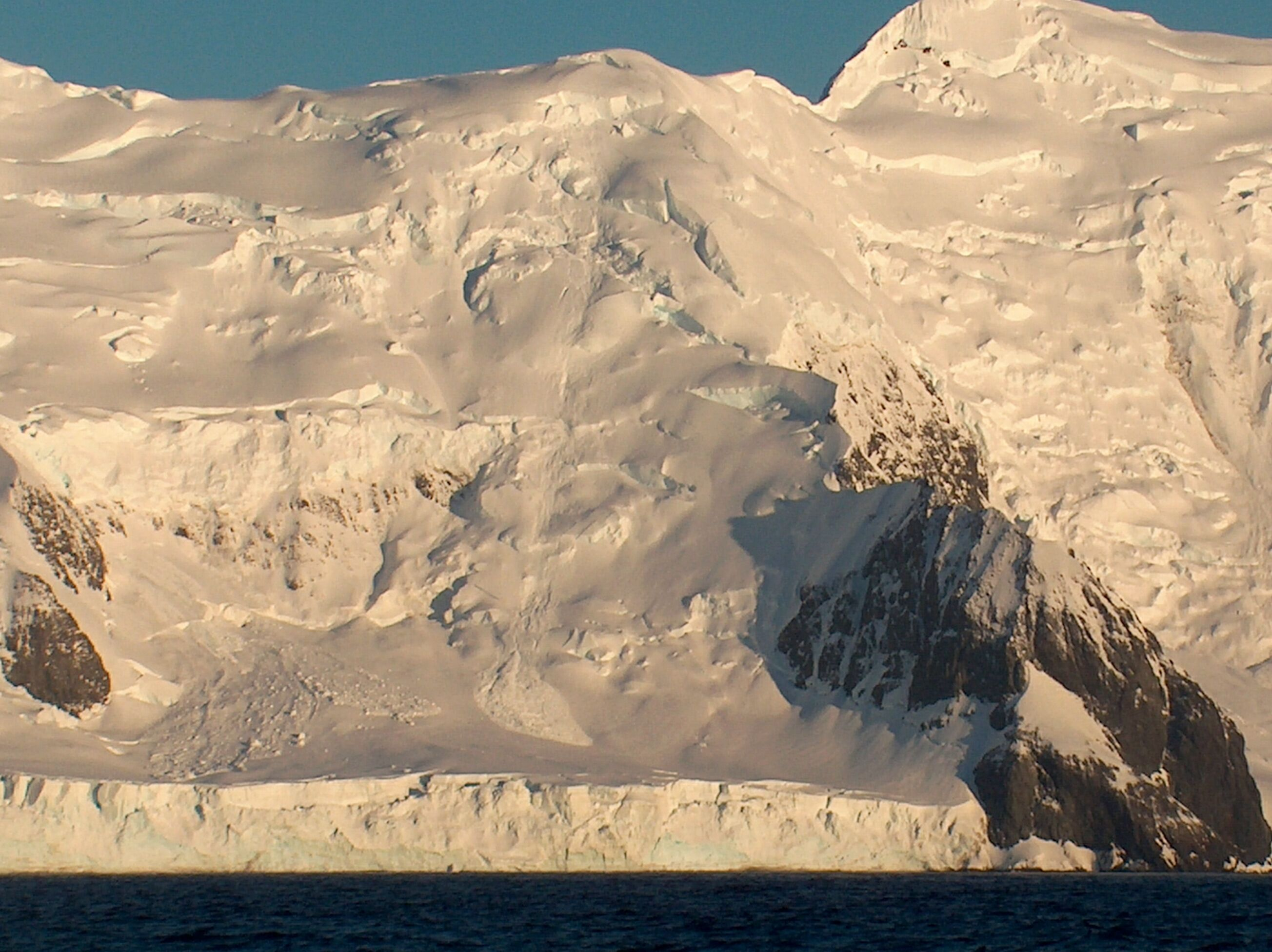
Asen Peak from Bransfield Strait, with Dobrudzha Glacier and St. Evtimiy Crag in the foreground

Topographic map of Livingston Island, Greenwich, Robert, Snow and Smith Islands

Asen Peak (Bulgarian: Аксенов връх, romanized: Asenov vrah, IPA: [ɐˈsɛnov ˈvrɤx]) is a peak in eastern Livingston Island in the South Shetland Islands, Antarctica. The peak rises to 810 m (2,660 ft) in the Delchev Ridge of the Tangra Mountains. The peak overlooks Iskar Glacier and Bruix Cove to the northwest, Ropotamo Glacier to the east-southeast and Dobrudzha Glacier to the south. The peak was named after Tsar Ivan Asen I of Bulgaria, 1190–1196 AD.

== Location ==
The peak is located at 62°38′50.5″S 59°56′25″W, which is 770 m south-southwest of Delchev Peak, 860 m east of Ruse Peak and 870 m north-northwest of St. Evtimiy Crag.

== See also ==
- Bulgarian toponyms in Antarctica
- Antarctic Place-names Commission

== Maps ==
- L.L. Ivanov et al. Antarctica: Livingston Island and Greenwich Island, South Shetland Islands. Scale 1:100000 topographic map. Sofia: Antarctic Place-names Commission of Bulgaria, 2005.
- L.L. Ivanov. Antarctica: Livingston Island and Greenwich, Robert, Snow and Smith Islands. Scale 1:120000 topographic map. Troyan: Manfred Wörner Foundation, 2009.
