= Radio latino =

A radio latino is a measuring instrument used in surveying and military engineering starting in the 16th century. It gets its name from the inventor, Latino Orsini. The radio latino can be considered a kind of geometric square.

It was a general purpose instrument that could be used for a variety of angular measurements as well as depth and inside dimension measures.

== Usage ==
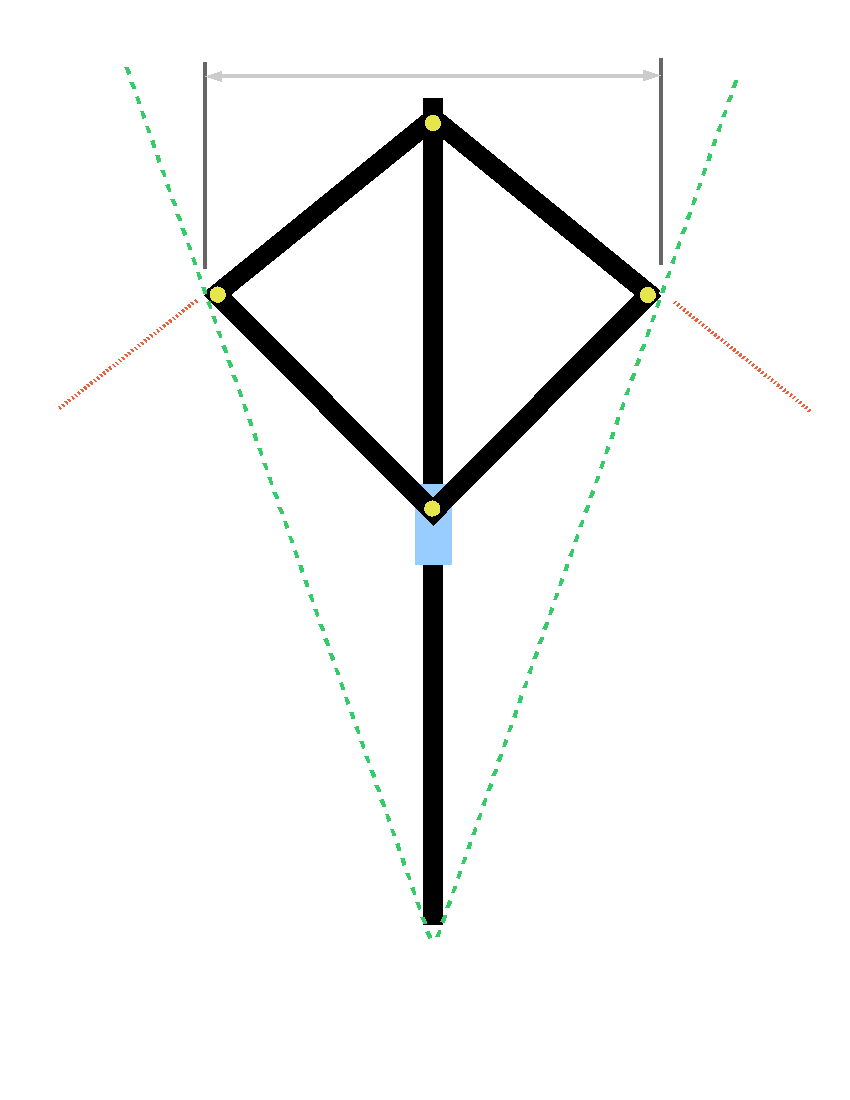
Drawing of a radio latino. The red lines represent viewing angles from the outermost components and the green lines are viewing angles from the end to the outer points on the frame. The diagram leaves out the handle on the free end of the main rod.

The slider (blue in the adjacent diagram) could move along the central rod, causing the deltoid formed by four other rods to change shape symmetrically. The end points of the rods had sights on them, allowing various sight lines to be defined. The central rod was graduated with various scales. These scales allowed the angles between the end rods (represented by the red lines in the diagram) to be determined as well as the angle with its vertex at one end of the main rod and sides (represented by the green lines in the diagram) through the outer joints of the rods.

With different graduations, one could determine or lay out:

- angles between sight lines with a degree scale.
- internal angles of regular polygons with polygon scales.
- internal diameters and dimensions (such as the inside bore of a cannon) using the distance between the outer joints (represented by the grey dimension lines in the diagram) using a length scale.
- gun elevations for cannon.
- heights of objects by measuring angles.
- shadow square calculations.
- depths from the free end of the main rod to the slider.

When folded, the radio latino would resemble a sword and was stored in a sheath or scabbard.

== Construction ==
The radio latino was usually constructed of brass. The central, main rod was graduated with multiple scales. The free end of the main rod had a handle attached. Within the handle, a small compass was mounted.

The two end-most side rods were shorter than the two attached to the slider. This permitted the end rods to be set to any angle up to 180°. The slider could move along the main rod and was used as an index for reading the engraved scales.

Each hinged vertex had a sighting vane. This permitted the instrument to be used to measure or lay out angles or other dimensions visually.
