= Orsini Rock =

Rock in Antarctica

- Location of Livingston Island in the South Shetland Islands

- Location within Antarctica Location within South Shetland Islands

Geography
- Location: Antarctica
- Coordinates: 62°35′17.3″S 60°59′03″W
- Archipelago: South Shetland Islands
- Area: 0.12 ha (0.30 acres)
- Length: 90 m (300 ft)
- Width: 46 m (151 ft)

Administration
- Administered under the Antarctic Treaty

Demographics
- Population: uninhabited

Topographic map of Livingston Island and Smith Island

Orsini Rock (Bulgarian: скала Орсини, romanized: skala Orsini, IPA: [skɐˈla orˈsini]) is the rock off the north coast of Livingston Island in the South Shetland Islands, Antarctica 90 m long in west–east direction and 46 m wide, with a surface area of 0.42 ha. The vicinity was visited by early 19th century sealers.

The feature is named after Latino Orsini (c. 1530–1580), an Italian politician and military who invented the surveying instrument radio latino; in association with other names in the area deriving from the early development or use of geodetic instruments and methods.

== Location ==
Orsini Rock is located in Barclay Bay at 62°35′17.3″S 60°59′03″W, which is 2.44 km northwest of Bilyar Point, 3.94 km northeast of Lair Point and 7.25 km east-southeast of Window Island. Bulgarian mapping in 2009 and 2017.

== See also ==
- List of Antarctic and subantarctic islands

== Maps ==
- Livingston Island to King George Island. Scale 1:200000. Admiralty Nautical Chart 1776. Taunton: UK Hydrographic Office, 1968
- South Shetland Islands. Scale 1:200000 topographic map No. 3373. DOS 610 - W 62 58. Tolworth, UK, 1968
- L. Ivanov. Antarctica: Livingston Island and Greenwich, Robert, Snow and Smith Islands. Scale 1:120000 topographic map. Troyan: Manfred Wörner Foundation, 2010. ISBN 978-954-92032-9-5 (First edition 2009. ISBN 978-954-92032-6-4)
- L. Ivanov. Antarctica: Livingston Island and Smith Island. Scale 1:100000 topographic map. Manfred Wörner Foundation, 2017. ISBN 978-619-90008-3-0
- Antarctic Digital Database (ADD). Scale 1:250000 topographic map of Antarctica. Scientific Committee on Antarctic Research (SCAR). Since 1993, regularly upgraded and updated
