= Quiroga Ridge =

Submarine ridge off Antarctica

Location of Livingston Island in the South Shetland Islands.

Topographic map of Livingston Island and Smith Island.

Quiroga Ridge (Bulgarian: хребет Кирога, 'Hrebet Quiroga' \'hre-bet ki-'ro-ga\) is a submarine ridge in False Bay, Livingston Island in the South Shetland Islands of Antarctica. It extends 2.2 km in an east-southeast to west-northwest direction between Ogosta Point on the Rozhen Peninsula and the opposite coast of Hurd Peninsula at a depth of over 50 m, with depths exceeding 100 m on both sides of the ridge. It was formed as a frontal moraine of Huntress Glacier between the 13th and 17th centuries.

The feature is named after Víctor Quiroga Martínez, captain of the Spanish ocean exploration ship BIO Hespérides that rendered logistic support to the Bulgarian Antarctic campaigns in the 1990s.

== Location ==
Quiroga Ridge is centred at 62°42′24″S 60°20′50″W. Spanish mapping in 1991.

== Maps ==
- Isla Livingston: Península Hurd. Mapa topográfico de escala 1:25000. Madrid: Servicio Geográfico del Ejército, 1991. (Map reproduced on p. 16 of the linked work)
- L.L. Ivanov. Antarctica: Livingston Island and Greenwich, Robert, Snow and Smith Islands. Scale 1:120000 topographic map. Troyan: Manfred Wörner Foundation, 2009. ISBN 978-954-92032-6-4
- Antarctic Digital Database (ADD). Scale 1:250000 topographic map of Antarctica. Scientific Committee on Antarctic Research (SCAR). Since 1993, regularly upgraded and updated.
- L.L. Ivanov. Antarctica: Livingston Island and Smith Island. Scale 1:100000 topographic map. Manfred Wörner Foundation, 2017. ISBN 978-619-90008-3-0
