= Heksagon Tarn =

Antarctic lake

- езеро Хексагона (Bulgarian)
- Location within South Shetland Islands Location within Antarctic Peninsula Location within Antarctica
- Interactive map of Heksagon Tarn
- Location: South Bay, Livingston Island, South Shetland Islands
- Coordinates: 62°38′46″S 60°34′59″W
- Type: Lake
- Basin countries: Antarctica
- Max. length: 100 m (330 ft)
- Max. width: 140 m (460 ft)
- Surface area: 1.04 ha (2.6 acres)

Heksagon Tarn (Bulgarian: езеро Хексагона, romanized: ezero Heksagona, IPA: ['ɛzɛro hɛksɐ'gɔnɐ]) is the lake on the northwest coast of South Bay, Livingston Island in the South Shetland Islands, Antarctica extending 140 m (460 ft) in west–east direction and 100 m (330 ft) in south–north direction. It has a surface area of 1.04 ha (2.6 acres) and is situated 130 m (430 ft) from the sea. The area was visited by early 19th century sealers.

The feature is so named because of its supposed hexagon shape ('heksagon' in Bulgarian).

== Location ==
Heksagon Tarn is located in central part of the island, which is 1.9 km (1.2 mi) northeast of Hannah Point and 1.37 km (0.85 mi) west-southwest of Lukovo Point. British mapping of the area in 1968 and Bulgarian in 2009 and 2017.

== Maps ==
Topographic map of Livingston Island and Smith Island

Location of Livingston Island in the South Shetland Islands

- Livingston Island to King George Island. Scale 1:200000. Admiralty Nautical Chart 1776. Taunton: UK Hydrographic Office, 1968
- South Shetland Islands. Scale 1:200000 topographic map No. 3373. DOS 610 - W 62 58. Tolworth, UK, 1968
- L. Ivanov. Antarctica: Livingston Island and Greenwich, Robert, Snow and Smith Islands. Scale 1:120000 topographic map. Troyan: Manfred Wörner Foundation, 2010. ISBN 978-954-92032-9-5 (First edition 2009. ISBN 978-954-92032-6-4)
- L. Ivanov. Antarctica: Livingston Island and Smith Island. Scale 1:100000 topographic map. Manfred Wörner Foundation, 2017. ISBN 978-619-90008-3-0
- Antarctic Digital Database (ADD). Scale 1:250000 topographic map of Antarctica. Scientific Committee on Antarctic Research (SCAR). Since 1993, regularly upgraded and updated
