= Odometer Rock =

Rock in Antarctica

- Location within South Shetland Islands Location within Antarctica

Geography
- Location: Antarctica
- Coordinates: 62°15′04.2″S 59°11′15.2″W
- Archipelago: South Shetland Islands
- Area: 0.07 ha (0.17 acres)
- Length: 40 m (130 ft)
- Width: 30 m (100 ft)

Administration
- Administered under the Antarctic Treaty

Demographics
- Population: uninhabited

Odometer Rock (Bulgarian: скала Одометър, romanized: skala Odometer, IPA: [skɐˈla odoˈmɛtər]) is the rock off the NW coast of northwest coast of Nelson Island in the South Shetland Islands, Antarctica extending 40 m in west–east direction and 30 m in south–north direction. Its surface area is 0.07 ha. The vicinity was visited by early 19th century sealers.

The feature is named after the surveying instrument odometer used for measuring the distance traveled by a vehicle; in association with other names in the area deriving from the early development or use of geodetic instruments and methods.

== Location ==
Odometer Rock is located at 62°15′04.2″S 59°11′15.2″W, which is 1.68 km north of Smilets Point, 2.58 km northeast of Folger Rock and 2.3 km west of Retamales Point. British mapping in 1968.

== See also ==
- List of Antarctic and subantarctic islands

== Maps ==
- Livingston Island to King George Island. Scale 1:200000. Admiralty Nautical Chart 1776. Taunton: UK Hydrographic Office, 1968.
- South Shetland Islands. Scale 1:200000 topographic map No. 3373. DOS 610 - W 62 58. Tolworth, UK, 1968.
- Antarctic Digital Database (ADD). Scale 1:250000 topographic map of Antarctica. Scientific Committee on Antarctic Research (SCAR). Since 1993, regularly upgraded and updated.
