= Zvegor Saddle =

Location of Sentinel Range in Western Antarctica.

Sentinel Range map.

Zvegor Saddle (Bulgarian: Звегорска седловина, romanized: Zvegorska Sedlovina \'zve-gor-ska se-dlo-vi-'na\) is the saddle of elevation 2500 m between Eyer Peak and Mount Press in Probuda Ridge, north-central Sentinel Range in Ellsworth Mountains. It is surmounting Embree Glacier to the north-northwest and Ellen Glacier to the southeast.

The saddle is named after the settlement of Zvegor in Northeastern Bulgaria.

== Location ==
Zvegor Saddle is centred at 78°08′51″S 85°59′31″W, which is 840 m north of Eyer Peak, 5.19 km northeast of Mount Anderson, 4.31 km east by north of Mount Bentley, 3.66 km south-southwest of Mount Press and 6.5 km south-southwest of Mount Todd. US mapping in 1961, updated in 1988.

== Maps ==
- Vinson Massif. Scale 1:250 000 topographic map. Reston, Virginia: US Geological Survey, 1988.
- Antarctic Digital Database (ADD). Scale 1:250000 topographic map of Antarctica. Scientific Committee on Antarctic Research (SCAR). Since 1993, regularly updated.

== Bibliography ==
- Zvegor Saddle. SCAR Composite Antarctic Gazetteer.
- Bulgarian Antarctic Gazetteer. Antarctic Place-names Commission. (details in Bulgarian, basic data in English)
