= Mount Hypothesis =

Antarctic mountain

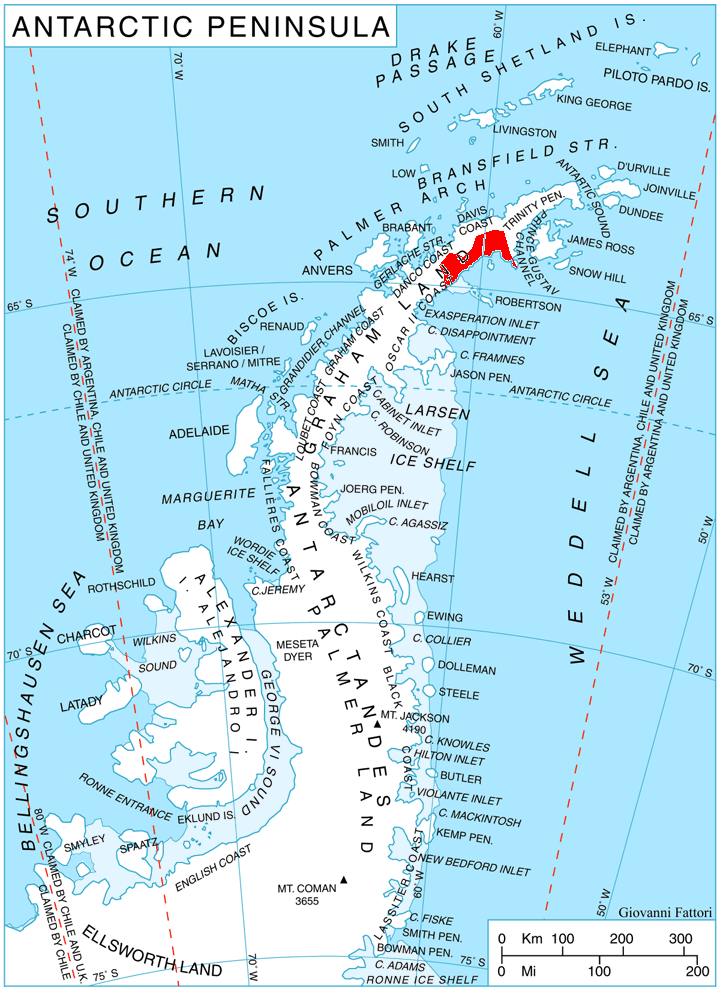
Location of Nordenskjöld Coast on Antarctic Peninsula

Mount Hypothesis (Bulgarian: връх Хипотеза, romanized: vrah Hipoteza, IPA: [ˈvrɤx xipoˈtɛzɐ]) is the mountain rising to 1094 m on Nordenskjöld Coast in Graham Land, Antarctica. It has precipitous and rocky north slopes, and surmounts Mundraga Bay on the east and south.

The feature is named in appreciation of the role of hypothesis in scientific research.

== Location ==
Mount Hypothesis is located at 64°26′41″S 60°01′27″W, which is 2.9 km southeast of Mount Elliott, 6.1 km northeast of Storgozia Nunatak and 5 km east of Zgorigrad Nunatak.

== Maps ==
- Antarctic Digital Database (ADD). Scale 1:250000 topographic map of Antarctica. Scientific Committee on Antarctic Research (SCAR). Since 1993, regularly upgraded and updated
