= Luna Island (Biscoe Islands) =

Antarctic island

- Location within Antarctica Location within Antarctic Peninsula

Geography
- Location: Antarctica
- Coordinates: 66°23′01″S 67°09′42″W
- Archipelago: Biscoe Islands
- Area: 6.55 ha (16.2 acres)
- Length: 637 m (2090 ft)
- Width: 165 m (541 ft)

Administration
- Administered under the Antarctic Treaty System

Demographics
- Population: uninhabited

Luna Island (Bulgarian: остров Луна, romanized: ostrov Luna, IPA: [ˈɔstrof ˈɫunɐ]) is the partly ice-covered rocky island in the southwest part of Biscoe Islands, Antarctica, 637 m long in southwest-northeast direction and 165 m wide, and comprising two parts divided by a passage narrowing to 5 m. Its surface area is 6.55 ha.

The feature is named after Ines Luna Aguilar from the Chilean city of Punta Arenas for her logistic support for the Bulgarian Antarctic programme.

== Location ==
Luna Island is centred at 66°23′01″S 67°09′42″W, which is 92 m west of Watkins Island and 223 m east of Belding Island. British mapping in 1976.

== Maps ==
- British Antarctic Territory. Scale 1:200000 topographic map. DOS 610 Series, Sheet W 66 66. Directorate of Overseas Surveys, UK, 1976
- Antarctic Digital Database (ADD). Scale 1:250000 topographic map of Antarctica. Scientific Committee on Antarctic Research (SCAR). Since 1993, regularly upgraded and updated

== See also ==
- List of Antarctic and subantarctic islands
