= Cape Bennett =

Cape in the South Orkney Islands, Antarctica

Cape Bennett (60°37′S 45°13′W) is a bold promontory at the northeast extremity of Coronation Island, in the South Orkney Islands.

It was discovered in December 1821 by Captain George Powell, a British sealer in the sloop Dove, and Captain Nathaniel Palmer, an American sealer in the sloop James Monroe. It was named after Powell's employer, David Bennett of Wapping, London.
