= Shadow square =

Instrument to determine linear height of an object

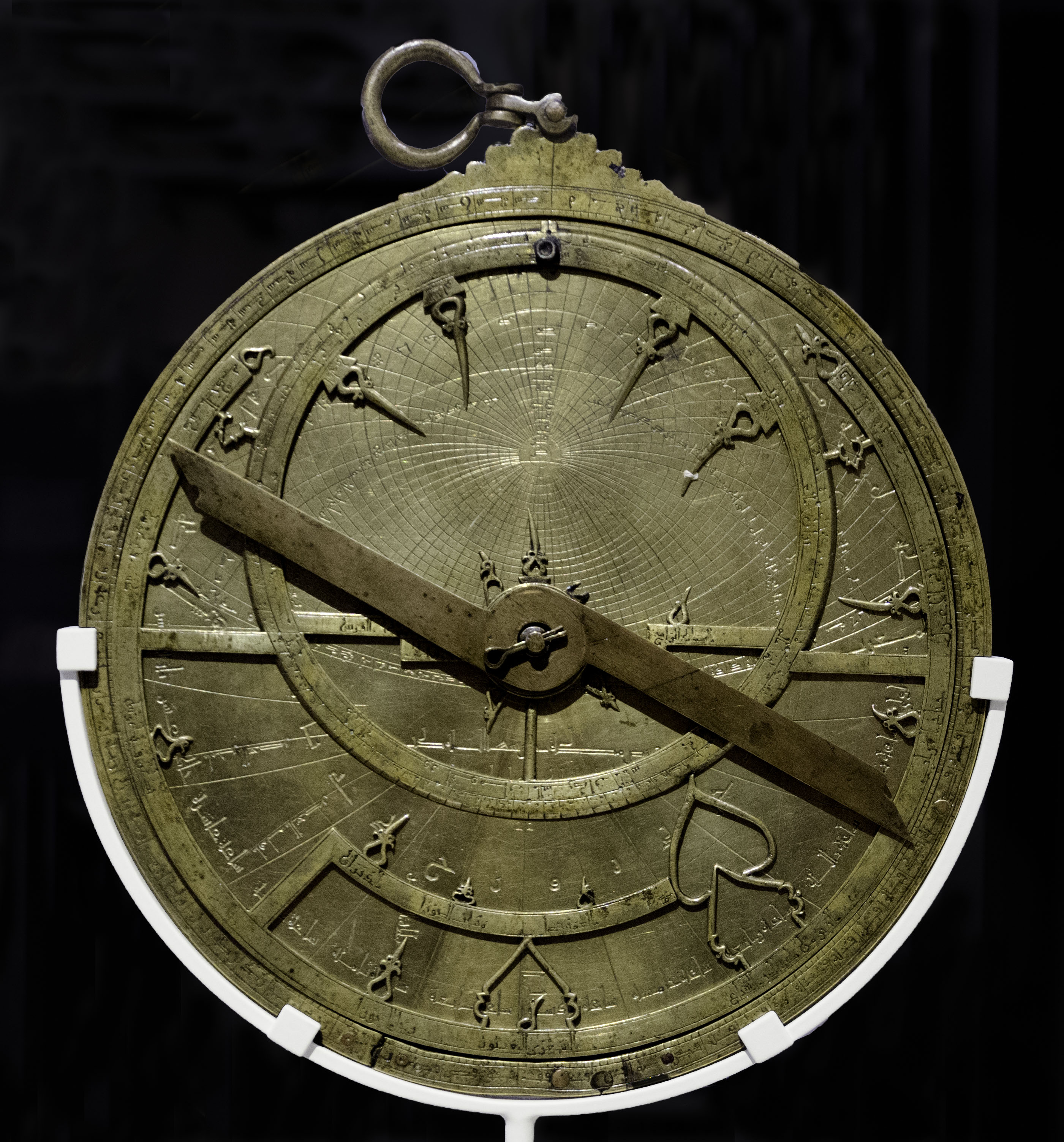
An astrolabe like the one pictured would commonly include a Shadow Box on the back.

The shadow square, also known as an altitude scale, was an instrument used to determine the linear height of an object, in conjunction with the alidade, for angular observations. An early example was described in an Arabic treatise likely dating to 9th or 10th-century Baghdad. Shadow squares are often found on the backs of astrolabes.

== Uses ==
The main use of a shadow square is to measure the linear height of an object using its shadow. It does so by simulating the ratio between an object, generally a gnomon, and its shadow. If the Sun's ray is between 0 degrees and 45 degrees the umbra versa (Vertical axis) is used, between 45 degrees and 90 degrees the umbra recta (Horizontal axis) is used and when the Sun's ray is at 45 degrees its shadow falls exactly on the umbra media (y=x) It was used during the time of medieval astronomy to determine the height of, and to track the movement of celestial bodies such as the Sun when more advanced measurement methods were not available. These methods can still be used today to determine the altitude, with reference to the horizon, of any visible celestial body.

A gnomon works as a tool to produce a shadow for measurement.

== Gnomon ==
A gnomon is used along with a shadow box commonly. A gnomon is a stick placed vertically in a sunny place so that it casts a shadow that can be measured. Studying the shadow of the gnomon provides information about the motion of the Sun. Gnomons were most likely independently discovered by many ancient civilizations, but it is known that they were used in the 5th century BC in Greece. Most likely for the measurement of the winter and summer solstices.Herodotus says in his Histories written around 450 B.C., that the Greeks learned the use of the gnomon from the Babylonians.

== Examples ==
If a shadow of a human being is 4 feet long then what is the altitude of the sun? This problem can be solved through the use of the shadow box. The shadow box is divided in half, one half is calibrated by sixes the other by tens. Because it is a shadow cast by the human body the sixes are more convenient. By moving the alidade to the four (the same as the shadows length) and then reading the altitude scale shows the Sun is at an altitude of 56.3 degrees.

The Shadow box can also be used with long shadows using a slightly modified method. If a human's shadow is 18 feet long, then what is the altitude of the Sun? Using the sixes side of the shadow box (using a human body as measurement) the longest shadow marked on a shadow box is six feet. This creates a problem any time the shadow is longer than the gnomon that casts it. By performing a simple calculation, by figuring out how tall a gnomon would be if it cast a six-foot shadow in the same situation, in this situation the gnomon would be only two feet tall in order to cast a six-foot shadow. If the shadow is longer than the gnomon, first turn the astrolabe upside down then set the alidade at two, the height of the projected gnomon, then read off the altitude from the altitude scale. It should read that the Sun is at 19 degrees above the horizon.
