= Hvoyna Cove =

Body of water in Graham Land, Antarctica

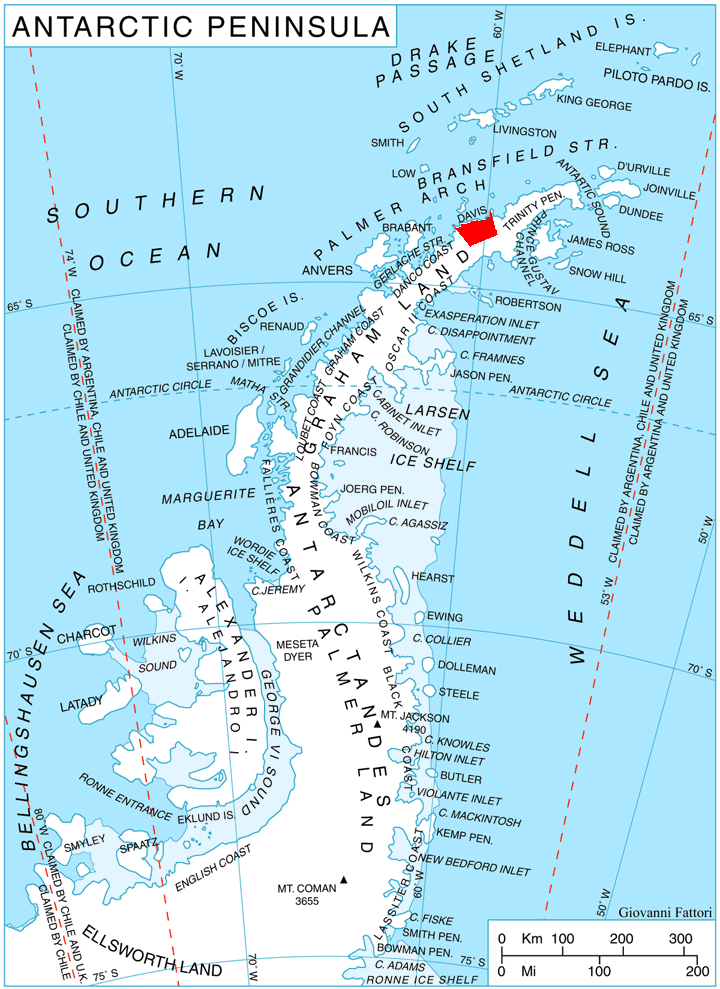
Location of Davis Coast.

Hvoyna Cove (Bulgarian: залив Хвойна, ‘Zaliv Hvoyna’ \'za-liv 'hvoy-na\) is the 1.7 km wide cove indenting for 1 km Davis Coast in Graham Land, Antarctica. It is part of Jordanoff Bay entered east of Wennersgaard Point and west of Kamenar Point. The cove is named after the settlement of Hvoyna in Southern Bulgaria.

== Location ==
Hvoyna Cove is centred at 63°51′00″S 59°55′20″W. German-British mapping in 1996.

== Maps ==
- Trinity Peninsula. Scale 1:250000 topographic map No. 5697. Institut für Angewandte Geodäsie and British Antarctic Survey, 1996.
- Antarctic Digital Database (ADD). Scale 1:250000 topographic map of Antarctica. Scientific Committee on Antarctic Research (SCAR). Since 1993, regularly upgraded and updated.
