= Bulgarian toponyms in Antarctica =

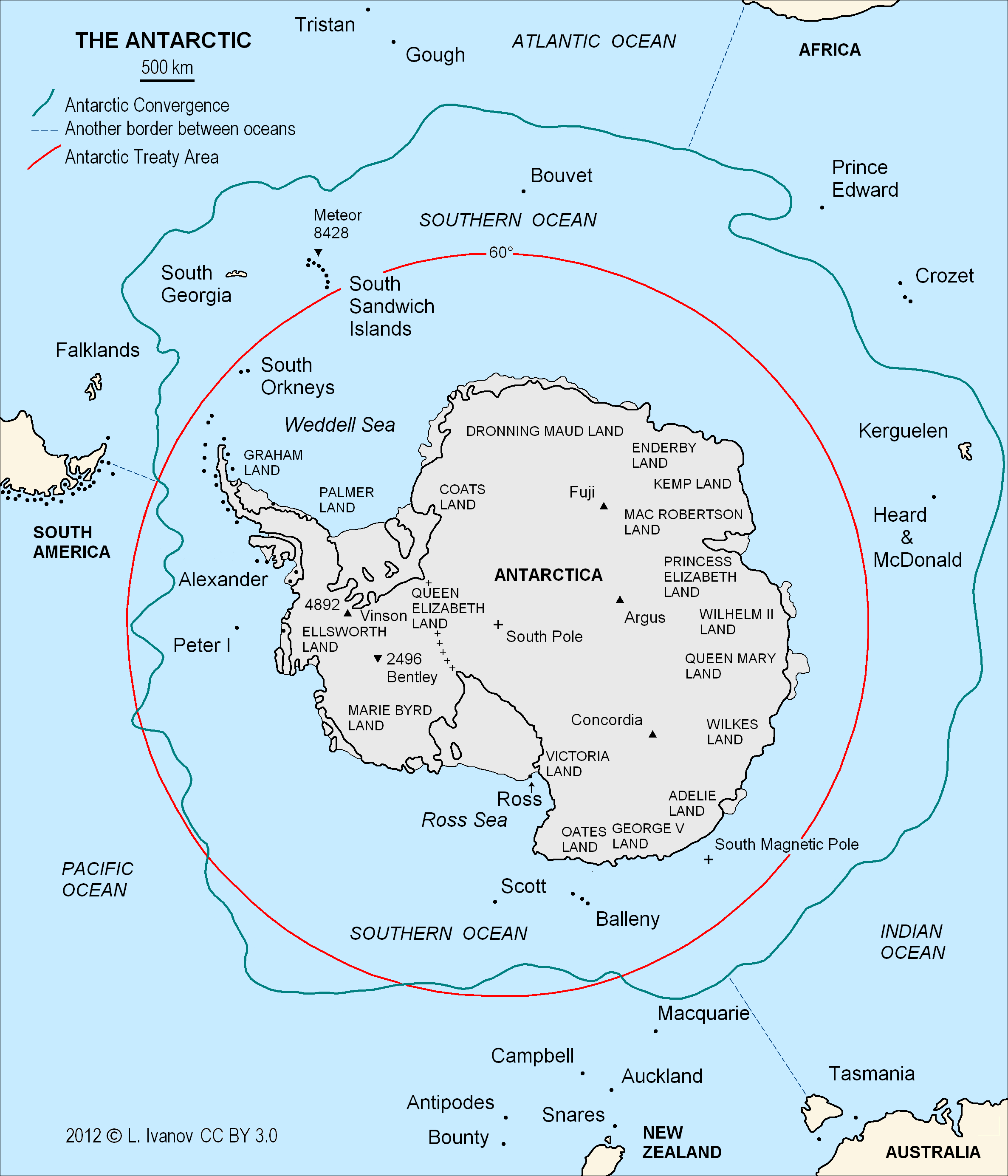
The South Polar Region

Bulgarian toponyms in Antarctica are approved by the Antarctic Place-names Commission in compliance with its Toponymic Guidelines, and formally given by the President of the Republic according to the Bulgarian Constitution and the established international and Bulgarian practice. Place naming is confined to nameless geographic features situated in the Antarctic Treaty area, the region south of the parallel 60 degrees south latitude.

Details of the Bulgarian Antarctic toponyms are published by the websites of the commission and the international Composite Gazetteer of Antarctica maintained by the Scientific Committee on Antarctic Research (SCAR).

Alphabetical lists of the relevant place names:

- A
- B
- C
- D
- E
- F
- G
- H
- I
- J
- K
- L
- M
- N
- O
- P
- Q
- R
- S
- T
- U
- V
- W
- Y
- Z

== See also ==
- Antarctic Place-names Commission
- Composite Gazetteer of Antarctica
- Bulgarian placename etymology

== Bibliography ==
- J. Stewart. Antarctica: An Encyclopedia. Jefferson, N.C. and London: McFarland, 2011. 1771 pp. ISBN 978-0-7864-3590-6
- L. Ivanov. Bulgarian Names in Antarctica. Sofia: Manfred Wörner Foundation, 2021. Second edition. 539 pp. ISBN 978-619-90008-5-4 (in Bulgarian)
- G. Bakardzhieva. Bulgarian toponyms in Antarctica. Paisiy Hilendarski University of Plovdiv: Research Papers. Vol. 56, Book 1, Part A, 2018 – Languages and Literature, pp. 104-119 (in Bulgarian)
- L. Ivanov and N. Ivanova. Bulgarian names. In: The World of Antarctica. Generis Publishing, 2022. pp. 114-115. ISBN 979-8-88676-403-1
