= Zikoniya Island =

Island in the Palmer Archipelago, Antarctica

- Location within Antarctica Location within Antarctic Peninsula

Geography
- Location: Antarctica
- Coordinates: 63°49′54.5″S 60°59′58″W
- Archipelago: Palmer Archipelago
- Length: 140 m (460 ft)
- Width: 120 m (390 ft)

Administration
- Antarctica
- Administered under the Antarctic Treaty System

Demographics
- Population: uninhabited

Zikoniya Island (Bulgarian: остров Цикония, romanized: ostrov Tsikoniya, IPA: [ˈɔstrof t͡siˈkɔnijɐ]) is the 140 m long in west–east direction and 120 m wide rocky island lying off Spert Island on the southwest side of Trinity Island in the Palmer Archipelago, Antarctica. It is “named after the ocean fishing trawler Zikoniya of the Bulgarian company Ocean Fisheries – Burgas whose ships operated in the waters of South Georgia, Kerguelen, the South Orkney Islands, South Shetland Islands and Antarctic Peninsula from 1970 to the early 1990s. The Bulgarian fishermen, along with those of the Soviet Union, Poland and East Germany are the pioneers of modern Antarctic fishing industry.”

== Location ==
Zikoniya Island is located at 63°49′54.5″S 60°59′58″W, which is 4.75 km northeast of Bulnes Point, 1.38 km northwest of Melanita Island and 7.6 km west of Romero Point. British mapping in 1978.

== Maps ==
- British Antarctic Territory. Scale 1:200000 topographic map. DOS 610 – W 63 60. Tolworth, UK, 1978.
- Antarctic Digital Database (ADD). Scale 1:250000 topographic map of Antarctica. Scientific Committee on Antarctic Research (SCAR). Since 1993, regularly upgraded and updated.
