= Eyer Peak =

Mountain in Antarctica

Location of Sentinel Range in Western Antarctica.

Sentinel Range map.

Eyer Peak (Bulgarian: връх Айер, romanized: vrah Ayer, IPA: [ˈvrɤx ɐˈjɛr]) is the peak rising to 3,358 metres (11,017 ft) in Probuda Ridge, north-central Sentinel Range in Ellsworth Mountains, Antarctica. It is separated from the north-northeastern part of Probuda Ridge by the 2,500 metres (8,200 ft) high Zvegor Saddle, and surmounts Embree Glacier to the northwest and north, and Ellen Glacier to the southeast. First ascent by the Australian-Chilean team of Damien Gildea on 31 December 2006.

The peak is named after the Swiss Bulgarian pedagogue Louis-Emil Eyer (1865-1916), founder of the sports movement in Bulgaria.

== Location ==
Eyer Peak is located at 78°09′18″S 85°59′45″W, which is 4.48 kilometres (2.78 mi) northeast of Mount Anderson, 4.25 kilometres (2.64 mi) east by south of Mount Bentley and 4.42 kilometres (2.75 mi) km south-southwest of Mount Press. US mapping in 1961, updated in 1988.

== See also ==
- Mountains in Antarctica

== Maps ==
- Vinson Massif. Scale 1:250 000 topographic map. Reston, Virginia: US Geological Survey, 1988.
- Antarctic Digital Database (ADD). Scale 1:250000 topographic map of Antarctica. Scientific Committee on Antarctic Research (SCAR). Since 1993, regularly updated.
