= Urania Cove =

Antarctic cove

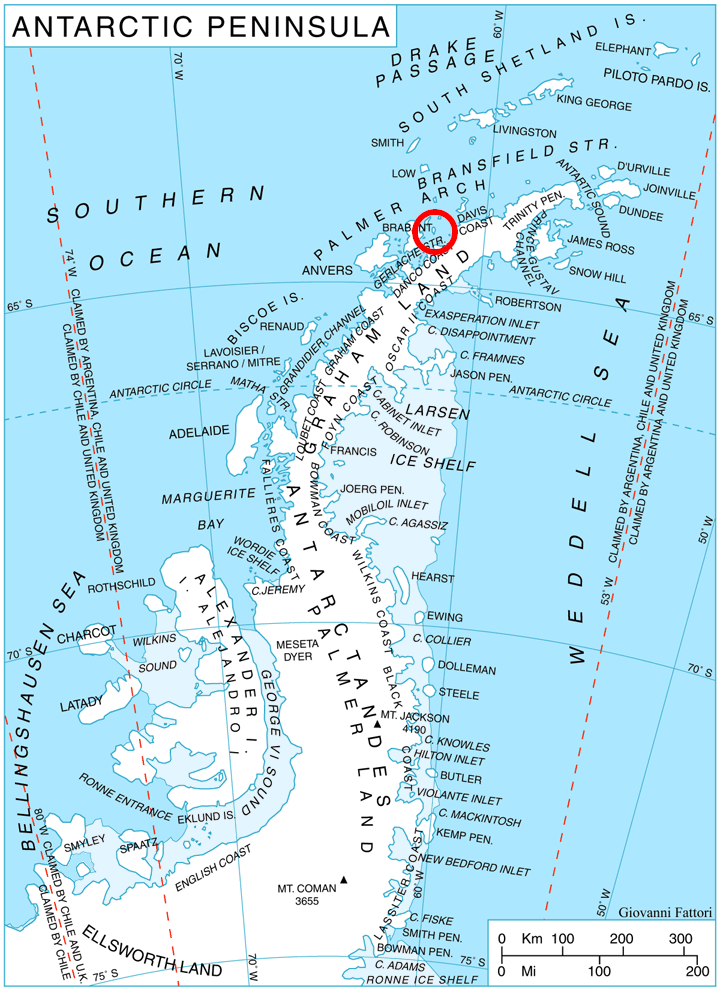
Location of Two Hummock Island in the Antarctic Peninsula region.

Urania Cove (Bulgarian: залив Урания, romanized: zaliv Uraniya, IPA: [ˈzalif uˈranijɐ]) is the 1.6 km wide cove indenting for 1.35 km the west coast of Two Hummock Island in the Palmer Archipelago, Antarctica north of Buache Peak and west of Modev Peak.

The feature is named after Urania, the muse of astronomy in Greek mythology.

== Location ==
Urania Cove is centred at 64°07′40″S 61°44′30″W, which is 4 km south-southwest of Wauters Point, 3.5 km southwest of Butrointsi Point and 2.4 km north-northeast of Palaver Point. British mapping in 1978.

== Maps ==
- British Antarctic Territory. Scale 1:200000 topographic map. DOS 610 Series, Sheet W 64 60. Directorate of Overseas Surveys, UK, 1978.
- Antarctic Digital Database (ADD). Scale 1:250000 topographic map of Antarctica. Scientific Committee on Antarctic Research (SCAR). Since 1993, regularly upgraded and updated
