= Yantra Cove =

Cove in the South Shetland Islands, Antarctica

Location of Livingston Island in the South Shetland Islands.

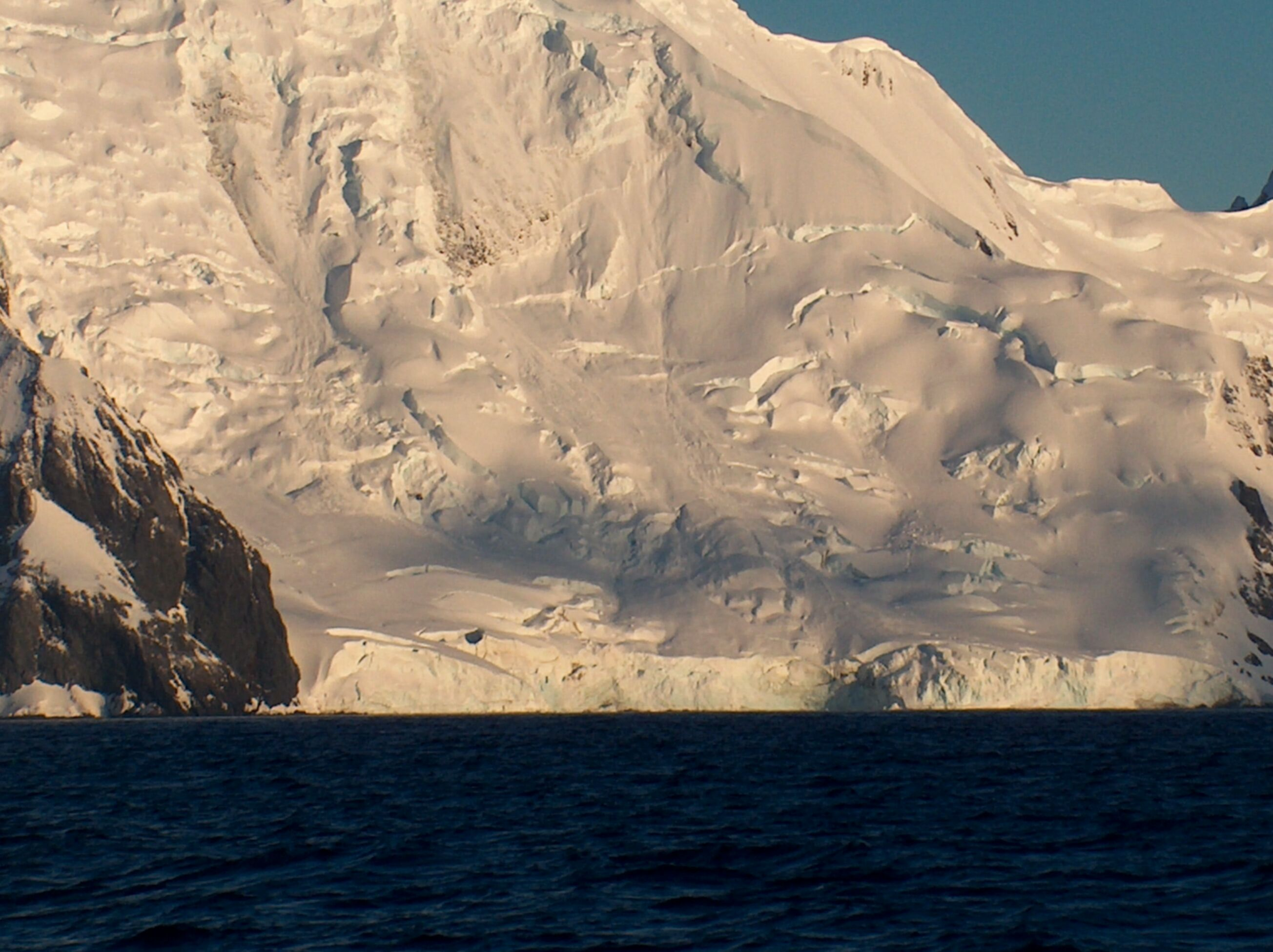
Yantra Cove from Bransfield Strait.

Topographic map of Livingston Island and Smith Island

Yantra Cove (Bulgarian: залив Янтра, romanized: zaliv Yantra, IPA: [ˈzalif ˈjantrɐ]) is a 560 m wide cove in the south coast of the Burgas Peninsula of Livingston Island in the South Shetland Islands, Antarctica east of St. Evtimiy Crag, southeast of Asen Peak and south-southeast of Delchev Peak. The feature was named after the Yantra River in northern Bulgaria.

== Location ==
The cove's midpoint is located at 62°39′08″S 59°55′20″W. Bulgarian survey Tangra 2004/05 and mapping in 2005 and 2009).

== Maps ==
- L.L. Ivanov et al. Antarctica: Livingston Island and Greenwich Island, South Shetland Islands. Scale 1:100000 topographic map. Sofia: Antarctic Place-names Commission of Bulgaria, 2005.
- L.L. Ivanov. Antarctica: Livingston Island and Greenwich, Robert, Snow and Smith Islands. Scale 1:120000 topographic map. Troyan: Manfred Wörner Foundation, 2010. ISBN 978-954-92032-9-5 (First edition 2009. ISBN 978-954-92032-6-4)
- Antarctic Digital Database (ADD). Scale 1:250000 topographic map of Antarctica. Scientific Committee on Antarctic Research (SCAR). Since 1993, regularly updated.
- L.L. Ivanov. Antarctica: Livingston Island and Smith Island. Scale 1:100000 topographic map. Manfred Wörner Foundation, 2017. ISBN 978-619-90008-3-0
