= Baba Marta Beach =

Antarctic beach

Location of Nelson Island in the South Shetland Islands

Baba Marta Beach (Bulgarian: бряг Баба Марта, romanized: bryag Baba Marta, IPA: [ˈbrʲag ˈbabɐ ˈmartɐ]) is the ice-free beach on the south coast of Nelson Island in the South Shetland Islands, Antarctica, extending 1.8 km eastwards from Ross Point. Its surface area is 43 ha. The area was visited by early 19th century sealers.

The beach is named after the Bulgarian mythical figure Baba (Grandma) Marta associated with winter, in relation to working in the harsh Antarctic environment.

== Location ==
Baba Marta Beach is centred at 62°20′55″S 59°06′09″W, which is 4.1 km southeast of The Toe, 6.3 km west of Ivan Alexander Point and 2.85 km west-northwest of Vidaurre Point, the south extremity of the island. British mapping of the area in 1968.

== Maps ==
- Livingston Island to King George Island. Scale 1:200000. Admiralty Nautical Chart 1776. Taunton: UK Hydrographic Office, 1968
- South Shetland Islands. Scale 1:200000 topographic map No. 3373. DOS 610 - W 62 58. Tolworth, UK, 1968
- Antarctic Digital Database (ADD). Scale 1:250000 topographic map of Antarctica. Scientific Committee on Antarctic Research (SCAR). Since 1993, regularly upgraded and updated
