= Ivan Asen Cove =

Location of Smith Island in the South Shetland Islands.

Topographic map of Smith Island.

Ivan Asen Cove (Bulgarian: залив Иван Асен, ‘Zaliv Ivan Asen’ \'za-liv i-'van a-'sen\) is the 1.16 km wide cove on Osmar Strait indenting for 800 m the southeast coast of Smith Island in the South Shetland Islands, Antarctica, and entered northeast of Ivan Asen Point. Its head is fed by Dragoman Glacier.

The feature takes its name from the adjacent Ivan Asen Point.

== Location ==
Ivan Asen Cove is located at 63°01′20″S 62°31′20″W, which is 13 km northeast of Cape James. Bulgarian mapping in 2009 and 2010.

== Maps ==
- Chart of South Shetland including Coronation Island, &c. from the exploration of the sloop Dove in the years 1821 and 1822 by George Powell Commander of the same. Scale ca. 1:200000. London: Laurie, 1822.
- L.L. Ivanov. Antarctica: Livingston Island and Greenwich, Robert, Snow and Smith Islands. Scale 1:120000 topographic map. Troyan: Manfred Wörner Foundation, 2010. ISBN 978-954-92032-9-5 (First edition 2009. ISBN 978-954-92032-6-4)
- South Shetland Islands: Smith and Low Islands. Scale 1:150000 topographic map No. 13677. British Antarctic Survey, 2009.
- Antarctic Digital Database (ADD). Scale 1:250000 topographic map of Antarctica. Scientific Committee on Antarctic Research (SCAR). Since 1993, regularly upgraded and updated.
- L.L. Ivanov. Antarctica: Livingston Island and Smith Island. Scale 1:100000 topographic map. Manfred Wörner Foundation, 2017. ISBN 978-619-90008-3-0
