= Ruen =

Ruen Руен
- Location of Ruen
- Coordinates: 42°48′N 27°17′E
- Country: Bulgaria
- Provinces (Oblast): Burgas

Government
  - Mayor: Durhan Mustafa

Population (2008)
  - Total: 2,423
- Time zone: UTC+2 (EET)
  - Summer (DST): UTC+3 (EEST)
- Postal Code: 8540
- Area code: 05944

Ruen (Bulgarian: Руен, pronounced [ˈruɛn]; Turkish: Ulanlı) is a village in southeastern Bulgaria, part of Burgas Province. It is the administrative centre of Ruen municipality, which lies in the northern part of Burgas Province.

== Municipality ==
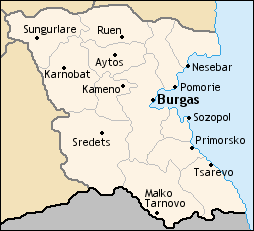
Map of Burgas Province

Ruen municipality includes the following 41 places:

- Bilka
- Cheresha
- Dobra Polyana
- Dobromir
- Daskotna
- Dropla
- Dyulya
- Kamenyak
- Karavelyovo
- Listets
- Lyulyakovo
- Mrezhichko
- Planinitsa
- Podgorets
- Preobrazhentsi
- Pripek
- Prosenik
- Razboyna
- Razhitsa
- Rechitsa
- Rozhden
- Rudina
- Ruen
- Rupcha
- Shivarovo
- Sini Rid
- Skalak
- Snezha
- Snyagovo
- Sokolets
- Sredna Mahala
- Struya
- Topchiysko
- Tranak
- Vishna
- Vresovo
- Yabalchevo
- Yasenovo
- Zaimchevo
- Zaychar
- Zvezda

The population of the municipality is predominantly Turkish (see Turks in Bulgaria), with some Bulgarians, Roma and Pomaks.
