= Mount Hleven =

Mountain in Ellsworth Land, Antarctica

Location of Sentinel Range in Western Antarctica.

Map of Sentinel Range.

Mount Hleven (Bulgarian: връх Хлевен, romanized: vrah Hleven, IPA: [ˈvrɤx ˈxlɛvɛn]) is the ice-covered peak rising to 1574 m in Bangey Heights on the east side of the main ridge of north-central Sentinel Range in Ellsworth Mountains, Antarctica. It surmounts Padala Glacier to the west, lower Embree Glacier to the north and lower Kopsis Glacier to the southeast.

The peak is named after Hleven Peak in Pirin Mountain, Bulgaria

== Location ==
Mount Hleven is located at 78°01′53.3″S 85°21′58″W, which is 9.63 km northeast of Bezden Peak, 5.66 km east-southeast of Mount Schmid, 6.37 km southwest of Mount Tegge, and 7.83 km northwest of Zimornitsa Peak in Maglenik Heights. US mapping in 1961 and 1988.

== See also ==
- Mountains in Antarctica

== Maps ==
- Vinson Massif. Scale 1:250 000 topographic map. Reston, Virginia: US Geological Survey, 1988.
- Antarctic Digital Database (ADD). Scale 1:250000 topographic map of Antarctica. Scientific Committee on Antarctic Research (SCAR). Since 1993, regularly updated.
