= Ichera Peak =

Mountain in Antarctica

Location of Sentinel Range in Western Antarctica.

Sentinel Range map.

Ichera Peak (Bulgarian: връх Ичера, romanized: vrah Ichera, IPA: [ˈvrɤx it͡ʃɛˈra]) is the peak rising to 2642 m in Maglenik Heights, north-central Sentinel Range in Ellsworth Mountains, Antarctica. It is overlooking Ellen Glacier to the southwest and Young Glacier to the northeast.

The peak is named after the settlement of Ichera in Eastern Bulgaria.

== Location ==
Ichera Peak is located at 78°10′35″S 85°20′13″W, which is 18.88 km east of Mount Anderson, 4.21 km south-southeast of Mount Gozur, 9.78 km south-southwest of Zimornitsa Peak, 15.18 km west-northwest of Mount Besch and 5.93 km north-northwest of Chapman Peak. US mapping in 1961, updated in 1988.

== See also ==
- Mountains in Antarctica

== Maps ==
- Vinson Massif. Scale 1:250 000 topographic map. Reston, Virginia: US Geological Survey, 1988.
- Antarctic Digital Database (ADD). Scale 1:250000 topographic map of Antarctica. Scientific Committee on Antarctic Research (SCAR). Since 1993, regularly updated.
