= Fucha Peak =

Peak of the Bangey Heights in Antarctica

Location of Sentinel Range in Western Antarctica.

Sentinel Range map.

Fucha Peak (Bulgarian: връх Фуча, romanized: vrah Fucha, IPA: [ˈvrɤx ˈfut͡ʃɐ]) is the peak rising to 2604 m in the central part of Bangey Heights, north-central Sentinel Range in Ellsworth Mountains, Antarctica. It surmounts Marsa Glacier to the west and Padala Glacier to the southeast.

The peak is named after the settlements of Mala (Little) Fucha and Golema (Great) Fucha in Western Bulgaria.

== Location ==
Fucha Peak is located at 78°02′16″S 85°37′15″W, which is 2.45 km northeast of Golemani Peak, 2.66 km east of Oreshak Peak, 2.8 km south by west of Mount Schmid, and 11.43 km northwest of Zimornitsa Peak. US mapping in 1961, updated in 1988.

== See also ==
- Mountains in Antarctica

== Maps ==
- Vinson Massif. Scale 1:250 000 topographic map. Reston, Virginia: US Geological Survey, 1988.
- Antarctic Digital Database (ADD). Scale 1:250000 topographic map of Antarctica. Scientific Committee on Antarctic Research (SCAR). Since 1993, regularly updated.
