= Veshka Point =

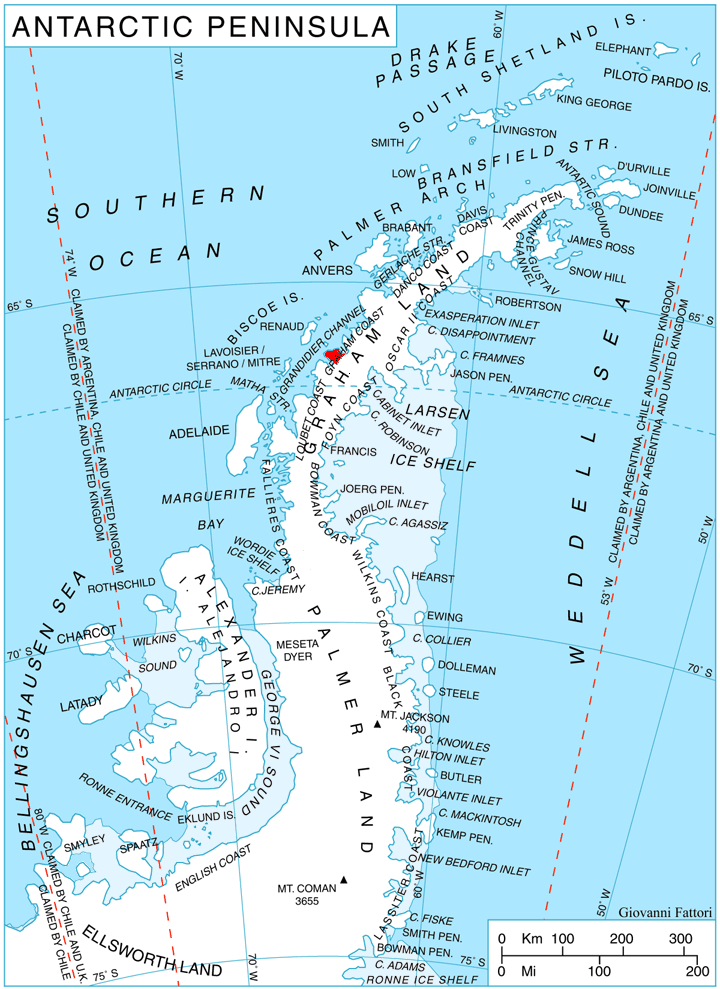
Location of Velingrad Peninsula on Graham Land, Antarctic Peninsula.

Veshka Point (Bulgarian: нос Вешка, ‘Nos Vishka’ \'nos 'vish-ka\) is the point projecting 1.4 km into Dimitrov Cove on the north coast of Velingrad Peninsula, Graham Coast in Graham Land, Antarctica, and separating the glacier termini of Hoek Glacier to the southwest and Rusalka Glacier to the northeast. It is named after Veshka Peak in the Rhodope Mountains, Bulgaria.

== Location ==
Veshka Point is located at 65°57′59″S 65°03′57″W, which is 4.14 km east-southeast of Pripek Point, 1.7 km south of Camacúa Island and 4 km southwest of Biser Point. British mapping in 1971.

== Maps ==
- Antarctic Digital Database (ADD). Scale 1:250000 topographic map of Antarctica. Scientific Committee on Antarctic Research (SCAR). Since 1993, regularly upgraded and updated.
- British Antarctic Territory. Scale 1:200000 topographic map. DOS 610 Series, Sheet W 65 64. Directorate of Overseas Surveys, Tolworth, UK, 1971.
