= Mirovyane Peak =

Mountain in Ellsworth Land, Antarctica

Location of Sentinel Range in Western Antarctica.

Sentinel Range map.

Mirovyane Peak (Bulgarian: връх Мировяне, romanized: vrah Mirovyane, IPA: [ˈvrɤx miˈrɔvʲɐnɛ]) is a mountain rising to 1387 m in Maglenik Heights, north-central Sentinel Range in the Ellsworth Mountains of Antarctica. It is surmounting Kopsis Glacier to the west, lower Embree Glacier to the north, and Young Glacier to the south.

The peak is named after the settlement of Mirovyane in Western Bulgaria.

== Location ==
Mirovyane Peak is located at 78°04′30″S 85°04′54″W, which is 3.46 km northeast of Zimornitsa Peak, 13.68 km southeast of Mount Schmid and 17.94 km north-northwest of Mount Besch. US mapping in 1961, updated in 1988.

== See also ==
- Mountains in Antarctica

== Maps ==
- Vinson Massif. Scale 1:250 000 topographic map. Reston, Virginia: US Geological Survey, 1988.
- Antarctic Digital Database (ADD). Scale 1:250000 topographic map of Antarctica. Scientific Committee on Antarctic Research (SCAR). Since 1993, regularly updated.
