= Pripek =

Pripek may refer to:

- Pripek, Burgas Province, Bulgaria
- Pripek, Kardzhali Province, Bulgaria
- Pripek, Varna Province, Bulgaria
- Pripek Point, Graham Land, Antarctica
