= Dropla Gap =

Location of Sentinel Range in Western Antarctica.

Sentinel Range map.

Dropla Gap (Bulgarian: седловина Дропла, ‘Sedlovina Dropla’ \ se-dlo-vi-'na dro-'pla\) is the flat, ice-covered saddle of elevation 1073 m in north-central Sentinel Range in Ellsworth Mountains, Antarctica, extending 1.35 km to link Maglenik Heights to the west and Barnes Ridge to the east. It is part of the glacial divide between Young Glacier to the north and Arapya Glacier to the south.

The gap is named after the settlements of Dropla in Northeastern and Southeastern Bulgaria.

== Location ==
Dropla Gap is centred at 78°08′15″S 84°58′20″W. US mapping in 1961, updated in 1988.

== Maps ==
- Vinson Massif. Scale 1:250 000 topographic map. Reston, Virginia: US Geological Survey, 1988.
- Antarctic Digital Database (ADD). Scale 1:250000 topographic map of Antarctica. Scientific Committee on Antarctic Research (SCAR). Since 1993, regularly updated.
