= Oreshak Peak =

Mountain in Ellsworth Land, Antarctica

Location of Sentinel Range in Western Antarctica.

Sentinel Range map.

Oreshak Peak (Bulgarian: връх Орешак, romanized: vrah Oreshak, IPA: [ˈvrɤx orɛˈʃak]) is the peak rising to 2829 m in the Bangey Heights of north-central Sentinel Range in Ellsworth Mountains, Antarctica. It is surmounting Patleyna Glacier to the south-southwest, Embree Glacier to the west and north, and Marsa Glacier to the east.

The peak is named after the settlements of Oreshak in Northern and Northeastern Bulgaria.

== Location ==
Oreshak Peak is located at 78°02′24″S 85°44′06″W, which is 1.75 km north-northwest of Golemani Peak, 6.86 km north-northeast of Mount Todd, 6.36 km east-southeast of Mount Goldthwait, 4.43 km southwest of Mount Schmid and 2.66 km west of Fucha Peak. US mapping in 1961, updated in 1988.

== See also ==
- Mountains in Antarctica

== Maps ==
- Vinson Massif. Scale 1:250 000 topographic map. Reston, Virginia: US Geological Survey, 1988.
- Antarctic Digital Database (ADD). Scale 1:250000 topographic map of Antarctica. Scientific Committee on Antarctic Research (SCAR). Since 1993, regularly updated.
