= Razboyna =

Razboyna (also written Razboina, Razboïna; or Разбойна in Cyrillic) may refer to:

- In Bulgaria:
  - Razboyna, Burgas Province - a village in Ruen municipality, Burgas Province
  - Razboyna, Targovishte Province - a village in Targovishte municipality, Targovishte Province
