= Voysil Peak =

Mountain in Antarctica

Location of Sentinel Range in Western Antarctica.

Sentinel Range map.

Voysil Peak (Bulgarian: връх Войсил, romanized: vrah Voysil, IPA: [ˈvrɤɣ vojˈsiɫ]) is the peak rising to 2743 m in Maglenik Heights, north-central Sentinel Range in Ellsworth Mountains, Antarctica. It is surmounting Kopsis Glacier tributaries to the north and east, and upper Ellen Glacier to the southwest.

The peak is named after the settlement of Voysil in Southern Bulgaria.

== Location ==
Voysil Peak is located at 78°07′39″S 85°35′39″W, which is 7.1 km east of Mount Press, 5.6 km south-southeast of Bezden Peak, 9.76 km west-southwest of Zimornitsa Peak and 4.07 km northwest of Mount Gozur. US mapping in 1961, updated in 1988.

== Maps ==
- Vinson Massif. Scale 1:250 000 topographic map. Reston, Virginia: US Geological Survey, 1988.
- Antarctic Digital Database (ADD). Scale 1:250000 topographic map of Antarctica. Scientific Committee on Antarctic Research (SCAR). Since 1993, regularly updated.
