= Barnes Ridge =

Barnes Ridge may refer to:

- Barnes Ridge (Antarctica)
- Barnes Ridge (Missouri)
