= Dropla =

Dropla may refer to:

- Dropla, Burgas Province, village in Bulgaria
- Dropla, Dobrich Province, village in Bulgaria
- Dropla Gap, flat, ice-covered saddle in Ellsworth Mountains, Antarctica
- "Dropla", a song by Youth Lagoon from the album Wondrous Bughouse
