= Chepino (disambiguation) =

Chepino can refer to several places in Bulgaria:

- the Chepino Valley in the Rhodopes
- Chepino, a neighbourhood of Velingrad
- Chepino, a village in Pernik Province
- Chepino Saddle in Antarctica
