= Padala Glacier =

Glacier in Antarctica

- Location of Sentinel Range in Western Antarctica

- Location within Antarctica
- Type: tributary
- Location: Ellsworth Land
- Coordinates: 78°02′40″S 85°31′00″W
- Length: 5.6 nautical miles (10.4 km; 6.4 mi)
- Width: 2.4 nautical miles (4.4 km; 2.8 mi)
- Thickness: unknown
- Terminus: Embree Glacier
- Status: unknown

Map of Sentinel Range.

Padala Glacier (Bulgarian: ледник Падала, romanized: lednik Padala, IPA: [ˈlɛdnik pɐˈdaɫɐ]) is the 5.6 nautical miles (10.4 km; 6.4 mi) long and 2.4 nautical miles (4.4 km; 2.8 mi) wide glacier in Bangey Heights on the east side of the main ridge of north-central Sentinel Range in Ellsworth Mountains, Antarctica. It is situated northwest of Kopsis Glacier and east-southeast of Marsa Glacier. The glacier drains the northeast slopes of Bezden Peak and the southeast slopes of Golemani Peak, flows northeastwards and joins Embree Glacier northwest of Mount Hleven.

The glacier is named after the settlement of Padala in Western Bulgaria.

== Location ==
Padala Glacier is centred at 78°02′40″S 85°31′00″W. US mapping in 1961 and 1988.

== See also ==
- List of glaciers in the Antarctic
- Glaciology

== Maps ==
- Vinson Massif. Scale 1:250 000 topographic map. Reston, Virginia: US Geological Survey, 1988.
- Antarctic Digital Database (ADD). Scale 1:250000 topographic map of Antarctica. Scientific Committee on Antarctic Research (SCAR). Since 1993, regularly updated.
