= Biser Point =

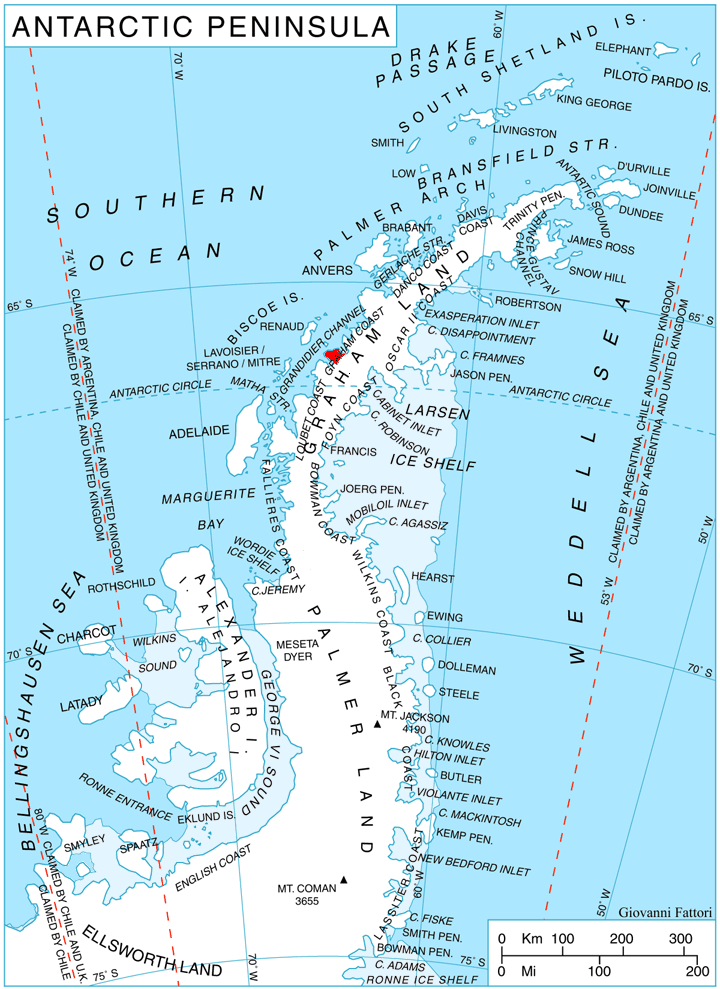
Location of Velingrad Peninsula on Graham Coast, Antarctic Peninsula.

Biser Point (Bulgarian: нос Бисер, ‘Nos Biser’ \'nos 'bi-ser\) is the narrow rocky point next north of the terminus of Rusalka Glacier and forming the east side of the entrance to Dimitrov Cove on the northwest coast of Velingrad Peninsula on Graham Coast in Graham Land, Antarctica.

The point is named after the settlement of Biser in Southern Bulgaria.

== Location ==
Biser Point is located at 65°56′17″S 65°00′38″W, which is 3.91 km west-southwest of Loqui Point, 7.7 km northwest of Mount Paulcke and 6.8 km east-northeast of Pripek Point.

== Maps ==
- British Antarctic Territory. Scale 1:200000 topographic map. DOS 610 Series, Sheet W 65 64. Directorate of Overseas Surveys, Tolworth, UK, 1971.
- Antarctic Digital Database (ADD). Scale 1:250000 topographic map of Antarctica. Scientific Committee on Antarctic Research (SCAR). Since 1993, regularly upgraded and updated.
