= Marsa Glacier =

Glacier in Antarctica

- Location of Sentinel Range in Western Antarctica

- Location within Antarctica
- Type: tributary
- Location: Ellsworth Land
- Coordinates: 78°01′50″S 85°41′40″W
- Length: 2.7 nautical miles (5.0 km; 3.1 mi)
- Width: 0.8 nautical miles (1.5 km; 0.92 mi)
- Thickness: unknown
- Terminus: Embree Glacier
- Status: unknown

Map of Sentinel Range.

Marsa Glacier (Bulgarian: ледник Марса, romanized: lednik Marsa, IPA: [ˈlɛdnik ˈmarsɐ]) is the 5 km long and 1.5 km wide glacier in Bangey Heights on the east side of the main ridge of north-central Sentinel Range in Ellsworth Mountains, Antarctica. It is situated northeast of Patleyna Glacier and northwest of the head of Padala Glacier. The glacier drains the north slopes of Golemani Peak, flows north-northwestwards between Oreshak Peak and Fucha Peak, and joins Embree Glacier west of Mount Schmid.

The glacier is named after the medieval settlement of Marsa in Southern Bulgaria.

== Location ==
Marsa Glacier is centred at 78°01′50″S 85°41′40″W. US mapping in 1961 and 1988.

== See also ==
- List of glaciers in the Antarctic
- Glaciology

== Maps ==
- Vinson Massif. Scale 1:250 000 topographic map. Reston, Virginia: US Geological Survey, 1988.
- Antarctic Digital Database (ADD). Scale 1:250000 topographic map of Antarctica. Scientific Committee on Antarctic Research (SCAR). Since 1993, regularly updated.
