= Mount Tegge =

Mountain in Ellsworth Land, Antarctica

Coordinates: 77°57′S 85°15′W

Location of Sentinel Range in Western Antarctica.

Northern Sentinel Range map.

Mount Tegge is an isolated mountain mass (1,570 m) located at the mouth of Embree Glacier, on the east side of the Sentinel Range in the Ellsworth Mountains. It is located 6.37 km northeast of Mount Hleven in Bangey Heights and 6.65 km east-southeast of Mount McKeown in Sostra Heights.

The mountain was first mapped by the United States Geological Survey (USGS) from surveys and U.S. Navy air photos from 1957 to 1959. It was named by the Advisory Committee on Antarctic Names (US-ACAN) for 1st Lieutenant Richard C. Tegge of the United States Air Force (USAF), who participated in establishing the South Pole Station in the 1956–57 season.
