= Snyagovo =

Snyagovo may refer to the following places in Bulgaria:

- Snyagovo, Burgas Province
- Snyagovo, Dobrich Province
