= Maglenik Heights =

Location of Sentinel Range in Western Antarctica.

Sentinel Range map.

Maglenik Heights (Bulgarian: Мъгленишки възвишения, ‘Maglenishki Vazvisheniya’ \'m&-gle-nish-ki v&-zvi-'she-ni-ya\) are the heights rising to 2752 m at Mount Gozur and including also Roberts Peak, Chapman Peak, Ichera Peak, Voysil Peak, Zimornitsa Peak and Mirovyane Peak in north-central Sentinel Range in Ellsworth Mountains, Antarctica, extending 26 km in north–south direction and 20 km in east–west direction. They are bounded by Ellen Glacier to the south and west, Embree Glacier and Kopsis Glacier to the north, and Rutford Ice Stream and Arapya Glacier to the east, and linked to Bangey Heights to the northwest by Panicheri Gap, and to Barnes Ridge to the east by Dropla Gap.

The heights are named after Maglenik Ridge in Southern Bulgaria.

== Location ==
Maglenik Heights are centred at 78°10′00″S 85°14′00″W. US mapping in 1961, updated in 1988.

== Maps ==
- Vinson Massif. Scale 1:250 000 topographic map. Reston, Virginia: US Geological Survey, 1988.
- Antarctic Digital Database (ADD). Scale 1:250000 topographic map of Antarctica. Scientific Committee on Antarctic Research (SCAR). Since 1993, regularly updated.

== See also ==
- Mountains in Antarctica

Geographical features include:

- Arapya Glacier
- Barnes Ridge
- Chapman Peak
- Dropla Gap
- Ellen Glacier
- Embree Glacier
- Ichera Peak
- Kopsis Glacier
- Mirovyane Peak
- Mount Gozur
- Panicheri Gap
- Roberts Peak
- Voysil Peak
- Young Glacier
- Zimornitsa Peak
- Rutford Ice Stream
