= Panicheri Gap =

Geological feature

Location of Sentinel Range in Western Antarctica.

Sentinel Range map.

Panicheri Gap (Bulgarian: Паничерска седловина, ‘Panicherska Sedlovina’ \pa-ni-'cher-ska se-dlo-vi-'na\) is the flat, ice-covered saddle of elevation 2109 m in north-central Sentinel Range in Ellsworth Mountains, Antarctica, linking Bangey Heights to the north to Maglenik Heights to the south. It is part of the glacial divide between Kopsis Glacier to the east and Ellen Glacier to the west.

The gap is named after the settlement of Panicheri in Southern Bulgaria.

== Location ==
Panicheri Gap is centred at 78°07′02.1″S 85°40′38.7″W. US mapping in 1961, updated in 1988.

== Maps ==
- Vinson Massif. Scale 1:250 000 topographic map. Reston, Virginia: US Geological Survey, 1988.
- Antarctic Digital Database (ADD). Scale 1:250000 topographic map of Antarctica. Scientific Committee on Antarctic Research (SCAR). Since 1993, regularly updated.a: US Geological Survey, 1988.
