= Topchiysko =

- Village
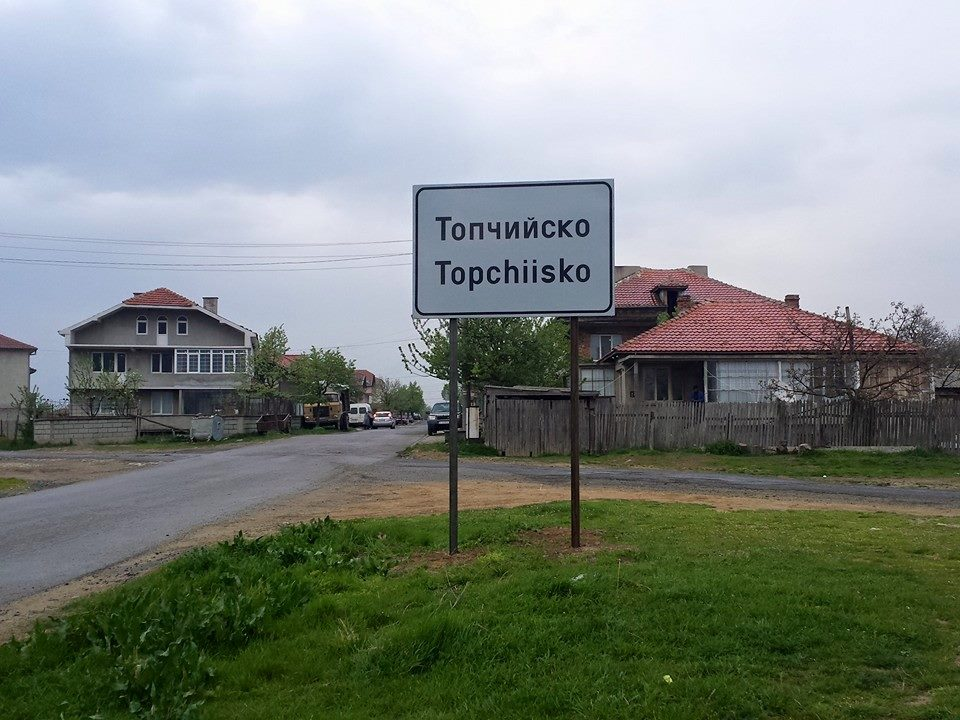
- The entrance of Topchiysko village.

- Location within Bulgaria
- Coordinates: 42°51′N 27°20′E
- Country: Bulgaria
- Province: Burgas Province
- Municipality: Ruen Municipality
- Time zone: UTC+2 (EET)
  - Summer (DST): UTC+3 (EEST)

Topchiysko (Turkish: Topçuköy [toptʃukøj]), is a village in Ruen Municipality, in Burgas Province, in southeastern Bulgaria.
