= Rusalka Glacier =

Glacier in Antarctica

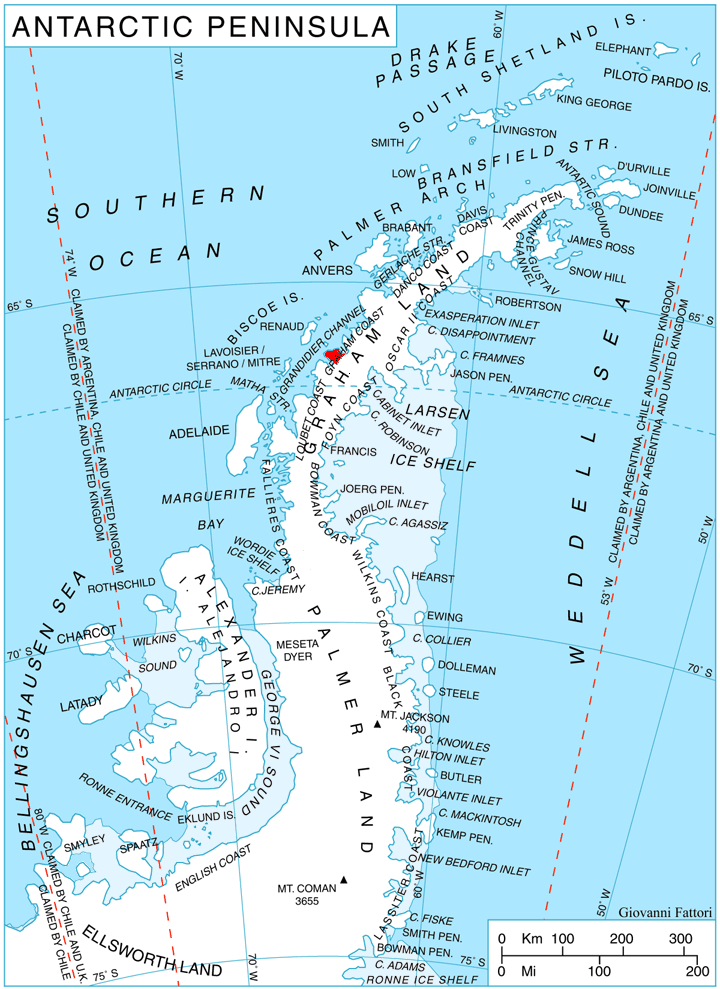
Location of Velingrad Peninsula on Graham Coast, Antarctic Peninsula.

Rusalka Glacier (Bulgarian: ледник Русалка, romanized: lednik Rusalka, IPA: [ˈlɛdnik roˈsaɫkɐ]) is the 8 km long and 4.6 km wide glacier on Velingrad Peninsula, Graham Coast on the west side of Antarctic Peninsula, situated northeast of Hoek Glacier. It drains the west slopes of Mount Paulcke, and flows northwestwards into Dimitrov Cove in Harrison Passage.

The glacier is named after the Bulgarian Black Sea resort of Rusalka.

== Location ==
Rusalka Glacier is centred at 65°58′30″S 64°57′20″W. British mapping in 1971.

== Maps ==
- British Antarctic Territory. Scale 1:200000 topographic map. DOS 610 Series, Sheet W 65 64. Directorate of Overseas Surveys, Tolworth, UK, 1971.
- Antarctic Digital Database (ADD). Scale 1:250000 topographic map of Antarctica. Scientific Committee on Antarctic Research (SCAR). Since 1993, regularly upgraded and updated.
