= Zaychar =

Zaychar Turkish: Göcenler
- Village
- Flag

- Location within Bulgaria
- Coordinates: 42°47′N 27°10′E
- Country: Bulgaria
- Province: Burgas Province
- Municipality: Ruen Municipality

Area
  - Village: 22.975 km^{2} (8.871 sq mi)
- Elevation: 414 m (1,358 ft)
- Highest elevation: 430 m (1,411 ft)

Population (2026)
  - Village: 1,010 inhabitants
  - Metro: Approximately 1,150 inhabitants in the village and its surrounding
- Time zone: UTC+2 (EET)
  - Summer (DST): UTC+3 (EEST)

Zaychar (Bulgarian: Зайчар [zɐjˈt͡ʃar]) is a village in Ruen Municipality, in Burgas Province, in southeastern Bulgaria.

Zaychar, also known as Göcenler by its Turkish name is a village located in the Ruen Municipality, in Burgas Province, in southeastern Bulgaria. The village dates its origin to the Turkish settlement during the Ottoman Empire's expansion into the Balkans. The villages name of origin comes from the Turkish word of "Göç", to migrate, referring to the migration of Oghuz Turks into the region during Ottoman expansion.

Under the Ottoman Empire, the settlement developed as an ethnic Turkish village known as Gyudzhenler (Göcenler in modern Turkish, historically recorded in various transliterations such as Gŭodzhenler). Following the Russo-Turkish War (1877–1878) and the Treaty of Berlin, the village fell within the borders of the autonomous Ottoman province of Eastern Rumelia. Following the bloodless unification of Eastern Rumelia with the Principality of Bulgaria in 1885, Gyudzhenler became part of the modern Bulgarian state. Nearly five decades later, on December 7, 1934 (Ministerial Order No. 3775), the Bulgarian government renamed the village Zaychar (derived from the Bulgarian word for hare, zaek) as part of a nationwide campaign to replace Turkish toponyms with Slavic names.

Census records show that Zaychar had 798 residents in 1934, holding steady around that level until the mid-1950s. Beginning in the 1960s, the village experienced steady demographic expansion, reaching a historical peak of 1,182 inhabitants in 1985 before stabilizing at roughly 1,110 to 1,140 residents in recent decades.

Today, Zaychar remains a predominantly Bulgarian Turkish village. Its civic life centers around a functioning mosque, the Nikola Yonkov Vaptsarov municipal primary school, a post office, and the local Far – 1952 chitalishte (traditional community cultural center), which has served the village since 1952.

Zaychar Glacier on Graham Land in Antarctica is named after the settlement.
