= Ranuli Ice Piedmont =

Glacier in Antarctica

- Location of Sentinel Range in Western Antarctica

- Location within Antarctica
- Type: tributary
- Location: Ellsworth Land
- Coordinates: 78°09′50″S 84°40′00″W
- Length: 7 nautical miles (13 km; 8.1 mi)
- Width: 3 nautical miles (5.6 km; 3.5 mi)
- Thickness: unknown
- Terminus: Rutford Ice Stream to the east-northeast Young Glacier to the north Ellen Glacier to the south.
- Status: unknown

Sentinel Range map

Ranuli Ice Piedmont (Bulgarian: ледник Ранули, romanized: lednik Ranuli, IPA: [ˈlɛdnik rɐˈnuli]) is the glacier extending 7 nautical miles (13 km; 8.1 mi) in south-southeast to north-northwest direction and 3 nautical miles (5.6 km; 3.5 mi) in west-southwest to east-northeast direction on the east side of Sentinel Range in Ellsworth Mountains, Antarctica. It is draining the east slopes of Barnes Ridge to flow into Rutford Ice Stream to the east-northeast, Young Glacier to the north, and Ellen Glacier to the south.

The feature is named after the ancient town of Ranuli in southeastern Bulgaria.

== Location ==
Ranuli Ice Piedmont is located at 78°09′50″S 84°40′00″W. US mapping in 1988.

== See also ==
- List of glaciers in the Antarctic
- Glaciology

== Maps ==
- Vinson Massif. Scale 1:250 000 topographic map. Reston, Virginia: US Geological Survey, 1988.
- Antarctic Digital Database (ADD). Scale 1:250000 topographic map of Antarctica. Scientific Committee on Antarctic Research (SCAR). Since 1993, regularly updated.
