= Sredna Mahala =

- Village
- Location in Bulgaria
- Coordinates: 42°50′35″N 27°19′40″E
- Country: Bulgaria
- Province: Burgas Province
- Municipality: Ruen Municipality
- Time zone: UTC+2 (EET)
  - Summer (DST): UTC+3 (EEST)

Sredna Mahala (Turkish: Orta Mahalle) is a village in Ruen Municipality, in Burgas Province, in southeastern Bulgaria. The villagers are mostly Bulgarian Turks with Turkish descent.
