= Shivarovo =

- Village
- Location within Bulgaria
- Coordinates: 42°50′N 27°10′E
- Country: Bulgaria
- Province: Burgas Province
- Municipality: Ruen Municipality
- Time zone: UTC+2 (EET)
  - Summer (DST): UTC+3 (EEST)

Shivarovo is a village in Ruen Municipality, in Burgas Province, in southeastern Bulgaria. It is located at 42.833N and 27.167E with an area of 17.514 km^{2}.
