= Listets, Burgas Province =

Listets Листец
- Village
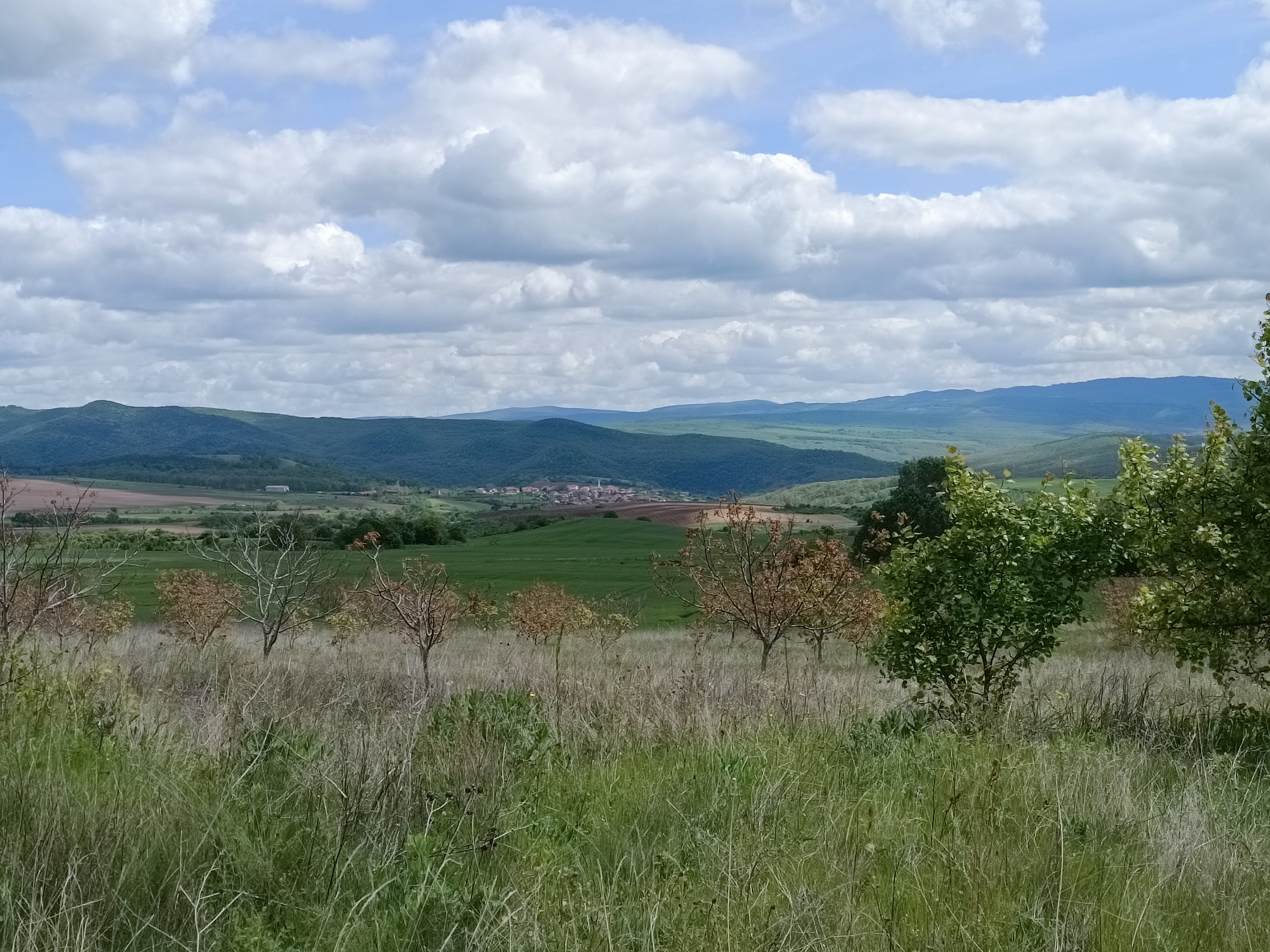
- Interactive map of Listets
- Country: Bulgaria
- Province: Burgas Province
- Municipality: Ruen Municipality
- Time zone: UTC+2 (EET)
  - Summer (DST): UTC+3 (EEST)

Listets is a village in Ruen Municipality, in Burgas Province, in southeastern Bulgaria.
