= Dimitrov Cove =

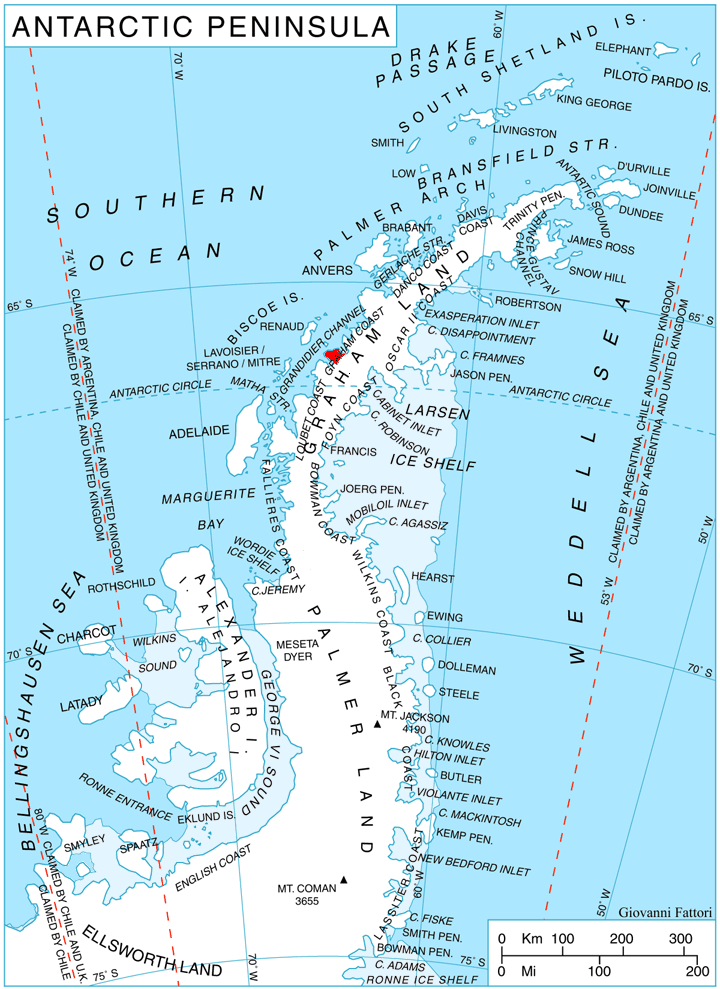
Location of Velingrad Peninsula on Graham Coast, Antarctic Peninsula.

Dimitrov Cove (Bulgarian: Димитров залив, romanized: Dimitrov zaliv, IPA: [dimiˈtrɔv ˈzalif]) is the 6.8 km wide cove indenting for 4.8 km the northwest coast of Velingrad Peninsula on Graham Coast in Graham Land, Antarctica, which is entered between Pripek Point to the west and Biser Point to the east. Hoek Glacier and Rusalka Glacier flow into the cove, their termini separated by Veshka Point, while Camacúa Island is lying at the cove's entrance.

The cove is named after the Bulgarian historian Bozhidar Dimitrov for his support for the Bulgarian Antarctic programme.

== Location ==
Dimitrov Cove is centred at 65°57′50″S 65°04′30″W. British mapping in 1971.

== Maps ==
- British Antarctic Territory. Scale 1:200000 topographic map. DOS 610 Series, Sheet W 65 64. Directorate of Overseas Surveys, Tolworth, UK, 1971.
- Antarctic Digital Database (ADD). Scale 1:250000 topographic map of Antarctica. Scientific Committee on Antarctic Research (SCAR), 1993–2016.
