= Rossa Point =

Headland in Antarctica

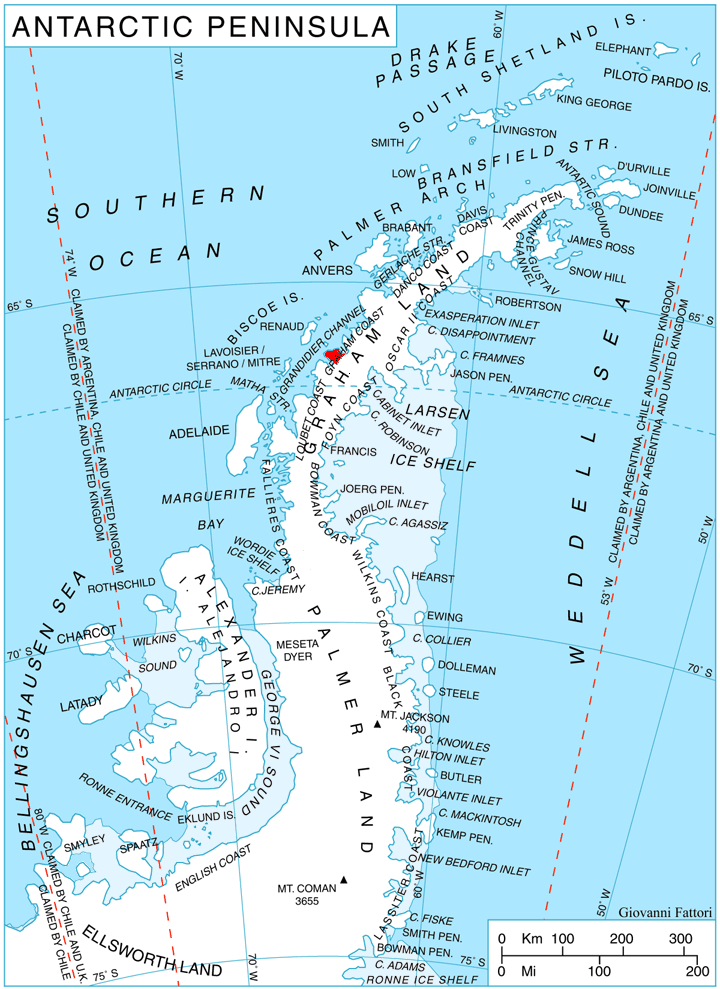
Location of Velingrad Peninsula on Graham Coast, Antarctic Peninsula.

Rossa Point (65°57′S 65°14′W) is a point 2 nautical miles (3.7 km) northeast of Ferin Head on Velingrad Peninsula, the west coast of Graham Land, Antarctica. Charted by the British Graham Land Expedition (BGLE) under Rymill, 1934–37. Named by the United Kingdom Antarctic Place-Names Committee (UK-APC) in 1959 for Anders Rossa, a Jokkmokk Sami who, with Pava Tuorda, accompanied A.E. Nordenskjold to Greenland in 1883 and first demonstrated the possibilities of skis for polar travel.

== Maps ==
- British Antarctic Territory. Scale 1:200000 topographic map. DOS 610 Series, Sheet W 65 64. Directorate of Overseas Surveys, Tolworth, UK, 1971.
