= Bilka, Bulgaria =

Coordinates: 42.933°N 27.233°E

Bilka
- Village
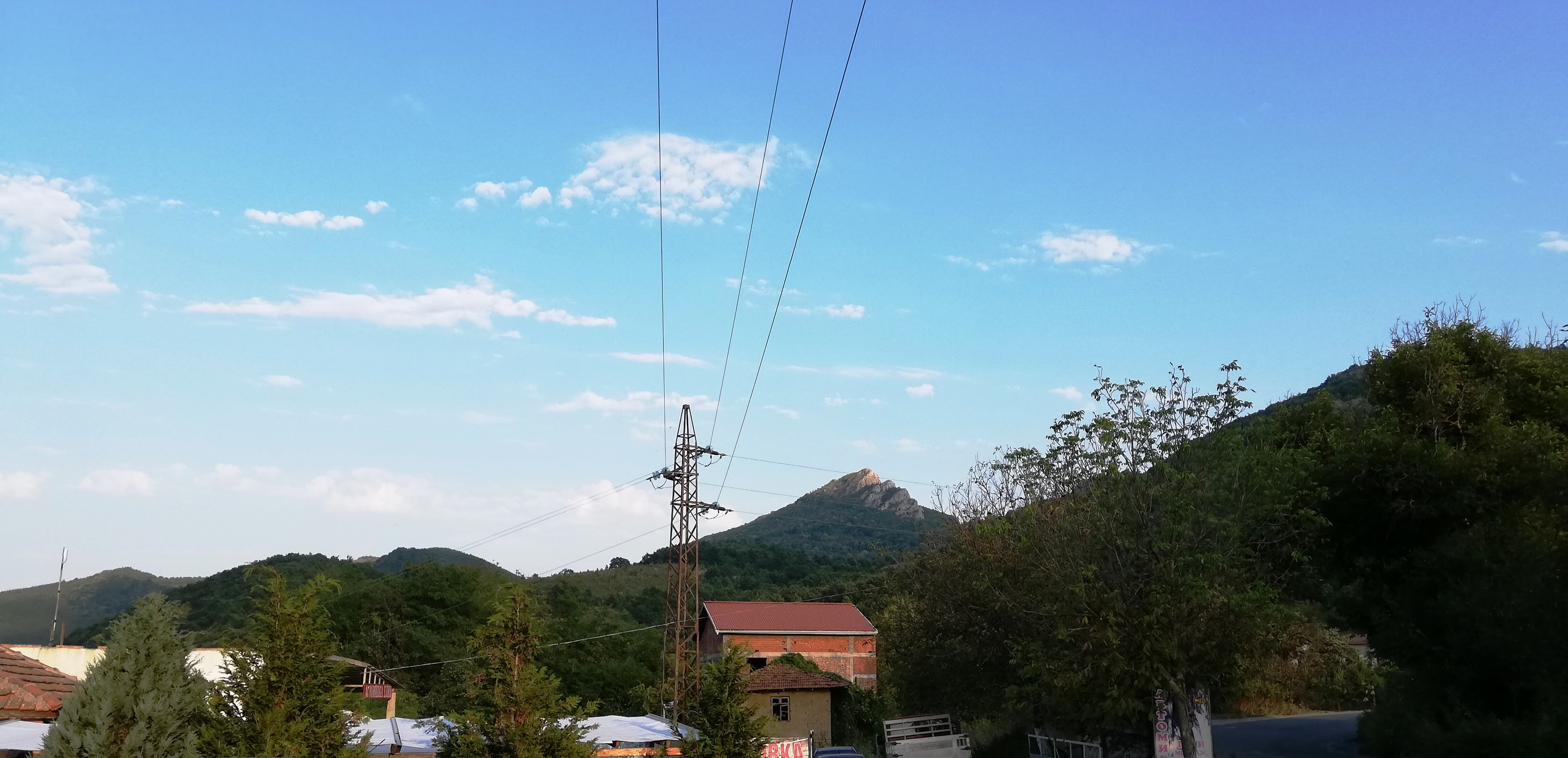
- Interactive map of Bilka
- Country: Bulgaria
- Province: Burgas Province
- Municipality: Ruen Municipality

Population (2011)
  - Total: 602
- Time zone: UTC+2 (EET)
  - Summer (DST): UTC+3 (EEST)

Bilka is a village in Ruen Municipality, in Burgas Province, in southeastern Bulgaria.

== Demography ==
The village of Bilka has 602 inhabitants as of 2011. Nearly all inhabitants are ethnic Turks (99%).

Ethnic groups in the village of Bilka (2011 census)
Ethnic group	Percentage
Bulgarians	0.7%
Turks	99.1%
Romani	0.0%
others and indefinable	0.0%
