= Zimornitsa Peak =

Mountain in Antarctica

Location of Sentinel Range in Western Antarctica.

Sentinel Range map.

Zimornitsa Peak (Bulgarian: връх Зиморница, romanized: vrah Zimornitsa, IPA: [ˈvrɤɣ ziˈmɔrnit͡sɐ]) is the peak rising to 1600 m in Maglenik Heights, north-central Sentinel Range in Ellsworth Mountains, Antarctica. It is overlooking Kopsis Glacier to the northwest and Young Glacier to the southeast.

The peak is named after the settlement of Zimornitsa in Southern Bulgaria.

== Location ==
Zimornitsa Peak is located at 78°05′35″S 85°12′13″W, which is 7.9 km northeast of Mount Gozur, 11.43 km southeast of Fucha Peak, 3.46 km southwest of Mirovyane Peak and 17.87 km northwest of Mount Besch. US mapping in 1961, updated in 1988.

== Maps ==
- Vinson Massif. Scale 1:250 000 topographic map. Reston, Virginia: US Geological Survey, 1988.
- Antarctic Digital Database (ADD). Scale 1:250000 topographic map of Antarctica. Scientific Committee on Antarctic Research (SCAR). Since 1993, regularly updated.
