= Yabalchevo =

- Village
- Location in Bulgaria
- Coordinates: 42.795°N 27.254°E
- Country: Bulgaria
- Province: Burgas Province
- Municipality: Ruen Municipality
- Time zone: UTC+2 (EET)
  - Summer (DST): UTC+3 (EEST)

Yabalchevo is a village in Ruen Municipality, in Burgas Province, in southeastern Bulgaria.

== Institutions ==
The public institutions in the village are a mayor's office, Elementary school "Dr. Petar Beron", founded in 1903, and a whole-day kindergarten. The majority of the population are Muslims.

== Gallery ==
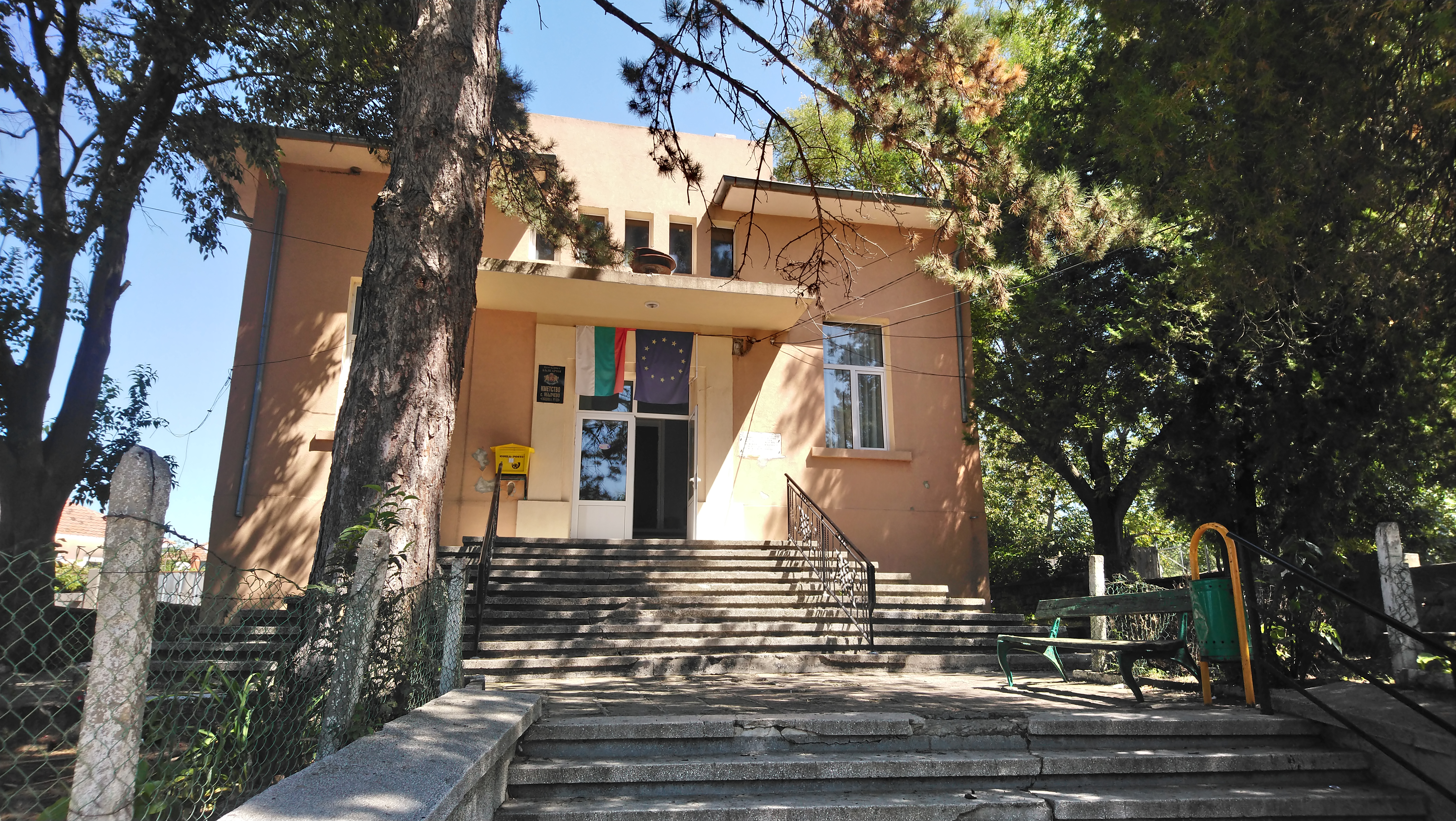
The mayor's office

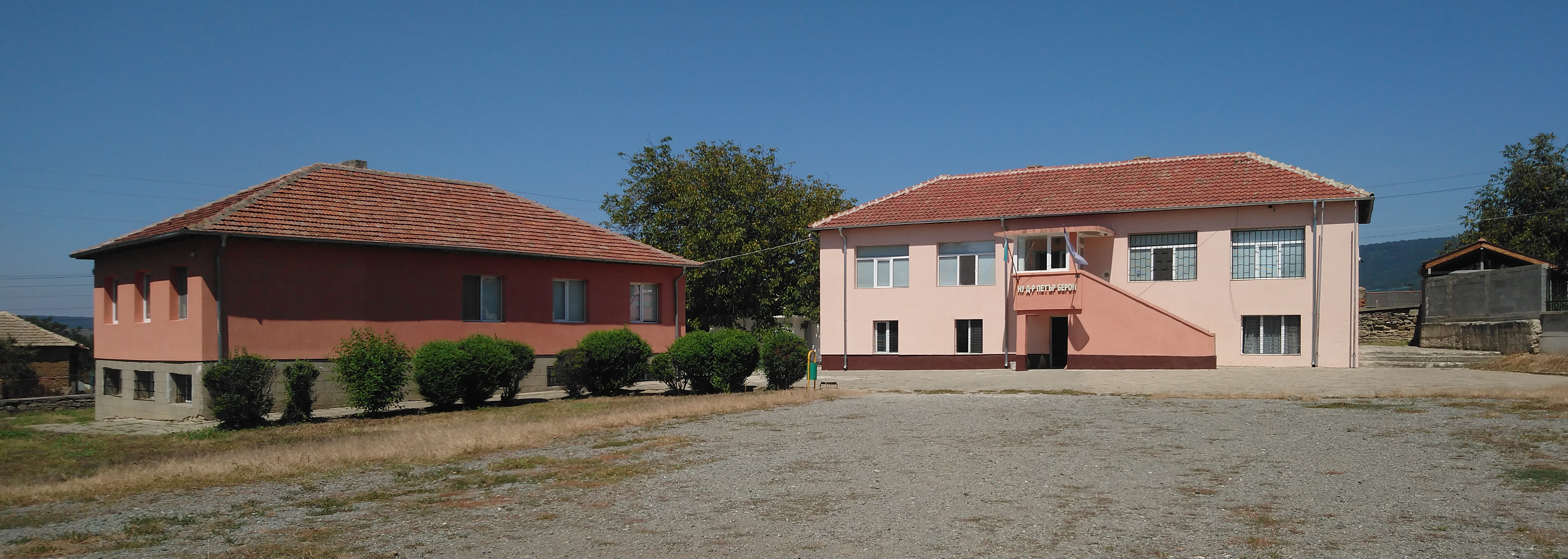
Elementary school "Dr. Petar Beron"

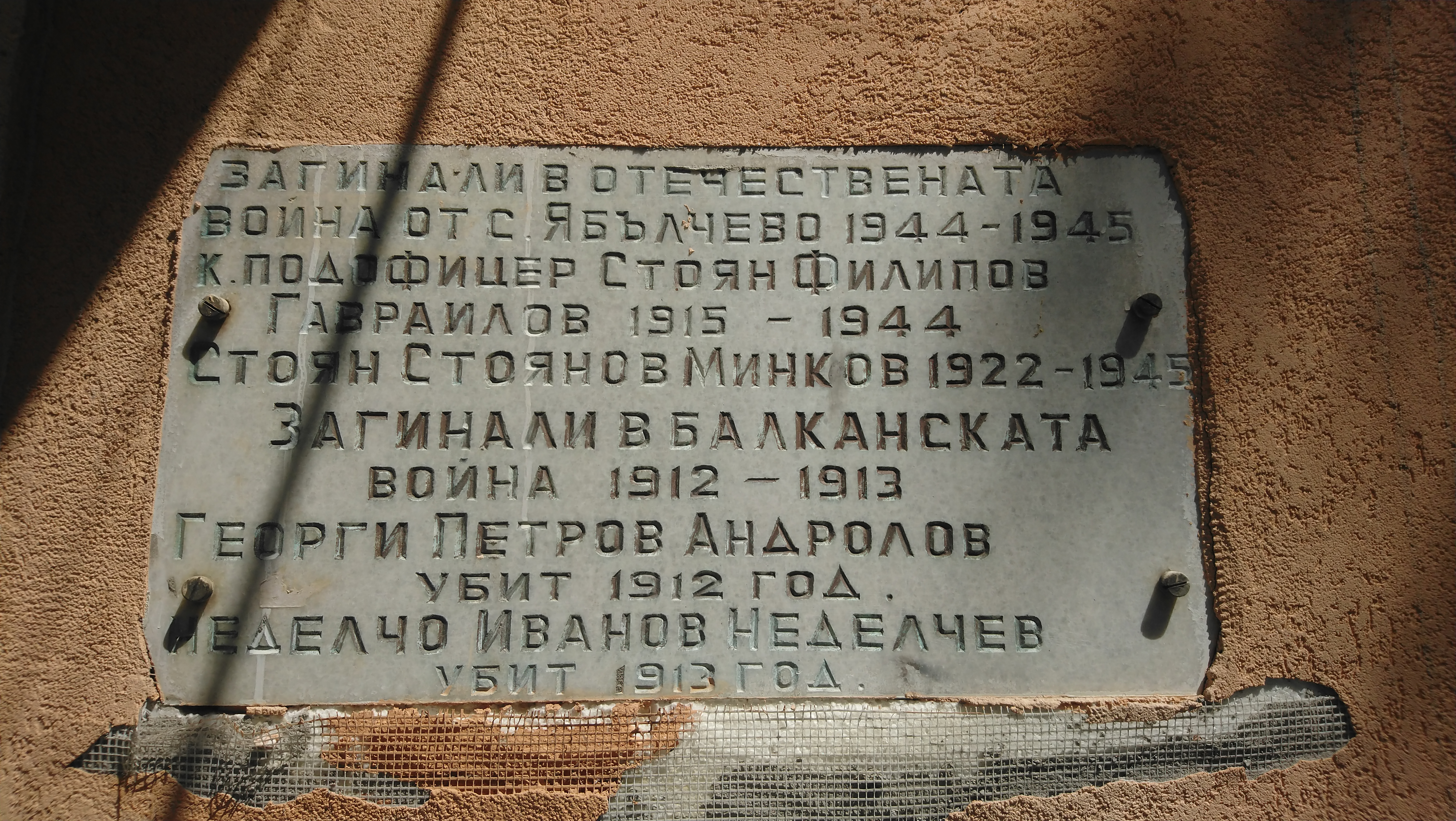
War memorial plaque

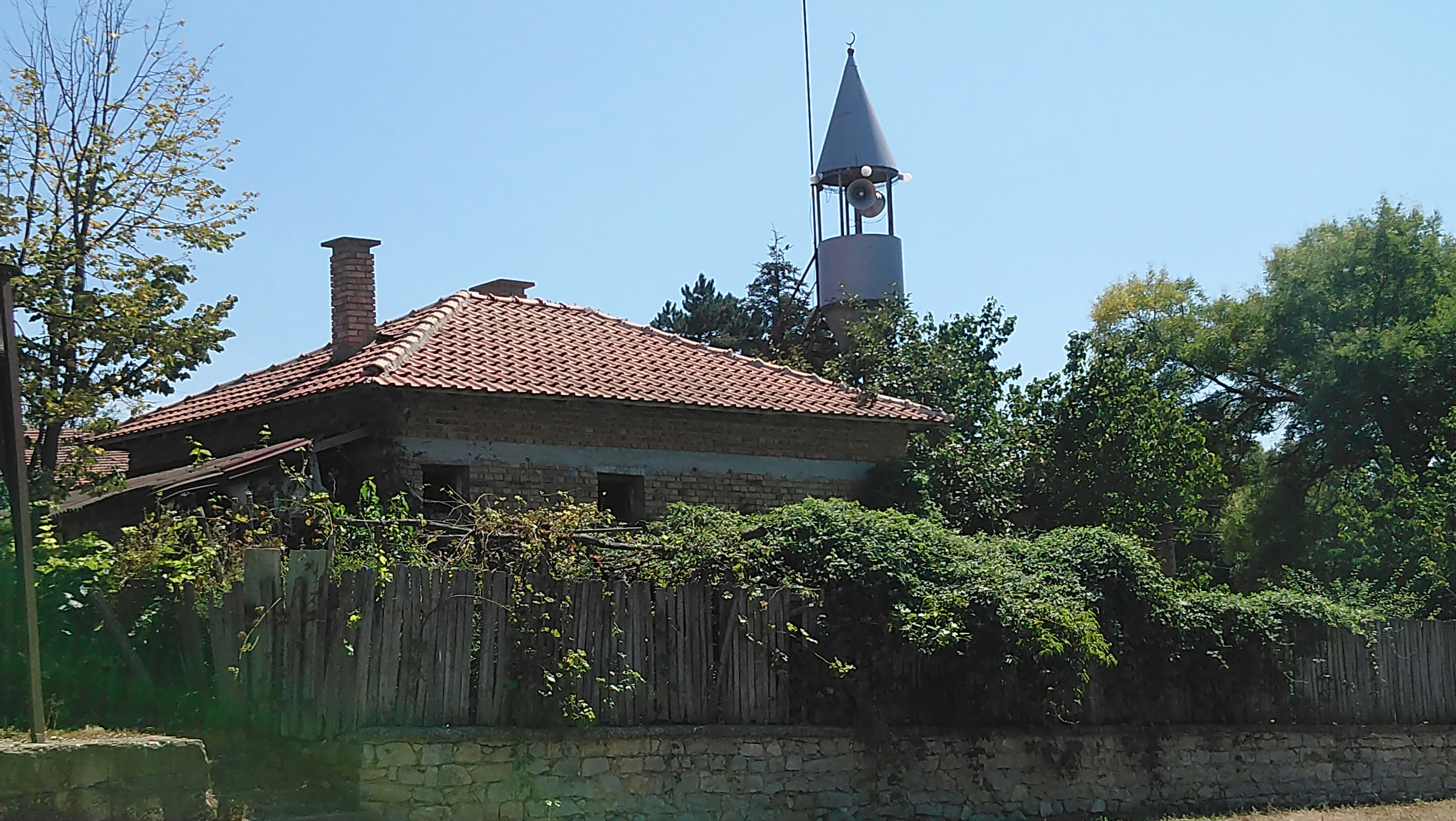
The mosque
