= Skalak, Burgas Province =

Skalak
- Village
- Location in Bulgaria
- Coordinates: 42°48′30″N 27°05′20″E
- Country: Bulgaria
- Province: Burgas Province
- Municipality: Ruen Municipality

Population (2011)
  - Total: ▲620
- Time zone: UTC+2 (EET)
  - Summer (DST): UTC+3 (EEST)

Skalak is a village in Ruen Municipality, in Burgas Province, in southeastern Bulgaria. This village has 620 inhabitants and nearly all of them belong to the Turkish minority of Bulgaria. There are also a few Pomak families living in this villages.
