= Pripek Point =

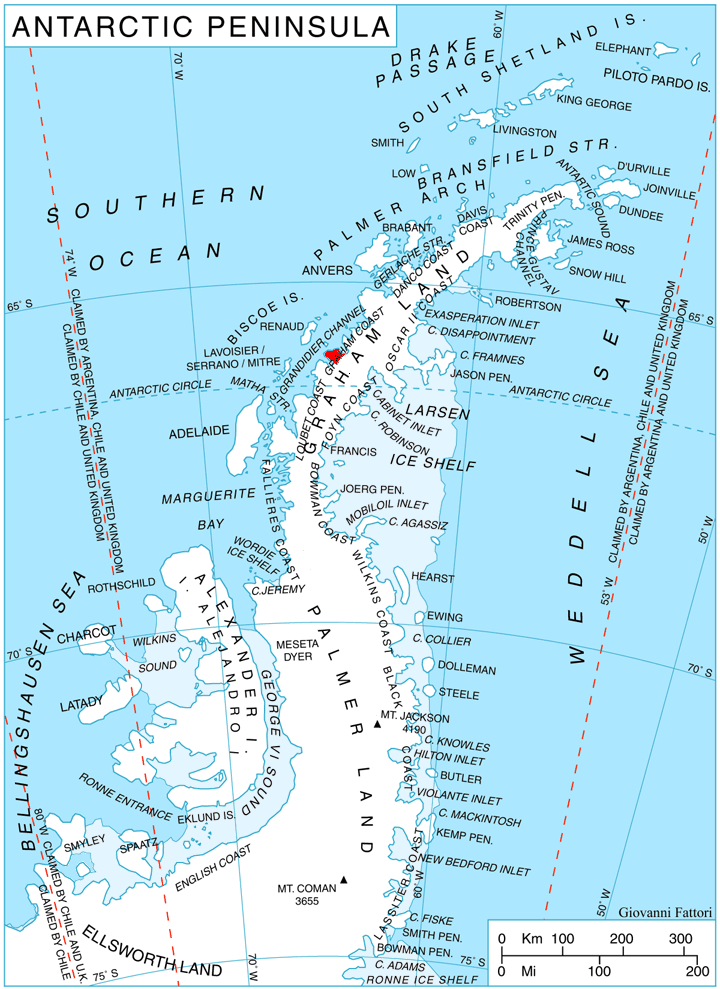
Location of Velingrad Peninsula on Graham Coast, Antarctic Peninsula.

Pripek Point (Bulgarian: нос Припек, ‘Nos Pripek’ \'nos 'pri-pek\) is the point forming the west side of the entrance to Dimitrov Cove on the northwest coast of Velingrad Peninsula on Graham Coast in Graham Land, Antarctica.

The point is named after the settlements of Pripek in Northeastern, Southeastern and Southern Bulgaria, and Dalgi (Long) Pripek in Northern Bulgaria.

== Location ==
Pripek Point is located at 65°57′21″S 65°09′13″W, which is 3.65 km north of Tuorda Peak, 3.55 km east by north of Rossa Point and 6.8 km west-southwest of Biser Point. British mapping in 1971.

== Maps ==
- British Antarctic Territory. Scale 1:200000 topographic map. DOS 610 Series, Sheet W 65 64. Directorate of Overseas Surveys, Tolworth, UK, 1971.
- Antarctic Digital Database (ADD). Scale 1:250000 topographic map of Antarctica. Scientific Committee on Antarctic Research (SCAR). Since 1993, regularly upgraded and updated.
