= Rudina, Burgas Province =

Rudina
- Village
- Location within Bulgaria
- Coordinates: 42°51′N 27°26′E
- Country: Bulgaria
- Province: Burgas Province
- Municipality: Ruen Municipality
- Time zone: UTC+2 (EET)
  - Summer (DST): UTC+3 (EEST)

Rudina is a village in Ruen Municipality, in Burgas Province, in southeastern Bulgaria.
