= Rechitsa, Bulgaria =

Rechitsa
- Village
- Location within Bulgaria
- Coordinates: 42°53′N 27°15′E
- Country: Bulgaria
- Province: Burgas Province
- Municipality: Ruen Municipality
- Time zone: UTC+2 (EET)
  - Summer (DST): UTC+3 (EEST)

Rechitsa is a village in southeastern Bulgaria. The village is located Ruen Municipality, in Burgas Province some 30 kilometers from the Aytos City and 70 kilometers from Burgas and Bulgarian Black Sea Coast and belonging to the administrative boundaries of Burgas Province. As of December 2021, the village has a population of 725 inhabitants.
