= Sokolets =

- Village
- Location in Bulgaria
- Coordinates: 42.941°N 27.180°E
- Country: Bulgaria
- Province: Burgas Province
- Municipality: Ruen Municipality
- Time zone: UTC+2 (EET)
  - Summer (DST): UTC+3 (EEST)

Sokolets is a village in Ruen Municipality, in Burgas Province, in southeastern Bulgaria.
