= Tuorda Peak =

Mountain in Antarctica

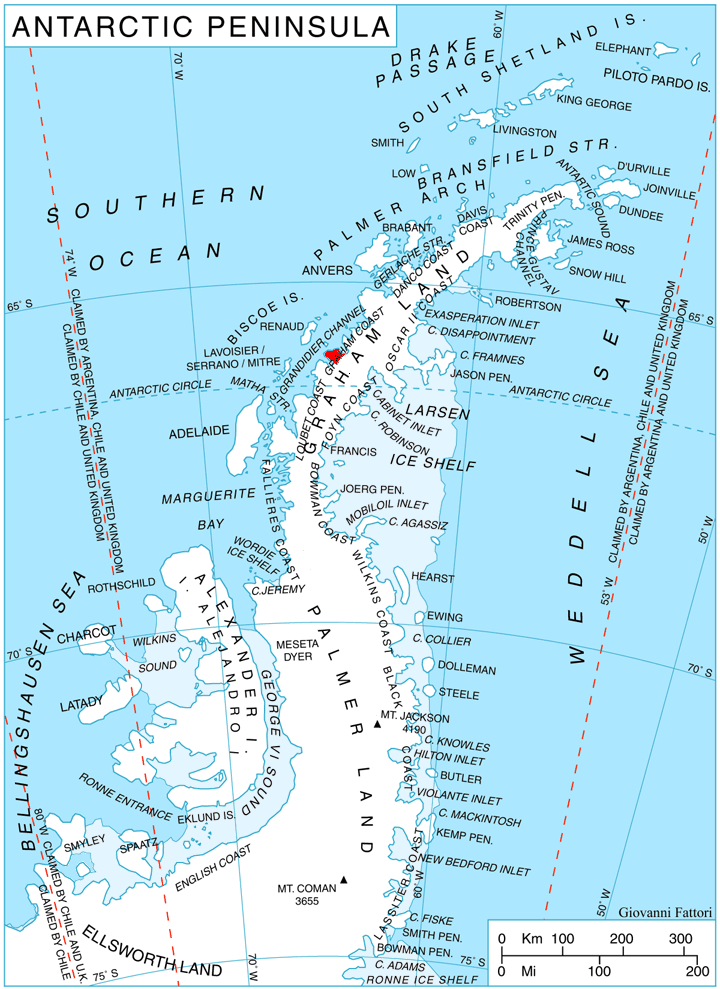
Location of Velingrad Peninsula on Graham Coast, Antarctic Peninsula.

Tuorda Peak (65°59′S 65°10′W) is a peak, 870 m, rising eastward of Ferin Head on Velingrad Peninsula, the west coast of Graham Land, Antarctica. Photographed by Hunting Aerosurveys Ltd. in 1956–57, and mapped from these photos by the Falkland Islands Dependencies Survey (FIDS). Named by the United Kingdom Antarctic Place-Names Committee (UK-APC) in 1959 for Pava L. Tuorda, a Jokkmokk Lapp who, with Anders Rossa, accompanied A.E. Nordenskjold to Greenland in 1883 and first demonstrated the possibilities of skis for polar travel.

== Maps ==
- British Antarctic Territory. Scale 1:200000 topographic map. DOS 610 Series, Sheet W 65 64. Directorate of Overseas Surveys, Tolworth, UK, 1971.
