= Bangey Heights =

Location of Sentinel Range in Western Antarctica.

Sentinel Range map.

The Bangey Heights (Bulgarian: Бангейски възвишения, ‘Bangeyski Vazvisheniya’ \ban-'gey-ski v&-zvi-'she-ni-ya\) are in Antarctica. They are the heights rising to 2997 m near Bezden Peak in north-central Sentinel Range in Ellsworth Mountains, extending 12 km in southwest–northeast direction and 10 km in northwest–southeast direction. They are bounded by Patleyna Glacier to the west, Embree Glacier to the northwest and northeast, and Kopsis Glacier to the southeast, and linked to Probuda Ridge to the southwest by Chepino Saddle, and to Maglenik Heights to the south by Panicheri Gap. Their interior is drained by Marsa Glacier and Padala Glacier.

The heights are named after the settlement of Bangeytsi in northern Bulgaria.

== Location ==
Bangey Heights are centred at 78°02′30″S 85°34′00″W. US mapping in 1961, updated in 1988.

== See also ==
- Mountains in Antarctica

Geographical features include:

- Bezden Peak
- Chepino Saddle
- Embree Glacier
- Fucha Peak
- Golemani Peak
- Kopsis Glacier
- Marsa Glacier
- Mount Hleven
- Mount Schmid
- Oreshak Peak
- Padala Glacier
- Panicheri Gap
- Patleyna Glacier
- Probuda Ridge

== Maps ==
- Vinson Massif. Scale 1:250 000 topographic map. Reston, Virginia: US Geological Survey, 1988.
- Antarctic Digital Database (ADD). Scale 1:250000 topographic map of Antarctica. Scientific Committee on Antarctic Research (SCAR). Since 1993, regularly updated.
