= Anevo Fortress =

Castle in Bulgaria

Coordinates: 42°40′40″N 24°44′2″E

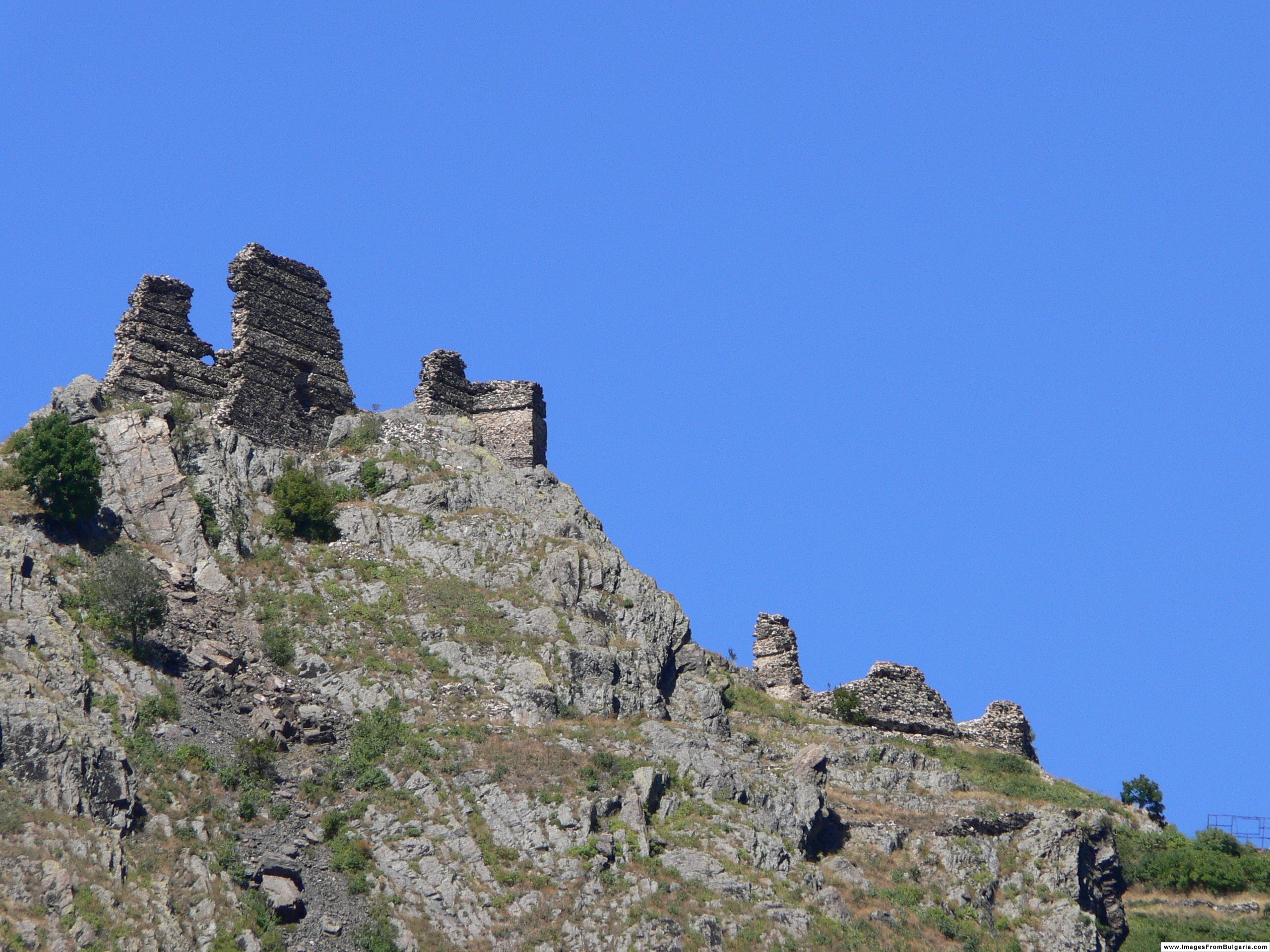
Ruins of Anevo Fortress

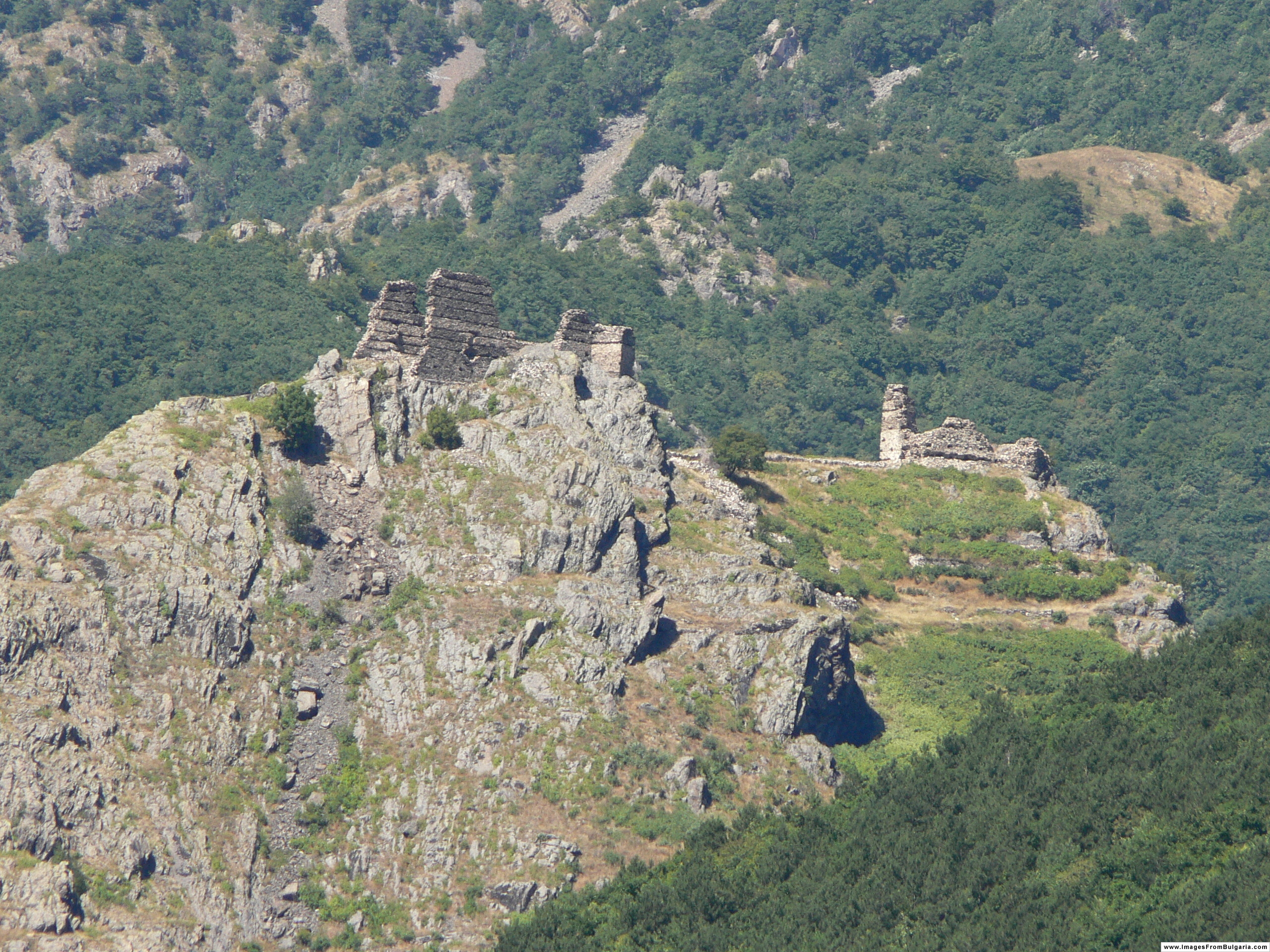
Farther view

The Anevo Fortress (Bulgarian: Аневско кале, Anevsko kale) or Kopsis (Копсис) is a medieval castle in central Bulgaria, the ruins of which are located some 3 kilometres (1.9 mi) from the village of Anevo in Sopot Municipality, Plovdiv Province. Constructed in the first half of the 12th century, it lies on a steep hilltop at the southern foot of the Balkan Mountains, not far from the Stryama river. In the end of the 13th century, the fortress was the capital of a small short-lived quasi-independent domain ruled by the brothers of Tsar Smilets of Bulgaria, Voysil and Radoslav.

== History and architecture ==
The hill where the Anevo Fortress is situated has been populated since no later than Antiquity (3rd–1st century BC), with habitation also evident throughout the Ancient Roman (1st–4th century), early Byzantine (5th–6th century) and Bulgarian (11th–14th century) periods of rule. The castle reached its heyday in the last quarter of the 13th century, when under the rule of the Bulgarian nobles (bolyari) Voysil and Radoslav it was the capital of a quasi-independent realm. The domain comprised the landholdings of the two renegade brothers of Tsar Smilets, which lay between the Balkan Mountains and Sredna Gora, approximately from modern Sliven west to Kopsis.

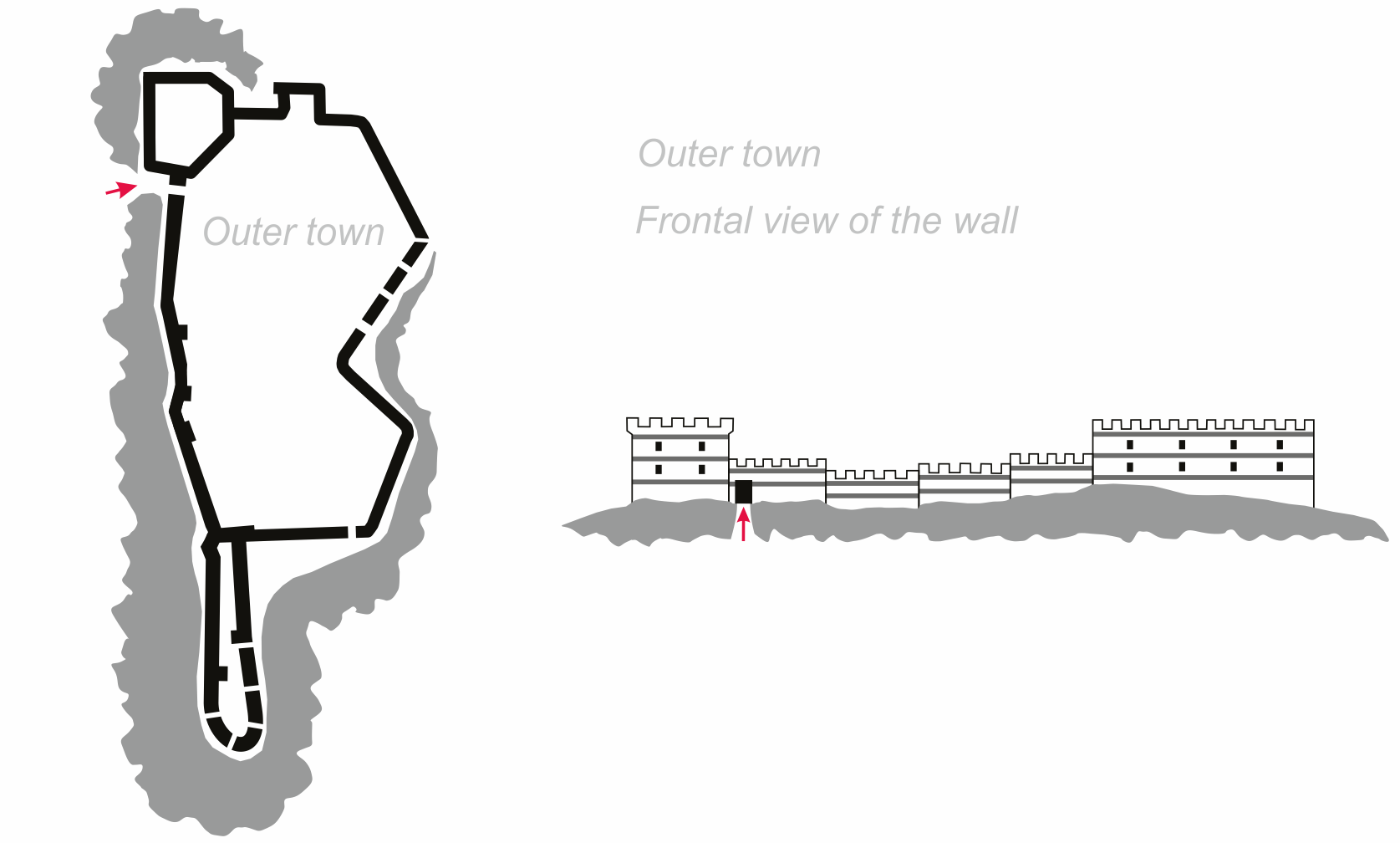
Plan of the medieval fortress Kopsis

The Anevo Fortress is dominated by its fortified inner city or citadel, surrounded by defensive walls with gates and towers. The entire fortress was around 7,000–8,000 square metres (75,000–86,000 sq ft) in area, of which 5,000 m^{2} (54,000 sq ft) are taken up by the citadel and other archaeological remains, the unfortified part of the city measured around 1,000 m^{2} (11,000 sq ft) and a monastery with adjacent buildings amounted to 1,000–1,500 m^{2} (11,000–16,000 sq ft). In total, the Anevo Fortress is thought to have had eight defensive towers, of which only several have been preserved. The towers are either rectangular or polygonal in shape, and their ruins reach up to 12 metres (39 feet) in height.

The western wall of the castle, flanked by a tower at each end, is in best condition. It is 96–110 m (315–361 ft) long and around 1.65 m (5.4 ft) thick. The walls were constructed according to the opus emplectum technology out of broken local stones and river stones welded together by means of white mortar. Residential buildings within the citadel were generally built of broken stones and white mortar and had most often one, though in some cases two or more floors. The foundations of four churches have been unearthed: two of those lay in the citadel and the remaining two were located outside of it. At least one of the churches boasts preserved traces of medieval frescoes and pavement. Pottery has also been discovered at the Anevo Fortress.

== See also ==
- Kopsis Glacier, in Antarctica, named after the fortress

== Bibliography ==
Notes

References

- Ćurčić, Slobodan (1997). Slobodan Ćurčić, Evangelia Hadjitryphonos (ed.). Secular medieval architecture in the Balkans 1300-1500 and its preservation. Aimos, Society for the Study of the Medieval Architecture in the Balkans and its Preservation. ISBN 978-960-86059-1-6.
- Jireček, Konstantin (1876). Geschichte der Bulgaren. Textor Verlag. p. 289. ISBN 978-3-938402-11-5.
- Делев, Петър; Кацунов, Валери; Митев, Пламен; Калинова, Евгения; Баева, Искра; Добрев, Боян (2006). "17. България през втората половина на ХІІІ в.: 4. Феодален сепаратизъм". История и цивилизация за 11. клас (in Bulgarian). Труд, Сирма АИ.
- Мутафчиев, Петър (1987). "Балканът в нашата история". In Васил Гюзелев (ed.). Книга за българите (in Bulgarian). София: Българска академия на науките. OCLC 181134325.
- Бакалов, Георги; Куманов, Милен (2003). Електронно издание "История на България" (in Bulgarian). София: Труд, Сирма. ISBN 954528613X.
