= Golemani Peak =

Mountain in Antarctica

Location of Sentinel Range in Western Antarctica.

Sentinel Range map.

Golemani Peak (Bulgarian: връх Големани, romanized: vrah Golemani, IPA: [ˈvrɤɣ ɡolɛˈmani]) is the peak rising to 2976 m in the Bangey Heights of north-central Sentinel Range in Ellsworth Mountains, Antarctica. It surmounts Patleyna Glacier to the southwest, Marsa Glacier to the north and Padala Glacier to the east.

The peak is named after the settlements of Golemani and Golemanite in Northern Bulgaria.

== See also ==
- Mountains in Antarctica

== Location ==
Golemani Peak is located at 78°03′12″S 85°41′44″W, which is 3.23 km north of Bezden Peak, 6.17 km northeast of Mount Todd, 7.87 km southeast of Mount Goldthwait, 5.06 km south-southwest of Mount Schmid and 12.17 km west-northwest of Zimornitsa Peak. US mapping in 1961, updated in 1988.

== Maps ==
- Vinson Massif. Scale 1:250 000 topographic map. Reston, Virginia: US Geological Survey, 1988.
