= Lyulyakovo, Burgas Province =

Lyulyakovo Люляково
- Village
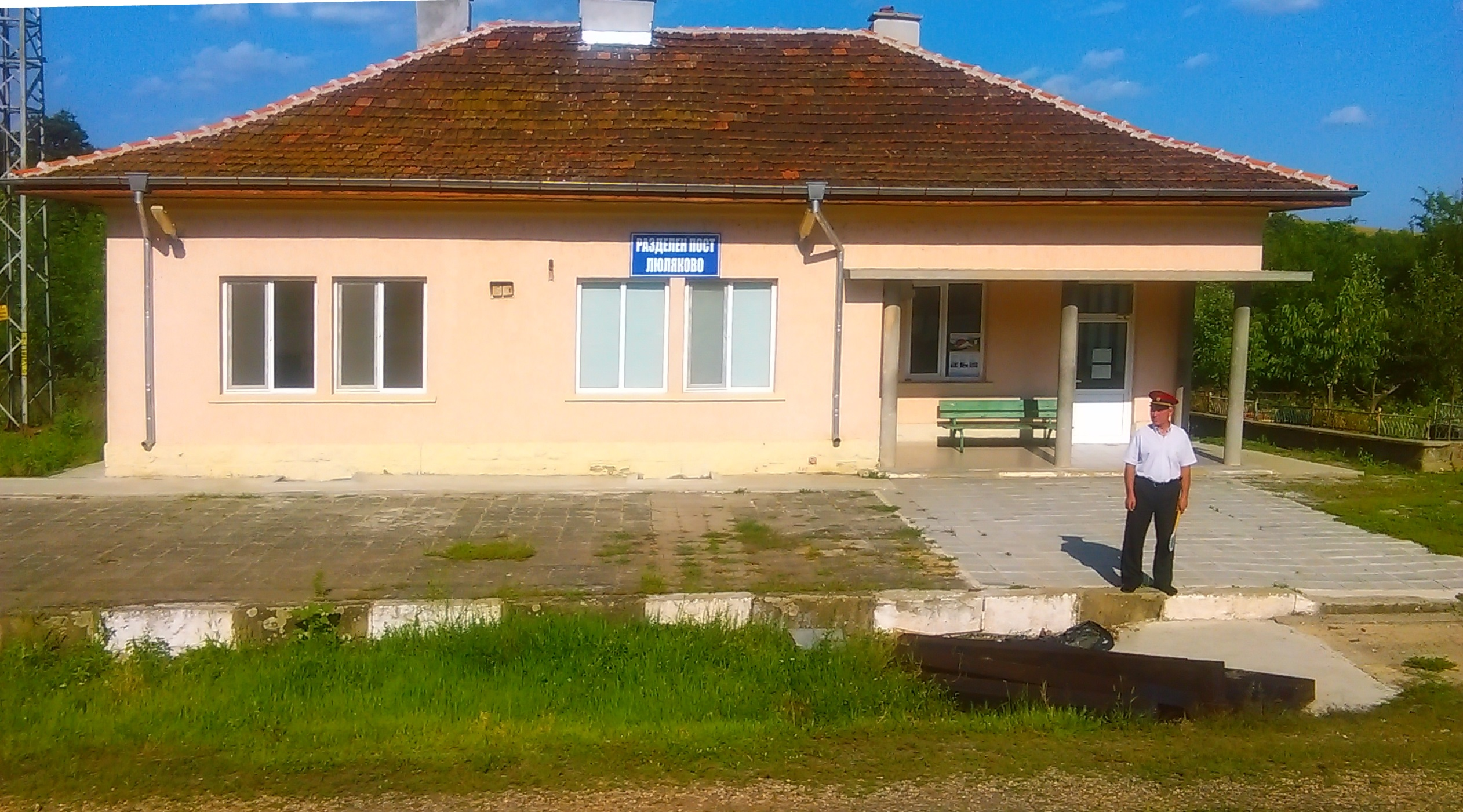

- Location of Lyulyakovo
- Coordinates: 42°52′N 27°05′E
- Country: Bulgaria
- Province: Burgas Province
- Municipality: Ruen Municipality

Government
  - Mayor: Hazim Tefik Hussein
- Elevation: 215 m (705 ft)
- Time zone: UTC+2 (EET)
  - Summer (DST): UTC+3 (EEST)
- Postal code: 8570

Lyulyakovo is a village in Ruen Municipality, Burgas Province, in southeastern Bulgaria.

== Transport ==
Lyulyakovo has a connection to Karnobat through the Sindel-Karnobat railway.
