= Roberts Peak =

Mountain in Antarctica

Location of Sentinel Range in Western Antarctica.

Sentinel Range map.

Roberts Peak (78°14′S 85°10′W) is a peak (1,800 m) in the south extremity of Maglenik Heights, standing on the north side of Ellen Glacier and 10 km east of Mount Jumper in central Sentinel Range, Ellsworth Mountains. It was named by the Advisory Committee on Antarctic Names (US-ACAN) in 1996 after Carol A. Roberts, Deputy Director, Office of Polar Programs, National Science Foundation, 1988–96, who represented U.S. research interests on behalf of the National Science Foundation within the Antarctic Treaty system.

== See also ==
- Mountains in Antarctica

== Maps ==
- Vinson Massif. Scale 1:250 000 topographic map. Reston, Virginia: US Geological Survey, 1988.
- Antarctic Digital Database (ADD). Scale 1:250000 topographic map of Antarctica. Scientific Committee on Antarctic Research (SCAR). Since 1993, regularly updated.
