= Chapman Peak (Antarctica) =

Peak in the Maglenik Heights, Antarctica

Location of Sentinel Range in Western Antarctica.

Sentinel Range map.

Chapman Peak (78°11′S 85°13′W) is a peak, 2,230 metres (7,320 ft) high, in the Maglenik Heights, on the east side of Ellen Glacier and west of Arapya Glacier, 5 miles (8 km) northeast of Mount Jumper in the central Sentinel Range of the Ellsworth Mountains, Antarctica. It was first mapped by the U.S. Geological Survey from surveys and from U.S. Navy air photos, 1957–59, and named by the Advisory Committee on Antarctic Names for Captain John H. Chapman, USAF, who participated in establishing the International Geophysical Year South Pole Station in the 1956–57 season.

== See also ==
- Mountains in Antarctica

== Maps ==
- Vinson Massif. Scale 1:250 000 topographic map. Reston, Virginia: US Geological Survey, 1988.
- Antarctic Digital Database (ADD). Scale 1:250000 topographic map of Antarctica. Scientific Committee on Antarctic Research (SCAR). Since 1993, regularly updated.
