= Hoek Glacier =

Glacier in Antarctica

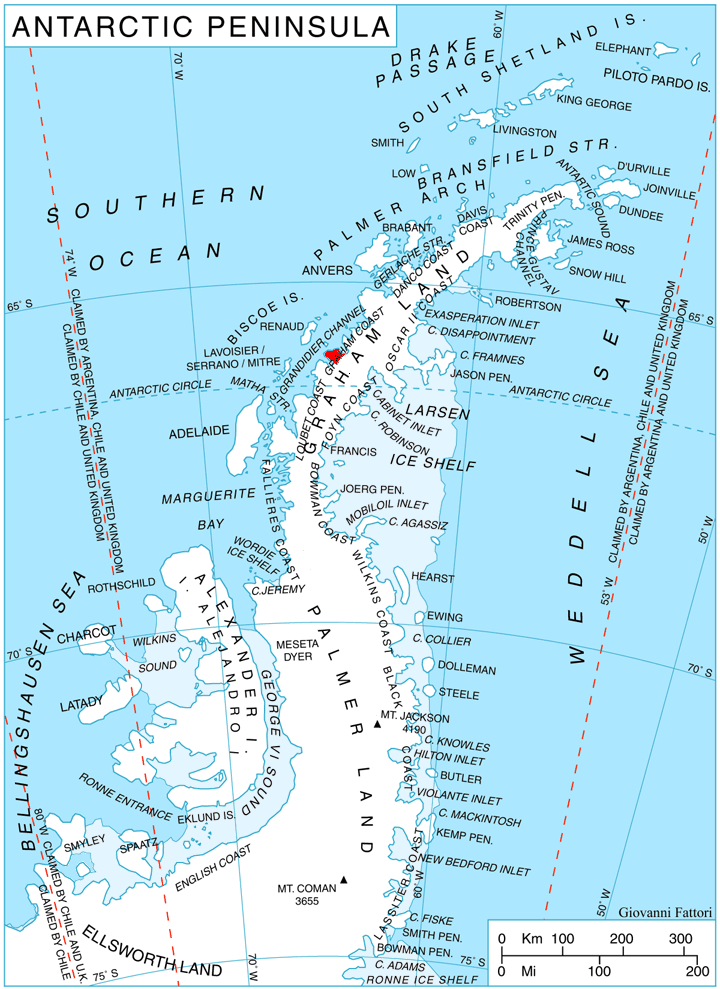
Location of Velingrad Peninsula on Graham Coast, Antarctic Peninsula.

Hoek Glacier (66°0′S 65°4′W) is a glacier flowing into Dimitrov Cove northeast of Veshka Point on the northwest coast of Velingrad Peninsula on Graham Coast in Graham Land, Antarctica, southward of the Llanquihue Islands. It was charted by the British Graham Land Expedition under John Rymill, 1934–37, and was named by the UK Antarctic Place-Names Committee in 1959 for Henry W. Hoek (1878–1951), a pioneer Swiss (formerly German) ski-mountaineer and author of one of the earliest skiing manuals.

== Maps ==
- British Antarctic Territory. Scale 1:200000 topographic map. DOS 610 Series, Sheet W 65 64. Directorate of Overseas Surveys, Tolworth, UK, 1971.
- British Antarctic Territory. Scale 1:200000 topographic map. DOS 610 Series, Sheet W 66 64. Directorate of Overseas Surveys, Tolworth, UK, 1976.
