= Razboyna, Targovishte Province =

Razboyna Разбойна
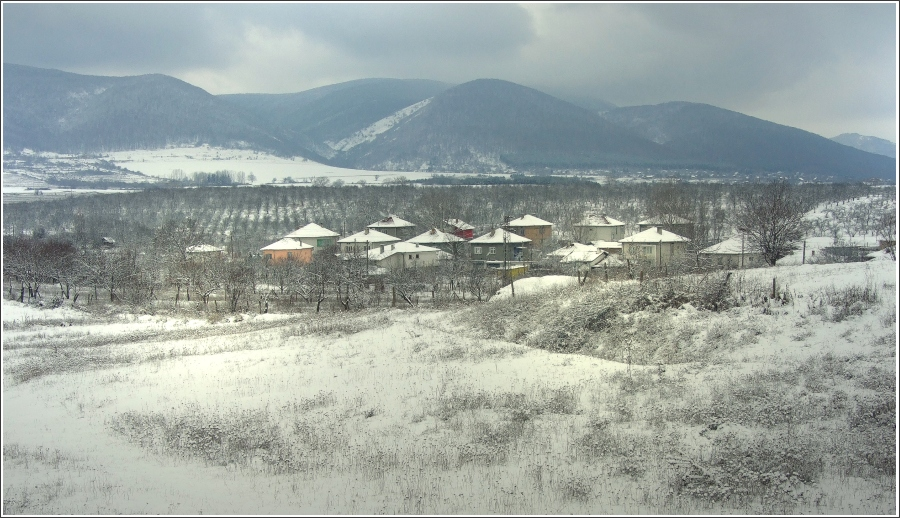
- winter view with the Preslav Mountain in the background

- Location of Razboyna
- Coordinates: 43°13′14″N 26°33′33″E
- Country: Bulgaria
- Provinces (Oblast): Targovishte
- Municipality (Obshtina): Targovishte

Population (2009)
  - Total: 559
- Time zone: UTC+2 (EET)
  - Summer (DST): UTC+3 (EEST)
- Postal code: 7707

Razboyna (Bulgarian: Разбойна) is a village in the northeastern part of Bulgaria in Targovishte Municipality, Targovishte Province.

Razboyna is at the northern foot of the Preslav Mountain just by the ring road of Targovishte. The village lies in the vicinity of the Polyanitsa Reservoir. Although it has its own mayoralty, the village is considered as a quarter or suburb of the town of Targovishte. It is connected to the town's public transport system.

The majority of Razboyna's population consist of Turks who are Sunni Muslims, closely followed by Bulgarians who are Orthodox Christians. Its population mostly settled in Razboyna during the communist rule. There is a community centre (chitalishte) in the village, registered as number 2750 by the Ministry of Culture (Bulgaria). The road that pass through Razboyna leads to a forest land, called Sondite, which is part of the Preslav Mountain. The site is known for its glades filled with lilac shrubs and red peonies.

== Gallery ==
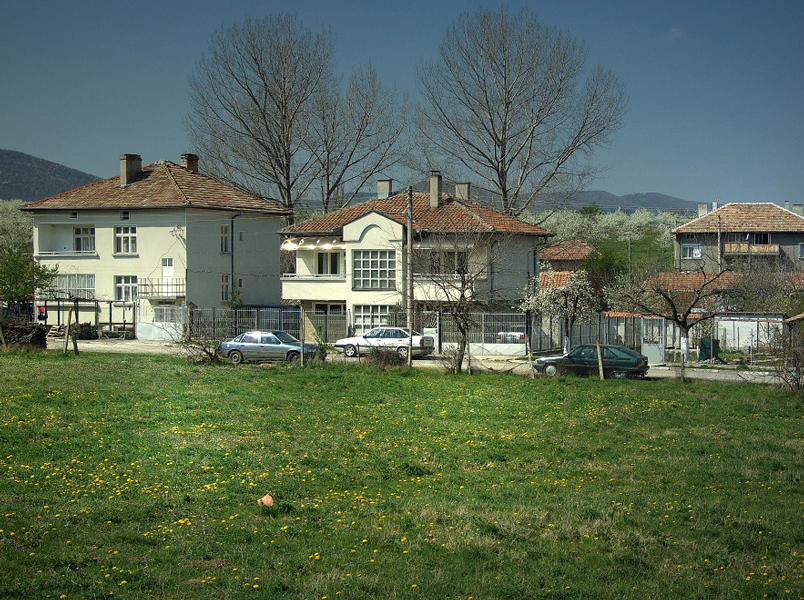
View of Razboyna

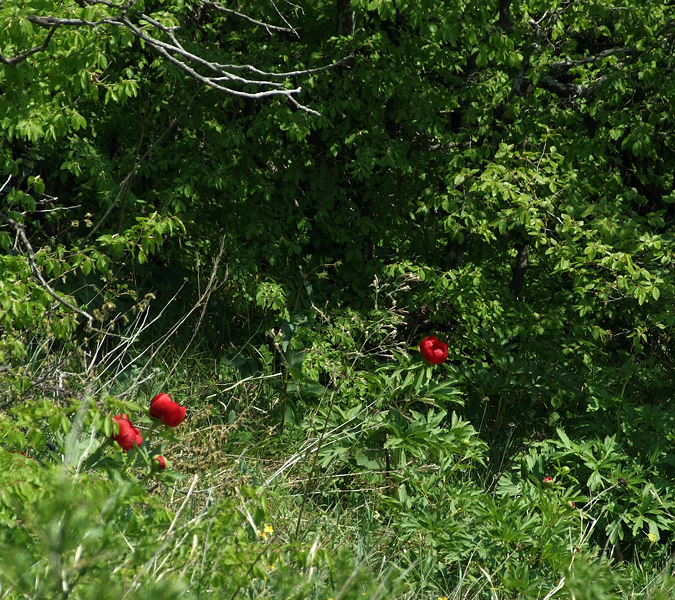
peonies in the Sondite site

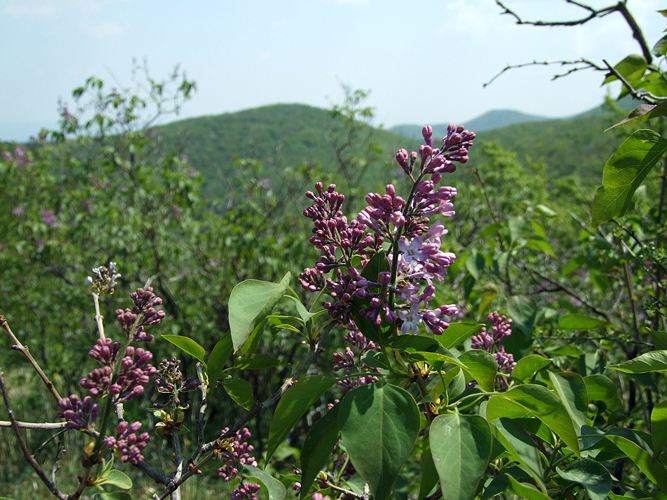
lilac-shrubs in the Sondite site
