= Barnes Ridge (Missouri) =

Ridge in Missouri, U.S.

Coordinates: 36°40′45″N 89°24′04″W

Barnes Ridge is a ridge in New Madrid County in the U.S. state of Missouri.

Barnes Ridge has the name of the local Barnes family of pioneers.
