= Razboyna, Burgas Province =

Razboyna
- Village
- Location within Bulgaria
- Coordinates: 42°48′N 27°23′E
- Country: Bulgaria
- Province: Burgas Province
- Municipality: Ruen Municipality

Area
  - Total: 14.0 km^{2} (5.4 sq mi)

Population (2011)
  - Total: 817
  - Density: 61.38/km^{2} (159.0/sq mi)
- Time zone: UTC+2 (EET)
  - Summer (DST): UTC+3 (EEST)

Razboyna or Razbojna is a village in Ruen Municipality, in Burgas Province, in southeastern Bulgaria. The total area of the village is roughly 14km², with a population of 858 (per the 2016 estimate) indicating a population density of 61.38/km²
