= Chepino Saddle =

Saddle in Ellsworth Mountains, Antarctica

Location of Sentinel Range in Western Antarctica

Sentinel Range map

Chepino Saddle (Bulgarian: Чепинска седловина, ‘Chepinska Sedlovina’ \'che-pin-ska se-dlo-vi-'na\) is the saddle of elevation 2526 m in north-central Sentinel Range in Ellsworth Mountains, Antarctica, linking Probuda Ridge to the southwest to Bangey Heights to the northeast. It is part of the glacial divide between Embree Glacier to the north and Ellen Glacier to the south.

The saddle is named after the settlement of Chepino in Western Bulgaria and the homonymous Chepino Valley in Southern Bulgaria.

== Location ==
Chepino Saddle is centred at 78°05′44″S 85°45′13″W. US mapping in 1961, updated in 1988.

== Maps ==
- Vinson Massif. Scale 1:250 000 topographic map. Reston, Virginia: US Geological Survey, 1988.
- Antarctic Digital Database (ADD). Scale 1:250000 topographic map of Antarctica. Scientific Committee on Antarctic Research (SCAR). Since 1993, regularly updated.
