= Arapya Glacier =

Glacier in Antarctica

- Location of Sentinel Range in Western Antarctica

- Location within Antarctica
- Location: Ellsworth Land
- Coordinates: 78°11′40″S 84°54′00″W
- Length: 11.4 km (7.1 mi)
- Width: 5 km (3.1 mi)
- Terminus: Ellen Glacier

Sentinel Range map.

Arapya Glacier (Bulgarian: ледник Арапя, romanized: lednik Arapya, IPA: [ˈlɛdnik ɐrɐˈpʲa]) is the 11.4 kilometres (7.1 mi) long and 5 kilometres (3.1 mi) wide glacier on the east side of north-central Sentinel Range in Ellsworth Mountains, Antarctica, situated south of Young Glacier. It flows southwards along the west side of Barnes Ridge and east of Chapman Peak and joins Ellen Glacier southwest of Mount Besch.

The glacier is named after the seaside locality of Arapya in Southeastern Bulgaria.

== Location ==
Arapya Glacier is centred at 78°11′40″S 84°54′00″W. US mapping in 1961, updated in 1988.

== See also ==
- List of glaciers in the Antarctic
- Glaciology

== Maps ==
- Vinson Massif. Scale 1:250 000 topographic map. Reston, Virginia: US Geological Survey, 1988.
- Antarctic Digital Database (ADD). Scale 1:250000 topographic map of Antarctica. Scientific Committee on Antarctic Research (SCAR). Since 1993, regularly updated.
