= Barnes Ridge (Antarctica) =

Ridge in Antarctica

Location of Sentinel Range in Western Antarctica.

Sentinel Range map.

Barnes Ridge (78°8′S 84°50′W) is a ridge 7 nautical miles (13 km) long, rising to over 1,210 metres (3,970 ft) (Mount Besch) and extending between Young Glacier and Ellen Glacier at the east side of the Sentinel Range, Ellsworth Mountains in Antarctica. It is bounded by Rutford Ice Stream to the east and Arapya Glacier to the west, and connected to Maglenik Heights to the northwest by Dropla Gap. Its eastern slopes are drained by Ranuli Ice Piedmont.

The ridge was mapped by the United States Geological Survey from surveys and from U.S. Navy air photos, 1957–59, and was named by the Advisory Committee on Antarctic Names for Stephen S. Barnes, scientific leader at Byrd Station in 1958.

== Maps ==
- Vinson Massif. Scale 1:250 000 topographic map. Reston, Virginia: US Geological Survey, 1988.
- Antarctic Digital Database (ADD). Scale 1:250000 topographic map of Antarctica. Scientific Committee on Antarctic Research (SCAR). Since 1993, regularly updated.
