= Pripek, Burgas Province =

Pripek
- Village
- Location within Bulgaria
- Coordinates: 42°50′N 27°24′E
- Country: Bulgaria
- Province: Burgas Province
- Municipality: Ruen Municipality
- Time zone: UTC+2 (EET)
  - Summer (DST): UTC+3 (EEST)

Pripek is a village in Ruen Municipality, in Burgas Province, in southeastern Bulgaria.

Pripek Point on Graham Coast in Antarctica is named after the village.
