= Bezden Peak =

Antarctic mountain

Location of Sentinel Range in Western Antarctica.

Sentinel Range map.

Bezden Peak (Bulgarian: връх Безден, romanized: vrah Bezden, IPA: [ˈvrɤɣ ˈbɛzdɛn]) is the peak rising to 2975 m in the Bangey Heights of north-central Sentinel Range in Ellsworth Mountains, Antarctica. It is surmounting Patleyna Glacier to the north and Ellen Glacier to the south.

The peak is named after the settlement of in Western Bulgaria.

== Location ==
Bezden Peak is located at 78°04′57″S 85°42′07″W, which is 4.26 km east-northeast of Mount Todd, 9.9 km southeast of Mount Goldthwait, 3.23 km south of Golemani Peak and 5.6 km north-northwest of Voysil Peak. US mapping in 1961, updated in 1988.

== See also ==
- Mountains in Antarctica

== Maps ==
- Vinson Massif. Scale 1:250 000 topographic map. Reston, Virginia: US Geological Survey, 1988.
- Antarctic Digital Database (ADD). Scale 1:250000 topographic map of Antarctica. Scientific Committee on Antarctic Research (SCAR). Since 1993, regularly updated.
