= Ferin Head =

Headland of Graham Land, Antarctica

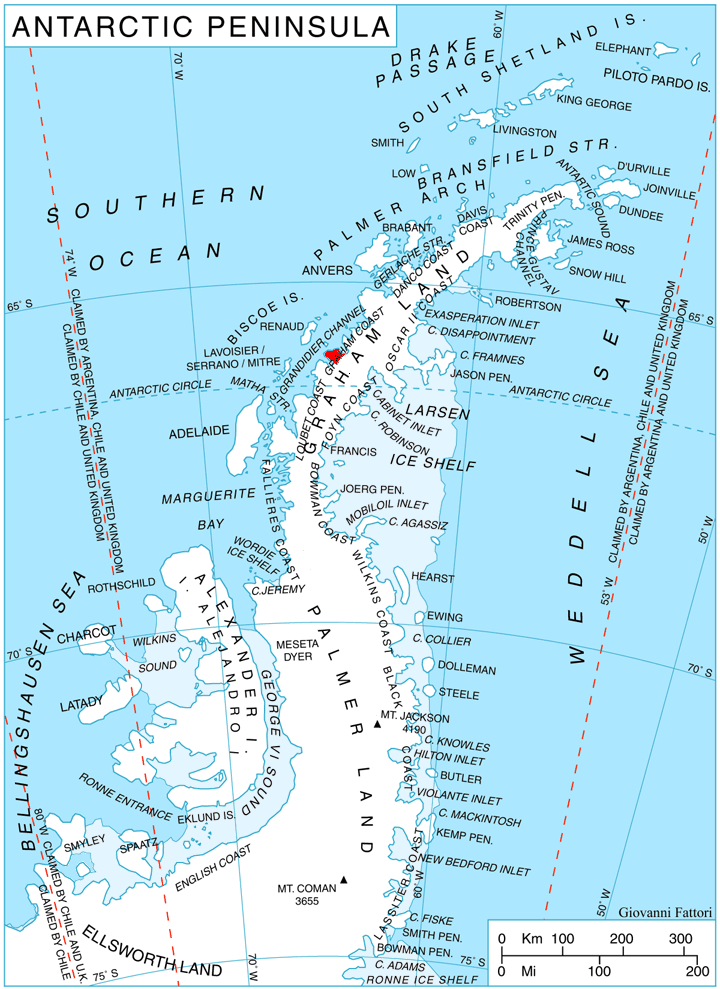
Location of Velingrad Peninsula on Graham Coast, Antarctic Peninsula.

Ferin Head (65°59′S 65°20′W) is a headland 4 nautical miles (7 km) north of the entrance to Holtedahl Bay, in the northwest of Velingrad Peninsula on the Graham Coast of Graham Land, Antarctica. It was discovered by the French Antarctic Expedition, 1908–10, who from a distant position in Pendleton Strait charted this feature as an island, which Jean-Baptiste Charcot named for A. Ferin, French Vice-consul at Ponta Delgada in the Azores. The British Graham Land Expedition (BGLE) under John Rymill, 1934–37, charted this coast and correlated their work with that of Charcot. Ferin Head, as here applied, is in accord with the BGLE interpretation.
