= Mount Besch =

Mountain in Ellsworth Land, Antarctica

Mount Besch (78°11′S 84°43′W) is a mountain (1,210 m) forming the south end of Barnes Ridge on the east side of Sentinel Range, Ellsworth Mountains. It is overlooking the terminus of Ellen Glacier to the south, Arapya Glacier to the west, and Ranuli Ice Piedmont to the northeast.

The mountain was first mapped by the United States Geological Survey (USGS) from surveys and U.S. Navy air photos, 1957–59. It was named by the Advisory Committee on Antarctic Names (US-ACAN) for Captain Marvin E. Besch of the United States Air Force (USAF), who participated in establishing the IGY South Pole Station in the 1956–57 season.

== See also ==
- Mountains in Antarctica
