= Mount Paulcke =

Mountain in Graham Land, Antarctica

Mount Paulcke (65°59′S 64°53′W) is a mountain, at least 915 m, standing west of Huitfeldt Point, Barilari Bay, on the west coast of Graham Land. Photographed by Hunting Aerosurveys Ltd. in 1956–57, and mapped from these photos by the Falkland Islands Dependencies Survey (FIDS). Named by the United Kingdom Antarctic Place-Names Committee (UK-APC) in 1959 for Wilhelm Paulcke (1873–1949), German pioneer exponent of skiing who, with three companions, demonstrated the possibilities of long distance ski-mountaineering for the first time.
