= Mount Gozur =

Mountain in Ellsworth Land, Antarctica

Location of Sentinel Range in Western Antarctica.

Sentinel Range map.

Mount Gozur (78°7′S 85°30′W) is a mountain, 2,980 metres (9,780 ft) high, in the Maglenik Heights of the central Sentinel Range, in the Ellsworth Mountains of Antarctica, situated just northwest of the head of Young Glacier and 9 nautical miles (17 km) east of Mount Bentley. It was first mapped by the United States Geological Survey from surveys and U.S. Navy air photos, from 1957 to 1959, and was named by the Advisory Committee on Antarctic Names for Captain Alexander Gozur of the United States Air Force, who participated in establishing the South Pole Station in the 1956–57 season.

== See also ==
- Mountains in Antarctica

== Maps ==
- Vinson Massif. Scale 1:250 000 topographic map. Reston, Virginia: US Geological Survey, 1988.
- Antarctic Digital Database (ADD). Scale 1:250000 topographic map of Antarctica. Scientific Committee on Antarctic Research (SCAR). Since 1993, regularly updated.
