= Kopsis Glacier =

Glacier in Antarctica

- Location of Sentinel Range in Western Antarctica

- Location within Antarctica
- Type: tributary
- Location: Ellsworth Land
- Coordinates: 78°03′20″S 85°16′00″W
- Length: 7 nautical miles (13 km; 8.1 mi)
- Width: 2 nautical miles (3.7 km; 2.3 mi)
- Thickness: unknown
- Terminus: Embree Glacier
- Status: unknown

Sentinel Range map.

Kopsis Glacier (Bulgarian: ледник Копсис, romanized: lednik Kopsis, IPA: [ˈlɛdnik ˈkɔpsis]) is a 7 nautical miles (13 km; 8.1 mi) long and 2 nautical miles (3.7 km; 2.3 mi) wide glacier on the east side of north-central Sentinel Range in Ellsworth Mountains, Antarctica that is draining northeastwards from Panicheri Gap, Voysil Peak and Mount Gozur to join Embree Glacier northwest of Mirovyane Peak.

The glacier is named after the medieval town of Kopsis in Central Bulgaria.

== Location ==
Kopsis Glacier is centred at 78°03′20″S 85°16′00″W. US mapping in 1961, updated in 1988.

== See also ==
- List of glaciers in the Antarctic
- Antarctic Place-names Commission
- Glaciology

== Maps ==
- Vinson Massif. Scale 1:250 000 topographic map. Reston, Virginia: US Geological Survey, 1988.
- Antarctic Digital Database (ADD). Scale 1:250000 topographic map of Antarctica. Scientific Committee on Antarctic Research (SCAR). Since 1993, regularly updated.
