= Young Glacier =

Glacier in Antarctica

- Location of Sentinel Range in Western Antarctica.

- Location within Antarctica
- Location: Maglenik Heights; Sentinel Range; Ellsworth Land
- Coordinates: 78°4′20″S 84°49′00″W
- Length: 8 nmi (15 km; 9 mi)
- Thickness: unknown
- Status: unknown

Sentinel Range map.

Young Glacier (78°4′S 84°49′W) is a glacier which flows from Mount Gozur and Ichera Peak in Maglenik Heights eastwards for 8 miles (13 km) and terminates at the north end of Barnes Ridge on the east side of Sentinel Range, Ellsworth Mountains in Antarctica. It was first mapped by the United States Geological Survey (USGS) from surveys and U.S. Navy air photos from 1957–59. It was named by the Advisory Committee on Antarctic Names (US-ACAN) for First Lieutenant Dale L. Young of the United States Air Force (USAF), who participated in establishing the South Pole Station in the 1956–57 season.

== See also ==
- List of glaciers in the Antarctic
- Glaciology

== Maps ==
- Vinson Massif. Scale 1:250 000 topographic map. Reston, Virginia: US Geological Survey, 1988.
- Antarctic Digital Database (ADD). Scale 1:250000 topographic map of Antarctica. Scientific Committee on Antarctic Research (SCAR). Since 1993, regularly updated.
