= Mount Schmid =

Mountain in Ellsworth Land, Antarctica

Location of Sentinel Range in Western Antarctica.

Northern Sentinel Range map.

Mount Schmid (77°58′S 85°40′W) is a mountain on the south side of Embree Glacier, rising 8 km east of Mount Goldthwait in Bangey Heights in the northern portion of the Sentinel Range, Antarctica. Mapped by USGS from surveys and US Navy air photos, 1957–59. Named by the US-ACAN for Captain Ernest A. Schmid, USAF, who participated in the establishment of the IGY South Pole Station during the 1956–57 season.
