= Ruen Municipality =

Coordinates: 42.8000°N 27.2830°E

Ruen Municipality Община Руен
- Municipality (Obshtina)
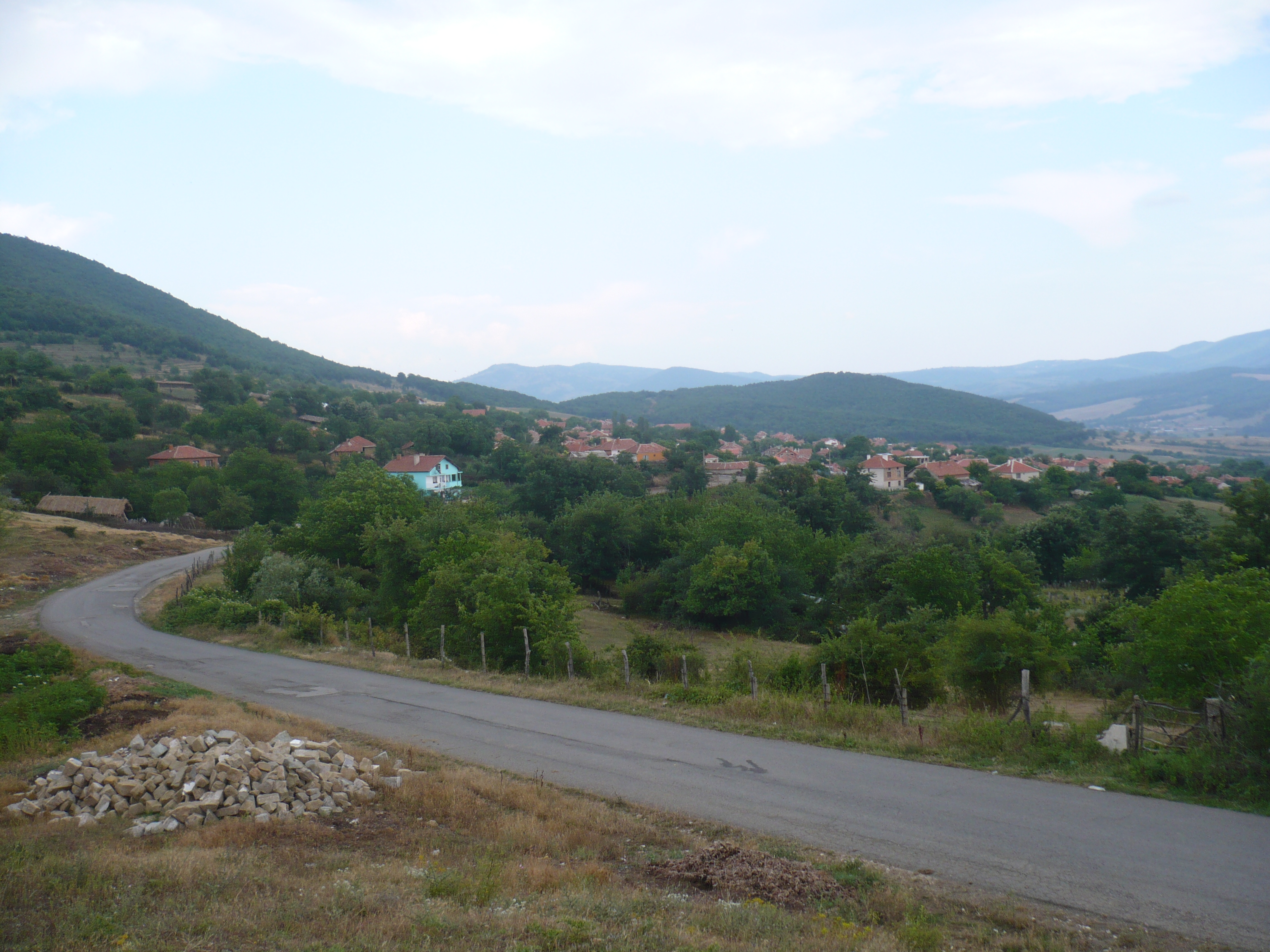
- Landscape near Planinitsa

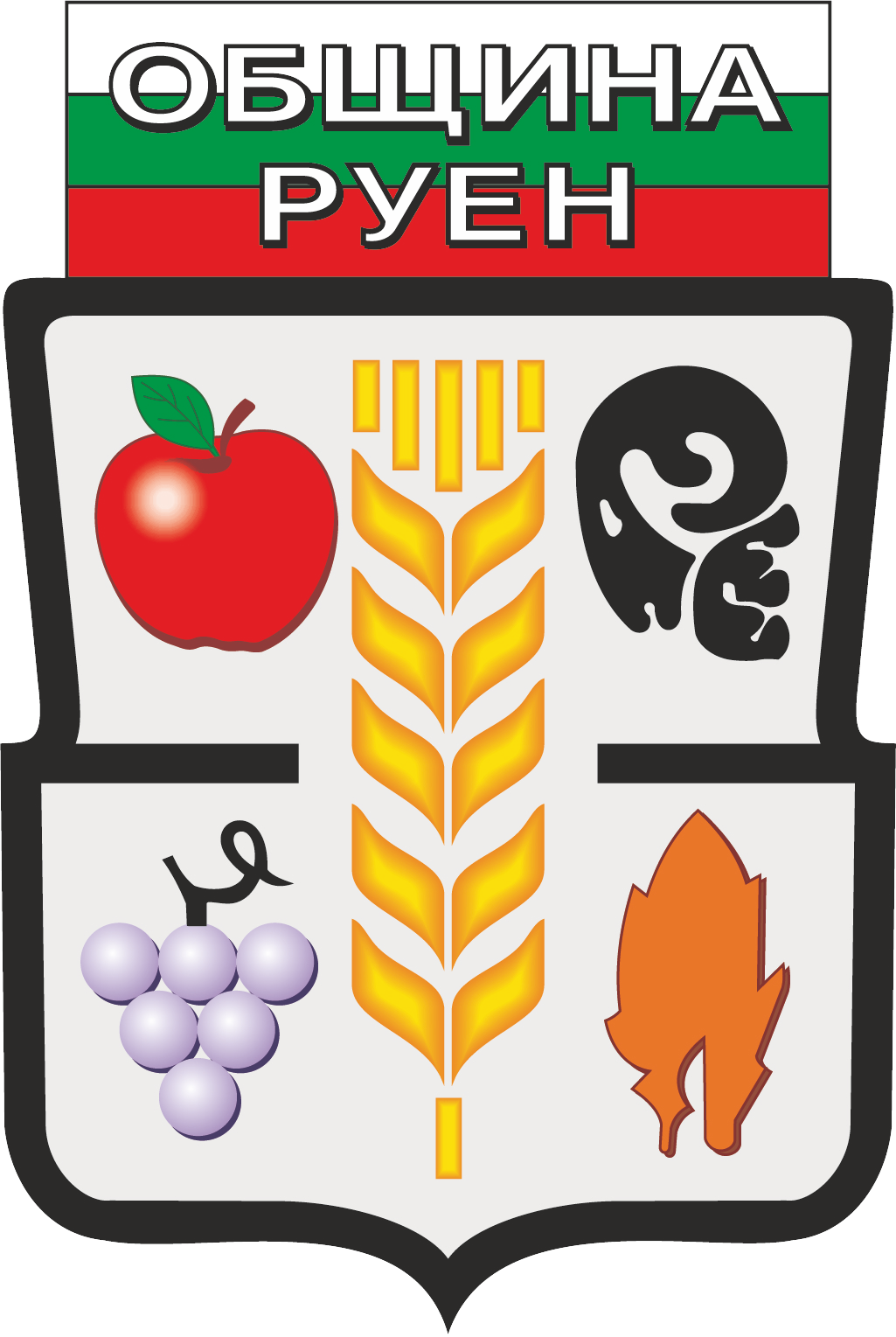
- Coat of arms

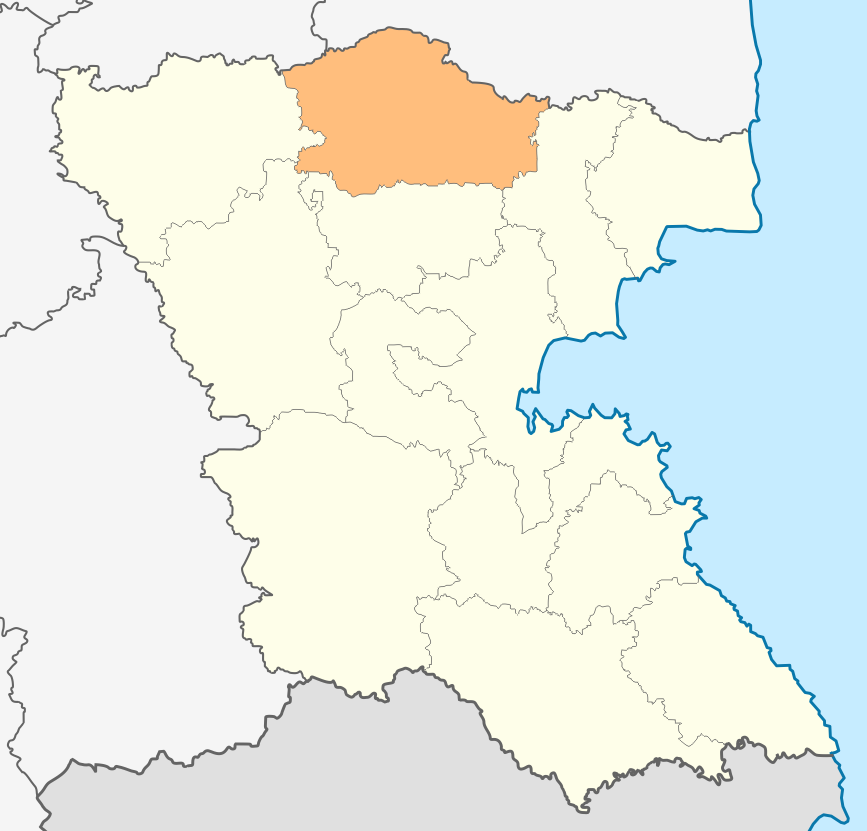
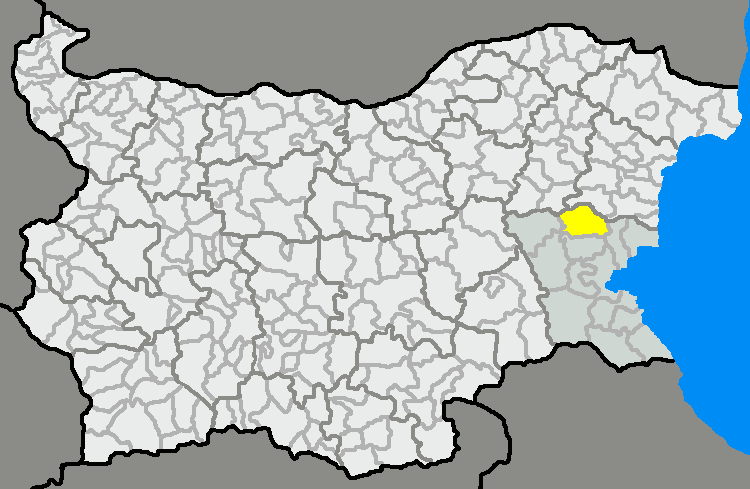
- Location in Burgas province Location on map of Bulgaria
- Country: Bulgaria
- Province (Oblast): Burgas
- Seat: Ruen

Area
  - Total: 689.94 km^{2} (266.39 sq mi)

Population (2011)
  - Total: 29,101
  - Density: 42.179/km^{2} (109.24/sq mi)
- Time zone: UTC+2 (EET)
  - Summer (DST): UTC+3 (EEST)
- Website: www.obstinaruen.com

Ruen Municipality (Bulgarian: Община Руен, Obshtina Ruen) is a municipality in Burgas Province, Bulgaria. It includes the town of Ruen and a number of villages.

== Demographics ==
According to the 2011 census, among those who answered the optional question on ethnic identification, the majority of the population declared to be part of the Turkish minority of Bulgarian. The municipality of Ruen has one of the highest concentration of Bulgarian Turks in the country with 87% its population belonging to this ethnic group. The percentage of ethnic Bulgarians is less than 7%, which is one of the lowest in Bulgaria. The municipality has also one of the highest share of Muslims: 87.5% declared to be part of the Muslim minority in Bulgaria.

=== Religion ===
According to the latest Bulgarian census of 2011, the religious composition, among those who answered the optional question on religious identification, was the following:

Religious composition of Ruen Municipality
Orthodox Christianity	5.8%
Catholicism	0.5%
Protestantism	0.2%
Islam	87.5%
No religion	1.0%
Prefer not to answer, others and indefinable	5.0%
