= Bulgarian toponyms in Antarctica (A) =

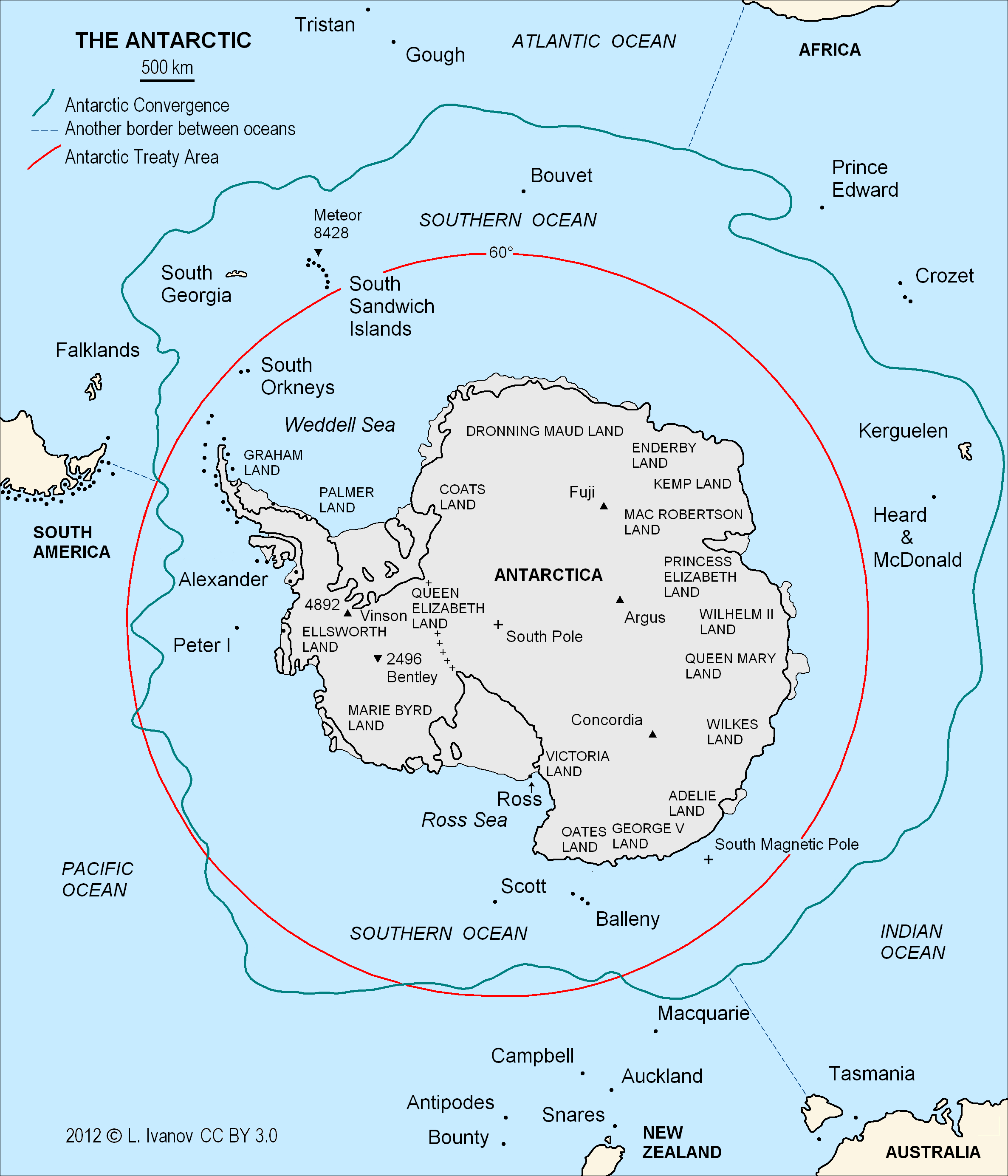
The South Polar Region.

- Abrit Nunatak, Trinity Peninsula
- Academia Peak, Livingston Island
- Acheron Lake, Livingston Island
- Afala Island, Nelson Island
- Agalina Glacier, Danco Coast
- Aglen Point, Livingston Island
- Aheloy Nunatak, Livingston Island
- Ahrida Peak, Sentinel Range
- Ahtopol Peak, Livingston Island
- Akaga Glacier, Nordenskjöld Coast
- Akin Island, Nelson Island
- Akra Peninsula, Oscar II Coast
- Aktinia Beach, Snow Island
- Akula Island, Wilhelm Archipelago
- Alabak Island, Graham Coast
- Albatros Point, Trinity Island
- Albena Peninsula, Brabant Island
- Alcheh Island, Biscoe Islands
- Aldomir Ridge, Trinity Peninsula
- Aleko Point, Livingston Island
- Aleksandrov Peak, Graham Coast
- Aleksandrov Ridge, Alexander Island
- Aleksiev Glacier, Nordenskjöld Coast
- Alepu Rocks, Robert Island
- Alfatar Peninsula, Robert Island
- Alfeus Island, Smith Island
- Alino Island, Biscoe Islands
- Alka Island, Trinity Island
- Altimir Glacier, Anvers Island
- Altsek Nunatak, Greenwich Island
- Aluzore Gap, Brabant Island
- Amadok Point, Livingston Island
- Ami Boué Bluff, Trinity Peninsula
- Anchialus Glacier, Sentinel Range
- Andreev Nunatak, Oscar II Coast
- Angelov Island, South Orkney Islands
- Antim Peak, Smith Island
- Antonov Peak, Trinity Peninsula
- Apiaria Bight, Brabant Island
- Aprilov Point, Greenwich Island
- Arapya Glacier, Sentinel Range
- Arbanasi Nunatak, Livingston Island
- Archar Peninsula, Greenwich Island
- Arda Peak, Livingston Island
- Argonavt Cove, Nelson Island
- Aripleri Passage, Trinity Peninsula
- Aristotle Mountains, Oscar II Coast
- Arkovna Ridge, Oscar II Coast
- Arkutino Beach, Livingston Island
- Armira Glacier, Smith Island
- Armula Peak, Loubet Coast
- Arrowsmith Island, Biscoe Islands
- Arsela Peak, Sentinel Range
- Artanes Bay, Oscar II Coast
- Arzos Peak, Sentinel Range
- Asemus Beach, Robert Island
- Asen Peak, Livingston Island
- Asparuh Peak, Livingston Island
- Atanasoff Nunatak, Livingston Island
- Atanasov Ridge, Alexander Island
- Atanasova Point, Livingston Island
- Atlantic Club Ridge, Livingston Island
- Aurelia Island, Low Island
- Austa Ridge, Oscar II Coast
- Avitohol Point, Livingston Island
- Avren Rocks, Robert Island
- Avroleva Heights, Brabant Island
- Aytos Point, Livingston Island

== See also ==
- Bulgarian toponyms in Antarctica

== Bibliography ==
- J. Stewart. Antarctica: An Encyclopedia. Jefferson, N.C. and London: McFarland, 2011. 1771 pp. ISBN 978-0-7864-3590-6
- L. Ivanov. Bulgarian Names in Antarctica. Sofia: Manfred Wörner Foundation, 2021. Second edition. 539 pp. ISBN 978-619-90008-5-4 (in Bulgarian)
- G. Bakardzhieva. Bulgarian toponyms in Antarctica. Paisiy Hilendarski University of Plovdiv: Research Papers. Vol. 56, Book 1, Part A, 2018 – Languages and Literature, pp. 104-119 (in Bulgarian)
- L. Ivanov and N. Ivanova. Bulgarian names. In: The World of Antarctica. Generis Publishing, 2022. pp. 114-115. ISBN 979-8-88676-403-1
