= Dioptra Island =

Antarctic Island

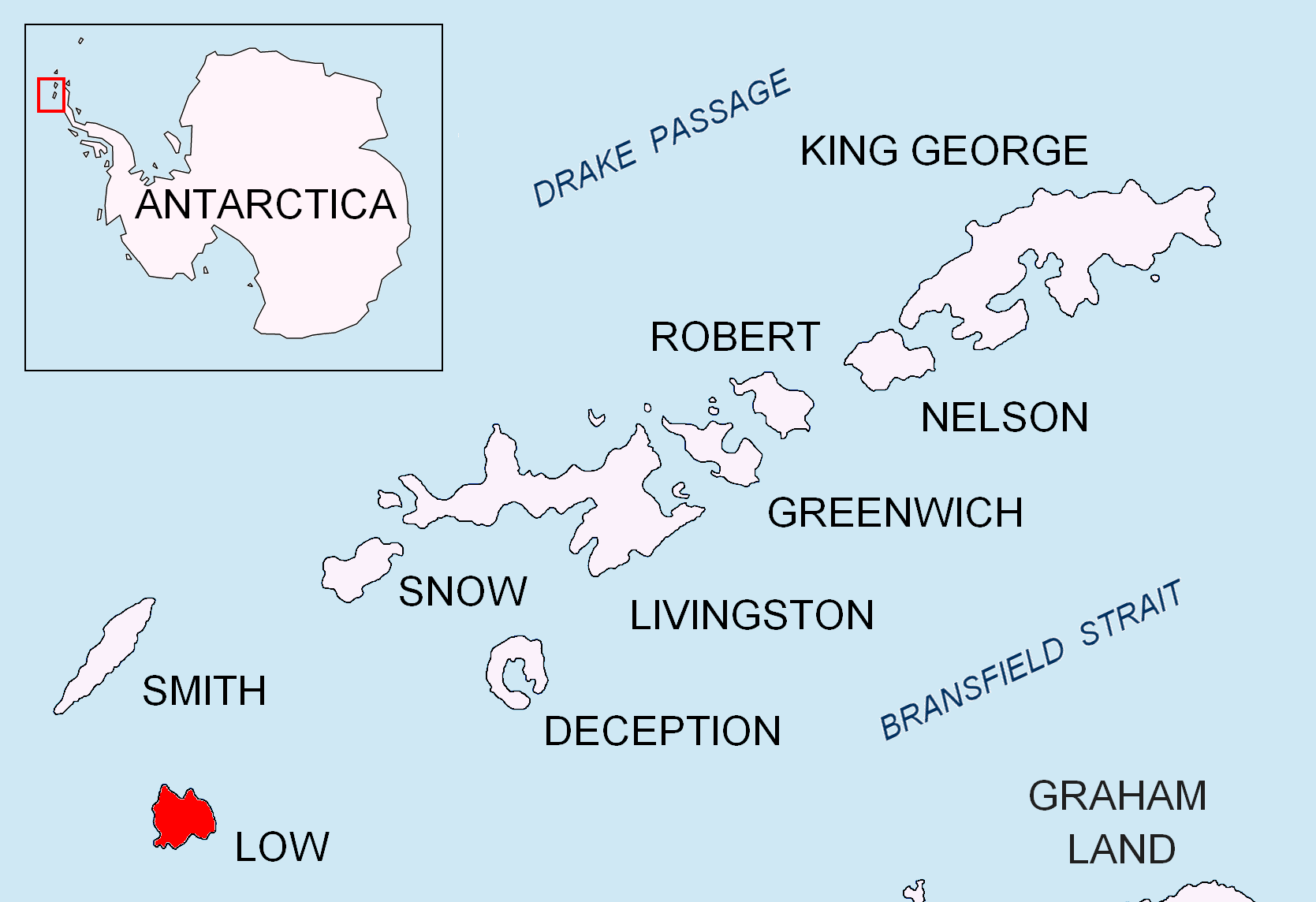
- Location of Low Island in the South Shetland Islands

- Location within Antarctica Location within South Shetland Islands

Geography
- Location: Antarctica
- Coordinates: 63°13′01.7″S 62°11′33″W
- Archipelago: South Shetland Islands
- Area: 0.92 ha (2.3 acres)
- Length: 290 m (950 ft)
- Width: 45 m (148 ft)

Administration
- Administered under the Antarctic Treaty

Demographics
- Population: uninhabited

Dioptra Island (Bulgarian: остров Диоптра, romanized: ostrov Dioptra, IPA: [ˈɔstrov diˈɔptrɐ]) is the conspicuous 290 m long in east-west direction and 45 m wide rocky island off the northwest extremity of Low Island in the South Shetland Islands, and separated from Beslen Island on the southeast by a passage narrowing to 21 m at points. Its surface area is 0.92 ha.

The feature is named after the classical surveying instrument dioptra, and in association with other names in the area deriving from the early development or use of geodetic instruments and methods.

== Location ==
Dioptra Island is located at 63°13′14″S 62°11′11″W, which is 6.09 km northwest of Venev Point and 1.57 km northeast of Cape Wallace. British mapping in 2009.

== See also ==
- List of Antarctic and subantarctic islands

== Maps ==
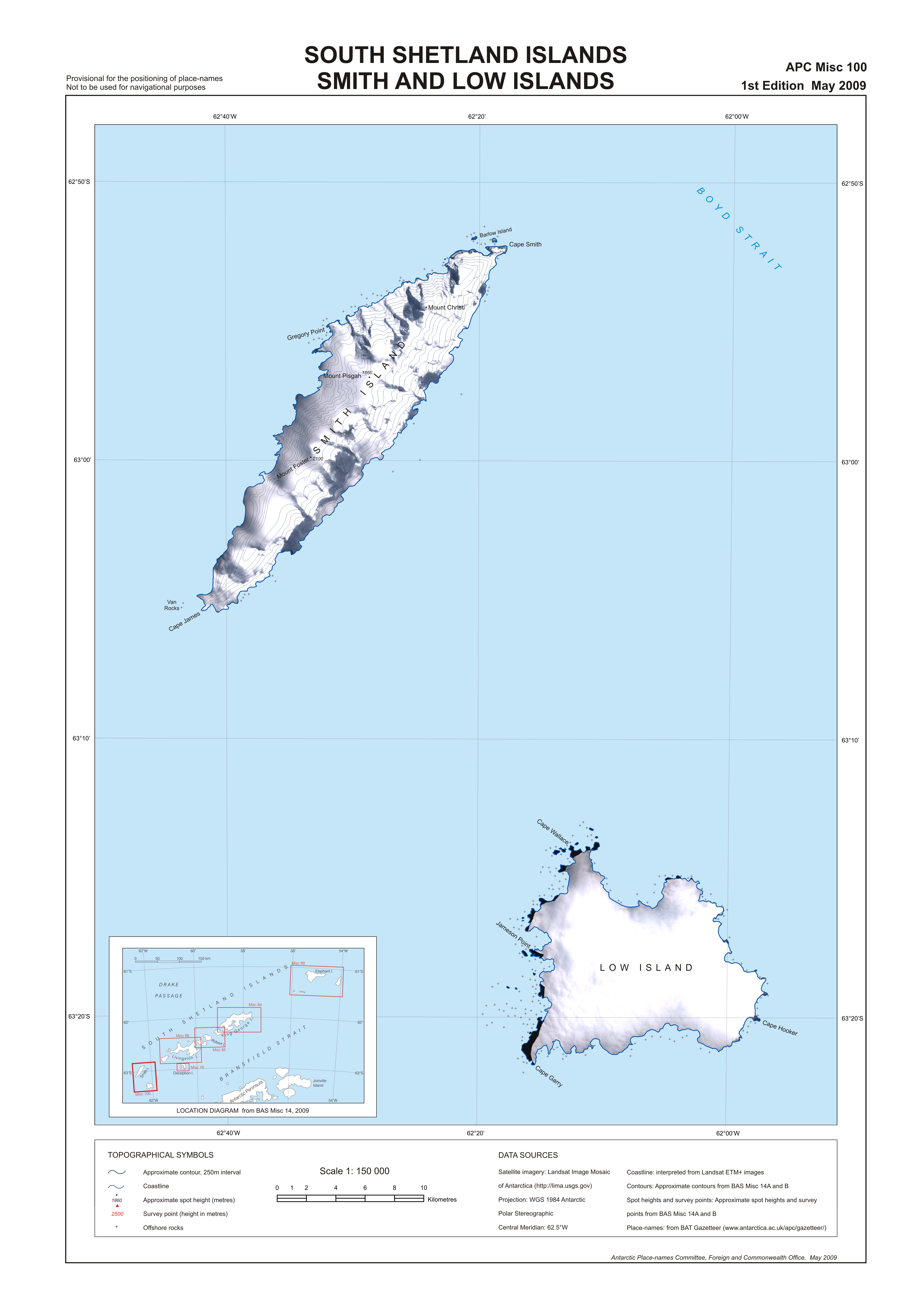
Map of Smith and Low Islands in the South Shetland Islands

- South Shetland Islands: Smith and Low Islands. Scale 1:150000 topographic map No. 13677. British Antarctic Survey, 2009
- Antarctic Digital Database (ADD). Scale 1:250000 topographic map of Antarctica. Scientific Committee on Antarctic Research (SCAR). Since 1993, regularly upgraded and updated
