= Teshel Cove =

Cove in the South Shetland Islands, Antarctica

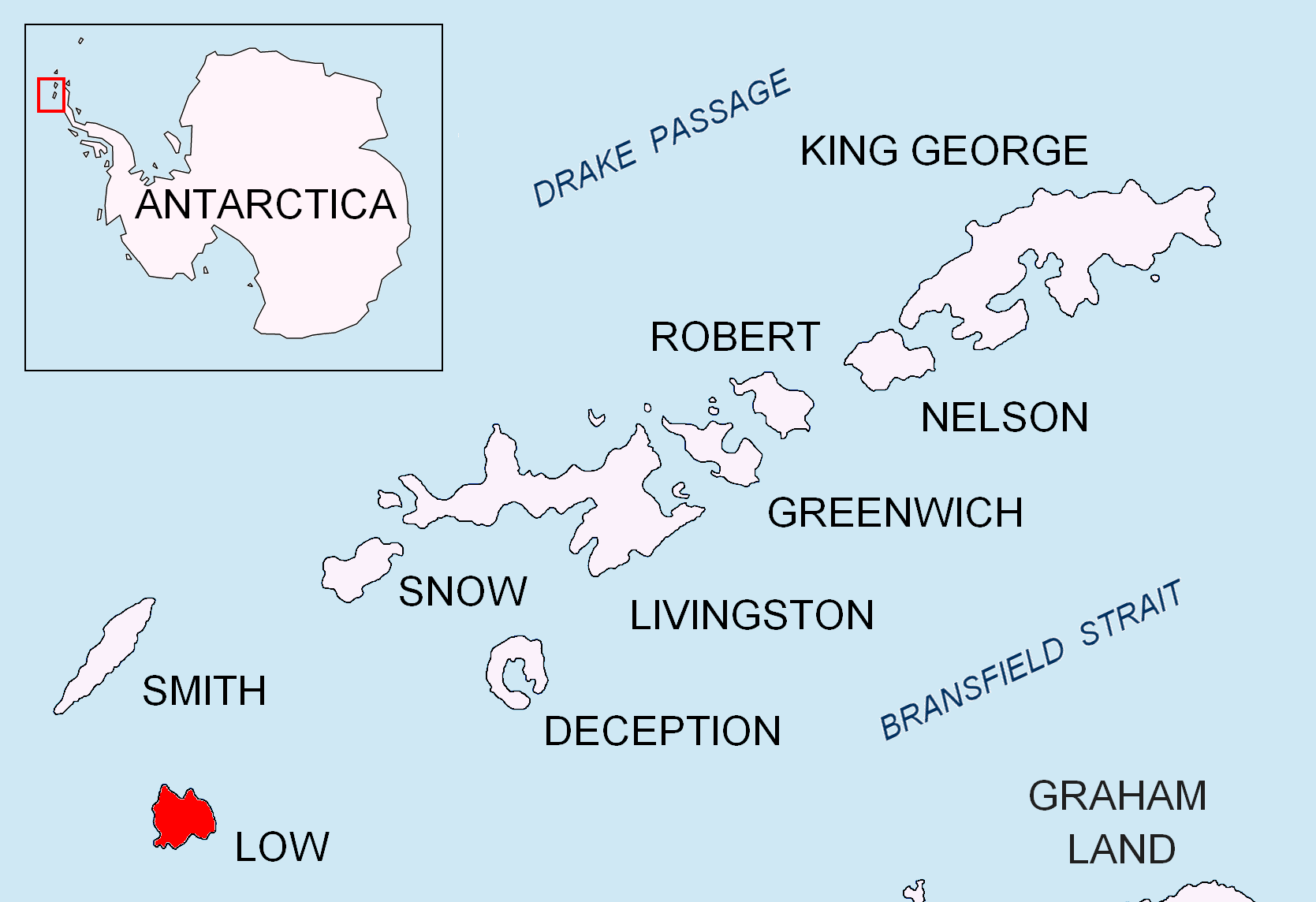
Location of Low Island in the South Shetland Islands.

Teshel Cove (Bulgarian: залив Тешел, ‘Zaliv Teshel’ \'za-liv 'tr-shel\) is the 1.4 km wide cove indenting for 1.6 km the west coast of Low Island in the South Shetland Islands, Antarctica. Situated north of Malina Cove and south by west of Kazichene Cove, 8.3 km north of Cape Garry and 6.7 km south by west of Cape Wallace.

The cove is named after the settlement of Teshel in southern Bulgaria.

== Location ==
Teshel Cove is centred at 63°17′17″S 62°15′08″W. British mapping in 2009.

== Maps ==
- South Shetland Islands: Smith and Low Islands. Scale 1:150000 topographic map No. 13677. British Antarctic Survey, 2009.
- Antarctic Digital Database (ADD). Scale 1:250000 topographic map of Antarctica. Scientific Committee on Antarctic Research (SCAR). Since 1993, regularly upgraded and updated.
