= Presnakov Island =

Island in Antarctica

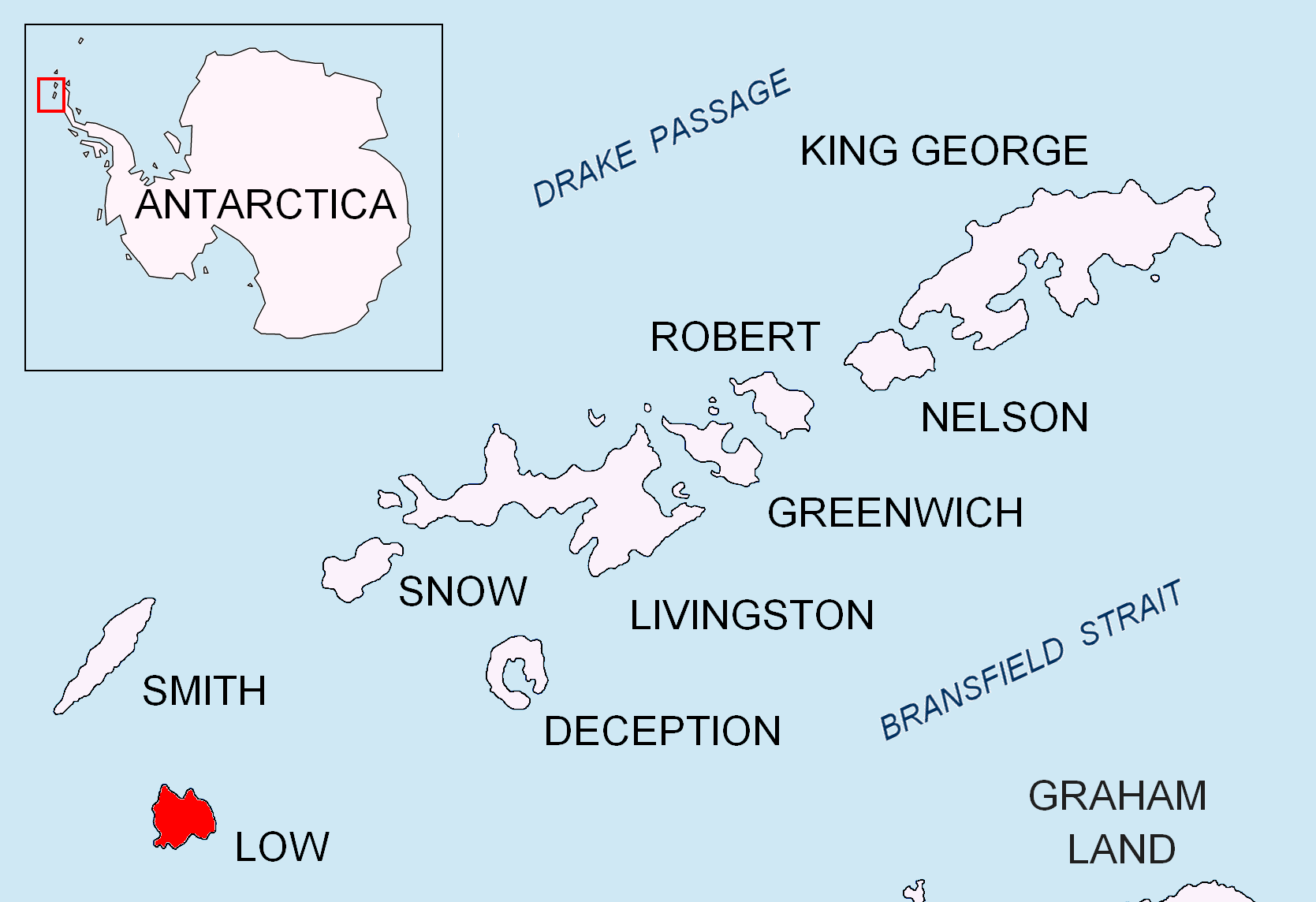
- Location of Low Island in the South Shetland Islands

- Location within Antarctica Location within Antarctic Peninsula

Geography
- Location: Antarctica
- Coordinates: 63°17′46″S 62°16′21″W
- Archipelago: South Shetland Islands
- Length: 390 m (1280 ft)
- Width: 100 m (300 ft)

Administration
- Antarctica
- Administered under the Antarctic Treaty System

Demographics
- Population: uninhabited

Presnakov Island (Bulgarian: Преснаков остров, romanized: Presnakov ostrov, IPA: [prɛsnɐˈkɔf ˈɔstrof]) is the 390 m long in southeast–northwest direction and 100 m wide rocky island lying off the west coast of Low Island in the South Shetland Islands, Antarctica.

The island is “named after Captain Ivan Presnakov (1932–2003), commander of the ocean fishing trawler Aurelia of the Bulgarian company Ocean Fisheries – Burgas during its fishing trip to Antarctic waters off South Georgia and the South Orkney Islands from September 1977 to April 1978. The Bulgarian fishermen, along with those of the Soviet Union, Poland and East Germany are the pioneers of modern Antarctic fishing industry.”

== Location ==
Presnakov Island is located at 63°17′46″S 62°16′21″W, which is 330 m west-southeast of Jameson Point and 1.55 km northwest of Ugorelets Point. British mapping in 2009.

== Maps ==
- South Shetland Islands: Smith and Low Islands. Scale 1:150000 topographic map No. 13677. British Antarctic Survey, 2009.
- Antarctic Digital Database (ADD). Scale 1:250000 topographic map of Antarctica. Scientific Committee on Antarctic Research (SCAR). Since 1993, regularly upgraded and updated.
