= Aurelia Island =

Island in Antarctica

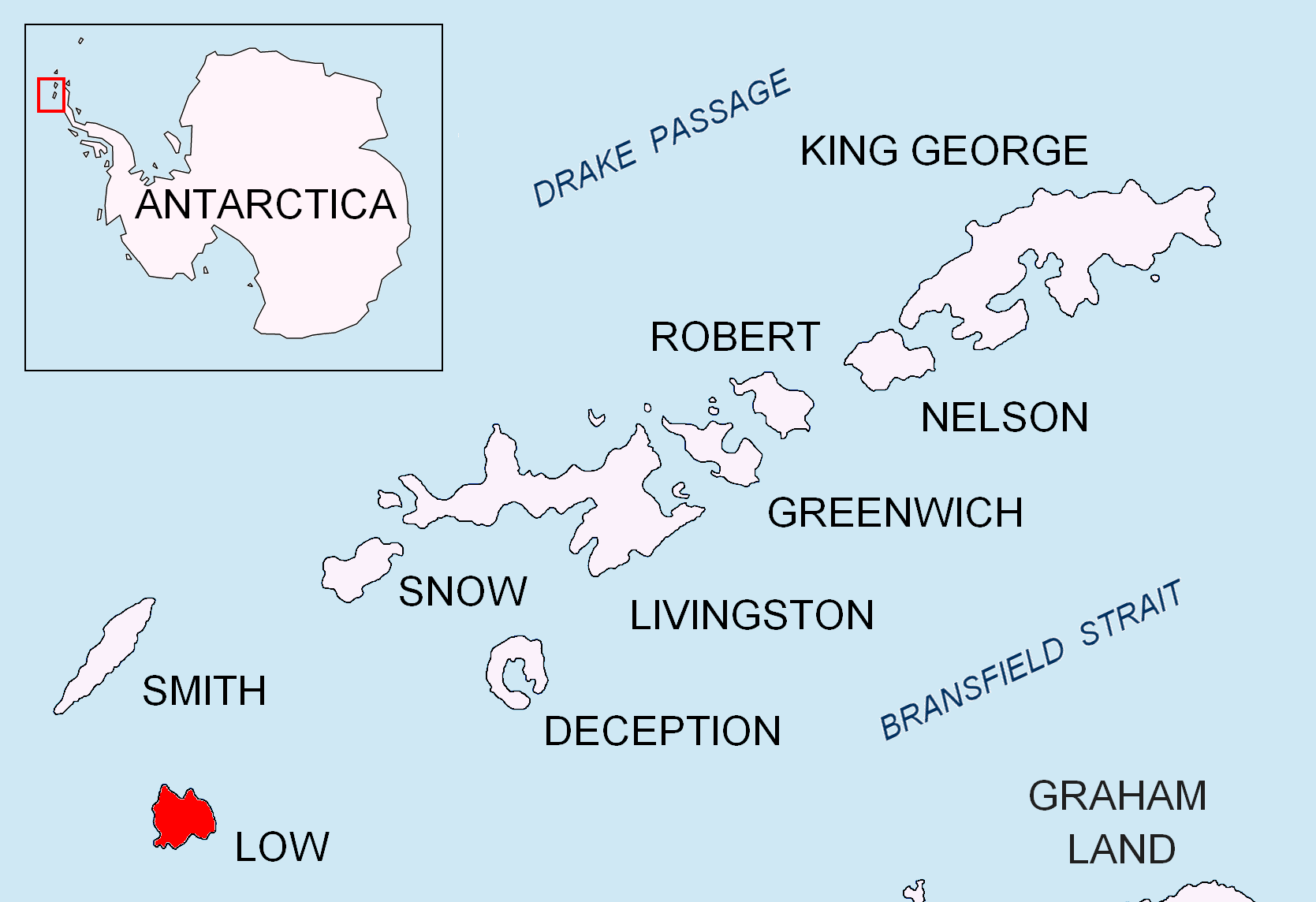
- Location of Low Island in the South Shetland Islands

- Location within Antarctica Location within Antarctic Peninsula

Geography
- Location: Antarctica
- Coordinates: 63°13′49″S 62°12′09″W
- Archipelago: South Shetland Islands
- Length: 300 m (1000 ft)
- Width: 190 m (620 ft)

Administration
- Antarctica
- Administered under the Antarctic Treaty System

Demographics
- Population: uninhabited

Aurelia Island (Bulgarian: остров Аурелия, romanized: ostrov Aurelia, IPA: [ˈɔstrof ɐoˈrɛlijɐ]) is the 390 m long in west–east direction and 190 m wide rocky island lying off Limets Peninsula in northern Low Island in the South Shetland Islands, Antarctica. Its coastline is highly indented.

The island is "named after the ocean fishing trawler Aurelia of the Bulgarian company Ocean Fisheries – Burgas that operated in Antarctic waters off South Georgia and the South Orkney Islands during its fishing trip under Captain Ivan Presnakov from September 1977 to April 1978. The Bulgarian fishermen, along with those of the Soviet Union, Poland and East Germany are the pioneers of modern Antarctic fishing industry."

== Location ==
Aurelia Island is located at 63°13′49″S 62°12′09″W, which is 200 m northeast of Cape Wallace and 1.2 km southwest of Beslen Island. British mapping in 2009.

== Maps ==
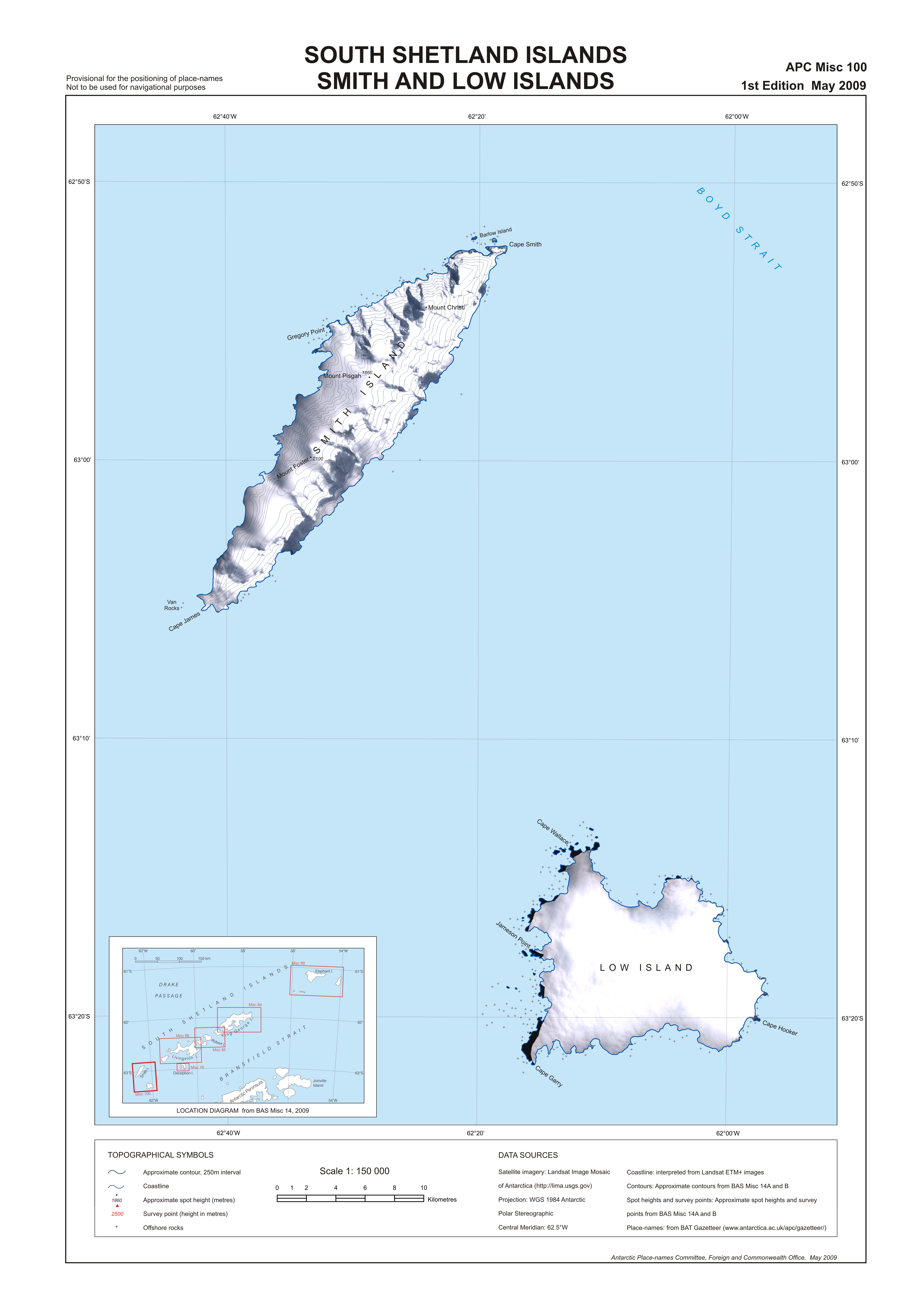
Map of Smith and Low Islands in the South Shetland Islands

- South Shetland Islands: Smith and Low Islands. Scale 1:150000 topographic map No. 13677. British Antarctic Survey, 2009
- Antarctic Digital Database (ADD). Scale 1:250000 topographic map of Antarctica. Scientific Committee on Antarctic Research (SCAR). Since 1993, regularly upgraded and updated
