= Smochevo Cove =

Antarctic Cove

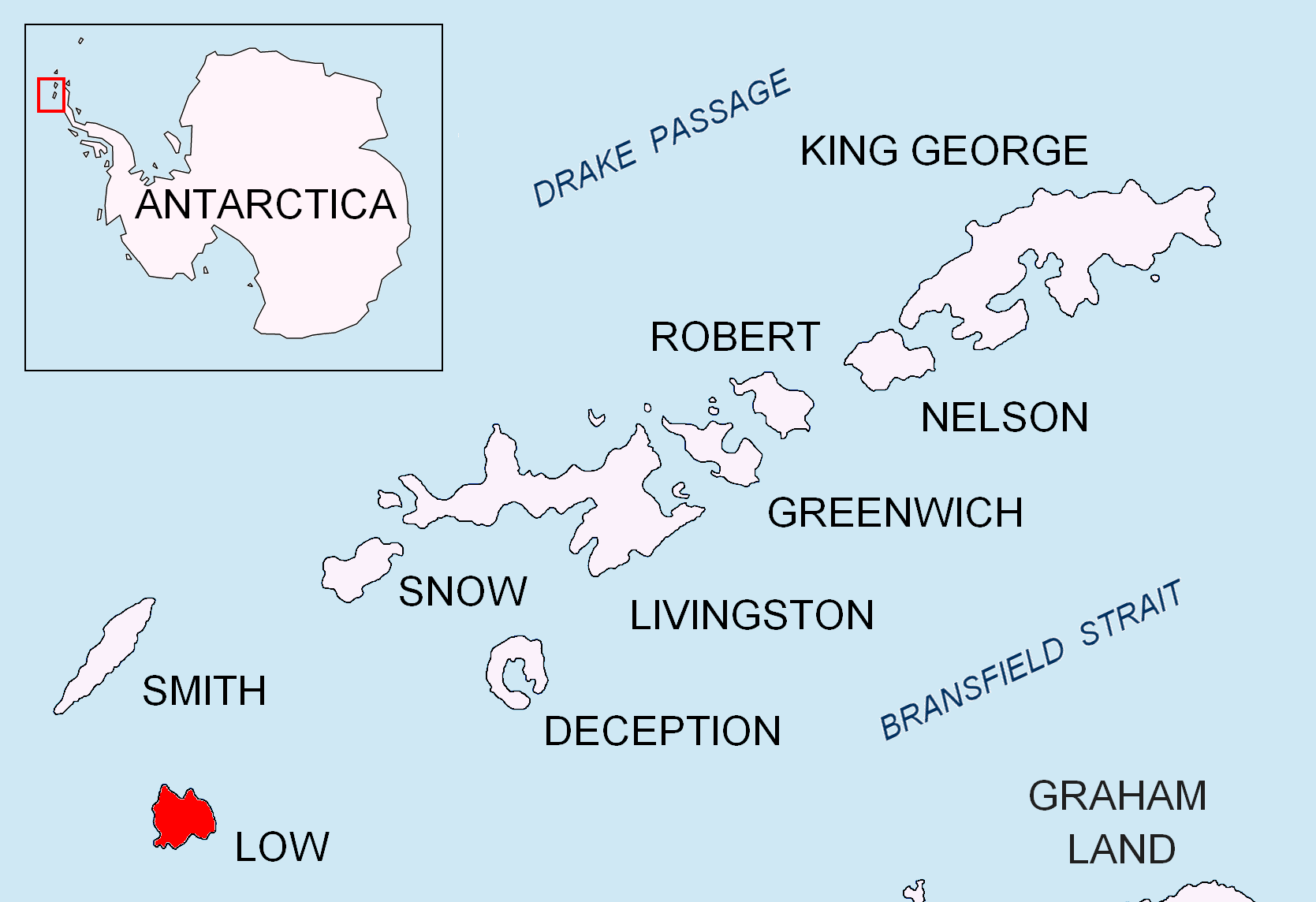
Location of Low Island in the South Shetland Islands.

Smochevo Cove (Bulgarian: залив Смочево, ‘Zaliv Smochevo’ \'za-liv 'smo-che-vo\) is the 1.6 km wide cove on the southeast side of Osmar Strait indenting for 850 m the northwest coast of Low Island in the South Shetland Islands, Antarctica. Entered south of Cape Wallace, Zebil Island and Glumche Island, and north of Fernandez Point.

The cove is named after the settlement of Smochevo in Western Bulgaria.

== Location ==
Smochevo Cove is located at 63°14′22″S 62°13′05″W. British mapping in 2009.

== Maps ==
- South Shetland Islands: Smith and Low Islands. Scale 1:150000 topographic map No. 13677. British Antarctic Survey, 2009.
- Antarctic Digital Database (ADD). Scale 1:250000 topographic map of Antarctica. Scientific Committee on Antarctic Research (SCAR). Since 1993, regularly upgraded and updated.
