= Malina Cove =

Cove in the South Shetland Islands, Antarctica

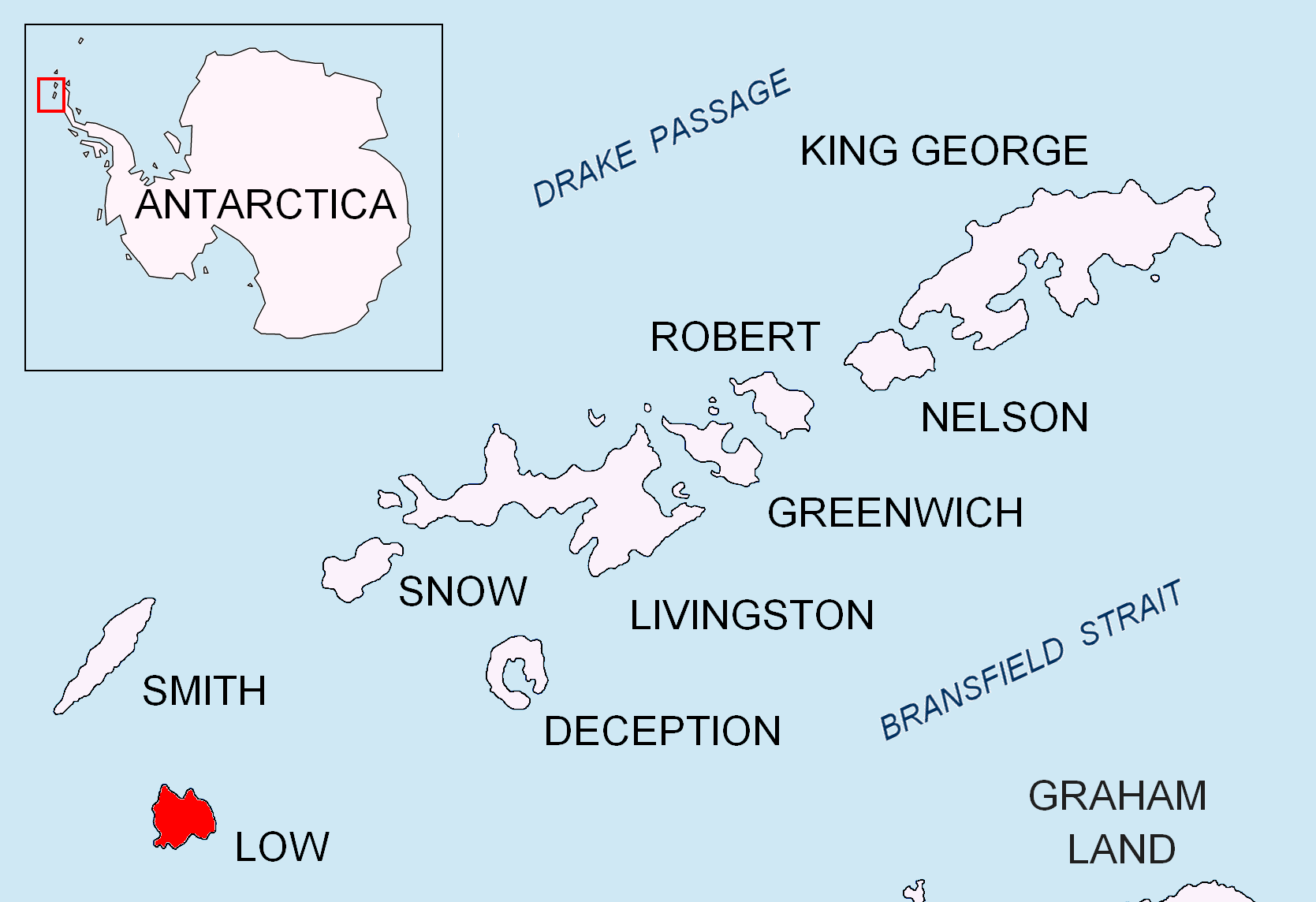
Location of Low Island in the South Shetland Islands.

Malina Cove (Bulgarian: залив Малина, romanized: zaliv Malina, IPA: [ˈzalif ˈmalinɐ]) is the 1.65 km wide cove indenting for 1.25 km the western coast of Low Island in the South Shetland Islands, Antarctica. It is entered south of Jameson Point and north of Ugorelets Point.

The cove is named after the settlements of Gorna (Upper) Malina and Dolna (Lower) Malina in western Bulgaria.

== Location ==
Malina Cove is centred at 63°18′13″S 62°14′35″W, which is south of Teshel Cove, 8.2 km south of Cape Wallace and 6.6 km north of Cape Garry. British mapping in 2009.

== Maps ==
- South Shetland Islands: Smith and Low Islands. Scale 1:150000 topographic map No. 13677. British Antarctic Survey, 2009.
- Antarctic Digital Database (ADD). Scale 1:250000 topographic map of Antarctica. Scientific Committee on Antarctic Research (SCAR), 1993–2016.
