= Solnik Point =

Point in the South Shetland Islands, Antarctica

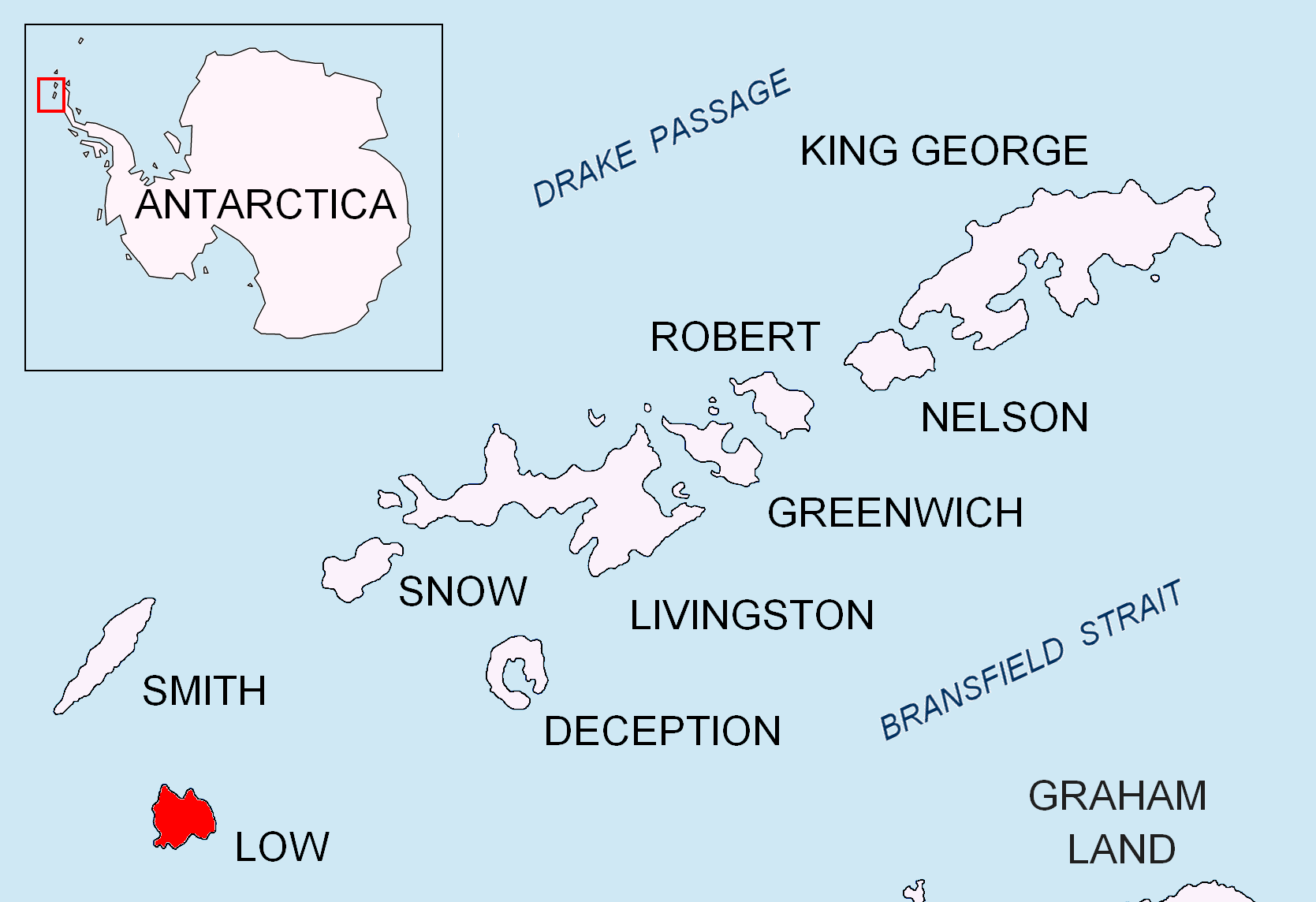
Location of Low Island in the South Shetland Islands.

Solnik Point (Bulgarian: нос Солник, ‘Nos Solnik’ \'nos 'sol-nik\) is a rocky point projecting 550 m from the northwest coast of Low Island in the South Shetland Islands, Antarctica. Forming the south side of the entrance to Kazichene Cove. Situated 4.1 km southwest of Cape Wallace and 11.15 km north of Cape Garry.

The point is named after the settlement of Solnik in northeastern Bulgaria.

== Location ==
Solnik Point is located at 63°15′47″S 62°15′08″W. British mapping in 2009.

== Maps ==
- South Shetland Islands: Smith and Low Islands. Scale 1:150000 topographic map No. 13677. British Antarctic Survey, 2009.
- Antarctic Digital Database (ADD). Scale 1:250000 topographic map of Antarctica. Scientific Committee on Antarctic Research (SCAR), 1993–2016.
