= Divotino Point =

Point in South Shetland Islands, Antarctica

Location of Robert Island in the South Shetland Islands.

Divotino Point (Bulgarian: нос Дивотино, ‘Nos Divotino’ \'nos di-'vo-ti-no\) is a sharp, low ice-free point on the southeast coast of Alfatar Peninsula on Robert Island in the South Shetland Islands, Antarctica projecting 200 m into Mitchell Cove. Situated 2 km northeast of Debelyanov Point and 3.35 km north by west of Negra Point.

The point is named after the settlement of Divotino in western Bulgaria.

== Location ==
Divotino Point is located at 62°22′47″S 59°38′27″W. Bulgarian mapping in 2009.

== Maps ==
- L.L. Ivanov. Antarctica: Livingston Island and Greenwich, Robert, Snow and Smith Islands. Scale 1:120000 topographic map. Troyan: Manfred Wörner Foundation, 2009. ISBN 978-954-92032-6-4
