= Asemus Beach =

Location in Antarctica

Location of Robert Island in the South Shetland Islands.

Topographic map of Livingston Island, Greenwich, Robert, Snow and Smith Islands.

Asemus Beach (Bulgarian: бряг Асемус, romanized: bryag Asemus, IPA: [ˈbrʲak ɐˈsɛmos]) is the beach extending 2.2 km on the northwest side of Mitchell Cove in Robert Island in the South Shetland Islands, Antarctica. It is bounded by Debelyanov Point to the southwest, the undulating interior of Alfatar Peninsula to the northwest and Divotino Point to the northeast, and is snow-free in summer.

The beach is named after the ancient Roman town of Asemus in Northern Bulgaria.

== Location ==
Asemus Beach is located at 62°23′10″S 59°39′25″W. British mapping in 1968, Chilean in 1971, Argentine in 1980, and Bulgarian in 2009.

== Maps ==
- L.L. Ivanov. Antarctica: Livingston Island and Greenwich, Robert, Snow and Smith Islands. Scale 1:120000 topographic map. Troyan: Manfred Wörner Foundation, 2009. ISBN 978-954-92032-6-4 (Updated second edition 2010. ISBN 978-954-92032-9-5)
- Antarctic Digital Database (ADD). Scale 1:250000 topographic map of Antarctica. Scientific Committee on Antarctic Research (SCAR). Since 1993, regularly upgraded and updated.
