= Mateev Point =

Antarctic headland

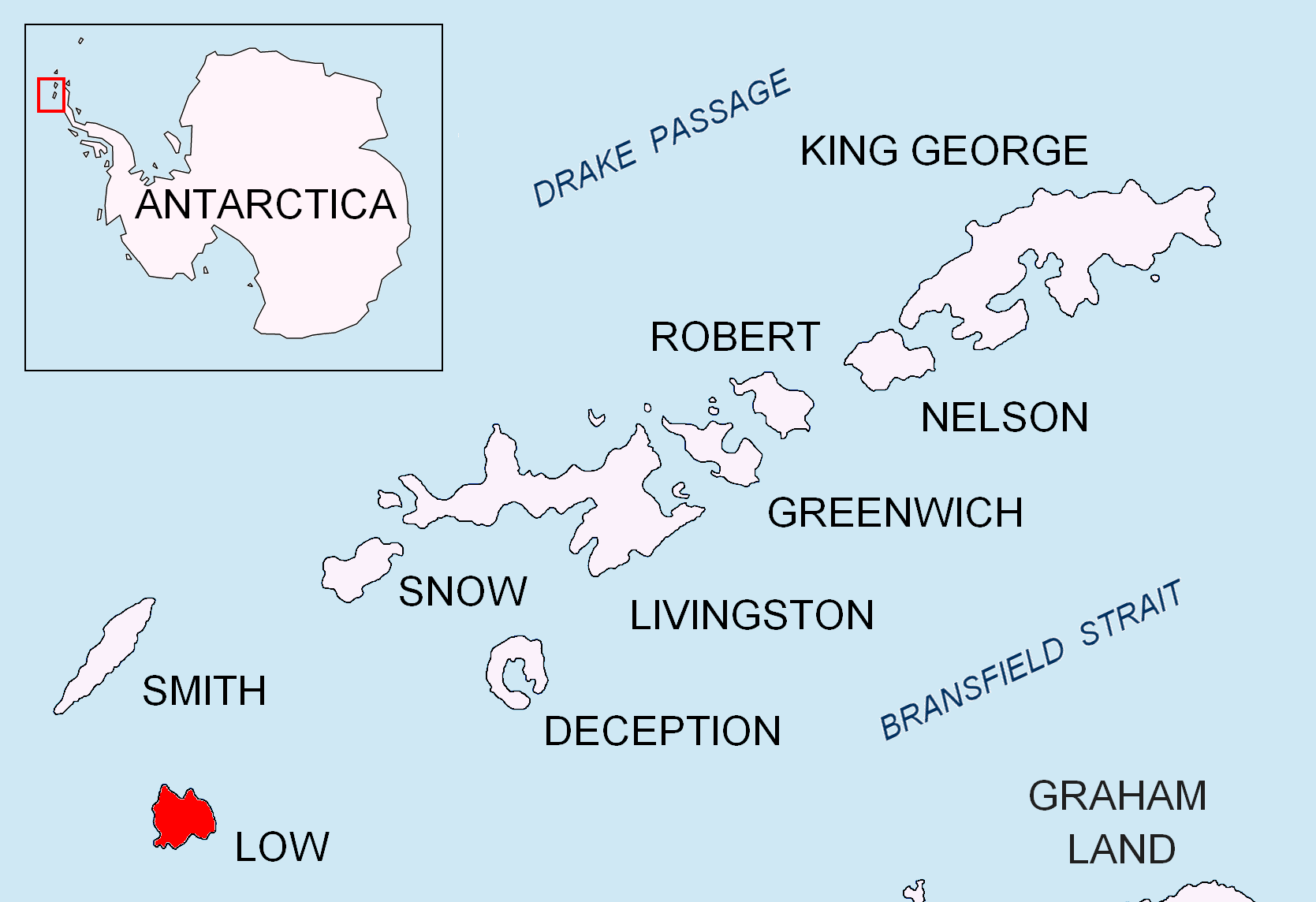
Location of Low Island in the South Shetland Islands

Mateev Point (Bulgarian: Матеев нос, romanized: Mateev nos, IPA: [mɐ'tɛɛf 'nɔs]) is the conspicuous 43 m high rocky point projecting 490 m north-northwestwards into Berraz Bay on the north coast of Low Island in the South Shetland Islands, Antarctica. The area was visited by early 19th century sealers.

The feature is named after Dragomir Mateev, science and logistics coordinator at the Bulgarian Antarctic Institute, participant in the 2008/09 and subsequent Bulgarian Antarctic campaigns, and base commander at St. Kliment Ohridski in the 2011/12, 2018/19 и 2019/20 seasons.

== Location ==
Mateev Point is located at 63°15′52″S 62°07′10.5″W, which is 5.87 km southeast of Cape Wallace and 2.45 km southwest of Venev Point. British mapping in 2009.

== Maps ==
- South Shetland Islands: Smith and Low Islands. Scale 1:150000 topographic map No. 13677. British Antarctic Survey, 2009.
- Antarctic Digital Database (ADD). Scale 1:250000 topographic map of Antarctica. Scientific Committee on Antarctic Research (SCAR). Since 1993, regularly upgraded and updated.
