= Ugorelets Point =

Rocky point on south side of entrance to Malina Cove

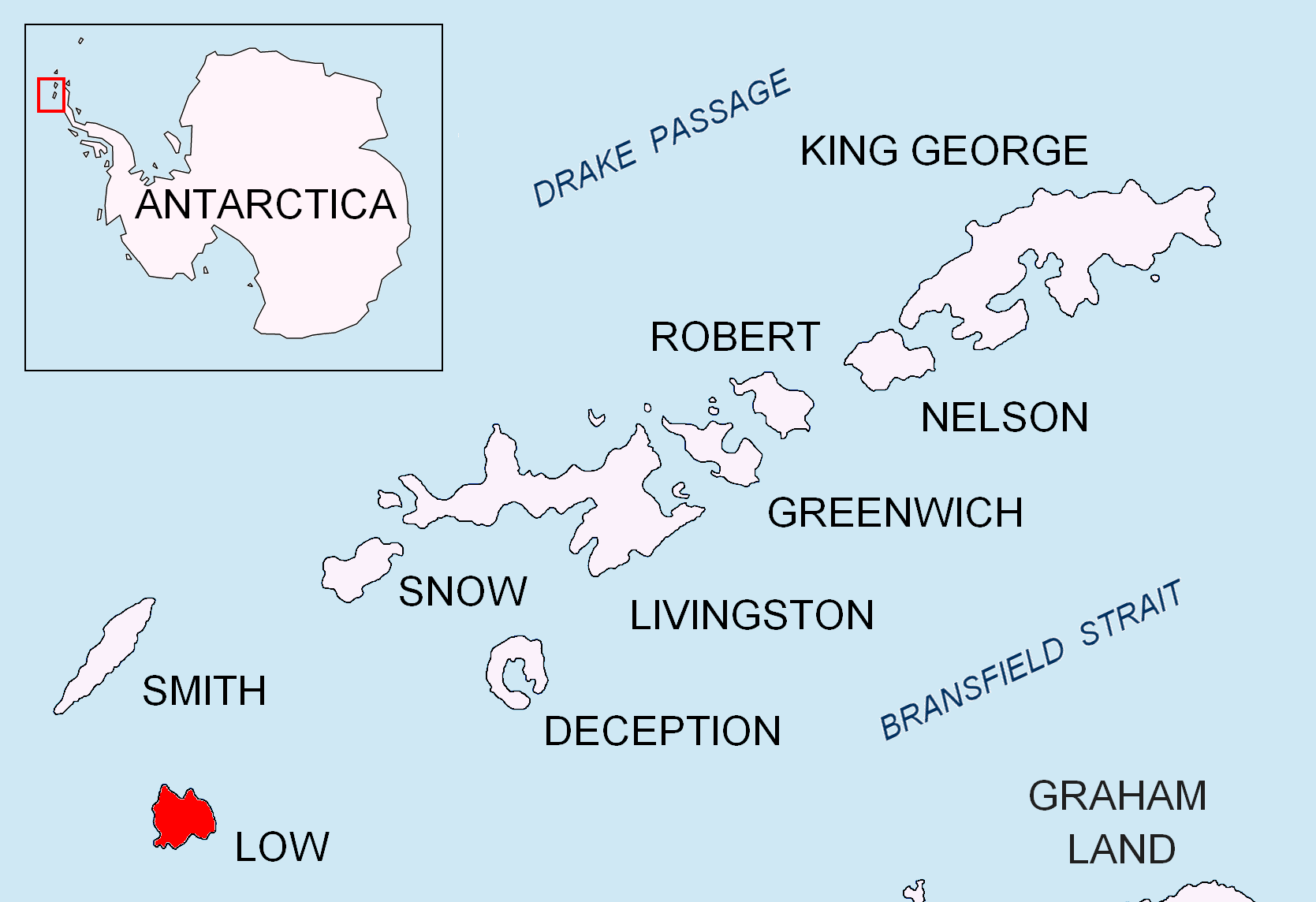
Location of Low Island in the South Shetland Islands.

Ugorelets Point (Bulgarian: нос Угорелец, ‘Nos Ugorelets’ \'nos u-go-'re-lets\) is the rocky point on the south side of the entrance to Malina Cove on the west coast of Low Island in the South Shetland Islands, Antarctica.

The point is named after the settlement of Ugorelets in Northern Bulgaria.

== Location ==
Ugorelets Point is located at 63°18′31.5″S 62°15′03.5″W, which is 8.9 km south-southwest of Cape Wallace and 6.04 km north of Cape Garry. British mapping in 2009.

== Maps ==
- South Shetland Islands: Smith and Low Islands. Scale 1:150000 topographic map No. 13677. British Antarctic Survey, 2009.
- Antarctic Digital Database (ADD). Scale 1:250000 topographic map of Antarctica. Scientific Committee on Antarctic Research (SCAR). Since 1993, regularly upgraded and updated.
