= Limets Peninsula =

Peninsula in the South Shetland Islands

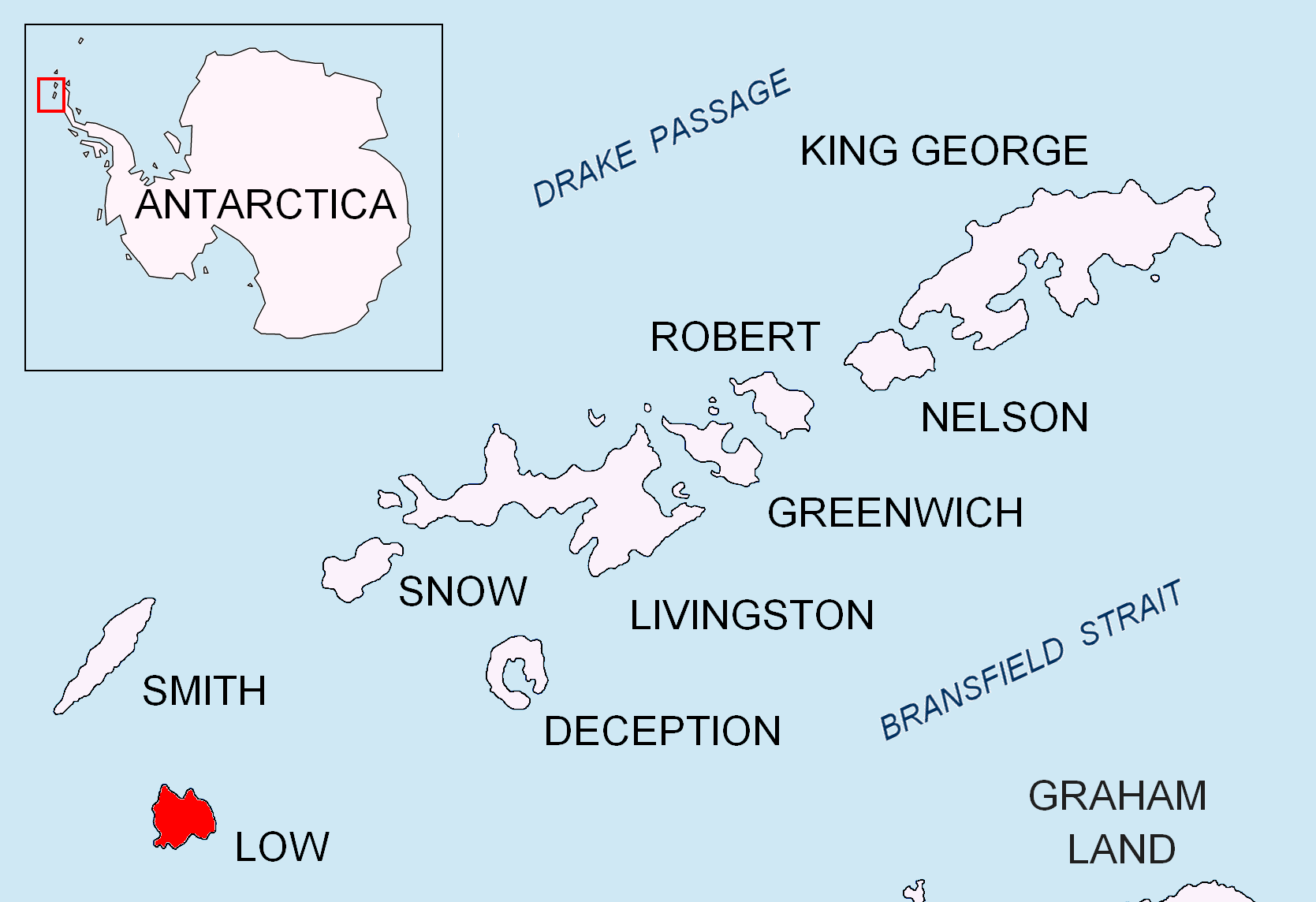
Location of Low Island in the South Shetland Islands

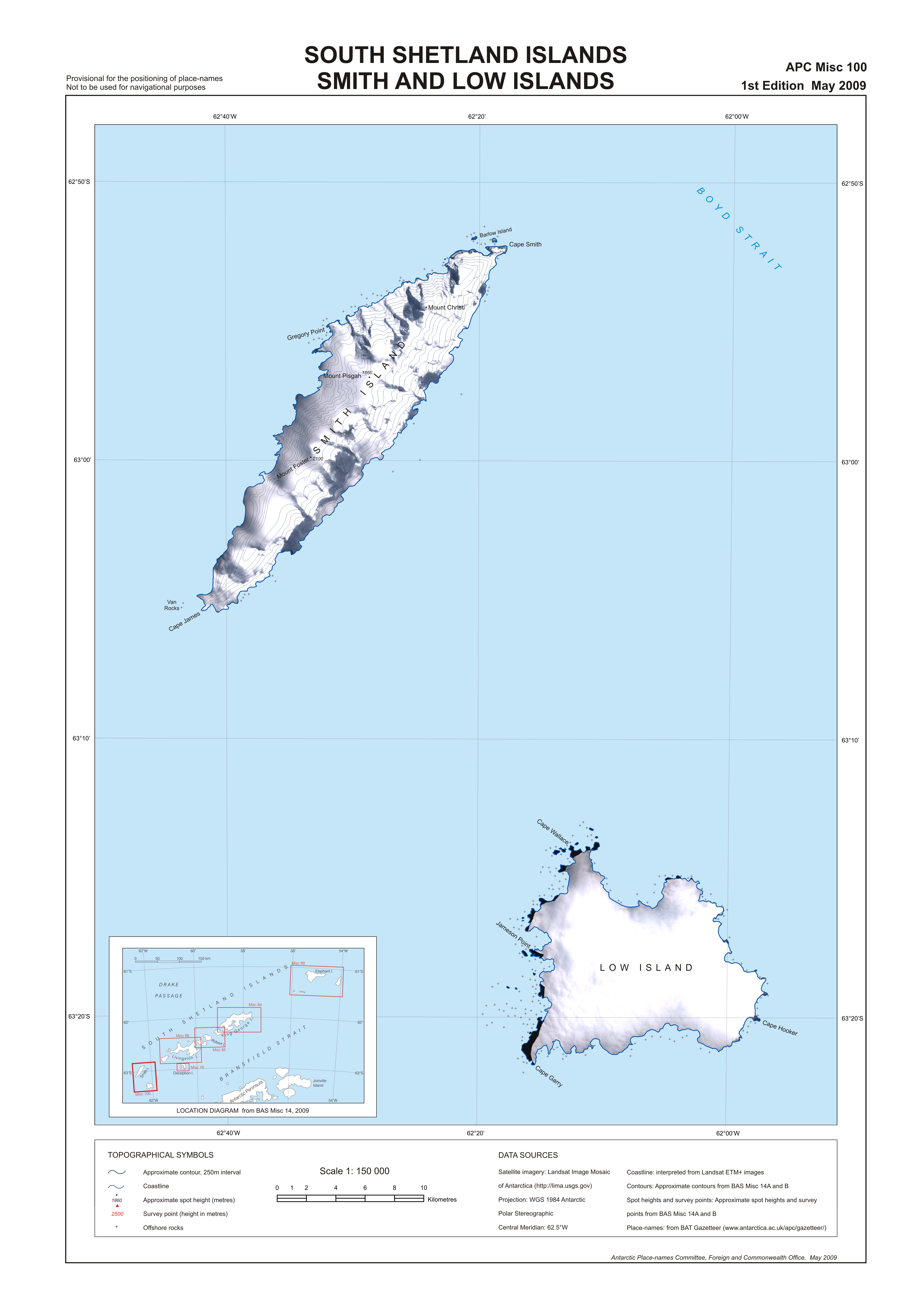
Map of Smith and Low Islands in the South Shetland Islands

Limets Peninsula (Bulgarian: полуостров Лимец, romanized: poluostrov Limets, IPA: [poɫuˈɔstrof liˈmɛt͡s]) is the predominantly ice-free peninsula forming the northwest extremity of Low Island in the South Shetland Islands. The feature is projecting 3.3 km northwards and 2.4 km wide. It is bounded by Kazichene Cove and Smochevo Cove to the west and Berraz Bay to the east, and ends in Cape Wallace to the north. The area was visited by early 19th century sealers.

== Name ==
The feature is named after the settlement of Limets in Southern Bulgaria.

== Location ==
Limets Peninsula is centred at 63°14′50″S 62°11′40″W. British mapping in 1968 and 2009.

== Maps ==
- South Shetland Islands: Smith and Low Islands. Scale 1:150000 topographic map No. 13677. British Antarctic Survey, 2009
- Antarctic Digital Database (ADD). Scale 1:250000 topographic map of Antarctica. Scientific Committee on Antarctic Research (SCAR). Since 1993, regularly upgraded and updated
