= Jameson Point =

Headland of Antarctica

Coordinates: 63°17′40″S 62°15′44″W

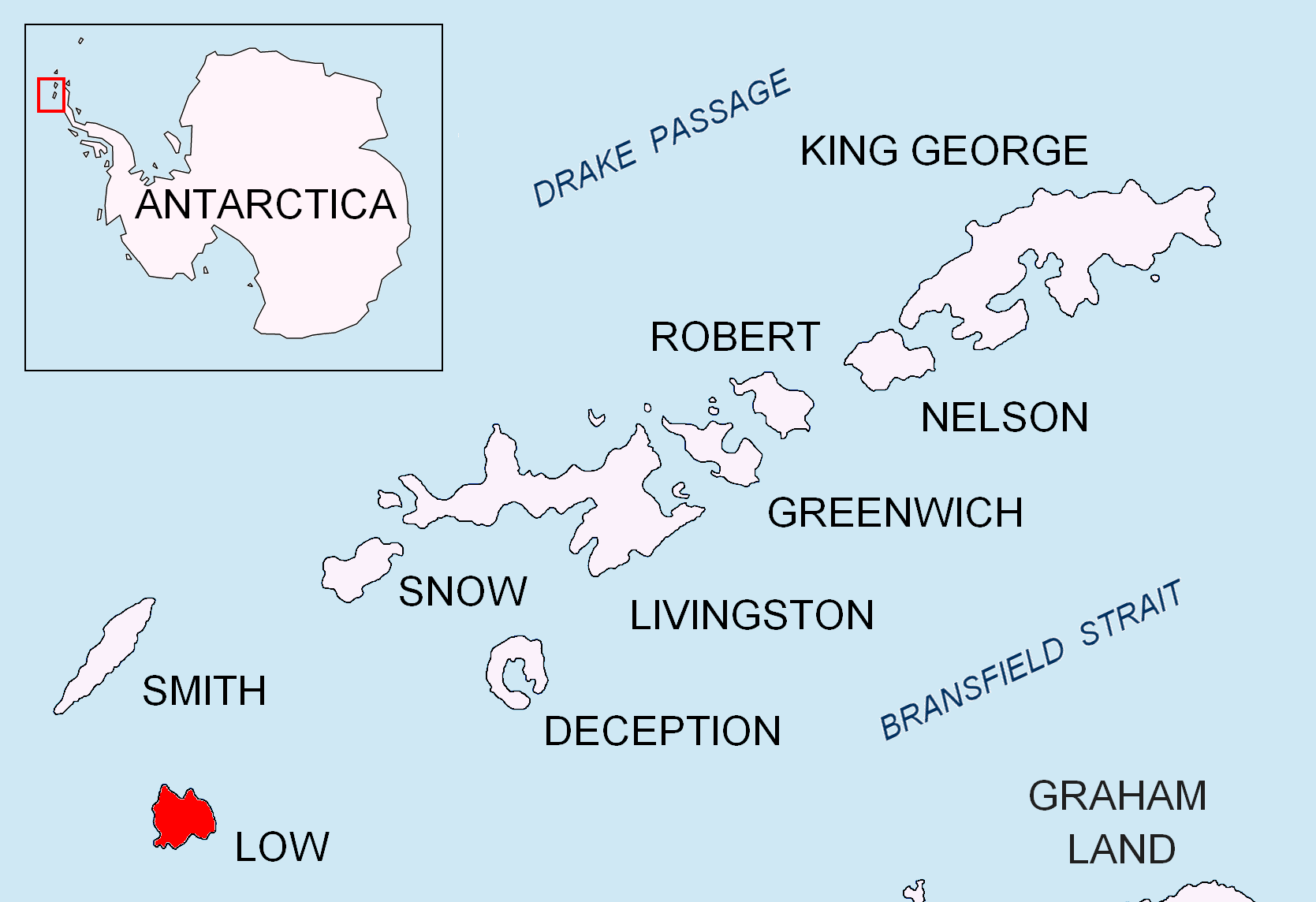
Location of Low Island in the South Shetland Islands

Jameson Point is a small headland on the north side of the entrance to Malina Cove, situated 6.3 km (3.9 mi) north of Cape Garry on the west side of Low Island, in the South Shetland Islands of Antarctica. It was roughly charted by the French Antarctic Expedition, 1908–10. The point was photographed from the air by the Falkland Islands and Dependencies Aerial Survey Expedition, 1955–57, and more accurately delineated from these photos by the Falkland Islands Dependencies Survey in 1959. The name "Jameson Island" was applied to Low Island by James Weddell in 1820–23, and Jameson Point has been approved for this point to preserve Weddell's name on Low Island.

== Important Bird Area ==
The headland has been identified as an Important Bird Area (IBA) by BirdLife International because it supports a large breeding colony of chinstrap penguins, with about 25,000 pairs recorded there in 1993. The adjacent marine area is part of ASPA 152 – Western Bransfield Strait.
