= Glumche Island =

Antarctic island

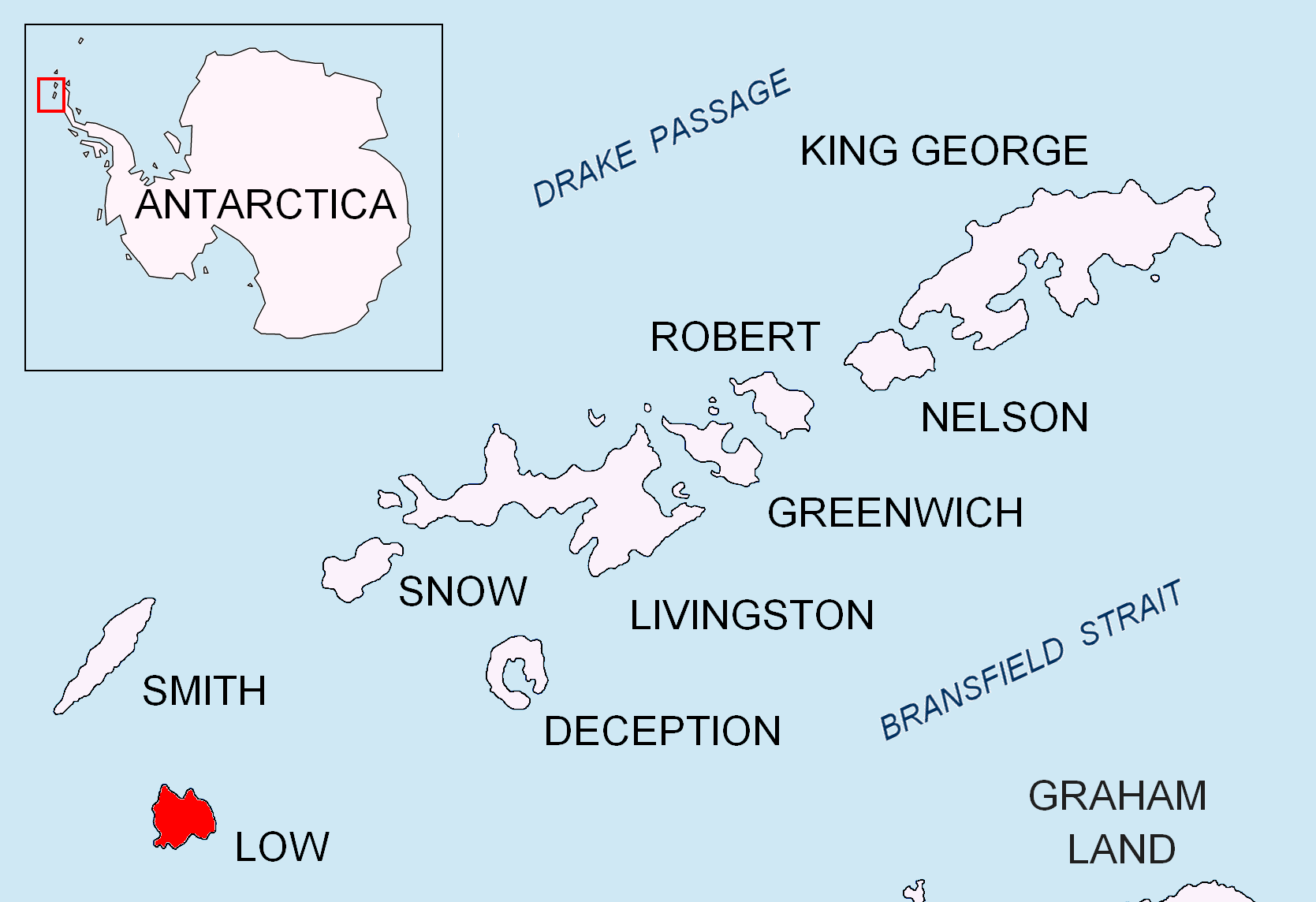
- Location of Low Island in the South Shetland Islands

- Location within Antarctica Location within Antarctic Peninsula

Geography
- Location: Antarctica
- Coordinates: 63°14′07″S 62°13′45″W
- Archipelago: South Shetland Islands

Administration
- Administered under the Antarctic Treaty System

Demographics
- Population: Uninhabited

Glumche Island (Bulgarian: остров Глумче, romanized: ostrov Glumche, IPA: [ˈɔstrov ˈɡɫumt͡ʃɛ]) is the rocky island off the northwest coast of Low Island in the South Shetland Islands extending 470 m in east–west direction and 290 m wide.

The feature is named after the settlement of Glumche in Southeastern Bulgaria.

== Location ==
Glumche Island is located 830 m west-southwest of Cape Wallace and 1.08 km north of Fernandez Point. British mapping in 2009.

== Maps ==
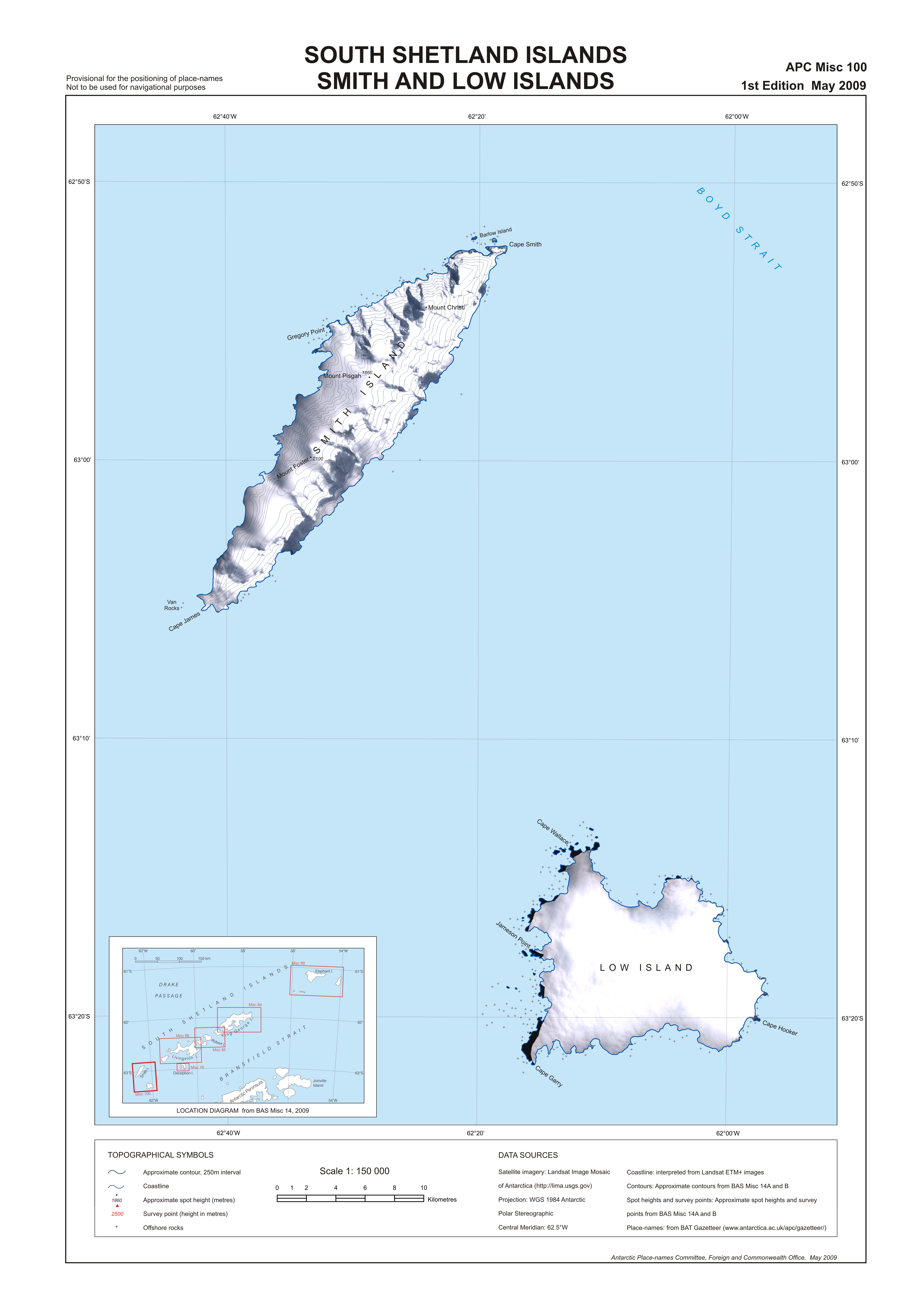
Map of Smith and Low Islands in the South Shetland Islands

- South Shetland Islands: Smith and Low Islands. Scale 1:150000 topographic map No. 13677. British Antarctic Survey, 2009
- Antarctic Digital Database (ADD). Scale 1:250000 topographic map of Antarctica. Scientific Committee on Antarctic Research (SCAR). Since 1993, regularly upgraded and updated
