= Lyutibrod Rocks =

Rocks in Antarctica

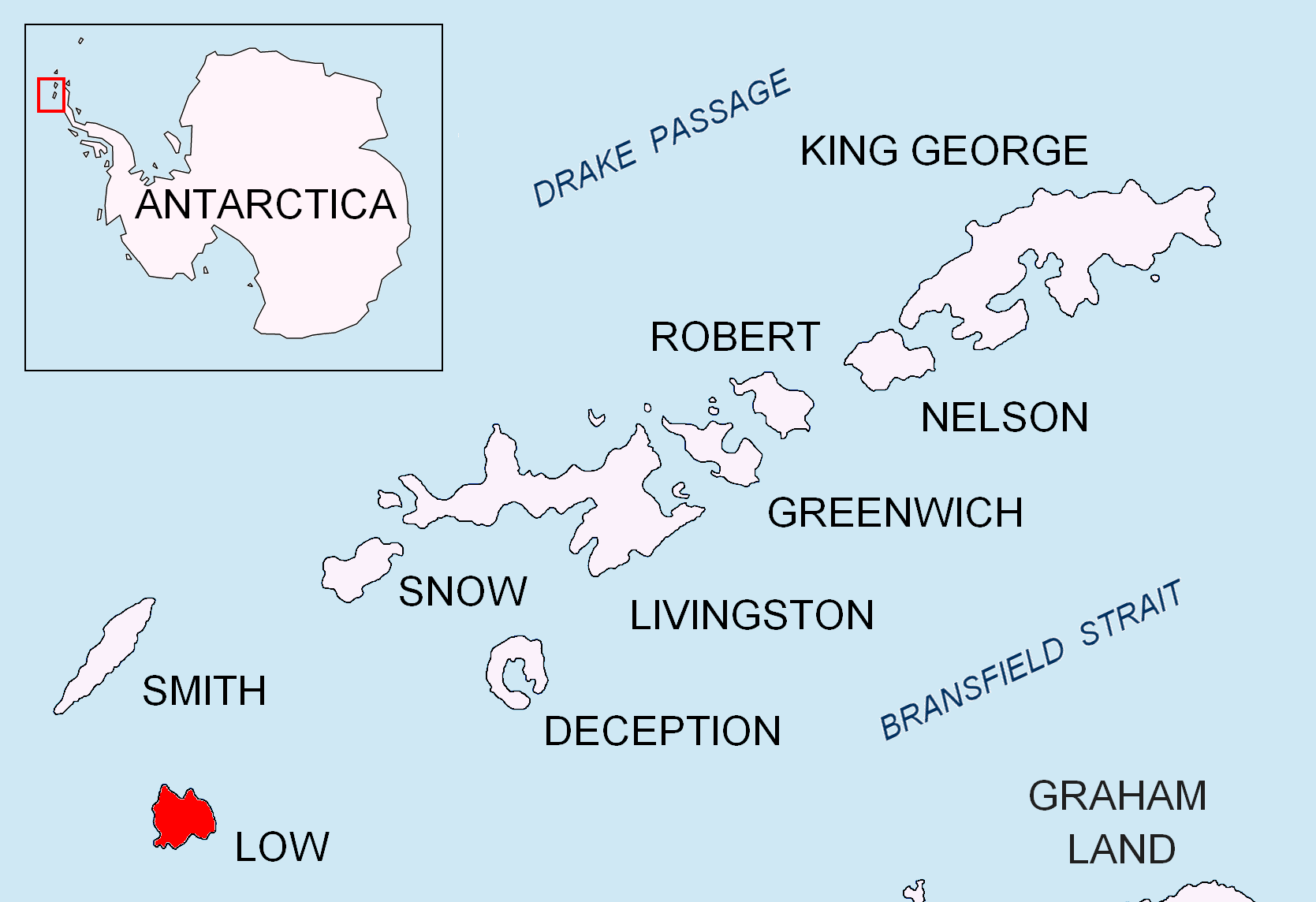
- Location of Low Island in the South Shetland Islands

- Location within Antarctica Location within Antarctic Peninsula

Geography
- Location: Antarctica
- Coordinates: 63°14′48″S 62°14′14″W
- Archipelago: South Shetland Islands

Administration
- Administered under the Antarctic Treaty System

Demographics
- Population: Uninhabited

Lyutibrod Rocks (Bulgarian: Лютибродски скали, ‘Lyutibrodski Skali’ \'lyu-ti-brod-ski ska-'li\) is the chain of rocks off the northwest coast of Low Island in the South Shetland Islands extending 860 m in east-west direction.

The feature is named after the settlement of Lyutibrod in northwestern Bulgaria.

== Location ==
The central and largest of Lyutibrod Rocks is located at 63°14′48″S 62°14′14″W, which is 400 m west of Fernandez Point and 1.95 km north-northeast of Solnik Point.

== See also ==
- List of Antarctic and subantarctic islands

== Maps ==
- South Shetland Islands: Smith and Low Islands. Scale 1:150000 topographic map No. 13677. British Antarctic Survey, 2009.
- Antarctic Digital Database (ADD). Scale 1:250000 topographic map of Antarctica. Scientific Committee on Antarctic Research (SCAR). Since 1993, regularly upgraded and updated.
