= Brocks Peak =

Sharp rocky peak in Ellsworth Mountains, Antarctica

Location of Sentinel Range in Western Antarctica.

Map of northern Sentinel Range.

Brocks Peak (Bulgarian: връх Брокс, romanized: vrah Broks, IPA: [ˈvrɤɣ ˈbrɔks]) is the sharp rocky peak in Ellsworth Mountains, Antarctica rising to 2445 m near the end of the side ridge that trends 6.5 km westwards from Ahrida Peak on the main crest of north-central Sentinel Range. It is named after the Bulgarian mountaineer Helmut Brocks (1895–1969), a pioneer of the organized tourist movement in Bulgaria.

== Location ==
Brocks Peak is located at 78°01′32.7″S 86°18′34″W, which is 4.58 km west of Ahrida Peak, 7.7 km north of Strahil Peak, 5.55 km east of Silyanov Peak, 11.73 km south of Mursalitsa Peak and 10 km southwest of Mount Dalrymple. US mapping in 1961.

== See also ==
- Mountains in Antarctica

== Maps ==
- Newcomer Glacier. Scale 1:250 000 topographic map. Reston, Virginia: US Geological Survey, 1961.
- Antarctic Digital Database (ADD). Scale 1:250000 topographic map of Antarctica. Scientific Committee on Antarctic Research (SCAR). Since 1993, regularly updated.
