= Venev Point =

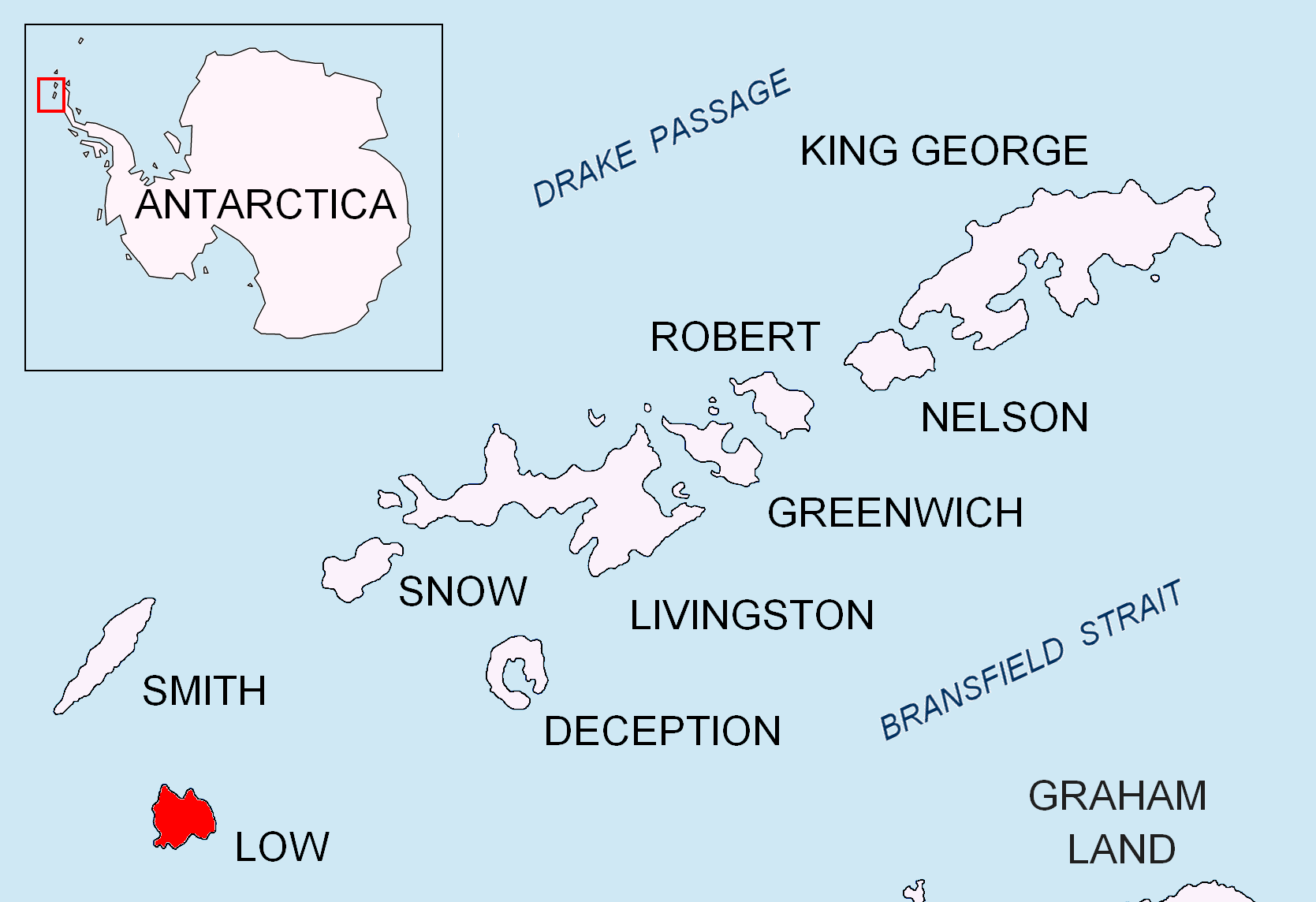
Location of Low Island in the South Shetland Islands

Venev Point (Bulgarian: Венев нос, ‘Venev Nos’ \'ve-nev 'nos\) is the rocky east entrance to Berraz Bay on the north coast of Low Island in the South Shetland Islands, Antarctica.

The feature is named after the Bulgarian artist Stoyan Venev (1904–1989).

== Location ==
Venev Point is located at 63°15′01.4″S 62°04′54.5″W, which is 6.82 km east-southeast of Cape Wallace, 4.15 km northwest of Cape Denax and 2.45 km northeast of Mateev Point. British mapping in 2009.

== Maps ==
- South Shetland Islands: Smith and Low Islands. Scale 1:150000 topographic map No. 13677. British Antarctic Survey, 2009.
- Antarctic Digital Database (ADD). Scale 1:250000 topographic map of Antarctica. Scientific Committee on Antarctic Research (SCAR). Since 1993, regularly upgraded and updated.
