= Glumche =

Glumche Глумче
- Village
- Location within Bulgaria
- Coordinates: 42°42′N 27°01′E
- Country: Bulgaria
- Province: Burgas Province
- Municipality: Karnobat Municipality
- Time zone: UTC+2 (EET)
  - Summer (DST): UTC+3 (EEST)

Glumche is a village in Karnobat Municipality, in Burgas Province, in southeastern Bulgaria.

== Honours ==
Glumche Island in Antarctica is named after the village of Glumche.
