= Kazichene Cove =

Cove in the South Shetland Islands, Antarctica

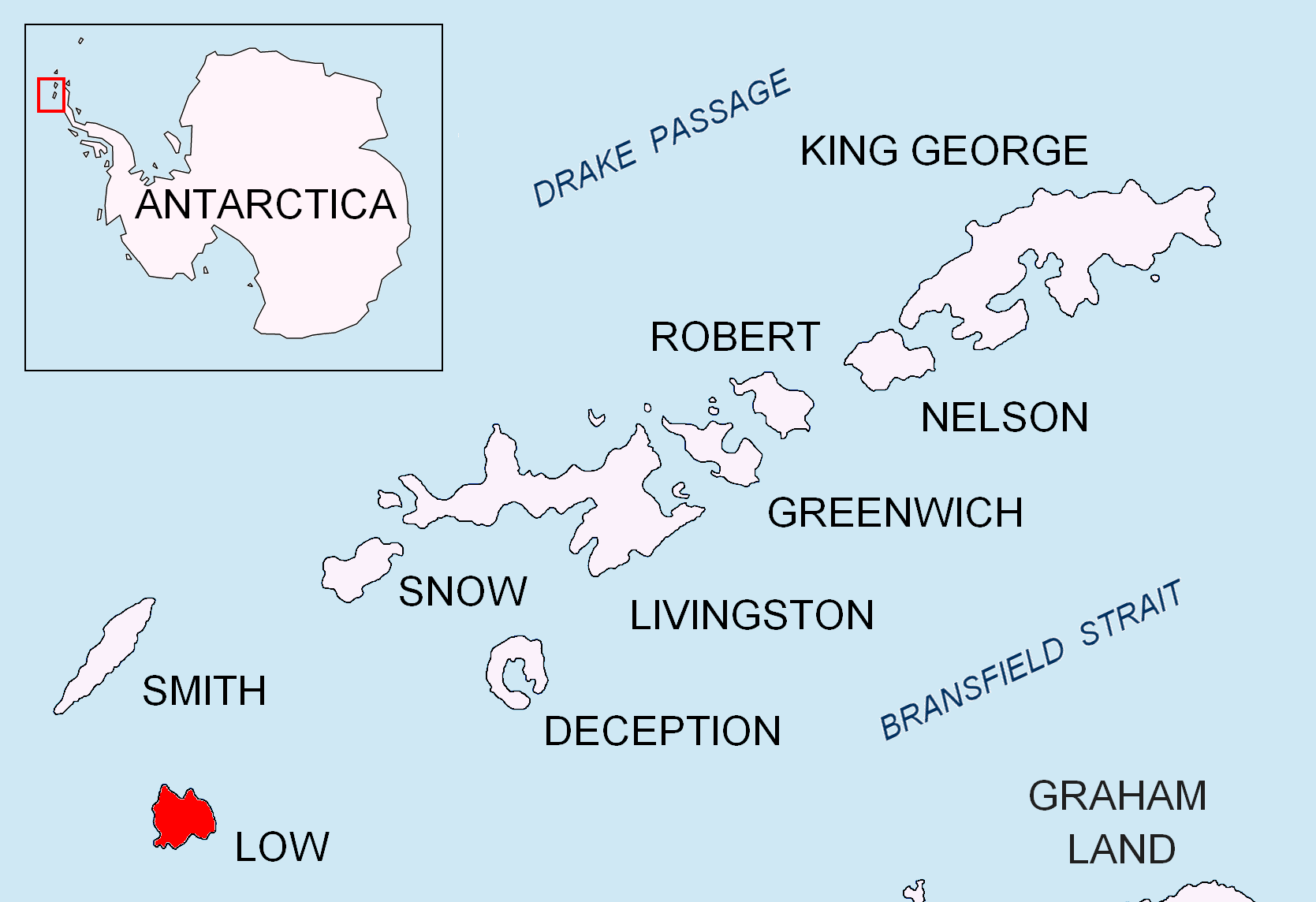
Location of Low Island in the South Shetland Islands.

Kazichene Cove (Bulgarian: залив Казичене, romanized: zaliv Kazichene, IPA: [ˈzalif kɐˈzit͡ʃɛnɛ]) is a 2.2 km wide cove on the southeast side of Osmar Strait indenting for 1.3 km the northwest coast of Low Island in the South Shetland Islands, Antarctica. It is south of Lyutibrod Rocks and Fernandez Point, and north of Solnik Point.

The cove is named after the settlement of Kazichene in western Bulgaria.

== Location ==
Kazichene Cove is centred at 63°15′18″S 62°13′40″W. British mapping in 2009.

== Maps ==
- South Shetland Islands: Smith and Low Islands. Scale 1:150000 topographic map No. 13677. British Antarctic Survey, 2009.
- Antarctic Digital Database (ADD). Scale 1:250000 topographic map of Antarctica. Scientific Committee on Antarctic Research (SCAR). Since 1993, regularly upgraded and updated.
