= Strahil Peak =

Mountain peak

Location of Sentinel Range in Western Antarctica.

Map of Sentinel Range.

Strahil Peak (Bulgarian: връх Страхил, romanized: vrah Strahil, IPA: [ˈvrɤx strɐˈxiɫ]) is the sharp rocky peak rising to 2894 m just west of the main crest of north-central Sentinel Range in Ellsworth Mountains, Antarctica. It is named after the Bulgarian rebel leader Strahil Voyvoda (mid-17th century – c. 1711).

== Location ==
Strahil Peak is located at 78°05′40″S 86°20′01.5″W, which is 2.8 km northwest of Mount Hale, 8.2 km east-northeast of Mount Hubley, 8.63 km southeast of Silyanov Peak and 7.7 km south of Brocks Peak. US mapping in 1961 and 1988.

== Maps ==
- Vinson Massif. Scale 1:250 000 topographic map. Reston, Virginia: US Geological Survey, 1988.
- Antarctic Digital Database (ADD). Scale 1:250000 topographic map of Antarctica. Scientific Committee on Antarctic Research (SCAR). Since 1993, regularly updated.
