= Beslen Island =

Island in the South Shetland Islands

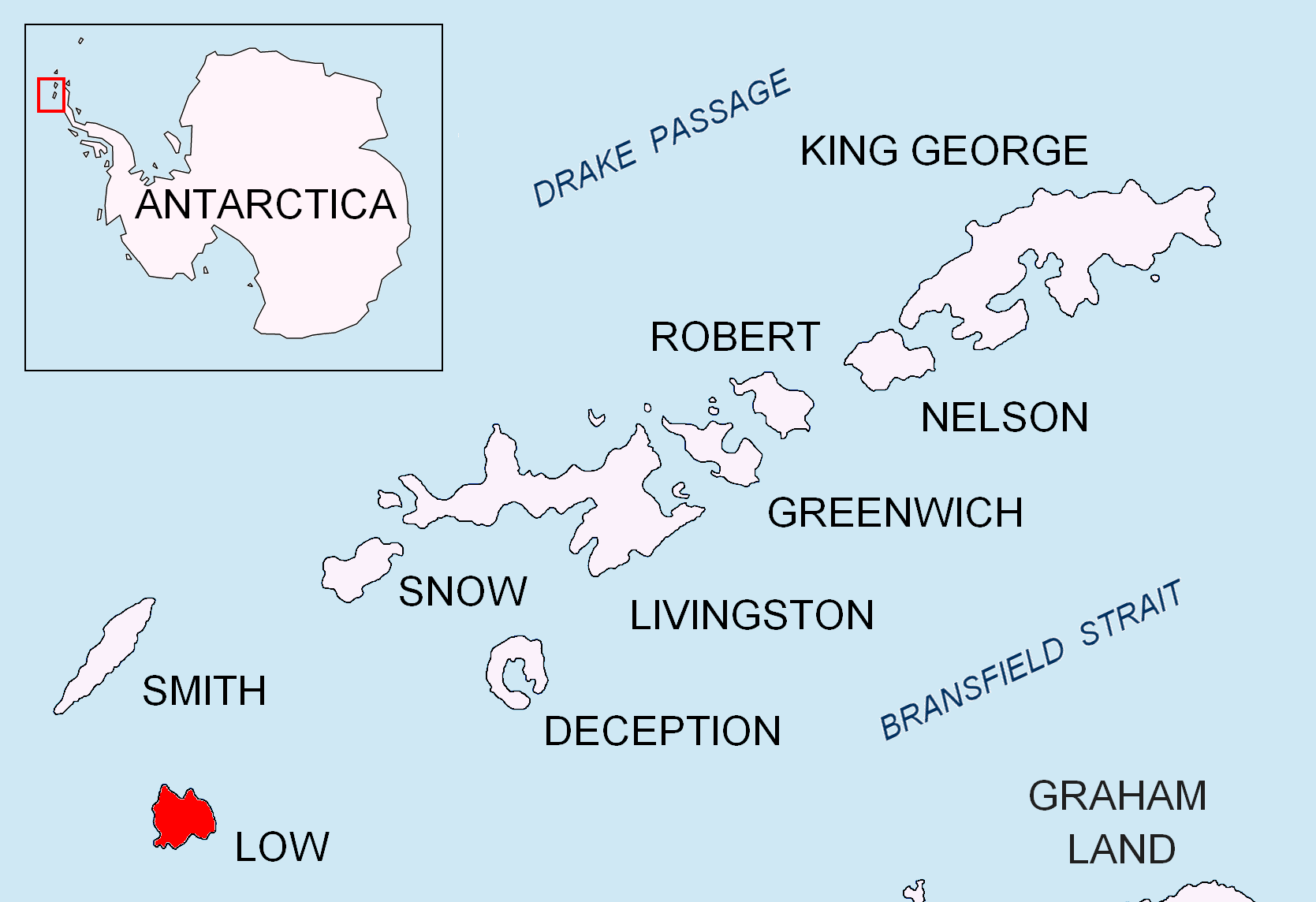
- Location of Low Island in the South Shetland Islands

- Location within Antarctic Peninsula Location within Antarctica

Geography
- Location: Antarctica
- Coordinates: 63°13′18″S 62°10′57″W
- Archipelago: South Shetland Islands

Administration
- Administered under the Antarctic Treaty System

Demographics
- Population: Uninhabited

Beslen Island (Bulgarian: остров Беслен, romanized: ostrov Beslen, IPA: [ˈɔstrov ˈbɛslɛn]) is the rocky island off the northwest extremity of Low Island in the South Shetland Islands extending 240 m in east-west direction and 90 m wide.

The feature is named after the settlement of Beslen in Southwestern Bulgaria.

== Location ==
Beslen Island is located at 63°13′18″S 62°10′57″W, which is 1.67 km northeast of Cape Wallace and 840 m north of Prisad Island. British mapping in 2009.

== Maps ==
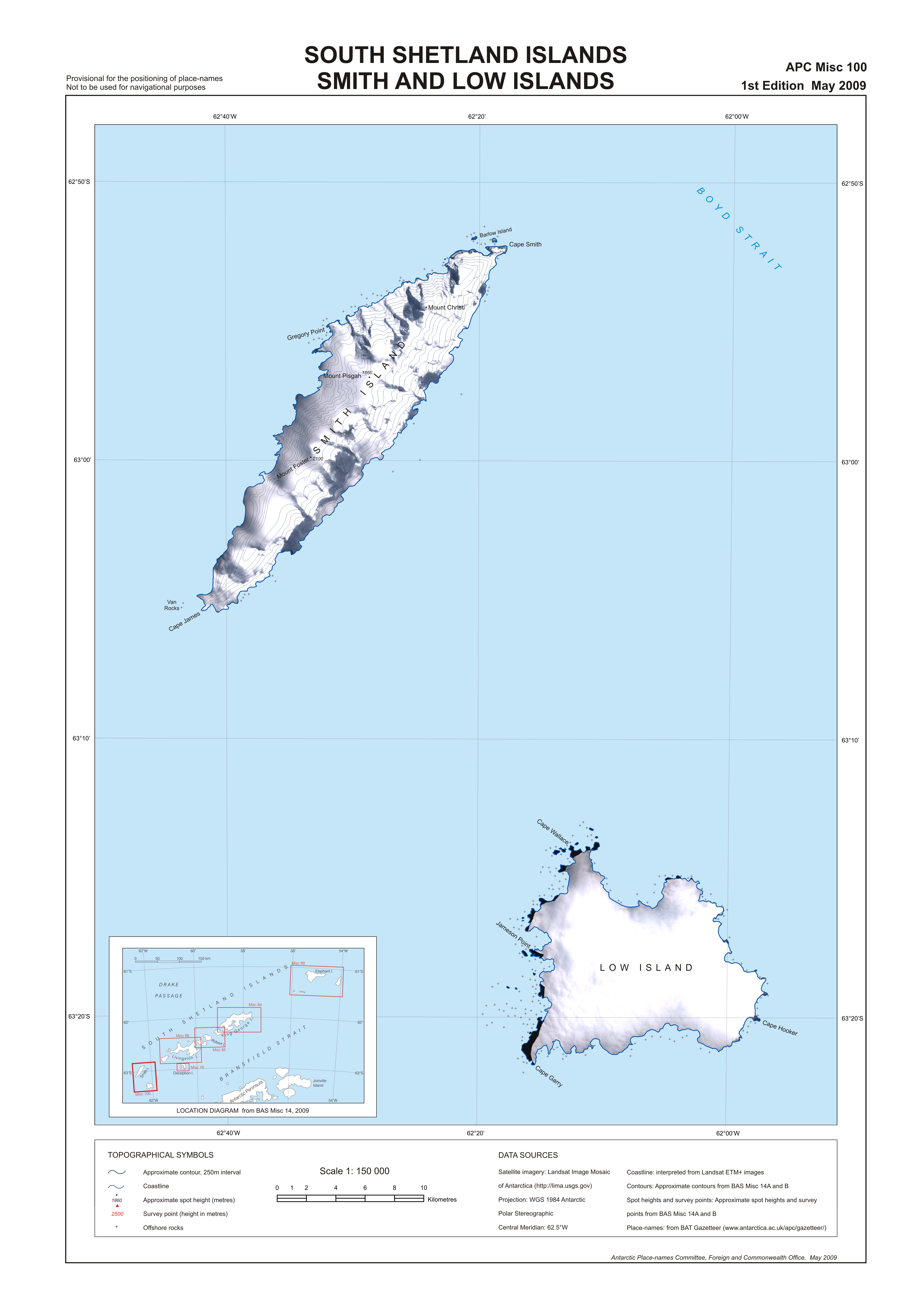
Map of Smith and Low Islands in the South Shetland Islands

- South Shetland Islands: Smith and Low Islands. Scale 1:150000 topographic map No. 13677. British Antarctic Survey, 2009
- Antarctic Digital Database (ADD). Scale 1:250000 topographic map of Antarctica. Scientific Committee on Antarctic Research (SCAR). Since 1993, regularly upgraded and updated
