= Lyutibrod =

Lyutibrod Лютиброд
- Village
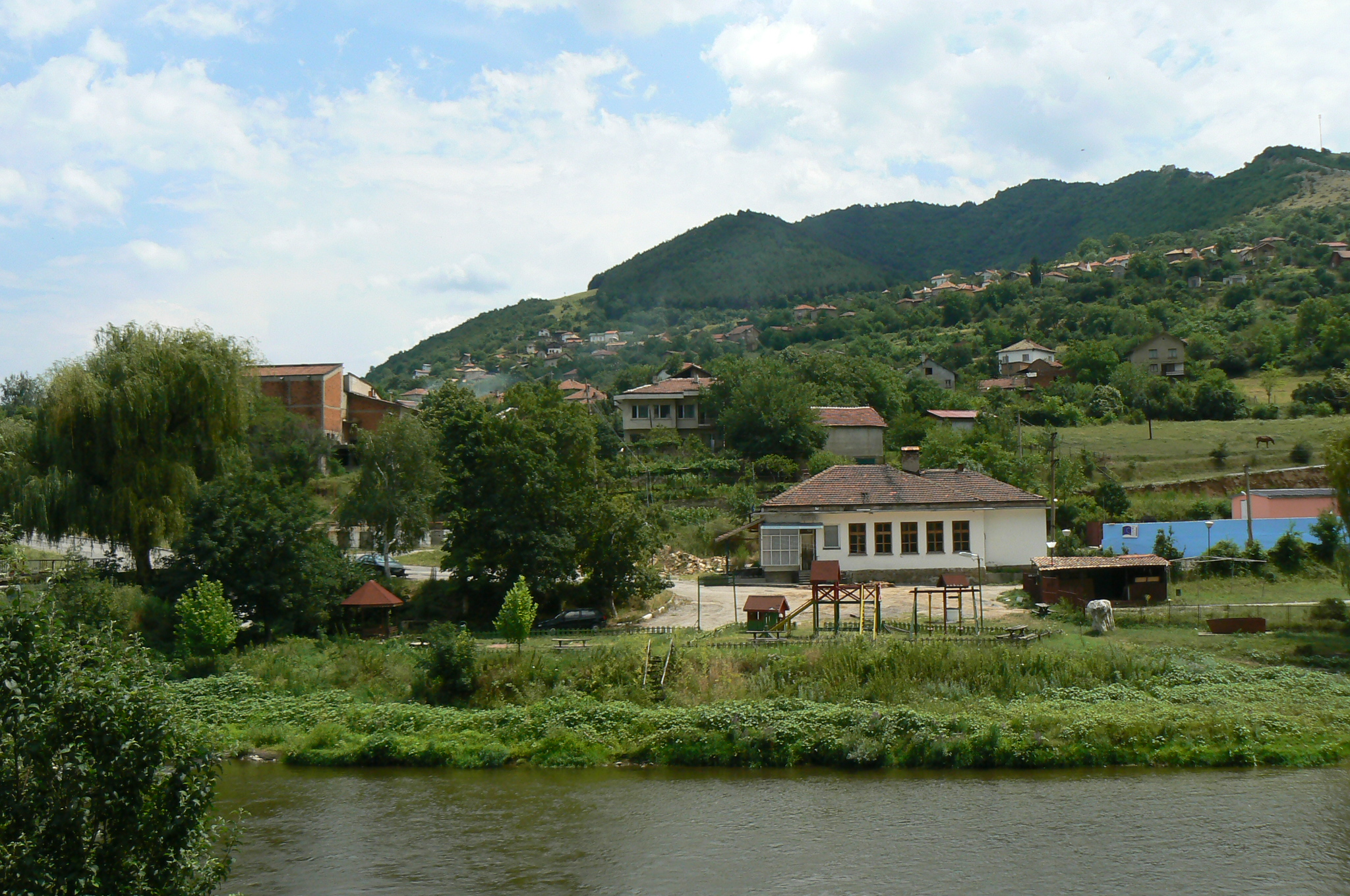
- Lyutibrod with the Iskar river.

- Location of Lyutibrod
- Coordinates: 43°06′20″N 23°37′45″E
- Country: Bulgaria
- Provinces (Oblast): Vratsa Province

Government
  - Mayor: Ivan Kotsev (Ind.)

Area
  - Total: 25.458 km^{2} (9.829 sq mi)
- Elevation: 215 m (705 ft)

Population (2007-01-01)
  - Total: 452
  - Density: 17.8/km^{2} (46.0/sq mi)
- Time zone: UTC+2 (EET)
  - Summer (DST): UTC+3 (EEST)
- Postal Code: 3159

Lyutibrod (Bulgarian: Лютиброд) is a village in Mezdra Municipality in Vratsa Province, western Bulgaria. As of 2007 it has a population of 452. The village is situated in the northern end of the Iskar Gorge, on the right bank of the river of the same name. On the opposite bank of the river are the Ritlite rock formation and the Cherepish Monastery is located at several kilometers to the south. The former settlement Korites, abandoned in the 15th century, contain the ruins of four medieval churches, including a 5th-century basilica.

== Honours ==
Lyutibrod Rocks in Antarctica are named after Lyutibrod.
