= Negra Point =

Point in the South Shetland Islands, Antarctica

Location of Robert Island in the South Shetland Islands.

Topographic map of Livingston Island, Greenwich, Robert, Snow and Smith Islands.

Negra Point is the ice-free tipped point on the southwest coast of Robert Island in the South Shetland Islands, Antarctica forming the southeast side of the entrance to Mitchell Cove. The area was visited by early 19th century seal hunters.

The feature was named descriptively by one of the Chilean Antarctic expeditions.

== Location ==
The point is located at 62°24′34″S 59°37′34″W which is 6.43 km northeast of Spark Point, Greenwich Island, 2.8 km southeast of Debelyanov Point, 4.5 km northwest of Beron Point and 8.84 km northwest of Edwards Point (Chilean mapping in 1975, British mapping in 1968, and Bulgarian in 2005 and 2009).

== See also ==
- Robert Island
- South Shetland Islands

== Maps ==
- L.L. Ivanov et al. Antarctica: Livingston Island and Greenwich Island, South Shetland Islands. Scale 1:100000 topographic map. Sofia: Antarctic Place-names Commission of Bulgaria, 2005.
- L.L. Ivanov. Antarctica: Livingston Island and Greenwich, Robert, Snow and Smith Islands. Scale 1:120000 topographic map. Troyan: Manfred Wörner Foundation, 2009. ISBN 978-954-92032-6-4
