= Afala Island =

Island in the South Shetlands Islands, Antarctica

- Location of Nelson Island in the South Shetland Islands

- Location of in the Antarctic Peninsula Location in Antarctica

Geography
- Location: Antarctica
- Coordinates: 62°14′50″S 59°07′41″W
- Archipelago: South Shetland Islands
- Length: 360 m (1180 ft)
- Width: 310 m (1020 ft)

Administration
- Antarctica
- Administered under the Antarctic Treaty System

Demographics
- Population: uninhabited

Afala Island (Bulgarian: остров Афала, romanized: ostrov Afala, IPA: [ˈɔstrof ɐˈfaɫɐ]) is the rocky island off the north coast of Nelson Island in the South Shetland Islands, Antarctica extending 360 m in west-southwest to east-northeast direction and 310 m in south–north direction.

The island is "named after the ocean fishing trawler Afala of the Bulgarian company Ocean Fisheries – Burgas that operated in Antarctic waters off South Georgia during its fishing trip under Captain Kosyo Kostov in the 1985/86 season. The Bulgarian fishermen, along with those of the Soviet Union, Poland and East Germany are the pioneers of modern Antarctic fishing industry."

== Location ==
Afala Island is located at 62°14′50″S 59°07′41″W, which is 740 m west of Baklan Point, 860 m northeast of Retamales Point and 1.05 km south-southeast of Withem Island. British mapping in 1968.

== Maps ==
- South Shetland Islands. Scale 1:200000 topographic map No. 3373. DOS 610 - W 62 58. Tolworth, UK, 1968.
- Antarctic Digital Database (ADD). Scale 1:250000 topographic map of Antarctica. Scientific Committee on Antarctic Research (SCAR). Since 1993, regularly upgraded and updated.
