= Mitchell Cove =

Location of Robert Island in the South Shetland Islands.

Topographic map of Livingston Island, Greenwich, Robert, Snow and Smith Islands.

Mitchell Cove is the 2.8 km wide bay indenting for 3 km the southwest coast of Robert Island in the South Shetland Islands, Antarctica southeast of Alfatar Peninsula, and entered between Debelyanov Point and Negra Point. The area was visited by early 19th century sealers.

The feature is named after James Mitchell, co-owner of the British cutter Beaufoy under Captain James Weddell that visited the South Shetlands in 1823–24.

== Location ==
The cove's midpoint is located at 62°23′22″S 59°37′48″W (US mapping in 1821, British mapping in 1822 and 1968, Chilean in 1971, Argentine in 1980, and Bulgarian in 2009).

== See also ==
- Robert Island
- South Shetland Islands

== Map ==
- L.L. Ivanov. Antarctica: Livingston Island and Greenwich, Robert, Snow and Smith Islands. Scale 1:120000 topographic map. Troyan: Manfred Wörner Foundation, 2009. ISBN 978-954-92032-6-4
