= Debelyanov Point =

Coordinates: 62°23′36.3″S 59°40′08″W

Location of Robert Island in the South Shetland Islands.

Topographic map of Livingston Island, Greenwich, Robert, Snow and Smith Islands.

Debelyanov Point (Bulgarian: Дебелянов нос, ‘Debelyanov Nos’ \de-be-'lya-nov 'nos\) is a point forming the northwest side of the entrance to Mitchell Cove in Robert Island, South Shetland Islands. Situated 2.8 km northwest of Negra Point and 3.81 km southeast of Fort William Point. Bulgarian early mapping in 2008. Named after the Bulgarian poet Dimcho Debelyanov (1887–1916).

== Maps ==
- L.L. Ivanov. Antarctica: Livingston Island and Greenwich, Robert, Snow and Smith Islands. Scale 1:120000 topographic map. Troyan: Manfred Wörner Foundation, 2009. ISBN 978-954-92032-6-4
