= Ahrida Peak =

Mountain in Ellsworth Land, Antarctica

- Location within Antarctica

Highest point
- Elevation: 3,116 m (10,223 ft)
- Listing: Mountains in Antarctica
- Coordinates: 78°01′48″S 86°06′46.6″W

Geography
- Location: Ellsworth Land, Antarctica
- Parent range: Sentinel Range

Ahrida Peak (Bulgarian: връх Ахрида, romanized: vrah Ahrida, IPA: [ˈvrɤx ɐˈxridɐ]) is a sharp rocky peak rising to 3116 m on the main crest of north-central Sentinel Range in Ellsworth Mountains, Antarctica. It surmounts Embree Glacier to the southeast. Ahrida is the medieval name of the Eastern Rhodope Mountains in Bulgaria.

== Location ==
Ahrida Peak is located 9.8 km north-northeast of Mount Hale, 6.5 km east of Silyanov Peak, 3.57 km southwest of Mount Goldthwait, and 9.13 km northwest of Mount Todd in Probuda Ridge. US mapping in 1961 and 1988.
