= Cape Garry =

Headland of Antarctica

Coordinates: 63°21′S 62°16′W

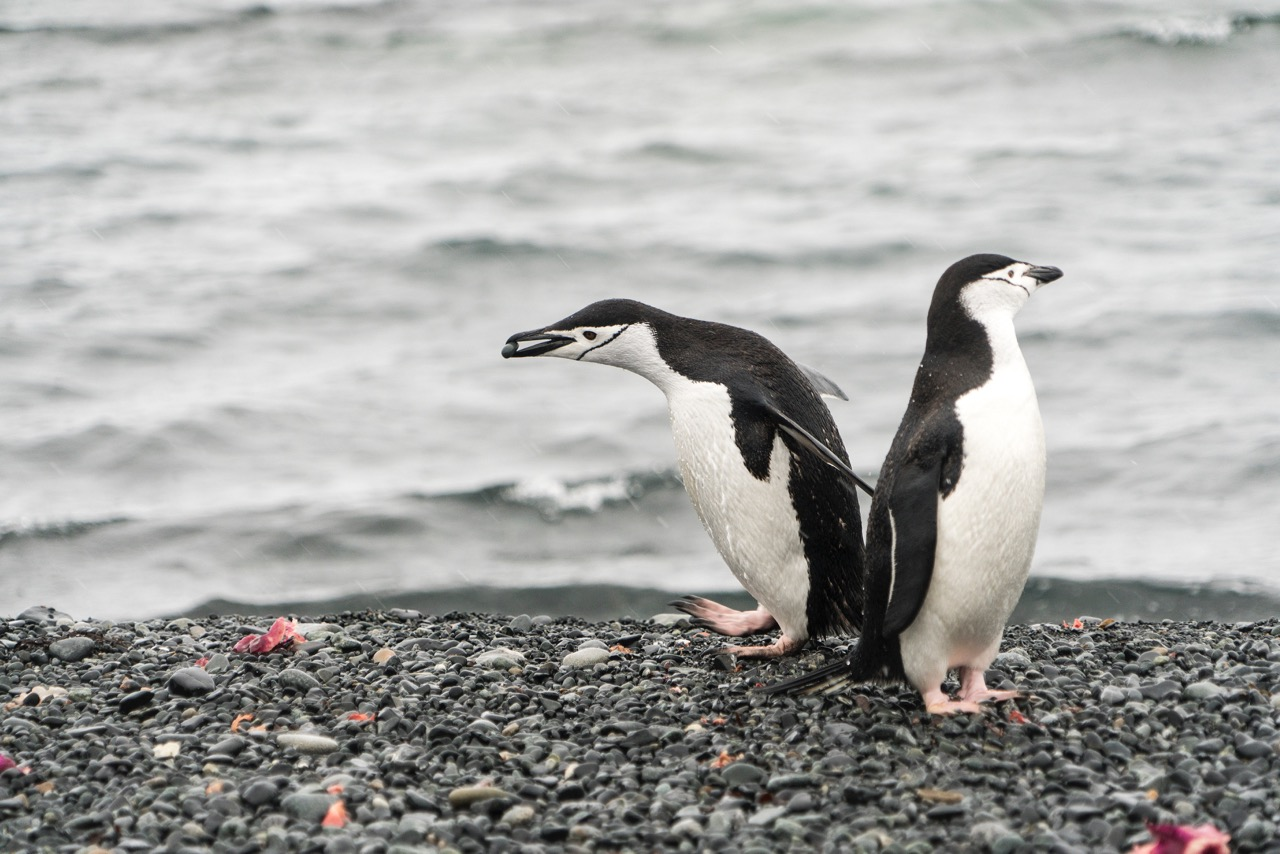
Chinstrap penguins breed in the IBA

Cape Garry is a cape forming the south-western extremity of Low Island in the South Shetland Islands of Antarctica. It was charted and named by a British expedition under Henry Foster, 1828–31, and was more accurately mapped by the Falkland Islands Dependencies Survey in 1959 from aerial photographs taken by the Falkland Islands and Dependencies Aerial Survey Expedition, 1955–57.

== Important Bird Area ==
The site has been identified as an Important Bird Area (IBA) by BirdLife International because it supports a very large breeding colony of about 110,000 pairs of chinstrap penguins, as well as about ten pairs of Antarctic shags.
