= Cape Wallace =

Headland of Antarctica

Coordinates: 63°13′S 62°15′W

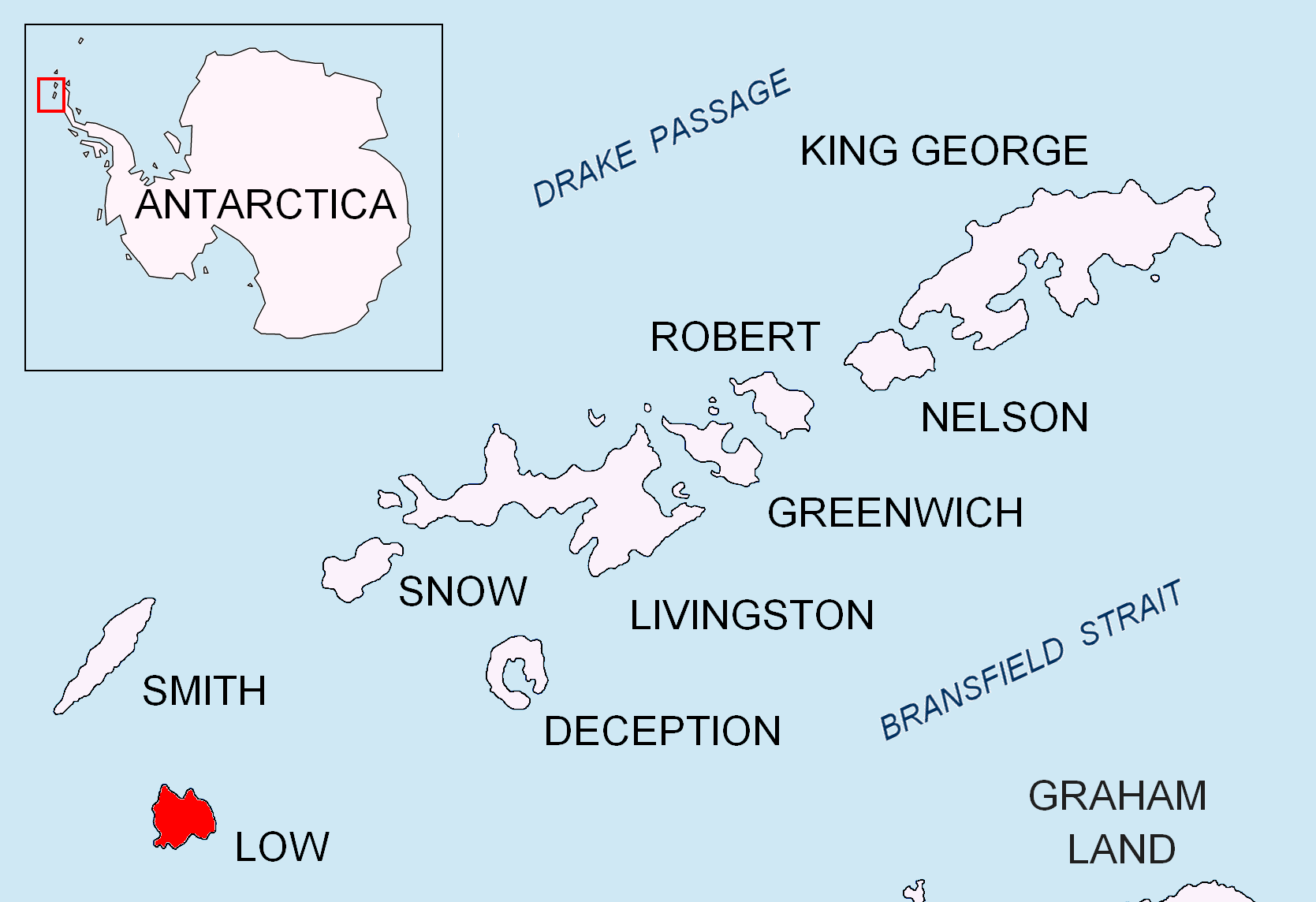
Location of Low Island in the South Shetland Islands

Cape Wallace is the cape marking the northern extremity of Limets Peninsula and the north-west end of Low Island in the South Shetland Islands of Antarctica. Though the origin of the name Cape Wallace is unknown, it has appeared on charts for over a hundred years and its usage has been established internationally.

== Important Bird Area ==
Cape Wallace has been identified as an Important Bird Area (IBA) by BirdLife International because it supports a very large breeding colony of about 150,000 pairs of chinstrap penguins. About 250 pairs of gentoo penguins also nest there.
