= Low Island (South Shetland Islands) =

Island near Smith Island in Antarctica

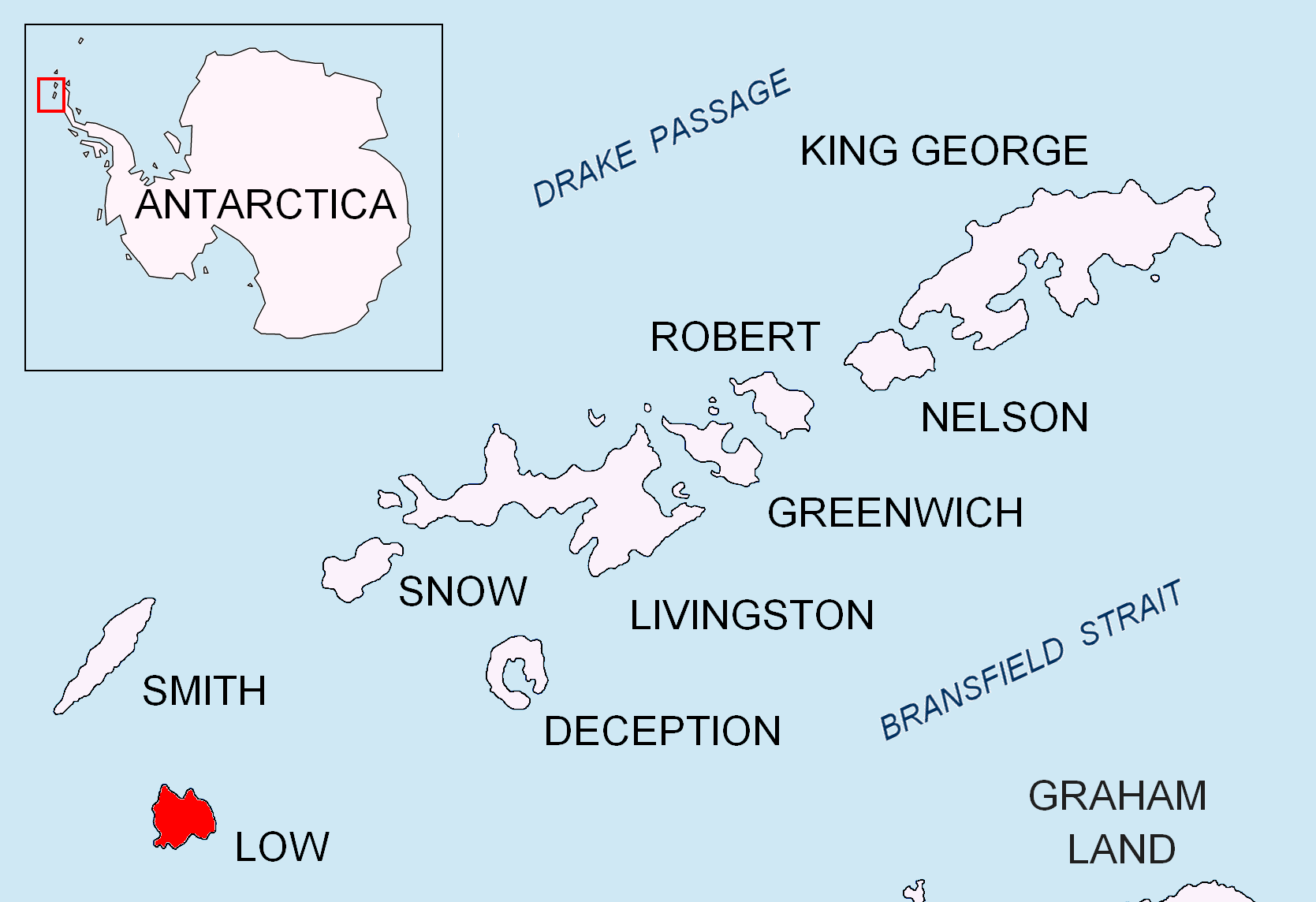
- Location of Low Island in the South Shetland Islands

- Location within South Shetland Islands Location within Antarctica

Geography
- Location: Antarctica
- Coordinates: 63°17′S 62°09′W
- Archipelago: South Shetland Islands
- Length: 9 mi (14 km)
- Width: 5 mi (8 km)

Administration
- Antarctica
- Administered under the Antarctic Treaty System

Demographics
- Population: 0

Low Island or Isla Baja, historical names Jameson Island or Jamesons Island, is an island 9 miles (14 km) long and 5 miles (8 km) wide, 14 miles (23 km) southeast of Smith Island in the South Shetland Islands. The island is located at 63°17′S 62°09′W and is separated from Smith Island by Osmar Strait. Low Island was so named because of its low elevation. Low Island was known to sealers in 1820, and the name Low Island has been established in international usage for 100 years.

Chinstrap penguins breed at Cape Garry on Low island, forming the second largest chinstrap penguin colony on the island at over 100,000 pairs.

== See also ==
- Composite Antarctic Gazetteer
- List of Antarctic islands south of 60° S
- SCAR
- South Shetland Islands
- Territorial claims in Antarctica

== Maps ==
- Chart of South Shetland including Coronation Island, &c. from the exploration of the sloop Dove in the years 1821 and 1822 by George Powell Commander of the same. Scale ca. 1:200000. London: Laurie, 1822.
- South Shetland Islands: Smith and Low Islands. Scale 1:150000 topographic map No. 13677. British Antarctic Survey, 2009.
