= Bulgarian toponyms in Antarctica (K) =

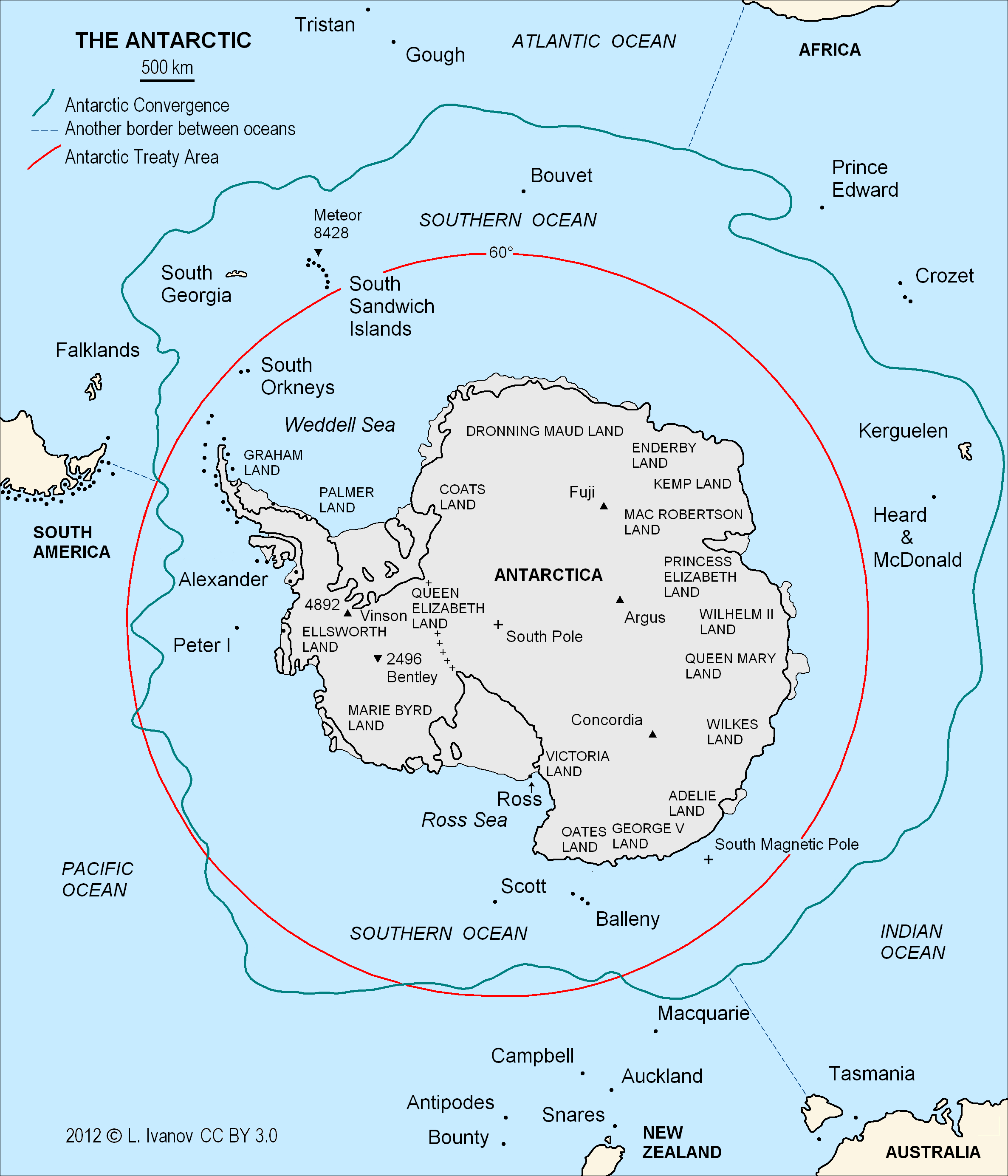
The South Polar Region.

- Kabile Island, Greenwich Island
- Kableshkov Ridge, Nordenskjöld Coast
- Kakrina Point, Clarence Island
- Kaliakra Glacier, Livingston Island
- Kaliman Island, Livingston Island
- Kalina Point, Oscar II Coast
- Kaliva Range, Danco Coast
- Kalmar Island, Wilhelm Archipelago
- Kalofer Peak, Livingston Island
- Kalotina Island, Anvers Island
- Kaloyan Nunatak, Livingston Island
- Kaloyanov Peak, Oscar II Coast
- Kamchiya Glacier, Livingston Island
- Kamenar Point, Davis Coast
- Kamenov Spur, Oscar II Coast
- Kamera Island, Wilhelm Archipelago
- Kamhi Point, Alexander Island
- Kanarata Point, Astrolabe Island
- Kanchov Peak, Loubet Coast
- Kandidiana Ridge, Alexander Island
- Kanitz Nunatak, Trinity Peninsula
- Kapisturia Cove, Danco Coast
- Kapka Lake, Elephant Island
- Kaprela Island, Trinity Island
- Karasura Glacier, Bastien Range
- Karavelova Point, Livingston Island
- Kardam Buttress, Livingston Island
- Kardzhali Point, Livingston Island
- Karia Peak, Graham Coast
- Karlovo Peak, Livingston Island
- Karnare Col, Sentinel Range
- Karnobat Pass, Livingston Island
- Karposh Point, Snow Island
- Kasabova Glacier, Davis Coast
- Kashin Glacier, Fallières Coast
- Kasilag Pass, Sentinel Range
- Kaska Lake, Nelson Island
- Kaspichan Point, Greenwich Island
- Kavarna Cove, Livingston Island
- Kavlak Peak, Nordenskjöld Coast
- Kazanlak Peak, Livingston Island
- Kazichene Cove, Low Island
- Kenderova Buttress, Graham Coast
- Kereka Island, Biscoe Islands
- Kermen Peninsula, Robert Island
- Kerseblept Nunatak, Greenwich Island
- Kesten Point, Oscar II Coast
- Ketripor Hill, Trinity Island
- Kianida Reef, Rugged Island
- Kikish Crag, Livingston Island
- Kilifarevo Island, Aitcho Islands
- Kipra Gap, Sentinel Range
- Kiten Point, Trinity Peninsula
- Kladara Beach, Greenwich Island
- Kladnitsa Peak, Graham Coast
- Kladorub Glacier, Nordenskjöld Coast
- Klamer Island, Wilhelm Archipelago
- Mount Klayn, Bastien Range
- Klenova Peak, Sentinel Range
- Klepalo Hill, Graham Coast
- Kleptuza Glacier, Anvers Island
- Klimash Passage, Greenwich Island
- Mount Kliment Ohridski, Alexander Island
- Klisura Peak, Livingston Island
- Klokotnitsa Ridge, Trinity Peninsula
- Knezha Island, Biscoe Islands
- Kokalyane Point, Rugged Island
- Kokiche Col, Trinity Peninsula
- Kokora Glacier, Oscar II Coast
- Koledari Knoll, Foyn Coast
- Kolobar Nunatak, Trinity Peninsula
- Kolokita Cove, Alexander Island
- Kolosh Glacier, Graham Coast
- Kom Glacier, Fallières Coast
- Komini Peak, Livingston Island
- Komuniga Island, Graham Coast
- Kondofrey Heights, Trinity Peninsula
- Kondolov Peak, Brabant Island
- Kondor Island, Nelson Island
- Kongur Glacier, Smith Island
- Konstantin Buttress, Nordenskjöld Coast
- Konush Hill, Trinity Peninsula
- Kopito Ridge, Trinity Peninsula
- Kopriva Peak, Nordenskjöld Coast
- Kopsis Glacier, Sentinel Range
- Koriten Glacier, Graham Coast
- Kormesiy Peak, Greenwich Island
- Kormoran Island, Wilhelm Archipelago
- Kormyansko Saddle, Danco Coast
- Korsis Island, Snow Island
- Korten Ridge, Davis Coast
- Kosatka Island, Wilhelm Archipelago
- Koshava Island, Zed Islands
- Kostenets Saddle, Smith Island
- Kostenurka Island, Wilhelm Archipelago
- Kostilka Island, Wilhelm Archipelago
- Kostinbrod Pass, Sentinel Range
- Kostov Island, South Orkney Islands
- Kostur Point, Brabant Island
- Kotel Gap, Livingston Island
- Kotev Cove, Two Hummock Island
- Kotis Point, Livingston Island
- Kotlari Peak, Brabant Island
- Kotrag Nunatak, Greenwich Island
- Kovach Island, Robert Island
- Kovil Nunatak, Sentinel Range
- Koynare Rocks, Livingston Island
- Kozhuh Peak, Alexander Island
- Kozloduy Cove, Robert Island
- Kozma Cove, Desolation Island
- Mount Kozyak, Liège Island
- Krakra Bluff, Livingston Island
- Krali Marko Crag, Oscar II Coast
- Kramolin Cove, Greenwich Island
- Kran Peninsula, Liège Island
- Kranevo Point, Tower Island
- Krapets Glacier, Danco Coast
- Krasava Point, Graham Coast
- Krastanov Cove, Elephant Island
- Kremena Ice Piedmont, Smith Island
- Kresna Gully, Livingston Island
- Kribul Hill, Trinity Peninsula
- Krichim Peak, Livingston Island
- Kril Island, Wilhelm Archipelago
- Krivina Bay, Trinity Island
- Krivodol Glacier, Smith Island
- Krivus Island, Biscoe Islands
- Krum Rock, Livingston Island
- Kruni Cove, Robert Island
- Krupen Ridge, Oscar II Coast
- Krusha Peak, Sentinel Range
- Kubadin Point, Smith Island
- Kuber Peak, Livingston Island
- Kubrat Knoll, Livingston Island
- Kudelin Point, Loubet Coast
- Kudoglu Point, Livingston Island
- Kukeri Nunataks, Livingston Island
- Kuklen Point, Livingston Island
- Kukuryak Bluff, Trinity Peninsula
- Kukuzel Cove, Livingston Island
- Kumanovo Peak, Oscar II Coast
- Kumata Hill, Trinity Peninsula
- Kunino Point, Oscar II Coast
- Kurilo Point, Snow Island
- Kusev Point, Pickwick Island
- Kushla Peak, Sentinel Range
- Kutela Cove, Clarence Island
- Kutev Peak, Alexander Island
- Kutlovitsa Glacier, Oscar II Coast
- Kuvikal Point, Krogh Island
- Kuzman Knoll, Livingston Island
- Kuzov Nunatak, Wilhelm Archipelago
- Kyiv Peninsula, Graham Land
- Kyulevcha Nunatak, Oscar II Coast
- Kyustendil Ridge, Nordenskjöld Coast

== See also ==
- Bulgarian toponyms in Antarctica

== Bibliography ==
- J. Stewart. Antarctica: An Encyclopedia. Jefferson, N.C. and London: McFarland, 2011. 1771 pp. ISBN 978-0-7864-3590-6
- L. Ivanov. Bulgarian Names in Antarctica. Sofia: Manfred Wörner Foundation, 2021. Second edition. 539 pp. ISBN 978-619-90008-5-4 (in Bulgarian)
- G. Bakardzhieva. Bulgarian toponyms in Antarctica. Paisiy Hilendarski University of Plovdiv: Research Papers. Vol. 56, Book 1, Part A, 2018 – Languages and Literature, pp. 104-119 (in Bulgarian)
- L. Ivanov and N. Ivanova. Bulgarian names. In: The World of Antarctica. Generis Publishing, 2022. pp. 114-115. ISBN 979-8-88676-403-1
