= Wright Ice Piedmont =

Ice piedmont along the west coast of Graham Land in Antarctica

- Location within Antarctica
- Coordinates: 63°58′S 60°20′W

The Wright Ice Piedmont (63°58′S 60°20′W) is an ice piedmont extending westward from Lanchester Bay along the west coast of Graham Land in Antarctica.

== Location ==
Davis Coast, Antarctic Peninsula. Wright Ice Piedmont towards the southwest end

The Wright Ice Piedmont lies on the Davis Coast on the west side of the Antarctic Peninsula. It faces Trinity Island to the northwest across Orléans Strait. It extends from Curtiss Bay to the southwest to Lanchester Bay to the northeast. Mount Ader and the Detroit Plateau are to the southeast.

- Copernix satellite view

== Mapping and name ==
The Wright Ice Piedmont was photographed by Hunting Aerosurveys in 1955-57 and mapped from these photos by the Falkland Islands Dependencies Survey (FIDS). It was named by the UK Antarctic Place-Names Committee (UK-APC) in 1960 for Wilbur Wright (1867–1912) and his brother Orville Wright (1871–1948), American aeronautical engineers who made the first controlled flights in a powered heavier-than-air machine on December 17, 1903.

== Features ==
=== Havilland Point ===
63°55′S 60°14′W. Point 2 nautical miles (3.7 km; 2.3 mi) east of Cape Page. Photographed by Hunting Aerosurveys Ltd. in 1955-57 and mapped from these photos by the FIDS. Named by the UK-APC in 1960 for Sir Geoffrey de Havilland, English pioneer aircraft designer.

=== Vinitsa Cove ===
63°55′00″S 60°15′30″W A 3.75 kilometres (2.33 mi) wide cove indenting for 1.9 kilometres (1.2 mi) Davis Coast east of Cape Page and west of Havilland Point. Named after the settlement of Vinitsa in Southern Bulgaria.

=== Cape Page ===
63°55′S 60°18′W. Cape lying 13 nautical miles (24 km; 15 mi) southwest of Cape Kater on the west coast of Graham Land. Roughly shown by the Swedish Antarctic Expedition (SwedAE) under Otto Nordenskjöld, 1901-04. Photographed by Hunting Aerosurveys Ltd. in 1955-57 and mapped from these photos by the FIDS. Named by the UK:APC in 1960 for Sir Frederick Handley Page, pioneer aircraft designer and president of the Royal Aeronautical Society, 1945-47.

=== Short Island ===
63°57′S 60°24′W. Island lying 2.5 nautical miles (4.6 km; 2.9 mi) southwest of Cape Page. Shown on an Argentine government chart of 1952. Named by the UK-APC in 1960 for Short Brothers, the British firm started by Eustace and Horace Short, who in 1909 received an order from the Wright brothers to build six aircraft, and thus earned the title of "the first manufacturers of aircraft in the world."

=== Sursuvul Point ===
64°00′25.3″S 60°38′55″W A rocky point on Davis Coast projecting 300 metres (980 ft) high northwards into Orléans Strait. Situated 4 kilometres (2.5 mi) east of Cape Andreas, 12.5 kilometres (7.8 mi) southeast of Skottsberg Point on Trinity Island, 20 kilometres (12 mi) southwest of Cape Page and 4.4 kilometres (2.7 mi) north-northwest of Langley Peak. Named after George Sursuvul, first minister and regent of Bulgaria during the reigns of Tsar Simeon the Great and Tsar Peter I (9th-10th century).

=== Mount Cornu ===
64°09′S 60°35′W. Mountain standing at the head of Gregory Glacier and north of Breguet Glacier. Shown on an Argentine government chart of 1957. Named by the UK-APC in 1960 for Paul Cornu, French engineer who, in a machine of his own construction, was the first man to leave the ground successfully, although not vertically, in a helicopter.

=== Mount Ader ===
64°10′S 60°29′W. Mountain along the north side of Breguet Glacier and just southeast of Mount Cornu. Shown on an Argentine government chart in 1957. Named by the UK-APC in 1960 for Clément Ader (1841-1925), French pioneer aeronaut, probably the first man to leave the ground in a heavier-than-air machine solely as the result of an engine contained in it, in October 1890.

=== Lale Buttress ===
64°11′20″S 60°22′30″W An ice-covered buttress rising to 2,069 metres (6,788 ft) high on the northwest side of the Detroit Plateau. Situated between tributaries to Wright Ice Piedmont, 7.3 kilometres (4.5 mi) east of Mount Ader. Steep and partly ice-free southwest, northwest and northeast slopes. Named after the settlement of Lale in Southern Bulgaria.

=== Stringfellow Glacier ===
64°10′S 60°18′W. A glacier just west of Henson Glacier, flowing north from the Detroit Plateau into Wright Ice Piedmont. Mapped from air photos by Hunting Aerosurveys (1953-57). Named by UK-APC for John Stringfellow (1799-1883), English designer of the first powered model airplane to make a flight, in 1848.

=== Henson Glacier ===
64°06′S 60°11′W. A glacier flowing northward from the Detroit Plateau, and merging with Wright Ice Piedmont about 2 nautical miles (3.7 km; 2.3 mi) southwest of Hargrave Hill. Mapped from air photos taken by Hunting Aerosurveys (1955-57). Named by UK-APC for William Samuel Henson (1805-88), English designer of a powered model airplane (1842-43) which led to widespread aeronautical research and development.

=== Zabernovo Bastion ===
64°06′10″S 60°03′00″W A rounded ice-covered buttress extending 8.5 kilometres (5.3 mi) in southeast–northwest direction and 10.5 kilometres (6.5 mi) in southwest–northeast direction, rising to 1,900 metres (6,200 ft). Situated on the northwest side of Detroit Plateau. Topola Ridge and few smaller ridges branch from the feature on the north. Steep southwest, northwest and east slopes. Surmounts Henson Glacier and its tributary to the southwest and west, and some tributaries to Temple Glacier to the north and east. Named after the settlement of Zabernovo in Southeastern Bulgaria.

=== Topola Ridge ===
64°02′25″S 60°07′00″W An 9 kilometres (5.6 mi) long mostly ice-covered, narrow rocky ridge on Davis Coast, rising to 1,664 metres (5,459 ft) high at its south extremity. Situated on the northwest side of Detroit Plateau, and centred 15.5 kilometres (9.6 mi) south-southeast of Havilland Point. The feature abuts Zabernovo Bastion on the south, extends northwards to Matov Peak and ends in Hargrave Hill. Surmounts some tributaries to Wright Ice Piedmont to the southwest and Temple Glacier to the north and east. Named after the settlement of Topola in Northeastern Bulgaria.

=== Matov Peak ===
64°02′54″S 60°07′15″W The ice-covered peak rising to 1,635 metres (5,364 ft) high in the northwest foothills of Detroit Plateau on Davis Coast in Graham Land. Situated 4.1 kilometres (2.5 mi) south of Hargrave Hill, 16.26 kilometres (10.10 mi) south-southeast of Havilland Point, 11.7 kilometres (7.3 mi) southwest of Volov Peak and 24.2 kilometres (15.0 mi) northeast of Mount Ader. It has steep and partly ice-free west and south slopes. Named after Hristo Matov (1872-1922), a leader of the Bulgarian liberation movement in Macedonia.

=== Hargrave Hill ===
64°01′S 60°11′W. A hill at the south side of Wright Ice Piedmont, 2 nautical miles (3.7 km; 2.3 mi) northeast of the mouth of Henson Glacier. Mapped from air photos taken by Hunting Aerosurveys (1955-57). Named by UK-APC for Lawrence Hargrave (1850-1915), Australian inventor of the box-kite and other fixed wing flying machines, pioneer of rotary aero engines (1884-1909).

== Sources ==
- Alberts, Fred G., ed. (1995), Geographic Names of the Antarctic (PDF) (2 ed.), United States Board on Geographic Names This article incorporates public domain material from websites or documents of the United States Board on Geographic Names.
- Graham Land and South Shetland Islands, BAS: British Antarctic Survey, 2005
- "Lale Buttress", Composite Gazetteer of Antarctica, Scientific Committee on Antarctic Research
- "Matov Peak", Composite Gazetteer of Antarctica, Scientific Committee on Antarctic Research
- "Sursuvul Point", Composite Gazetteer of Antarctica, Scientific Committee on Antarctic Research
- "Topola Ridge", Composite Gazetteer of Antarctica, Scientific Committee on Antarctic Research
- "Vinitsa Cove", Composite Gazetteer of Antarctica, Scientific Committee on Antarctic Research
- "Zabernovo Bastion", Composite Gazetteer of Antarctica, Scientific Committee on Antarctic Research
