= Svilengrad Peninsula =

Peninsula in Antarctica

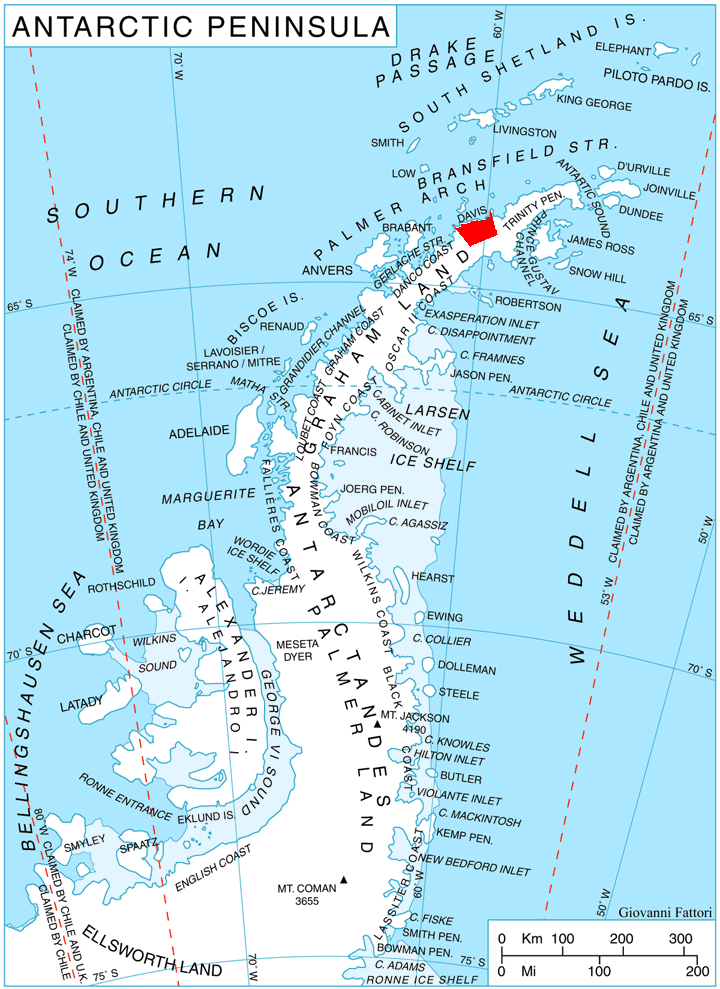
Location of Davis Coast.

Svilengrad Peninsula (Bulgarian: полуостров Свиленград, romanized: poluostrov Svilengrad, IPA: [poɫuˈɔstrof ˈsvilɛŋɡrɐt]) is the mostly ice-covered 5.6-km wide peninsula projecting 5.2 km in northwest direction into Orléans Strait from Davis Coast in Graham Land, Antarctica. It is bounded by Lanchester Bay to the southwest and Jordanoff Bay to the northeast. The peninsula ends in Wennersgaard Point to the northwest, and has its interior occupied by the north part of Korten Ridge.

The peninsula is named after the town of Svilengrad in Southern Bulgaria, location of an early Bulgarian Air Force base used during the First Balkan War 1912–1913.

== Location ==
Svilengrad Peninsula is located at 63°52′15″S 59°54′00″W. German-British mapping in 1996.

== Maps ==
- Trinity Peninsula. Scale 1:250000 topographic map No. 5697. Institut für Angewandte Geodäsie and British Antarctic Survey, 1996.
- Antarctic Digital Database (ADD). Scale 1:250000 topographic map of Antarctica. Scientific Committee on Antarctic Research (SCAR), 1993–2016.
