= Pelikan Island =

Island in Palmer Archipelago, Antarctica

- Location within Antarctica Location within Antarctic Peninsula

Geography
- Location: Antarctica
- Coordinates: 63°52′22″S 60°53′46″W
- Archipelago: Palmer Archipelago
- Length: 290 m (950 ft)
- Width: 160 m (520 ft)

Administration
- Antarctica
- Administered under the Antarctic Treaty System

Demographics
- Population: uninhabited

Pelikan Island (Bulgarian: остров Пеликан, romanized: ostrov Pelikan, IPA: [ˈɔstrof pɛliˈkan]) is the 290 m long in southwest-northeast direction and 160 m wide rocky island lying in Belimel Bay on the southwest coast of Trinity Island in the Palmer Archipelago, Antarctica. It is “named after the ocean fishing trawler Pelikan of the Bulgarian company Ocean Fisheries – Burgas whose ships operated in the waters of South Georgia, Kerguelen, the South Orkney Islands, South Shetland Islands and Antarctic Peninsula from 1970 to the early 1990s. The Bulgarian fishermen, along with those of the Soviet Union, Poland and East Germany are the pioneers of modern Antarctic fishing industry.”

== Location ==
Pelikan Island is located at 63°52′22″S 60°53′46″W, which is 3.1 km north of Asencio Point, 165 m north-northeast of Alka Island, 1.95 km southeast of Bulnes Point and 470 m southwest of Tizoin Point. British mapping in 1978.

== Maps ==
- British Antarctic Territory. Scale 1:200000 topographic map. DOS 610 – W 63 60. Tolworth, UK, 1978.
- Antarctic Digital Database (ADD). Scale 1:250000 topographic map of Antarctica. Scientific Committee on Antarctic Research (SCAR). Since 1993, regularly upgraded and updated.
