= Kamenar =

Kamenar may refer to:

- Kamenar, Burgas Province, Bulgaria
- Kamenar, Razgrad Province, Bulgaria
- Kamenar, Varna Province, Bulgaria
- Kamenar Point, Antarctica
- Kamenar (surname)
