= Ralida Island =

Island in Palmer Archipelago, Antarctica

- Location within Antarctica Location within Antarctic Peninsula

Geography
- Location: Antarctica
- Coordinates: 63°53′36″S 60°54′03″W
- Archipelago: Palmer Archipelago
- Length: 320 m (1050 ft)
- Width: 80 m (260 ft)

Administration
- Antarctica
- Administered under the Antarctic Treaty System

Demographics
- Population: uninhabited

Ralida Island (Bulgarian: остров Ралида, romanized: ostrov Ralida, IPA: [ˈɔstrof rɐˈlidɐ]) is the 320 m long in west–east direction and 80 m wide rocky island lying in Belimel Bay on the southwest coast of Trinity Island in the Palmer Archipelago, Antarctica. It is “named after the ocean fishing trawler Ralida of the Bulgarian company Ocean Fisheries – Burgas whose ships operated in the waters of South Georgia, Kerguelen, the South Orkney Islands, South Shetland Islands and Antarctic Peninsula from 1970 to the early 1990s. The Bulgarian fishermen, along with those of the Soviet Union, Poland and East Germany are the pioneers of modern Antarctic fishing industry.”

== Location ==
Ralida Island is located at 63°53′36″S 60°54′03″W, which is 1.12 km north of Asencio Point, 180 m southeast of Glarus Island, 4.16 km south-southeast of Bulnes Point and 2.86 km south of Tizoin Point. British mapping in 1978.

== Maps ==
- British Antarctic Territory. Scale 1:200000 topographic map. DOS 610 – W 63 60. Tolworth, UK, 1978.
- Antarctic Digital Database (ADD). Scale 1:250000 topographic map of Antarctica. Scientific Committee on Antarctic Research (SCAR). Since 1993, regularly upgraded and updated.
