= Curtiss Bay =

Body of water in Graham Land, Antarctica

- Location within Antarctica
- Coordinates: 64°2′S 60°47′W

Curtiss Bay (64°2′S 60°47′W) is a bay about 4 nautical miles (7.4 km; 4.6 mi) wide, indenting the west coast of Graham Land between Cape Sterneck and Cape Andreas on the Davis Coast.

== Location ==
Davis Coast, Antarctic Peninsula. Curtiss Bay at the southwest end

Curtiss Bay lies on the Davis Coast on the west side of the Antarctic Peninsula. It faces Trinity Island across the Orléans Strait. Cape Herschel on the Chavdar Peninsula defines the bay's western extremity. The Wright Ice Piedmont is to the southeast, and Lanchester Bay is to the east.

== Name ==
The name Bahia Inutil (useless bay) appearing on a 1957 Argentine chart is considered misleading; the bay has been used as an anchorage. The bay was renamed by the UK Antarctic Place-Names Committee (UK-APC) in 1960 for Glenn Curtiss, an American aeronautical engineer who pioneered seaplanes from 1911 onward.

== Features ==
Features of the bay, and nearby features, include:

=== Cape Andreas ===
64°00′S 60°43′W. A cape marking the east side of the entrance to Curtiss Bay. Discovered by the Swedish Antarctic Expedition (SwedAE; 1901–04) and named for Karl Andreas Andersson, zoologist of the expedition.

=== Roe Island ===
64°00′S 60°50′W. An island lying in the entrance of Curtiss Bay, about 2 nautical miles (3.7 km; 2.3 mi) west of Cape Andreas. Mapped from air photos taken by Hunting Aerosurveys (1955–57). Named by the UK Antarctic Place-Names Committee (UK-APC) for Sir Alliott Verdon Roe, English pioneer aircraft designer and aviator since 1908; founder of A.V. Roe and Co., Ltd. (later SaundersRoe Ltd.).

=== Seaplane Point ===
64°03′S 60°46′W. A point at the south side of Curtiss Bay. Mapped from air photos taken by Hunting Aerosurveys (1955–57). Named by UK-APC in association with Curtiss Bay.

=== Boulton Peak ===
64°06′S 60°42′W. A peak at the southeast side of Curtiss Bay, about 5 nautical miles (9.3 km; 5.8 mi) south of Cape Andreas. Mapped from air photos taken by Hunting Aerosurveys (1955–57). Named by UK-APC for Matthew Piers Watt Boulton, English inventor of ailerons for lateral control of aircraft, in 1868.

=== Langley Peak ===
64°02′S 60°36′W. A peak 3 nautical miles (5.6 km; 3.5 mi) east of Curtiss Bay, rising above the west end of Wright Ice Piedmon. Mapped from air photos taken by Hunting Aerosurveys (1955–57). Named by UK-APC for Samuel Langley (1834-1906), American mathematician, one time Secretary of the Smithsonian Institution, designer of the first satisfactory powered model airplane, in 1896.

== Sources ==
- Alberts, Fred G., ed. (1995), Geographic Names of the Antarctic (PDF) (2 ed.), United States Board on Geographic Names This article incorporates public domain material from websites or documents of the United States Board on Geographic Names.
- Graham Land and South Shetland Islands, BAS: British Antarctic Survey, 2005
