= Chayka Passage =

Passage between islands in Antarctica

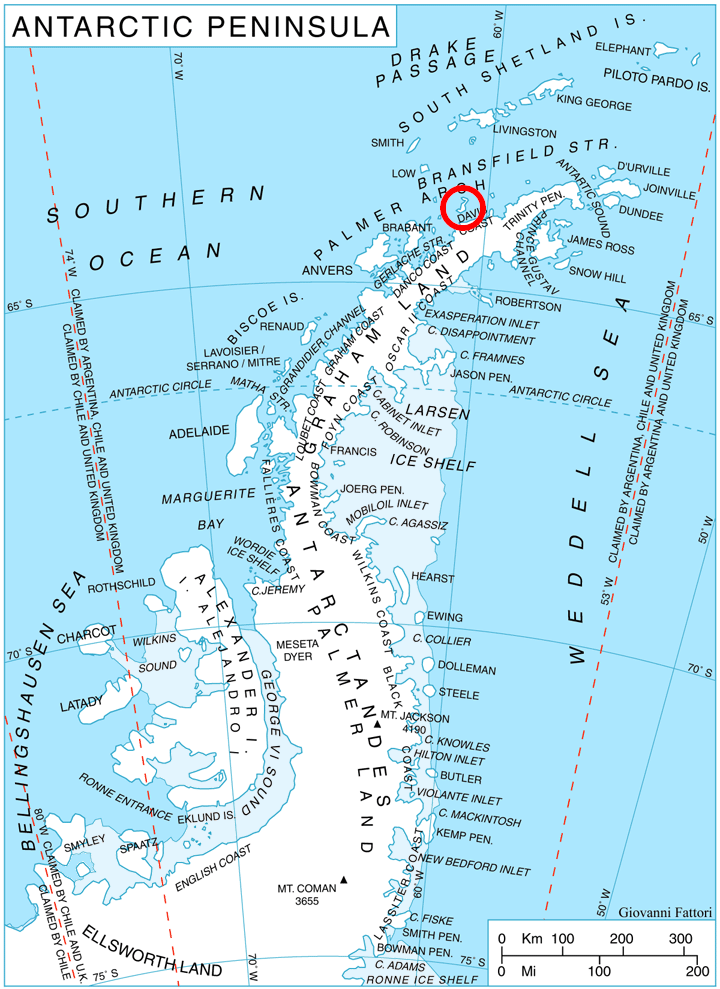
Location of Trinity Island in the Antarctic Peninsula region

Chayka Passage (Bulgarian: проток Чайка, ‘Protok Chayka’ \'pro-tok 'chay-ka\) is the 1 km long in south–north direction and 110 m wide passage between Spert Island and the southwest coast of Trinity Island in the Palmer Archipelago, Antarctica. Its south entrance is situated just west of Bulnes Point. The vertical cliffs of Symplegades rise either side of the feature.

The passage is “named after the ocean fishing trawler Chayka of the Bulgarian company Ocean Fisheries – Burgas whose ships operated in the waters of South Georgia, Kerguelen, the South Orkney Islands, South Shetland Islands and Antarctic Peninsula from 1970 to the early 1990s. The Bulgarian fishermen, along with those of the Soviet Union, Poland and East Germany are the pioneers of modern Antarctic fishing industry.”

== Location ==
Chayka Passage is centred at 63°51′12″S 60°55′14″W. British mapping in 1978.

== Maps ==
- British Antarctic Territory. Scale 1:200000 topographic map. DOS 610 – W 63 60. Tolworth, UK, 1978.
- Antarctic Digital Database (ADD). Scale 1:250000 topographic map of Antarctica. Scientific Committee on Antarctic Research (SCAR). Since 1993, regularly upgraded and updated.
