= Kapka =

Kapka can refer to:

== People ==
- Zdzisław Kapka (born 1954), Polish football player
- Kapka Georgieva (born 1951), Bulgarian rower
- Kapka Kassabova (born 1973), Bulgarian poet and writer
- Bojan Miladinović, nicknamed "Kapka" (born 1982), Serbian footballer

== Other ==
- Kapka Lake, South Shetland Islands
- Kapka Tash Lake, Kyrgyzstan

== See also ==
- Kapkan (disambiguation)
- Kappa (disambiguation)
- Kopka (disambiguation)
