= Dumoulin Rocks =

The Dumoulin Rocks (63°29′S 59°46′W) are a group of rocks 4 nautical miles (7 km) northeast of Cape Leguillou, the northern tip of Tower Island, in the Palmer Archipelago. The French expedition under Captain Jules Dumont d'Urville, 1837–40, applied the name Dumoulin Rocks for Clément Adrien Vincendon-Dumoulin, hydrographer of the expedition, to a group of small rocks in this area, in complement of the Dumoulin Islands located near the Adélie Land and comprising for them the Debarquement Rock . A study of air photos has shown that there are two groups of rocks. The southwest group has been named Kendall Rocks and the northeast group Dumoulin Rocks.
