= Kaprela Island =

Island in the Antarctic

- Location within Antarctica Location within Antarctic Peninsula

Geography
- Location: Antarctica
- Coordinates: 63°45′47″S 60°38′41″W
- Archipelago: Palmer Archipelago
- Length: 500 m (1600 ft)
- Width: 150 m (490 ft)

Administration
- Antarctica
- Administered under the Antarctic Treaty System

Demographics
- Population: uninhabited

Kaprela Island (Bulgarian: остров Капрела, romanized: ostrov Kaprela, IPA: [ˈɔstrof kɐˈprɛɫɐ]) is the mostly ice-covered rocky island 500 m long in southeast-northwest direction and 150 m wide, lying off the northeast coast of Trinity Island in the Palmer Archipelago, Antarctica.

It is “named after the ocean fishing trawler Kaprela of the Bulgarian company Ocean Fisheries – Burgas whose ships operated in the waters of South Georgia, Kerguelen, the South Orkney Islands, South Shetland Islands and Antarctic Peninsula from 1970 to the early 1990s. The Bulgarian fishermen, along with those of the Soviet Union, Poland and East Germany are the pioneers of modern Antarctic fishing industry.”

== Location ==
Kaprela Island is located at 63°45′47″S 60°38′41″W, which is 8.43 km southwest of Cape Neumayer and 10.67 km north of Awl Point. British mapping in 1978.

== Maps ==
- British Antarctic Territory. Scale 1:200000 topographic map. DOS 610 – W 63 60. Tolworth, UK, 1978.
- Antarctic Digital Database (ADD). Scale 1:250000 topographic map of Antarctica. Scientific Committee on Antarctic Research (SCAR). Since 1993, regularly upgraded and updated.
