= Cape Andreas =

Cape Andreas may refer to:

- Cape Andreas (Antarctica), a point on Curtiss Bay, Graham Land, Antarctica
- Cape Apostolos Andreas, the north-easternmost point (promontory) of the Mediterranean island of Cyprus
