= Alka Island =

Island in Antarctica

- Location within Antarctica Location within Antarctic Peninsula

Geography
- Location: Antarctica
- Coordinates: 63°53′18″S 60°54′25″W
- Archipelago: Palmer Archipelago
- Length: 250 m (820 ft)
- Width: 110 m (360 ft)

Administration
- Antarctica
- Administered under the Antarctic Treaty System

Demographics
- Population: uninhabited

Alka Island (Bulgarian: остров Алка, romanized: ostrov Alka, IPA: [ˈɔstrof ˈaɫkɐ]) is the 250 m long in west–east direction and 110 m wide rocky island lying in Belimel Bay on the southwest coast of Trinity Island in the Palmer Archipelago, Antarctica. It is “named after the ocean fishing trawler Alka of the Bulgarian company Ocean Fisheries – Burgas whose ships operated in the waters of South Georgia, Kerguelen, the South Orkney Islands, South Shetland Islands and Antarctic Peninsula from 1970 to the early 1990s. The Bulgarian fishermen, along with those of the Soviet Union, Poland and East Germany are the pioneers of modern Antarctic fishing industry.”

== Location ==
Alka Island is located at 63°53′18″S 60°54′25″W, which is 1.7 km north of Asencio Point, 3.43 km south of Bulnes Point, 2.4 km south-southwest of Tizoin Point and 145 m north-northwest of Glarus Island. British mapping in 1978.

== Maps ==
- British Antarctic Territory. Scale 1:200000 topographic map. DOS 610 – W 63 60. Tolworth, UK, 1978.
- Antarctic Digital Database (ADD). Scale 1:250000 topographic map of Antarctica. Scientific Committee on Antarctic Research (SCAR). Since 1993, regularly upgraded and updated.
