= Sabine Glacier =

Antarctic glacier

- Location within Antarctica
- Coordinates: 63°55′S 59°47′W

Sabine Glacier (63°55′S 59°47′W) is a glacier terminating at the sea between Wennersgaard Point and Cape Kater on the northwest coast of Graham Land, Antarctica.

== Location ==
Davis Coast, Antarctic Peninsula. Sabine Glacier towards the northeast end

The Sabine Glacier is on the Davis Coast on the west side of the Antarctic Peninsula. It drains north into the Orléans Strait to the west of Cape Kater. Lanchester Bay is to the west, Detroit Plateau to the south and Charcot Bay to the east.

== Name ==
Captain Henry Foster gave the name "Cape Sabine" in 1829 to a feature lying southeast of Cape Kater but it has not been possible to identify that cape. This toponym preserves the early use of Sabine in this area. Sir Edward Sabine (1788–1883), English astronomer and geodesist, was a member of the committee which planned the 1829 voyage of Foster in the Chanticleer.

== Features ==
Features from south to north, include:

=== Tsarevets Buttress ===
63°58′50″S 59°40′10″W. A rounded ice-covered buttress extending 7 kilometres (4.3 mi) in N-S direction and 7 kilometres (4.3 mi) in E-W direction, rising to 1,868 metres (6,129 ft) high. Situated on the northwest side of Detroit Plateau. Connected to Korten Ridge on the west-northwest by Podvis Col. Steep and partly ice-free southwest, north and east slopes. Surmounts Temple Glacier to the southwest Sabine Glacier to the northwest and Whitecloud Glacier to the north-northeast and east. German-British mapping in 1996. Named after Tsarevets Hill in the city of Veliko Tarnovo, the seat of the Bulgarian royal court in the 12th-14th centuries.

=== Podvis Col ===
63°58′51″S 59°46′39″W. An ice-covered col of elevation 1,568 metres (5,144 ft) high, extending 1.6 kilometres (0.99 mi) between Korten Ridge to the northwest and Detroit Plateau to the SE. Overlooking Sabine Glacier to the north and Temple Glacier to the SW. Named after the settlement of Podvis in Southeastern Bulgaria.

=== Jordanoff Bay ===
63°50′20″S 59°52′00″W. The 5 kilometres (3.1 mi) wide bay indenting for 4.9 kilometres (3.0 mi) Davis Coast. Entered between Wennersgaard Point and Tarakchiev Point. Named for the Bulgarian-American pioneer of aviation Assen Jordanoff (1896–1967) who built the first Bulgarian airplane in 1915 and took part in the construction of B-17 and other US planes.

=== Kamenar Point ===
63°50′48″S 59°54′14″W. The narrow rocky point on Davis Coast in Graham Land projecting 650 metres (2,130 ft) high northwards into Jordanoff Bay. Situated on the east side of the entrance to Hvoyna Cove, 1.7 kilometres (1.1 mi) east of Wennersgaard Point, 4.2 kilometres (2.6 mi) south-southwest of Tarakchiev Point, and 1.95 kilometres (1.21 mi) north of Sratsimir Hill. German-British mapping in 1996. Named after the settlements of Kamenar, Burgas Province and Kamenar, Varna Province in northeastern and southeastern Bulgaria.

=== Tarakchiev Point ===
63°48′44″S 59°52′13″W. A point forming the west extremity of Whittle Peninsula. Situated 4.4 kilometres (2.7 mi) south-southwest of Cape Kater and 5 kilometres (3.1 mi) northeast of Wennersgaard Point. Named for the Bulgarian pioneer of aviation Prodan Tarakchiev (1885–1969) who, while on a joint combat air mission with Radul Milkov during the First Balkan War, used the first air-dropped bombs on October 16, 1912.

== Sources ==
- Alberts, Fred G., ed. (1995), Geographic Names of the Antarctic (PDF) (2 ed.), United States Board on Geographic Names This article incorporates public domain material from websites or documents of the United States Board on Geographic Names.
- Graham Land and South Shetland Islands, BAS: British Antarctic Survey, 2005
- "Jordanoff Bay", Composite Gazetteer of Antarctica, Scientific Committee on Antarctic Research
- "Kamenar Point", Composite Gazetteer of Antarctica, Scientific Committee on Antarctic Research
- "Podvis Col", Composite Gazetteer of Antarctica, Scientific Committee on Antarctic Research
- "Tarakchiev Point", Composite Gazetteer of Antarctica, Scientific Committee on Antarctic Research
- "Tsarevets Buttress", Composite Gazetteer of Antarctica, Scientific Committee on Antarctic Research
