= Lyon Peak =

Antarctican peak

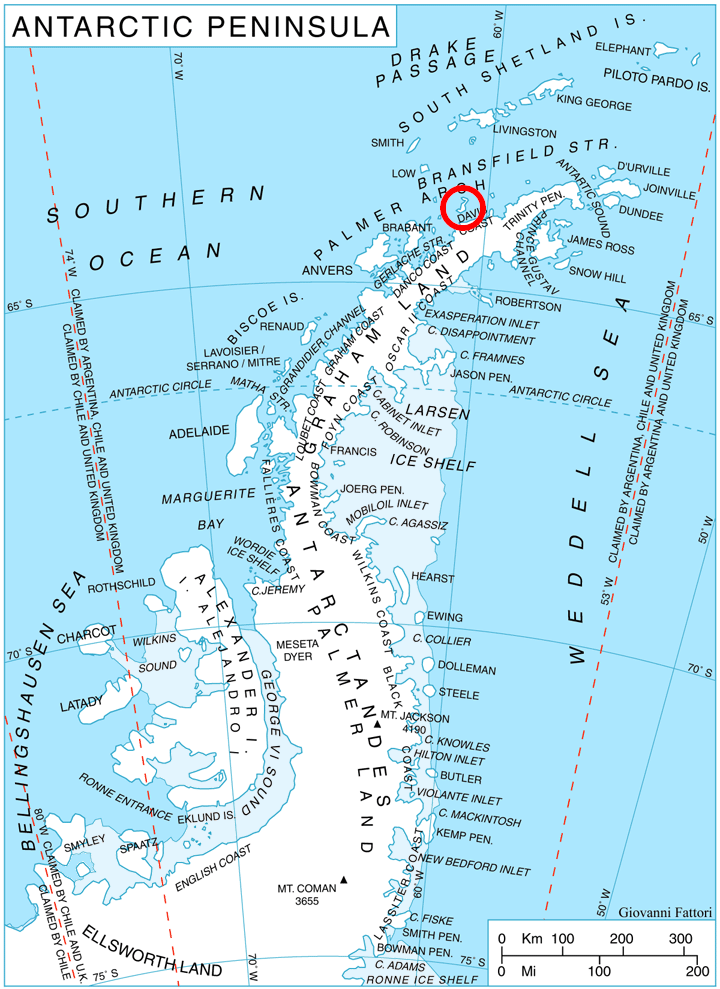
Location of Trinity Island in the Antarctic Peninsula region.

Lyon Peak (63°47′S 60°48′W) is a peak rising to about 1,000 metres (3,300 ft) south of Milburn Bay on the west side of Trinity Island, in the Palmer Archipelago, Antarctica. It was photographed by the Falkland Islands and Dependencies Aerial Survey Expedition, 1956, and mapped from these photos. The peak was named by the UK Antarctic Place-Names Committee in 1960 after Percy C. Lyon (1862–1952) of the British Department of Scientific and Industrial Research, who was chairman of the interdepartmental committee on research and development of the Antarctic area, 1917–20.
