= Kopka =

Kopka can refer to:

== People ==
- Angeline Kopka (1916–2016), American politician
- Bogusław Tadeusz Kopka (born 1969), Polish historian and professor
- Łukasz Kopka (born 1996), Polish footballer
- Raymond Kopka (born 1971), British weightlifter

== Other uses ==
- Kopka language, spoken in Highland Papua, Indonesia
- Kopka River, Ontario, Canada

== See also ==
- Kapka (disambiguation)
