= Kamenar, Varna Province =

Kamenar Каменар
- Village
- Location in Bulgaria
- Coordinates: 43.248°N 27.908°E
- Country: Bulgaria
- Province: Varna Province
- Municipality: Varna Municipality
- Elevation: 300 m (980 ft)

Population (2015-03-15)
  - Total: 2,822
- Postal code: 9102

Kamenar (Bulgarian: Каменар) is a village in northeastern Bulgaria. It is located in the municipality of Varna, Varna Province.

As of March 2015, the village has a population of 2,822.

== Honours ==
Kamenar Point on Davis Coast, Antarctica is named after the village.
