= Kandidiana Ridge =

Location of Alexander Island in the Antarctic Peninsula region

Satellite image of Alexander Island

Kandidiana Ridge (Bulgarian: рид Кандидиана, ‘Rid Kandidiana’ \'rid kan-di-di-'a-na\) is the partly ice-free ridge extending 6 km and 1.1 km wide, rising to 1176 m on the west side of Elgar Uplands in northern Alexander Island, Antarctica. It is crescent-shaped facing north-northwest, and surmounts Nichols Snowfield to the northwest, Delius Glacier to the northeast and Bartók Glacier to the south. The vicinity was visited on 30 January 1988 by the geological survey team of Christo Pimpirev and Borislav Kamenov (First Bulgarian Antarctic Expedition), and Philip Nell and Peter Marquis (British Antarctic Survey).

The feature is named after the ancient Roman fortress of Kandidiana in Northeastern Bulgaria.

== Location ==
The ridge is located at 69°39′42″S 71°01′32″W, which is 4.45 km west-northwest of Kozhuh Peak, 12.24 km north-northwest of Mount Pinafore, 18.67 km east of Mount Morley in Lassus Mountains, 15.26 km southeast of Shaw Nunatak and 9 km south of Tegra Nunatak.

== Maps ==
- British Antarctic Territory. Scale 1:200000 topographic map. DOS 610 – W 69 70. Tolworth, UK, 1971
- Antarctic Digital Database (ADD). Scale 1:250000 topographic map of Antarctica. Scientific Committee on Antarctic Research (SCAR). Since 1993, regularly upgraded and updated
