= Robert Fabyan =

15th/16th-century English chronicler

- Died: c.1512 London
- Buried: St Michael's, Cornhill, London
- Spouse: Elizabeth Pake
- Issue: John Fabyan; Robert Fabyan; Thomas Fabyan; Anthony Fabyan; Joan Fabyan; Mary Fabyan
- Father: John Fabyan
- Mother: Agnes (surname unknown)

Robert Fabyan (died c.1512) was a London draper, Sheriff and Alderman, and author of Fabyan's Chronicle.

== Family ==
Robert Fabyan was the son of John Fabyan and his wife, Agnes. He is said to have been born in London. He had a brother, John. His nephew, John Fabyan, married Anne Waldegrave, by whom he had a daughter, Mary Fabian, wife of Sir Thomas Spert.

== Career ==
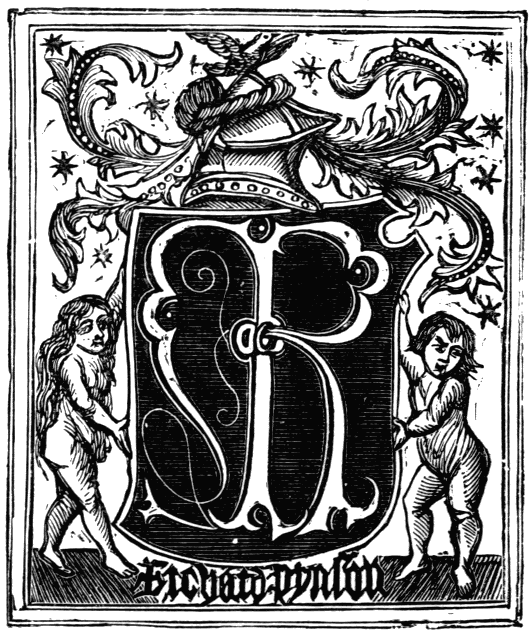
Mark of Richard Pynson, who printed Fabyan's Chronicle

He was apprenticed as a draper to William Holme about 1470, and was granted the freedom of the Worshipful Company of Drapers in 1476. In 1485 he served as renter warden of the Drapers, and in 1486 as auditor of the accounts of the City of London. In 1493 he was elected Sheriff, and in the following year as alderman of the ward of Farringdon Without. In 1495 he was elected Master of the Drapers, and in 1496 was chosen to petition Henry VII on behalf of the Company with respect to the levies on cloth exported from England to Flanders. During the Cornish Rebellion of 1497 Fabyan, John Brooke and John Warner were charged with securing Ludgate and Newgate. After the suppression of the rebellion they travelled with the King to Woodstock. In 1498 he was one of the assessors of a subsidy levied to finance the war in Scotland. In 1501 he was again elected Master of the Drapers. In 1503 he resigned his office of alderman on the ground that he lacked the financial resources to support election as Lord Mayor.

He is best known as the author of the work commonly known as Fabyan's Chronicle, which presents 'parallel histories of England and France', and covers the period from the arrival of the legendary Brutus of Troy in England to the death of Henry VII. Two manuscripts are extant (Holkham Hall, MS 671, and BL, Cotton MS Nero C.xi), and although these are not in Fabyan's hand, it is almost certain that the text is his. The chronicle was initially printed without attribution by Richard Pynson in 1516 as The New Chronicles of England and France, but an edition of 1533 printed by William Rastell bore Fabyan's name on the title page: Fabyans cronycle newly prynted. Both John Bale and John Stow described the chronicle as Fabyan's work, although according to McLaren, Stow also wrongly attributes to him the manuscript of the Great Chronicle (London, Guildhall Library, MS 3313), likely because both Fabyan's Chronicle and the Great Chronicle are written (or copied) in the same hand.

A continuation in 1509 appears also to be attributable to Fabyan, and includes events personally witnessed by him, such as the arrest in 1468 of Thomas Cooke, a prominent merchant in London, and the arrival in England in 1502 of three men, inhabitants of Newfoundland, 'whom the King kept a time after'.

Fabyan was the first London chronicler to cite his sources, which included The Brut, Bede, William of Malmesbury, Ranulf Higden, Henry of Huntingdon and numerous others, as well as records of the City of London. John Bale claimed that the 1516 edition was burned by Cardinal Wolsey. The second edition of 1533 was printed after Wolsey's death, and was followed by editions in 1542 and 1559. Henry Ellis edited a modern edition in 1811.

Fabyan was executor of the will of his father-in-law, and through his wife inherited a house called Halstedys together with other lands in Theydon Garnon, Essex. At his death he also owned tenements in the London parishes of St Benet Fink and St Michael's, Cornhill, as well as lands and tenements in East Ham, West Ham, Leyton and other towns in Essex.

Stow states that Fabyan died in 1511, while Bale dates his death to 25 February 1512. Stow also records that he was buried at St Michael's Cornhill, where his monument is no longer extant, although Stow preserved the English part of his epitaph. In his will, proved 12 July 1513, he left bequests to his wife, his six surviving children, his cousin, Dorothy, and the mercer Robert Tate, Lord Mayor of London, among others.

== Marriage and issue ==
Fabyan married Elizabeth Pake, daughter and heir of a London draper, John Pake, by Elizabeth Stokker, by whom he had sixteen children, only six of whom, four sons, John, Robert, Thomas, and Anthony, and two daughters, Joan Haryat and Mary, were alive at his death.

Ellis notes that a John Fabyan, in his will dated 16 March 1541, mentions 'the Lady Spert' (see above) as his sister, and refers to the Earl of Southampton as his master. He also mentions another sister, Martha, to whom he bequeaths four nobles yearly, and the Lady Marney, to whom he bequeaths his books of meditation and his chronicles. McLaren suggest that this might be the will of 'a grandson of Robert'; however Baldwin's statement that Robert Fabyan had a nephew, John Fabyan, whose daughter Mary married Sir Thomas Spert (see above), suggests that the 1541 will was the will of the son of Robert Fabyan's nephew.
