= Gilbert Strait =

Gilbert Strait (63°38′S 60°16′W) is a strait between Trinity Island and Tower Island in the Palmer Archipelago. The strait was named by a British expedition 1828–31, under Foster, for Davies Gilbert, President of the Royal Society from 1827–30, and of the committee which formulated the objectives of the expedition. The strait was mapped by the Swedish Antarctic Expedition (SAE) of 1901–04, under Otto Nordenskjöld.

Within the Gilbert Strait, 3.5 nmi (6.5 km) off the east coast of Cape Neumayer on Trinity Island, is a small group of rocks called the Oluf Rocks. Just south of them is Sven Rock, and to the east are the Ryge Rocks.

All of these rocks were first photographed by the Falkland Islands and Dependencies Aerial Survey Expedition (FIDASE) in 1955–57, mapped from these photos by the Falkland Islands Dependencies Survey (FIDS), and subsequently named by the United Kingdom Antarctic Place-Names Committee (UK-APC) in 1960 after the Danish freighter Oluf Sven and its captain, J.C. Ryge. The freighter transported the FIDASE to Deception Island in 1955 and 1956.
