= Pearl Rocks =

Islands of Antarctica

Coordinates: 63°35′S 59°56′W

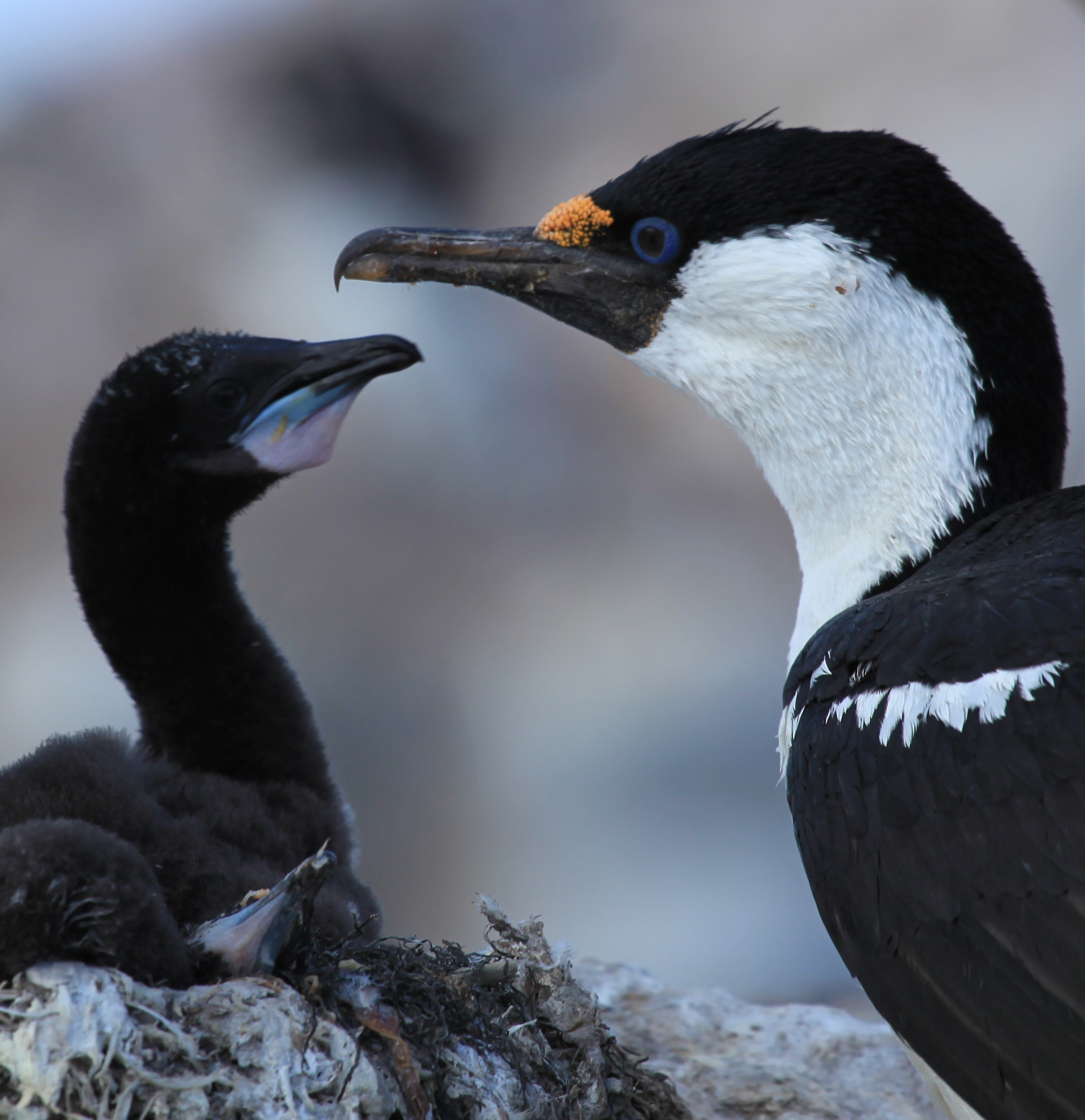
Antarctic shags breed in the IBA

The Pearl Rocks are a group of rocks covering an area 6 km (3.7 mi) by 4 km (2.5 mi) close to the west coast of Tower Island in the Palmer Archipelago of Antarctica. The name was given by Falkland Islands and Dependencies Aerial Survey Expedition (FIDASE) (1955–57) and is descriptive of the numerous snow-covered rocks in the group.

== Important Bird Area ==
The site has been identified as an Important Bird Area (IBA) by BirdLife International because it supports a breeding colony of about 170 pairs of Antarctic shags.
