= Thomas Spert =

English sailor (c. 1483–1541)

Vice-Admiral Sir Thomas Spert
- Born: c. 1483; England
- Died: December 1541 (aged 57–58); Stepney, London, England
- Burial place: St Dunstan's and All Saints, Church, Stepney, London, England
- Military career
- Allegiance: Kingdom of England
- Branch: Navy Royal
- Service years: 1512–1541
- Rank: Vice-Admiral
- Commands: Vice-Admiral of England; Clerk Comptroller of the Navy; Master of the Mary Rose; Master of the Henry Grace a Dieu

Vice-Admiral of England Sir Thomas Spert (spelled in some records as Pert) (died December 1541) was a mariner who reached the rank of vice admiral in service to King Henry VIII of England. He was sailing master of the flagships Mary Rose and Henry Grace a Dieu. He served as the first Master of Trinity House, the private corporation for maritime affairs in London. Spert Island off the coast of Antarctica is named for him.

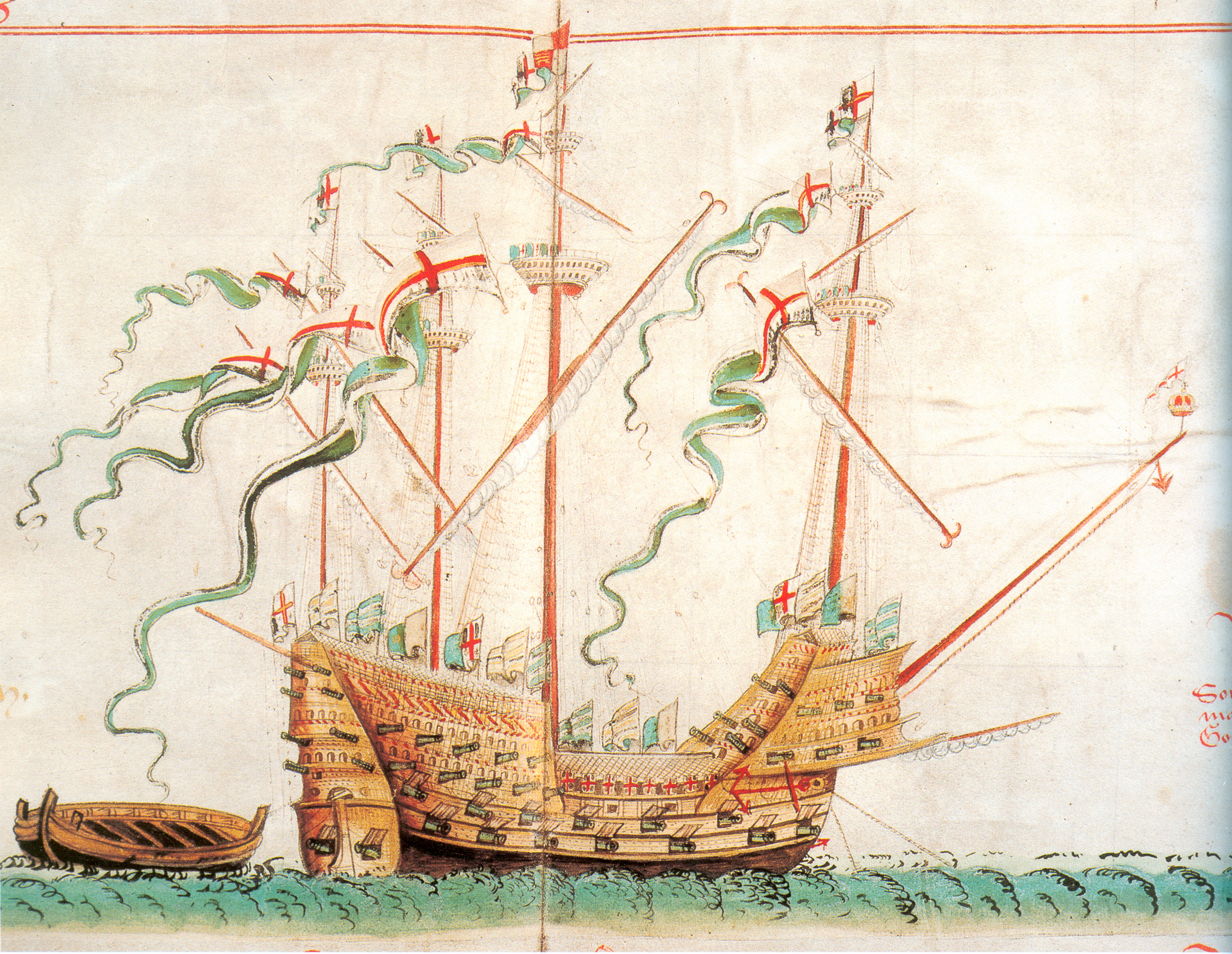
The Henry Grace a Dieu

== Early life and career ==
Thomas Pert (as his name was at times recorded) or Spert was born in England. He entered the service of Henry VII as a mariner, carrying dispatches between England and Spain.

Spert served, evidently with credit, in the navy of Henry VIII during the Anglo-French War of 1512–1514. From 1512 to 1515, he was master of the Mary Rose, one of the most important warships in the Crown's fleet. On 10 November 1514, Spert was granted an annuity of £20, which was confirmed in January 1516.

He next was assigned as master to the Henry Grace a Dieu, the largest vessel constructed up to then in England. On 10 July 1517, Spert was granted the office of ballasting ships in the Thames River, which office he was to hold 'during pleasure' at a fee of £10 a year. Historian James A. Williamson in his work of 1913 thought this fact aided an argument against Richard Eden's statement that Spert's misconduct had spoiled the success of the 1516-1517 voyage of discovery undertaken with Sebastian Cabot. Williamson said that the ballasting office apparently provided opportunity for profit, and would not have been granted to a man who had recently disgraced himself.

A document in the Public Record Office is found in a manuscript book showing the issues of various stores to the masters of the king's ships. Entries detail Spert's presence on the Henry Grace a Dieu on 7 April and 5 July 1516, and on 28 April and 17 September 1517. Together with the grant made to him on 10 July 1517, Williamson argued that these appear to be conclusive evidence that Spert was not traveling with Sebastian Cabot in a voyage of discovery in 1516–1517 to the southern coast of North America.

What is known of the remainder of Spert's career shows that he continued in high favour with the king. He served in the war of 1522-5 and was consulted by the admiral as to the best way of cutting out some Scottish privateers in Boulogne harbour. In 1524 he was appointed Clerk Comptroller of the Navy, a financial office which he held until 1540. Between 1538 and 1540 he held the office of Captain of Portsmouth, by which he was responsible for maintaining and rebuilding the fortifications of Portsmouth.

He was knighted in (or soon after) 1535. His knighthood has been disputed by historians, but Williamson notes two official documents that refer to him as Sir Thomas Spert (Letters and Papers, vi, No. 196; xvii, No. 1258).

Spert made his will 28 November 1541, naming his wife Mary (Fabian) as executrix, and died at Stepney in December. According to Baldwin, his monument at St Dunstan and All Saints, Stepney, is in error in stating that he died on 8 September 1541. He left his pasturage in Blackwall to his widow until his son Richard reached the age of majority. He also made bequests to his daughter and to his cousin Margaret Spert, who was married to 'the famous Guinea seaman, John Lok'.

== Marriages and issue ==
Spert married a woman named Margery, whose surname is unknown. He married as his second wife Anne Salkell, but appears to have had no children by either marriage.

He married thirdly Mary Fabian, the daughter of John Fabian (nephew of the chronicler, Robert Fabyan) and Anne Waldegrave. They had two children. Their son Richard Spert married Grissell Salkell of King's Wood, Wiltshire. Their daughter Anne Spert married firstly Thomas Brook, and secondly John Skott.

== Legacy and honors ==
Spert Island off the coast of Antarctica is named for him.
