= Edward Nicholas Kendall =

British explorer and hydrographer

- Born: October 1800 probably England
- Died: 12 February 1845 (aged 44); Southampton, England
- Military career
- Allegiance: United Kingdom
- Branch: Royal Navy
- Service years: 1831–1841
- Rank: Lieutenant

Edward Nicholas Kendall, R.N. (October 1800 – 12 February 1845) was an English hydrographer, an officer in the Royal Navy, and polar explorer. During one of his Arctic expeditions, Kendall became the first known European to sight Wollaston Land.

== Early years ==
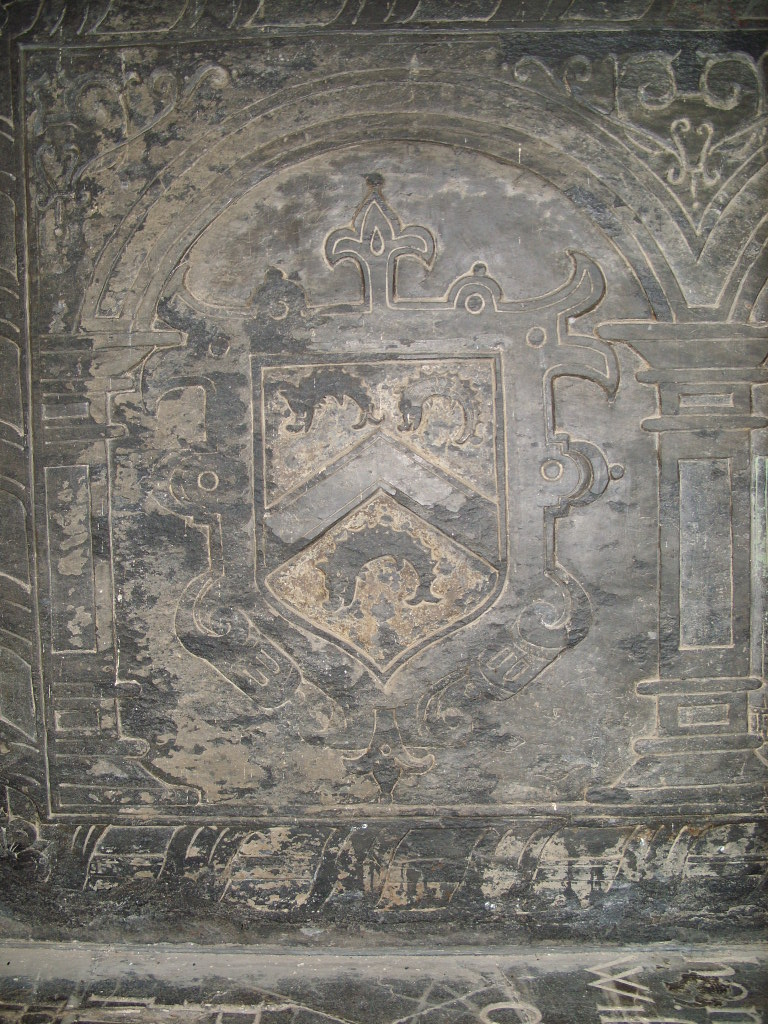
Coat of arms of the Kendall family of Pelyn in Cornwall.

He was born in 1800, probably in England. His father was the naval captain Edward Kendall. The family were natives of Cornwall, descending from the Kendalls of Pelyn, near Lostwithiel, who for many generations past had been active in the politics of Cornwall and England. It has been remarked of this family, that they have perhaps sent more members to the House of Lords than any other in the United Kingdom. His mother was Mary Champion Hicks (born ca. 1775). Mary's father was Admiral Thomas Hicks, of Maisonette, Stoke Gabriel, Devon.

Kendall had three younger siblings: William Kendall, Mary Kendall, and Amelia Kendall.

After receiving his education at the Royal Naval College in Portsmouth, he entered the Royal Navy in 1814.

== Career ==
Kendall's career began as a midshipman on board HMS Mutine. While serving on HMS Erne that wrecked in 1819 on the Isle of Sal, Cape Verde, he sustained injuries. He served on other ships, usually as a surveyor, including the trigonometrical survey in Orkney, Shetland, the coast of Ireland, and in the North Sea. In 1824, he volunteered his services for William Edward Parry's third expedition to find the Northwest Passage, serving as assistant surveyor under George Francis Lyon aboard HMS Griper. From 1825 to 1827, Kendall served on the Mackenzie River expedition, this time with John Franklin, exploring the Mackenzie River Delta as an assistant surveyor under the naturalist John Richardson. During this expedition, he became the first known European to sight Wollaston Land (actually a peninsula), and travelled from Fort Franklin to York Factory. In 1827, he was commissioned lieutenant.

The following year, at the recommendation of the Royal Geographical Society, Kendall travelled aboard HMS Chanticleer during its scientific voyage, assisting in pendulum experiments, and other research including the South Shetland Islands region of the Antarctic where again he conducted surveys. In 1830, he transferred to HMS Hecla to survey the West Africa coast, returning to England later that year. It was then that he became employed by the Secretary of State for War and the Colonies for the Colonial Office in a secret and confidential survey of the boundary line of the British and American states, in New Brunswick. After conducting other surveys in New Brunswick, he worked on compiling a map of it in 1831. Though there were requests for promotion thereafter, Kendall remained a lieutenant.

Approximately two years later, Kendall became involved in the New Brunswick and Nova Scotia Land Company, becoming its commissioner at Fredericton. He returned to Britain by 1838. During his later years, he served first as superintendent of the West India Mail Steam Navigation Company, and second as superintendent of the Peninsular and Oriental Steam Packet Company in Southampton.

== Personal life ==
He had four children by prior issue: Edward Kay Kendall, Franklin Richardson Kendall, Robert Sinclair Kendall, and Mary Anne Kendall. His descendants include the Canadian rock musician and composer Simon Kendall and Canadian basketball player Levon Kendall.

In 1832, he married Franklin's niece. Mary Anne Kay was the daughter of Joseph Kay, a London architect. Her mother was Sarah Henrietta Porden, sister of Eleanor Anne Porden, Franklin's first wife.

Kendall died in 1845 in Southampton, England, and was buried at Carisbrooke on the Isle of Wight.

His papers are in the archives of the Royal Geographical Society in London.

== Legacy ==
Kendall Island in the Mackenzie Delta, and Cape Kendall in view of the Coppermine River, were named in honour of Kendall by Franklin. Kendall Rocks, the southwest group of rocks in the Palmer Archipelago, are also named after Kendall.

== Partial works ==
- (1842). Remarks on steam communication between England and Australasia: As combined with a system of weekly communication between the colonies of Australasia.

== See also ==
Robert Hood (explorer)
George Back
