= Spert Island =

Island in Antarctica

- Location of Spert Island

- Location within Antarctic Peninsula Location within Antarctica

Geography
- Location: Antarctica
- Coordinates: 63°51′S 60°57′W
- Archipelago: Palmer Archipelago

Administration
- Administered under the Antarctic Treaty System

Demographics
- Population: Uninhabited

Spert Island is an island lying off the west extremity of Trinity Island, in the Palmer Archipelago of Antarctica. Charted by the Swedish Antarctic Expedition under Nordenskjold, 1901–04. Named by the United Kingdom Antarctic Place-Names Committee (UK-APC) in 1960 for Sir Thomas Spert, Controller of the King's Ships in the time of Henry VIII, founder and first Master of the Mariners of England, which later became the Corporation of Trinity House.

== See also ==
- Composite Antarctic Gazetteer
- List of Antarctic and sub-Antarctic islands
- List of Antarctic islands south of 60° S
- SCAR
- Territorial claims in Antarctica
