= Kurilo Point =

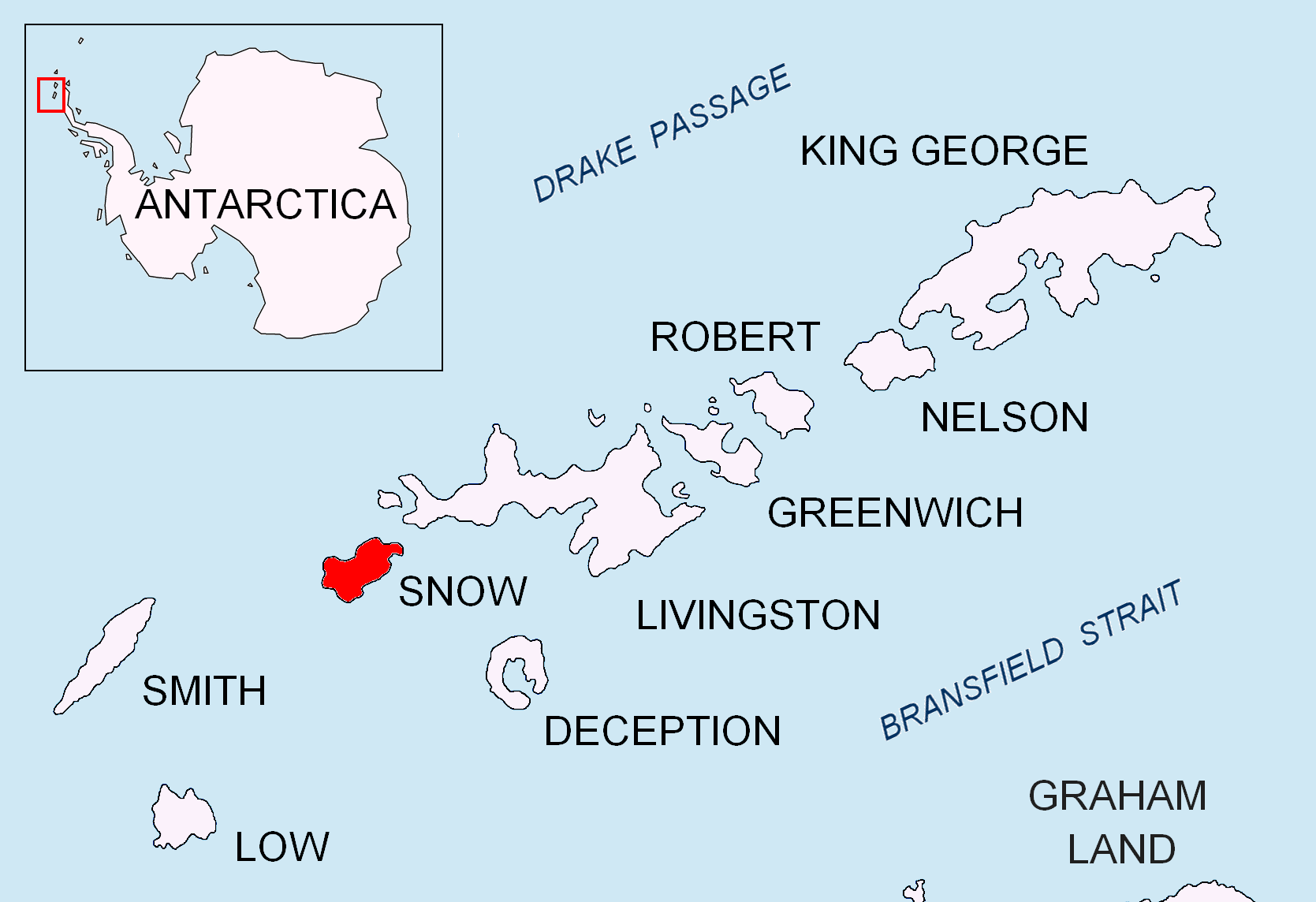
Location of Snow Island in the South Shetland Islands.

Topographic map of Livingston Island, Greenwich, Robert, Snow and Smith Islands.

Kurilo Point (Bulgarian: нос Курило, ‘Nos Kurilo’ \'nos ku-'ri-lo\) is a sharp ice-free point on the southeast coast of Snow Island in the South Shetland Islands, Antarctica projecting 200 m into Bransfield Strait. Situated 3.1 km southwest of President Head and 2.3 km north of Hall Peninsula.

The point is named after the settlement of Kurilo in western Bulgaria.

== Location ==
Kurilo Point is located at 62°44′40″S 61°14′39″W. Bulgarian mapping in 2009.

== Map ==
- L.L. Ivanov. Antarctica: Livingston Island and Greenwich, Robert, Snow and Smith Islands. Scale 1:120000 topographic map. Troyan: Manfred Wörner Foundation, 2009. ISBN 978-954-92032-6-4
