= Kapkan =

Kapakan may refer to:

- Kapakan, Razavi Khorasan, a village in Iran
- Kabagan Rural District, district in Iran that may also be written as "Kapkan"
  - Kapakan, Bushehr, a village in that district
- Kapakan, Perm Krai, a village in Russia
- Kabagan, Lorestan, a village in Iran that may also be written as "Kapkan"
- Maxim "Kapakan" Basuda, a fictional character in the video game Rainbow Six Siege
- Kapakan also known as a dance of capoeira
