= Mount Morley =

Mountain on Alexander Island, Antarctica

Mount Morley (69°40′S 71°28′W) is a mountain rising to about 1,550 metres (5,100 ft) in the southern part of the Lassus Mountains, in northwestern Alexander Island, Antarctica. It was first mapped from air photos taken by the Ronne Antarctic Research Expedition in 1947–48 by D. Searle of the Falkland Islands Dependencies Survey in 1960, and was named by the UK Antarctic Place-Names Committee after the English composer Thomas Morley.
