= Kendall Rocks =

Group of rocks in the Palmer Archipelago, Antarctica

The Kendall Rocks (63°30′S 59°49′W) are a group of pillar-shaped rocks, lying 3 nautical miles (6 km) north of Tower Island in the Palmer Archipelago, Antarctica. The name "Kendall Group" appears northwest of this position on a chart based upon work by a British expedition under Commander Henry Foster, Royal Navy, 1828–31, but it was later found that no islands exist there. The name Kendall Rocks has subsequently been applied to these pillar-shaped rocks discovered in 1838 by a French expedition under Captain Jules Dumont d'Urville. They are named for Lieutenant E.N. Kendall of Foster's expedition ship, the Chanticleer.
