= Tower Island =

Island in Palmer Archipelago, Antarctica

- Location of Tower Island within Palmer Archipelago

- Location in Antarctica

Geography
- Location: Antarctica
- Coordinates: 63°34′S 059°50′W
- Archipelago: Palmer Archipelago
- Length: 9 km (5.6 mi)
- Highest elevation: 305 m (1001 ft)

Administration
- Administered under the Antarctic Treaty System

Demographics
- Population: Uninhabited

Tower Island is an Antarctic island 9 kilometres (5 nmi) long and 305 m (1,001 ft) high. It marks the north-east extent of Palmer Archipelago. It lies 37 kilometres (20 nmi) north-east of Trinity Island, separated by Gilbert Strait. Both islands are separated from the Davis Coast to the south by Orléans Strait, running northeast–southwest. The Pearl Rocks lie off the West Coast of Tower Island.

The island was named on 30 January 1820 by Edward Bransfield, Master, Royal Navy, who described it as a round island.

== Named features ==
A number of features on Tower Island have been charted and named by various Antarctic expeditions. The following description of features begins from the north and proceeds clockwise along the coast to the east.

== East coast ==
The northernmost point of the island is called Cape Leguillou. It was charted by a French expedition under Captain Jules Dumont d'Urville, 1837–40, and named by him after Élie Le Guillou, a surgeon on the expedition corvette Zélée. The name has been consistently used since that time. Ploski Cove (Bulgarian: залив Плоски, ‘Zaliv Ploski’ \'za-liv 'plo-ski\), named after the village of Ploski in Bulgaria, is located to the east of the cape. It is 1 km-wide (0.54 nmi) and indents the coast by 850 m (2,790 ft). Traverso Point forms the coast's southeastern edge.

Harmanli Cove (Bulgarian: залив Харманли, romanized: zaliv Harmanli, IPA: [ˈzalif ˈxarmɐnli]) is a 1.1 km-wide (0.59 nmi) cove on the eastern cove of Tower Island. It indents the coast to a depth of 1.1 km (0.59 nmi). The cove is named after the town of Harmanli in southeastern Bulgaria. To the south is Cape Dumoutier, the eastern tip of Tower Island. It was named by d'Urville's expedition for Pierre Dumoutier, a surgeon with the expedition. Continuing south is Breste Cove, which is 700 m (2,300 ft) wide and 850 m (2,790 ft) deep. It is named for the settlement of Breste in northern Bulgaria. South of that is Castillo Point.

Condyle Point is the southeast point of the island. It was named by the UK Antarctic Place-Names Committee (UK-APC). The name is descriptive of the shape of this feature: a condyle is the rounded prominence at the end of a bone.

The southernmost point of the island is Peña Point.

== West coast ==
Ustina Point (Bulgarian: нос Устина, 'Nos Ustina' \'nos 'us-ti-na\) is a rocky point on the island's west coast. The point is named after the settlement of Ustina in southern Bulgaria. It is situated 2.6 km northwest of Peña Point.

Closer to the north end of the island, Kranevo Point (Bulgarian: нос Кранево, ‘Nos Kranevo’ \'nos 'kra-ne-vo\), named for the Bulgarian village of Kranevo, forms the south side of the entrance to Mindya Cove. Mindya Cove, named for Mindya, Bulgaria, is 2.4 km-wide (1.3 nmi) cove indenting the island's northwest coast for 1.5 km (0.81 nmi).

== Coastal rock groups ==
- Dumoulin Rocks
- Kendall Rocks
- Pearl Rocks

== See also ==
- Composite Antarctic Gazetteer
- List of Antarctic and sub-Antarctic islands
- List of Antarctic islands south of 60° S
- Scientific Committee on Antarctic Research
- Territorial claims in Antarctica
