= Lanchester Bay =

Bay in Antarctica

- Location within Antarctica
- Coordinates: 63°55′S 60°6′W

Lanchester Bay (63°55′S 60°6′W) is a bay 7 nautical miles (13 km; 8.1 mi) wide lying east of Havilland Point, along the west coast of Graham Land, Antarctica.

== Location ==
Davis Coast, Antarctic Peninsula. Curtiss Bay at the southwest end

Lanchester Bay is on the Davis Coast on the west side of the Antarctic Peninsula. It opens onto Orléans Strait to the northwest. Wright Ice Piedmont is to the southwest, the Detroit Plateau to the southeast and Sabine Glacier to the northeast.

== Mapping and name ==
Lanchester Bay was photographed by Hunting Aerosurveys in 1955–57 and mapped from these photos by the Falkland Islands Dependencies Survey (FIDS). It was named by the UK Antarctic Place-Names Committee (UK-APC) in 1960 for Frederick W. Lanchester (1868-1946), an aeronautical engineer who laid the foundations of modern airfoil theory.

== Features ==
Features and nearby features, from south to north, include:

=== Ezdimir Buttress ===
64°03′05″S 59°47′40″W An ice-covered buttress rising to 1,719 metres (5,640 ft) high on the northwest side of Detroit Plateau on Davis Coast in Graham Land. Situated between tributaries to Temple Glacier, 7.54 kilometres (4.69 mi) south of Mount Bris. Steep and partly ice-free SW, northwest and northeast slopes. Named after Ezdimir Mountain in Western Bulgaria.

=== Temple Glacier ===
64°00′S 60°01′W. Glacier flowing into the south side of Lanchester Bay. Photographed by Hunting Aerosurveys Ltd. in 1955-57 and mapped from these photos by the FIDS. Named by the UK-APC in 1960 for Félix du Temple de la Croix (1823-90), French naval officer who in 1857 designed the first powered model airplane to rise unaided, fly freely and land safely.

=== Volov Peak ===
63°59′06″S 59°55′53″W A rocky peak rising to 1,202 metres (3,944 ft) high at the southwest extremity of Korten Ridge. Situated 16.6 kilometres (10.3 mi) southeast of Havilland Point, 1.84 kilometres (1.14 mi) south-southwest of Chubra Peak and 5.5 kilometres (3.4 mi) west of Mount Bris. Surmounting Temple Glacier to the SW. Named after Panayot Volov (1850-1876), a leader of the April Uprising of 1876 for Bulgarian independence.

=== Mount Bris ===
63°59′S 59°50′W. A broad mountain rising 1 nautical mile (1.9 km; 1.2 mi) west of the head of Sabine Glacier and 11 nautical miles (20 km; 13 mi) south of Cape Kater. Named by UK-APC for Jean Marie Le Bris (1808–72), French naval officer who designed a glider and became the first glider pilot, in 1857.

=== Chubra Peak ===
63°58′13″S 59°54′52″W A peak rising to 1,541 metres (5,056 ft) high east of Temple Glacier and south of Kasabova Glacier. Situated 2.6 kilometres (1.6 mi) southeast of the head of Lanchester Bay, 6.9 kilometres (4.3 mi) south-southeast of Milkov Point and 6.1 kilometres (3.8 mi) southwest of Sredorek Peak. Named after the settlement of Chubra in Eastern Bulgaria.

=== Kasabova Glacier ===
63°56′20″S 59°54′30″W A 6 kilometres (3.7 mi) long and 3.5 kilometres (2.2 mi) wide glacier on Davis Coast. Draining northwestwards, and turning south of Chanute Peak to flow westwards into Orléans Strait at the head of Lanchester Bay. Named for the Bulgarian pioneer of aviation Rayna Kasabova (1897-1957), a volunteer in the First Balkan War who became the first woman to take part in a combat air mission on October 30, 1912.

=== Korten Ridge ===
63°55′40″S 59°52′50″W A ridge extending 18 kilometres (11 mi) in south–north direction and 9 kilometres (5.6 mi) wide, rising to 1,864 metres (6,115 ft) high (Mount Bris) . Bounded by Podvis Col linking it to Detroit Plateau to the southeast, Temple Glacier to the southwest. Lanchester Bay to the west, Wennersgaard Point and Jordanoff Bay to the north, and Sabine Glacier to the east. Named after the settlement of Korten in Southeastern Bulgaria.

=== Chanute Peak ===
63°56′S 59°58′W. A peak on the east side of Lanchester Bay, 4 nautical miles (7.4 km; 4.6 mi) south of Wennersgaard Point. Named by UK-APC for Octave Chanute (1832-1910), American designer of gliders who first introduced moveable planes for the purpose of control and stability, 1896-97.

=== Milkov Point ===
63°55′07″S 59°59′29″W A conspicuous rocky point on the east side of Lanchester Bay formed by an offshoot of Chanute Peak. Situated 11.5 kilometres (7.1 mi) east of Havilland Point and 8.5 kilometres (5.3 mi) south-southwest of Wennersgaard Point. Named for the Bulgarian pioneer of aviation Radul Milkov (1883-1962) who, while on a joint combat air mission with Prodan Tarakchiev during the First Balkan War, used the first air-dropped bombs on October 16, 1912.

=== Bankya Peak ===
63°53′19″S 59°53′23″W A peak rising to 877 metres (2,877 ft) high east of Lanchester Bay and west of Sabine Glacier. Situated 5.28 kilometres (3.28 mi) south-southeast of Wennersgaard Point, 6 kilometres (3.7 mi) northeast of Milkov Point, 4.36 kilometres (2.71 mi) north of Chanute Peak and 6.55 kilometres (4.07 mi) west-northwest of Velichkov Knoll. Named after the town of Bankya in Western Bulgaria.

=== Sratsimir Hill ===
63°51′51″S 59°54′04″W A hill rising to 720 metres (2,360 ft) high at the north extremity of Korten Ridge. Situated 8.23 kilometres (5.11 mi) north-northwest of Sredorek Peak, 2.78 kilometres (1.73 mi) north by west of Bankya Peak, 2.84 kilometres (1.76 mi) southeast of Wennersgaard Point and 7.83 kilometres (4.87 mi) northwest of Velichkov Knoll. Named after the settlement of Sratsimir in Northeastern Bulgaria, in association with the Bulgarian ruler Tsar Ivan Sratsimir, 1356-1396.

=== Wennersgaard Point ===
63°51′S 59°54′W. A point forming the east side of the entrance to Lanchester Bay. First charted by the SwedAE in November–December 1902 and named after Ole C. Wennersgaard, a seaman of the expedition who died while wintering on Paulet Island in 1903.

== Sources ==
- Alberts, Fred G., ed. (1995), Geographic Names of the Antarctic (PDF) (2 ed.), United States Board on Geographic Names This article incorporates public domain material from websites or documents of the United States Board on Geographic Names.

REMA Explorer
The Reference Elevation Model of Antarctica (REMA) gives ice surface measurements of most of the continent. When a feature is ice-covered, the ice surface will differ from the underlying rock surface and will change over time. To see ice surface contours and elevation of a feature as of the last REMA update,
- Open the Antarctic REMA Explorer
- Enter the feature's coordinates in the box at the top left that says "Find address or place", then press enter
  The coordinates should be in DMS format, e.g. 65°05'03"S 64°01'02"W. If you only have degrees and minutes, you may not be able to locate the feature.
- Hover over the icons at the left of the screen
- Find "Hillshade" and click on that
  In the bottom right of the screen, set "Shading Factor" to 0 to get a clearer image
- Find "Contour" and click on that
  In the "Contour properties" box, select Contour Interval = 1m
  You can zoom in and out to see the ice surface contours of the feature and nearby features
- Find "Identify" and click on that
  Click the point where the contour lines seem to indicate the top of the feature
  The "Identify" box will appear to the top left. The Orthometric height is the elevation of the ice surface of the feature at this point.

- Antarctic REMA Explorer (Digital Elevation Models created by the Polar Geospatial Center from Maxar imagery), Polar Geospatial Center, University of Minnesota, 2019
- "Bankya Peak", Composite Gazetteer of Antarctica, Scientific Committee on Antarctic Research
- "Chubra Peak", Composite Gazetteer of Antarctica, Scientific Committee on Antarctic Research
- "Ezdimir Buttress", Composite Gazetteer of Antarctica, Scientific Committee on Antarctic Research
- Graham Land and South Shetland Islands, BAS: British Antarctic Survey, 2005
- "Kasabova Glacier", Composite Gazetteer of Antarctica, Scientific Committee on Antarctic Research
- "Korten Ridge", Composite Gazetteer of Antarctica, Scientific Committee on Antarctic Research
- "Milkov Point", Composite Gazetteer of Antarctica, Scientific Committee on Antarctic Research
- "Sratsimir Hill", Composite Gazetteer of Antarctica, Scientific Committee on Antarctic Research
- "Volov Peak", Composite Gazetteer of Antarctica, Scientific Committee on Antarctic Research
