= Ketripor Hill =

Hill in Antarctica

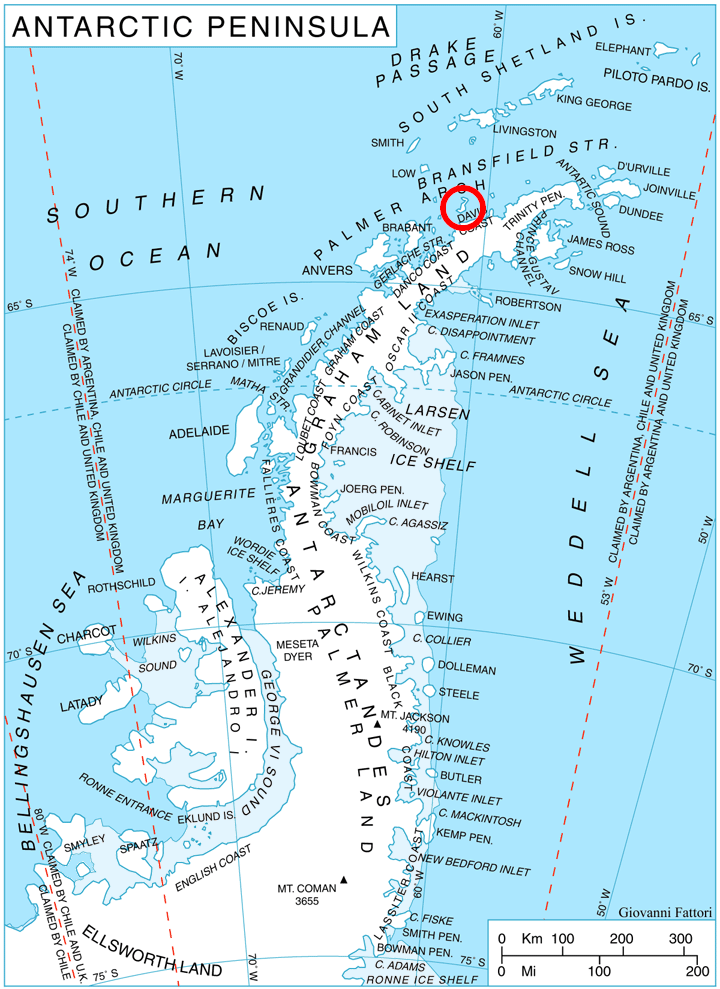
Location of Trinity Island in the Antarctic Peninsula region

Ketripor Hill (Bulgarian: хълм Кетрипор, ‘Halm Ketripor’ \'h&lm 'ke-tri-por\) is the ice-covered hill rising to 962 m in northwestern Trinity Island in the Palmer Archipelago, Antarctica. It surmounts Saldobisa Cove to the northwest and Olusha Cove to the southwest, and has steep and partly ice-free north and east slopes. The hill is named after the Thracian King Ketripor, 352-347 BC.

== Location ==
Ketripor Hill is located at 63°41′45″S 60°46′07″W. British mapping in 1978.

== Maps ==
- British Antarctic Territory. Scale 1:200000 topographic map. DOS 610 – W 63 60. Tolworth, UK, 1978.
- Antarctic Digital Database (ADD). Scale 1:250000 topographic map of Antarctica. Scientific Committee on Antarctic Research (SCAR). Since 1993, regularly upgraded and updated.
