= Kamenar (surname) =

Kamenar is a surname of multiple origins. Kamenar is a Croatian form. Czech spelling: Kamenář, Slovak spelling Kamenár (feminine: Kamenárová). It is an occupational surname derived from occupations related to handling stones: gem cutter, stonemason, quarry stone cutter, from the word kamen, 'stone'. Notable people with the surname include:

- Jan Kamenář (1875–1952), Moravian educator, translator, and publicist
- Karlo Kamenar (born 1994), Croatian footballer
- Ľuboš Kamenár (born 1987), Slovak footballer
