= Charcot Bay =

Bay in Graham Land, Antarctica

- Location within Antarctica
- Coordinates: 63°48′S 59°35′W
- Type: Bay

Charcot Bay (63°48′S 59°35′W) is a bay about 10 nautical miles (19 km; 12 mi) wide between Cape Kater and Cape Kjellman along the Davis Coast of Graham Land, Antarctica.

== Location ==
Trinity Peninsula, Antarctic Peninsula. Schmidt Peninsula towards northeast end

Charcot Bay lies at the east end of the Davis Coast on the northwest of the Antarctic Peninsula, at the base of the Trinity Peninsula. It is southwest of Gavin Ice Piedmont and Bone Bay and northeast of Lanchester Bay. It opens onto the Canal d'Orléans, which separates it from Tower Island and the Palmer Archipelago. The Whittle Peninsula forms the western side of the bay. The Detroit Plateau is to the east. Glaciers entering the bay include, from west to east, Sabine Glacier, Andrew Glacier, Whitecloud Glacier and McNeile Glacier. Coastal features include Wbster Peaks, Almond Point, Lindblad Cove, Auster Point and Cape Kjellman.

== Discovery and name ==
Charcot Bay was discovered by the Swedish Antarctic Expedition (SwedAE), 1901–04, under Otto Nordenskiöld. He named it for Dr. Jean-Baptiste Charcot, at that time a noted Arctic explorer preparing for his first Antarctic expedition, on which he planned to look for Otto Nordenskiöld whose return was overdue.

== Glaciers ==
=== Andrew Glacier ===
63°53′S 59°40′W. A glacier 3 nautical miles (5.6 km; 3.5 mi) long, flowing northeast into Charcot Bay immediately west of Webster Peaks. Charted in 1948 by the Falkland Islands Dependencies Survey (FIDS) who named the feature for Doctor J.D. Andrew, medical officer at the FIDS Hope Bay station in 1946-47.

=== Whitecloud Glacier ===
63°55′S 59°32′W. A glacier which flows northward to discharge into Charcot Bay just west of Almond Point. Named by the UK Antarctic Place-Names Committee (UK-APC) in 1960. The name is descriptive of cloud conditions that prevailed at the time of FIDS survey of the area in 1948.

=== McNeile Glacier ===
63°54′S 59°26′W. A glacier flowing northward to the southeast side of Almond Point where it enters Charcot Bay. Charted in 1948 by the FIDS and named for S.St.C. McNeile, surveyor at the FIDS Hope Bay base in 1948–49.

== Whittle Peninsula ==
63°49′S 59°48′W. A peninsula, 5 nautical miles (9.3 km; 5.8 mi) long, terminating in Cape Kater and forming the west limit of Charcot Bay. Surveyed by the SwedAE in .December 1902. Named in 1977 by the UK-APC after Sir Frank Whittle, Air Commodore, RAF, British pioneer of gas turbines for jet propulsion of aircraft from 1937.

=== Cape Kater ===
63°46′S 59°54′W. A cape fringed by rocks, marking the west side of the entrance to Charcot Bay on the west coast of Graham Land. This coast was sketched by a British expedition 1828-31, under Henry Foster, who named a cape in this region after Captain Henry Kater, a member of the committee which planned the expedition. This region was more fully mapped by the SwedAE, 1901–04, under Otto Nordenskiöld, who gave the name Cape Gunnar to this cape. The name Kater perpetuates the earlier naming.

=== Kater Rocks ===
63°46′S 59°53′W. A small cluster of rocks lying 1 nautical mile (1.9 km; 1.2 mi) northwest of Cape Kater, Graham Land. The rocks were first charted and named by the Swedish Antarctic Expedition, 1901–04, under Otto Nordenskiöld.

=== Radibosh Point ===
63°46′12″S 59°47′30″W A point forming the northeast extremity of Whittle Peninsula. Situated 2.8 kilometres (1.7 mi) east of Cape Kater, 6.08 kilometres (3.78 mi) northeast of Tarakchiev Point, 12.65 kilometres (7.86 mi) north-northwest of Nikyup Point and 19.2 kilometres (11.9 mi) west of Cape Kjellman. Named after the settlement of Radibosh in Western Bulgaria.

== Other coastal features ==
Coastal features east of the Whittle Peninsula, from southwest to northeast, include:

=== Nikyup Point ===
63°51′52″S 59°38′55″W A point next east of the Andrew Glacier terminus. It is situated 12.65 kilometres (7.86 mi) south-southeast of Radibosh Point, 6.3 kilometres (3.9 mi) northeast of Velichkov Knoll, 6.76 kilometres (4.20 mi) west of Almond Point and 19.2 kilometres (11.9 mi) southwest of Cape Kjellman. Its shape was enhanced as a result of Andrew Glacier's retreat in the late 20th and early 21st century. It is named after the settlement of Nikyup in Northern Bulgaria.

=== Ognen Cove ===
63°52′15″S 59°40′45″W A 2.8 kilometres (1.7 mi) wide cove indenting for 1.55 kilometres (0.96 mi) the northwest coast of Trinity Peninsula. It is part of Charcot Bay, entered west of Nikyup Point. It was formed as a result of the retreat of Andrew Glacier in the second half of 20th century. It was named after the settlement of Ognen in Southeastern Bulgaria.

=== Almond Point ===
63°53′S 59°30′W. A rocky point between Whitecloud Glacier and McNeile Glacier at the head of Charcot Bay. It was charted in 1948 by the FIDS who applied the name because of the distinctive shape of the point.

=== Lindblad Cove ===
63.85°S 59.45°W Cove, 5 kilometres (3.1 mi) wide, between Almond Point and Auster Point in Charcot Bay, Trinity Peninsula. It was named by the Advisory Committee on Antarctic Names (US-ACAN) in 1995 in commemoration of Lars-Eric Lindblad (1927–94), pioneer in Antarctic tourism. A noted conservationist, Mr. Lindblad operated the first cruise to Antarctica in 1966 and was a leader in the concept of expedition tourism as a means of environmental awareness.

=== Auster Point ===
63°49′S 59°28′W. A point midway along the east shore of Charcot Bay. It was named by UK-APC after the Auster aircraft used by British expeditions in this area.

=== Slomer Cove ===
63°46′40″S 59°24′00″W An 11.2 kilometres (7.0 mi) wide cove indenting for 5.9 kilometres (3.7 mi) the northwest coast of Trinity Peninsula, south of Cape Kjellman and north of Auster Point. It was named after the settlement of Slomer in Northern Bulgaria.

=== Cape Kjellman ===
63°44′S 59°24′W. A cape marking the east side of the entrance to Charcot Bay. First charted by the SwedAE, 1901–04, under Otto Nordenskiöld, and named by him probably for Professor Frans Reinhold Kjellman, Swedish botanist.

== Inland features ==
Inland features, from west to east, include

=== Velichkov Knoll ===
63°53′41″S 59°45′27″W A peak rising to 1,006 metres (3,301 ft) high east of Sabine Glacier and west of Andrew Glacier. Situated 6.55 kilometres (4.07 mi) east-southeast of Bankya Peak, 5.25 kilometres (3.26 mi) northeast of Sredorek Peak and 6.3 kilometres (3.9 mi) southwest of Nikyup Point. It was named after the Bulgarian aviation pioneer Stoyan Velichkov (b. 1871) who constructed the first air dropped bomb "Velichka|used in the First Balkan War in 1912.

=== Webster Peaks ===
63°55′S 59°40′W. Group of four rocky peaks, 1,065 metres (3,494 ft) high, standing west of Whitecloud Glacier at the head of Charcot Bay. Charted by the FIDS in 1948, and named for W.H.B. Webster, medical officer and naturalist on the Chanticleer, which approached Tower and Trinity Islands off this coast in 1829.

=== Dragor Hill ===
63°54′20″S 59°30′57″W A hill rising to 767 metres (2,516 ft) high east of Whitecloud Glacier. Situated 7.85 kilometres (4.88 mi) southeast of Nikyup Point, 2.85 kilometres (1.77 mi) south of Almond Point and 1.85 kilometres (1.15 mi) west-northwest of Borovan Knoll. It was named after the settlement of Dragor in Southern Bulgaria.

=== Borovan Knoll ===
63°54′39″S 59°28′49″W A hill rising to 938 metres (3,077 ft) high on the west coast of Lindblad Cove on Trinity Peninsula, Antarctic Peninsula. Situated 1.85 kilometres (1.15 mi) east-southeast of Dragor Hill and 3.88 kilometres (2.41 mi) south-southeast of Almond Point, which is formed by an offshoot of the hill. It was named after the settlement of Borovan in Northwestern Bulgaria.

=== Klokotnitsa Ridge ===
63°57′55″S 59°27′25″W A rounded ice-covered ridge extending 12 kilometres (7.5 mi) in north–south direction, 4 kilometres (2.5 mi) wide and rising to 1,600 metres (5,200 ft). Situated on the northwest side of Detroit Plateau, 28.8 kilometres (17.9 mi) southeast of Cape Kater and 26.7 kilometres (16.6 mi) south of Cape Kjelman. Two northerly offshoots of the ridge form Dragor Hill and Borovan Knoll. Steep and partly ice-free W, north and east slopes. It surmounts Whitecloud Glacier to the west and McNeile Glacier to the east. It was named after the settlement of Klokotnitsa in Southern Bulgaria.

== Sources ==
- Alberts, Fred G., ed. (1995), Geographic Names of the Antarctic (PDF) (2 ed.), United States Board on Geographic Names This article incorporates public domain material from websites or documents of the United States Board on Geographic Names.
- "Borovan Knoll", Composite Gazetteer of Antarctica, Scientific Committee on Antarctic Research
- "Dragor Hill", Composite Gazetteer of Antarctica, Scientific Committee on Antarctic Research
- Graham Land and South Shetland Islands, BAS: British Antarctic Survey, 2005
- "Klokotnitsa Ridge", Composite Gazetteer of Antarctica, Scientific Committee on Antarctic Research
- "Lindblad Cove", Geographic Names Information System, United States Geological Survey, United States Department of the Interior
- "Nikyup Point", Composite Gazetteer of Antarctica, Scientific Committee on Antarctic Research
- "Ognen Cove", Composite Gazetteer of Antarctica, Scientific Committee on Antarctic Research
- "Radibosh Point", Composite Gazetteer of Antarctica, Scientific Committee on Antarctic Research
- "Slomer Cove", Composite Gazetteer of Antarctica, Scientific Committee on Antarctic Research
- Trinity Peninsula (PDF) (Scale 1:250000 topographic map No. 5697), Institut für Angewandte Geodäsie and British Antarctic Survey, 1996, archived from the original (PDF) on 23 September 2015
- "Velichkov Knoll", Composite Gazetteer of Antarctica, Scientific Committee on Antarctic Research

This article incorporates public domain material from websites or documents of the United States Geological Survey.
