= Kapka Lake =

Antarctic lake

Location of Elephant Island in the South Shetland Islands

Map of Elephant Island

Kapka Lake (Bulgarian: езеро Капката, romanized: ezero Kapkata, IPA: ['ɛzɛro 'kapkɐtɐ]) is the 125 m long in southwest–northeast direction and 76 m wide lake on the south coast of Elephant Island in the South Shetland Islands. It has a surface area of 0.32 ha and is separated from the waters of Mendoza Cove by a 20 to 50 m wide strip of land. The area was visited by early 19th century sealers.

The feature is so named because of its shape supposedly resembling a drop ('kapka' in Bulgarian).

== Location ==
Kapka Lake is centred at 61°09′19.8″S 54°51′10″W, which is 8.25 km west of Walker Point. British mapping of the area in 1822,1972 and 2009.

== Maps ==
- Chart of South Shetland including Coronation Island, &c. from the exploration of the sloop Dove in the years 1821 and 1822 by George Powell Commander of the same. Scale ca. 1:200000. London: Laurie, 1822
- Elephant Island: From a survey by the Joint Services Expedition, December 1970. Scale 1:132000 topographic map. Royal Geographical Society (UK), 1972
- British Antarctic Territory. Scale 1:200000 topographic map. DOS 610 Series, Sheet W 61 54. Directorate of Overseas Surveys, Tolworth, UK, 1972
- South Shetland Islands: Elephant, Clarence and Gibbs Islands. Scale 1:220000 topographic map. UK Antarctic Place-names Committee, 2009
- Antarctic Digital Database (ADD). Scale 1:250000 topographic map of Antarctica. Scientific Committee on Antarctic Research (SCAR). Since 1993, regularly upgraded and updated
