= Orléans Strait =

Strait separating Trinity Island and Tower Island from Davis Coast

Coordinates: 63°50′S 60°20′W

Orléans Strait is a strait running NE-SW and separating Trinity Island and Tower Island from Davis Coast, Antarctic Peninsula. Possibly first seen by Nathaniel B. Palmer, captain of the Hero, on November 18, 1820. Named and outlined in part by the French Antarctic Expedition, 1837–40, under Captain Jules Dumont d'Urville. Charted in greater detail by the Swedish Antarctic Expedition, 1901–04, under Otto Nordenskiöld. According to USGS records, it was presumably named for the royal house of Orléans; Louis Philippe (formerly Duc d'Orléans) was King of France at the time of d'Urville's voyage.
