= Ocean Fisheries - Burgas =

Bulgarian company

Ocean Fisheries – Burgas Co was a Bulgarian company founded in 1964 and based in the Black Sea port city of Burgas, whose ocean trawlers and freezer vessels undertook fishing voyages in the Atlantic, Indian and Pacific Oceans, including their southern portions now known as Antarctic Ocean. The fish was either sold in foreign fishing ports or shipped to Burgas and processed by the fish canning plant of Slavyanka Co.

In particular, ships of the company operated in the waters of South Georgia, Kerguelen, the South Orkney Islands, South Shetland Islands and Antarctic Peninsula from 1970 to the early 1990s. Designated onboard teams of marine biologists undertook fisheries research off South Georgia and the South Orkney Islands. Those Bulgarian fishermen, along with those of the Soviet Union, Poland, and East Germany, were the pioneers of modern Antarctic fishing industry. Several dozen geographical features in Antarctica are named in association with the company.
