= Trinity Island =

Island of Antarctica

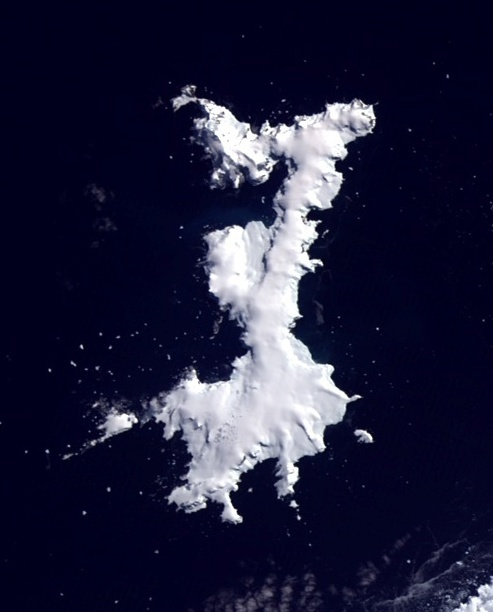
- Satellite image of Trinity Island

- Location of Trinity Island

- Location in Antarctica Trinity Island (Antarctica)

Geography
- Location: Antarctica
- Coordinates: 63°47′S 60°44′W
- Archipelago: Palmer Archipelago
- Length: 24 km (14.9 mi)
- Width: 10 km (6 mi)

Administration
- Administered under the Antarctic Treaty System

Demographics
- Population: Uninhabited

Trinity Island or Île de la Trinité or Isla Trinidad is an island 24 km (15 mi) long and 10 km (6 mi) wide in the northern part of the Palmer Archipelago, Antarctica. It lies 37 km (23 mi) east of Hoseason Island, 72.6 km (45 mi) south of Deception Island in the South Shetland Islands, and 10.3 km (6 mi) north-northwest of Cape Andreas on the Antarctic Peninsula. The island was named by Otto Nordenskiöld, leader of the 1901-1904 Swedish Antarctic Expedition (SAE) in commemoration of Edward Bransfield's "Trinity Land" of 1820.

== History ==
Trinity Island, or the adjoining Davis Coast stretch of the Antarctic Peninsula, may have been the first part of Antarctica spotted by Nathaniel Palmer, on 16 November 1820. He was an American sealer, exploring southwards from Cape Horn in his little sloop searching for seal rookeries. The whole archipelago was named in his honour in 1897 by Adrien de Gerlache, leader of the Belgian Antarctic Expedition.

== Geography ==
Trinity Island is one of the most northerly of the islands of the Palmer Archipelago, a chain of more than fifty islands running parallel with the coast of the Antarctic Peninsula. It is about 24 km (15 mi) long and 10 km (6 mi) wide, with an irregular shape and coastline that encompasses many points, capes, bays, coves, and other subordinate features. Many of these geographic features have been charted and named by various Antarctic expeditions, as well as the nations of Argentina and Bulgaria.

Trinity Island is separated from Tower Island to the east by Gilbert Strait. Both islands are separated from the Davis Coast to the south by Orléans Strait, running northeast–southwest. To the southwest, Chayka Passage separates Trinity Island from Spert Island by just 110 m (360 ft).

=== Northern portion ===
Cape Wollaston marks the island's northwest extremity. The name was originally applied by the 1828-1831 British Chanticleer expedition for William H. Wollaston, commissioner of the Royal Society from 1818–28. To the east along the north coast is Lorna Cove, 1.1 km (0.68 mi) wide, with ice-covered Albatros Point marking its eastern shore. Both features were named for Bulgarian fishing trawlers from the Ocean Fisheries company. Continuing east, Cape Neumayer forms the northeast end of Trinity Island. It was charted by the SAE and named after German geophysicist Georg B. von Neumayer.

On the west coast, Preker Point sits 2.1 km (1.3 mi) to the southwest of Cape Wollaston. It is named for a mountain in the Balkan Mountains. It marks the northern point of Saldobisa Cove, which is 2.3 km (1.4 mi) wide, and was named for an ancient Thracian settlement in northern Bulgaria. Burya Point, formed by an offshoot of Ketripor Hill, divides Saldobisa from Olusha Cove to the south. It was named for Burya, a village in Bulgaria. Olusha Cove, named for a Bulgarian fishing trawler, is 2.7 km (1.7 mi) wide and marked to the south by Consecuencia Point.

Continuing south down the west coast, just north of Lyon Peak, sits Milburn Bay, fed by Pastra Glacier. The bay was shown on an Argentine government chart of 1952 and named by the UK Antarctic Place-Names Committee (UKAPC) in 1960 for M. R. Milburn, an air traffic control officer of the Falkland Islands and Dependencies Aerial Survey Expedition (FIDASE), which photographed this area in the period 1955–57.

=== Southern portion ===
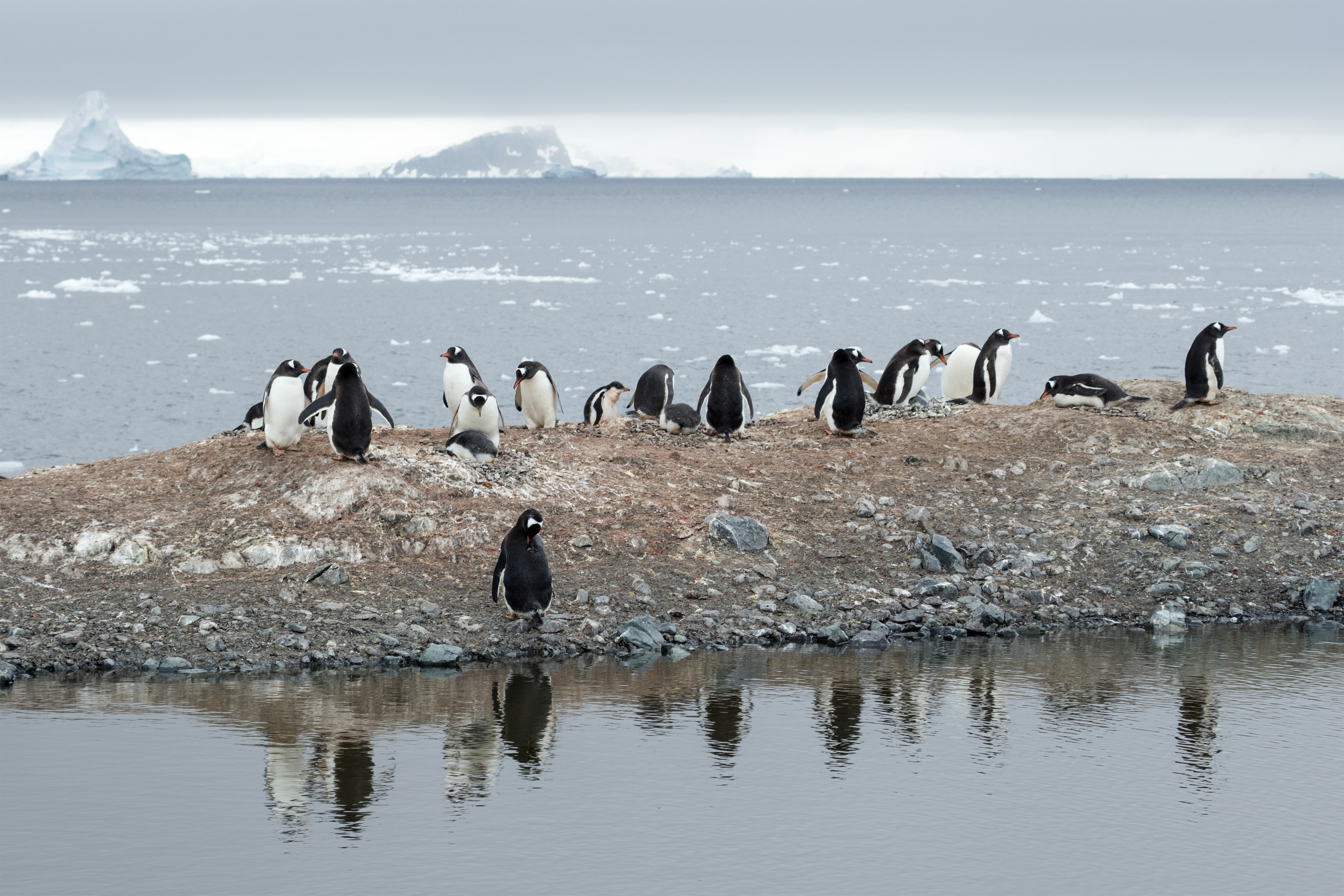
Gentoo penguins at Mikkelsen Harbor, Trinity Island

Towards the southern end of the west coast is Krivina Bay, a 5 km (3.1 mi)-wide bay that indents the coast to a depth of 3 km (1.9 mi). Three small, rocky islands lie in the northern part of the bay. Northernmost is Imelin Island, 600 m (2,000 ft) long by 380 m (1,250 ft) wide. Dink Island lies 120 m (390 ft) to the south. It is 610 m (2,000 ft) long by 320 m (1,050 ft) wide, and lies 180 m (590 ft) north of Rogulyat Island, which is the southernmost of the three. Rogulyat Island is 350 m (1,150 ft) long by 160 m (520 ft) wide. The bay and its islands are named for locations in Bulgaria: the villages of Dink, Krivina, and Rogulyat, and Imelin Cave.

On the southwest side of the island is Belimel Bay, a 5.9 km (3.7 mi)-wide bay that indents the coast to a depth of 3.9 km (2.4 mi). It is named for Belimel in northwestern Bulgaria. The bay is defined on the north by Spert Island and to the south by Asencio Point. The point is named for Alferez de Navío Salvador Asencio of the Uruguay. Tizoin Point, named for a cave in Bulgaria, projects southwards into the middle of the bay.

On the east side of the southern portion of the island, 6 kilometres (4 mi) northeast of Borge Point, Awl Point projects a short distance from the shore. Awl Point was shown on an Argentine government chart of 1952, and named by the UKAPC in 1960 because the point is low in elevation but very sharply pointed in plan, suggesting an awl.

The southernmost point of the island is called Skottsberg Point, which marks the west side of Mikkelsen Harbor, the most prominent feature on the southern half of the island.

=== Offshore features ===
The Hydrodist Rocks lie 4 nautical miles (7 km) off the west coast of Trinity Island. They were first fixed in January 1964 by HMS Protector (A146) by means of a helicopter-borne hydrodist.

Judas Rock lies 5 nautical miles (9 km) west of the southwest end of the island. First shown on an Argentine government chart of 1950, UKAPC named it in 1960 after Judas Iscariot because the rock marks the southern extremity of a hazardous shoal area which extends northward from it for 3 nautical miles (6 km) in an otherwise clear passage.

== Important Bird Areas ==
=== Cape Wollaston ===
Cape Wollaston, at the northwest extremity of the island, has been designated an Important Bird Area (IBA) by BirdLife International because it supports a large breeding colony of about 10,000 pairs of southern fulmars. The 116 ha (290 acres) site comprises the ice-free land of the cape. It has an elevation of about 250 m.

=== Trinity Island south-west ===
A 45-hectare (110-acre) site comprising a rocky headland rising to 250 metres (820 ft) above sea level, at the south-western extremity of the island, has also been designated an IBA because it supports a breeding colony of about 200 pairs of Antarctic shags. Chinstrap penguins also nest at the site.

== See also ==
- List of Antarctic and subantarctic islands
