= Davis Coast =

Antarctic coast of northern Antarctic peninsula

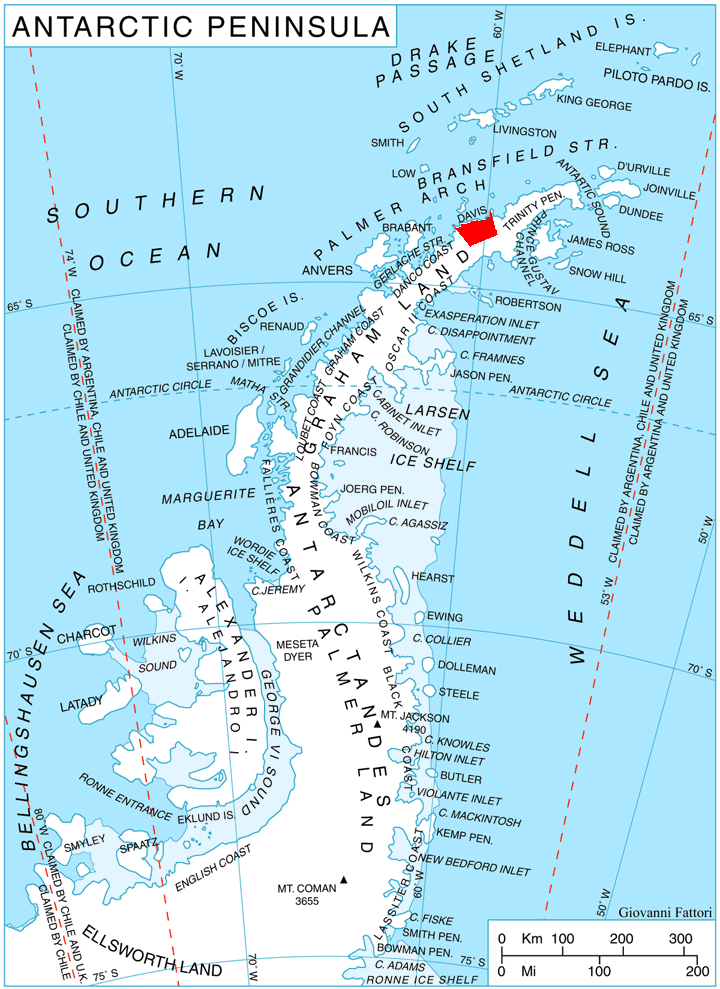
Location of Davis Coast.

Davis Coast (64°S 60°W) is that portion of the west coast of the Antarctic Peninsula between Cape Kjellman and Cape Sterneck. It was named by the Advisory Committee on Antarctic Names for Captain John Davis, the English-born American sealer who claimed to have made the first recorded landing on the continent of Antarctica at Hughes Bay on this coast in the Cecilia, February 7, 1821.
