= Biruni Island =

Antarctic island

- Location within South Shetland Islands Location within Antarctica

Geography
- Location: Antarctica
- Coordinates: 61°06′32.5″S 54°59′04″W
- Archipelago: South Shetland Islands
- Area: 3.59 ha (8.9 acres)
- Length: 450 m (1480 ft)
- Width: 150 m (490 ft)

Administration
- Administered under the Antarctic Treaty

Demographics
- Population: uninhabited

Map of Elephant Island

Biruni Island (Bulgarian: остров Бируни, romanized: ostrov Biruni, IPA: [ˈɔstrov biˈruni]) is the rocky island off the north coast of Elephant Island in the South Shetland Islands, Antarctica 450 m long in southwest–northeast direction and 150 m wide, with a surface area of 3.59 ha. It is separated from Elephant Island by a passage narrowing to 70 m at points. The island was formed as a result of the retreat of Elephant Island's ice cap at the turn of the 21st century.

The feature is named after Abu Rayhan Biruni (973–1048), an Iranian scholar who proposed the use of triangulation to measure distances and position places; in association with other names in the area deriving from the early development or use of geodetic instruments and methods.

== Location ==
Biruni Island is centred at 61°06′32.5″S 54°59′04″W, which is 21.3 km east-southeast of Cape Yelcho, 880 m southwest of Saffar Island, 6.56 km west-southwest of Point Wild and 820 m west-northwest of Ronalds Point. British mapping of the area in 1822,1972 and 2009.

== See also ==
- List of Antarctic and subantarctic islands

== Maps ==
- Chart of South Shetland including Coronation Island, &c. from the exploration of the sloop Dove in the years 1821 and 1822 by George Powell Commander of the same. Scale ca. 1:200000. London: Laurie, 1822.
- Elephant Island: From a survey by the Joint Services Expedition, December 1970. Scale 1:132000 topographic map. Royal Geographical Society (UK), 1972.
- British Antarctic Territory. Scale 1:200000 topographic map. DOS 610 Series, Sheet W 61 54. Directorate of Overseas Surveys, Tolworth, UK, 1972.
- South Shetland Islands: Elephant, Clarence and Gibbs Islands. Scale 1:220000 topographic map. UK Antarctic Place-names Committee, 2009.
- Antarctic Digital Database (ADD). Scale 1:250000 topographic map of Antarctica. Scientific Committee on Antarctic Research (SCAR). Since 1993, regularly upgraded and updated.
