= Trifonov Point =

Location of Elephant Island in the South Shetland Islands

Trifonov Point (Bulgarian: Трифонов нос, ‘Trifonov Nos’ \'tri-fo-nov 'nos\) is the rocky northeast entrance point of Zlatni Pyasatsi Cove on the southeast coast of Elephant Island, South Shetland Islands in Antarctica. The feature is “named after Captain Hristo Trifonov, commander of the Bulgarian ocean fishing trawlers Rotalia and Aktinia during their fishing trips to Antarctic waters off South Georgia from December 1983 to August 1984 and from December 1984 to July 1985 respectively. The Bulgarian fishermen, along with those of the Soviet Union, Poland and East Germany are the pioneers of modern Antarctic fishing industry.”

== Location ==
Trifonov Point is located at 61°14′57″S 55°10′20″W, which is 3.85 km northeast of Cape Lookout and 4.5 km southwest of Endurance Point. British mapping of the area in 1822,1972 and 2009.

== Maps ==
Map of Elephant Island

- Chart of South Shetland including Coronation Island, &c. from the exploration of the sloop Dove in the years 1821 and 1822 by George Powell Commander of the same. Scale ca. 1:200000. London: Laurie, 1822.
- British Antarctic Territory. Scale 1:200000 topographic map. DOS 610 Series, Sheet W 61 54. Directorate of Overseas Surveys, Tolworth, UK, 1972.
- South Shetland Islands: Elephant, Clarence and Gibbs Islands. Scale 1:220000 topographic map. UK Antarctic Place-names Committee, 2009.
- Antarctic Digital Database (ADD). Scale 1:250000 topographic map of Antarctica. Scientific Committee on Antarctic Research (SCAR). Since 1993, regularly upgraded and updated.
