= Digges Cove =

Antarctic cove

Location of Elephant Island in the South Shetland Islands

Map of Elephant Island

Digges Cove (Bulgarian: залив Дигс, romanized: zaliv Digges, IPA: ['zaliv 'digs]) is a 1.77 km wide cove indenting for 860 m on the north coast of Elephant Island in the South Shetland Islands, Antarctica southeast of Eratosthenes Point. It was formed as a result of the retreat of Snellius Glacier in the late 20th century. The area was visited by early 19th century sealers.

The feature is named after Leonard Digges (c. 1515–1559), a British mathematician and surveyor, inventor of the theodolite; in association with other names in the area deriving from the early development or use of geodetic instruments and methods.

== Location ==
Digges Cove is centred at 61°06′07″S 55°02′56″W, which is 18 km east-southeast of Cape Yelcho and 10.14 km west of Point Wild. British mapping of the area in 1822,1972 and 2009.

== Maps ==
- Chart of South Shetland including Coronation Island, &c. from the exploration of the sloop Dove in the years 1821 and 1822 by George Powell Commander of the same. Scale ca. 1:200000. London: Laurie, 1822
- Elephant Island: From a survey by the Joint Services Expedition, December 1970. Scale 1:132000 topographic map. Royal Geographical Society (UK), 1972
- British Antarctic Territory. Scale 1:200000 topographic map. DOS 610 Series, Sheet W 61 54. Directorate of Overseas Surveys, Tolworth, UK, 1972
- South Shetland Islands: Elephant, Clarence and Gibbs Islands. Scale 1:220000 topographic map. UK Antarctic Place-names Committee, 2009
- Antarctic Digital Database (ADD). Scale 1:250000 topographic map of Antarctica. Scientific Committee on Antarctic Research (SCAR). Since 1993, regularly upgraded and updated
