= Saffar Island =

Antarctic island

- Location within South Shetland Islands Location within Antarctica

Geography
- Location: Antarctica
- Coordinates: 61°06′23″S 54°57′45.5″W
- Archipelago: South Shetland Islands
- Area: 3.64 ha (9.0 acres)
- Length: 290 m (950 ft)
- Width: 230 m (750 ft)

Administration
- Administered under the Antarctic Treaty

Demographics
- Population: uninhabited

Map of Elephant Island

Saffar Island (Bulgarian: остров Сафар, romanized: ostrov Saffar, IPA: [ˈɔstrof sɐˈfar]) is the rocky island off the north coast of Elephant Island in the South Shetland Islands, Antarctica extending 290 m in west–east direction and 230 m in south–north direction, with a surface area of 3.64 ha. It is separated from Elephant Island by a passage narrowing to 325 m at points.

The feature is named after Abū al-Qāsim Ahmad ibn as-Saffār (d. 1035), an Andalusī astronomer and author of one of the Arabic treatises on the astrolabe that introduced the triangulation method to Europe; in association with other names in the area deriving from the early development or use of geodetic instruments and methods.

== Location ==
Saffar Island is centred at 61°06′23″S 54°57′45.5″W, which is 22.36 km east-southeast of Cape Yelcho, 5.4 km west-southwest of Point Wild, 360 m north-northeast of Ronalds Point and 880 m east-northeast of Biruni Island. British mapping of the area in 1822,1972 and 2009.

== See also ==
- List of Antarctic and subantarctic islands

== Maps ==
- Chart of South Shetland including Coronation Island, &c. from the exploration of the sloop Dove in the years 1821 and 1822 by George Powell Commander of the same. Scale ca. 1:200000. London: Laurie, 1822.
- Elephant Island: From a survey by the Joint Services Expedition, December 1970. Scale 1:132000 topographic map. Royal Geographical Society (UK), 1972.
- British Antarctic Territory. Scale 1:200000 topographic map. DOS 610 Series, Sheet W 61 54. Directorate of Overseas Surveys, Tolworth, UK, 1972.
- South Shetland Islands: Elephant, Clarence and Gibbs Islands. Scale 1:220000 topographic map. UK Antarctic Place-names Committee, 2009.
- Antarctic Digital Database (ADD). Scale 1:250000 topographic map of Antarctica. Scientific Committee on Antarctic Research (SCAR). Since 1993, regularly upgraded and updated.
