= Slavyanka Beach =

Beach in Antarctica

Location of Elephant Island in the South Shetland Islands

Slavyanka Beach (Bulgarian: бряг Славянка, romanized: bryag Slavyanka, IPA: [ˈbrʲak sɫɐˈvʲaŋkɐ]) is the mostly ice-free 2.2 km long beach forming the southwest coast of Gurkovska Cove in eastern Elephant Island, South Shetland Islands in Antarctica. It is bounded by Walker Point on the southeast and the terminus of Stadium Glacier on the northwest. The feature was formed as a result of glacier retreat in the first decade of 21st century.

The beach is “named after the fish canning plant Slavyanka in Burgas, Bulgaria that processed Antarctic fish supplied by fishing vessels of the company Ocean Fisheries – Burgas whose ships operated in the waters of South Georgia, Kerguelen, the South Orkney Islands, South Shetland Islands and Antarctic Peninsula from 1970 to the early 1990s. The Bulgarian fishermen, along with those of the Soviet Union, Poland and East Germany are the pioneers of modern Antarctic fishing industry.”

== Location ==
Slavyanka Beach is centred at 61°08′05″S 54°42′40″W. British mapping of the area in 1822,1972 and 2009.

== Maps ==
Map of Elephant Island

- Chart of South Shetland including Coronation Island, &c. from the exploration of the sloop Dove in the years 1821 and 1822 by George Powell Commander of the same. Scale ca. 1:200000. London: Laurie, 1822.
- British Antarctic Territory. Scale 1:200000 topographic map. DOS 610 Series, Sheet W 61 54. Directorate of Overseas Surveys, Tolworth, UK, 1972.
- South Shetland Islands: Elephant, Clarence and Gibbs Islands. Scale 1:220000 topographic map. UK Antarctic Place-names Committee, 2009.
- Antarctic Digital Database (ADD). Scale 1:250000 topographic map of Antarctica. Scientific Committee on Antarctic Research (SCAR). Since 1993, regularly upgraded and updated.
