= Krastanov Cove =

Location of Elephant Island in the South Shetland Islands

Krastanov Cove (Bulgarian: Кръстанов залив, ‘Krastanov Zaliv’ \kra-'sta-nov 'za-liv\) is the 1.6 km wide cove indenting for 1.2 km the southwest coast of Elephant Island, South Shetland Islands in Antarctica southeast of Piperkov Point. The feature is “named after Captain Ivan Krastanov (1946-2003), commander of the Bulgarian ocean fishing trawlers Sagita and Fizalia during their fishing trips to Antarctic waters off South Georgia from February to July 1978 and from December 1978 to May 1979 respectively. The Bulgarian fishermen, along with those of the Soviet Union, Poland and East Germany are the pioneers of modern Antarctic fishing industry.”

== Location ==
Krastanov Cove is centred at 61°14′10″S 55°20′15″W, which is 8.64 km northwest of Cape Lookout. Its southeast entrance point is situated 7.94 km northwest of Cape Lookout. British mapping of the area in 1822,1972 and 2009.

== Maps ==
Map of Elephant Island

- Chart of South Shetland including Coronation Island, &c. from the exploration of the sloop Dove in the years 1821 and 1822 by George Powell Commander of the same. Scale ca. 1:200000. London: Laurie, 1822.
- British Antarctic Territory. Scale 1:200000 topographic map. DOS 610 Series, Sheet W 61 54. Directorate of Overseas Surveys, Tolworth, UK, 1972.
- South Shetland Islands: Elephant, Clarence and Gibbs Islands. Scale 1:220000 topographic map. UK Antarctic Place-names Committee, 2009.
- Antarctic Digital Database (ADD). Scale 1:250000 topographic map of Antarctica. Scientific Committee on Antarctic Research (SCAR). Since 1993, regularly upgraded and updated.
