= Minstrel Point =

Coordinates: 61°4′S 55°25′W

Minstrel Point is a point about midway between Cape Lindsey and Cape Yelcho on the west coast of Elephant Island, in the South Shetland Islands off Antarctica. It was named by the UK Joint Services Expedition to Elephant Island of 1970–71, after the brig Minstrel (Captain MacGregor), a sealer from London, which anchored north of this feature in February 1821.
