= Piperkov Point =

Point on Elephant Island, Antarctica

Location of Elephant Island in the South Shetland Islands

Piperkov Point (Bulgarian: Пиперков нос, ‘Piperkov Nos’ \pi-'per-kov 'nos\) is the rocky northwest entrance point of Krastanov Cove on the southwest coast of Elephant Island, South Shetland Islands in Antarctica. The feature is “named after Captain Hristo Piperkov, Director (1988-1991) of the Bulgarian company Ocean Fisheries – Burgas whose ships operated in the waters of South Georgia, Kerguelen, the South Orkney Islands, South Shetland Islands and Antarctic Peninsula from 1970 to the early 1990s. The Bulgarian fishermen, along with those of the Soviet Union, Poland and East Germany are the pioneers of modern Antarctic fishing industry.”

== History ==
A nameless cove on the northwest side of the point hosts the wreckage of a sailing ship, possibly the Stonington, Connecticut sealer Charles Shearer under Captain William Appelman that was lost in the area in late 1877. That cove is designated as a Historic Site and Monument in Antarctica (HSM 74).

== Location ==
Piperkov Point is located at 61°14′12″S 55°21′20″W, which is 9.4 km northwest of Cape Lookout and 2.2 km southeast of Stinker Point. British mapping of the area in 1822,1972 and 2009.

== Maps ==
Map of Elephant Island

- Chart of South Shetland including Coronation Island, &c. from the exploration of the sloop Dove in the years 1821 and 1822 by George Powell Commander of the same. Scale ca. 1:200000. London: Laurie, 1822.
- British Antarctic Territory. Scale 1:200000 topographic map. DOS 610 Series, Sheet W 61 54. Directorate of Overseas Surveys, Tolworth, UK, 1972.
- South Shetland Islands: Elephant, Clarence and Gibbs Islands. Scale 1:220000 topographic map. UK Antarctic Place-names Committee, 2009.
- Antarctic Digital Database (ADD). Scale 1:250000 topographic map of Antarctica. Scientific Committee on Antarctic Research (SCAR). Since 1993, regularly upgraded and updated.
