= Borceguí Island =

Island in Antarctica

- Elephant Island

- Location within Antarctic Peninsula Location within Antarctica

Geography
- Location: Antarctica
- Coordinates: 61°3′S 55°9′W

Administration
- Administered under the Antarctic Treaty System

Demographics
- Population: Uninhabited

Borceguí Island (61°3′S 55°9′W) is an ice-free island in the South Shetland Islands, midway between Cape Yelcho and the Gibbous Rocks, 2 kilometres (1 nmi) off the north coast of Elephant Island. The name was applied by the command of the Argentine sea-going tug Chiriguano in the 1954–55 cruise; in Spanish "borceguí" means half-boot and describes the shape of the island.

== See also ==
- List of antarctic and sub-antarctic islands
