= Sintika Cove =

Cove on Elephant Island, Antarctica

Location of Elephant Island in the South Shetland Islands

Sintika Cove (Bulgarian: залив Синтика, ‘Zaliv Sintika’ \'za-liv 'sin-ti-ka\) is the 4 km wide cove indenting for 2.35 km the southeast coast of Elephant Island in the South Shetland Islands, Antarctica. It is entered north of Endurance Point and south of the end of Endurance Glacier, and surmounted by Mount Elder on the southwest. The feature was formed as a result of the retreat of Endurance Glacier in the first decade of 21st century.

The cove is named after the ancient Thracian region of Sintika in Southwestern Bulgaria.

== Location ==
Sintika Cove is centred at 61°12′05″S 55°08′25″W. British mapping of the area in 1822,1972 and 2009.

== Maps ==
Map of Elephant Island

- Chart of South Shetland including Coronation Island, &c. from the exploration of the sloop Dove in the years 1821 and 1822 by George Powell Commander of the same. Scale ca. 1:200000. London: Laurie, 1822.
- British Antarctic Territory. Scale 1:200000 topographic map. DOS 610 Series, Sheet W 61 54. Directorate of Overseas Surveys, Tolworth, UK, 1972.
- South Shetland Islands: Elephant, Clarence and Gibbs Islands. Scale 1:220000 topographic map. UK Antarctic Place-names Committee, 2009.
- Antarctic Digital Database (ADD). Scale 1:250000 topographic map of Antarctica. Scientific Committee on Antarctic Research (SCAR). Since 1993, regularly upgraded and updated.
