= Zlatni Pyasatsi Cove =

Location of Elephant Island in the South Shetland Islands

Zlatni Pyasatsi Cove (Bulgarian: залив Златни пясъци, ‘Zaliv Zlatni Pyasatsi’ \'za-liv 'zla-tni 'pya-sa-tsi\) is the 1.4 km wide cove indenting for 1.1 km the southeast coast of Elephant Island, South Shetland Islands in Antarctica southwest of Trifonov Point. The feature is “named after the freezer vessel Zlatni Pyasatsi of the Bulgarian company Ocean Fisheries – Burgas whose ships operated in the waters of South Georgia, Kerguelen, the South Orkney Islands, South Shetland Islands and Antarctic Peninsula from 1970 to the early 1990s. The Bulgarian fishermen, along with those of the Soviet Union, Poland and East Germany are the pioneers of modern Antarctic fishing industry.”

== Location ==
Zlatni Pyasatsi Cove is centred at 61°15′00″S 55°11′00″W, which is 3.5 km north-northwest of Cape Lookout. British mapping of the area in 1822,1972 and 2009.

== Maps ==
Map of Elephant Island

- Chart of South Shetland including Coronation Island, &c. from the exploration of the sloop Dove in the years 1821 and 1822 by George Powell Commander of the same. Scale ca. 1:200000. London: Laurie, 1822.
- British Antarctic Territory. Scale 1:200000 topographic map. DOS 610 Series, Sheet W 61 54. Directorate of Overseas Surveys, Tolworth, UK, 1972.
- South Shetland Islands: Elephant, Clarence and Gibbs Islands. Scale 1:220000 topographic map. UK Antarctic Place-names Committee, 2009.
- Antarctic Digital Database (ADD). Scale 1:250000 topographic map of Antarctica. Scientific Committee on Antarctic Research (SCAR). Since 1993, regularly upgraded and updated.
