= Boyadzhiev Point =

Antarctic headland

Location of Elephant Island in the South Shetland Islands

Map of Elephant Island

Boyadzhiev Point (Bulgarian: Бояджиев нос, romanized: Boyadzhiev nos, IPA: [bojɐ'dʒiɛf 'nɔs]) is the rocky northeast entrance point to Gurkovska Cove on the east coast of Elephant Island in the South Shetland Islands, Antarctica. The area was visited by early 19th century sealers.

The feature is named after Lieut. Gen. Kliment Boyadzhiev (1861-1933), an accomplished military commander and one of the founders of Bulgarian topography, author of an early relief map of Bulgaria.

== Location ==
Boyadzhiev Point is located at 61°07′14″S 54°39′16″W, which is 1.86 km south of Cape Valentine and 3.9 km northeast of Walker Point. British mapping of the area in 1822,1972 and 2009.

== Maps ==
- Chart of South Shetland including Coronation Island, &c. from the exploration of the sloop Dove in the years 1821 and 1822 by George Powell Commander of the same. Scale ca. 1:200000. London: Laurie, 1822.
- Elephant Island: From a survey by the Joint Services Expedition, December 1970. Scale 1:132000 topographic map. Royal Geographical Society (UK), 1972.
- British Antarctic Territory. Scale 1:200000 topographic map. DOS 610 Series, Sheet W 61 54. Directorate of Overseas Surveys, Tolworth, UK, 1972.
- South Shetland Islands: Elephant, Clarence and Gibbs Islands. Scale 1:220000 topographic map. UK Antarctic Place-names Committee, 2009.
- Antarctic Digital Database (ADD). Scale 1:250000 topographic map of Antarctica. Scientific Committee on Antarctic Research (SCAR). Since 1993, regularly upgraded and updated.
