= Eratosthenes Point =

Antarctic headland

Location of Elephant Island in the South Shetland Islands

Map of Elephant Island

Eratosthenes Point (Bulgarian: нос Ератостен, romanized: nos Eratosthenes, IPA: ['nɔs ɛrɐto'stɛn]) is the ice-covered, rock-tipped northwest entrance point to Digges Cove on the north coast of Elephant Island in the South Shetland Islands, Antarctica situated just west of the terminus of Snellius Glacier. The area was visited by early 19th century sealers.

The feature is named after the Greek mathematician and geographer Eratosthenes (c. 276-194 BC) who was the first to calculate the circumference of the Earth; in association with other names in the area deriving from the early development or use of geodetic instruments and methods.

== Location ==
Eratosthenes Point is located at 61°05′39″S 55°03′24″W, which is 17.2 km east-southeast of Cape Yelcho and 10.57 km west of Point Wild. British mapping of the area in 1822,1972 and 2009.

== Maps ==
- Chart of South Shetland including Coronation Island, &c. from the exploration of the sloop Dove in the years 1821 and 1822 by George Powell Commander of the same. Scale ca. 1:200000. London: Laurie, 1822.
- Elephant Island: From a survey by the Joint Services Expedition, December 1970. Scale 1:132000 topographic map. Royal Geographical Society (UK), 1972.
- British Antarctic Territory. Scale 1:200000 topographic map. DOS 610 Series, Sheet W 61 54. Directorate of Overseas Surveys, Tolworth, UK, 1972.
- South Shetland Islands: Elephant, Clarence and Gibbs Islands. Scale 1:220000 topographic map. UK Antarctic Place-names Committee, 2009.
- Antarctic Digital Database (ADD). Scale 1:250000 topographic map of Antarctica. Scientific Committee on Antarctic Research (SCAR). Since 1993, regularly upgraded and updated.
