= The Cornet =

Peak on Elephant Island, Antarctica

Coordinates: 61°7′S 54°47′W

The Cornet is a peak on the south side of Pardo Ridge between Muckle Bluff and The Stadium. Located on Elephant Island in the South Shetland Islands of Antarctica, it was named descriptively for its conical shape by the UK Joint Services Expedition, 1970-71.
