= Muckle Bluff =

Coordinates: 61°9′S 54°52′W

Muckle Bluff is a bluff 9 km (5.6 mi) west of Walker Point on the south coast of Elephant Island in the South Shetland Islands of Antarctica. It was mapped by the UK Joint Services Expedition, 1970-71. The descriptive name for this prominent feature was applied by the United Kingdom Antarctic Place-Names Committee (UK-APC) in 1971; muckle being an old Scottish word meaning large.
