= Mount Elder =

Mountain of Antarctica

Coordinates: 61°13′S 55°12′W

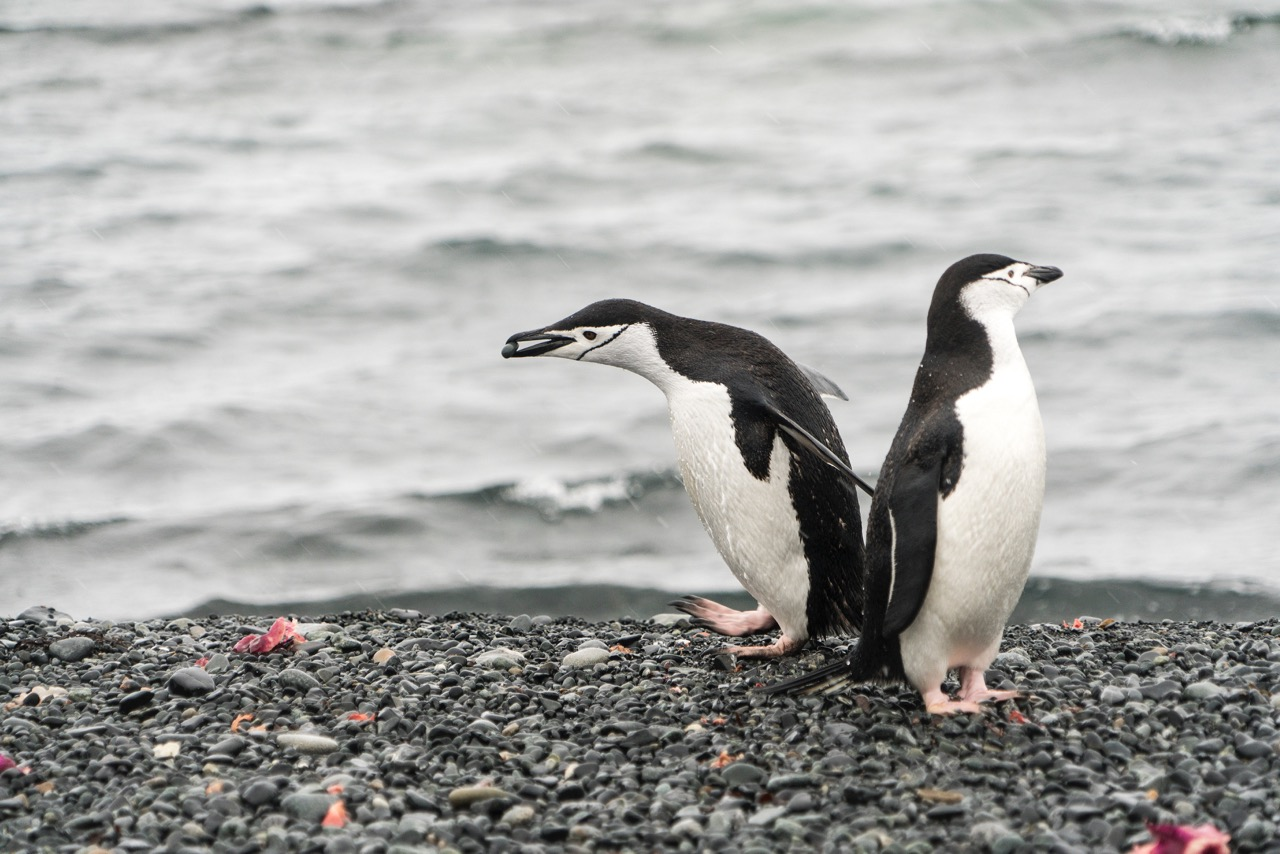
Chinstrap penguins breed in the IBA

Mount Elder is a 940-metre (3,080 ft) mountain lying between Endurance Glacier and Mount Pendragon on Elephant Island, in the South Shetland Islands of Antarctica. It was named by the UK Antarctic Place-Names Committee for Captain John P. Elder, Royal Engineers, surveyor of the U.K. Joint Services Expedition to Elephant Island in 1970–71.

== Important Bird Area ==
A 209-hectare (520-acre) tract of ice-free land 4 kilometres (2 nmi) east of the mountain, extending for 4 km along the shoreline, has been identified as an Important Bird Area (IBA) by BirdLife International because it supports a large breeding colony of about 14,000 pairs of chinstrap penguins.
