= Stinker Point =

Island of Antarctica

Coordinates: 61°13′S 55°23′W

Stinker Point is a headland 7 km (4.3 mi) south of Table Bay and 2.2 km (1.4 mi) northwest of Piperkov Point on the west coast of Elephant Island, in the South Shetland Islands of Antarctica. It was mapped by the UK Joint Services Expedition to Elephant Island, 1970–71, and named after the southern giant petrels which breed there, "stinker" being an old sailors' name for the bird.

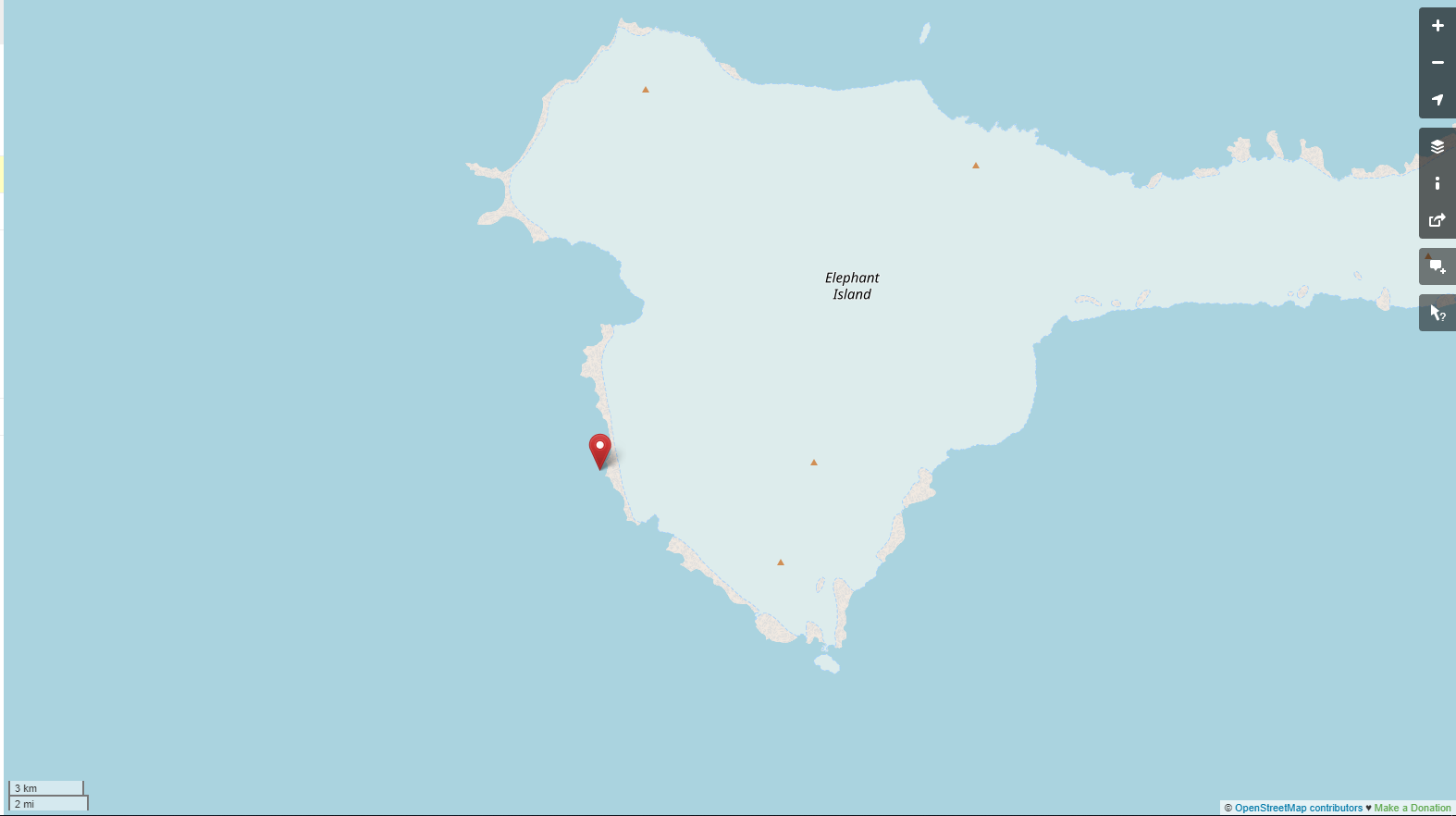
Location of Stinker Point on Elephant Island

== Important Bird Area ==
The point is part of the Point Wordie Important Bird Area, identified as such by BirdLife International because of its importance as a breeding site for seabirds, especially chinstrap penguins.
