= Gibbous Rocks =

Rock formation in the South Shetland Islands

- Location within Antarctica

Geography
- Location: Antarctica
- Coordinates: 61°3′S 54°59′W

Administration
- Administered under the Antarctic Treaty System

Demographics
- Population: Uninhabited

The Gibbous Rocks are a group of rocks located 7 km (4 nmi) northwest of Cape Belsham on Elephant Island in the South Shetland Islands of Antarctica. They were named by the UK Antarctic Place-Names Committee following their charting by the Joint Services Expedition, 1970–71. The name describes their humped or rounded shapes (gibbous meaning humped).
