= Furness Glacier =

Glacier in Antarctica

- Location of Elephant Island in the South Shetland Islands

- Location within South Shetland Islands Location within Antarctica
- Location: Elephant Island; South Shetland Islands
- Coordinates: 61°06′00″S 54°52′00″W
- Thickness: unknown
- Terminus: flowing between Cape Belsham and Point Wild
- Status: unknown

Furness Glacier (61°6′S 54°52′W) is a small glacier flowing between Cape Belsham and Point Wild to the north coast of Elephant Island, South Shetland Islands. It was charted and named by the Ernest Shackleton Endurance expedition 1914–16.

== See also ==
- List of glaciers in the Antarctic
- Glaciology
