= The Stadium (cirque) =

Cirque and glacier in the South Shetland Islands

Coordinates: 61°7′S 54°42′W

Location of Elephant Island in the South Shetland Islands

Map of Elephant Island

The Stadium is a cirque with mountains on three sides but open on the east, located 1 mi north of Walker Point on Elephant Island in the South Shetland Islands of Antarctica. The floor of this feature is occupied by a homonymous glacier feeding the head of Gurkovska Cove. Mapped by the U.K. Joint Services Expedition to Elephant Island, 1970–71. UK Antarctic Place-names Committee (UK-APC) applied the descriptive name for this bowl-shaped feature.
