= Mount Pendragon =

Mountain in Elephant Island, South Shetland Islands, Antarctica

Coordinates: 61°15′S 55°14′W

Mount Pendragon is a mountain (975 m high) 2.8 km (1.7 mi) north-west of Cape Lookout, on Elephant Island, in the South Shetland Islands of Antarctica. It was mapped by the UK Joint Services Expedition, 1970-71. The name was applied to this highest mountain on Elephant Island by the United Kingdom Antarctic Place-Names Committee (UK-APC) in 1971 and acknowledges Charles III, then Prince of Wales, as royal patron of the Joint Services Expedition. Pendragon is the ancient title for a Welsh Prince.

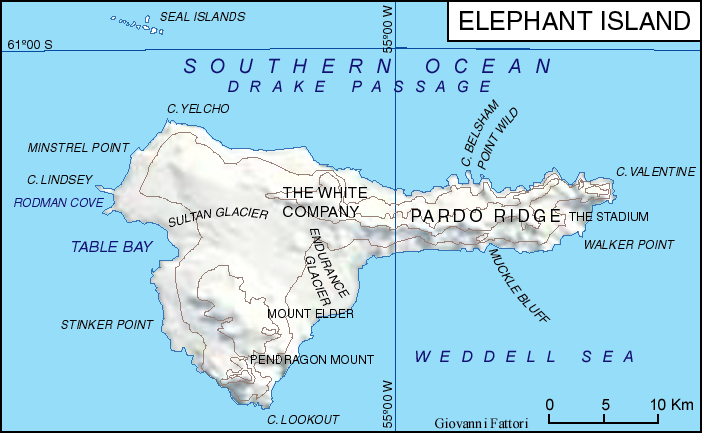
Map of Elephant Island with Mount Pendragon
