= Rodman Cove =

Body of water in Antarctica

Coordinates: 61°7′S 55°28′W

Rodman Cove is a cove south of Cape Lindsey on the west coast of Elephant Island, in the South Shetland Islands of Antarctica. It was named for Benjamin Rodman of New Bedford, Massachusetts, owner of whaling ships operating from that port in the 1820s and 1830s. The name was suggested by American geographer Lawrence Martin and has appeared in descriptions and charts of Elephant Island since about 1943.
