= Endurance Point =

Location of Elephant Island in the South Shetland Islands

Map of Elephant Island

Endurance Point is the rocky point on the south side of the entrance to Sintika Cove on the southeast coast of Elephant Island in the South Shetland Islands, Antarctica.

== Location ==
Endurance Point is located at 61°13′28.3″S 55°08′14″W, which is 7 km northeast of Cape Lookout. British mapping of the area in 1972 and 2009.

== Maps ==
- British Antarctic Territory. Scale 1:200000 topographic map. DOS 610 Series, Sheet W 61 54. Directorate of Overseas Surveys, Tolworth, UK, 1972.
- South Shetland Islands: Elephant, Clarence and Gibbs Islands. Scale 1:220000 topographic map. UK Antarctic Place-names Committee, 2009.
- Antarctic Digital Database (ADD). Scale 1:250000 topographic map of Antarctica. Scientific Committee on Antarctic Research (SCAR). Since 1993, regularly upgraded and updated.
