= Saddleback Point =

Headland of Antarctica

Coordinates: 61°06′S 54°54′W

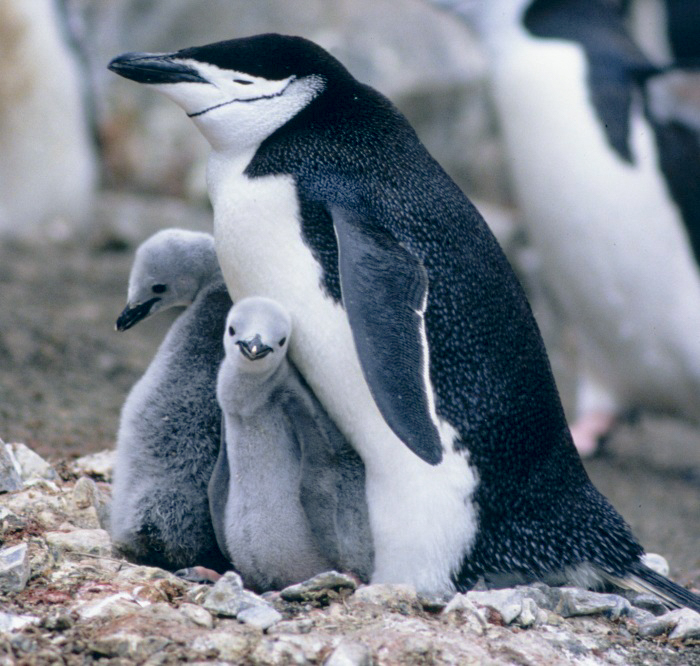
The IBA is an important breeding site for chinstrap penguins

Saddleback Point is a headland on the northern coast of Elephant Island, in the South Shetland Islands of Antarctica. The site lies 2 km (1.2 mi) to the west of Point Wild.

== Ecological significance ==
A 65 ha tract of ice-free land at the point has been identified as an Important Bird Area by BirdLife International because it supports a large breeding colony of about 10,000 pairs of chinstrap penguins.
