= Pardo Ridge =

Mountain ridge in Elephant Island, Antarctica

Coordinates: 61°07′30″S 54°53′00″W

Elephant Island map

Pardo Ridge is the second highest part of Elephant Island, South Shetland Islands, reaching an altitude of 853 meters. It extends from The White Company in the west to Cape Valentine in the east. It was mapped by the UK Joint Services Expedition, 1970-71, and named by the UK-APC after Captain Luis Pardo, commander of the Chilean tug Yelcho which rescued shipwrecked members of Shackleton's Endurance from Elephant Island's Wild Point in August 1916.

== See also ==
- The Cornet
