= Houlder Bluff =

Bluff on Elephant Island

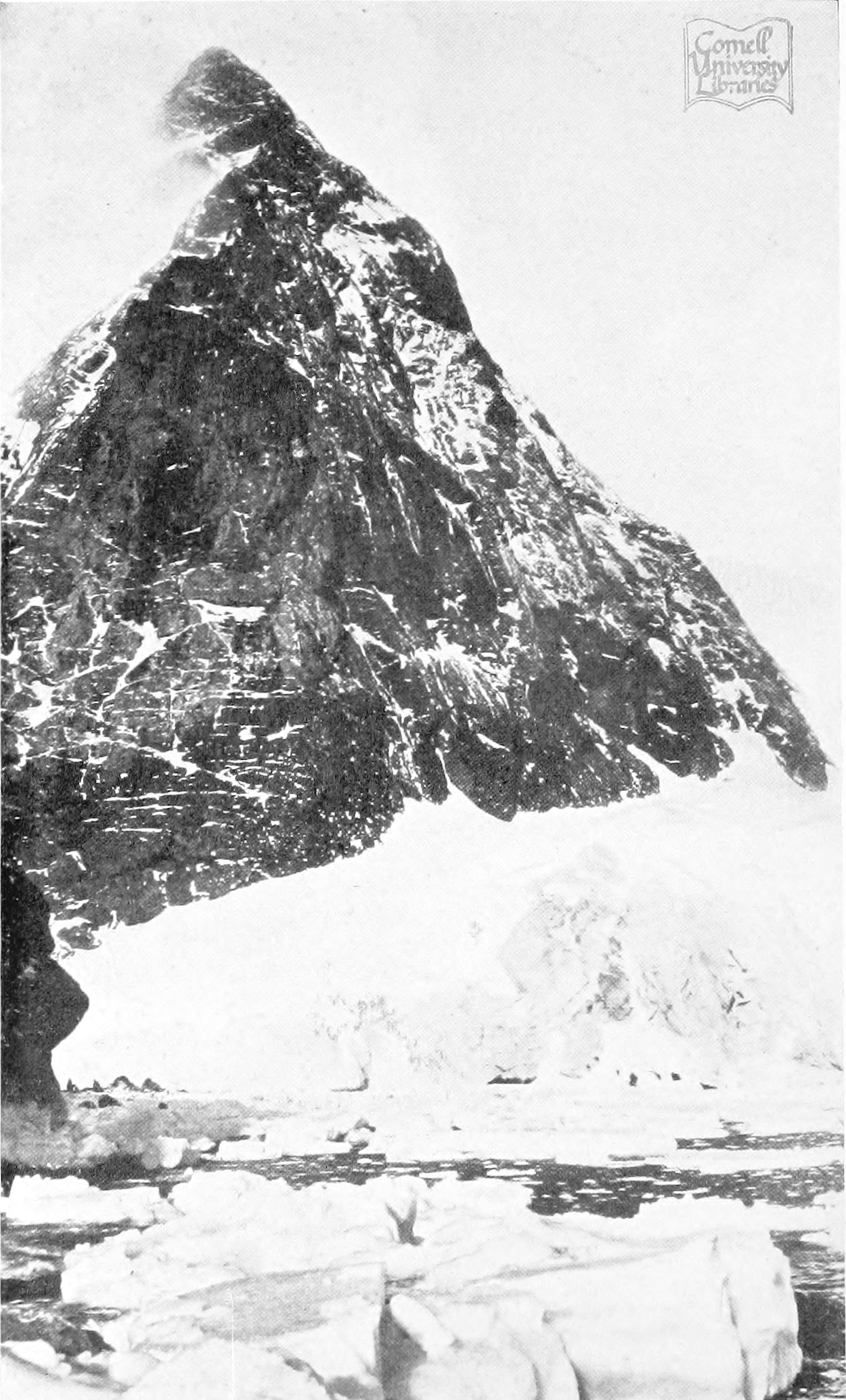
Mount Frank Houlder, Elephant Island

Houlder Bluff (61°6′S 54°51′W) is a bluff overlooking Point Wild on the north coast of Elephant Island, South Shetland Islands. This feature was named "Mount Frank Houlder" by Ernest Shackleton's Imperial Trans-Antarctic Expedition 1914–16, after Frank Houlder of the Houlder Steamship line, who assisted that expedition. Originally regarded as a distinct mountain from northward, it is now known to be backed inland by higher ground.
