= Mount Paget =

Highest point of South Georgia and the Sandwich Islands

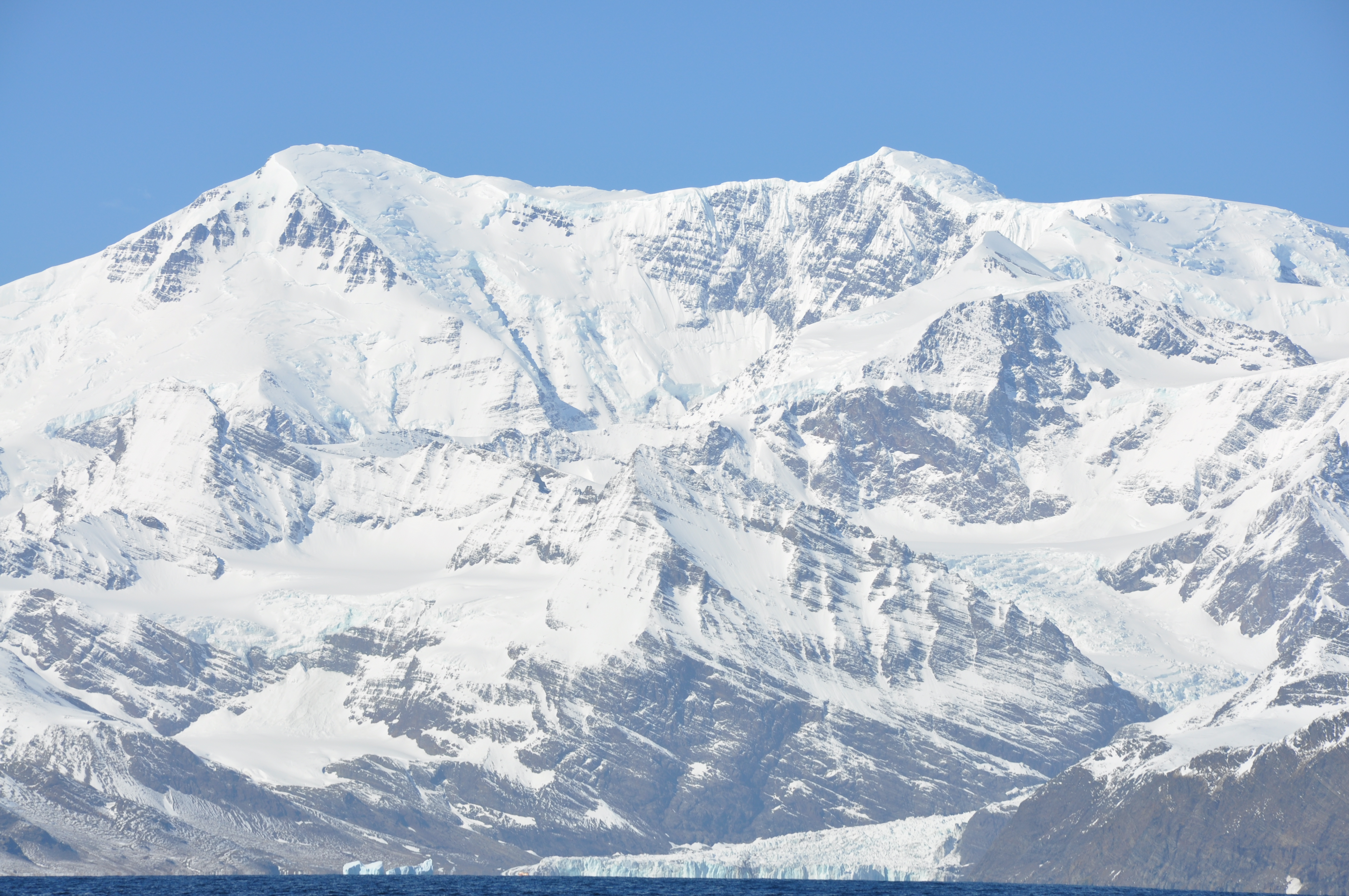
- Mount Paget

Highest point
- Elevation: 2,935 m (9,629 ft)
- Prominence: 2,935 m (9,629 ft); Ranked 102nd
- Isolation: 2,205.98 km (1,370.73 mi)
- Listing: Island high point Ultra
- Coordinates: 54°26′27″S 36°33′19″W

Geography
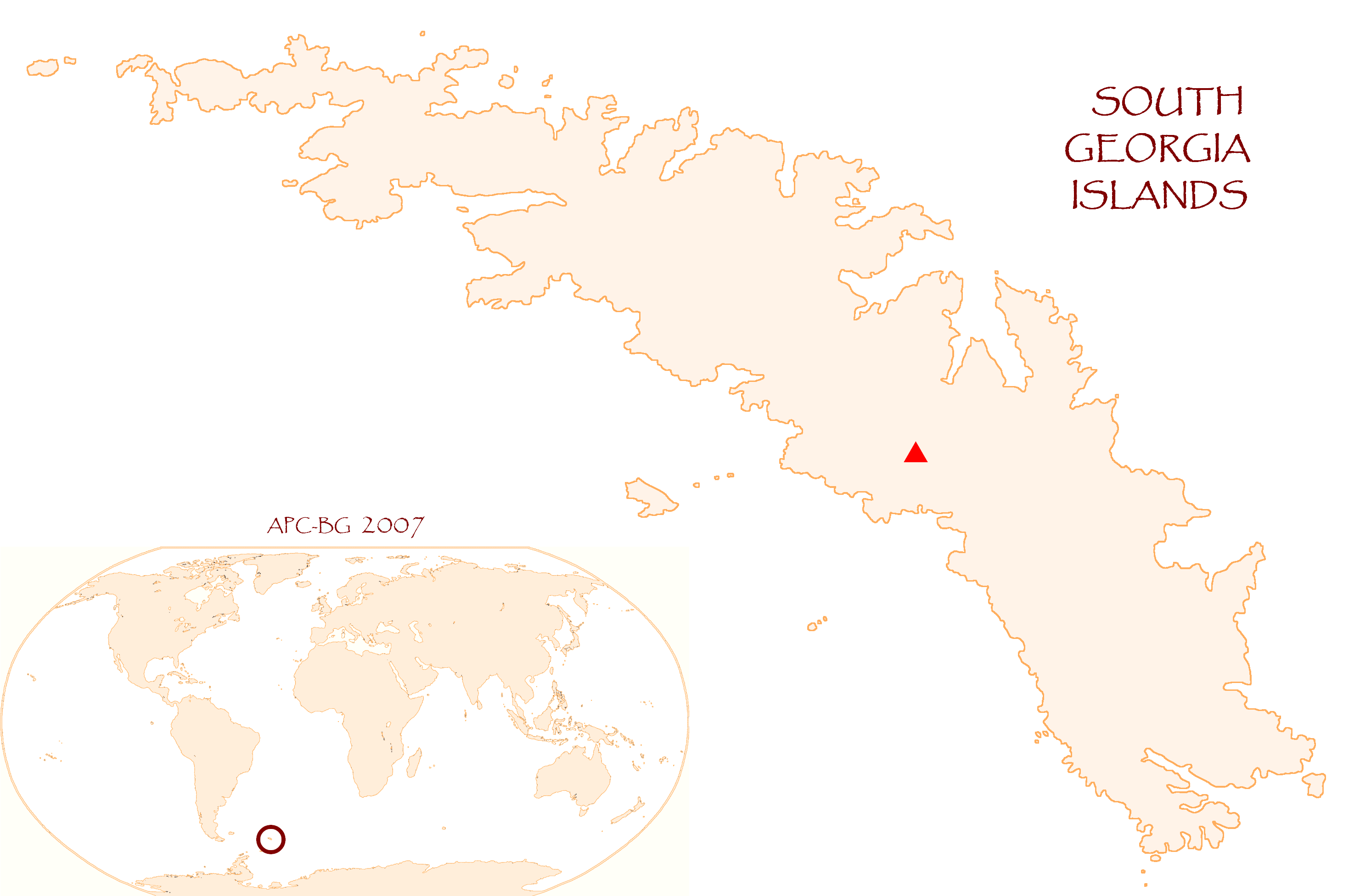
- Location of Mt. Paget
- Location: South Georgia
- Parent range: Allardyce Range

Climbing
- First ascent: Combined Services Expedition (British military) led by Commander Malcolm Burley, 30 December 1964
- Easiest route: snow/ice climb

Mount Paget is a summit of Allardyce Range on the South Atlantic/Antarctic island of South Georgia. At 9,629 feet (2,935 m) above the sea level, it is the highest peak on the island, and the highest peak in any territory under the sovereignty of the United Kingdom (excluding the British Antarctic Territory, where British sovereignty is unrecognised by most countries, where Mount Hope is the highest peak). Mount Paget is more than twice the height of Ben Nevis, the highest mountain on the island of Great Britain and is ranked 23rd by topographic isolation.

It is a saddle-shaped mountain, marking the highest point of the Allardyce Range in the central part of South Georgia. This feature was known to early sealers and whalers at South Georgia, and the name has long been established through general usage. It is clearly visible from Grytviken and King Edward Point.

The west peak of 9,565 feet (2,915 m) was climbed in December 1960 by Captain V. N. Stevenson, Lt. Cdr. M. K. Burly and Corporal B. Todd of the Royal Navy, landing at Cape Darnley by helicopter from HMS Protector. On 30 December 1964, the summit of 9,626 feet (2,934 m) was reached by Lieutenant S. H. Down, Sergeant T. J. Lynch and Senior Airman J. R. Chester of a British Combined Services expedition.

== See also ==
- Sutton Crag
- List of ultras of Antarctica
