= Ryan Reef =

Ryan Reef (54°26′S 36°7′W) is an isolated reef lying off the north coast of South Georgia, 0.5 nautical miles (0.9 km) north of the east entrance point of Doris Bay. The reef appears on a chart based upon surveys by DI personnel in the period 1925–31, but it may have been charted earlier. It was named by the United Kingdom Antarctic Place-Names Committee (UK-APC), following a survey by the SGS, 1951–52, for Alfredo R.L. Ryan, president of the Compania Argentina de Pesca, which operated the whaling station at Grytviken, South Georgia.
