= Cape Lindsey =

Geographical feature in Antarctica

Cape Lindsey is a cape which forms the western extremity of Elephant Island, north of Rodman Cove in the South Shetland Islands of Antarctica. The name appears on George Powell's map published by Richard Holmes Laurie in 1822.

3 nmi (5.6 km) northwest is West Reef, whose name is an old sealer name dating back to at least 1822, descriptive of its location relative to Elephant Island.

The Cruiser Rocks (61°13′S 55°28′W) are a group of rocks 7 nautical miles (13 km) south of Cape Lindsey. The rocks were known to sealers as early as 1822, and appeared on charts of that period by the name "Cruisers".
