= Fátima de Madrid =

Andalusian astronomer

- فاطمة المجريطية
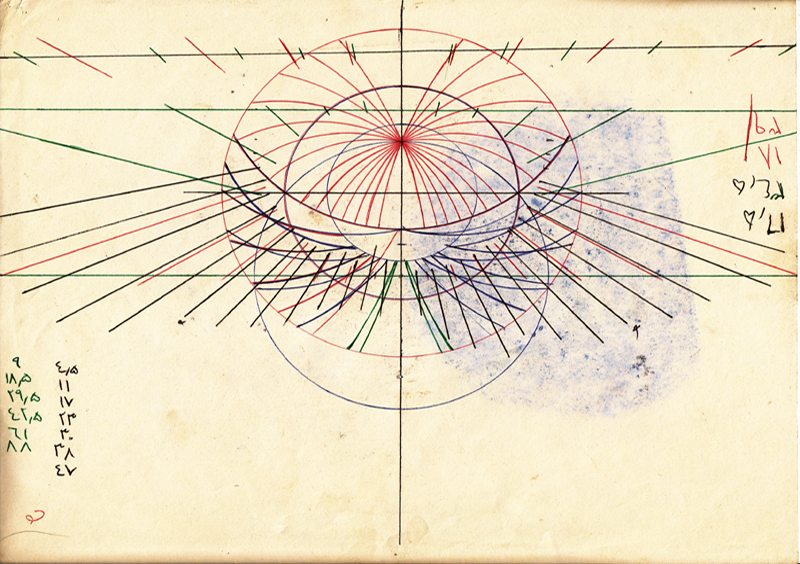
- Calculations with astrolabe one of the instruments related to Fátima de Madrid

Fátima de Madrid is the name given to an Arab Muslim astronomer and mathematician who supposedly lived during the late 10th and early 11th centuries in Islamic Spain. She was purportedly the daughter of the astronomer Maslama al-Majriti, with whom she is said to have worked on several astronomical and mathematical treatises, including the astronomical tables of Muhammad ibn Musa al-Khwarizmi. The earliest known account of her is the 1924 edition of the Enciclopedia Espasa-Calpe, and historians have cast doubt on whether she actually existed.

== Purported career ==
Fátima de Madrid is said to have lived in Córdoba, under the Caliphate of Córdoba, during the late 10th and early 11th centuries. She is said to have been the daughter of the famous Islamic astronomer and scientist Maslama al-Majriti.

Her most famous supposed work, known as the "Corrections from Fátima," are a series of astronomical and mathematical treatises, though no copy of it has ever been found. She also supposedly co-authored "A Treatise on the Astrolabe" with her father, which contains information about how to use astrolabes. Today, the manuscript is still allegedly preserved in the library of the monastery of El Escorial.

Fátima supposedly helped her father edit and adapt the astronomical tables of al-Khwarizmi, replacing the Persian solar calendar used in his models with the Islamic lunar calendar. They supposedly corrected the tables also to account for the geographical location of Córdoba, as well as for the meridian passing through it. With her father, she also supposedly translated the numeration of Persian to Arab years and determined the positions of the planets on the day of the Hijra. Fátima also supposedly helped her father correct Ptolemy's Almagest, which contained mistakes in the calculations of eclipses.

In addition, Fátima supposedly wrote several zījes, a type of Islamic astronomical treatise. These covered topics including calendars, ephemerides of the planets, the Sun, and the Moon, and solar and lunar eclipses.

Apart from her work on astronomy, Fátima was said to be able to speak, read, or write in Arabic, Spanish, Hebrew, Greek, and Latin.

== Historicity ==
Whether Fátima de Madrid actually existed is contested. The earliest known reference to her existence is the 1924 edition of the Enciclopedia Espasa-Calpe. As Ángel Requena Fraile, a historian of mathematics, explains:

In any project as ambitious as [the Enciclopedia Espasa-Calpe] there are errata, someone unscrupulous or some careless copyist. So a few myths are created, which are not documented, nor clothed by other sources, that refer to personages who should not be in the stories rather than myths. Francisco Vera, who is considered by many people as the father of the historiography of science in Spain, already warned when we he inquired about a geometer, Bishop of Calahorra in the Visigoth era, called Luciniano, that appears only in the Espasa and in no other sources. We have this situation with Fátima, the clever daughter of Maslama. We find something similar to what happens with Luciniano. There is no reference, no original or reliable source on which to stand.

Arabist, historian, and biographer of Al-Andalus Manuela Marín similarly holds that Fátima is a historical invention from the Espasa-Calpe. Marín attributes continued discussion about her, such as on the internet and with her inclusion in a 2009 calendar titled "Astronomers who made history", to uncritical repetition of the Espasa-Calpe's content.
