= Sutton Crag =

Mountain cliff in the United Kingdom

Coordinates: 54°23′S 36°29′W

Sutton Crag is a crag, 1,490 metres (4,890 ft), standing north of and connected by a long ridge to the west peak of Mount Paget in the Allardyce Range of South Georgia. Charted and unofficially named Sentinel or Sentinel Peak by the British South Georgia Expedition, 1954–55. To avoid duplication with other "sentinel" names, the United Kingdom Antarctic Place-Names Committee (UK-APC) in 1957 named this feature for George A. Sutton, leader of the expedition, who reached the summit in 1954.
