= Gurkovska Cove =

- (Bulgarian: залив Гурковска
- Location of Elephant Island in the South Shetland Islands

- Location in Antarctica
- Interactive map of Gurkovska Cove
- Location: Elephant Island, South Shetland Islands, Antarctica
- Group: South Shetland Islands
- Coordinates: 61°07′40″S 54°42′00″W
- Type: Cove
- Etymology: Named after Yuliya Gurkovska
- Part of: Southern Ocean
- Primary inflows: The Stadium Glacier
- Primary outflows: Southern Ocean
- Ocean/sea sources: Southern Ocean
- Basin countries: Antarctica
- Max. length: 2.5 km (8,200 ft)
- Max. width: 3 km (9,800 ft)
- Shore length^{1}: Slavyanka Beach (southwest side)
- Frozen: Seasonally ice-covered
- Settlements: None
- ^{1} Shore length is not a well-defined measure.

Gurkovska Cove (Bulgarian: залив Гурковска, ‘Zaliv Gurkovska’ \'za-liv 'gur-kov-ska\) is the 3 km wide cove indenting for 2.5 km the east extremity of Elephant Island in the South Shetland Islands, Antarctica. It is entered southwest of Boyadzhiev Point and northeast of Walker Point. Its southwest side is occupied by Slavyanka Beach. The feature was formed as a result of the retreat of The Stadium (a glacier feeding the cove's head) in the first decade of 21st century.

The cove is named after Yuliya Gurkovska (1945–2001), participant in the Second Bulgarian Antarctic Expedition 1993/94 (while serving as chief of staff of the Bulgarian President Zhelyu Zhelev at that time), for her support for the Bulgarian Antarctic programme. Gurkovska was an experienced explorer who sailed several times together with her husband Doncho Papazov in the course of a plankton research programme carried out onboard various lifeboats in the Black Sea, the Atlantic and the Pacific. Eventually, accompanied by their daughter Yana (then 6 years old), they circumnavigated the world in the yacht Tivia in 1979–1981.

== Location ==
Gurkovska Cove is centred at . British mapping of the area in 1822,1972 and 2009.

== Maps ==
Map of Elephant Island

- Chart of South Shetland including Coronation Island, &c. from the exploration of the sloop Dove in the years 1821 and 1822 by George Powell Commander of the same. Scale ca. 1:200000. London: Laurie, 1822.
- British Antarctic Territory. Scale 1:200000 topographic map. DOS 610 Series, Sheet W 61 54. Directorate of Overseas Surveys, Tolworth, UK, 1972.
- South Shetland Islands: Elephant, Clarence and Gibbs Islands. Scale 1:220000 topographic map. UK Antarctic Place-names Committee, 2009.
- Antarctic Digital Database (ADD). Scale 1:250000 topographic map of Antarctica. Scientific Committee on Antarctic Research (SCAR). Since 1993, regularly upgraded and updated.
