= Maslama al-Majriti =

10th-century Muslim mathematician and scholar

- Born: 950; Madrid, Al-Andalus (now Spain)
- Died: 1007 (aged 56–57); Córdoba, Caliphate of Córdoba (now Córdoba, Andalusia, Spain)
- Other names: Methilem
- Occupations: Muslim astronomer, alchemist, mathematician, scholar, economist

Abu al-Qasim Maslama ibn Ahmad al-Majriti (Arabic: أبو القاسم مسلمة بن أحمد المجريطي: c. 950–1007), known in European Latin-language sources as Methilem, was a Muslim Arab astronomer, alchemist, mathematician, economist and scholar in al-Andalus, active during the reign of Al-Hakam II. His full name is Abu 'l-Qāsim Maslama ibn Aḥmad al-Faraḍī al-Ḥāsib al-Maj̲rīṭī al-Qurṭubī al-Andalusī.

== Achievements ==
Al-Majrīṭī took part in the translation of Ptolemy's Planisphaerium, improved existing translations of the Almagest, introduced and improved the astronomical tables of Muhammad ibn Musa al-Khwarizmi, aided historians by working out tables to convert Persian dates to Hijri years, and introduced the techniques of surveying and triangulation.

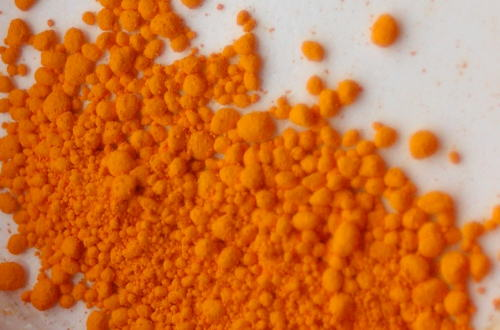
Al-Majrīṭī was one of the earliest alchemists to record the usage and experimentation of mercury(II) oxide.

According to Said al-Andalusi, he was the best mathematician and astronomer of his time in al-Andalus. He also introduced new surveying methods by working closely with his colleague ibn al-Saffar. He also wrote a book on taxation and the economy of al-Andalus.

He edited and made changes to parts of the Encyclopedia of the Brethren of Purity when it arrived in al-Andalus.

Al-Majrīṭī also predicted a futuristic process of scientific interchange and the advent of networks for scientific communication. He built a school of Astronomy and Mathematics and marked the beginning of organized scientific research in al-Andalus. Among his students were Ibn al-Saffar, Abu al-Salt, and at-Turtushi.

== Pseudo-Majrīṭī ==
From his date of death, inconsistencies result in the dating of two influential works in alchemy attributed to him, as either they were published long after his death, or they were the work of someone else claiming some of his glory: the latter is the current general belief.

The two works are the "Sage's Step/The Rank of the Wise" (Rutbat al-hakim, ?1009) and the Picatrix. Both were translated into Latin, in a version somewhat bowdlerised by Christian dogma, in 1252 on the orders of King Alfonso X of Castile; the original Arabic text dates probably from the middle of the eleventh century.

The Rutbat includes alchemical formulae and instructions for purification of precious metals, and was also the first to note the principle of conservation of mass, which he did in the course of his pathbreaking experiment on mercury(II) oxide:

I took natural quivering mercury, free from impurity, and placed it in a glass vessel shaped like an egg. This I put inside another vessel like a cooking pot, and set the whole apparatus over an extremely gentle fire. The outer pot was then in such a degree of heat that I could bear my hand upon it. I heated the apparatus day and night for forty days, after which I opened it. I found that the mercury (the original weight of which was a quarter of a pound) had been completely converted into red powder, soft to touch, the weight remaining as it was originally.

The Picatrix is more concerned with advanced esotericism, principally astrology and talismanic magic, although he also goes into prophecy. The author considers this the advanced level of work, occasionally referring to the Rutbat as the foundation text.

== Supposed daughter ==
Several modern sources state that al-Majriti had a daughter, Fátima de Madrid, who was also an astronomer. However, the earliest known mention of her is a short biographical article on her in the Enciclopedia universal ilustrada europeo-americana, published in the 1920s.
