= Cape Belsham =

Cape in the South Shetland Islands, Antarctica

Coordinates: 61°5′S 54°53′W

Cape Belsham is a prominent cape 0.9 km (0.56 mi) west of Point Wild on the north coast of Elephant Island, in the South Shetland Islands of Antarctica. The name dates back to about 1822 and is well established in international usage.
