= Ibn as-Saffar =

Spanish-Arab astronomer in Al-Andalus

An astrolabe by Ibn as-Saffar, 1020 AD, Cordoba, now a collection of Islamic Arts Museum Malaysia in Kuala Lumpur, Malaysia

Abu al‐Qasim Ahmad ibn Abd Allah ibn Umar al‐Ghafiqī ibn as-Saffar al‐Andalusi (born in Cordoba, died in the year 1035 at Denia), also known as Ibn as-Saffar (Arabic: ابن الصَّفَّار, literally: son of the brass worker), was a Spanish-Arab astronomer in Al-Andalus. He worked at the school founded by his colleague Al-Majriti in Córdoba. His best-known work was a treatise on the astrolabe, a text that was in active use until the 15th century and influenced the work of Kepler. He also wrote a commentary on the Zij as-Sindhind, and measured the coordinates of Mecca.

Ibn as-Saffar later influenced the works of Abu as-Salt.

Paul Kunitzsch argued that a Latin treatise on the astrolabe long attributed to Mashallah, and used by Chaucer to write A Treatise on the Astrolabe, is in fact written by Ibn as-Saffar.

The exoplanet Saffar, also known as Upsilon Andromedae b, is named in his honor.

Saffar Island in Antarctica is named after Ibn as-Saffar.
