= Endurance Glacier =

Flowing body of ice on Elephant Island near Antarctica

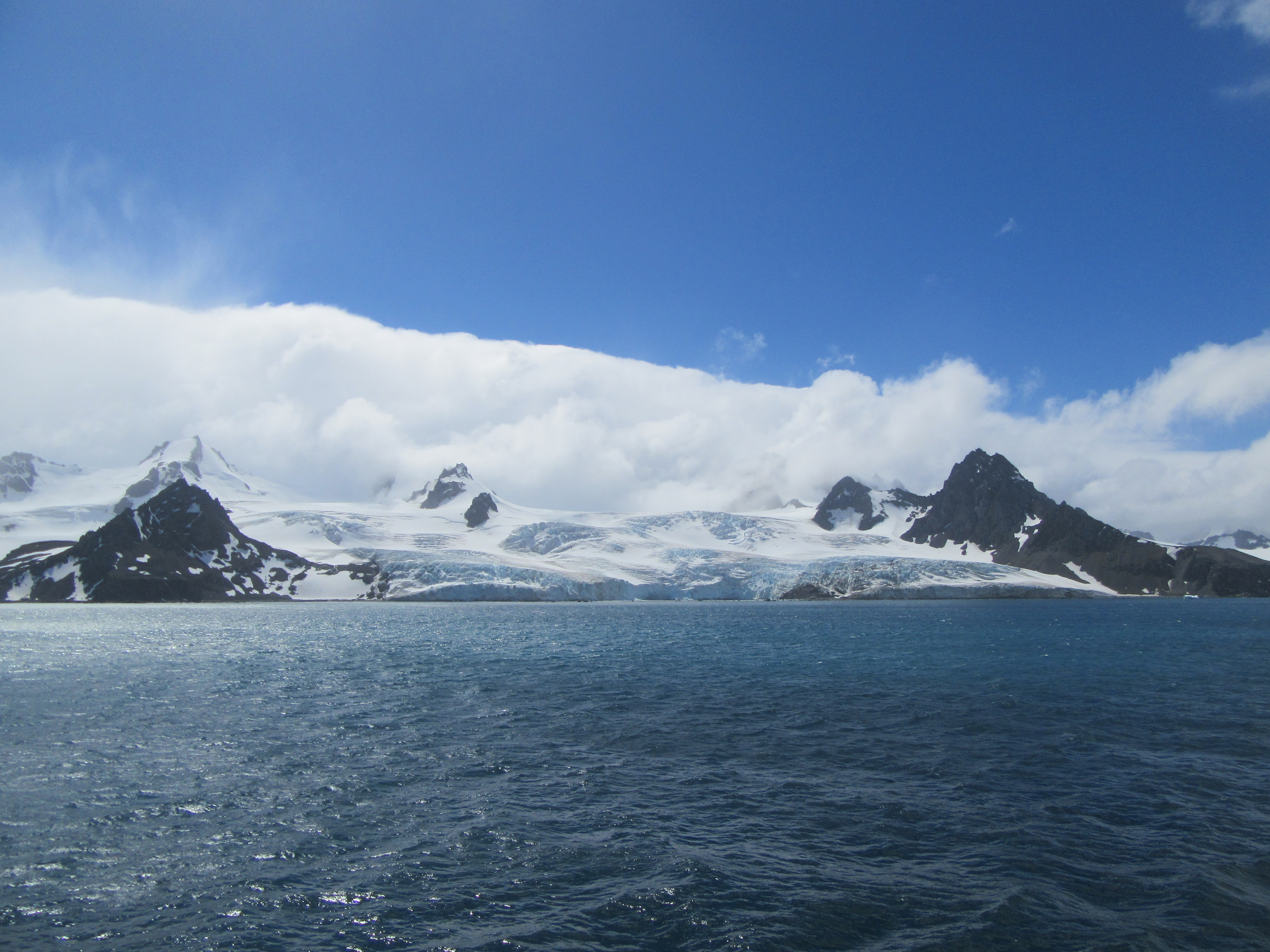
- Wide view of the Endurance Glacier

- Location within South Shetland Islands Location within Antarctica
- Location: Elephant Island; South Shetland Islands
- Coordinates: 61°10′S 55°8′W
- Thickness: unknown
- Terminus: south coast of Elephant Island
- Status: unknown

Endurance Glacier is a broad glacier north of Mount Elder, draining south-east to the south coast of Elephant Island in the South Shetland Islands of Antarctica, and is the main discharge glacier on the island. It was named by the UK Antarctic Place-Names Committee after HMS Endurance (Captain P.W. Buchanan, Royal Navy), which anchored off the glacier on several occasions in support of the Joint Services Expedition to Elephant Island, 1970–71.

== See also ==
- List of glaciers in the Antarctic
- Glaciology
