= Malcolm Burley =

British Antarctic explorer, mountaineer, naval officer and public school bursar

Commander Malcolm Keith Burley, (1927–2010) MBE was a British Antarctic explorer, mountaineer and Royal Navy officer. He received the Cuthbert Prize from the Royal Geographical Society.

Burley's first visit to the Antarctic was in 1960 as an officer on HMS Protector when he climbed Mt Liotard (2225 m), the second-highest peak on the remote Adelaide Island.

In 1964 he led a Combined Services Expedition to South Georgia which crossed the island following Sir Ernest Shackleton's route after his epic journey from Elephant Island to seek rescue for his men of the Imperial Trans-Antarctic Expedition. On the 1964 expedition Burley made the first ascent of Mount Paget, Mount Sugartop and Mount Burley named after him by the UK Antarctic Place-Names Committee.

In 1970/71 Burley led a Joint Services Expedition which was dropped off on Elephant Island by HMS Endurance. The party then spent six months carrying out a survey of the island and other scientific research for the British Antarctic Survey and climbing some of the peaks on the island.

In 1973 Burley retired from the Royal Navy to take up a post as bursar at Stowe School.
