= Walker Point =

Headland of Antarctica

Coordinates: 61°8′S 54°42′W

Location of Elephant Island in the South Shetland Islands

Map of Elephant Island

Walker Point is a point on the southwest side of the entrance to Gurkovska Cove which lies 6 km (3.7 mi) south-west of Cape Valentine, near the eastern end of Elephant Island in the South Shetland Islands of Antarctica. The name appears on Powell's map of 1822 based upon the joint cruise of Captain Nathaniel B. Palmer, in the sloop James Monroe with Captain George Powell, in the sloop Dove, in December 1821. It was probably named for Captain John Walker, whose assistance in the construction of the map was acknowledged by Powell.

== Important Bird Area ==
A 31 ha site comprising all the ice-free ground at a small unnamed point, unofficially referred to as ‘Chinstrap Camp', 2.7 km south-west of Walker Point, has been designated an Important Bird Area (IBA) by BirdLife International because it supports a colony of about 24,000 pairs of chinstrap penguins.
