= Cape Valentine =

Cape in the South Shetland Islands, Antarctica

Coordinates: 61°6′S 54°39′W

Location of Elephant Island in the South Shetland Islands

Map of Elephant Island

Cape Valentine is a cape on the northeast side of Gurkovska Cove forming the northeast extremity of Elephant Island in the South Shetland Islands of Antarctica. The name was in use by American and British sealers as early as 1822 and is now well established.
