= Cape Yelcho =

Coordinates: 61.001°S 55.285°W

Elephant Island map, Cape Yelcho at the northwest

Cape Yelcho is the northwestern extremity of Elephant Island in the South Shetland Islands of Antarctica. It was named by the UK Joint Services Expedition, 1970–71, after the Chilean steam tug Yelcho.

The tug, which was commanded by Luis Pardo, rescued members of Ernest Shackleton's stranded party from nearby Point Wild in August 1916.
