= Point Wild =

Point on Elephant Island

Coordinates: 61°6′S 54°52′W

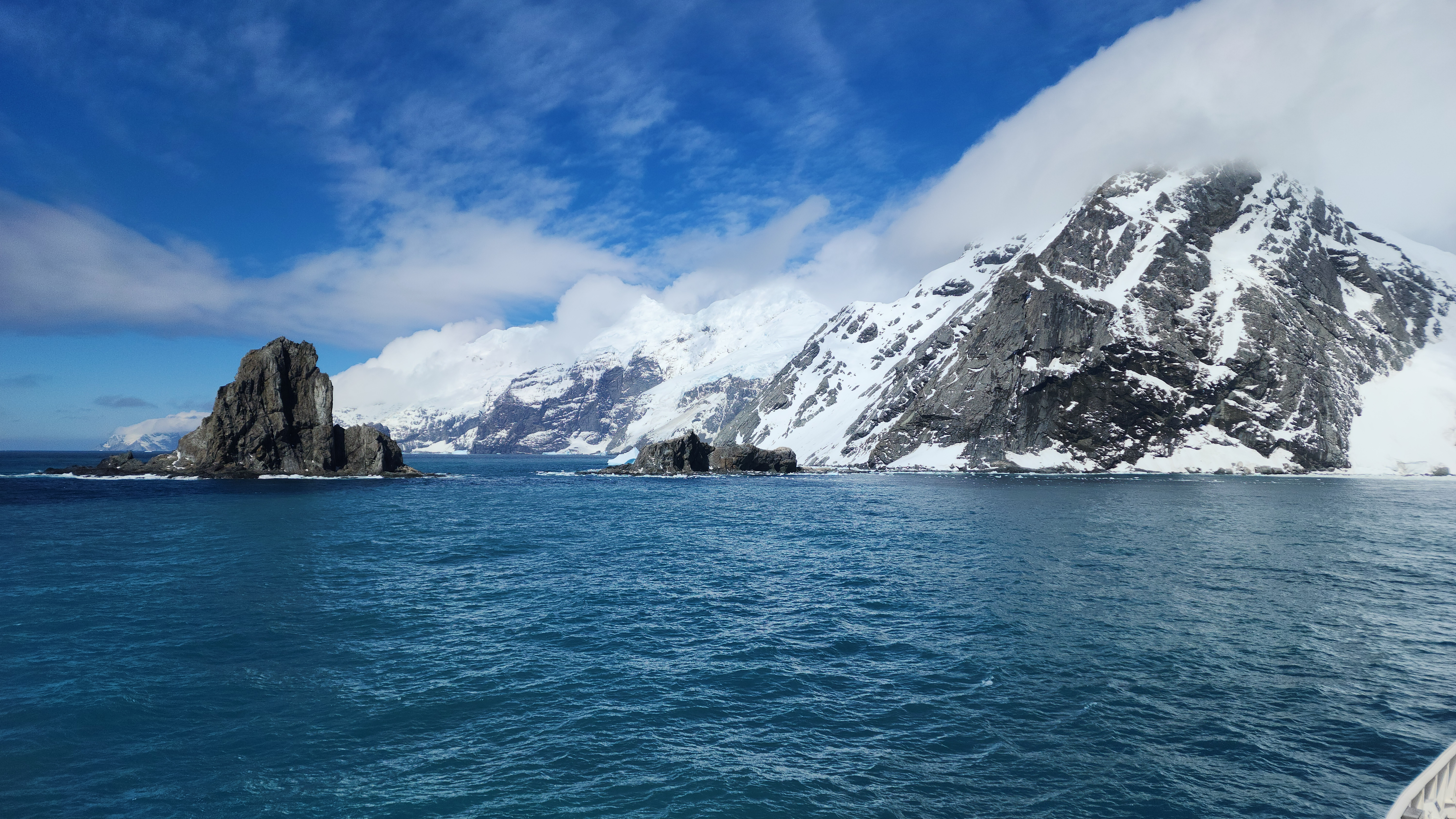
Point Wild, December 2025

Point Wild is a point 11 kilometers (6.8 miles) west of Cape Valentine on the North coast of Elephant Island in the South Shetland Islands. It lies 2 kilometres (1.2 miles) east of Saddleback Point, and directly adjacent to the Furness Glacier. Its exact coordinates are 61°05'53.0''S and 54°51'39.3''W.

It was named for Frank Wild, leader of the party from Shackleton's Endurance shipwrecked expedition which camped and managed to survive on the point for four and a half months until they were rescued on 30 August 1916 by the Chilean Naval vessel Yelcho commanded by Captain Luis Alberto Pardo.

== Historic site ==
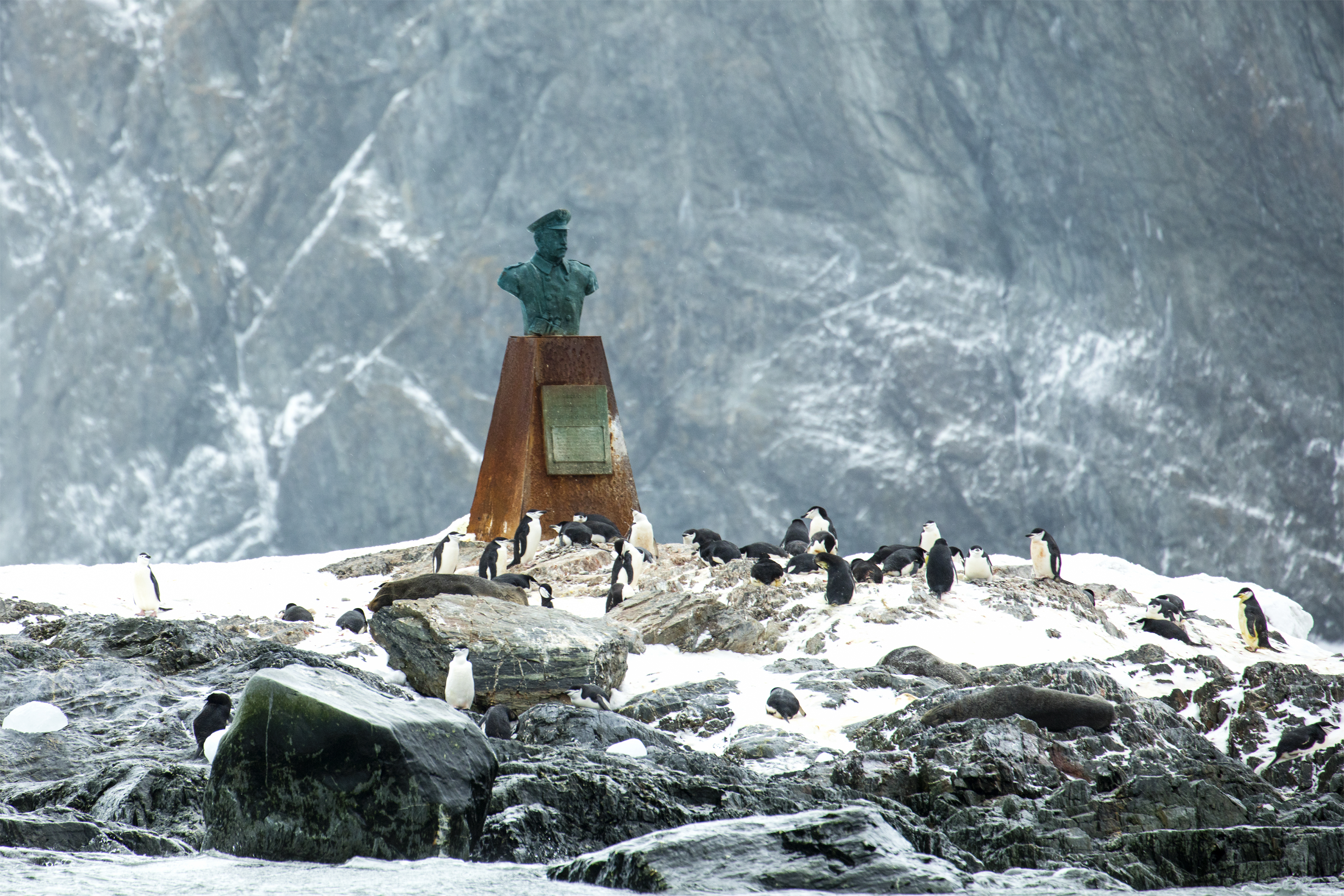
Bust of Captain Luis Pardo Villalón

A bust of Captain Luis Alberto Pardo, with a monolith and plaques, has been placed at the point to celebrate the rescue of the survivors of the Endurance by the Yelcho. The Spanish inscription reads:

La Armada de Chile en hommaje al piloto 2.° Luis Pardo Villalon

Comandante de la escampavia "Yelcho", quien, el 30 de agosto de 1916 rescato de la isla elefante a los naufragos del "Endurance" nave de la expedicion Britanica de Sir Ernest Shackleton que fue destrozad por los hielos y hundida el 21 de noviembre de 1915.

Isla Elefante enero 1988

Which translates to:

The Chilean Navy pays tribute to Second Pilot Luis Pardo Villalon

Commander of the patrol boat ‘Yelcho’, who, on 30 August 1916, rescued the shipwrecked crew of the ‘Endurance’, Sir Ernest Shackleton's British expedition ship, from Elephant Island. The ship had been crushed by ice and sank on 21 November 1915.

Elephant Island, January 1988

The monolith and plaques, along with replicas at the Chilean Antarctic research stations of Capitan Arturo Prat and President Eduardo Frei, were surmounted with the bronze busts of Pardo during the XXIVth Chilean Antarctic Scientific Expedition in 1987–88. The installation at the point has been designated a Historic Site or Monument (HSM 53), following a proposal by Chile to the Antarctic Treaty Consultative Meeting.

== See also ==
- Houlder Bluff, a bluff overlooking Point Wild
