= South Georgia =

Island in the South Atlantic Ocean

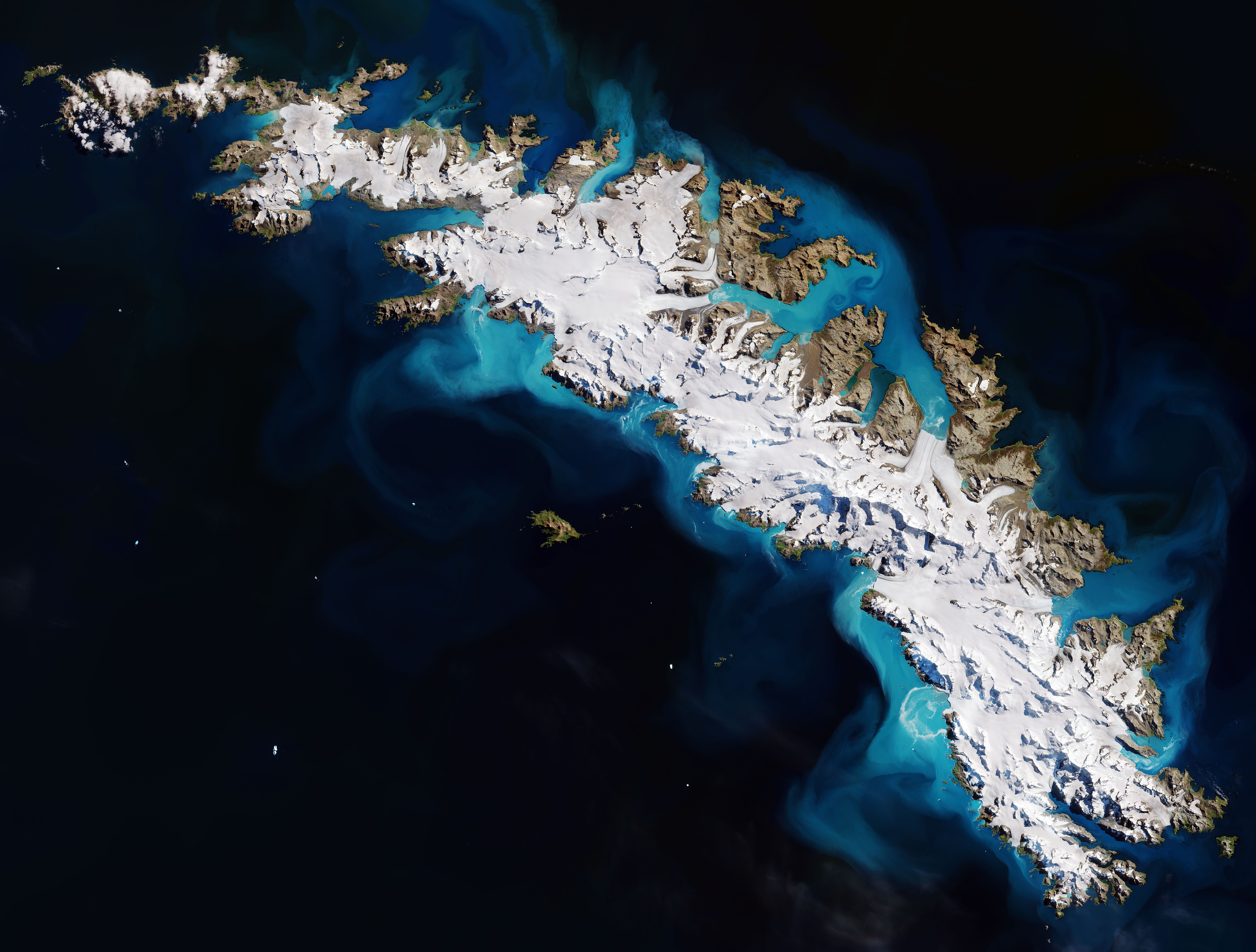
- February 2018 ESA satellite photograph of South Georgia

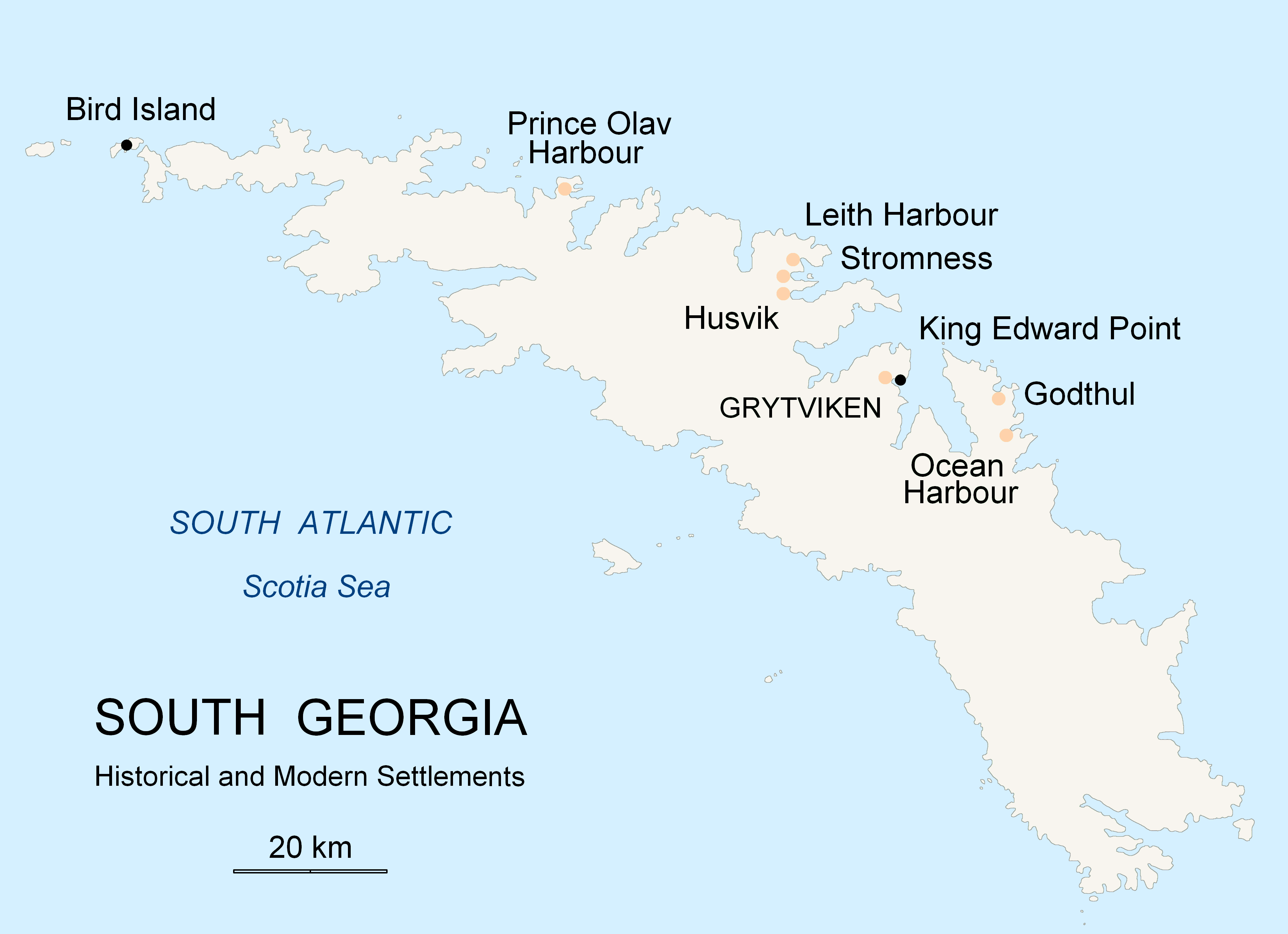
- Map of South Georgia Island

Geography
- Location: South Atlantic Ocean
- Coordinates: 54.4°S 36.7°W
- Archipelago: South Georgia Group
- Area: 3,528 km^{2} (1,362 sq mi)
- Length: 170 km (106 mi)
- Width: 35 km (21.7 mi)
- Highest elevation: 2,934 m (9626 ft)
- Highest point: Mount Paget

Administration
- United Kingdom
- Overseas Territory: South Georgia and the South Sandwich Islands
- Largest settlement: King Edward Point

Demographics
- Population: 32 (summer); 16 (winter); 30 (1945)

South Georgia, formerly known as Roche Island and later Isle of Georgia, is an island in the South Atlantic Ocean that is part of the British Overseas Territory of South Georgia and the South Sandwich Islands. It lies around 1,400 kilometres (870 mi; 756 nmi) east of the Falkland Islands. Stretching in the east–west direction, South Georgia is around 170 kilometres (106 mi) long and has a maximum width of 35 kilometres (22 mi). The terrain is mountainous, with the central ridge rising to 2,935 metres (9,629 ft) at Mount Paget. The northern coast is indented with numerous bays and fjords, serving as harbours.

Discovered by Europeans in 1675, South Georgia had no indigenous population due to its harsh climate and remoteness. Captain James Cook in HMS Resolution made the first landing, survey and mapping of the island. On 17 January 1775, Cook claimed it a British possession, naming it "Isle of Georgia" after King George III. Through its history, it served as a whaling and seal hunting base, with intermittent population scattered in several whaling bases, the most important historically being Grytviken. The main settlement and the capital today is King Edward Point near Grytviken, a British Antarctic Survey research station, with a population of about 20 people.

== History ==
The island of South Georgia was probably discovered in 1675 by Anthony de la Roché, a London merchant, and was named Roche Island on a number of early maps. It was sighted by a commercial Spanish ship named León operating out of Saint-Malo on 28 or 29 June 1756. According to Argentine and some Brazilian historians, it was explored on 29 June 1756, St Peter's Day, hence its Spanish and Portuguese names Isla San Pedro and Ilha São Pedro, literally 'St Peter's Island'.

The mariner Captain James Cook in HMS Resolution made the first landing, survey and mapping of South Georgia. As mandated by the Admiralty, on 17 January 1775 he took possession for Britain and renamed the island 'Isle of Georgia' for King George III.

After making a foot crossing of the island with Tom Crean and Frank Worsley, Ernest Shackleton organised the rescue of his party from Elephant Island following the disaster that befell the 1916 Imperial Trans-Antarctic Expedition, which he led. He is buried in the cemetery at Grytviken alongside Frank Wild.

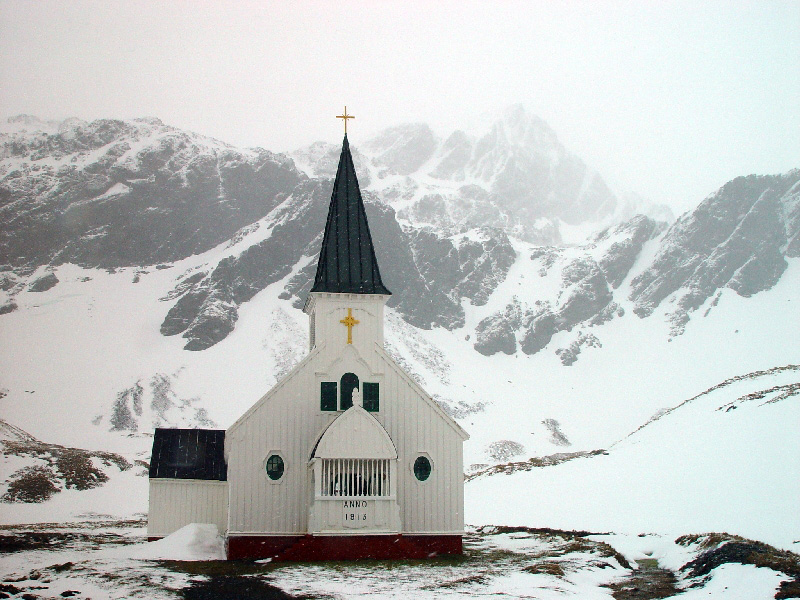
Church at Grytviken

Commercial sealing was conducted on the island between 1786 and 1913. During that period 131 sealing visits are recorded, eight of which ended when the vessel was wrecked. Modern industrial sealing associated with whaling stations was carried out between 1909 and 1964. Sealing era relics include iron try pots, hut ruins, graves and inscriptions.

The Grytviken Church was built in 1913, as part of the Church of Norway. It was formally handed over to the Church of England in 2013. The South Georgia Museum was established on the island in 1992.

=== Surveying by Carse ===
The island was surveyed by explorer Duncan Carse. He organised and led the South Georgia Survey of 1951–1957, surveying much of the interior of the island. Mount Carse and Carse Point are named after him. In 1961 he lived as a hermit in a remote part of South Georgia. Carse built a house at Ducloz Head on the southern coast of the island, intending to live there through the winter. However, in May, three months into the experiment, surge waves destroyed his camp. He managed to salvage enough gear to survive the winter until making contact with a ship 116 days later.

=== Argentine occupation ===
On 19 March 1982, a group of Argentinians arrived at Leith Harbour and raised the Argentine flag on the island. On 3 April, the second day of the Falklands War, Argentine naval forces occupied the island. South Georgia was retaken by British forces on 25 April during Operation Paraquet.

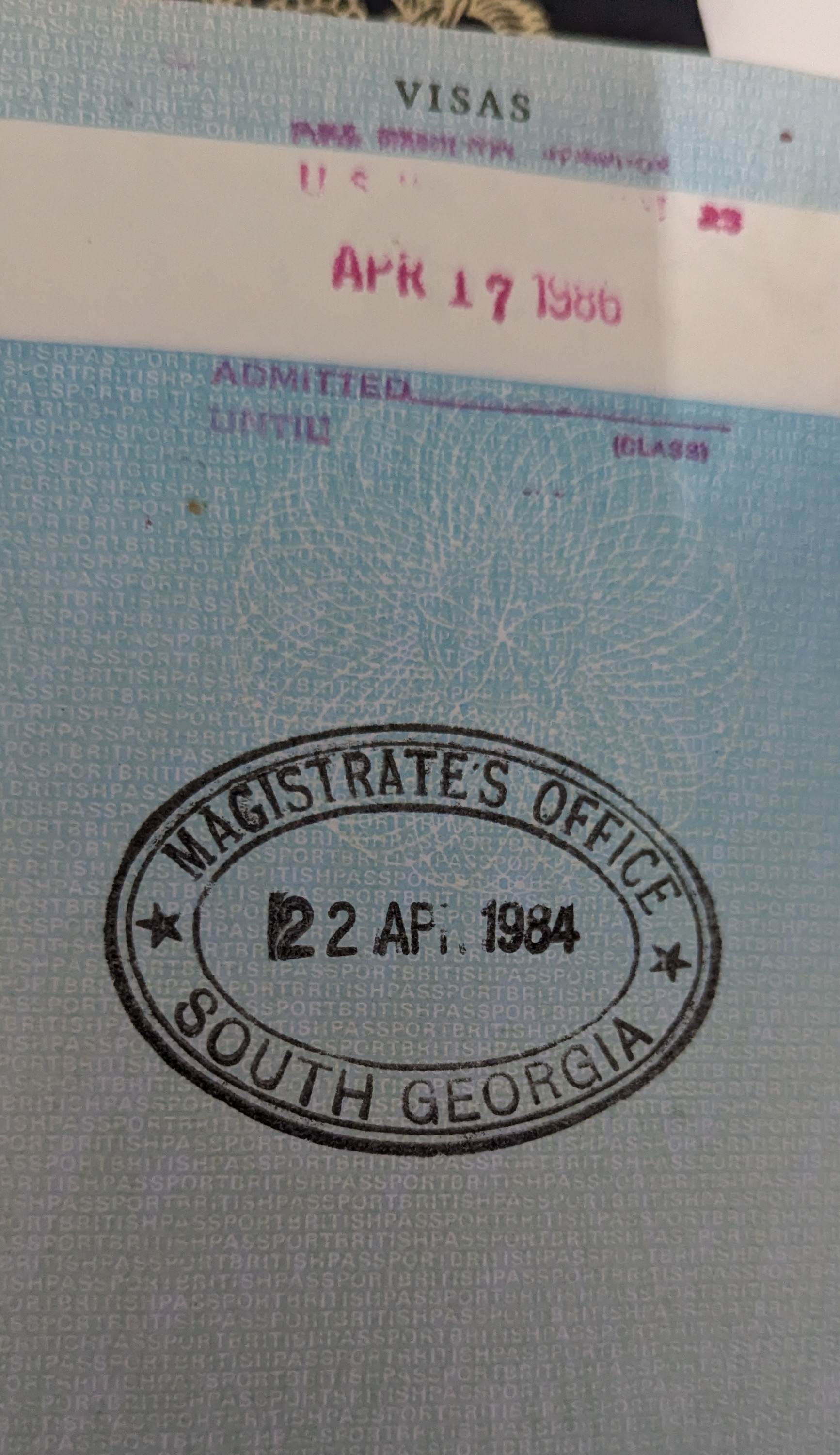
South Georgia passport entry stamp, issued by the Post Office in Grytviken 1984

== Geography ==
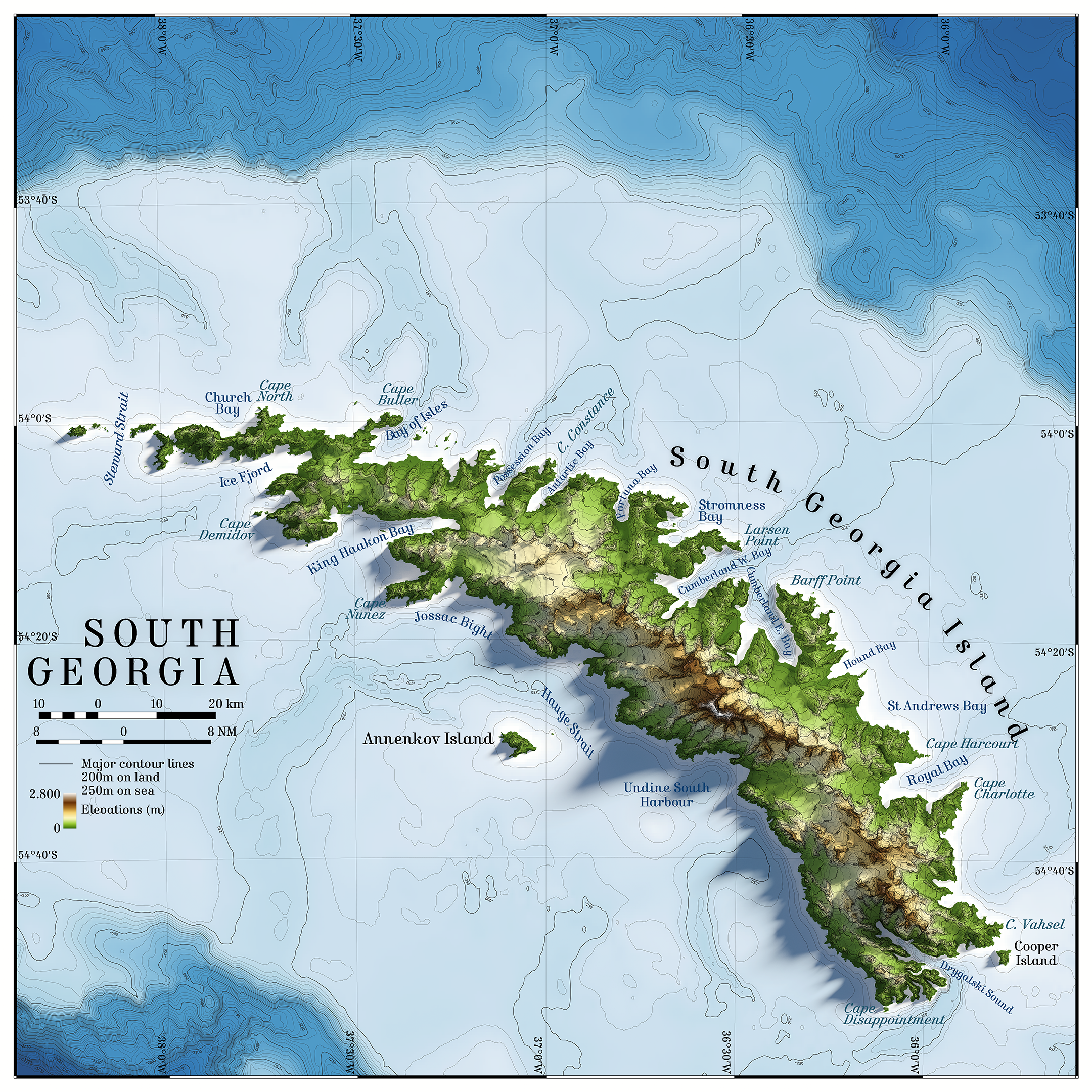
Topographic map of the Island of South Georgia

Stretching in the east–west direction, South Georgia is around 170 kilometres (106 mi) long and has a maximum width of 35 kilometres (22 mi). The terrain is mountainous, with the central ridge rising to 2,935 metres (9,629 ft) at Mount Paget. The northern coast is indented with numerous bays and fjords, serving as harbours.

The island's topography includes a stepped sequence of flat surfaces interpreted as wave-cut platforms formed when sea level was higher relative to the island. At sea level, strandflats have been described.

The main settlement and the capital today is King Edward Point near Grytviken, a British Antarctic Survey research station, with a population of about 20 people.

== Flora and fauna ==
South Georgia is a breeding ground for elephant seals, fur seals, and king penguins. The island is home to the South Georgia pintail and the South Georgia pipit, which are endemic to the island. The island is home to one of the largest populations of king penguins.

The island lies in the path of large icebergs drifting northward from Antarctica. Iceberg A-38 grounded off the island in 2004, resulting in indirect but severe effects on local wildlife by disturbing life on the seafloor and blocking foraging routes of seals and penguins. In 2020, the colossal 4,200-square-kilometre (1,600 sq mi) Iceberg A-68, similar in size to the island itself, was initially believed to be on a similar collision course but broke apart before collision with the island.

There are 25 native vascular plants on South Georgia, and 76 non-native species have been recorded.

=== Invasive species ===
In 2013, teams of Norwegian government shooters and Sámi reindeer herders culled all 3,500 reindeer on the island. The animals had been introduced by Norwegian whalers in the early 20th century for food and sport hunting, but were later seen as a pest, damaging the island's flora and wider ecosystem. Karl Erik Kilander, the project manager, said the culled reindeer were frozen and taken to the Falkland Islands where they were sold to local residents and cruise ship operators.

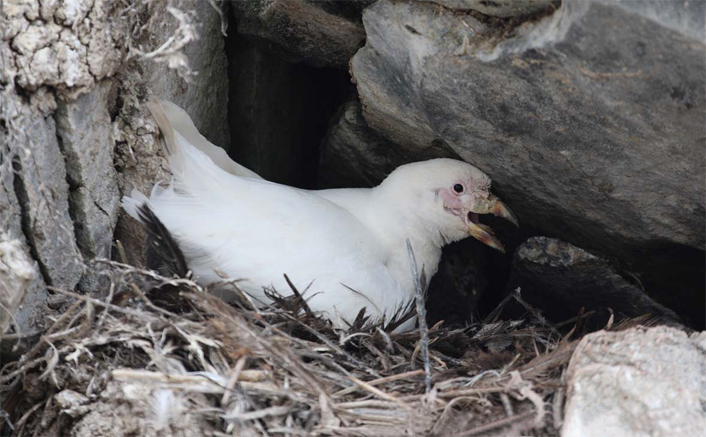
Snowy sheathbill in nest

In 2018, after a multiyear extermination effort, the island was declared free of invasive rodents and the number of South Georgia pipits had clearly increased. In the central north coast, five years after poisoning the rats, the populations of snowy sheathbills, South Georgia pintails and Wilson's storm petrels had grown.

In addition, two predatory ground beetles have been introduced to the island: Merizodus soledadinus, first recorded in 1963 at Grytviken and Husvik, and Trechisibus antarcticus, first recorded in 1982 at Husvik. Both species continue to expand their ranges and have a documented negative impact on populations of native invertebrates in invaded areas.

== Climate ==
The island's climate is classified as ET or polar tundra climate by the Köppen-Geiger classification system. There is generally snow on the island during the winter months (April–November).

The terrain is mountainous, with a central ridge and many fjords and bays along the coast. The island has no tree cover.

Climate data for Grytviken/King Edward Point (1991–2020 normals, extremes 1922–2023)
Month	Jan	Feb	Mar	Apr	May	Jun	Jul	Aug	Sep	Oct	Nov	Dec	Year
Record high °C (°F)	22.8 (73.0)	22.4 (72.3)	28.8 (83.8)	20.8 (69.4)	17.6 (63.7)	14.2 (57.6)	14.9 (58.8)	13.5 (56.3)	15.5 (59.9)	20.2 (68.4)	20.4 (68.7)	27.1 (80.8)	28.8 (83.8)
Mean daily maximum °C (°F)	10.3 (50.5)	10.6 (51.1)	9.3 (48.7)	6.3 (43.3)	3.6 (38.5)	2.4 (36.3)	1.8 (35.2)	2.8 (37.0)	4.8 (40.6)	7.0 (44.6)	8.8 (47.8)	9.9 (49.8)	6.5 (43.6)
Daily mean °C (°F)	5.8 (42.4)	6.1 (43.0)	5.2 (41.4)	2.6 (36.7)	0.4 (32.7)	−0.4 (31.3)	−1.3 (29.7)	−0.7 (30.7)	0.8 (33.4)	2.8 (37.0)	4.4 (39.9)	5.4 (41.7)	2.6 (36.7)
Mean daily minimum °C (°F)	2.4 (36.3)	2.6 (36.7)	1.9 (35.4)	−0.2 (31.6)	−2.3 (27.9)	−3.1 (26.4)	−4.3 (24.3)	−3.7 (25.3)	−2.4 (27.7)	−0.8 (30.6)	0.9 (33.6)	2.1 (35.8)	−0.6 (31.0)
Record low °C (°F)	−2.1 (28.2)	−2.7 (27.1)	−3.7 (25.3)	−6.9 (19.6)	−9.8 (14.4)	−10.1 (13.8)	−15.1 (4.8)	−12.4 (9.7)	−10.9 (12.4)	−9.2 (15.4)	−5.6 (21.9)	−3.0 (26.6)	−15.1 (4.8)
Average precipitation mm (inches)	92 (3.6)	114 (4.5)	136 (5.4)	139 (5.5)	137 (5.4)	135 (5.3)	149 (5.9)	149 (5.9)	92 (3.6)	80 (3.1)	93 (3.7)	88 (3.5)	1,394 (54.9)
Average precipitation days (≥ 0.1 mm)	12	13	14	14	12	15	15	14	11	12	11	11	154
Average relative humidity (%)	72	69	69	70	74	75	74	73	72	70	69	71	72
Mean monthly sunshine hours	152	160	127	66	34	12	22	74	123	171	174	167	1,282
Source 1: Globalbioclimatics/Salvador Rivas-Martínez (precipitation 1901–1950) DMI/Danish Meteorology Institute (sun, humidity, and precipitation days 1931–1960) Météo Climat (extremes)
Source 2: Starlings Roost Weather

Climate data for Bird Island (Köppen ET)
Month	Jan	Feb	Mar	Apr	May	Jun	Jul	Aug	Sep	Oct	Nov	Dec	Year
Record high °C (°F)	11.2 (52.2)	10.7 (51.3)	10.5 (50.9)	10.2 (50.4)	6.9 (44.4)	6.0 (42.8)	5.9 (42.6)	4.8 (40.6)	7.5 (45.5)	10.4 (50.7)	9.1 (48.4)	9.4 (48.9)	11.2 (52.2)
Mean daily maximum °C (°F)	5.5 (41.9)	5.6 (42.1)	4.4 (39.9)	1.9 (35.4)	−0.5 (31.1)	−1.8 (28.8)	−2.4 (27.7)	−1.9 (28.6)	−0.2 (31.6)	1.6 (34.9)	3.4 (38.1)	4.5 (40.1)	1.7 (35.0)
Daily mean °C (°F)	3.1 (37.6)	3.5 (38.3)	2.5 (36.5)	0.4 (32.7)	−2.1 (28.2)	−3.2 (26.2)	−3.9 (25.0)	−3.3 (26.1)	−1.8 (28.8)	−0.2 (31.6)	1.0 (33.8)	2.0 (35.6)	−0.2 (31.7)
Mean daily minimum °C (°F)	0.7 (33.3)	1.4 (34.5)	0.6 (33.1)	−1 (30)	−3.8 (25.2)	−4.6 (23.7)	−5.4 (22.3)	−4.8 (23.4)	−3.4 (25.9)	−1.9 (28.6)	−1.5 (29.3)	−0.6 (30.9)	−2.0 (28.4)
Record low °C (°F)	−2 (28)	−1.7 (28.9)	−3.2 (26.2)	−4.6 (23.7)	−7.3 (18.9)	−8.5 (16.7)	−11.4 (11.5)	−10.6 (12.9)	−8.5 (16.7)	−6.6 (20.1)	−4.3 (24.3)	−2.8 (27.0)	−11.4 (11.5)
Average precipitation mm (inches)	84 (3.3)	80 (3.1)	95 (3.7)	123 (4.8)	108 (4.3)	108 (4.3)	120 (4.7)	114 (4.5)	107 (4.2)	98 (3.9)	88 (3.5)	77 (3.0)	1,204 (47.4)
Source 1: Climatic Research Unit, UEA
Source 2: Météo Climat

== See also ==
- Anthony de la Roché
- List of landforms of South Georgia
- Ryan Reef
- Storer Reef
- Sutton Crag
- Whalers Passage
- Shag Rocks
- Black Rock
