= Cape Lookout (South Shetland Islands) =

Headland of Antarctica

Coordinates: 61°16′S 55°12′W

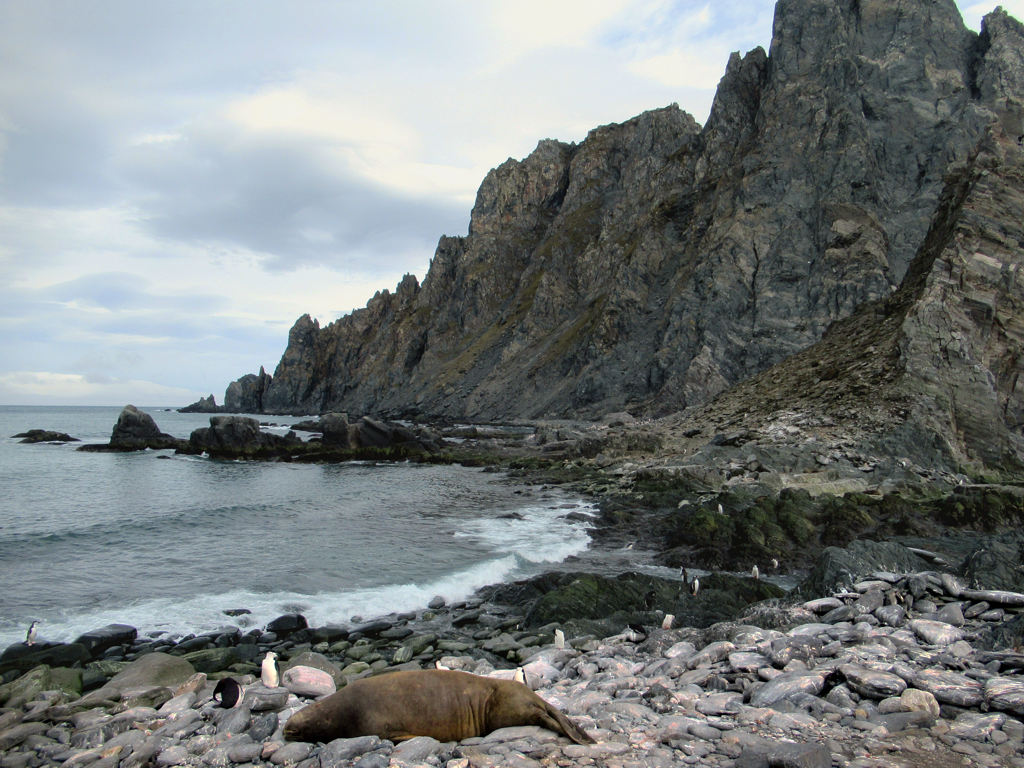
Cape Lookout Beach

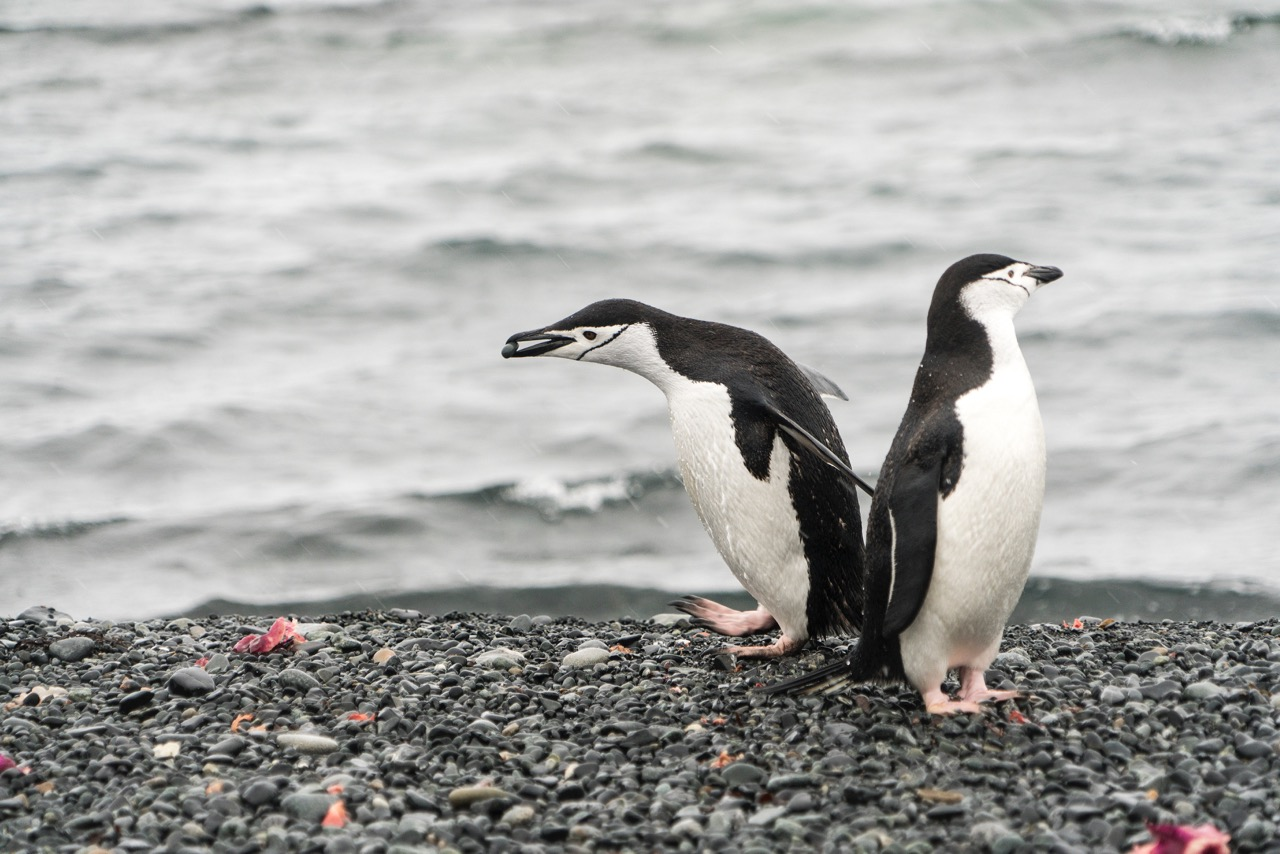
Chinstrap penguins breed in the IBA

Cape Lookout, also known as Cabo Fossatti or Cabo Vigia, is a steep cape, 240 m high, marking the southern extremity of Elephant Island in the South Shetland Islands of Antarctica. The name Cape Lookout appears on a map of 1822 by Captain George Powell, a British sealer, and is now established in international usage.

== Important Bird Area ==
The site has been identified as an Important Bird Area (IBA) by BirdLife International because it supports a large breeding colony of about 12,000 pairs of chinstrap penguins.
