= Joint Services Expedition to Elephant Island =

British surveying and mountaineering expedition to Antarctica, 1970-71

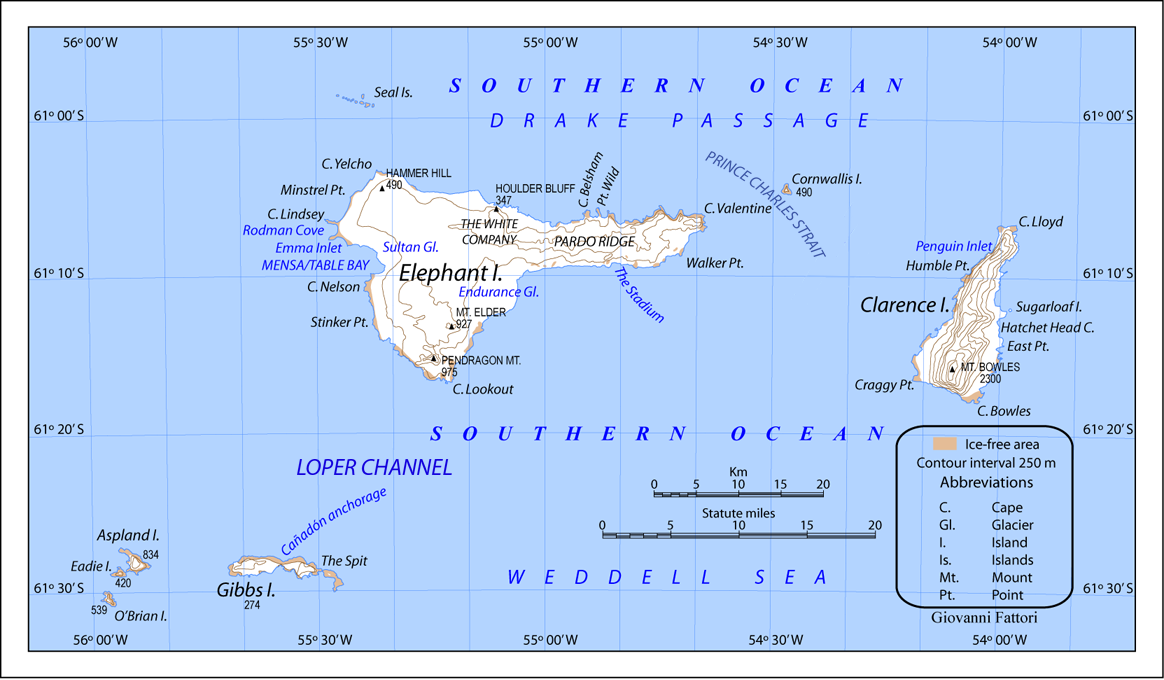
Map of Elephant and nearby islands

The Joint Services Expedition to Elephant Island was a British scientific surveying and mountaineering expedition to Elephant Island in the South Shetland Islands of Antarctica. It took place from December 1970 to March 1971. Except for one civilian from the British Antarctic Survey, the 14 participants were serving members of the British Armed Forces under the leadership of Commander Malcolm Burley of the Royal Navy. The expedition was sponsored by the Joint Services Expedition Trust with the aim of climbing, exploring and carrying out a preliminary scientific survey of islands in the Elephant group for the Directorate of Overseas Surveys. The expedition was transported to and from the island by HMS Endurance. During the course of the expedition several mountains were climbed for the first time and numerous place-names were recommended for geographic features on the island.
