= Elephant Island =

Island off the coast of Antarctica

Elephant
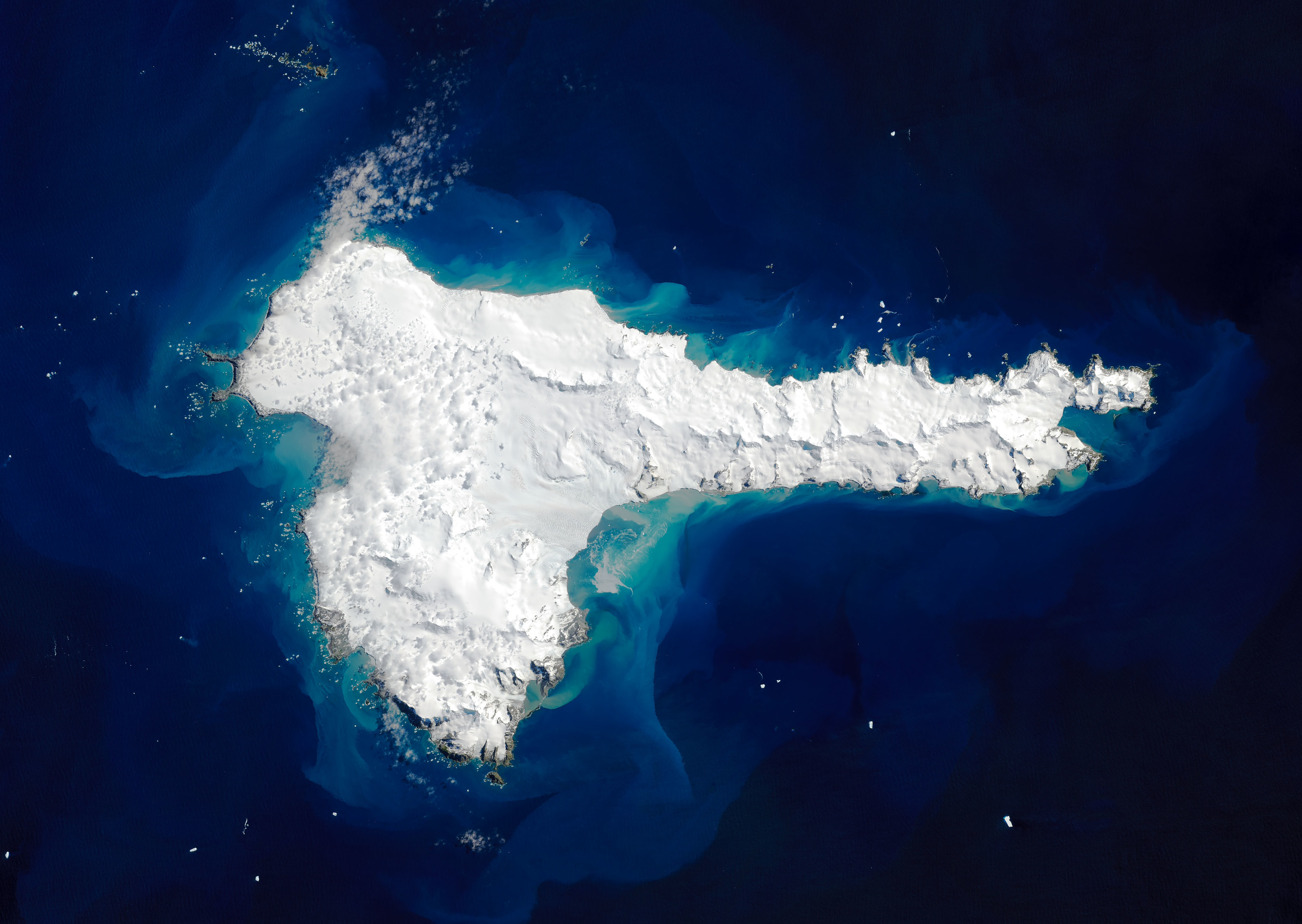

- Location within South Shetland Islands Location within Antarctica

Geography
- Location: Antarctica
- Coordinates: 61.14°S 55.12°W
- Archipelago: South Shetland Islands
- Area: 558 km^{2} (215 sq mi)
- Length: 47 km (29.2 mi)
- Width: 27 km (16.8 mi)
- Highest elevation: 973 m (3192 ft)
- Highest point: Mount Pendragon

Administration
- Administered under the Antarctic Treaty

Demographics
- Population: Uninhabited

Elephant Island is an ice-covered, mountainous island off the coast of Antarctica in the outer reaches of the South Shetland Islands, in the Southern Ocean. The island is situated 245 kilometres (152 miles) north-northeast of the tip of the Antarctic Peninsula, 1,253 kilometres (779 miles) west-southwest of South Georgia, 935 kilometres (581 miles) south of the Falkland Islands, and 885 kilometres (550 miles) southeast of Cape Horn. It is within the Antarctic claims of Argentina, Chile and the United Kingdom.

The Brazilian Antarctic Program maintains a shelter on the island, Goeldi, and formerly had another (Wiltgen) supporting the work of up to six researchers each during the summer. Wiltgen was dismantled in the summers of 1997 and 1998.

== Toponym ==
Elephant Island's name is attributed to both its elephant head-like appearance and the sighting of elephant seals by Captain George Powell in 1821, one of the earliest sightings. In Russia, it is still known by the name given by its discoverers in 1821, Mordvinov Island.

== Geography ==
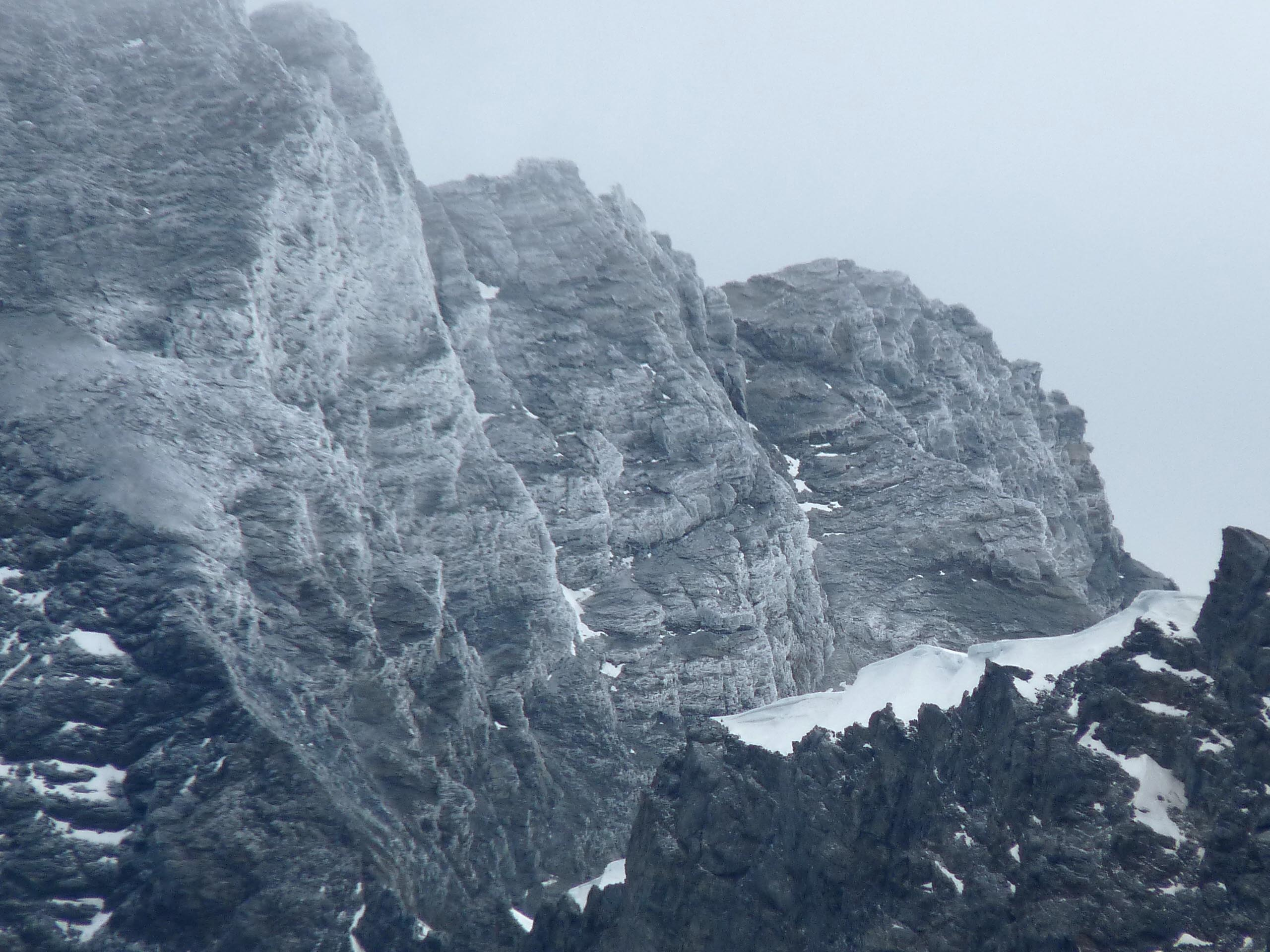
Elephant Island

Elephant Island marks the western end of the South Scotia Ridge. The island is oriented approximately east–west, with a maximum elevation of 973 m (3,192 ft) at Mount Pendragon. The weather is normally foggy with much snow, and winds can reach 160 km/h (100 mph).

Significant named features are Cape Yelcho, Cape Valentine and Cape Lookout at the northeastern and southern extremes, and Point Wild, a spit on the north coast. The Endurance Glacier is the main discharge glacier.

== Geology ==
Elephant Island is part of the Scotia metamorphic complex, which was created by Cretaceous sea floor sediments being scraped off and metamorphosed at the Scotia subduction zone. The resulting rocks are phyllites, blueschists and greenschists typical of an accretionary wedge, with increased metamorphism from northeast to southwest. These rocks are at the surface here because of uplift along the Shackleton Fault Zone where it meets the South Scotia Ridge. This complex is very similar in age and rock types to those of coastal California, including Catalina Island and the Big Sur coast.

Elephant Island is the type locality for phosphate mineral spheniscidite.

== Flora and fauna ==
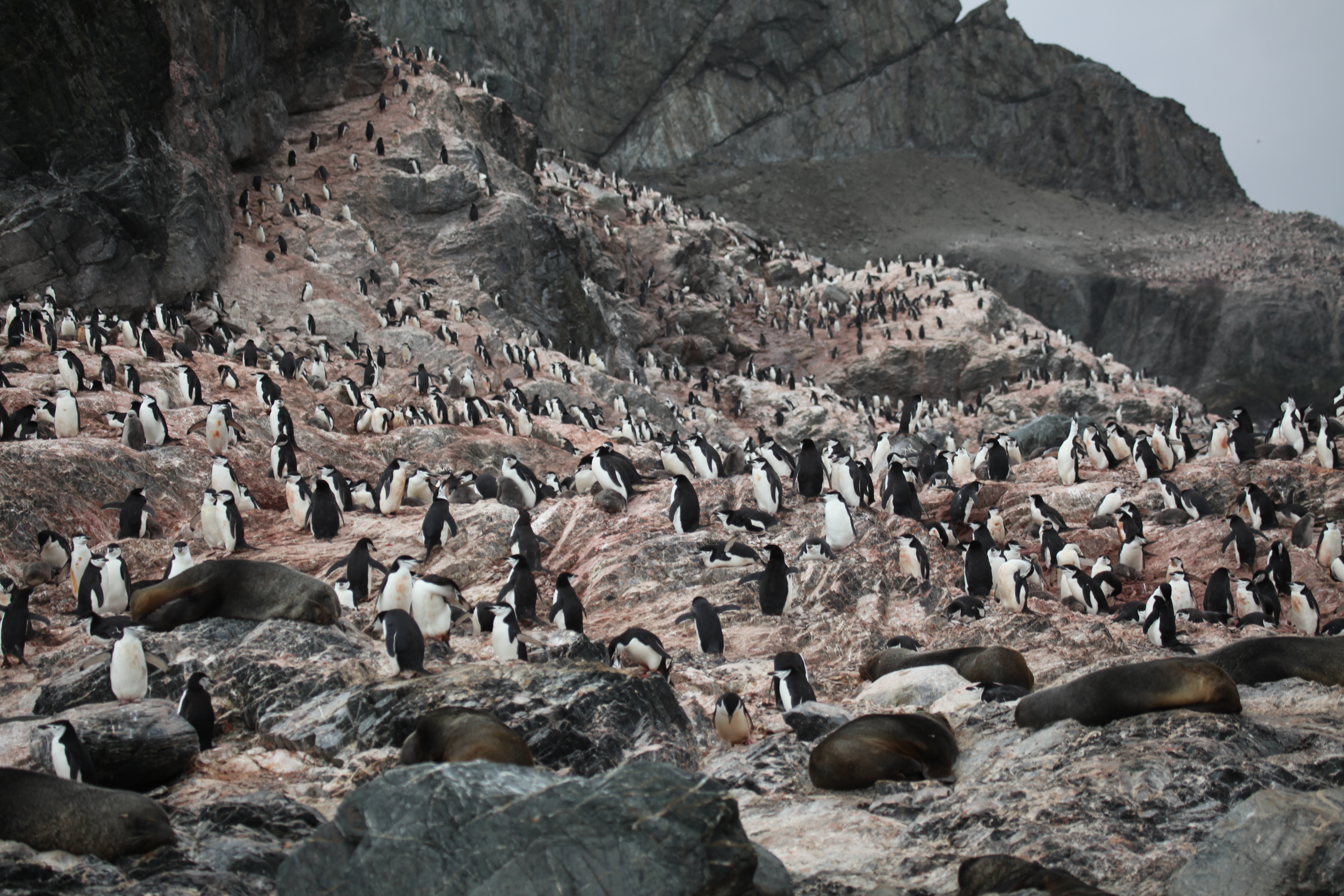
Chinstrap penguins and Antarctic fur seals at Point Wild, Elephant Island

The barren island supports no native terrestrial flora or fauna, although seasonal colonies of chinstrap, gentoo and macaroni penguins congregate in their thousands to mate and breed during warmer periods. Other seabirds found on the island include the Antarctic shag and tern, brown skua, Cape petrel, giant petrel, kelp gull, snowy sheathbill and Wilson's storm-petrel.

Antarctic fur seals, leopard seals and southern elephant seals are also found around the island seasonally; the latter two species often prey on the many inexperienced penguins learning to enter and exit the water.

A lack of safe anchorage has prevented any permanent human influence, despite the island being conveniently located to support potential scientific, fishing or whale watching endeavors. Due to past illegal whaling by the Soviet Union (with support from Japan), the number of southern right whales visiting Elephant Island is still in recovery. However, blue, fin and humpback whales may be sighted in the waters surrounding Elephant Island.

== History ==
=== First Russian Antarctic expedition ===
The First Russian Antarctic expedition led by Fabian Gottlieb von Bellingshausen and Mikhail Lazarev on the 985-ton sloop-of-war Vostok ("East") and the 530-ton support vessel Mirny ("Peaceful") discovered Elephant Island on 29 January 1821 and named it Mordvinov Island (Остров Мордвинова) in honour of Admiral Mordvinov.

=== Endurance expedition ===
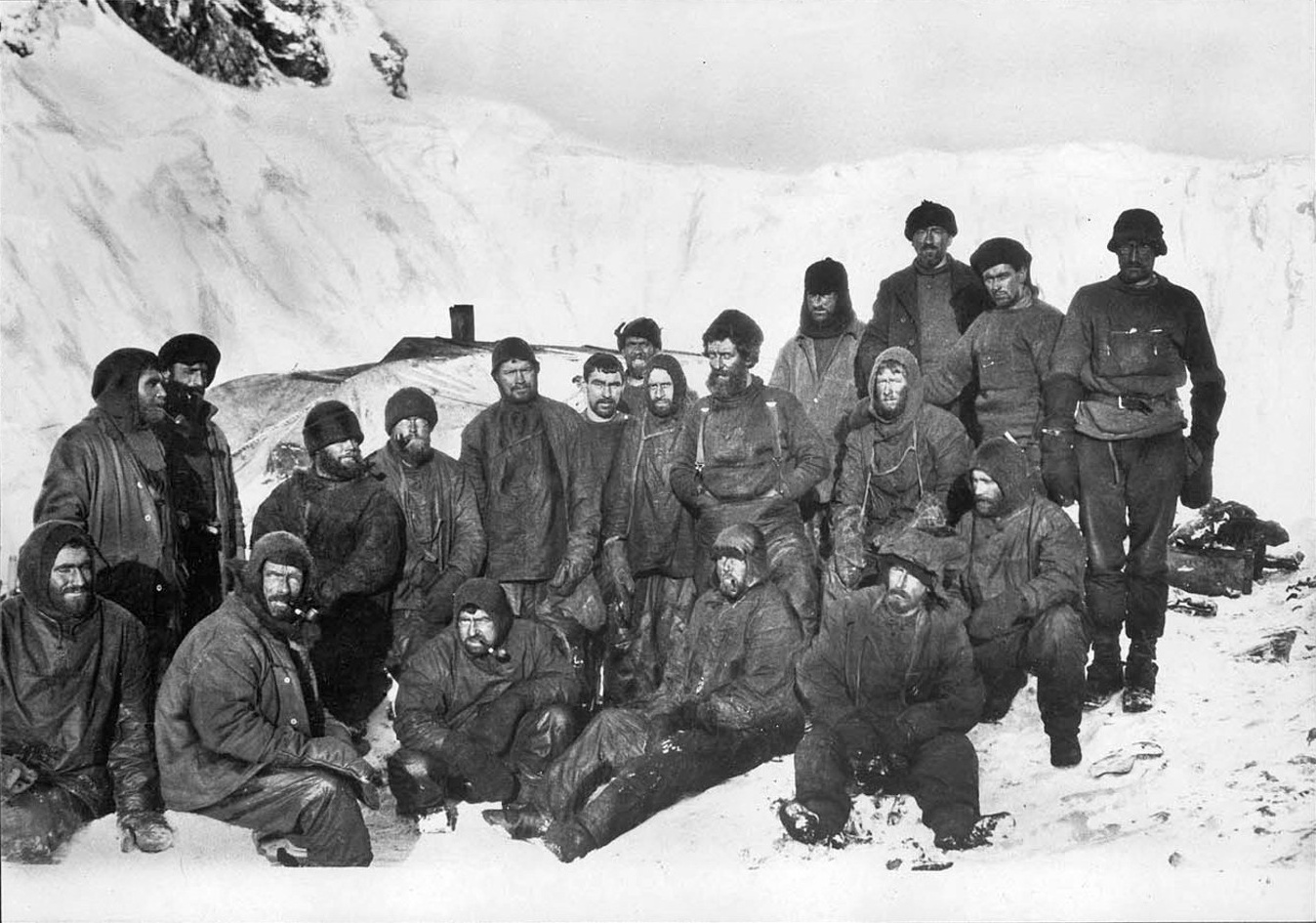
Elephant Island party, 1916

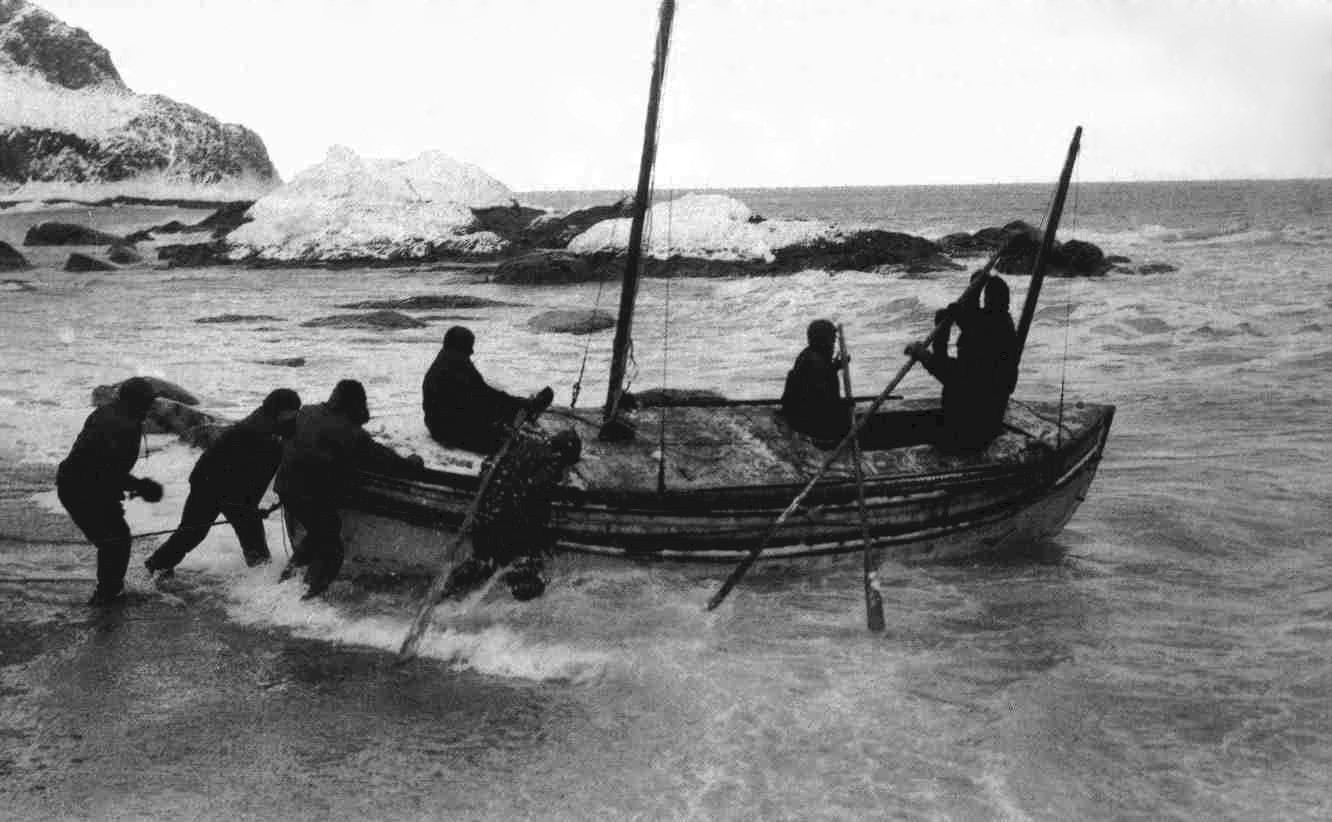
Launch of the James Caird from the shore of Elephant Island

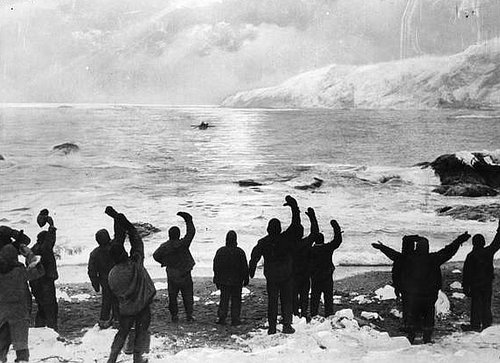
Shackleton leaves Elephant Island on the James Caird

The island was the refuge of explorer Ernest Shackleton and his crew in 1916 following the loss of their ship Endurance in the pack ice of the Weddell Sea. The crew of 28 reached Cape Valentine on Elephant Island after months spent drifting on ice floes and a harrowing crossing of the open ocean in small lifeboats. After camping at Cape Valentine for two nights, Shackleton and his crew moved 11 km (7 mi) west to a small, rocky spit at the terminus of a glacier, which offered better protection from rockfalls and from the sea, and which they called Point Wild.

Realizing that there was no chance of passive rescue, Shackleton decided to sail to South Georgia, where he knew there were several whaling stations. Shackleton sailed with Tom Crean, Frank Worsley, Harry "Chippy" McNish, Tim McCarthy, and John Vincent on a 1,300 km (800 mi) voyage in the lifeboat James Caird beginning on Easter Monday, April 24, 1916, and arriving at South Georgia 16 days later. His second-in-command, Frank Wild, was left in charge of the remaining party on Elephant Island, waiting for Shackleton's return with a rescue ship.

There was much work for the stranded men. Because the island had no natural shelter, they constructed a shack and wind blocks from their remaining two lifeboats and pieces of canvas tents. Blubber lamps were used for lighting. They hunted for penguins and seals, neither of which were plentiful in autumn or winter. Shackleton had instructed Wild to depart with the remaining crew for Deception Island if he did not return to rescue them by the beginning of summer. After four and a half months, on August 30, 1916, a ship, the tug Yelcho, from Punta Arenas, Chile, with Shackleton on board and commanded by Luis Pardo, arrived and rescued the men.

=== Joint Services Expeditions 1970–71 ===
A Joint Services Expedition led by Commander Malcolm Burley was dropped off on Elephant Island by HMS Endurance. The party then spent six months carrying out a survey of the island and other scientific research for the British Antarctic Survey and climbing some of the peaks on the island. The expedition visited Point Wild but found no trace of the Endurance expedition; it did, however, find the wreckage of a large sailing vessel, likely the remains of the schooner Charles Shearer from Stonington, New London, Connecticut, under Captain William Henry Appelman. The expedition also landed on and climbed the highest peak on nearby Clarence Island.

=== Historic sites ===
Point Wild contains the Endurance Memorial Site, an Antarctic Historic Site (HSM 53), with a bust of Captain Pardo and several plaques. Hampson Cove on the southwest coast of the island, including the foreshore and intertidal area, contains the wreckage of a large wooden sailing vessel; it has been designated a Historic Site or Monument (HSM 74), following a proposal by the United Kingdom to the Antarctic Treaty Consultative Meeting.

== Maps ==
Map of Elephant Island

- British Antarctic Territory. Scale 1:200000 topographic map. DOS 610 Series, Sheet W 61 54. Directorate of Overseas Surveys, Tolworth, UK, 1972.
- South Shetland Islands: Elephant, Clarence and Gibbs Islands. Scale 1:220000 topographic map. UK Antarctic Place-names Committee, 2009.
- Antarctic Digital Database (ADD). Scale 1:250000 topographic map of Antarctica. Scientific Committee on Antarctic Research (SCAR). Since 1993, regularly upgraded and updated.

== See also ==
- Composite Gazetteer of Antarctica
- The Cornet
- List of Antarctic and sub-Antarctic islands
- Minstrel Point
- Prince Charles Strait
- Scientific Committee on Antarctic Research
- Territorial claims in Antarctica

== Bibliography ==
- Antarctica Sydney: Reader's Digest, 1985.
- Child, Jack Antarctica and South American Geopolitics: Frozen Lebensraum New York: Praeger Publishers, 1988.
- Furse, Chris Elephant Island – An Antarctic Expedition Shrewsbury: Anthony Nelson Ltd, Shrewsbury, England, ISBN 0-904614-02-6.
- Mericq, Luis Antarctica: Chile's Claim. Washington: National Defense University, 1987.
- Pinochet de la Barra, Oscar La Antarctica Chilena Santiago: Editorial Andrés Bello, 1976.
- Stewart, Andrew Antarctica: An Encyclopedia London: McFarland and Co., 1990 (2 volumes).
- Worsley, Frank Shackleton's Boat Journey W.W. Norton & Co., 1933.
