= Gesha Point =

Location of Gesha Point in Antarctica

Location of Clarence Island in the South Shetland Islands.

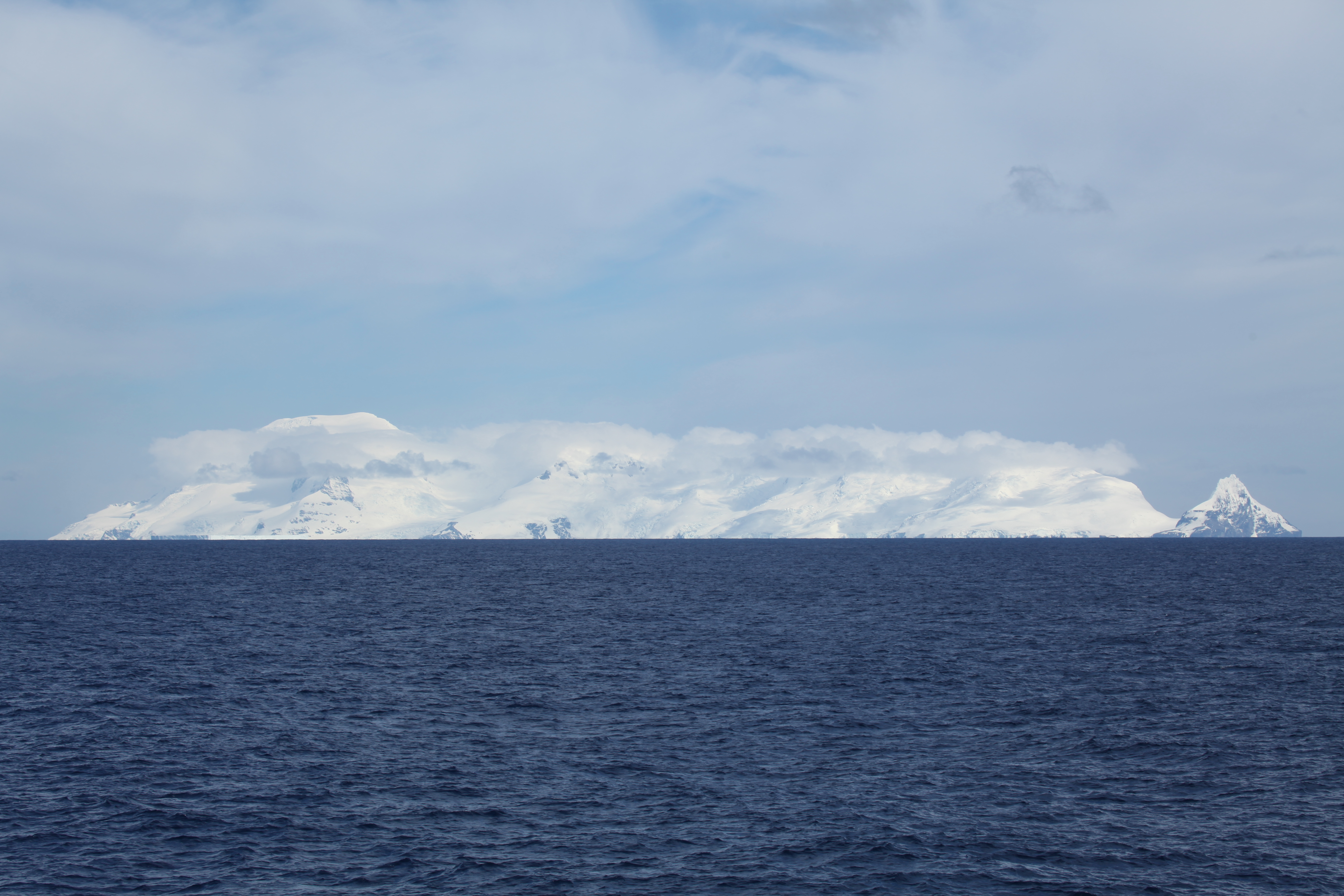
Clarence Island seen from northeast with (left to right) Cape Bowles; Dobrodan Glacier and Highton Glacier surmounted by Urda Ridge; Treskavets Glacier, Orcho Glacier and Banari Glacier surmounted by Ravelin Ridge; and Cape Lloyd.

Gesha Point (Bulgarian: нос Геша, ‘Nos Gesha’ \'nos 'ge-sha\) is the small point on the east coast of Clarence Island in the South Shetland Islands, Antarctica separating the glacier termini of Orcho Glacier to the north and Treskavets Glacier to the south.

The point is named after the settlement of Gesha in Northern Bulgaria.

== Location ==
Gesha Point is located at 61°12′26.3″S 54°03′39″W, which is 3.87 km southwest of Ilyo Point and 2.4 km northwest of Sugarloaf Island. British mapping in 1972 and 2009.

== Maps ==
- British Antarctic Territory. Scale 1:200000 topographic map. DOS 610 Series, Sheet W 61 54. Directorate of Overseas Surveys, Tolworth, UK, 1972.
- South Shetland Islands: Elephant, Clarence and Gibbs Islands. Scale 1:220000 topographic map. UK Antarctic Place-names Committee, 2009.
- Antarctic Digital Database (ADD). Scale 1:250000 topographic map of Antarctica. Scientific Committee on Antarctic Research (SCAR). Since 1993, regularly upgraded and updated.
