= Jubilee Peak =

Peak in the South Shetland Islands

Location of Clarence Island in the South Shetland Islands.

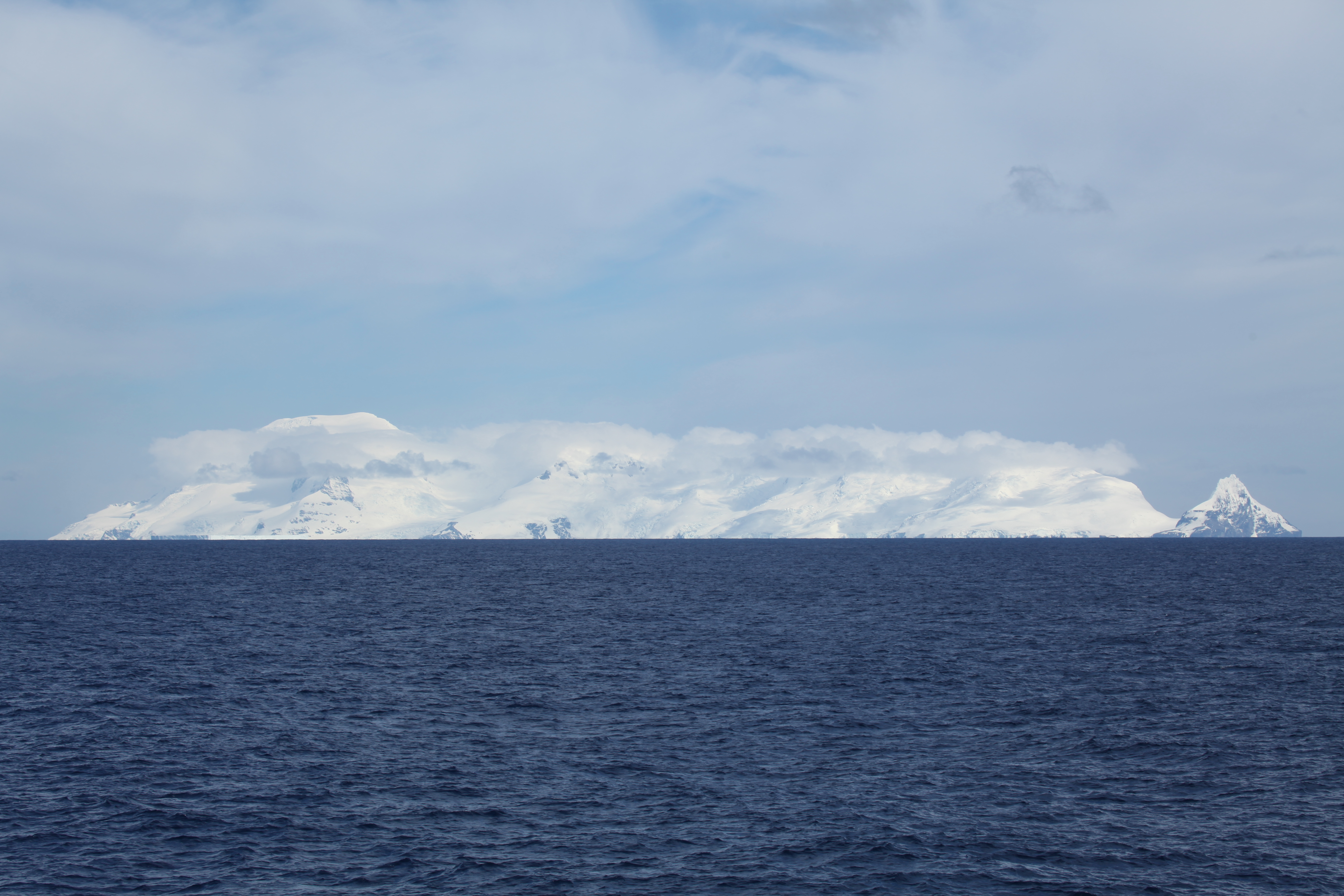
Clarence Island seen from northeast with (left to right) Cape Bowles; Dobrodan Glacier and Highton Glacier surmounted by Duclos-Guyot Bluff and Mount Irving; Treskavets Glacier, Orcho Glacier and Banari Glacier surmounted by Ravelin Ridge; and Cape Lloyd surmounted by Jubilee Peak.

Jubilee Peak (61°8′S 54°2′W) is a peak rising to about 500 metres (1,600 ft) at the north end of Clarence Island, west of Cape Lloyd, in the South Shetland Islands. Following the ascent of the peak by a JSEEIG party, February 2, 1977, it was named by the UK Antarctic Place-Names Committee in honor of the Silver Jubilee year of Her Majesty Queen Elizabeth II.

The team that carried out the first ascent was composed of Commander John Highton, Royal Navy (Leader), Captain Chris Hurran, Royal Engineers, and Lieutenant Mike Wimpenny, Royal Marines.
