= Duclos-Guyot Bluff =

Location of Clarence Island in the South Shetland Islands.

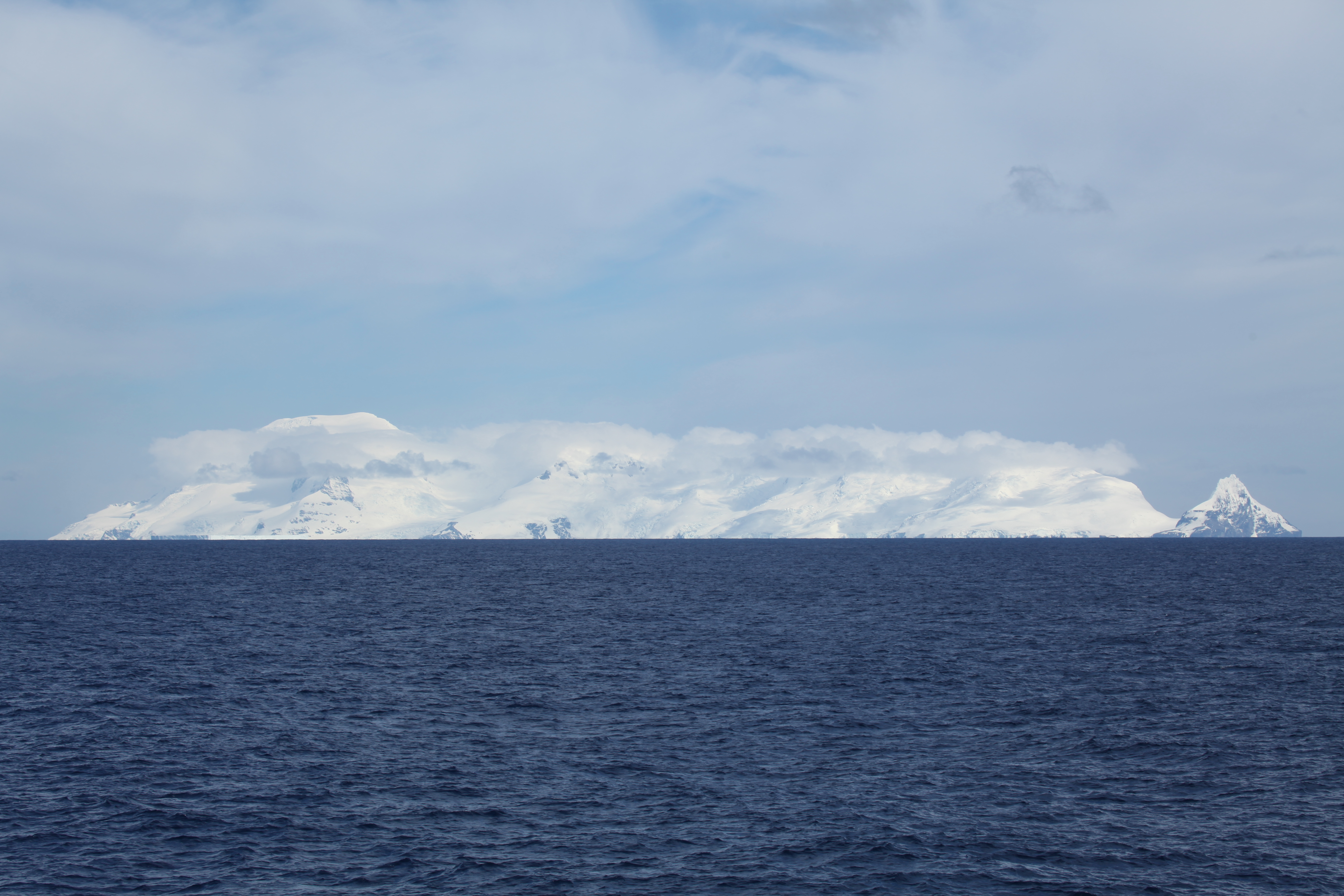
Clarence Island seen from northeast with (left to right) Cape Bowles; Dobrodan Glacier and Highton Glacier surmounted by Duclos-Guyot Bluff and Mount Irving; Treskavets Glacier, Orcho Glacier and Banari Glacier surmounted by Ravelin Ridge; and Cape Lloyd.

Duclos-Guyot Bluff (Bulgarian: връх Дюкло Гийо, ‘Vrah Duclos-Guyot’ \'vrah dyu-'klo gi-'yo\) is the ice-covered peak rising to 1800 m at the south extremity of Urda Ridge on Clarence Island in the South Shetland Islands, Antarctica. It has precipitous and partly ice-free south slopes, and surmounts Skaplizo Glacier to the west and Dobrodan Glacier to the northeast.

The peak is named after the French mariner Nicolas Pierre Duclos-Guyot (1722-1794), second in command under Louis Antoine de Bougainville in the first French circumnavigation of the world, who sailed in Antarctic waters on board the Spanish ship León in 1756.

== Location ==
Duclos-Guyot Bluff is located at 61°17′58″S 54°07′28″W, which is 2.9 km northwest of Cape Bowles, 5.6 km east of Craggy Point and 2.4 km south of Mount Irving. British mapping in 1972 and 2009.

== Maps ==
- British Antarctic Territory. Scale 1:200000 topographic map. DOS 610 Series, Sheet W 61 54. Directorate of Overseas Surveys, Tolworth, UK, 1972.
- South Shetland Islands: Elephant, Clarence and Gibbs Islands. Scale 1:220000 topographic map. UK Antarctic Place-names Committee, 2009.
- Antarctic Digital Database (ADD). Scale 1:250000 topographic map of Antarctica. Scientific Committee on Antarctic Research (SCAR). Since 1993, regularly upgraded and updated.
