= Ilyo Point =

Location of Clarence Island in the South Shetland Islands.

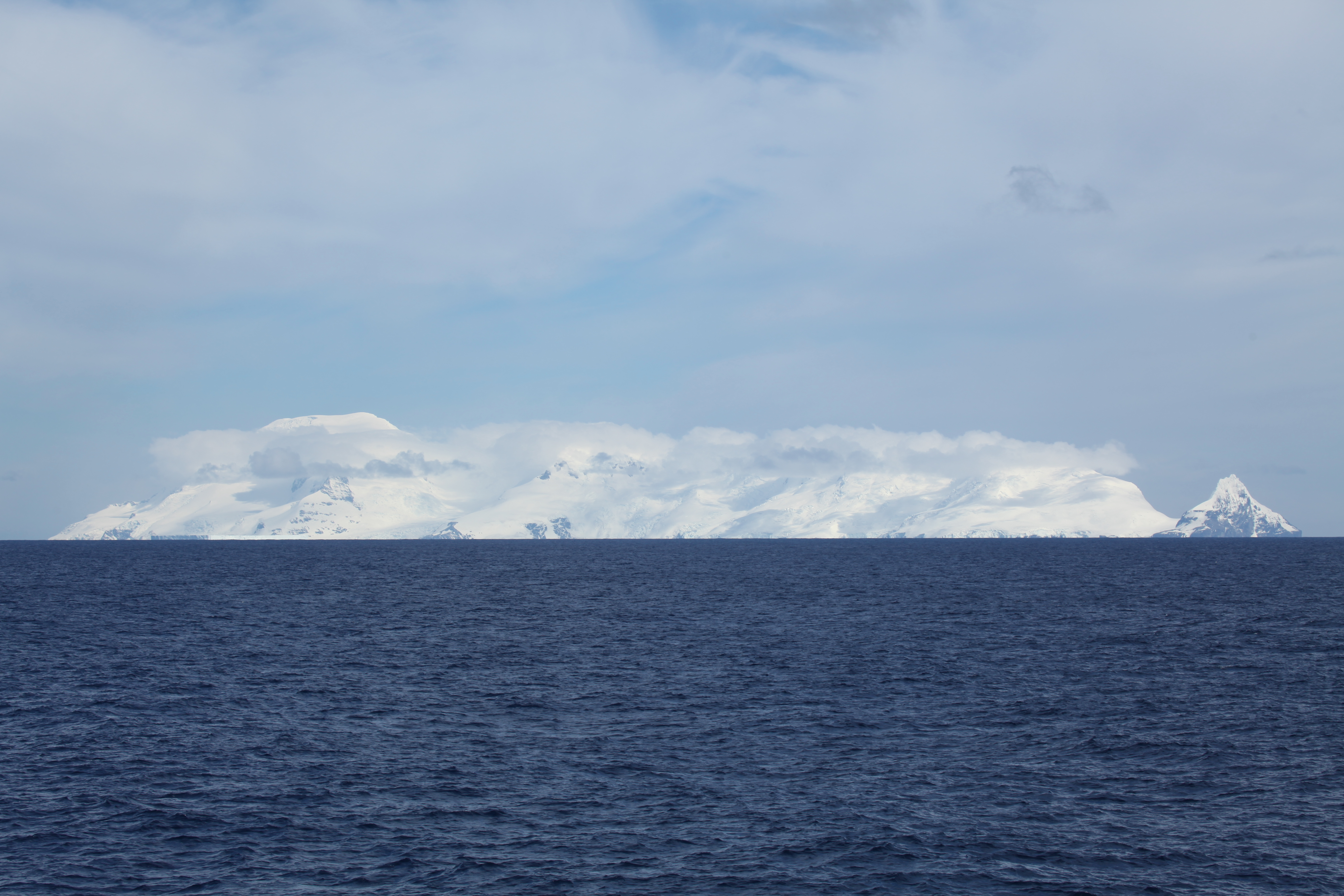
Clarence Island seen from northeast with (left to right) Cape Bowles, Istros Bay, Sugarloaf Island, Smith Cove, Kakrina Point, Kutela Cove and Cape Lloyd.

Ilyo Point (Bulgarian: нос Ильо, ‘Nos Ilyo’ \'nos 'i-lyo\) is a narrow rocky point projecting 600 m east-northeastwards from the east coast of Clarence Island in the South Shetland Islands, Antarctica. It forms the south side of the entrance to Smith Cove.

The point is named after the Bulgarian rebel leader Ilyo Voyvoda (Iliya Popgeorgiev, 1805-1898).

== Location ==
Ilyo Point is located at 61°10′35.7″S 54°01′38″W, which is 4.77 km north of Sugarloaf Island, 1.17 km south of Kakrina Point and 5.45 km south of Cape Lloyd. British mapping in 1972 and 2009.

== Maps ==
- British Antarctic Territory. Scale 1:200000 topographic map. DOS 610 Series, Sheet W 61 54. Directorate of Overseas Surveys, Tolworth, UK, 1972.
- South Shetland Islands: Elephant, Clarence and Gibbs Islands. Scale 1:220000 topographic map. UK Antarctic Place-names Committee, 2009.
- Antarctic Digital Database (ADD). Scale 1:250000 topographic map of Antarctica. Scientific Committee on Antarctic Research (SCAR). Since 1993, regularly upgraded and updated.
