= Kakrina Point =

Point in the South Shetland Islands, Antarctica

Location of Clarence Island in the South Shetland Islands.

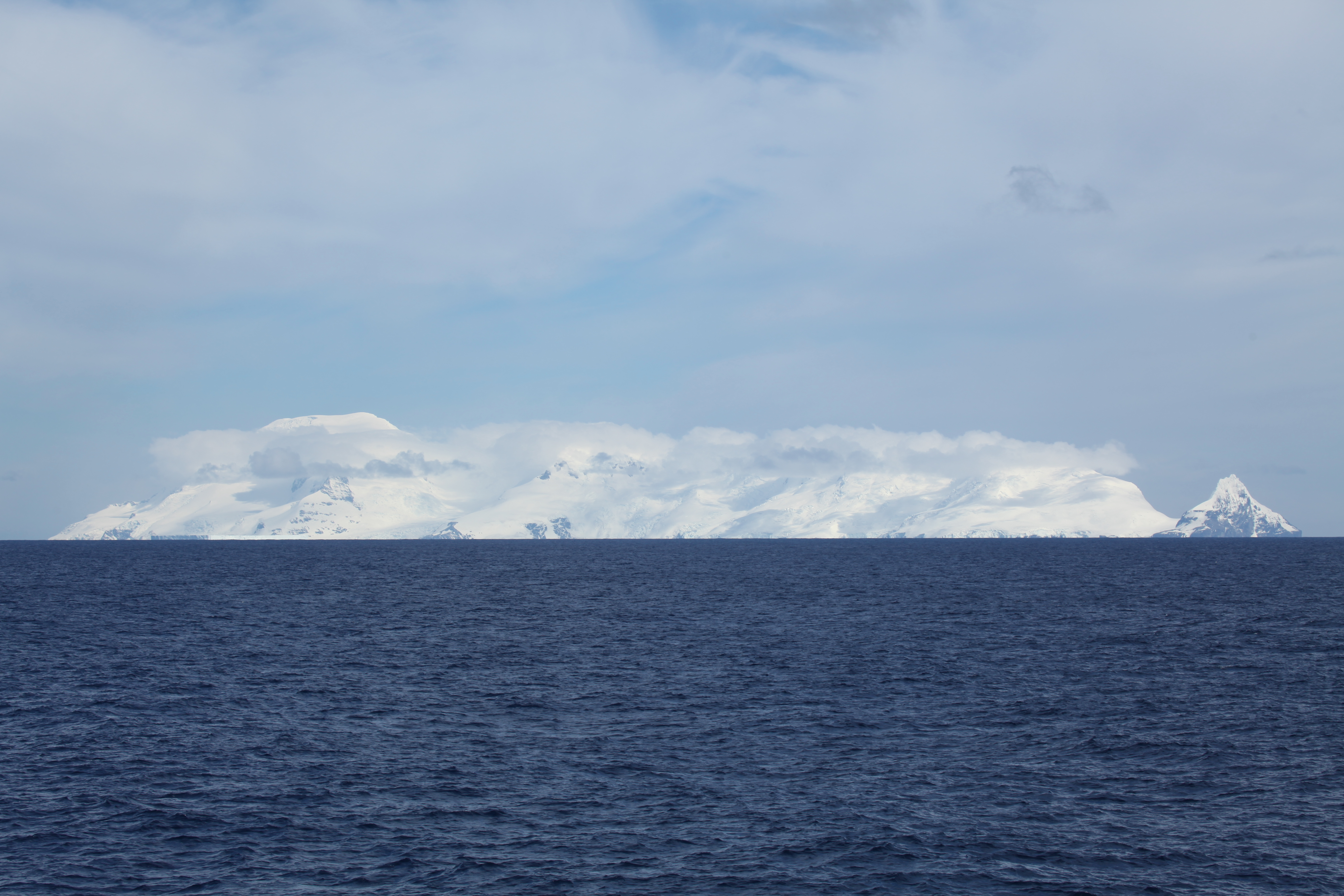
Clarence Island seen from northeast with (left to right) Cape Bowles, Istros Bay, Sugarloaf Island, Smith Cove, Kakrina Point, Kutela Cove and Cape Lloyd.

Kakrina Point (Bulgarian: нос Къкрина, ‘Nos Kakrina’ \'nos 'k&-kri-na\) is the rock-tipped point projecting 400 m south-southeastwards from the east coast of Clarence Island in the South Shetland Islands, Antarctica. It forms the north side of the entrance to Smith Cove.

The point is named after the settlement of Kakrina in Northern Bulgaria.

== Location ==
Kakrina Point is located at 61°09′58.6″S 54°01′21″W, which is 5.91 km north of Sugarloaf Island, 1.17 km north of Ilyo Point and 4.28 km south of Cape Lloyd. British mapping in 1972 and 2009.

== Maps ==
- British Antarctic Territory. Scale 1:200000 topographic map. DOS 610 Series, Sheet W 61 54. Directorate of Overseas Surveys, Tolworth, UK, 1972.
- South Shetland Islands: Elephant, Clarence and Gibbs Islands. Scale 1:220000 topographic map. UK Antarctic Place-names Committee, 2009.
- Antarctic Digital Database (ADD). Scale 1:250000 topographic map of Antarctica. Scientific Committee on Antarctic Research (SCAR). Since 1993, regularly upgraded and updated.
