= Smith Cove (South Shetland Islands) =

Location of Clarence Island in the South Shetland Islands.

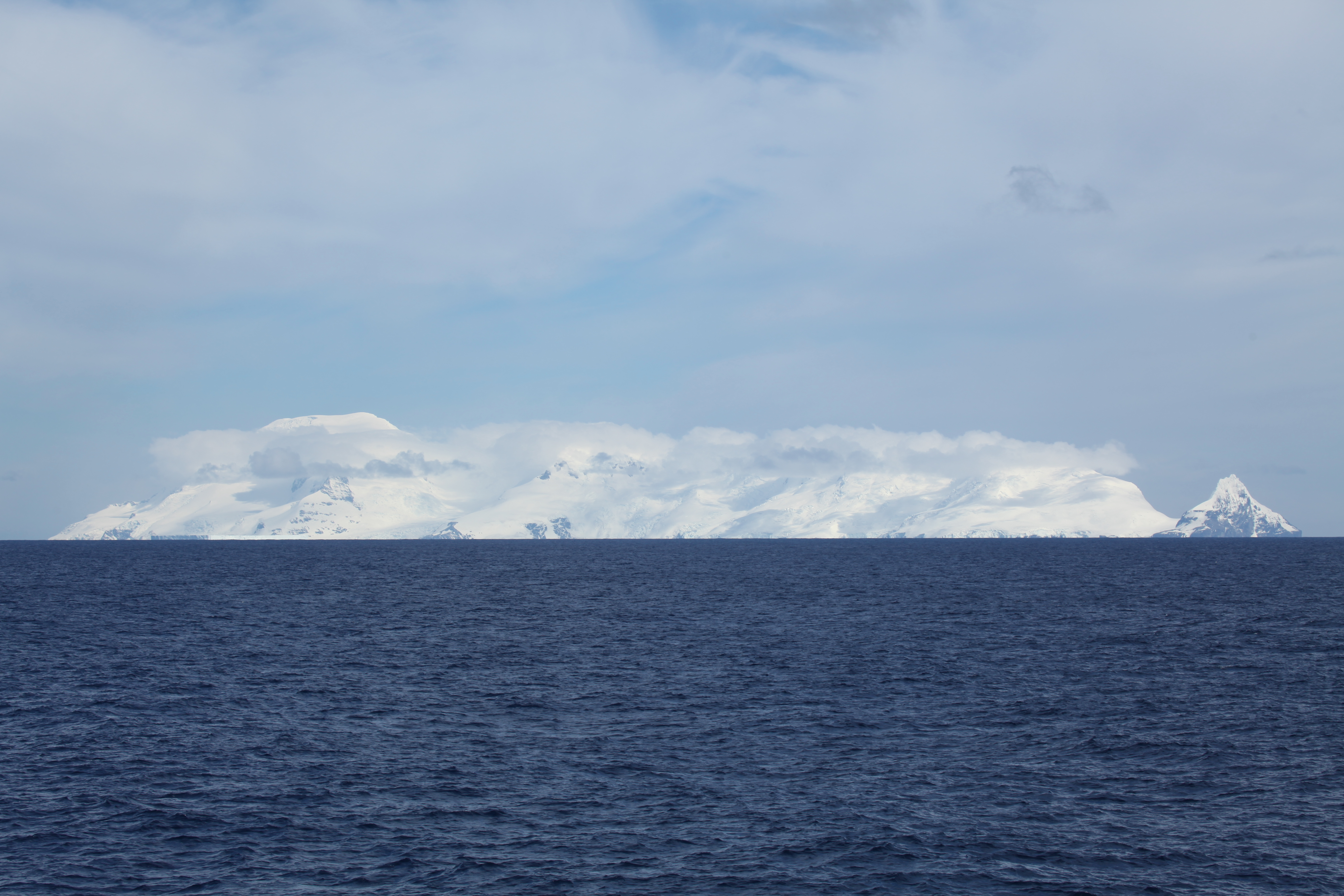
Clarence Island seen from northeast with (left to right) Cape Bowles, Istros Bay, Sugarloaf Island, Smith Cove, Kakrina Point, Kutela Cove and Cape Lloyd.

Smith Cove (Bulgarian: залив Смит, romanized: zaliv Smit, IPA: [ˈzalif ˈsmit]) is the 1.17 km wide cove indenting for 1.33 km the east coast of Clarence Island in the South Shetland Islands, Antarctica. It is entered north of Ilyo Point and south of Kakrina Point, and has its head fed by Banari Glacier.

The cove is named after the British sealer Thomas Smith who narrated his four seasons in the Antarctic in a book published in 1844.

== Location ==
Smith Cove is centred at 61°10′15″S 54°02′00″W. British mapping in 1972 and 2009.

== Maps ==
- British Antarctic Territory. Scale 1:200000 topographic map. DOS 610 Series, Sheet W 61 54. Directorate of Overseas Surveys, Tolworth, UK, 1972.
- South Shetland Islands: Elephant, Clarence and Gibbs Islands. Scale 1:220000 topographic map. UK Antarctic Place-names Committee, 2009.
- Antarctic Digital Database (ADD). Scale 1:250000 topographic map of Antarctica. Scientific Committee on Antarctic Research (SCAR). Since 1993, regularly upgraded and updated.
