= Kutela Cove =

Location of Clarence Island in the South Shetland Islands.

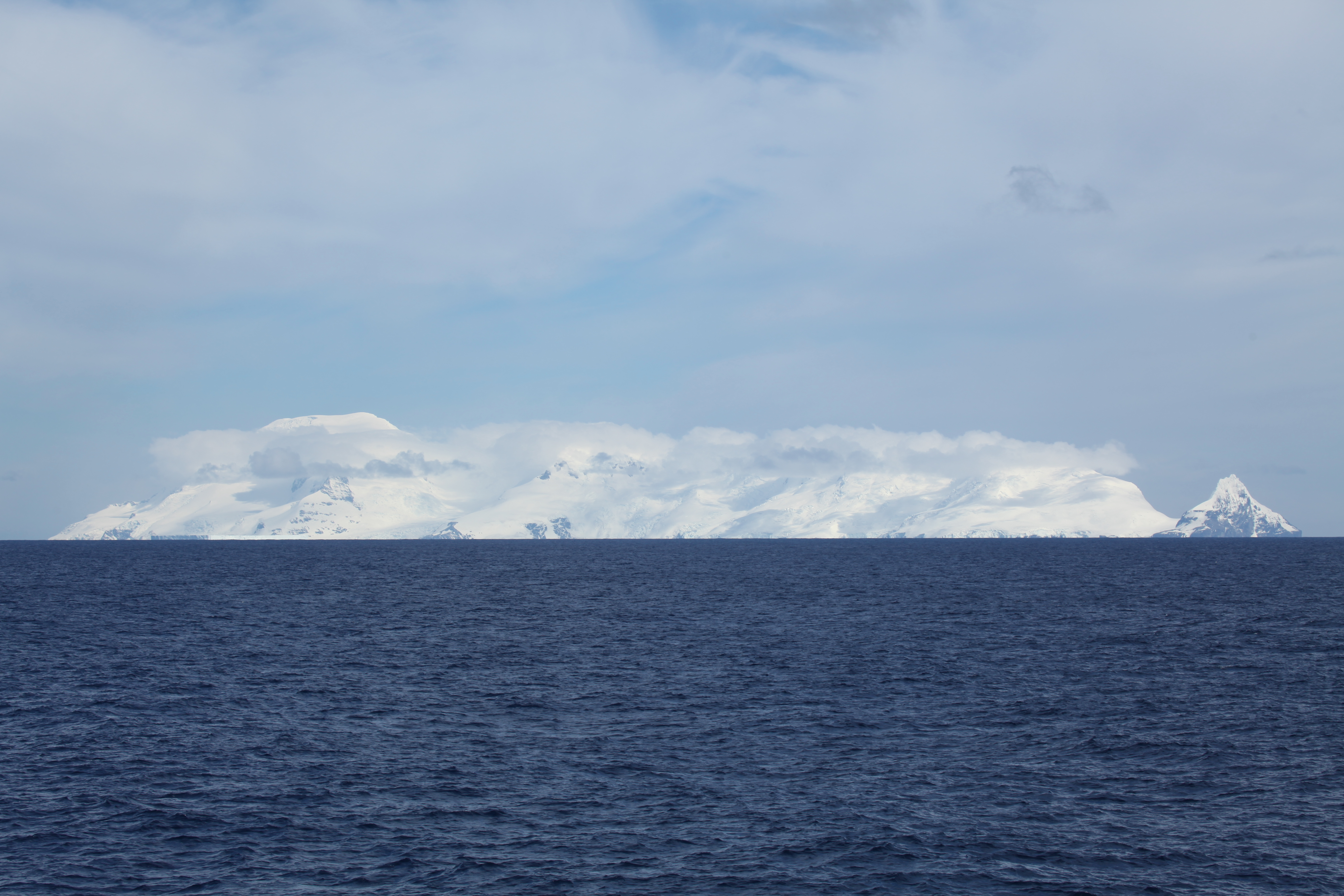
Clarence Island seen from northeast with (left to right) Cape Bowles, Istros Bay, Sugarloaf Island, Smith Cove, Kakrina Point, Kutela Cove and Cape Lloyd surmounted by Jubilee Peak.

Kutela Cove (Bulgarian: залив Кутела, ‘Zaliv Kutela’ \'za-liv ku-'te-la\) is the 330 m wide cove indenting for 750 m the east coast of Clarence Island in the South Shetland Islands, Antarctica. It is entered just south of Cape Lloyd.

The cove is named after the settlement of Kutela in Southern Bulgaria.

== Location ==
Kutela Cove is centred at 61°08′06.5″S 54°00′50″W. British mapping in 1972 and 2009.

== Maps ==
- British Antarctic Territory. Scale 1:200000 topographic map. DOS 610 Series, Sheet W 61 54. Directorate of Overseas Surveys, Tolworth, UK, 1972.
- South Shetland Islands: Elephant, Clarence and Gibbs Islands. Scale 1:220000 topographic map. UK Antarctic Place-names Committee, 2009.
- Antarctic Digital Database (ADD). Scale 1:250000 topographic map of Antarctica. Scientific Committee on Antarctic Research (SCAR). Since 1993, regularly upgraded and updated.
