= Giridava Glacier =

Antarctic glacier

- Location of Clarence Island in the South Shetland Islands

- Location within South Shetland Islands Location within Antarctica
- Location: Clarence Island; South Shetland Islands
- Coordinates: 61°15′25″S 54°10′20″W
- Length: 1.5 nautical miles (2.8 km; 1.7 mi)
- Width: 0.6 nautical miles (1.1 km; 0.69 mi)
- Thickness: unknown
- Terminus: Chinstrap Cove
- Status: unknown

Giridava Glacier (Bulgarian: ледник Гиридава, romanized: lednik Giridava, IPA: [ˈlɛdniɡ ɡiriˈdavɐ]) is 1.5 nautical miles (2.8 km; 1.7 mi) long and 0.6 nautical miles (1.1 km; 0.69 mi) wide glacier on the west side of Urda Ridge on Clarence Island in the South Shetland Islands, Antarctica situated north of Skaplizo Glacier and southwest of Bersame Glacier. It drains the slopes of Mount Irving, flows northwestwards and enters Chinstrap Cove east of Vaglen Point.

The glacier is named after the Thracian settlement of Giridava in Northern Bulgaria.

== Location ==
Giridava Glacier is centred at 61°15′25″S 54°10′20″W. British mapping in 1972 and 2009.

== See also ==
- List of glaciers in the Antarctic
- Glaciology

== Maps ==
- British Antarctic Territory. Scale 1:200000 topographic map. DOS 610 Series, Sheet W 61 54. Directorate of Overseas Surveys, Tolworth, UK, 1972.
- South Shetland Islands: Elephant, Clarence and Gibbs Islands. Scale 1:220000 topographic map. UK Antarctic Place-names Committee, 2009.
- Antarctic Digital Database (ADD). Scale 1:250000 topographic map of Antarctica. Scientific Committee on Antarctic Research (SCAR). Since 1993, regularly upgraded and updated.
