= Fur Seal Point =

Point in Antarctica

Coordinates: 61°12′S 54°00′W

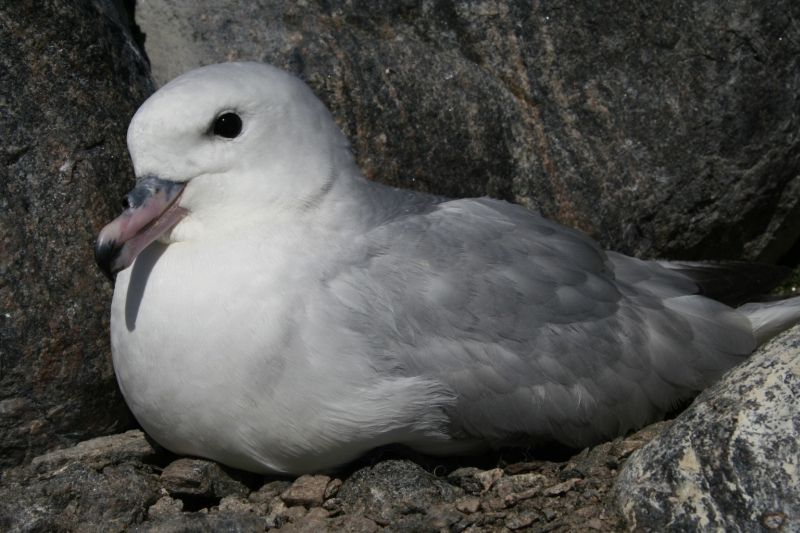
The IBA is an important breeding site for southern fulmars

Fur Seal Point, sometimes referred to as Fur Seal Beach, is a cape midway along the eastern coast of Clarence Island, the easternmost of the South Shetland Islands of Antarctica. Just off the headland lies the small Sugarloaf Island.

== Important Bird Area ==
A 205 ha site at the headland has been identified as an Important Bird Area (IBA) by BirdLife International because it supports a large breeding colony of about 57,000 pairs of chinstrap penguins. It is also one of only two known nesting sites for southern fulmars on Clarence Island, the other being Escarpada Point.
