= Dobrodan Glacier =

Glacier in Antarctica

- Location of Clarence Island in the South Shetland Islands

- Location within South Shetland Islands Location within Antarctica
- Location: Clarence Island; South Shetland Islands
- Coordinates: 61°16′15″S 54°04′20″W
- Length: 1.8 nmi (3 km; 2 mi)
- Width: 0.6 nmi (1 km; 1 mi)
- Thickness: unknown
- Terminus: Lebed Point
- Status: unknown

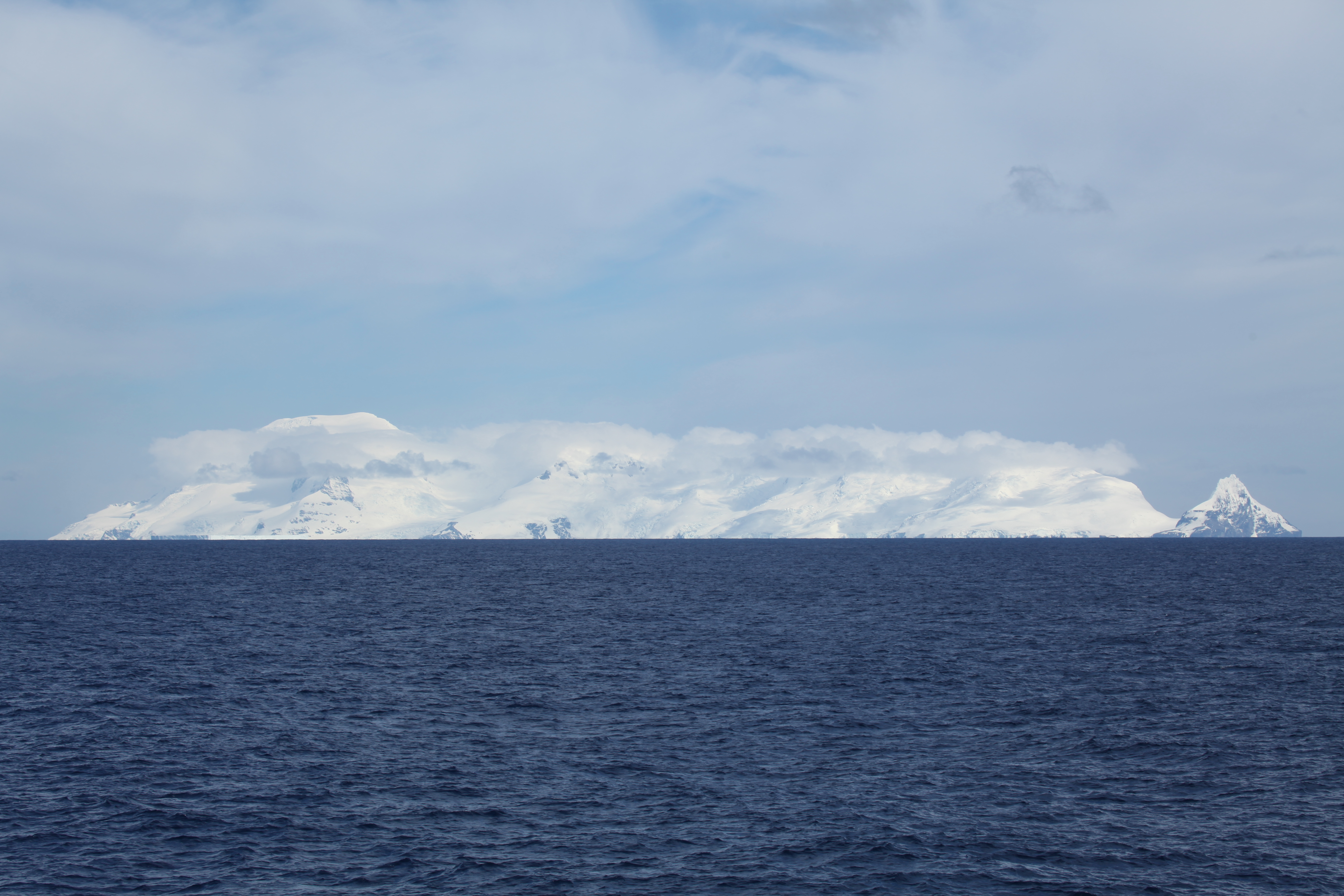
Clarence Island seen from northeast with (left to right) Cape Bowles; Dobrodan Glacier and Highton Glacier surmounted by Urda Ridge; Treskavets Glacier, Orcho Glacier and Banari Glacier surmounted by Ravelin Ridge; and Cape Lloyd

Dobrodan Glacier (Bulgarian: ледник Добродан, romanized: lednik Dobrodan, IPA: [ˈlɛdniɡ dobroˈdan]) is the 3.4 km long and 1.2 km wide glacier on the east side of Urda Ridge on Clarence Island in the South Shetland Islands, Antarctica situated south of Highton Glacier. It drains the slopes of Mount Irving and Duclos-Guyot Bluff, flows northeastwards and enters the Southern Ocean south of Lebed Point.

The glacier is named after the settlement of Dobrodan in Northern Bulgaria.

== Location ==
Dobrodan Glacier is centred at 61°16′15″S 54°04′20″W. British mapping in 1972 and 2009.

== See also ==
- List of glaciers in the Antarctic
- Glaciology

== Maps ==
- British Antarctic Territory. Scale 1:200000 topographic map. DOS 610 Series, Sheet W 61 54. Directorate of Overseas Surveys, Tolworth, UK, 1972.
- South Shetland Islands: Elephant, Clarence and Gibbs Islands. Scale 1:220000 topographic map. UK Antarctic Place-names Committee, 2009.
- Antarctic Digital Database (ADD). Scale 1:250000 topographic map of Antarctica. Scientific Committee on Antarctic Research (SCAR), 1993–2016.
