= Skaplizo Glacier =

Glacier in Antarctica

- Location of Clarence Island in the South Shetland Islands

- Location within South Shetland Islands Location within Antarctica
- Location: Clarence Island; South Shetland Islands
- Coordinates: 61°16′50″S 54°11′00″W
- Length: 2 nautical miles (3.7 km; 2.3 mi)
- Width: 0.8 nautical miles (1.5 km; 0.92 mi)
- Thickness: unknown
- Terminus: northeast of Chichil Point
- Status: unknown

Skaplizo Glacier (Bulgarian: ледник Скаплизо, romanized: lednik Skaplizo, IPA: [ˈlɛdnik skɐˈplizo]) is 2 nautical miles (3.7 km; 2.3 mi) long and 0.8 nautical miles (1.5 km; 0.92 mi) wide glacier on the west side of Urda Ridge on Clarence Island in the South Shetland Islands, Antarctica situated south of Giridava Glacier. It drains the slopes of Mount Irving and Duclos-Guyot Bluff, flows west-northwestwards and enters the Southern Ocean northeast of Chichil Point.

The glacier is named after the Thracian settlement of Skaplizo in Southwestern Bulgaria.

== Location ==
Skaplizo Glacier is centred at 61°16′50″S 54°11′00″W. British mapping in 1972 and 2009.

== See also ==
- List of glaciers in the Antarctic
- Glaciology

== Maps ==
- British Antarctic Territory. Scale 1:200000 topographic map. DOS 610 Series, Sheet W 61 54. Directorate of Overseas Surveys, Tolworth, UK, 1972.
- South Shetland Islands: Elephant, Clarence and Gibbs Islands. Scale 1:220000 topographic map. UK Antarctic Place-names Committee, 2009.
- Antarctic Digital Database (ADD). Scale 1:250000 topographic map of Antarctica. Scientific Committee on Antarctic Research (SCAR). Since 1993, regularly upgraded and updated.
