= Lebed Point =

Location of Lebed Point in Antarctica

Location of Clarence Island in the South Shetland Islands.

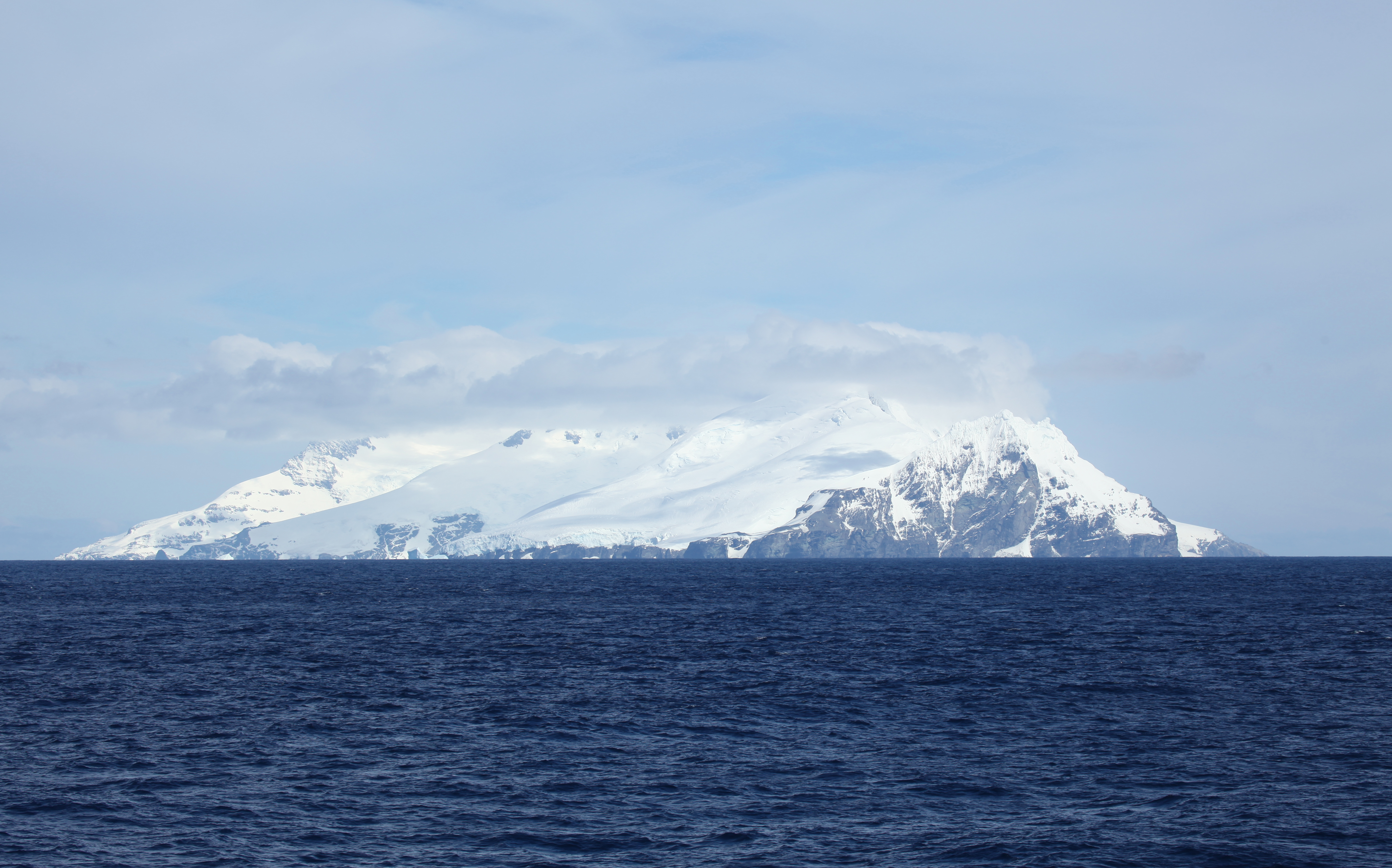
Clarence Island seen from north-northeast with (left to right) Lebed Point, Sugarloaf Island and Cape Lloyd.

Lebed Point (Bulgarian: нос Лебед, ‘Nos Lebed’ \'nos 'le-bed\) is the rocky point on the south side of the entrance to Istros Bay on the east coast of Clarence Island in the South Shetland Islands, Antarctica.

The point is “named after the settlement of Lebed in Southern Bulgaria, and in connection with the fishing trawler Lebed of the Bulgarian company Ocean Fisheries – Burgas that operated in Antarctic waters off South Georgia in the 1970/71 season. The Bulgarian fishermen, along with those of the Soviet Union, Poland and East Germany are the pioneers of modern Antarctic fishing industry.”

== Location ==
Lebed Point is located at 61°14′57.5″S 54°01′55″W, which is 8.1 km north-northeast of Cape Bowles and 3.2 km south of Sugarloaf Island. British mapping in 1972 and 2009.

== Maps ==
- British Antarctic Territory. Scale 1:200000 topographic map. DOS 610 Series, Sheet W 61 54. Directorate of Overseas Surveys, Tolworth, UK, 1972.
- South Shetland Islands: Elephant, Clarence and Gibbs Islands. Scale 1:220000 topographic map. UK Antarctic Place-names Committee, 2009.
- Antarctic Digital Database (ADD). Scale 1:250000 topographic map of Antarctica. Scientific Committee on Antarctic Research (SCAR). Since 1993, regularly upgraded and updated.
