= Chichil Point =

Rocky point in the South Shetland Islands, Antarctica

Location of Chichil Point in Antarctica

Location of Clarence Island in the South Shetland Islands

Chichil Point (Bulgarian: нос Чичил, ‘Nos Chichil’ \'nos 'chi-chil\) is the rocky point on the southwest coast of Clarence Island in the South Shetland Islands, Antarctica, forming the west extremity of the island.

The point is named after the settlement of Chichil in Northwestern Bulgaria.

== Location ==
Chichil Point is located at 61°16′33″S 54°14′07″W, which is 2.1 km north of Craggy Point and 4.05 km southwest of Vaglen Point. British mapping in 1972 and 2009.

== Maps ==
- British Antarctic Territory. Scale 1:200000 topographic map. DOS 610 Series, Sheet W 61 54. Directorate of Overseas Surveys, Tolworth, UK, 1972.
- South Shetland Islands: Elephant, Clarence and Gibbs Islands. Scale 1:220000 topographic map. UK Antarctic Place-names Committee, 2009.
- Antarctic Digital Database (ADD). Scale 1:250000 topographic map of Antarctica. Scientific Committee on Antarctic Research (SCAR). Since 1993, regularly upgraded and updated.
