= Kakrina =

Coordinates: 43°8′N 24°53′E

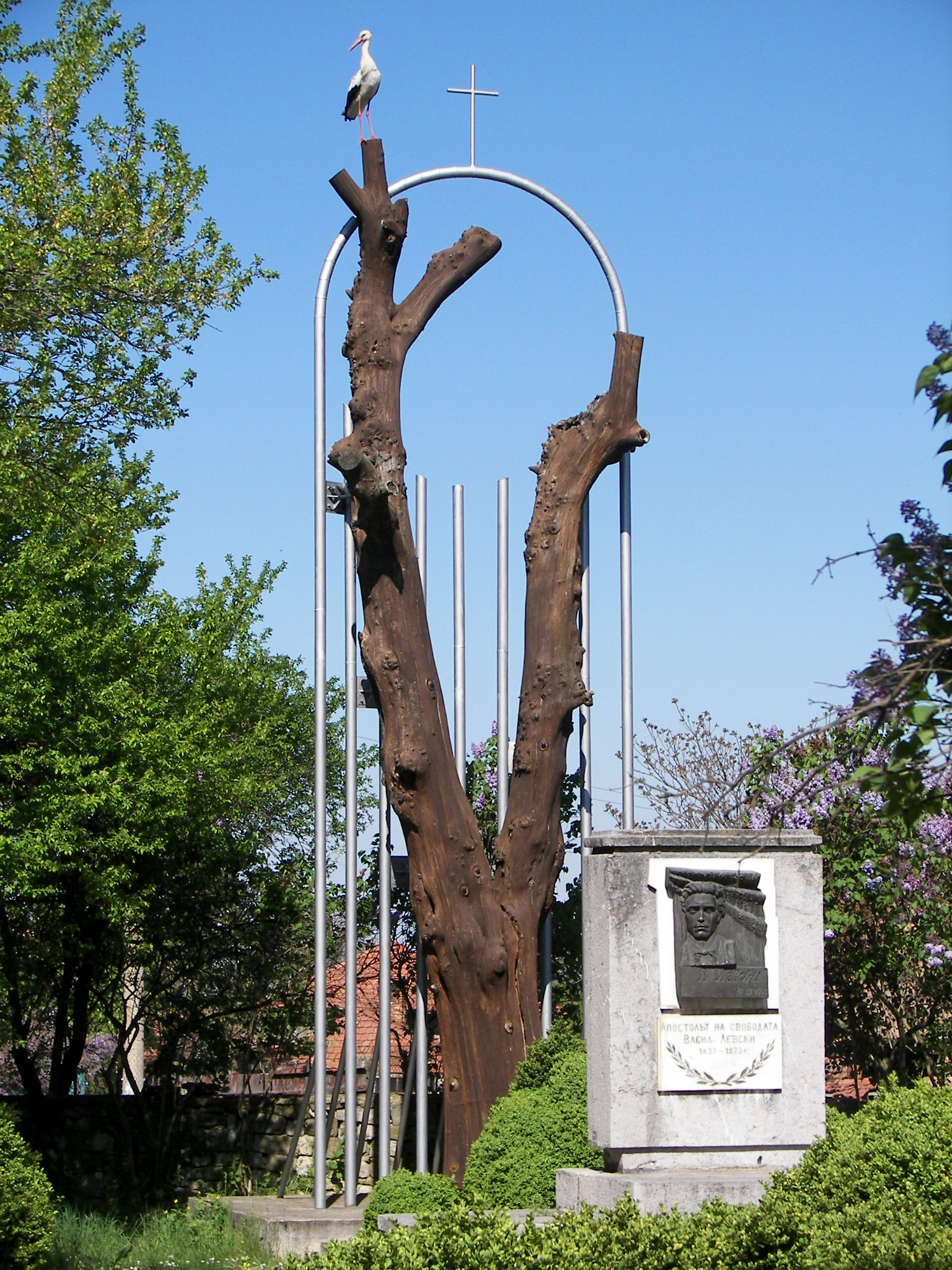
- Apostle of Freedom memorial in Kakrina
- Interactive map of Kakrina

Kakrina (Bulgarian: Къкрина) is a village in central northern Bulgaria, part of Lovech Municipality, Lovech Province. It lies in the central Fore-Balkan Mountains, at an altitude of 465 metres (1,526 ft). As of 2008, it has a population of 298.

Kakrina is mainly famous as the site of the Kakrina Inn (Къкринско ханче, Kakrinsko hanche) where national hero Vasil Levski was captured by the Ottoman government in 1872. The inn is today a museum and one of the official 100 Tourist Sites of Bulgaria.

== Gallery ==
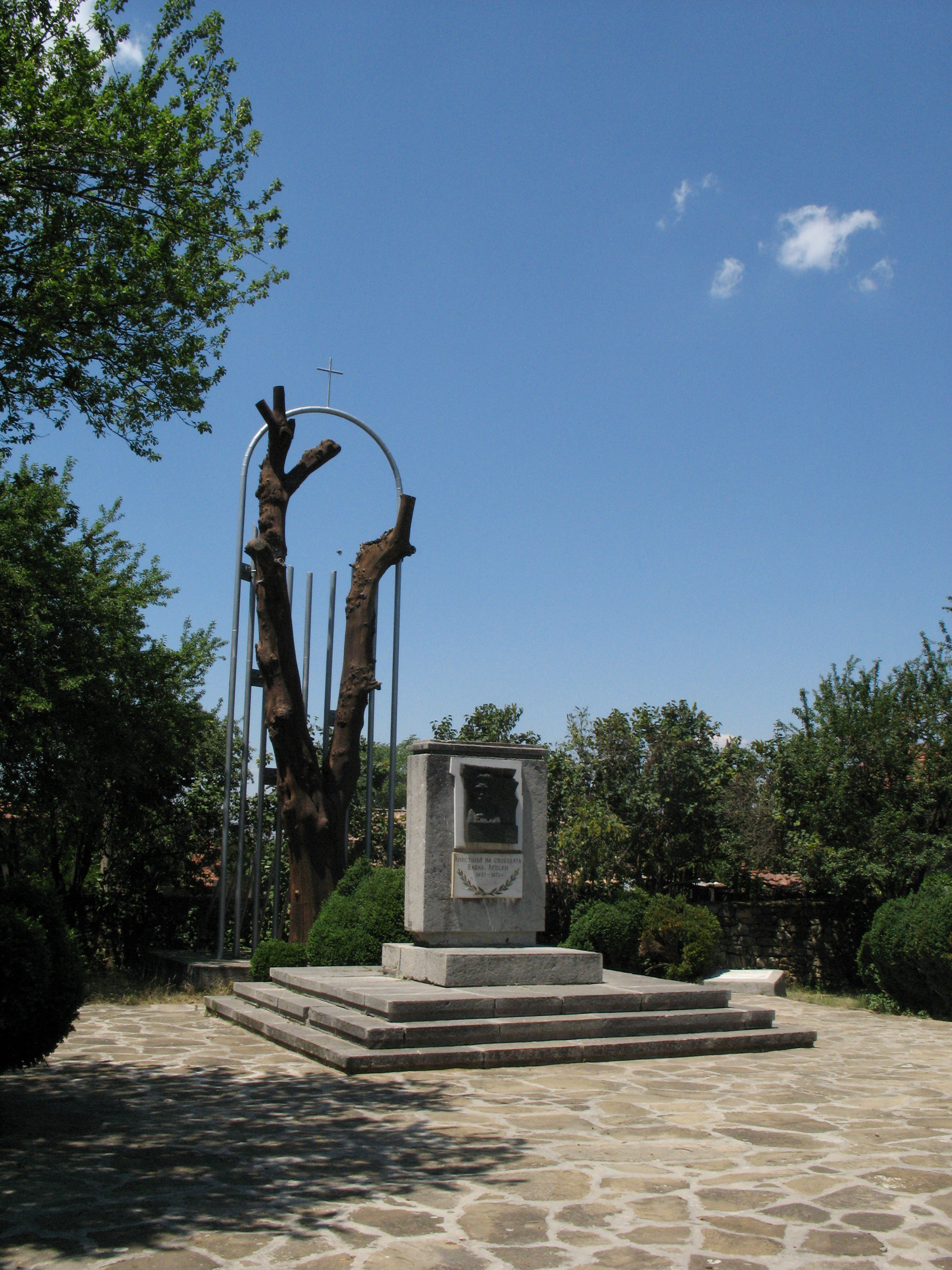
Monument to Levski

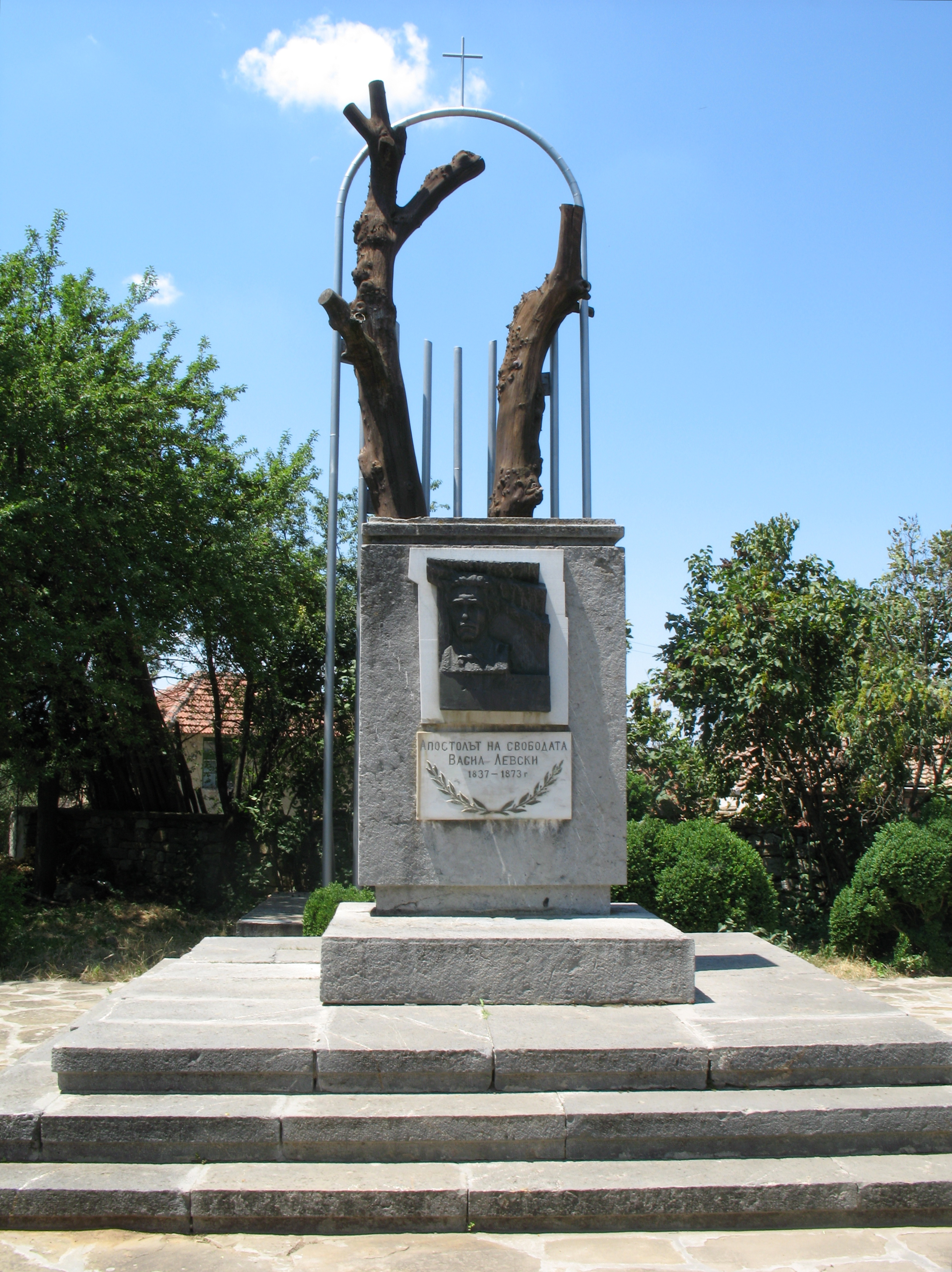
Monument to Levski

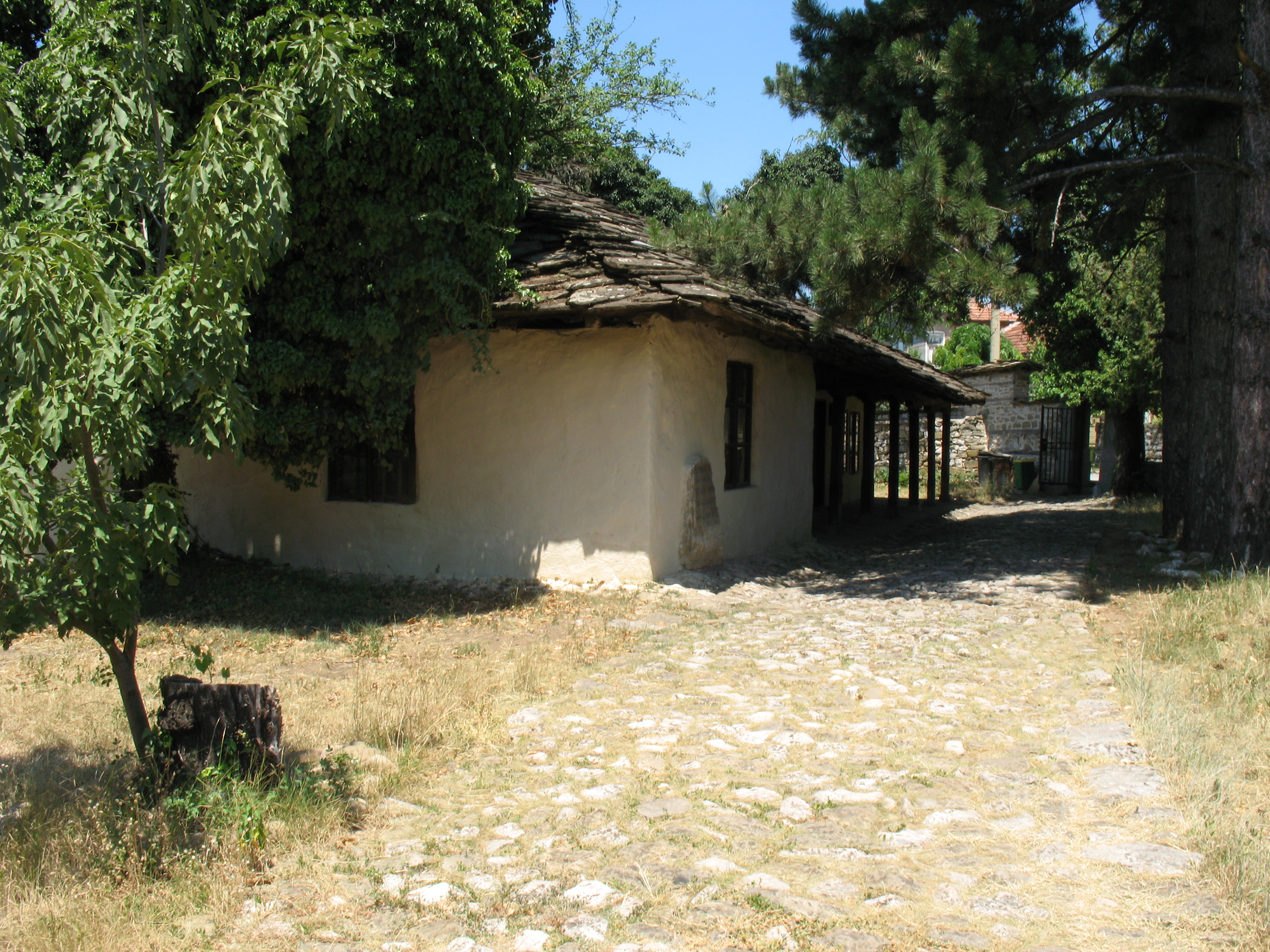
Kakrina Inn Museum

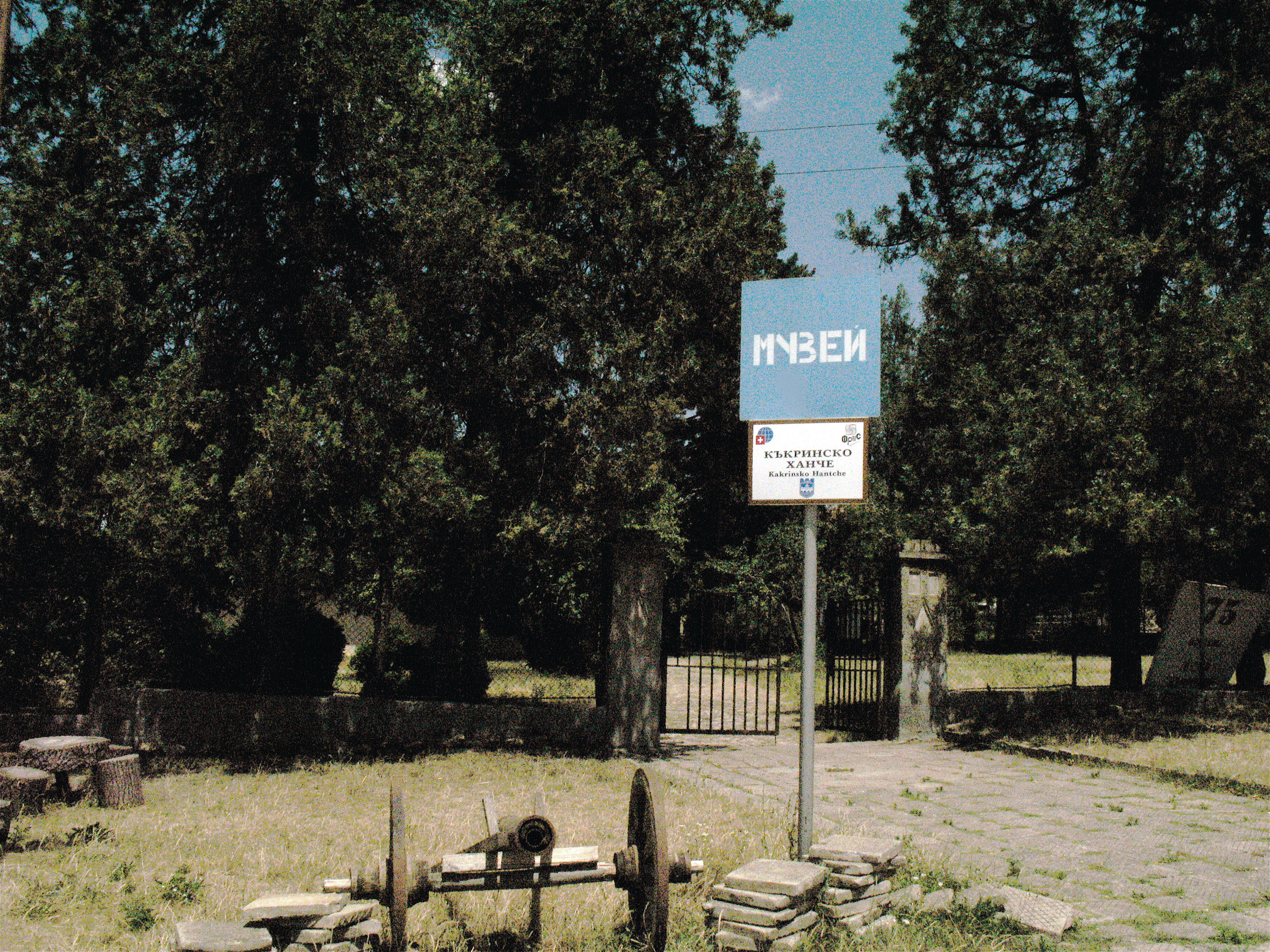
Kakrina Inn Museum

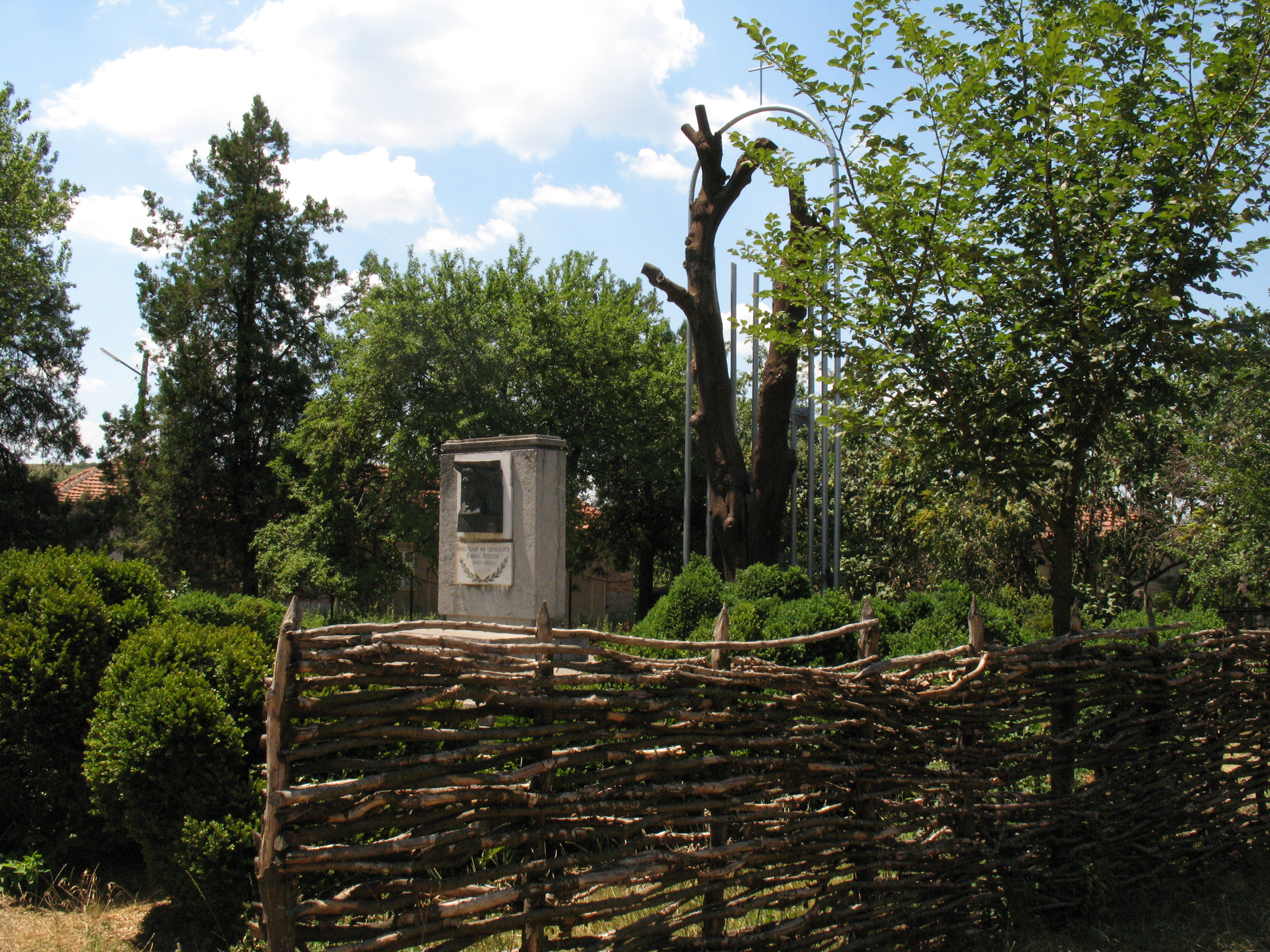
Kakrina Inn Museum

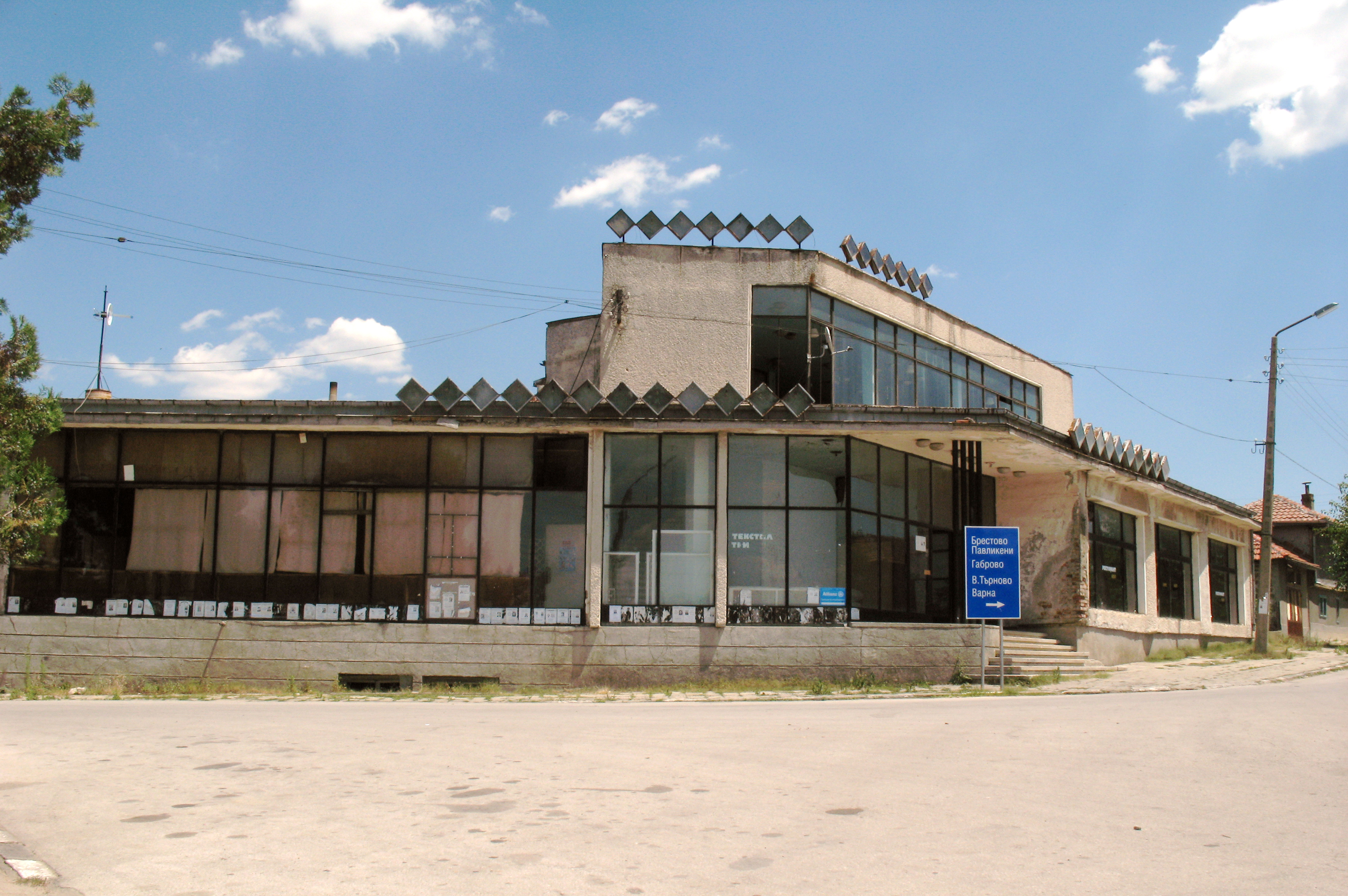
Village centre

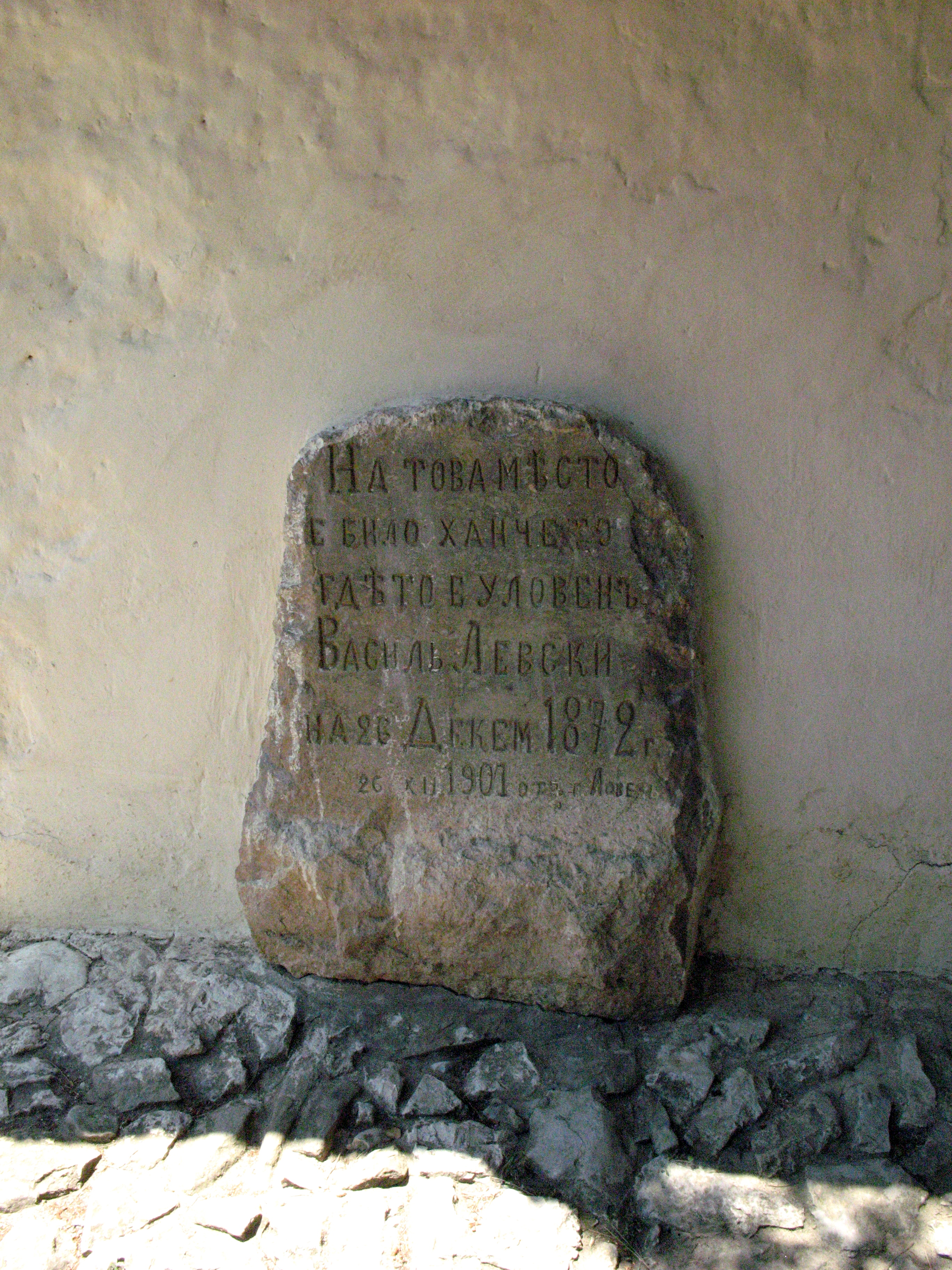
Plate commemorating 26 December 1872

== Honours ==
Kakrina Point on Clarence Island, Antarctica is named after the village.
