= John E. Highton =

John Ernest Highton (1935 – 2008) was a Royal Navy Commander, Antarctic explorer, and rugby union player.

He was Deputy Leader of the 1976-77 Joint Services Expedition to the Elephant Island Group and was in charge of the group on Clarence Island (South Shetland Islands). The UK Antarctic Place-Names Committee named Highton Glacier on Clarence Island after him in 1980.

Highton played rugby for Devonport Services R.F.C. and Barbarian F.C., and was part of the England national rugby union team in forward position during the 1963 England rugby union tour of Australasia. He was captain of the HMS Victorious rugby team whilst serving on the vessel from 1963 to 1964.
