= Urda Ridge =

Promontory on Clarence Island, Antarctica

Location of Clarence Island in the South Shetland Islands.

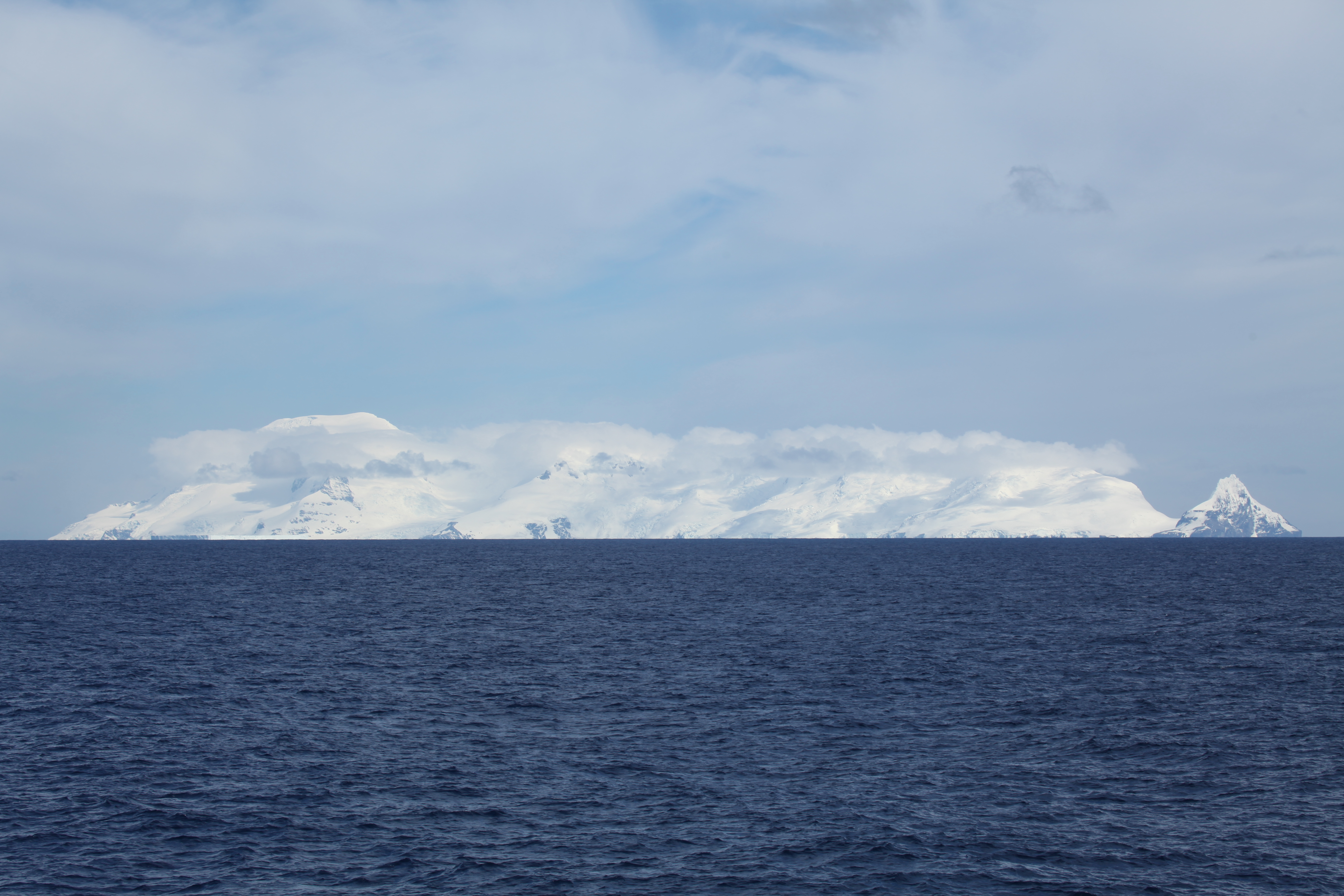
Clarence Island seen from northeast with (left to right) Cape Bowles; Dobrodan Glacier and Highton Glacier surmounted by Urda Ridge; Treskavets Glacier, Orcho Glacier and Banari Glacier surmounted by Ravelin Ridge; and Cape Lloyd.

Urda Ridge (Bulgarian: Урдин хребет, ‘Urdin Hrebet’ \'ur-din 'hre-bet\) is the mostly ice-covered ridge occupying the interior of southern Clarence Island in the South Shetland Islands, Antarctica. It extends 8 km in north-northeast to south-southwest direction and 9 km in west-northwest to east-southeast direction, rising to 1950 m at the island's summit Mount Irving, and is connected to Ravelin Ridge to the north by Soyka Saddle. The southeast slopes of the feature are drained by Dobrodan and Highton Glaciers, and its northwest slopes — by Skaplizo, Giridava and Bersame Glaciers. Urda is a Thracian place name from Southern Bulgaria.

== Location ==
Urda Ridge is centred at 61°16′10″S 54°08′00″W. British mapping in 1972 and 2009.

== Maps ==
- British Antarctic Territory. Scale 1:200000 topographic map. DOS 610 Series, Sheet W 61 54. Directorate of Overseas Surveys, Tolworth, UK, 1972.
- South Shetland Islands: Elephant, Clarence and Gibbs Islands. Scale 1:220000 topographic map. UK Antarctic Place-names Committee, 2009.
- Antarctic Digital Database (ADD). Scale 1:250000 topographic map of Antarctica. Scientific Committee on Antarctic Research (SCAR). Since 1993, regularly upgraded and updated.
