= Treskavets Glacier =

Glacier in the South Shetland Islands

- Location of Clarence Island in the South Shetland Islands

- Location within South Shetland Islands Location within Antarctica
- Location: Clarence Island; South Shetland Islands
- Coordinates: 61°13′00″S 54°05′00″W
- Length: 1.3 nautical miles (2.4 km; 1.5 mi)
- Width: 0.8 nautical miles (1.5 km; 0.92 mi)
- Thickness: unknown
- Terminus: south of Gesha Point
- Status: unknown

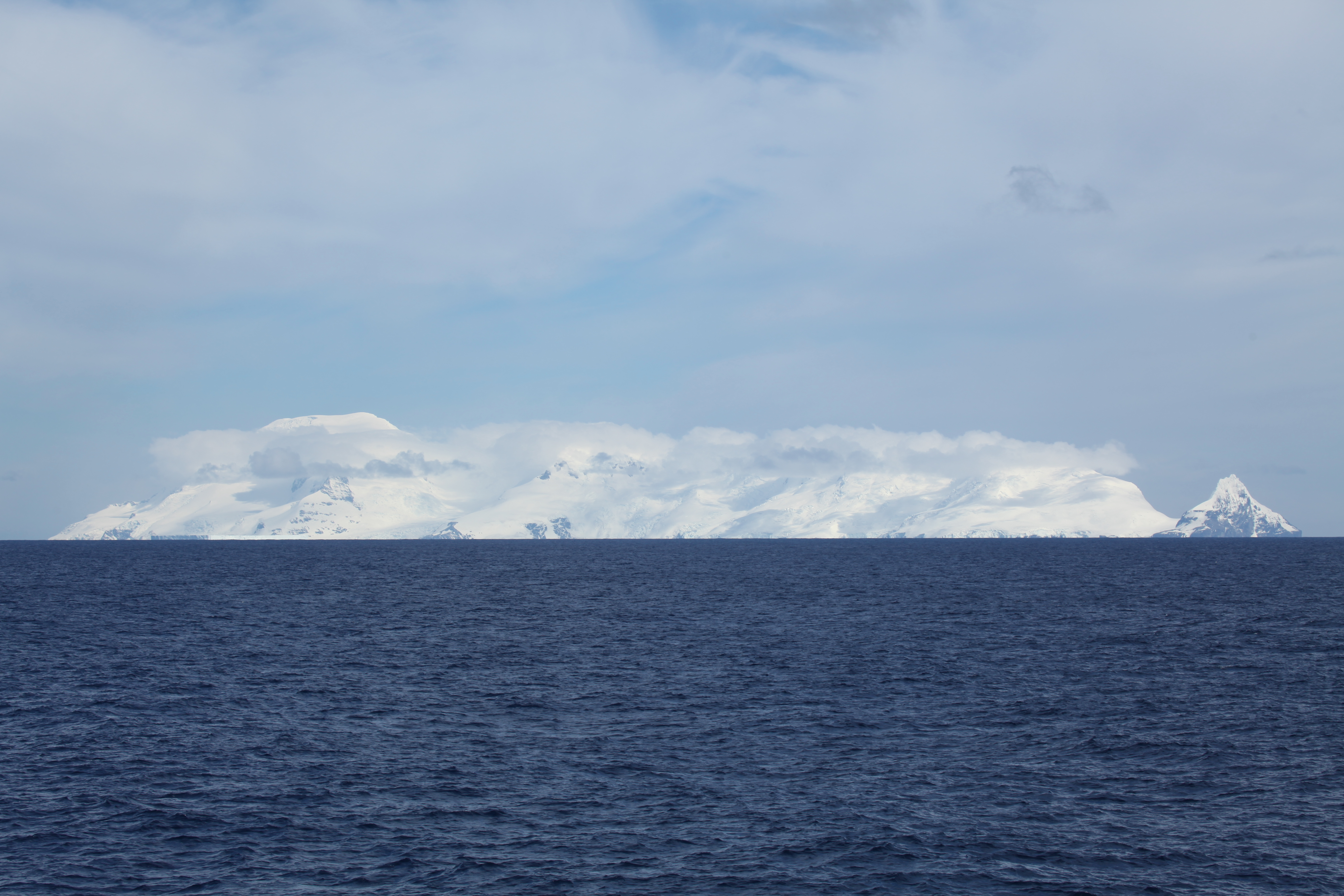
Clarence Island seen from northeast with (left to right) Cape Bowles; Dobrodan Glacier and Highton Glacier surmounted by Urda Ridge; Treskavets Glacier, Orcho Glacier and Banari Glacier surmounted by Ravelin Ridge; and Cape Lloyd.

Treskavets Glacier (Bulgarian: ледник Трескавец, romanized: lednik Treskavets, IPA: [ˈlɛdnik trɛˈskavɛt͡s]) is 1.3 nautical miles (2.4 km; 1.5 mi) long and 0.8 nautical miles (1.5 km; 0.92 mi) wide glacier on the east side of Ravelin Ridge on Clarence Island in the South Shetland Islands, Antarctica situated north of Highton Glacier and south of Orcho Glacier. It drains the slopes of Jerez Peak, flows northeastwards and enters the Southern Ocean south of Gesha Point.

The glacier is named after the settlement of Treskavets in Northeastern Bulgaria.

== Location ==
Treskavets Glacier is centred at 61°13′00″S 54°05′00″W. British mapping in 1972 and 2009.

== See also ==
- List of glaciers in the Antarctic
- Glaciology

== Maps ==
- British Antarctic Territory. Scale 1:200000 topographic map. DOS 610 Series, Sheet W 61 54. Directorate of Overseas Surveys, Tolworth, UK, 1972.
- South Shetland Islands: Elephant, Clarence and Gibbs Islands. Scale 1:220000 topographic map. UK Antarctic Place-names Committee, 2009.
- Antarctic Digital Database (ADD). Scale 1:250000 topographic map of Antarctica. Scientific Committee on Antarctic Research (SCAR). Since 1993, regularly upgraded and updated.
