= Vaglen Point =

Location of Clarence Island in the South Shetland Islands.

Vaglen Point (Bulgarian: нос Въглен, ‘Nos Vaglen’ \'nos 'v&-glen\) is the rock-tipped point on the southwest side of the entrance to Chinstrap Cove on the northwest coast of Clarence Island in the South Shetland Islands, Antarctica.

The point is named after the settlements of Vaglen in Northeastern and Southeastern Bulgaria.

== Location ==
Vaglen Point is located at 61°14′39″S 54°11′53″W, which is 5.75 km north-northeast of Craggy Point and 7.45 km southwest of Humble Point. British mapping in 1972 and 2009.

== Maps ==
- British Antarctic Territory. Scale 1:200000 topographic map. DOS 610 Series, Sheet W 61 54. Directorate of Overseas Surveys, Tolworth, UK, 1972.
- South Shetland Islands: Elephant, Clarence and Gibbs Islands. Scale 1:220000 topographic map. UK Antarctic Place-names Committee, 2009.
- Antarctic Digital Database (ADD). Scale 1:250000 topographic map of Antarctica. Scientific Committee on Antarctic Research (SCAR). Since 1993, regularly upgraded and updated.
