= Bersame Glacier =

Glacier in South Shetland Islands

- Location of Clarence Island in the South Shetland Islands

- Location within South Shetland Islands Location within Antarctica
- Location: Clarence Island; South Shetland Islands
- Coordinates: 61°14′50″S 54°09′00″W
- Length: 1.3 nmi (2 km; 1 mi)
- Width: 0.8 nmi (1 km; 1 mi)
- Thickness: unknown
- Terminus: Giridava Glacier
- Status: unknown

Bersame Glacier (Bulgarian: ледник Берсаме, romanized: lednik Bersame, IPA: [ˈlɛdniɡ ˈbɛrsɐmɛ]) is the 2.4 km long and 1.5 km wide glacier on the west side of Urda Ridge on Clarence Island in the South Shetland Islands, Antarctica situated northeast of Giridava Glacier. It drains the slopes of Mount Llana, flows northwestwards and enters the Southern Ocean northeast of the terminus of Giridava Glacier.

The glacier is named after the Thracian settlement of Bersame in Southeastern Bulgaria.

== Location ==
Bersame Glacier is centred at 61°14′50″S 54°09′00″W. British mapping in 1972 and 2009.

== See also ==
- List of glaciers in the Antarctic
- Glaciology

== Maps ==
- British Antarctic Territory. Scale 1:200000 topographic map. DOS 610 Series, Sheet W 61 54. Directorate of Overseas Surveys, Tolworth, UK, 1972.
- South Shetland Islands: Elephant, Clarence and Gibbs Islands. Scale 1:220000 topographic map. UK Antarctic Place-names Committee, 2009.
- Antarctic Digital Database (ADD). Scale 1:250000 topographic map of Antarctica. Scientific Committee on Antarctic Research (SCAR). Since 1993, regularly upgraded and updated.
