= Banari Glacier =

Glacier in the South Shetland Islands

- Location of Clarence Island in the South Shetland Islands

- Location within South Shetland Islands Location within Antarctica
- Location: Clarence Island; South Shetland Islands
- Coordinates: 61°10′35″S 54°03′50″W
- Length: 1 nautical mile (1.9 km; 1.2 mi)
- Width: 0.6 nautical miles (1.1 km; 0.69 mi)
- Thickness: unknown
- Terminus: Smith Cove
- Status: unknown

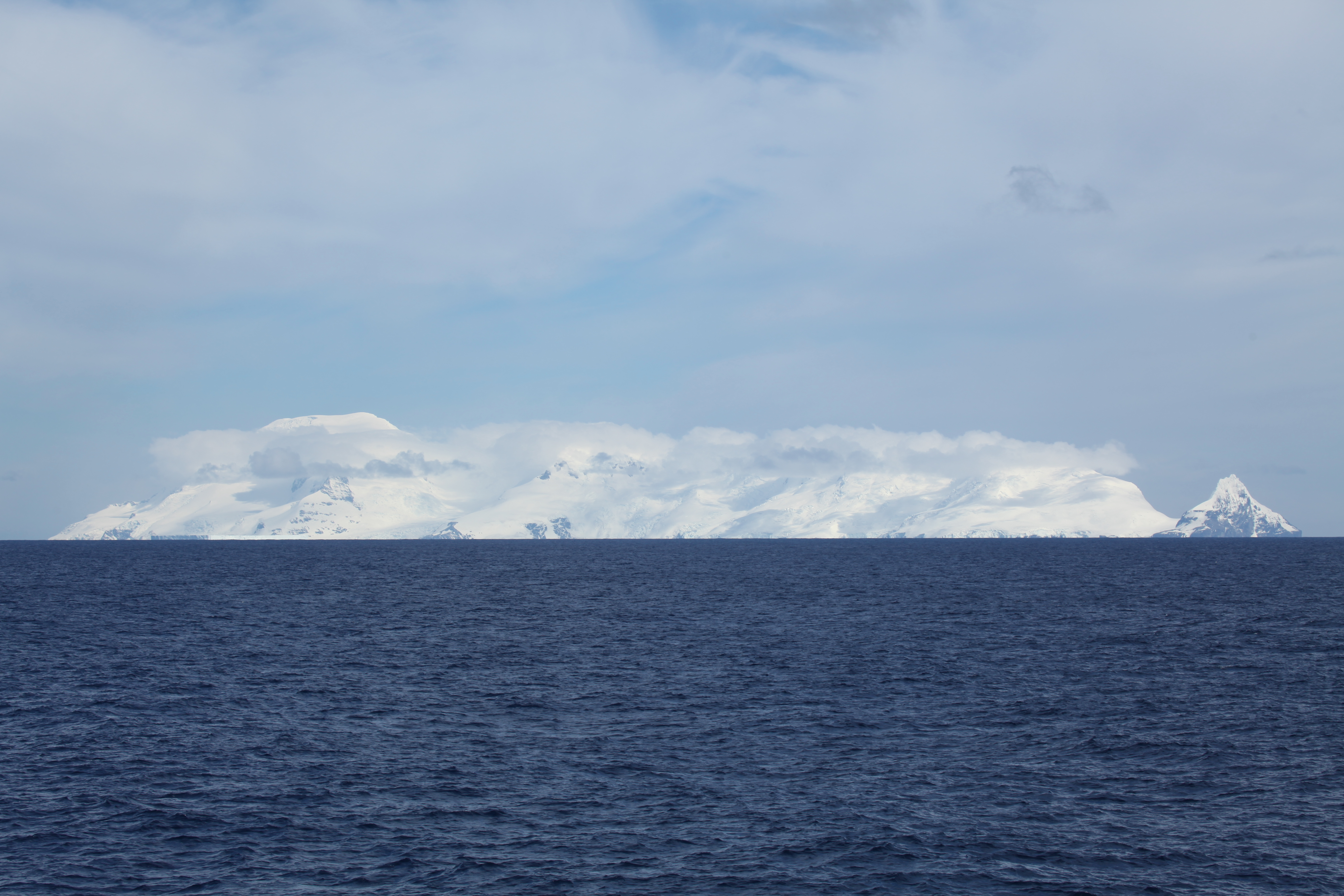
Clarence Island seen from northeast with (left to right) Cape Bowles; Dobrodan Glacier and Highton Glacier surmounted by Urda Ridge; Treskavets Glacier, Orcho Glacier and Banari Glacier surmounted by Ravelin Ridge; and Cape Lloyd

Banari Glacier (Bulgarian: ледник Банари, romanized: lednik Banari, IPA: [ˈlɛdniɡ bɐˈnari]) is the 1 nautical mile (1.9 km; 1.2 mi) long and 0.6 nautical miles (1.1 km; 0.69 mi) wide glacier on the east side of Ravelin Ridge on Clarence Island in the South Shetland Islands, Antarctica situated north-northeast of Orcho Glacier. It flows northeastwards and enters Smith Cove.

The glacier is named after the settlement of Banari in Northern Bulgaria.

== Location ==
Banari Glacier is centred at 61°10′35″S 54°03′50″W. British mapping in 1972 and 2009.

== See also ==
- List of glaciers in the Antarctic
- Glaciology

== Maps ==
- British Antarctic Territory. Scale 1:200000 topographic map. DOS 610 Series, Sheet W 61 54. Directorate of Overseas Surveys, Tolworth, UK, 1972.
- South Shetland Islands: Elephant, Clarence and Gibbs Islands. Scale 1:220000 topographic map. UK Antarctic Place-names Committee, 2009.
- Antarctic Digital Database (ADD). Scale 1:250000 topographic map of Antarctica. Scientific Committee on Antarctic Research (SCAR). Since 1993, regularly upgraded and updated.
