= Chinstrap Cove =

Bay of Antarctica

Coordinates: 61°14′S 54°11′W

Location of Chinstrap Cove in Antarctica

Location of Clarence Island in the South Shetland Islands.

Chinstrap Cove is a cove 6 km (3.7 mi) north-east of Escarpada Point on the north-west coast of Clarence Island, South Shetland Islands, Antarctica entered northeast of Vaglen Point. The cove has been identified as an Important Bird Area (IBA) by BirdLife International because it supports a large breeding colony of about 20,000 pairs of chinstrap penguins, after which it was named by the UK Joint Services Expedition which visited the site in 1970–1971. The 74-hectare (180-acre) IBA includes the ice-free area south of the cove, extending 2 kilometres (1.2 mi) along the coast.
