= Ravelin Ridge =

Ridge in Antarctica

Coordinates: 61°11′S 54°5′W

Location of Clarence Island in the South Shetland Islands.

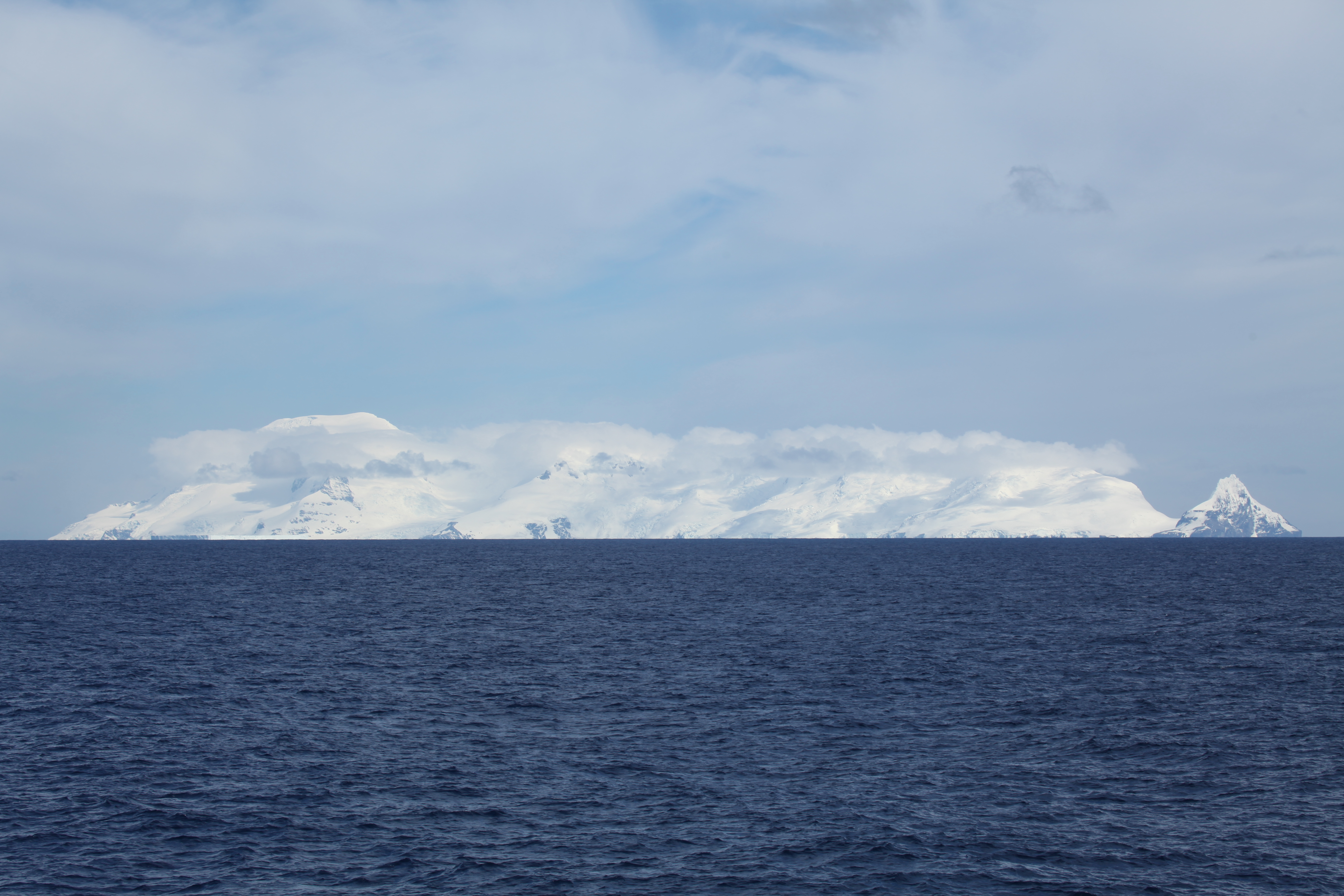
Clarence Island seen from northeast with (left to right) Cape Bowles; Dobrodan Glacier and Highton Glacier surmounted by Urda Ridge; Treskavets Glacier, Orcho Glacier and Banari Glacier surmounted by Ravelin Ridge; and Cape Lloyd.

Ravelin Ridge is a ridge which extends north–south and rises to 1400 m (Jerez Peak) in northern Clarence Island, in the South Shetland Islands of Antarctica. It is connected to Urda Ridge to the south by Soyka Saddle, and has its east slopes drained by Treskavets, Orcho and Banari Glaciers.

The UK Antarctic Place-Names Committee (UK-APC) applied the name in 1971 following mapping by the Joint Services Expedition, 1970-71. The feature resembles a fortification, hence the use of the term "ravelin".
