= Istros Bay =

Location of Clarence Island in the South Shetland Islands.

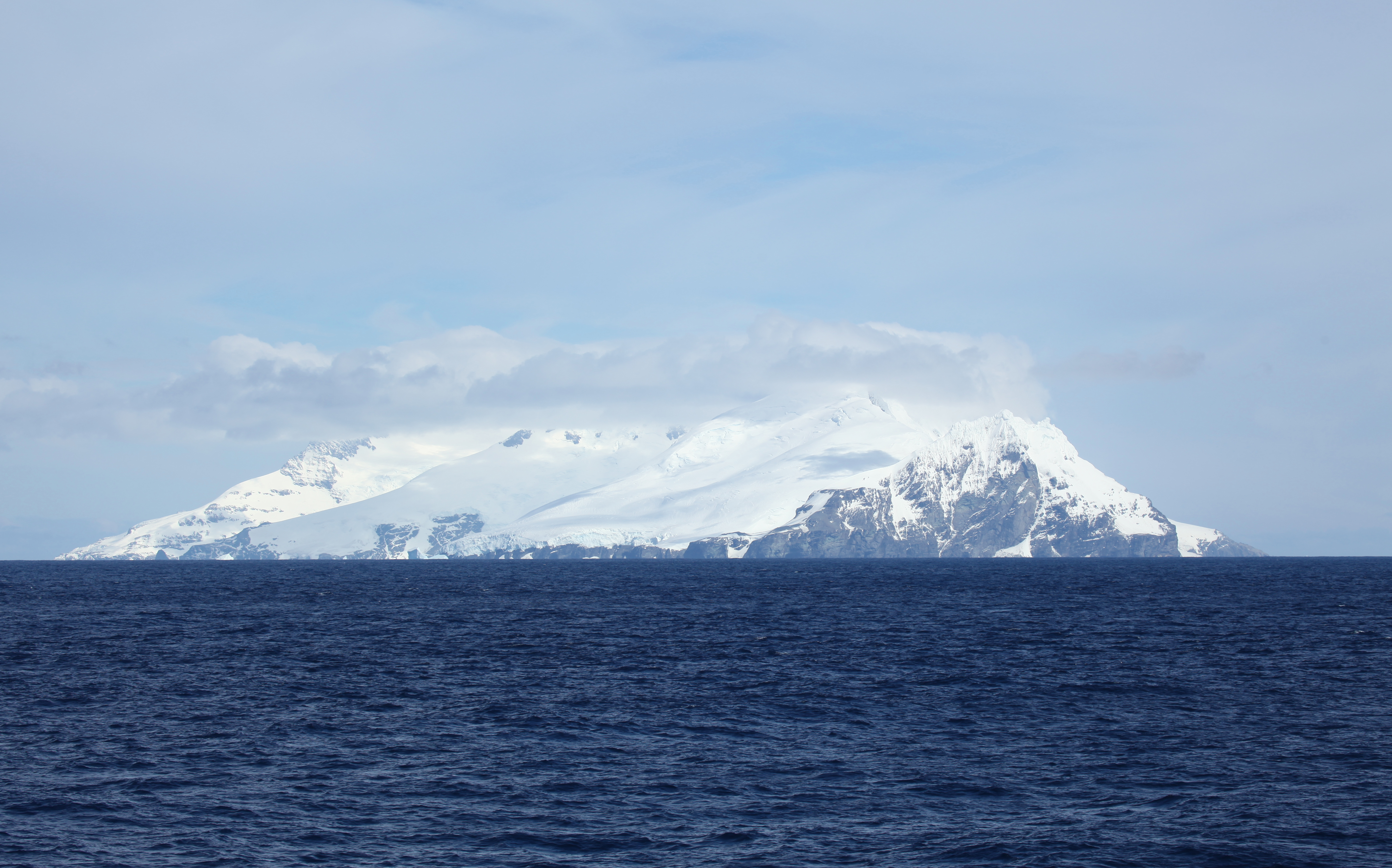
Clarence Island seen from north-northeast with l(left to right) Lebed Point, Istros Bay, Sugarloaf Island and Cape Lloyd.

Istros Bay (Bulgarian: залив Истрос, romanized: zaliv Istros, IPA: [ˈzalif ˈistros]) is the 3.2 km wide bay indenting for 1.4 km the east coast of Clarence Island in the South Shetland Islands, Antarctica. It is entered north of Lebed Point and south of Sugarloaf Island, and has its head fed by Highton Glacier. Istros is the ancient name for the lower Danube River.

== Location ==
Istros Bay is centred at 61°14′15″S 54°02′30″W. British mapping in 1972 and 2009.

== Maps ==
- British Antarctic Territory. Scale 1:200000 topographic map. DOS 610 Series, Sheet W 61 54. Directorate of Overseas Surveys, Tolworth, UK, 1972.
- South Shetland Islands: Elephant, Clarence and Gibbs Islands. Scale 1:220000 topographic map. UK Antarctic Place-names Committee, 2009.
- Antarctic Digital Database (ADD). Scale 1:250000 topographic map of Antarctica. Scientific Committee on Antarctic Research (SCAR). Since 1993, regularly upgraded and updated.
