= Escarpada Point =

Headlands of Antarctica

Coordinates: 61°17′S 54°14′W

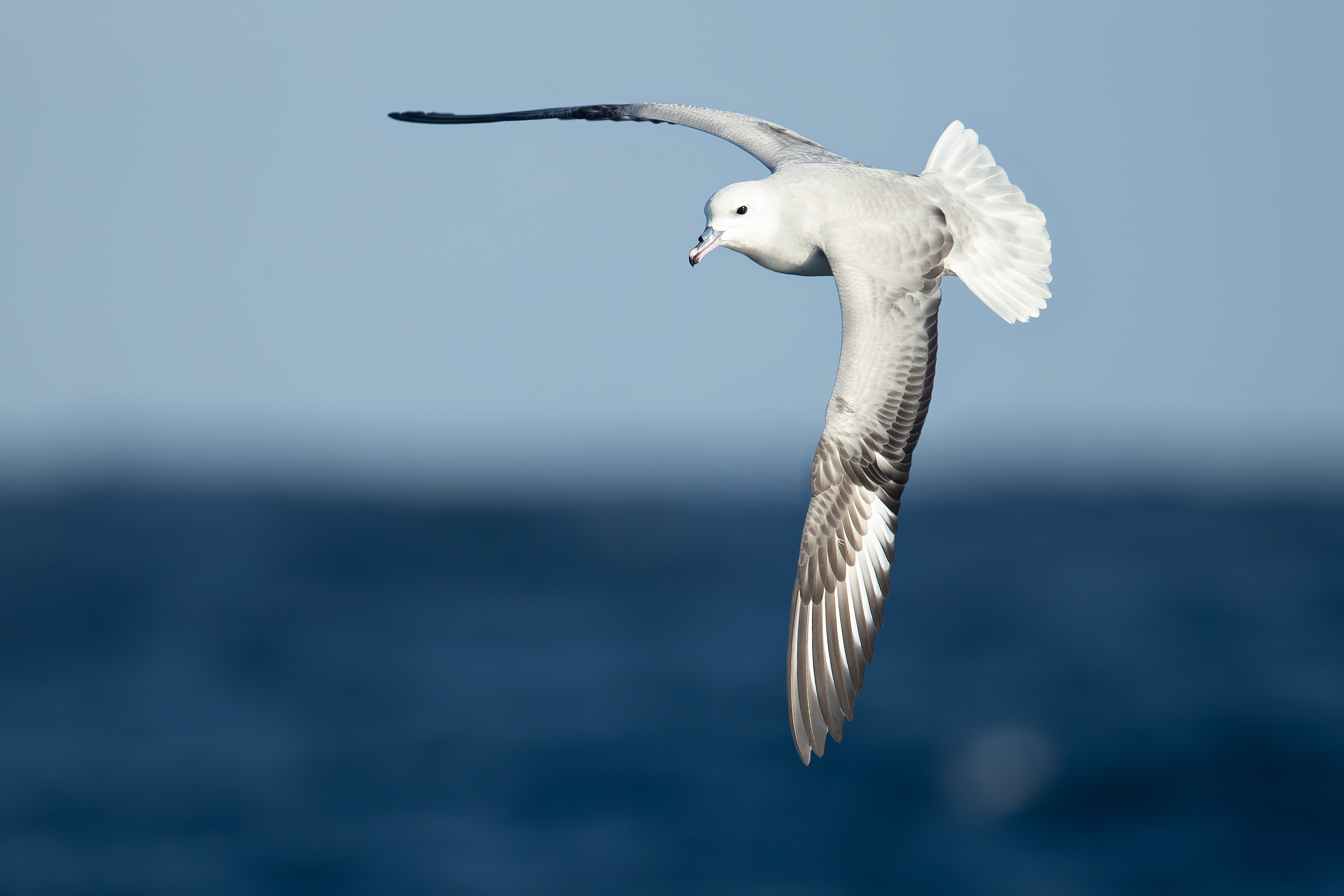
Southern fulmars breed in the IBA

Escarpada Point, also known as Craggy Point (escarpada is Spanish for "craggy"), is the rocky, rugged south-west point of Clarence Island in the South Shetland Islands of Antarctica. The descriptive name was given in the course of Argentine government visits in 1953–1954.

== Important Bird Area ==
The point has been identified as an Important Bird Area (IBA) by BirdLife International because it supports, as well as a large breeding colony of about 10,000 pairs of chinstrap penguins, some 3000 pairs of macaroni penguins and at least 10,000 pairs of southern fulmars. The point lies 6 km south-west of Chinstrap Cove, another IBA.
