= Sugarloaf Island (South Shetland Islands) =

Island of Antarctica

Coordinates: 61°13′13″S 54°01′19.3″W

Location of Clarence Island in the South Shetland Islands

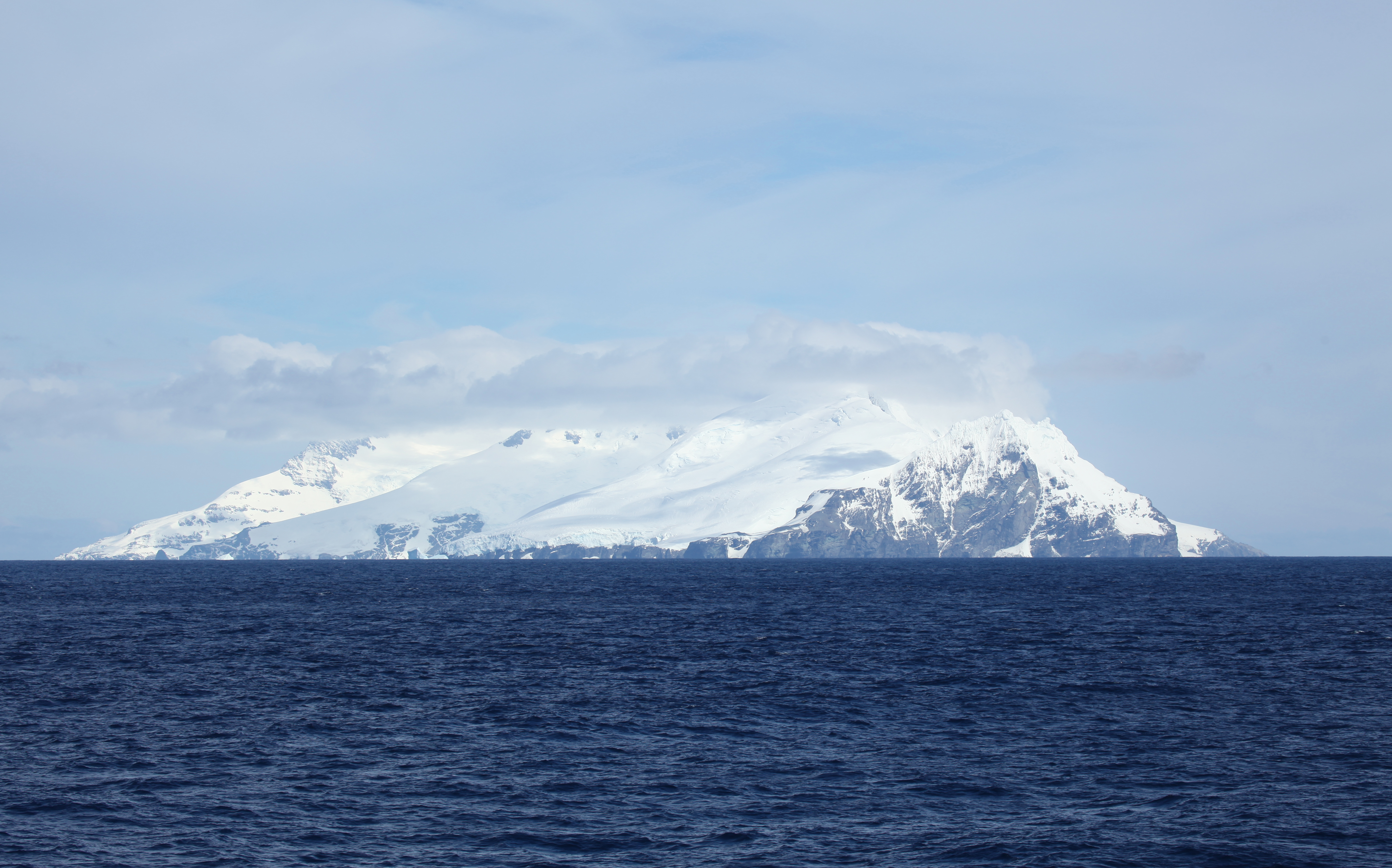
Clarence Island seen from north-north-east with (left to right) Lebed Point, Sugarloaf Island and Cape Lloyd

Sugarloaf Island is a conspicuous small island which lies close to the east side of Clarence Island, midway between Cape Lloyd and Cape Bowles, in the South Shetland Islands, Antarctica. It lies 3.2 km north of Lebed Point, on the northern side of the entrance to Istros Bay. The name was in use by American and British sealers as early as 1822 and is now well established.

== Important Bird Area ==
An 82 ha site, comprising all of Sugarloaf Island, the neighbouring ice-free coastal area of Clarence Island and the intervening marine area, has been designated an Important Bird Area (IBA) by BirdLife International because it supports a total of about 70,000 pairs of chinstrap penguins, as well as some 25,000 pairs of southern fulmars on the adjacent ice-free slopes of Clarence Island.

== Maps ==
- British Antarctic Territory. Scale 1:200000 topographic map. DOS 610 Series, Sheet W 61 54. Directorate of Overseas Surveys, Tolworth, UK, 1972.
- South Shetland Islands: Elephant, Clarence and Gibbs Islands. Scale 1:220000 topographic map. UK Antarctic Place-names Committee, 2009.
- Antarctic Digital Database (ADD). Scale 1:250000 topographic map of Antarctica. Scientific Committee on Antarctic Research (SCAR). Since 1993, regularly upgraded and updated.
