= Mount Irving =

Landform on Clarence Island, in the South Shetland Islands

- Location within Antarctica

Highest point
- Elevation: 1,950 m (6,400 ft)
- Prominence: 1,950 m (6,400 ft)
- Listing: Ultra, Ribu
- Coordinates: 61°15′49.5″S 54°08′31″W

Geography
- Location: Clarence Island, Antarctica

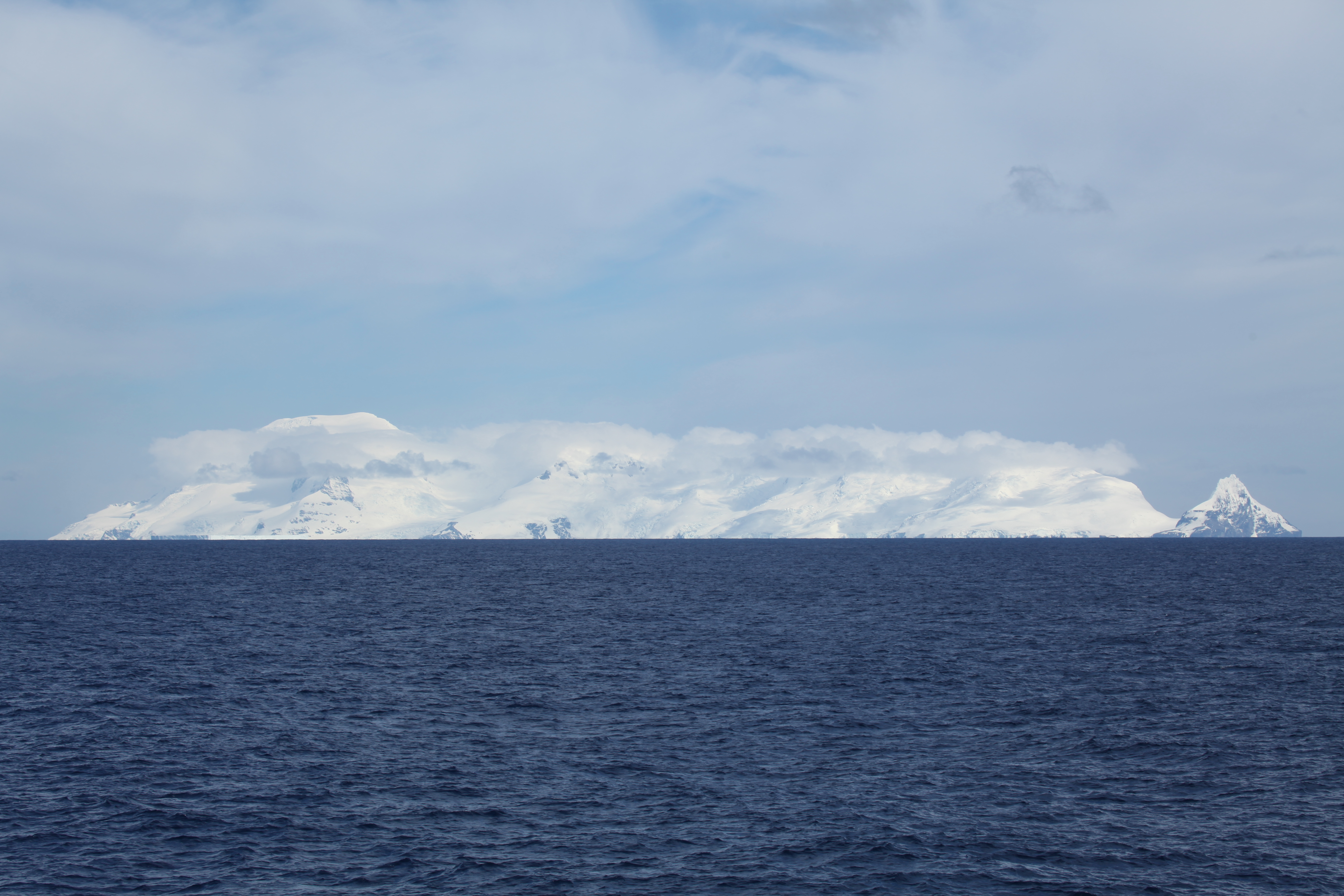
Clarence Island seen from northeast with Mount Irving on the left.

Mount Irving is a mountain rising to ca. 1,950 metres (6,398 ft) that is the dominant elevation on Clarence Island, in the South Shetland Islands, Antarctica. (Some older sources used to give the elevation as 2,300 metres (7,546 ft).) Recent research suggests a lower figure of 1772m. The rounded, heavily glaciated mountain is situated in Urda Ridge occupying the southern part of the island. A prominent feature, the mountain doubtless was known to sealers in the area in the 1820s. It was named by United Kingdom Antarctic Place-Names Committee (UK-APC) for Rear Admiral Sir Edmund George Irving, Royal Navy, Hydrographer of the Navy, 1960–1966. First ascent by a team comprising Capt. Crispin Agnew, John Hult and Flight Sgt George Bruce BEM, RAF. of the Joint Services Expedition to Elephant Island on 6 December 1970.

== See also ==
- List of ultras of Antarctica
