= Cape Bowles =

Headland of Antarctica

Coordinates: 61°19′S 54°6′W

Location of Clarence Island in the South Shetland Islands.

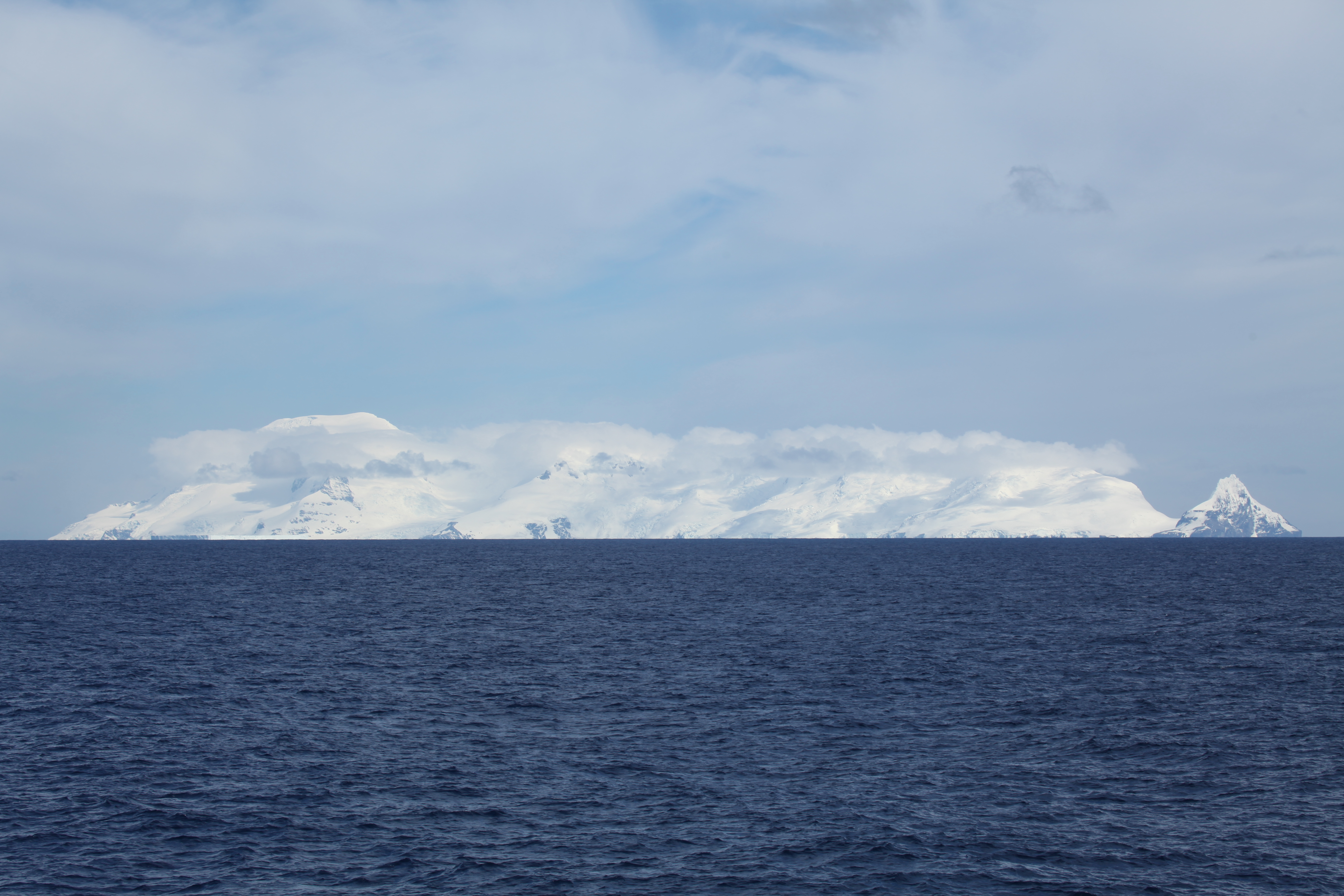
Clarence Island seen from northeast with (left to right) Cape Bowles; Dobrodan Glacier and Highton Glacier surmounted by Duclos-Guyot Bluff and Mount Irving; Treskavets Glacier, Orcho Glacier and Banari Glacier surmounted by Ravelin Ridge; and Cape Lloyd.

Cape Bowles is a cape forming the southern extremity of Clarence Island in the South Shetland Islands of Antarctica. It was named in 1820 by Edward Bransfield, Master, Royal Navy, while exploring the islands in the brig Williams.

== Important Bird Area ==
The site has been identified as an Important Bird Area (IBA) by BirdLife International because it supports a very large breeding colony of over 100,000 pairs of chinstrap penguins.
