= Highton Glacier =

Glacier of the South Shetland Islands

- Location of Clarence Island in the South Shetland Islands

- Location within South Shetland Islands Location within Antarctica
- Location: Clarence Island; South Shetland Islands
- Coordinates: 61°14′S 54°03′W
- Thickness: unknown
- Status: unknown

Highton Glacier (61°14′S 54°3′W) is a glacier on the east coast of Clarence Island in the South Shetland Islands, south of Sugarloaf Island, flowing northeast to the sea. Called "Stamina Glacier" from the stamina needed to cross it by the Joint Services Expedition to the Elephant Island Group, 1976–77, it was named by the UK Antarctic Place-Names Committee in 1980 after Commander John E. Highton, Royal Navy, Deputy Leader of the expedition and in charge of the group on Clarence Island.

== See also ==
- List of glaciers in the Antarctic
- Glaciology
