= Clarence Island (South Shetland Islands) =

Island of the South Shetland Islands

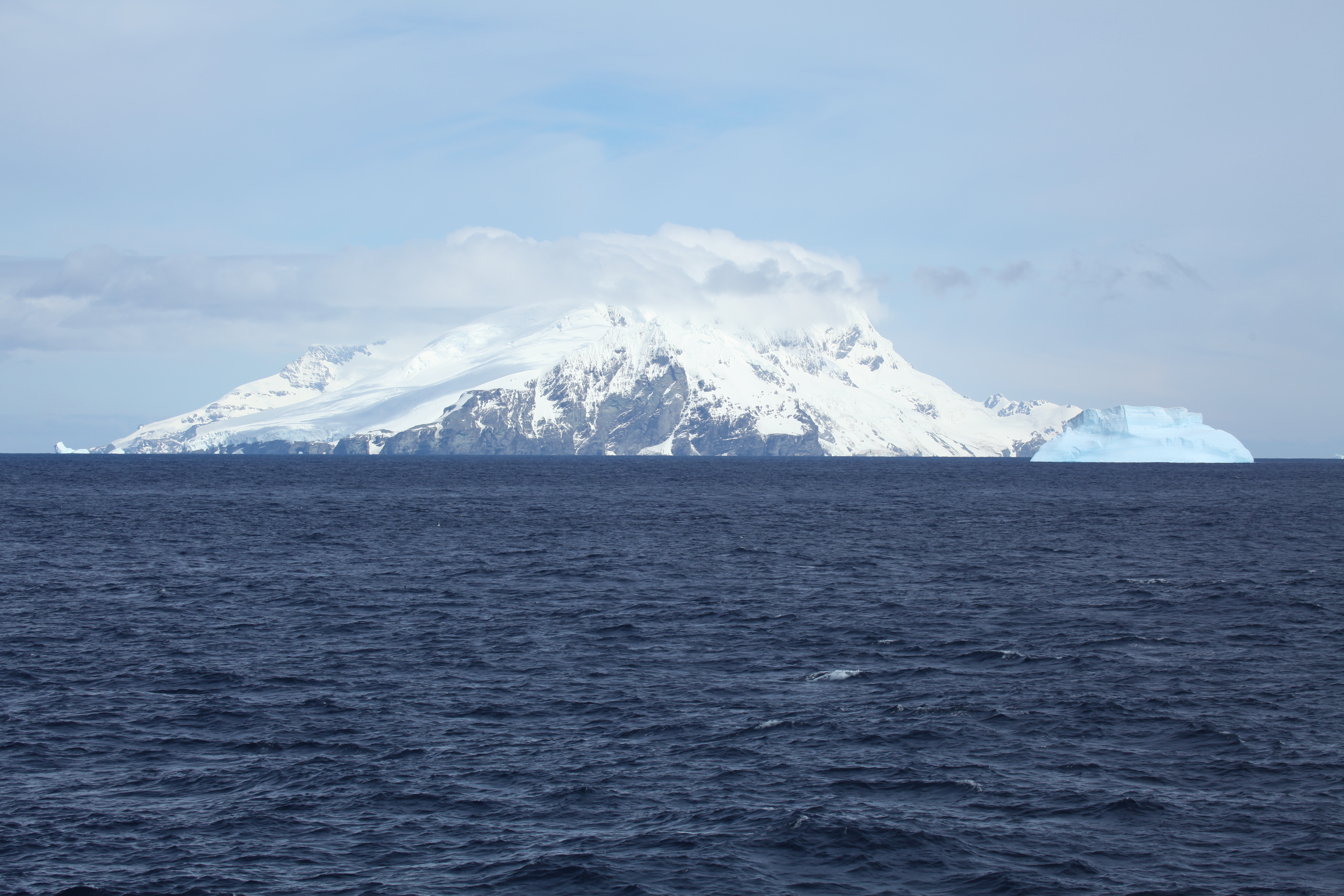
- Clarence Island seen from the north, with Cape Lloyd and Jubilee Peak in the foreground

- Location of Clarence Island

- Location in the South Shetland Islands Location in Antarctica

Geography
- Location: Antarctica
- Coordinates: 61°12′S 054°05′W
- Archipelago: South Shetland Islands
- Area: 114.6 km^{2} (44.2 sq mi)
- Length: 21.46 km (13.335 mi)
- Highest elevation: 1,950 m (6400 ft)
- Highest point: Mount Irving

Administration
- Administered under the Antarctic Treaty System

Demographics
- Population: 0

Clarence Island (Russian: остров Шишкова) is the easternmost island in the South Shetland Islands, off the coast of Antarctica. It is claimed by Argentina as part of Argentine Antarctica, by Britain as part of the British Antarctic Territory, and by Chile as part of the Chilean Antarctic Territory. The name dates back to at least 1820 and is now established in international usage, except for Russia, where it has been known as Shishkova Island since its discovery by the First Russian Antarctic Expedition in 1821.

The island is 21.46 km (13.3 mi) long and oriented in a south-southwest to north-northeast direction. Ravelin Ridge and Urda Ridge occupy the interior of the mountainous island. The summit Mount Irving, 1,950 meters (6,398 ft) high, rises 6.675 km (4.148 mi) north of Cape Bowles, the southernmost point. The southeast slopes of the two ridges are drained by Dobrodan, Highton, Treskavets, Orcho, and Banari Glaciers, and their northwest slopes — by Skaplizo, Giridava, and Bersame Glaciers. There are two small islands just east of Clarence Island, the northern one is named Sugarloaf Island. Chinstrap Cove lies on the northwest coast of the island, while Istros Bay, Smith Cove, and Kutela Cove lie on its southeast side.

Antarctic explorer Ernest Shackleton's Imperial Trans-Antarctic Expedition observed and considered landing on Clarence Island after escaping the pack ice of the Weddell Sea but instead landed on the nearby Elephant Island. The high point on Clarence Island was reached by members of the Joint Services Elephant Island Expedition in 1970, which also completed a survey of Elephant and Clarence Island.

== Maps ==
- Chart of South Shetland including Coronation Island, &c. from the exploration of the sloop Dove in the years 1821 and 1822 by George Powell Commander of the same. Scale ca. 1:200000. London: Laurie, 1822.
- British Antarctic Territory. Scale 1:200000 topographic map. DOS 610 Series, Sheet W 61 54. Directorate of Overseas Surveys, Tolworth, UK, 1972.
- South Shetland Islands: Elephant, Clarence and Gibbs Islands. Scale 1:220000 topographic map. UK Antarctic Place-names Committee, 2009.
- Antarctic Digital Database (ADD). Scale 1:250000 topographic map of Antarctica. Scientific Committee on Antarctic Research (SCAR). Since 1993, regularly upgraded and updated.

== See also ==
- Composite Antarctic Gazetteer
- List of Antarctic islands south of 60° S
- SCAR
- Territorial claims in Antarctica
