= Cape Lloyd =

Cape in the South Shetland Islands of Antarctica

Cape Lloyd lighthouse
- Location: Clarence Island, South Shetland Islands, Cape Lloyd, Antarctica
- Coordinates: 61°07′52″S 54°00′34″W

Tower
- Construction: concrete (foundation), fiberglass (tower)
- Height: 3 m (9.8 ft)
- Shape: cylinder
- Markings: white, stripe (red, horizontal direction)
- Power source: solar power

Light
- Focal height: 113 m (371 ft)
- Range: 5 nmi (9.3 km; 5.8 mi)
- Characteristic: Fl W 10s

Location of Clarence Island in the South Shetland Islands

Cape Lloyd (61°7′S 54°1′W) is a cape which forms the north end of Clarence Island in the South Shetland Islands of Antarctica, on the north side of the entrance to Kutela Cove. The name "Lloyd's Promontory" appears on charts of the 1821–1825 period, but in more recent years the feature has become internationally known as Cape Lloyd.

== See also ==
- List of lighthouses in Antarctica
