= Bulgarian toponyms in Antarctica (D) =

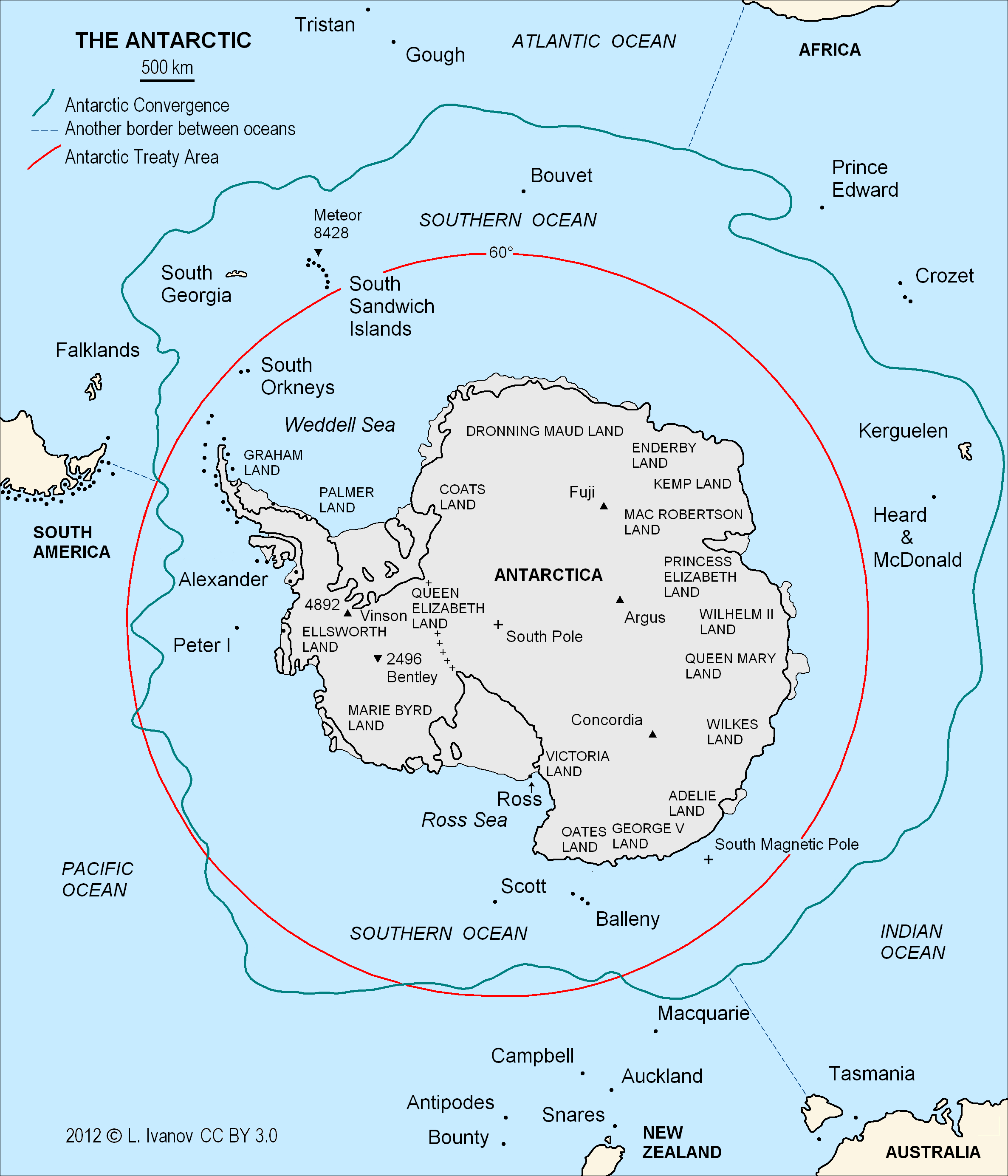
The South Polar Region.

- Dabnik Peak, Trinity Peninsula
- Dabrava Glacier, Graham Coast
- Dalchev Cove, Anvers Island
- Dalgopol Glacier, Smith Island
- Damga Point, Astrolabe Island
- Danailov Peak, Alexander Island
- Dañobeitia Crag, Livingston Island
- Darvari Glacier, Nordenskjöld Coast
- Darzalas Peak, Nordenskjöld Coast
- Daskot Point, Oscar II Coast
- Daveri Hill, Trinity Peninsula
- Davidov Spur, Danco Coast
- Debelt Glacier, Livingston Island
- Debelyanov Point, Robert Island
- Debren Pass, Sentinel Range
- Delchev Peak, Livingston Island
- Delchev Ridge, Livingston Island
- Deliradev Point, Anvers Island
- Delisle Inlet, Wilkins Coast
- Delyan Point, Smith Island
- Delyo Glacier, Sentinel Range
- Desislava Cove, Nordenskjöld Coast
- Desudava Glacier, Nordenskjöld Coast
- Devene Point, Brabant Island
- Devesil Bight, Robert Island
- Devetaki Peak, Oscar II Coast
- Devin Saddle, Livingston Island
- Devnya Valley, Livingston Island
- Mount Devol, Alexander Island
- Digges Cove, Elephant Island
- Dimcha Peak, Oscar II Coast
- Dimitrov Cove, Graham Coast
- Dimitrova Peak, Alexander Island
- Dimkov Glacier, Brabant Island
- Dimov Gate, Livingston Island
- Dinea Island, Greenwich Island
- Dink Island, Trinity Island
- Diomedes Lake, Livingston Island
- Dioptra Island, Low Island
- Diralo Point, Oscar II Coast
- Discoduratere Nunatak, Nelson Island
- Disilitsa Point, Liège Island
- Divdyadovo Glacier, Sentinel Range
- Divotino Point, Robert Island
- Djerassi Glacier, Brabant Island
- Dlagnya Rocks, Livingston Island
- Dobrich Knoll, Livingston Island
- Dobrodan Glacier, Clarence Island
- Dobrudzha Glacier, Livingston Island
- Dodelen Glacier, Brabant Island
- Dodunekov Bluff, Graham Coast
- Dolen Peak, Nordenskjöld Coast
- Dolie Glacier, Graham Coast
- Dometa Point, Livingston Island
- Domino Lake, Snow Island
- Domlyan Bay, Oscar II Coast
- Doriones Saddle, Brabant Island
- Doris Cove, Greenwich Island
- Dorticum Cove, Nelson Island
- Dospat Peak, Livingston Island
- Dospey Heights, Livingston Island
- Doyran Heights, Sentinel Range
- Dragash Point, Dee Island
- Dragoman Glacier, Smith Island
- Dragor Hill, Trinity Peninsula
- Draka Nunatak, Trinity Peninsula
- Dralfa Point, Anvers Island
- Drama Glacier, Sentinel Range
- Drangov Peak, Greenwich Island
- Dreatin Glacier, Trinity Peninsula
- Drenta Bluff, Trinity Peninsula
- Drinov Peak, Smith Island
- Drong Hill, Livingston Island
- Dropla Gap, Sentinel Range
- Drumohar Peak, Astrolabe Island
- Dryad Lake, Livingston Island
- Dryanovo Heights, Greenwich Island
- Duclos-Guyot Bluff, Clarence Island
- Dugerjav Peak, Oscar II Coast
- Duhla Peak, Oscar II Coast
- Dulo Hill, Livingston Island
- Dupnitsa Point, Smith Island
- Duridanov Peak, Sentinel Range
- Durostorum Bay, Oscar II Coast
- Dymcoff Crag, Nordenskjöld Coast
- Dzhebel Glacier, Oscar II Coast
- Dzhegov Rock, Cornwallis Island

== See also ==
- Bulgarian toponyms in Antarctica

== Bibliography ==
- J. Stewart. Antarctica: An Encyclopedia. Jefferson, N.C. and London: McFarland, 2011. 1771 pp. ISBN 978-0-7864-3590-6
- L. Ivanov. Bulgarian Names in Antarctica. Sofia: Manfred Wörner Foundation, 2021. Second edition. 539 pp. ISBN 978-619-90008-5-4 (in Bulgarian)
- G. Bakardzhieva. Bulgarian toponyms in Antarctica. Paisiy Hilendarski University of Plovdiv: Research Papers. Vol. 56, Book 1, Part A, 2018 – Languages and Literature, pp. 104-119 (in Bulgarian)
- L. Ivanov and N. Ivanova. Bulgarian names. In: The World of Antarctica. Generis Publishing, 2022. pp. 114-115. ISBN 979-8-88676-403-1
