= Isbul Point =

Narrow rocky point in the South Shetland Islands, Antarctica

Location of Byers Peninsula on Livingston Island in the South Shetland Islands.

Topographic map of Byers Peninsula featuring Antarctic Specially Protected Area ASPA 126 and its two restricted zones

Topographic map of Livingston Island.

Isbul Point (Bulgarian: нос Исбул, ‘Nos Isbul’ \'nos is-'bul\) is a narrow rocky point projecting 600 m from the coast of Ray Promontory into Svishtov Cove in the northwest extremity of Byers Peninsula, Livingston Island in the South Shetland Islands, Antarctica. It is situated 750 m east-northeast of Start Point, 1.46 km southwest of Essex Point and 1.23 km west-southwest of Kardzhali Point. Forming the east side of the entrance to Belene Cove.

The feature is part of the Antarctic Specially Protected Area ASPA 126 Byers Peninsula, situated in one of its restricted zones.

The point is named after Kavhan Isbul, a prominent military commander, diplomat, and Regent of Bulgaria during the minorities of Khan Malamir and Khan Presian (9th Century AD).

== Location ==
Isbul Point is located at 62°35′10.8″S 61°12′19.4″W. British mapping in 1968, Spanish in 1993, and Bulgarian in 2005 and 2009.

== Maps ==
- L.L. Ivanov. Antarctica: Livingston Island and Greenwich, Robert, Snow and Smith Islands. Scale 1:120000 topographic map. Troyan: Manfred Wörner Foundation, 2009. ISBN 978-954-92032-6-4
- Antarctic Digital Database (ADD). Scale 1:250000 topographic map of Antarctica. Scientific Committee on Antarctic Research (SCAR). Since 1993, regularly upgraded and updated.
- L.L. Ivanov. Antarctica: Livingston Island and Smith Island. Scale 1:100000 topographic map. Manfred Wörner Foundation, 2017. ISBN 978-619-90008-3-0
