= Enrique Hill =

Ice-free hill in the South Shetland Islands, Antarctica

Location of Byers Peninsula, Livingston Island in the South Shetland Islands.

Topographic map of Byers Peninsula featuring Antarctic Specially Protected Area ASPA 126 and its two restricted zones

Topographic map of Livingston Island and Smith Island.

Enrique Hill (Bulgarian: хълм Енрике, ‘Halm Enrique’ \'h&lm en-'ri-ke\) is the ice-free hill rising to 156 m in Dospey Heights on the Ray Promontory of Byers Peninsula, Livingston Island in the South Shetland Islands, Antarctica. It surmounts Barclay Bay to the east and northeast, and Diomedes Lake on the southeast

The feature is part of the Antarctic Specially Protected Area ASPA 126 Byers Peninsula, situated in one of its restricted zones.

The hill is named after the Jordi Enrique from Juan Carlos I Base who, together with Francesc Sàbat, made the first ascent of the island's summit Mount Friesland (1700 m) on 30 December 1991.

== Location ==
Enrique Hill is located at 62°35′55.3″S 61°07′37.1″W, which is 1.54 km east-northeast of Dulo Hill, 850 m east-southeast of Battenberg Hill and 1.4 km northwest of Penca Hill. Spanish mapping in 1992, and Bulgarian in 2009 and 2017.

== Maps ==
- Península Byers, Isla Livingston. Mapa topográfico a escala 1:25000. Madrid: Servicio Geográfico del Ejército, 1992.
- L.L. Ivanov et al. Antarctica: Livingston Island and Greenwich Island, South Shetland Islands. Scale 1:100000 topographic map. Sofia: Antarctic Place-names Commission of Bulgaria, 2005.
- L.L. Ivanov. Antarctica: Livingston Island and Greenwich, Robert, Snow and Smith Islands. Scale 1:120000 topographic map. Troyan: Manfred Wörner Foundation, 2009. ISBN 978-954-92032-6-4
- Antarctic Digital Database (ADD). Scale 1:250000 topographic map of Antarctica. Scientific Committee on Antarctic Research (SCAR). Since 1993, regularly upgraded and updated.
- L.L. Ivanov. Antarctica: Livingston Island and Smith Island. Scale 1:100000 topographic map. Manfred Wörner Foundation, 2017. ISBN 978-619-90008-3-0
