= Bulgarian toponyms in Antarctica (G) =

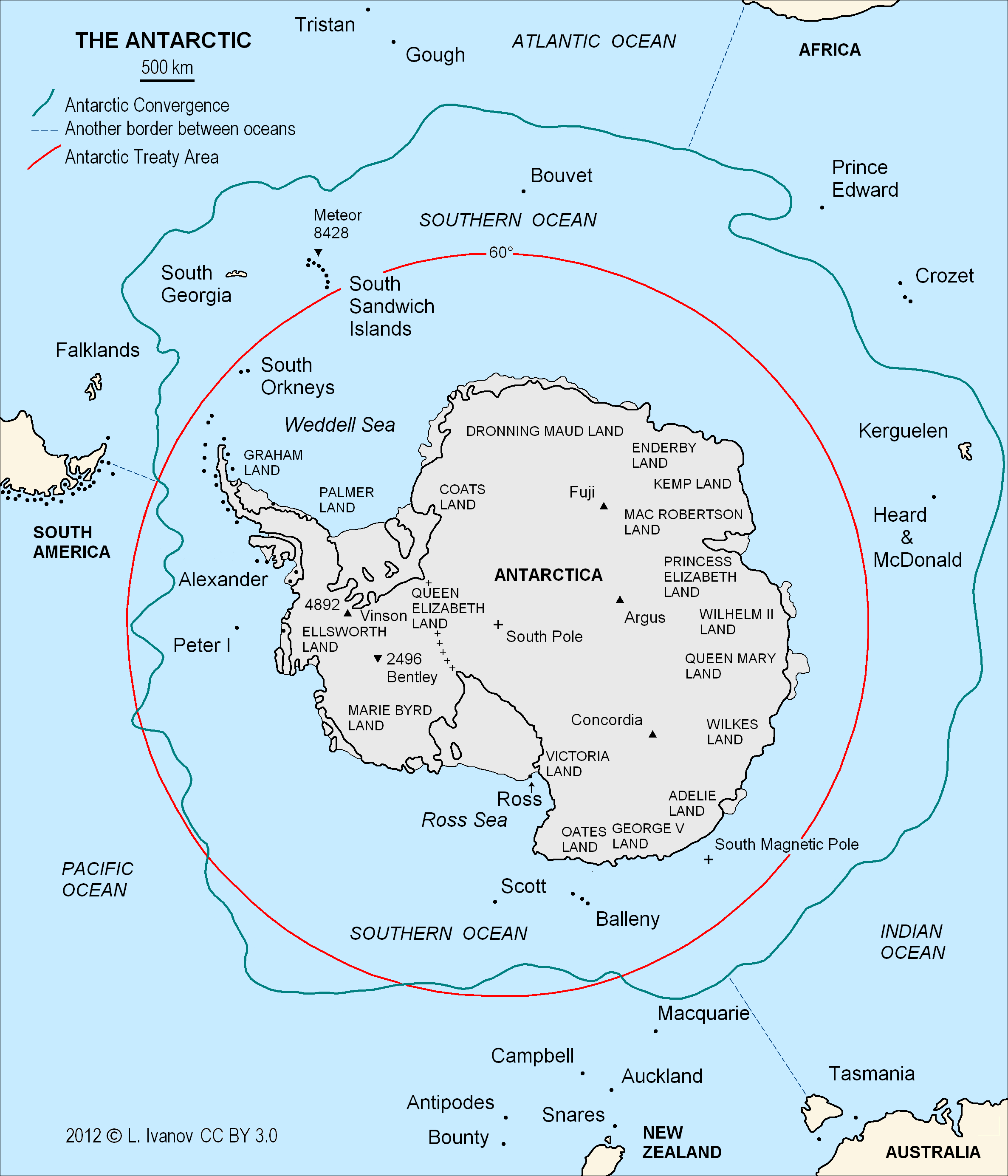
The South Polar Region.

- Gabare Glacier, Sentinel Range
- Gabrovo Knoll, Livingston Island
- Galabinov Spur, Danco Coast
- Galabov Ridge, Alexander Island
- Galata Cove, Anvers Island
- Galerius Peak, Alexander Island
- Galiche Rock, Robert Island
- Galicia Peak, Vinson Massif
- Garbel Point, Liège Island
- Garmen Point, Smith Island
- Garnya Cove, Robert Island
- Garvan Point, Trinity Peninsula
- Gaydari Peak, Graham Coast
- Gaydarov Point, Cornwallis Island
- Gega Point, Astrolabe Island
- Gela Point, Livingston Island
- Gergini Reef, Snow Island
- Gerila Glacier, Sentinel Range
- Gerlovo Beach, Livingston Island
- German Peninsula, Fallières Coast
- Gerov Pass, Livingston Island
- Gerritsz Bay, Anvers Island
- Gesha Point, Clarence Island
- Ghiaurov Peak, Livingston Island
- Mount Ghiuselev, Brabant Island
- Gigen Peak, Trinity Peninsula
- Gilbert Spur, Sentinel Range
- Ginkgo Tarn, Nelson Island
- Giridava Glacier, Clarence Island
- Glarus Island, Trinity Island
- Glavinitsa Peak, Fallières Coast
- Glazne Buttress, Nordenskjöld Coast
- Glogovo Passage, Greenwich Island
- Glozhene Cove, Smith Island
- Gluhar Hill, Foyn Coast
- Glumche Island, Low Island
- Godech Nunatak, Livingston Island
- Golemani Peak, Sentinel Range
- Goleminov Point, Alexander Island
- Golesh Bluff, Trinity Peninsula
- Goloe Pass, Sentinel Range
- Golyam Sechko Cove, Nelson Island
- Gomotartsi Knoll, Graham Coast
- Goreme Col, Sentinel Range
- Gorichane Glacier, Brabant Island
- Goritsa Rocks, Livingston Island
- Gornik Knoll, Trinity Peninsula
- Gorublyane Knoll, Trinity Peninsula
- Gostilya Point, Loubet Coast
- Gostun Point, Snow Island
- Goten Peninsula, Anvers Island
- Govedare Peak, Oscar II Coast
- Gramada Glacier, Smith Island
- Grand Lagoon, Livingston Island
- Graovo Rocks, Robert Island
- Greben Hill, Trinity Peninsula
- Greblo Island, Wilhelm Archipelago
- Gredaro Point, Trinity Peninsula
- Grigorov Glacier, Brabant Island
- Grivitsa Ridge, Nordenskjöld Coast
- Grod Island, Robert Island
- Groma Rock, Low Island
- Gromshin Heights, Sentinel Range
- Grozden Peak, Fallières Coast
- Gruev Cove, Greenwich Island
- Guangzhou Peninsula, Nelson Island
- Gubesh Peak, Sentinel Range
- Gurev Gap, Livingston Island
- Gurgulyat Peak, Trinity Peninsula
- Gurkovska Cove, Elephant Island
- Gusla Peak, Nordenskjöld Coast
- Gutsal Ridge, Brabant Island

== See also ==
- Bulgarian toponyms in Antarctica

== Bibliography ==
- J. Stewart. Antarctica: An Encyclopedia. Jefferson, N.C. and London: McFarland, 2011. 1771 pp. ISBN 978-0-7864-3590-6
- L. Ivanov. Bulgarian Names in Antarctica. Sofia: Manfred Wörner Foundation, 2021. Second edition. 539 pp. ISBN 978-619-90008-5-4 (in Bulgarian)
- G. Bakardzhieva. Bulgarian toponyms in Antarctica. Paisiy Hilendarski University of Plovdiv: Research Papers. Vol. 56, Book 1, Part A, 2018 – Languages and Literature, pp. 104-119 (in Bulgarian)
- L. Ivanov and N. Ivanova. Bulgarian names. In: The World of Antarctica. Generis Publishing, 2022. pp. 114-115. ISBN 979-8-88676-403-1
