= Sàbat Hill =

Ice-free hill in the South Shetland Islands, Antarctica

Location of Byers Peninsula, Livingston Island in the South Shetland Islands

Topographic map of Byers Peninsula featuring Antarctic Specially Protected Area ASPA 126 and its two restricted zones

Topographic map of Livingston Island

Sàbat Hill (Bulgarian: хълм Сабат, ‘Halm Sàbat’ \'h&lm 'sa-bat\) is the ice-free hill rising to 151 m in Dospey Heights on the Ray Promontory of Byers Peninsula, Livingston Island in the South Shetland Islands, Antarctica. Surmounting Richards Cove to the west-northwest and Barclay Bay to the east.

The feature is part of the Antarctic Specially Protected Area ASPA 126 Byers Peninsula, situated in one of its restricted zones.

The hill is named after Francesc Sàbat from Juan Carlos I Base who, together with Jorge Enrique, made the first ascent of the island's summit Mount Friesland (1700 m) on 30 December 1991.

== Location ==
Sàbat Hill is located at 62°34′59.8″S 61°08′18.0″W, which is 1.36 km north of Battenberg Hill, and 560 m southeast of Voyteh Point that is formed by an offshoot of the hill. Spanish mapping in 1992, and Bulgarian in 2010.

== Maps ==
- Península Byers, Isla Livingston. Mapa topográfico a escala 1:25000. Madrid: Servicio Geográfico del Ejército, 1992.
- L.L. Ivanov et al. Antarctica: Livingston Island and Greenwich Island, South Shetland Islands. Scale 1:100000 topographic map. Sofia: Antarctic Place-names Commission of Bulgaria, 2005.
- L.L. Ivanov. Antarctica: Livingston Island and Greenwich, Robert, Snow and Smith Islands. Scale 1:120000 topographic map. Troyan: Manfred Wörner Foundation, 2009. ISBN 978-954-92032-6-4
- L.L. Ivanov. Antarctica: Livingston Island and Smith Island. Scale 1:100000 topographic map. Manfred Wörner Foundation, 2017. ISBN 978-619-90008-3-0
