= Aglen =

Aglen may refer to:

- Aglen, Bulgaria, a village in Bulgaria
- Aglen, Iran, a village in Iran
- Aglen Point, a promontory in Antarctica
- Anthony John Aglen, British administrator
- Francis Aglen, British diplomat serving in China
- The RPG-26, a disposable anti-tank rocket-propelled grenade launcher.
