= Rame Bluff =

Rocky headland on the southwest side of Ray Promontory

Location of Byers Peninsula, Livingston Island in the South Shetland Islands.

Topographic map of Byers Peninsula featuring Antarctic Specially Protected Area ASPA 126 and its two restricted zones

Rame Bluff is a rocky headland on the southwest side of Ray Promontory formed by an offshoot of Dulo Hill, and marking the northern limit of President Beaches on Byers Peninsula, Livingston Island in the South Shetland Islands, Antarctica. The area was visited by 19th century sealers.

The feature is part of the Antarctic Specially Protected Area ASPA 126 Byers Peninsula, situated in one of its restricted zones.

The feature is named after the locality of Rame in Cornwall, UK.

== Location ==
The point is located at 62°35′54.9″S 61°10′50″W which is 2.12 km southeast of Start Point, 2.9 km southwest of Voyteh Point, 4.66 km north-northwest of Laager Point and 2.77 km north-northeast of Herring Point, Rugged Island (British mapping in 1968, detailed Spanish mapping in 1992, and Bulgarian mapping in 2005 and 2009).

== Maps ==
- Península Byers, Isla Livingston. Mapa topográfico a escala 1:25000. Madrid: Servicio Geográfico del Ejército, 1992.
- L.L. Ivanov et al. Antarctica: Livingston Island and Greenwich Island, South Shetland Islands. Scale 1:100000 topographic map. Sofia: Antarctic Place-names Commission of Bulgaria, 2005.
- L.L. Ivanov. Antarctica: Livingston Island and Greenwich, Robert, Snow and Smith Islands. Scale 1:120000 topographic map. Troyan: Manfred Wörner Foundation, 2009. ISBN 978-954-92032-6-4
