= Dzhegov Rock =

Geological formation

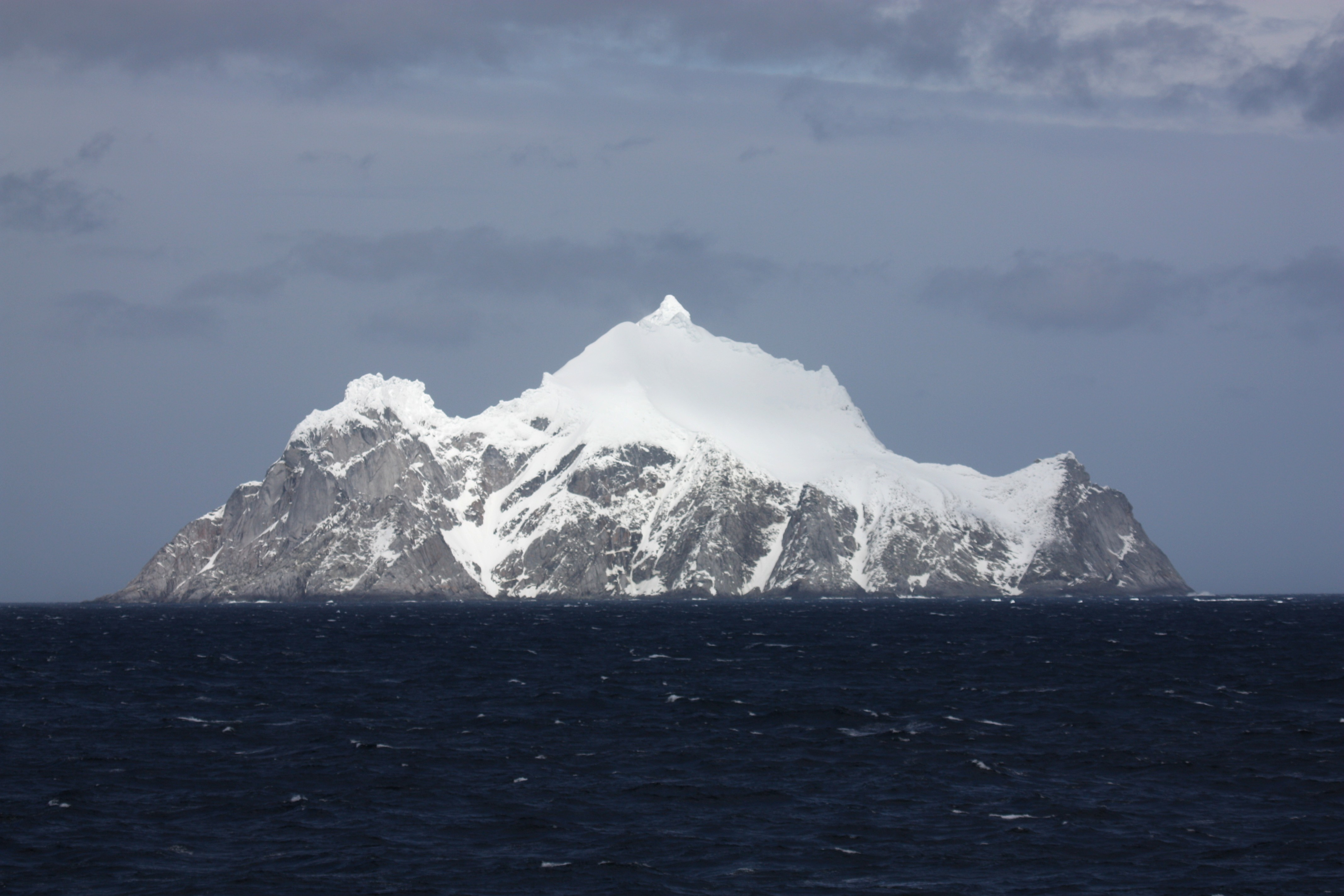
- Cornwallis Island

- Location within Antarctica

Geography
- Location: Antarctica
- Coordinates: 61°04′58.2″S 54°28′21″W
- Archipelago: South Shetland Islands
- Length: 40 m (130 ft)
- Width: 30 m (100 ft)

Administration
- Administered under the Antarctic Treaty System

Demographics
- Population: uninhabited

Dzhegov Rock (Bulgarian: Джегова скала, ‘Dzhegova Skala’ \'dzhe-go-va ska-'la\) is the solitary rock in eastern Prince Charles Strait, South Shetland Islands in Antarctica extending 40 m in southeast-northwest direction and 30 m in southwest-northeast direction. It is “named after Captain Simeon Dzhegov (1938–2011), Director in 1987 of the Bulgarian company Ocean Fisheries – Burgas whose ships operated in the waters of South Georgia, Kerguelen, the South Orkney Islands, South Shetland Islands and Antarctic Peninsula from 1970 to the early 1990s. The Bulgarian fishermen, along with those of the Soviet Union, Poland and East Germany are the pioneers of modern Antarctic fishing industry.”

== Location ==
Dzhegov Rock is located at 61°04′58.2″S 54°28′21″W, which is 1.2 km south-southeast of the west extremity of Cornwallis Island, 700 m west-southwest of its south extremity Gaydarov Point, and 9.9 km east-northeast of Cape Valentine on Elephant Island. British mapping of the area in 1822, 1972 and 2009.

== Maps ==
- Chart of South Shetland including Coronation Island, &c. from the exploration of the sloop Dove in the years 1821 and 1822 by George Powell Commander of the same. Scale ca. 1:200000. London: Laurie, 1822.
- British Antarctic Territory. Scale 1:200000 topographic map. DOS 610 Series, Sheet W 61 54. Directorate of Overseas Surveys. Tolworth, UK, 1972
- South Shetland Islands: Elephant, Clarence and Gibbs Islands. Scale 1:220000 topographic map. UK Antarctic Place-names Committee, 2009
- Antarctic Digital Database (ADD). Scale 1:250000 topographic map of Antarctica. Scientific Committee on Antarctic Research (SCAR). Since 1993, regularly upgraded and updated
