= Algan =

Algan (Chagatai: آلگن or آلگان) may refer to:

- Algen, Kohgiluyeh and Boyer-Ahmad (الگن - Algen)
- Algan, Markazi (الگان - Algān)
- Algan, Qom (الگان - Algān)
- Algan (horse), French-trained racehorse active in the 1990s

== People with the surname ==
- Ayla Algan (1937–2024), Turkish actress and singer
- Zeynep Sibel Algan (born 1955), Turkish female diplomat

== Other uses ==
- Aluminium gallium nitride (AlGaN), a semiconductor material
