= Drong Hill =

Hill on Byers Peninsula, Livingston Island

Location of Byers Peninsula on Livingston Island in the South Shetland Islands.

Topographic map of Byers Peninsula featuring Antarctic Specially Protected Area ASPA 126 and its two restricted zones

Topographic map of Livingston Island, Greenwich, Robert, Snow and Smith Islands.

Drong Hill (Bulgarian: хълм Дронг, ‘Halm Drong’ \'h&lm 'drong\) is the double rocky hill rising to 179 m in the northwest extremity of Dospey Heights on Byers Peninsula, Livingston Island in the South Shetland Islands, Antarctica. Situated 550 m east-southeast of Essex Point, 1.52 km west of Voyteh Point and 600 m northeast of Kardzhali Point.

The feature is part of the Antarctic Specially Protected Area ASPA 126 Byers Peninsula, situated in one of its restricted zones.

The hill is named after the Bulgar ruler Drong (6th Century AD).

== Location ==
Drong Hill is located at 62°34′44″S 61°10′23″W. Spanish mapping in 1992 and Bulgarian in 2009.

== Maps ==
- Península Byers, Isla Livingston. Mapa topográfico a escala 1:25000. Madrid: Servicio Geográfico del Ejército, 1992.
- L.L. Ivanov. Antarctica: Livingston Island and Greenwich, Robert, Snow and Smith Islands. Scale 1:120000 topographic map. Troyan: Manfred Wörner Foundation, 2009. ISBN 978-954-92032-6-4
