= Belene Cove =

Location of Byers Peninsula on Livingston Island in the South Shetland Islands.

Topographic map of Livingston Island, Greenwich, Robert, Snow and Smith Islands.

Belene Cove (Bulgarian: залив Белене, romanized: zaliv Belene, IPA: [ˈzaliv ˈbɛlɛnɛ]) is the 520 m wide cove indenting for 690 m the northwest coast of Ray Promontory, part of Svishtov Cove in Byers Peninsula, Livingston Island in the South Shetland Islands, Antarctica. The cove is entered between Isbul Point and Start Point.

The feature is named after the town of Belene in northern Bulgaria.

== Location ==
Belene Cove is located at 62°35′22″S 61°12′26″W. British mapping in 1968, Spanish in 1993 and Bulgarian in 2009.

== Maps ==
- L.L. Ivanov. Antarctica: Livingston Island and Greenwich, Robert, Snow and Smith Islands. Scale 1:120000 topographic map. Troyan: Manfred Wörner Foundation, 2009. ISBN 978-954-92032-6-4
