= Aglen Point =

Rocky point in the South Shetland Islands, Antarctica

Location of Byers Peninsula on Livingston Island in the South Shetland Islands

Map of Byers Peninsula featuring Antarctic Specially Protected Area ASPA 126 and its two restricted zones

Topographic map of Livingston Island and Smith Island

Aglen Point (Bulgarian: нос Ъглен, romanized: nos Aglen, IPA: [ˈnɔs ɐˈɡlɛn]) is a rocky point forming the west side of the entrance to Richards Cove on the north coast of Ray Promontory in the northwestern part of Byers Peninsula on Livingston Island in the South Shetland Islands, Antarctica. Situated 470 m west of Voyteh Point and 1.6 km east of Essex Point. The area was visited by early 19th century Russian sealers.

The feature is part of the Antarctic Specially Protected Area ASPA 126 Byers Peninsula, situated in one of its restricted zones.

The point is named after the settlement of Aglen in northern Bulgaria.

== Location ==
Aglen Point is located at 62°34′41″S 61°09′14″W. British mapping in 1968, Spanish in 1993 and Bulgarian in 2005 and 2009.

== Maps ==
- Península Byers, Isla Livingston. Mapa topográfico a escala 1:25000. Madrid: Servicio Geográfico del Ejército, 1992.
- L.L. Ivanov. Antarctica: Livingston Island and Greenwich, Robert, Snow and Smith Islands. Scale 1:120000 topographic map. Troyan: Manfred Wörner Foundation, 2009. ISBN 978-954-92032-6-4
- Antarctic Digital Database (ADD). Scale 1:250000 topographic map of Antarctica. Scientific Committee on Antarctic Research (SCAR). Since 1993, regularly upgraded and updated.
- L.L. Ivanov. Antarctica: Livingston Island and Smith Island. Scale 1:100000 topographic map. Manfred Wörner Foundation, 2017. ISBN 978-619-90008-3-0
