= Kardzhali Point =

Rocky point in the South Shetland Islands, Antarctica

Location of Byers Peninsula on Livingston Island in the South Shetland Islands.

Topographic map of Byers Peninsula featuring Antarctic Specially Protected Area ASPA 126 and its two restricted zones

Topographic map of Livingston Island and Smith Island

Kardzhali Point (Bulgarian: нос Кърджали, ‘Nos Kardzhali’ \'nos 'k&r-dzha-li\) is the rocky point forming the south side of the entrance to Ograzhden Cove on the northwest coast of Ray Promontory of Byers Peninsula, Livingston Island in the South Shetland Islands, Antarctica. It is situated 680 m south of Essex Point, 1.23 km east-northeast of Isbul Point and 1.98 km east-northeast of Start Point.

The feature is part of the Antarctic Specially Protected Area ASPA 126 Byers Peninsula, situated in one of its restricted zones.

The point is named after the town of Kardzhali in southern Bulgaria.

== Location ==
Kardzhali Point is located at 62°34′59.3″S 61°10′57″W. British mapping in 1968, Spanish in 1993 and Bulgarian in 2009.

== Maps ==
- Península Byers, Isla Livingston. Mapa topográfico a escala 1:25000. Madrid: Servicio Geográfico del Ejército, 1992.
- L.L. Ivanov. Antarctica: Livingston Island and Greenwich, Robert, Snow and Smith Islands. Scale 1:120000 topographic map. Troyan: Manfred Wörner Foundation, 2010. ISBN 978-954-92032-9-5 (First edition 2009. ISBN 978-954-92032-6-4)
- Antarctic Digital Database (ADD). Scale 1:250000 topographic map of Antarctica. Scientific Committee on Antarctic Research (SCAR). Since 1993, regularly upgraded and updated.
- L.L. Ivanov. Antarctica: Livingston Island and Smith Island. Scale 1:100000 topographic map. Manfred Wörner Foundation, 2017. ISBN 978-619-90008-3-0
