= Ograzhden Cove =

Cove in the South Shetland Islands, Antarctica

Location of Byers Peninsula on Livingston Island in the South Shetland Islands.

Topographic map of Livingston Island

Ograzhden Cove (Bulgarian: залив Огражден, romanized: zaliv Ograzhden, IPA: [ˈzalif oˈɡraʒdɛn]) is the 680 m wide cove indenting for 550 m the northwest coast of Ray Promontory, part of Svishtov Cove in Byers Peninsula, Livingston Island in the South Shetland Islands, Antarctica. The cove is entered south of Essex Point and north of Kardzhali Point.

The feature is "named after Ograzhden Mountain in southwestern Bulgaria."

== Location ==
Ograzhden Cove is centred at 62°34′50″S 61°10′50″W. British mapping in 1968, Spanish in 1993 and Bulgarian in 2009.

== Maps ==
- Península Byers, Isla Livingston. Mapa topográfico a escala 1:25000. Madrid: Servicio Geográfico del Ejército, 1992.
- L.L. Ivanov. Antarctica: Livingston Island and Greenwich, Robert, Snow and Smith Islands. Scale 1:120000 topographic map. Troyan: Manfred Wörner Foundation, 2009. ISBN 978-954-92032-6-4
- Antarctic Digital Database (ADD). Scale 1:250000 topographic map of Antarctica. Scientific Committee on Antarctic Research (SCAR). Since 1993, regularly upgraded and updated.
- L.L. Ivanov. Antarctica: Livingston Island and Smith Island. Scale 1:100000 topographic map. Manfred Wörner Foundation, 2017. ISBN 978-619-90008-3-0
