= Soyka Saddle =

Location of Clarence Island in the South Shetland Islands.

Soyka Saddle (Bulgarian: седловина Сойка, ‘Sedlovina Soyka’ \se-dlo-vi-'na 'soy-ka\) is the ice-covered saddle of elevation 1250 m connecting Ravelin Ridge and Urda Ridge on Clarence Island in the South Shetland Islands, Antarctica. It is situated between Mount Llana on the southwest and Jerez Peak on the north-northeast, and surmounts Highton Glacier to the east.

The saddle is named after the settlement of Soyka in Southern Bulgaria.

== Location ==
Soyka Saddle is located at 61°14′24″S 54°06′45″W, which is 4.6 km east-northeast of Vaglen Point, 6.07 km south-southeast of Humble Point and 4.45 km west-northwest of Lebed Point. British mapping in 1972 and 2009.

== Maps ==
- British Antarctic Territory. Scale 1:200000 topographic map. DOS 610 Series, Sheet W 61 54. Directorate of Overseas Surveys, Tolworth, UK, 1972.
- South Shetland Islands: Elephant, Clarence and Gibbs Islands. Scale 1:220000 topographic map. UK Antarctic Place-names Committee, 2009.
- Antarctic Digital Database (ADD). Scale 1:250000 topographic map of Antarctica. Scientific Committee on Antarctic Research (SCAR). Since 1993, regularly upgraded and updated.
