= Diomedes Lake =

Antarctic lake

- Location within South Shetland Islands
- Location: Livingston Island, Antarctica
- Coordinates: 62°36′07″S 61°06′40″W
- Lake type: Glacial lake
- Max. length: 480 metres (1,570 ft)
- Max. width: 112 metres (367 ft)
- Surface area: 4.55 hectares (11.2 acres)

Map of Antarctic Specially Protected Area ASPA 126 Byers Peninsula on Livingston Island

Map of Livingston, Greenwich, Robert, Snow and Smith Islands

Diomedes Lake (Bulgarian: езеро Диомед, romanized: ezero Diomed, IPA: [ˈɛzɛro dioˈmɛt]) is the trapezoidal lake 480 m long in southeast-northwest direction and 112 m wide near the west extremity of Robbery Beaches on Byers Peninsula, Livingston Island in the South Shetland Islands, Antarctica. It has a surface area of 4.55 ha, and is separated from the waters of Barclay Bay by a 16 to 40 m wide strip of land, and surmounted by Penca Hill on the south and Enrique Hill on the northwest. The lake and its vicinity lie in a restricted zone of scientific importance to Antarctic microbiology, part of the Antarctic Specially Protected Area Byers Peninsula. The area was visited by early 19th century sealers.

The feature is named after the mythical king Diomedes of Thrace.

== Location ==
Diomedes Lake is centred at 62°36′07″S 61°06′40″W which is 4.67 km southeast of Essex Point and 1.8 km west-northwest of Varadero Point. Detailed Spanish mapping in 1992, and Bulgarian mapping of the area in 2009 and 2017.

== Maps ==
- Península Byers, Isla Livingston. Mapa topográfico a escala 1:25000. Madrid: Servicio Geográfico del Ejército, 1992
- L. Ivanov. Antarctica: Livingston Island and Greenwich, Robert, Snow and Smith Islands. Scale 1:120000 topographic map. Troyan: Manfred Wörner Foundation, 2010. ISBN 978-954-92032-9-5 (First edition 2009. ISBN 978-954-92032-6-4)
- L. Ivanov. Antarctica: Livingston Island and Smith Island. Scale 1:100000 topographic map. Manfred Wörner Foundation, 2017. ISBN 978-619-90008-3-0
- Antarctic Digital Database (ADD). Scale 1:250000 topographic map of Antarctica. Scientific Committee on Antarctic Research (SCAR). Since 1993, regularly upgraded and updated

== See also ==
- Antarctic lakes
- Livingston Island
