= Jerez Peak =

Mountain in Antarctica

Location of Clarence Island in the South Shetland Islands.

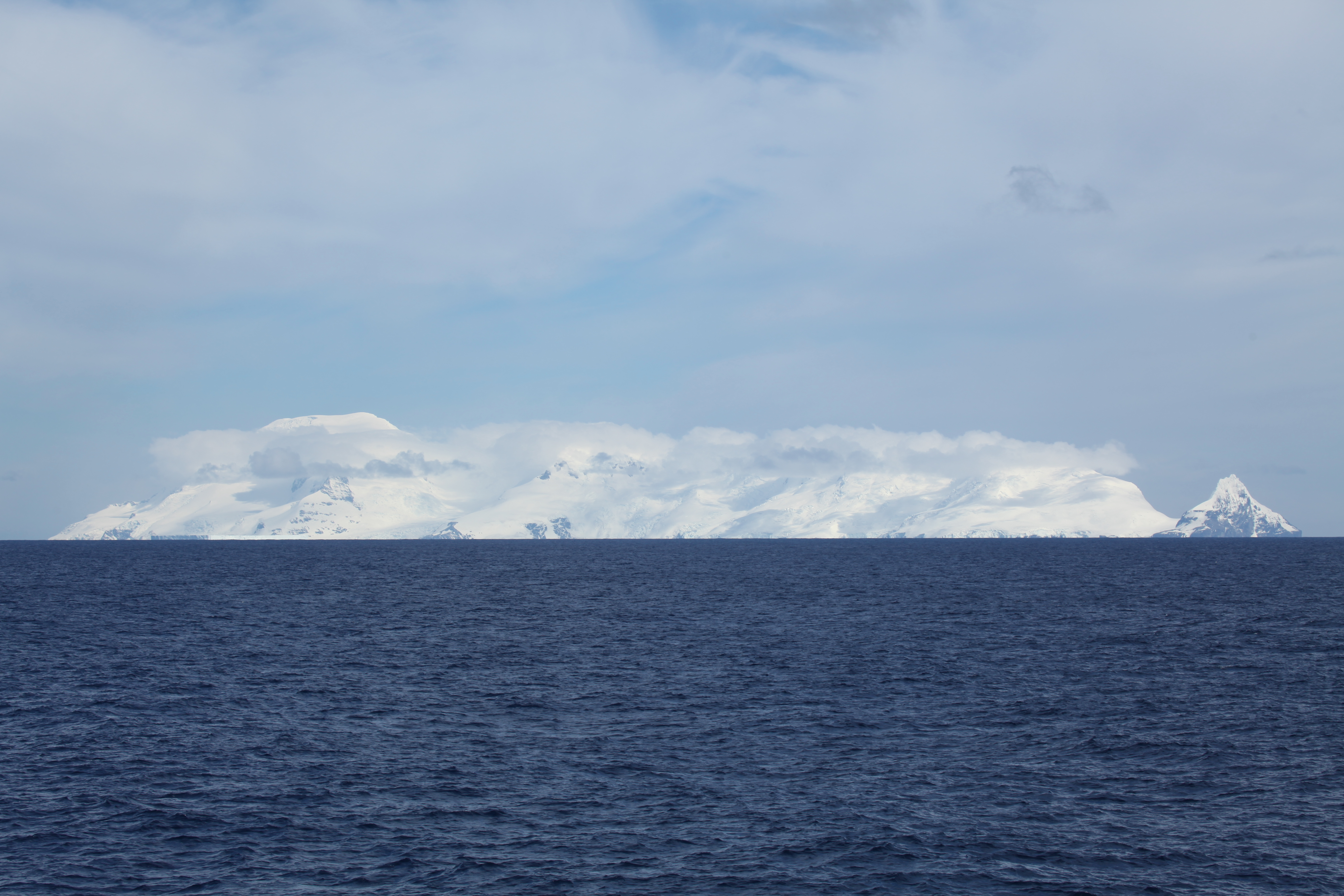
Clarence Island seen from northeast with Cape Bowles on the left and Cape Lloyd on the right; Jerez Peak is in the centre, clouded.

Jerez Peak (Bulgarian: връх Херес, romanized: vrah Heres, IPA: [ˈvrɤx ˈxɛrɛs]) is the ice-covered peak rising to 1400 m at the south extremity of Ravelin Ridge on Clarence Island in the South Shetland Islands, Antarctica. It is connected to Mount Llana by Soyka Saddle, and surmounts Treskavets Glacier to the northeast and Highton Glacier to the southeast.

The peak is named after the Spanish mariner Gregorio Jerez who made the second sighting of Roché Island (South Georgia, named by him Isla San Pedro) in 1756.

== Location ==
Jerez Peak is located at 61°13′47″S 54°06′21″W, which is 2 km north-northeast of Mount Llana and 5 km south of Humble Point. British mapping in 1972 and 2009.

== Maps ==
- British Antarctic Territory. Scale 1:200000 topographic map. DOS 610 Series, Sheet W 61 54. Directorate of Overseas Surveys, Tolworth, UK, 1972.
- South Shetland Islands: Elephant, Clarence and Gibbs Islands. Scale 1:220000 topographic map. UK Antarctic Place-names Committee, 2009.
- Antarctic Digital Database (ADD). Scale 1:250000 topographic map of Antarctica. Scientific Committee on Antarctic Research (SCAR). Since 1993, regularly upgraded and updated.
