= Penca Hill =

Hill in Antarctica

Location of Byers Peninsula on Livingston Island in the South Shetland Islands

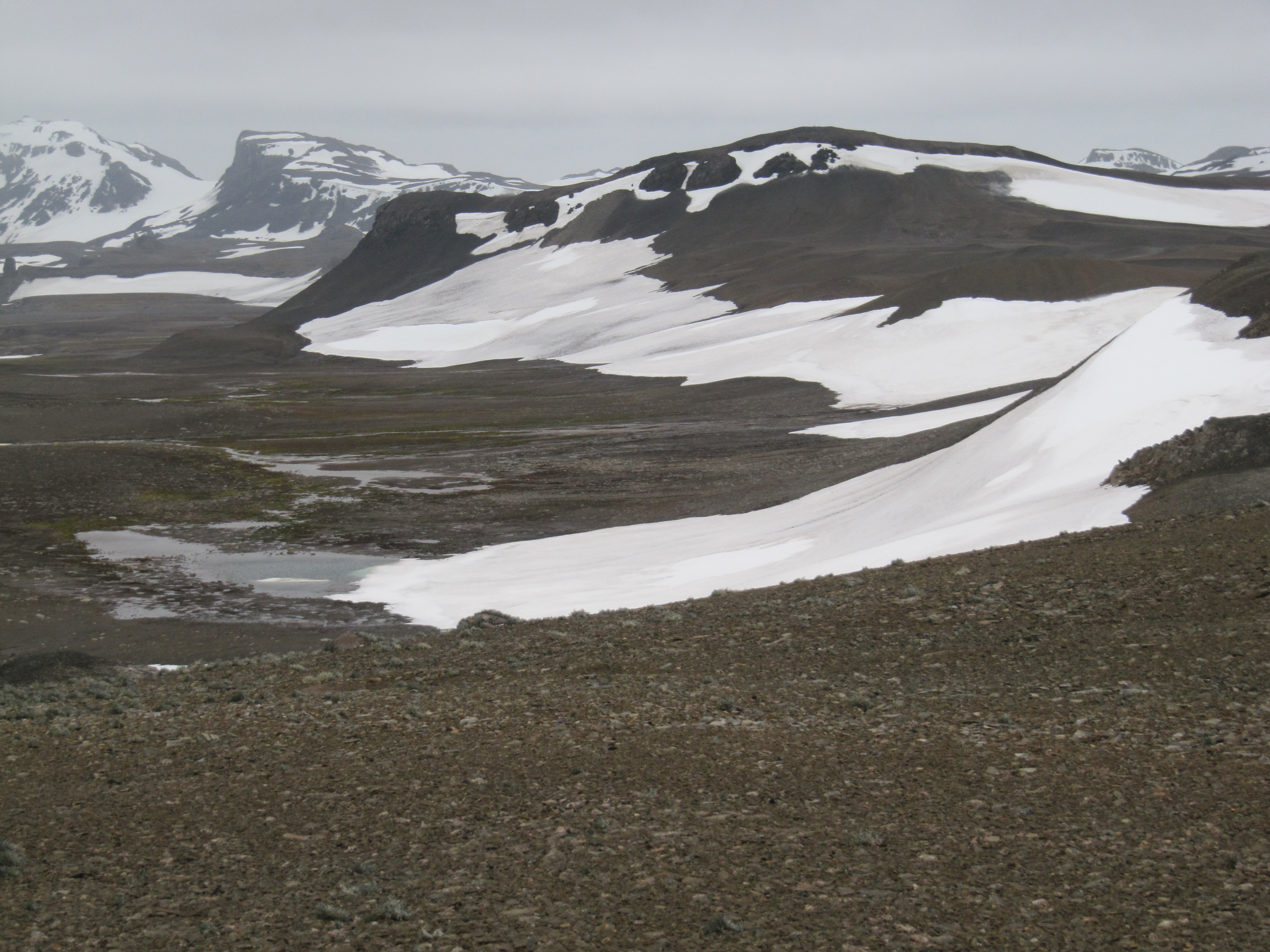
Dospey Heights on Ray Promontory from near Midge Lake on Byers Peninsula in Livingston Island, with Start Hill and Dulo Hill in the left background and Penca Hill in the right background

Topographic map of Byers Peninsula featuring Antarctic Specially Protected Area ASPA 126 and its two restricted zones

Topographic map of Livingston Island, Greenwich, Robert, Snow and Smith Islands

Penca Hill is a rocky hill rising to 217 m in Dospey Heights on Byers Peninsula, Livingston Island in the South Shetland Islands, Antarctica. It surmounts Diomedes Lake on the north.

The feature is part of the Antarctic Specially Protected Area ASPA 126 Byers Peninsula, situated in one of its restricted zones.

The feature is descriptively named, the Spanish penca referring to a fleshy leaf or joint of a plant.

== Location ==
Penca Hill is located at 62°36′04.9″S 61°07′23.2″W which is 2.77 km east-southeast of Start Hill, 2.28 km east-southeast of Dulo Hill, 1.93 km southeast of Battenberg Hill, 2.15 km northwest of Varadero Hill and 4.36 km north-northwest of Chester Cone (Chilean mapping in 1971, detailed Spanish mapping in 1992, and Bulgarian mapping in 2009).

== Maps ==
- Península Byers, Isla Livingston. Mapa topográfico a escala 1:25000. Madrid: Servicio Geográfico del Ejército, 1992.
- L.L. Ivanov. Antarctica: Livingston Island and Greenwich, Robert, Snow and Smith Islands. Scale 1:120000 topographic map. Troyan: Manfred Wörner Foundation, 2009. ISBN 978-954-92032-6-4
