= Richards Cove =

Location of Byers Peninsula, Livingston Island in the South Shetland Islands.

Topographic map of Livingston Island and Smith Island.

Richards Cove is the 450 m wide cove indenting for 550 m the north coast of Ray Promontory, Byers Peninsula, Livingston Island in the South Shetland Islands, Antarctica, entered east of Aglen Point and west of Voyteh Point. The area was visited by early 19th century sealers.

The cove is named after Captain John Richards, of the British sealing vessel George that operated in the South Shetland Islands in 1820–21, mainly from nearby Rugged Island.

== Location ==
Richards Cove is located at 62°34′49″S 61°08′55″W. British mapping in 1968, Chilean in 1971, Argentine in 1980, Spanish in 1992, and Bulgarian in 2005 and 2009.

== Maps ==
- Península Byers, Isla Livingston. Mapa topográfico a escala 1:25000. Madrid: Servicio Geográfico del Ejército, 1992.
- L.L. Ivanov et al. Antarctica: Livingston Island and Greenwich Island, South Shetland Islands. Scale 1:100000 topographic map. Sofia: Antarctic Place-names Commission of Bulgaria, 2005.
- L.L. Ivanov. Antarctica: Livingston Island and Greenwich, Robert, Snow and Smith Islands. Scale 1:120000 topographic map. Troyan: Manfred Wörner Foundation, 2009. ISBN 978-954-92032-6-4
- Antarctic Digital Database (ADD). Scale 1:250000 topographic map of Antarctica. Scientific Committee on Antarctic Research (SCAR). Since 1993, regularly upgraded and updated.
- L.L. Ivanov. Antarctica: Livingston Island and Smith Island. Scale 1:100000 topographic map. Manfred Wörner Foundation, 2017. ISBN 978-619-90008-3-0
