= Mount Llana =

Mountain in Antarctica

Location of Clarence Island in the South Shetland Islands.

Mount Llana (Bulgarian: връх Ляна, romanized: vrah Lyana, IPA: [ˈvrɤx ˈʎanɐ]) is the ice-covered peak rising to 1300 m at the north extremity of Urda Ridge on Clarence Island in the South Shetland Islands, Antarctica. It is connected to Jerez Peak by Soyka Saddle, and surmounts Bersame Glacier to the west and Highton Glacier to the east.

The peak is named after the Spanish mariner José de la Llana who probably discovered Shag Rocks, South Georgia in 1762.

== Location ==
Mount Llana is located at 61°14′46″S 54°07′17″W, which is 3.68 km north of Mount Irving and 2 km south-southwest of Jerez Peak. British mapping in 1972 and 2009.

== Maps ==
- British Antarctic Territory. Scale 1:200000 topographic map. DOS 610 Series, Sheet W 61 54. Directorate of Overseas Surveys, Tolworth, UK, 1972.
- South Shetland Islands: Elephant, Clarence and Gibbs Islands. Scale 1:220000 topographic map. UK Antarctic Place-names Committee, 2009.
- Antarctic Digital Database (ADD). Scale 1:250000 topographic map of Antarctica. Scientific Committee on Antarctic Research (SCAR). Since 1993, regularly upgraded and updated.
