= Pettus Glacier =

Glacier in Antarctica

- Location within Antarctica
- Location: Trinity Peninsula
- Coordinates: 63°48′S 59°04′W
- Terminus: Gavin Ice Piedmont

Pettus Glacier (63°48′S 59°04′W) is a narrow deeply entrenched glacier 9 nautical miles (17 km; 10 mi) long, which flows north from Ebony Wall into Gavin Ice Piedmont between Poynter Hill and Tinsel Dome, Trinity Peninsula, Antarctica.

== Location ==
Trinity Peninsula, Antarctic Peninsula. Pettus Glacier towards south end

Pettus Glacier is in Graham Land in the Trinity Peninsula, which is the tip of the Antarctic Peninsula. The glacier flows north from Ebony Wall on the side of the Detroit Plateau to the Gavin Ice Piedmont, which lies to the south of Bone Bay and east of Charcot Bay. It passes Ivory Pinnacles, Poynter Col and Poynter Hill on its west side, and Aureole Hills and Tinsel Dome on its east side.

- Copernix satellite view

== Name ==
Pettus Glacier was named by the UK Antarctic Place-Names Committee (UK-APC) for Robert N. Pettus, an aircraft pilot with the Falkland Islands and Dependencies Aerial Survey Expedition (FIDASE), 1956–57.

== Western features ==
Features on the west (left) side of the glacier include, from south to north:

=== Ebony Wall ===
63°55′S 59°09′W. A dark, nearly vertical rock wall which rises about 400 metres (1,300 ft) high at the head of Pettus Glacier. The wall is about 2 nautical miles (3.7 km; 2.3 mi) long and forms a part of the west escarpment of Detroit Plateau near the base of Trinity Peninsula. Charted in 1948 by FIDS who applied the descriptive name.

=== Ohoden Col ===
63°50′31″S 59°11′35″W An ice-covered col of elevation 1,000 metres (3,300 ft) high extending 950 metres (3,120 ft), and linking Ivory Pinnacles to the north to Detroit Plateau to the south. Surmounting Pettus Glacier to the east. Named after the settlement of Ohoden in Northwestern Bulgaria.

=== Ivory Pinnacles ===
63°50′S 59°09′W. Two ice-covered peaks (1,120 metres (3,670 ft) high) on the west side of Pettus Glacier, 9 nautical miles (17 km; 10 mi) southeast of Cape Kjellman. Charted in 1948 by members of the Falkland Islands Dependencies Survey (FIDS) who applied the descriptive name.

=== Poynter Col ===
63°49′S 59°07′W. A snow-filled col, over 700 metres (2,300 ft) high, joining Poynter Hill and Ivory Pinnacles. The col is 9 nautical miles (17 km; 10 mi) east-southeast of Cape Kjellman. Charted by FIDS in 1948. Named by UK-APC from association with Poynter Hill.

=== Poynter Hill ===
63°46′S 59°06′W. A conspicuous hill, 825 metres (2,707 ft) high, standing 8 nautical miles (15 km; 9.2 mi) east-southeast of Cape Kjellman. Charted in 1948 by the FIDS. Named by the UK-APC (1950) after Mr. Poynter, Master's Mate, who accompanied Edward Bransfield on the brig Williams in January 1820 when explorations were made in the South Shetland Islands and Bransfield Strait.

=== Gorublyane Knoll ===
63°45′37″S 59°09′21″W A hill rising to 745 metres (2,444 ft) high at the base of Belitsa Peninsula. Situated 3.9 kilometres (2.4 mi) north of Poynter Hill and 9.6 kilometres (6.0 mi) south by east of Notter Point. Overlooking Gavin Ice Piedmont to the north and east. Named after the settlement of Gorublyane in Western Bulgaria, now part of the city of Sofia.

== Eastern features ==
Features on the east (right) side of the glacier include, from south to north:

=== Golesh Bluff ===
63°49′21″S 58°52′42″W An ihe ice-covered bluff rising to 1,426 metres (4,678 ft) high on the north side of Detroit Plateau. Situated 6.37 kilometres (3.96 mi) south-southeast of Aureole Hills. Precipitous west slopes surmounting a tributary glacier that flows northwestwards into Pettus Glacier. Named after the settlement of Golesh in Northeastern Bulgaria.

=== Bendida Peak ===
63°48′17″S 58°53′36″W An ice-covered peak rising to 1,339 metres (4,393 ft) high in the north foothills of Detroit Plateau. Situated 2.11 kilometres (1.31 mi) north-northwest of Golesh Bluff and 4.27 kilometres (2.65 mi) south by east of Aureole Hills. Surmounting a tributary glacier to the west that flows northwestwards into Pettus Glacier. Named after the Thracian goddess Bendida.

=== Kokiche Col ===
63°46′24″S 58°53′56″W. An ice-covered col of elevation 875 metres (2,871 ft) extending 650 metres (2,130 ft) on Trinity Peninsula, and linking Aureole Hills to the northwest to Detroit Plateau to the southeast. Situated 3.5 kilometres (2.2 mi) north of Bendida Peak, 5 kilometres (3.1 mi) southb by east of Tinsel Dome and 7.79 kilometres (4.84 mi) southwest of Zlatolist Hill. Named after the settlement of Kokiche in Southern Bulgaria.

=== Aureole Hills ===
63°46′S 58°54′W. Two smooth, conical, ice-covered hills, the higher being 1,080 metres (3,540 ft) high, standing close west of the north end of Detroit Plateau. The descriptive name was given by FIDS following its survey of 1948.

== Sources ==
- Alberts, Fred G., ed. (1995), Geographic Names of the Antarctic (PDF) (2 ed.), United States Board on Geographic Names This article incorporates public domain material from websites or documents of the United States Board on Geographic Names.

REMA Explorer
The Reference Elevation Model of Antarctica (REMA) gives ice surface measurements of most of the continent. When a feature is ice-covered, the ice surface will differ from the underlying rock surface and will change over time. To see ice surface contours and elevation of a feature as of the last REMA update,
- Open the Antarctic REMA Explorer
- Enter the feature's coordinates in the box at the top left that says "Find address or place", then press enter
  The coordinates should be in DMS format, e.g. 65°05'03"S 64°01'02"W. If you only have degrees and minutes, you may not be able to locate the feature.
- Hover over the icons at the left of the screen
- Find "Hillshade" and click on that
  In the bottom right of the screen, set "Shading Factor" to 0 to get a clearer image
- Find "Contour" and click on that
  In the "Contour properties" box, select Contour Interval = 1m
  You can zoom in and out to see the ice surface contours of the feature and nearby features
- Find "Identify" and click on that
  Click the point where the contour lines seem to indicate the top of the feature
  The "Identify" box will appear to the top left. The Orthometric height is the elevation of the ice surface of the feature at this point.

- Antarctic REMA Explorer (Digital Elevation Models created by the Polar Geospatial Center from Maxar imagery), Polar Geospatial Center. University of Minnesota, 2019
- "Bendida Peak", Composite Gazetteer of Antarctica, Scientific Committee on Antarctic Research
- "Gorublyane Knoll", Composite Gazetteer of Antarctica, Scientific Committee on Antarctic Research
- Graham Land and South Shetland Islands, BAS: British Antarctic Survey, 2005
- "Golesh Bluff", Composite Gazetteer of Antarctica, Scientific Committee on Antarctic Research
- "Kokiche Col", Composite Gazetteer of Antarctica, Scientific Committee on Antarctic Research
- "Ohoden Col", Composite Gazetteer of Antarctica, Scientific Committee on Antarctic Research
- Trinity Peninsula (PDF) (Scale 1:250000 topographic map No. 5697), Institut für Angewandte Geodäsie and British Antarctic Survey, 1996, archived from the original (PDF) on 23 September 2015
