= Aslıgül Üğdül =

Turkish diplomat (born 1957)

Hatice Aslıgül Üğdül

Turkey Ambassador to Senegal
- In office 2010 – February 2012
- President: Abdullah Gül
- Preceded by: Ali Kaya Savut
- Succeeded by: Zeynep Sibel Algan

Turkey Ambassador to Slovakia
- Incumbent
- Assumed office November 2016
- President: Recep Tayyip Erdoğan
- Preceded by: Lebibe Gülhan Ulutekin

Personal details
- Born: Hatice Aslıgül İstinyeli; June 6, 1957 (age 68) Ankara, Turkey
- Spouse: Tunç Üğdül
- Children: 2
- Education: Public Administration
- Alma mater: TED Ankara College, Middle East Technical University, University of California, Berkeley
- Profession: Diplomat

Hatice Aslıgül Üğdül (born İstinyeli on June 6, 1957) is a Turkish female diplomat.

== Early years ==
Hatice Aslıgül İstinyeli was born in Ankara on June 6, 1957. After completing TED Ankara College in 1974, she studied Public Administration at the Middle East Technical University and graduated with honors in 1980. She later obtained a master's degree from the University of California, Berkeley in the United States. In 1984, she married Tunç Üğdül, also a diplomat. The couple has two children, daughter Meriç and son Cem.

== Diplomatic career ==
Üğdül entered the service of the Ministry of Foreign Affairs in 1982. She began working in the Cultural Relations Department, and served at various posts in the Ministry and at missions in many foreign countries such as Paris, France, and Thessaloniki, Greece. She was at the European Agency of High Technology for three years before she served as the Consul in Antwerp, Belgium. Her next foreign post was at the International Civil Aviation Organization in Montreal, Canada. She served also in the department for the European Union of the Prime Ministry. In 2005, she was appointed Deputy Permanent Representative to the United Nations and Minister-Counsellor at the United Nations Office at Geneva. Üğdül served as the first ever female Ambassador of Turkey in Africa to Senegal between 2010 and 2012. During this time, she represented her country in addition to Senegal also in Guinea, Guinea-Bissau, Ivory Coast, Cape Verde, Burkina Faso and The Gambia of West Africa. Returned home, she was appointed Counselor in the Ministry in 2012, and diplomacy advisor to the Minister of Family and Social Policy Fatma Şahin. In January 2014, she became Director General of the Department of Europe at the Ministry. Effective as of November 15, 2016, she was appointed Ambassador to Slovakia.
