= Villard Point =

Peninsula in the Southern Shetland Isles

Location of Byers Peninsula, Livingston Island in the South Shetland Islands

Topographic map of Antarctic Specially Protected Area ASPA 126 Byers Peninsula

Topographic map of Livingston Island and Smith Islands

Villard Point is a point projecting 500 m into Barclay Bay from Robbery Beaches on Byers Peninsula, Livingston Island in the South Shetland Islands, Antarctica and forming the east side of the entrance to Baba Tonka Cove and the west side of the entrance to Kukuzel Cove.

The point was named in 1971 by the Chilean Antarctic Expedition following geological work in the area, probably after a member of the expedition.

== Location ==
The point is located at 62°36′43.9″S 61°03′25.9″W which is 1.19 km east-southeast of Varadero Point and 1.16 km west-northwest of Lair Point (British mapping in 1968, Chilean mapping in 1971, detailed Spanish mapping in 1992, and Bulgarian mapping in 2005, 2009 and 2017).

== Maps ==
- Península Byers, Isla Livingston. Mapa topográfico a escala 1:25000. Madrid: Servicio Geográfico del Ejército, 1992.
- L.L. Ivanov et al. Antarctica: Livingston Island and Greenwich Island, South Shetland Islands. Scale 1:100000 topographic map. Sofia: Antarctic Place-names Commission of Bulgaria, 2005.
- L.L. Ivanov. Antarctica: Livingston Island and Greenwich, Robert, Snow and Smith Islands. Scale 1:120000 topographic map. Troyan: Manfred Wörner Foundation, 2009. ISBN 978-954-92032-6-4

== In fiction ==
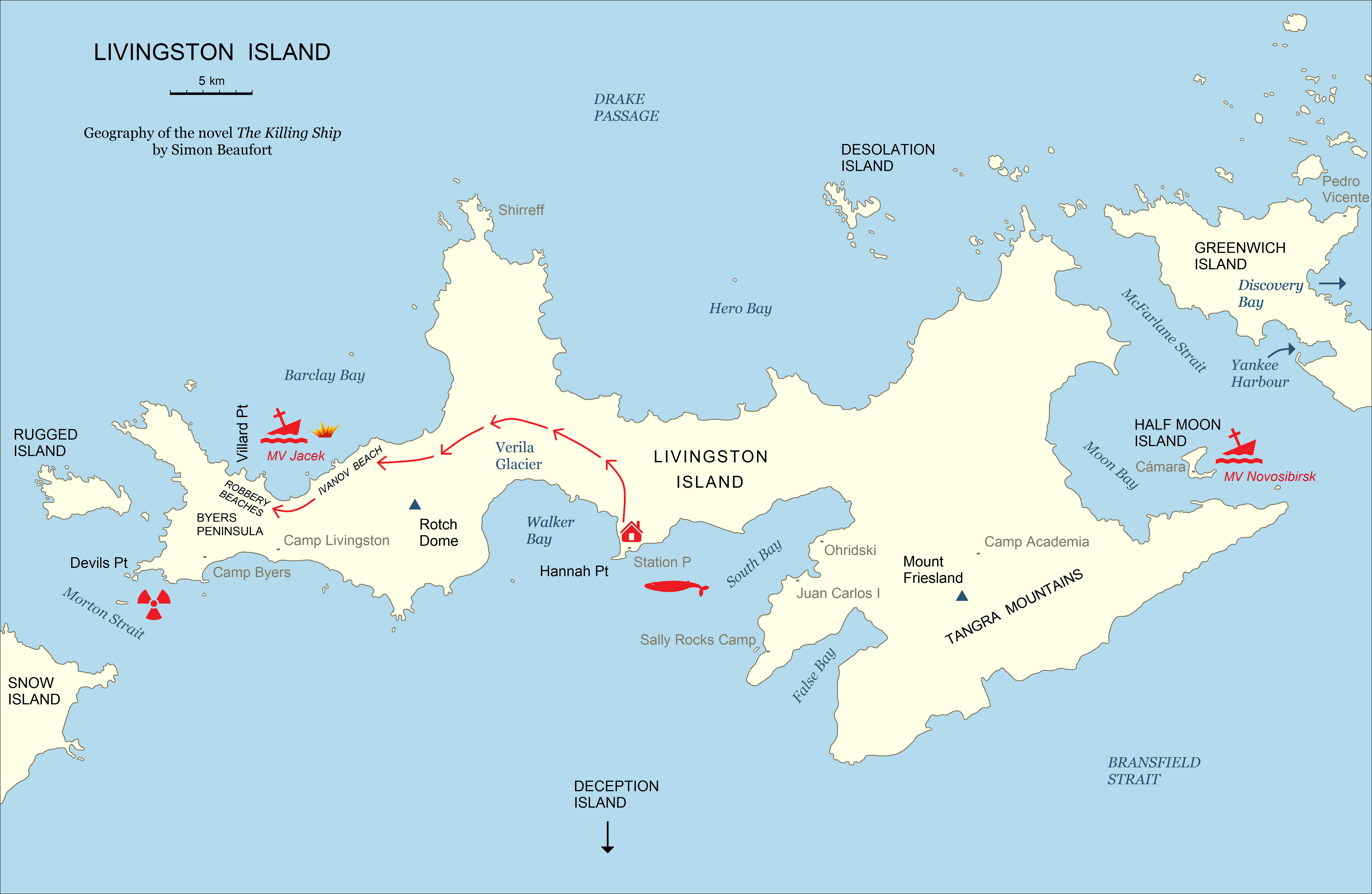
Geography of the thriller novel The Killing Ship by Simon Beaufort

Villard Point is part of the mise-en-scène in the Antarctica thriller novel The Killing Ship authored by Elizabeth Cruwys and Beau Riffenburgh under their joint alias Simon Beaufort in 2016, and is shown on a sketch map of Livingston Island illustrating the book.
