= Svishtov Cove =

Cove in the South Shetland Islands, Antarctica

Location of Byers Peninsula, Livingston Island in the South Shetland Islands.

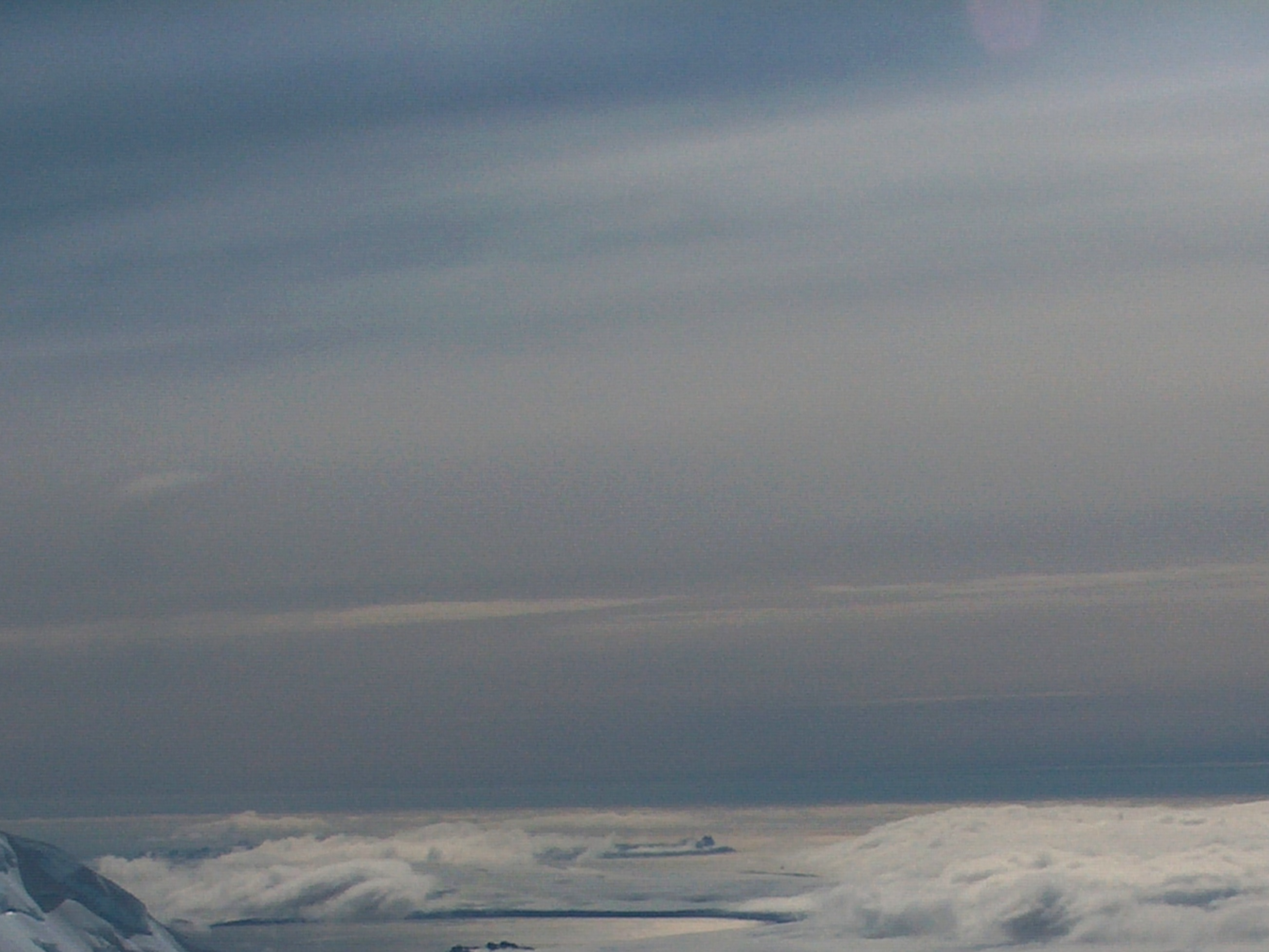
Svishtov Cove on the far side of Byers Peninsula in the background, from the west slope of Lyaskovets Peak.

Topographic map of Livingston Island and Smith Island

Svishtov Cove (Bulgarian: Свищовски залив, romanized: Svishtovski zaliv, IPA: [sviˈʃtɔfski ˈzalif]) is a 2.19 km wide cove indenting for 1.48 km the northwest extremity of Ray Promontory on Byers Peninsula, Livingston Island in the South Shetland Islands, Antarctica. it is entered southwest of Essex Point and northeast of Start Point.

== Location ==
The cove is located at 62°35′10″S 61°11′20″W (Detailed Spanish mapping in 1992, Bulgarian mapping in 2005 and 2009).

== See also ==
- Belene Cove
- Ograzhden Cove

== Maps ==
- Península Byers, Isla Livingston. Mapa topográfico a escala 1:25000. Madrid: Servicio Geográfico del Ejército, 1992.
- L.L. Ivanov et al. Antarctica: Livingston Island and Greenwich Island, South Shetland Islands. Scale 1:100000 topographic map. Sofia: Antarctic Place-names Commission of Bulgaria, 2005.
- L.L. Ivanov. Antarctica: Livingston Island and Greenwich, Robert, Snow and Smith Islands. Scale 1:120000 topographic map. Troyan: Manfred Wörner Foundation, 2010. ISBN 978-954-92032-9-5 (First edition 2009. ISBN 978-954-92032-6-4)
- Antarctic Digital Database (ADD). Scale 1:250000 topographic map of Antarctica. Scientific Committee on Antarctic Research (SCAR). Since 1993, regularly upgraded and updated.
- L.L. Ivanov. Antarctica: Livingston Island and Smith Island. Scale 1:100000 topographic map. Manfred Wörner Foundation, 2017. ISBN 978-619-90008-3-0
