= Kukuzel Cove =

Cove in the South Shetland Islands, Antarctica

Location of Byers Peninsula on Livingston Island in the South Shetland Islands.

Topographic map of Livingston Island

Kukuzel Cove (Bulgarian: залив Кукузел, romanized: zaliv Kukuzel, IPA: [ˈzalif kokoˈzɛɫ]) is the 1.18 km wide cove indenting for 620 m the north coast of Byers Peninsula between Lair Point and Villard Point on Livingston Island in the South Shetland Islands, Antarctica. The area was visited by early 19th century sealers.

The cove is “named after the byzantine music composer and singer St. John Koukouzelis (1280–1360).”

== Location ==
Kukuzel Cove is located at 62°36′57″S 61°02′50″W. British mapping in 1968, Spanish in 1993 and Bulgarian in 2009.

== Maps ==
- Península Byers, Isla Livingston. Mapa topográfico a escala 1:25000. Madrid: Servicio Geográfico del Ejército, 1992.
- L.L. Ivanov. Antarctica: Livingston Island and Greenwich, Robert, Snow and Smith Islands. Scale 1:120000 topographic map. Troyan: Manfred Wörner Foundation, 2009. ISBN 978-954-92032-6-4
- Antarctic Digital Database (ADD). Scale 1:250000 topographic map of Antarctica. Scientific Committee on Antarctic Research (SCAR). Since 1993, regularly upgraded and updated.
- L.L. Ivanov. Antarctica: Livingston Island and Smith Island. Scale 1:100000 topographic map. Manfred Wörner Foundation, 2017. ISBN 978-619-90008-3-0
