= Gaydarov Point =

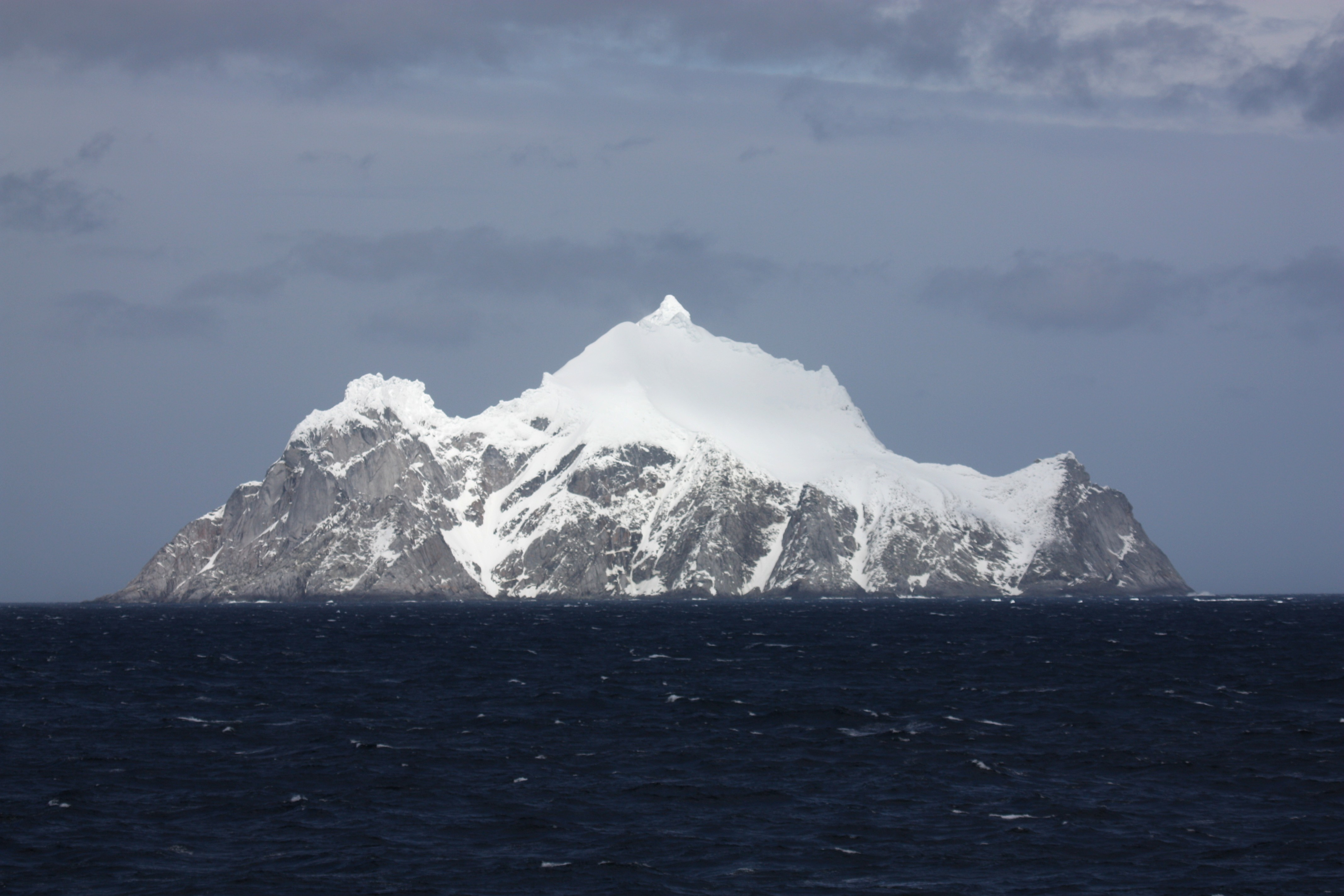
Cornwallis Island

Location of Cornwallis Island in the South Shetland Islands

Gaydarov Point (Bulgarian: Гайдаров нос, ‘Gaydarov Nos’ \gay-'da-rov 'nos\) is the rocky point forming the south extremity of Cornwallis Island in the South Shetland Islands, Antarctica. It is “named after Captain Kostadin Gaydarov (1933-2019), Director (1983-1986) of the Bulgarian company Ocean Fisheries – Burgas whose ships operated in the waters of South Georgia, Kerguelen, the South Orkney Islands, South Shetland Islands and Antarctic Peninsula from 1970 to the early 1990s. The Bulgarian fishermen, along with those of the Soviet Union, Poland and East Germany are the pioneers of modern Antarctic fishing industry.”

== Location ==
Gaydarov Point is located at 61°04′51.8″S 54°27′38″W, which is 10.5 km east-northeast of Cape Valentine on Elephant Island and 21.25 km northwest of Humble Point on Clarence Island. British mapping in 1822, 1972 and 2009.

== Maps ==
- Chart of South Shetland including Coronation Island, &c. from the exploration of the sloop Dove in the years 1821 and 1822 by George Powell Commander of the same. Scale ca. 1:200000. London: Laurie, 1822.
- British Antarctic Territory. Scale 1:200000 topographic map. DOS 610 Series, Sheet W 61 54. Directorate of Overseas Surveys. Tolworth, UK, 1972
- South Shetland Islands: Elephant, Clarence and Gibbs Islands. Scale 1:220000 topographic map. UK Antarctic Place-names Committee, 2009
- Antarctic Digital Database (ADD). Scale 1:250000 topographic map of Antarctica. Scientific Committee on Antarctic Research (SCAR). Since 1993, regularly upgraded and updated
