= Groma Rock =

Rock in Antarctica

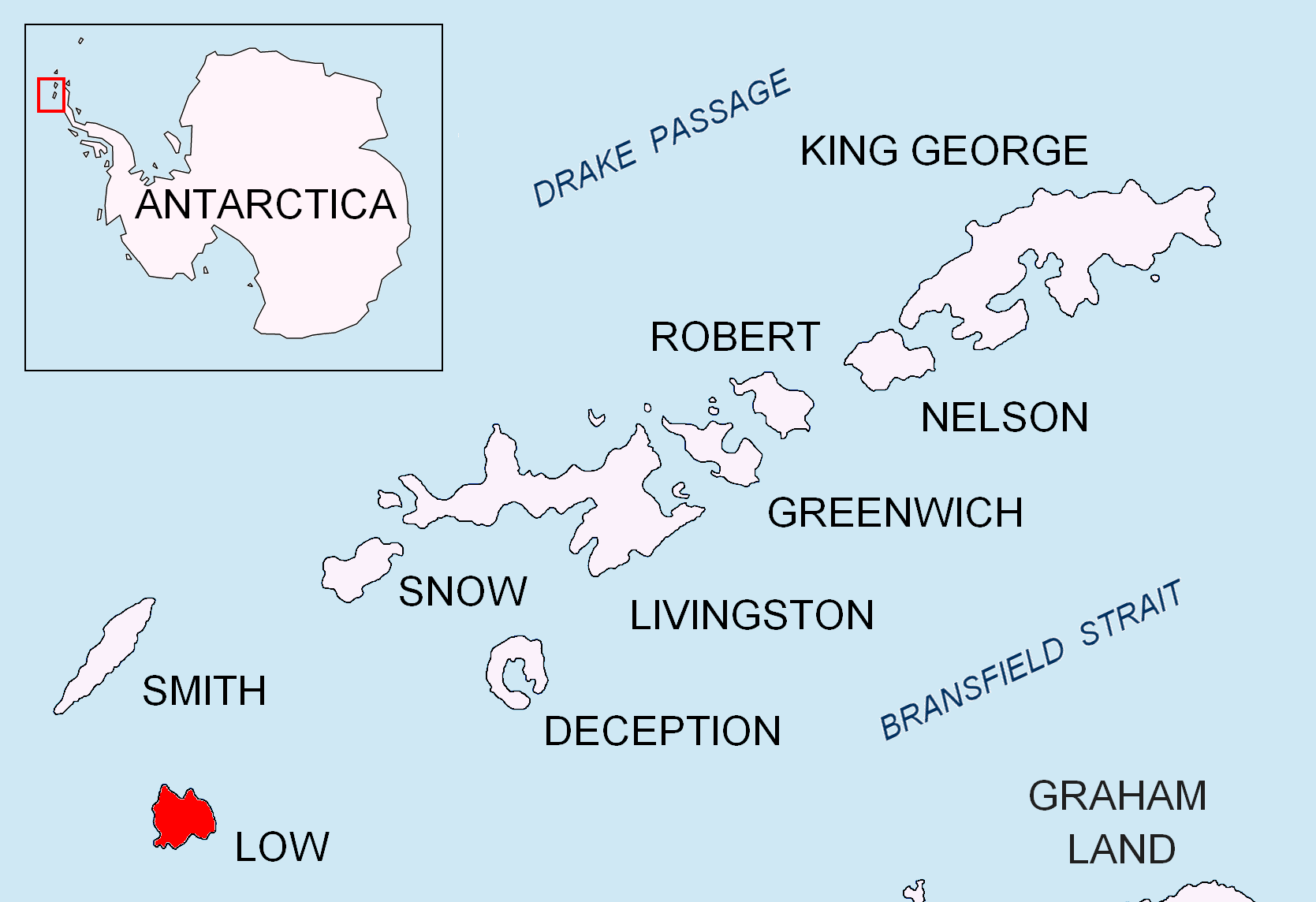
- Location of Low Island in the South Shetland Islands

- Location within Antarctica Location within South Shetland Islands

Geography
- Location: Antarctica
- Coordinates: 63°13′01.7″S 62°11′33″W
- Archipelago: South Shetland Islands
- Area: 0.1 ha (0.25 acres)
- Length: 45 m (148 ft)
- Width: 30 m (100 ft)

Administration
- Administered under the Antarctic Treaty

Demographics
- Population: uninhabited

Groma Rock (Bulgarian: скала Грома, romanized: skala Groma, IPA: [skɐˈla ˈgrɔmɐ]) is the 45 m long in south-north direction and 30 m wide rock off the northwest extremity of Low Island in the South Shetland Islands. Its surface area is 0.1 ha.

The feature is named after the ancient Roman surveying instrument groma, and in association with other names in the area deriving from the early development or use of geodetic instruments and methods.

== Location ==
Groma Rock lies in Osmar Strait at 63°13′01.7″S 62°11′33″W, which is 370 m north-northwest of Dioptra Island and 1.75 km north-northeast of Cape Wallace. British mapping in 2009.

== See also ==
- List of Antarctic and subantarctic islands

== Maps ==
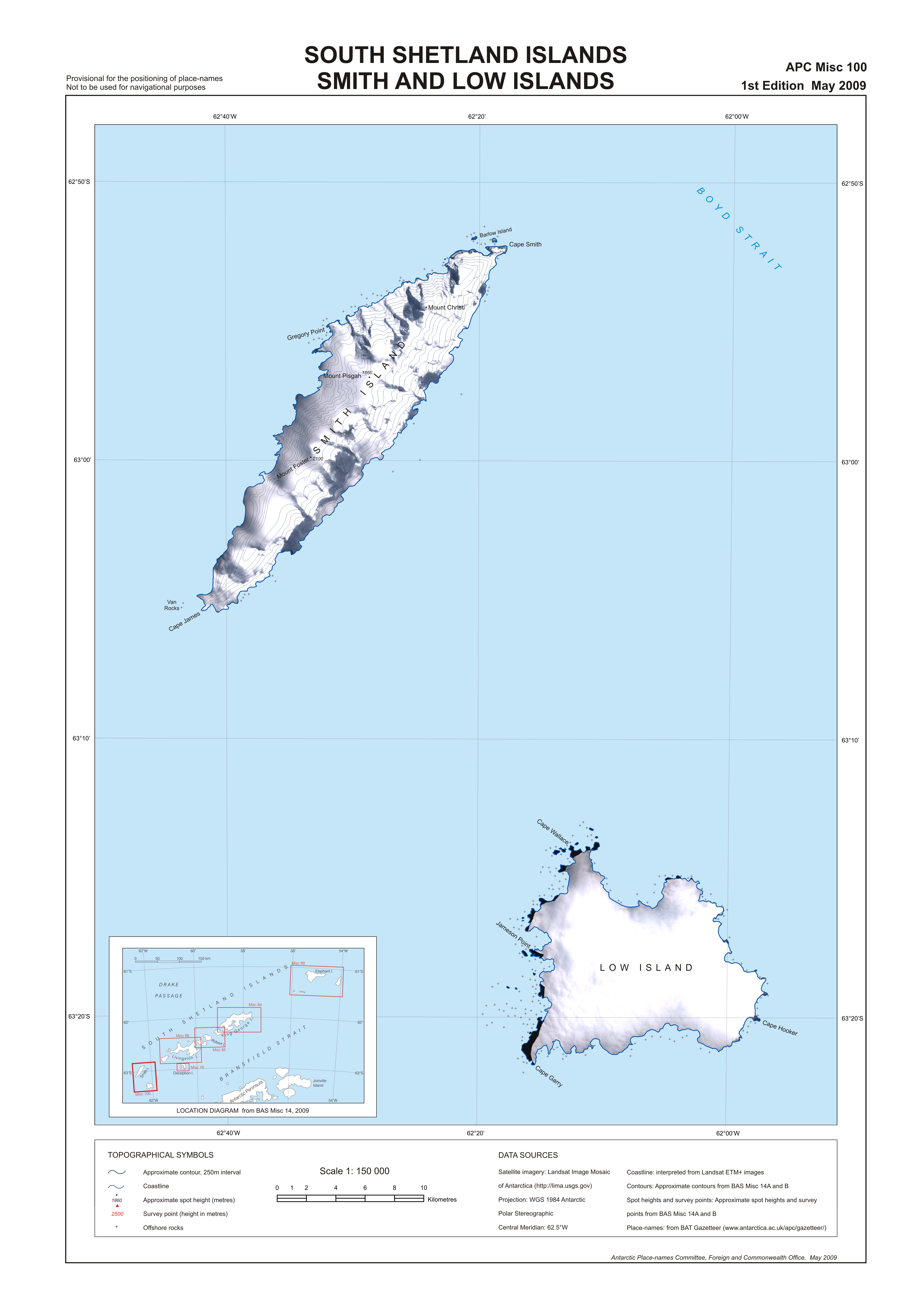
Map of Smith and Low Islands in the South Shetland Islands

- South Shetland Islands: Smith and Low Islands. Scale 1:150000 topographic map No. 13677. British Antarctic Survey, 2009
- Antarctic Digital Database (ADD). Scale 1:250000 topographic map of Antarctica. Scientific Committee on Antarctic Research (SCAR). Since 1993, regularly upgraded and updated
