= Voyteh Point =

Point in the South Shetland Islands, Antarctica

Location of Byers Peninsula on Livingston Island in the South Shetland Islands.

Topographic map of Byers Peninsula featuring Antarctic Specially Protected Area ASPA 126 and its two restricted zones

Topographic map of Livingston Island and Smith Island.

Voyteh Point (Bulgarian: нос Войтех, ‘Nos Voyteh’ \'nos 'voy-teh\) is the point forming the east side of the entrance to Richards Cove on the north coast of Ray Promontory in the northwestern part of Byers Peninsula on Livingston Island in the South Shetland Islands, Antarctica. It is surmounted by Sàbat Hill. The area was visited by early 19th century sealers.

The feature is part of the Antarctic Specially Protected Area ASPA 126 Byers Peninsula, situated in one of its restricted zones.

The point is named after Georgi Voyteh, Kavhan (hereditary viceroy function) under Czar Konstantin-Petar of Bulgaria (11th Century AD).

== Location ==
Voyteh Point is located at 62°34′45.7″S 61°08′43″W, which is 2.05 km east of Essex Point and 4.69 km northwest of Varadero Point (British mapping in 1968, Spanish in 1992 and Bulgarian in 2005 and 2009).

== Maps ==
- Península Byers, Isla Livingston. Mapa topográfico a escala 1:25000. Madrid: Servicio Geográfico del Ejército, 1992.
- L.L. Ivanov et al. Antarctica: Livingston Island and Greenwich Island, South Shetland Islands. Scale 1:100000 topographic map. Sofia: Antarctic Place-names Commission of Bulgaria, 2005.
- L.L. Ivanov. Antarctica: Livingston Island and Greenwich, Robert, Snow and Smith Islands. Scale 1:120000 topographic map. Troyan: Manfred Wörner Foundation, 2009. ISBN 978-954-92032-6-4
- Antarctic Digital Database (ADD). Scale 1:250000 topographic map of Antarctica. Scientific Committee on Antarctic Research (SCAR). Since 1993, regularly upgraded and updated.
- L.L. Ivanov. Antarctica: Livingston Island and Smith Island. Scale 1:100000 topographic map. Manfred Wörner Foundation, 2017. ISBN 978-619-90008-3-0
