= Dulo Hill =

Mountain in Antarctica

Location of Byers Peninsula on Livingston Island in the South Shetland Islands

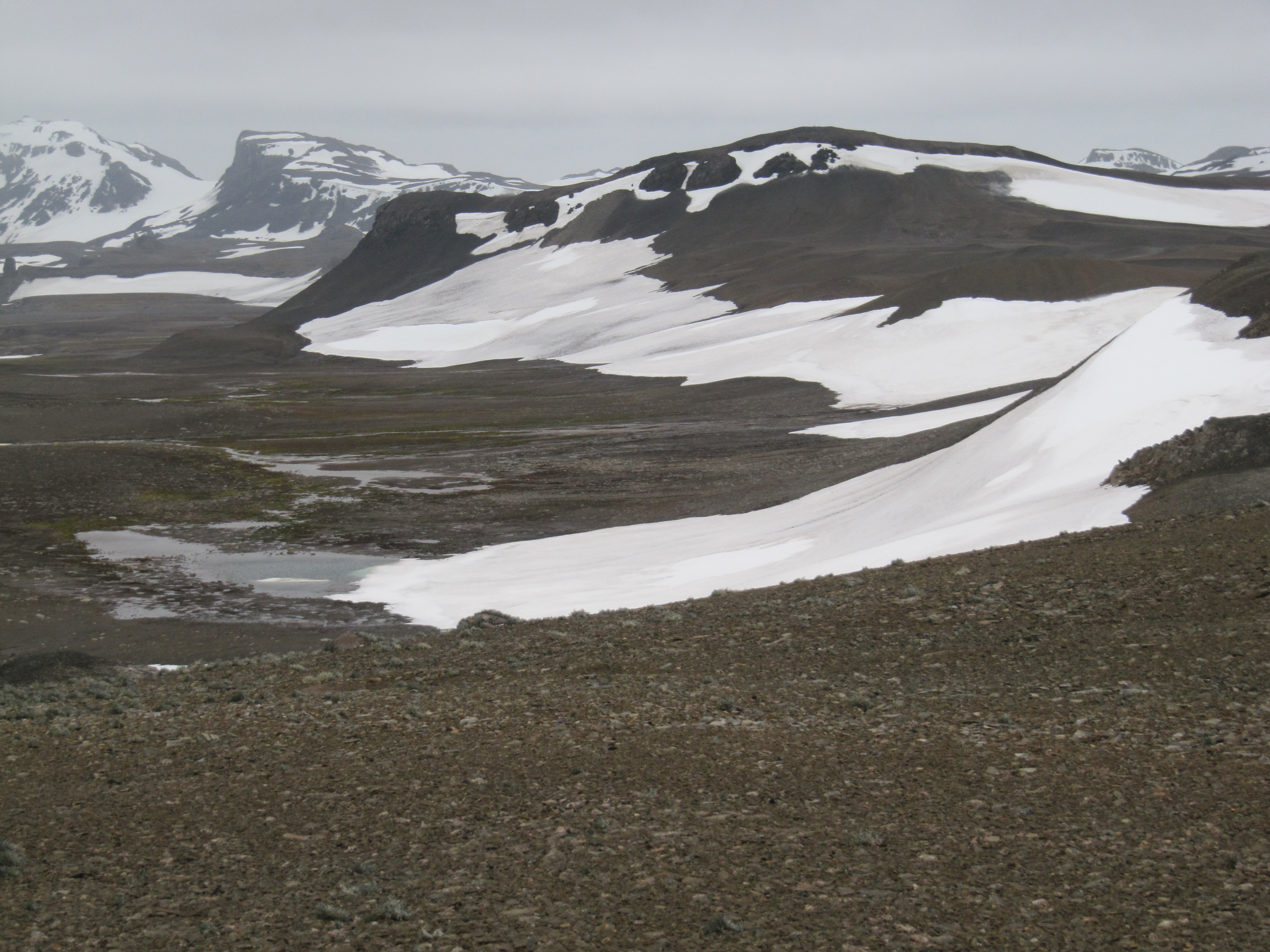
Dospey Heights on Ray Promontory from near Midge Lake on Byers Peninsula in Livingston Island, with Start Hill and Dulo Hill in the left background and Penca Hill in the right background

Topographic map of Byers Peninsula featuring Antarctic Specially Protected Area ASPA 126 and its two restricted zones

Topographic map of Livingston Island, Greenwich, Robert, Snow and Smith Islands

Dulo Hill (Bulgarian: хълм Дуло, ‘Halm Dulo’ \'h&lm 'du-lo\) is a rocky hill rising to 210 m (690 ft) in Dospey Heights on Byers Peninsula of Livingston Island in the South Shetland Islands, Antarctica. It overlooks President Beaches to the south.

The feature is part of the Antarctic Specially Protected Area ASPA 126 Byers Peninsula, situated in one of its restricted zones.

The hill is named after the Bulgarian ruling dynasty of Dulo (7th–10th century).

== Location ==
Dulo Hill is located at 62°36′05.2″S 61°09′22.5″W which is 1.2 km (0.75 mi) southeast of Start Hill, 2.52 km (1.57 mi) south of Voyteh Point and 2.49 km (1.55 mi) west-northwest of Penca Hill (British mapping in 1968, Spanish in 1992, and Bulgarian in 2005 and 2009).

== Maps ==
- Península Byers, Isla Livingston. Mapa topográfico a escala 1:25000. Madrid: Servicio Geográfico del Ejército, 1992.
- L.L. Ivanov et al. Antarctica: Livingston Island and Greenwich Island, South Shetland Islands. Scale 1:100000 topographic map. Sofia: Antarctic Place-names Commission of Bulgaria, 2005.
- L.L. Ivanov. Antarctica: Livingston Island and Greenwich, Robert, Snow and Smith Islands. Scale 1:120000 topographic map. Troyan: Manfred Wörner Foundation, 2009. ISBN 978-954-92032-6-4
