= Prince Charles Strait =

Strait in Antarctica

Coordinates: 61°5′S 54°35′W

Prince Charles Strait is a strait 9 km (5.6 mi) wide between Cornwallis and Elephant Islands, in the South Shetland Islands of Antarctica. This strait was known to sealers as early as 1821, but the first record of its navigation was in 1839 by the brig Porpoise of the United States Exploring Expedition squadron under Wilkes. Soundings of the strait were made by the vessel John Biscoe and the frigate HMS Sparrow in December 1948. It was named for King Charles III, son of Queen Elizabeth II of the United Kingdom.
