= Dospey Heights =

Landmasses in Antarctica

Location of Byers Peninsula on Livingston Island in the South Shetland Islands

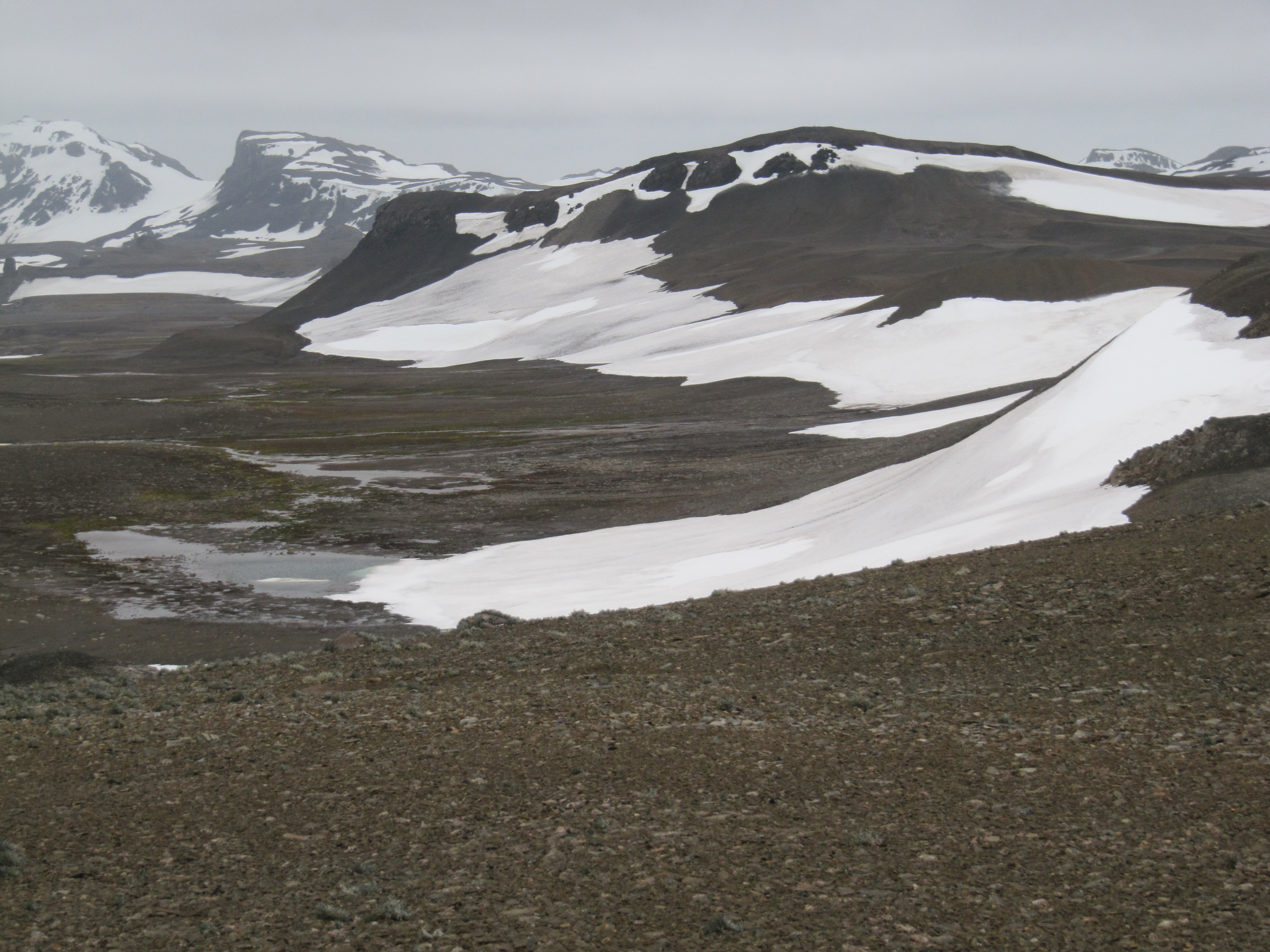
Dospey Heights on Ray Promontory from near Midge Lake on Byers Peninsula in Livingston Island, with Start Hill and Dulo Hill in the left background and Penca Hill in the right background

Topographic map of Byers Peninsula featuring Antarctic Specially Protected Area ASPA 126 and its two restricted zones

Topographic map of Livingston Island

Dospey Heights (Bulgarian: Доспейски възвишения, romanized: Dospeyski Vazvisheniya, IPA: [do'spɛjski vɤzvi'ʃɛnijɐ]) are the ice-free heights on Ray Promontory in the northwestern part of Byers Peninsula on Livingston Island in the South Shetland Islands, Antarctica. Extending 6 km southeastwards from Essex Point and Start Point, and 2.6 km wide. Rising to 265 m at Start Hill.

The feature is part of the Antarctic Specially Protected Area ASPA 126 Byers Peninsula, and is situated in one of its two restricted zones.

The heights are named after the settlement of Dospey in Rila Mountain, southwestern Bulgaria.

== Location ==
Dospey Heights are centred at 62°35′50″S 61°08′25″W. British mapping in 1968, Spanish in 1991 and 1993 and Bulgarian in 2005 and 2009.

== Maps ==
- Península Byers, Isla Livingston. Mapa topográfico a escala 1:25000. Madrid: Servicio Geográfico del Ejército, 1992. (Map image on p. 55 of the linked study)
- L.L. Ivanov et al. Antarctica: Livingston Island and Greenwich Island, South Shetland Islands. Scale 1:100000 topographic map. Sofia: Antarctic Place-names Commission of Bulgaria, 2005.
- L.L. Ivanov. Antarctica: Livingston Island and Greenwich, Robert, Snow and Smith Islands. Scale 1:120000 topographic map. Troyan: Manfred Wörner Foundation, 2010. ISBN 978-954-92032-9-5 (First edition 2009. ISBN 978-954-92032-6-4)
- South Shetland Islands: Livingston Island, Byers Peninsula. Scale 1:50000 satellite map. UK Antarctic Place-names Committee, 2010.
- Antarctic Digital Database (ADD). Scale 1:250000 topographic map of Antarctica. Scientific Committee on Antarctic Research (SCAR). Since 1993, regularly updated.
- L.L. Ivanov. Antarctica: Livingston Island and Smith Island. Scale 1:100000 topographic map. Manfred Wörner Foundation, 2017. ISBN 978-619-90008-3-0
