= Baba Tonka Cove =

Location of Byers Peninsula on Livingston Island in the South Shetland Islands.

Topographic map of Livingston Island, Greenwich, Robert, Snow and Smith Islands.

Baba Tonka Cove (Bulgarian: залив Баба Тонка, romanized: zaliv Baba Tonka, IPA: [ˈzaliv ˈbabɐ ˈtɔŋkɐ]) is the 1.1 km wide cove indenting for 750 m the north coast of Byers Peninsula between Villard Point and Varadero Point on Livingston Island in the South Shetland Islands, Antarctica. The area was visited by early 19th century sealers.

The cove is named after the Bulgarian revolutionary and national hero Tonka Obretenova (1812–1893), known as Baba Tonka ("Grandma Tonka").

== Location ==
Baba Tonka Cove is located at 62°36′45″S 61°04′13″W. British mapping in 1968, Spanish in 1993 and Bulgarian in 2009.

== Map ==
- L.L. Ivanov. Antarctica: Livingston Island and Greenwich, Robert, Snow and Smith Islands. Scale 1:120000 topographic map. Troyan: Manfred Wörner Foundation, 2009. ISBN 978-954-92032-6-4
