= Aglen, Bulgaria =

Coordinates: 43.2015°N 24.3174°E

Aglen (Bulgarian: Ъглен [ɐˈɡlɛn]) is a village in Lukovit Municipality, Lovech Province, in northern Bulgaria.

The village is situated on the River Vit, 40 km from the cities of Pleven and Lovech.

In the vicinity of the village there are 20 limestone caves.

Aglen Point in Antarctica is named after the village.

It is the only Bulgarian village starting with the letter Ъ.
