= Dañobeitia Crag =

Location of Livingston Island in the South Shetland Islands.

Topographic map of Livingston Island and Smith Island.

Dañobeitia Crag (Bulgarian: хълм Даньобеития, ‘Halm Dañobeitia’ \'h&lm da-nyo-be-i-'ti-ya\) is the sharp rocky hill rising to 205 m on the north coast of Livingston Island in the South Shetland Islands, Antarctica. It is surmounting Siddins Point, formed by an offshoot of the hill, Hero Bay to the north and its parts Vasilev Bay to the east and Maleshevo Cove to the southwest.

The feature is named after Juan José Dañobeitia Canales, manager of the Spanish Antarctic programme, for his support for the Bulgarian Antarctic campaigns.

== Location ==
Dañobeitia Crag is located at 62°32′57.6″S 60°25′48″W, which is 1.8 km northwest of the summit of Teres Ridge. British mapping in 1968, Spanish in 1991, and Bulgarian in 2005 and 2009.

== Maps ==
- L.L. Ivanov et al. Antarctica: Livingston Island and Greenwich Island, South Shetland Islands. Scale 1:100000 topographic map. Sofia: Antarctic Place-names Commission of Bulgaria, 2005.
- L.L. Ivanov. Antarctica: Livingston Island and Greenwich, Robert, Snow and Smith Islands. Scale 1:120000 topographic map. Troyan: Manfred Wörner Foundation, 2009. ISBN 978-954-92032-6-4
- Antarctic Digital Database (ADD). Scale 1:250000 topographic map of Antarctica. Scientific Committee on Antarctic Research (SCAR). Since 1993, regularly upgraded and updated.
- L.L. Ivanov. Antarctica: Livingston Island and Smith Island. Scale 1:100000 topographic map. Manfred Wörner Foundation, 2017. ISBN 978-619-90008-3-0
