= Zeynep Sibel Algan =

Turkish female diplomat

Turkey Ambassador to Senegal
- In office February 2012 – November 2014
- President: Abdullah Gül
- Preceded by: Aslıgül Üğdül
- Succeeded by: Nilgün Erdem Arı

Turkey Ambassador to The Netherlands
- President: Recep Tayyip Erdoğan

Personal details
- Born: September 25, 1955 (age 70) Istanbul, Turkey
- Spouse: Akın Algan
- Children: 1
- Education: Political science
- Alma mater: Galatasaray High School; Faculty of Political Science, Ankara University
- Profession: Diplomat

Zeynep Sibel Algan (born September 25, 1955) is a Turkish female diplomat.

Zeynep Sibel Algan was born in Istanbul, Turkey on September 25, 1955. She is married to Akın Algan, also a diplomat and ambassador. The couple has one child.

Algan's diplomatic missions were in France as consul in Paris and general consul in Strasbourg until June 2012.

Algan was appointed Ambassador of Turkey to Senegal in February 2012. She served in Dakar until November 2014.

In 2016, she was assigned to the Turkish Embassy in the Netherlands as a substitute. Currently, she serves as ambassador in The Hague.
