= Varadero Point =

Location of Byers Peninsula, Livingston Island in the South Shetland Islands

Topographic map of Antarctic Specially Protected Area ASPA 126 Byers Peninsula

Topographic map of Livingston Island, Greenwich, Robert, Snow and Smith Islands

Varadero Point is a point projecting 620 m into Barclay Bay from Robbery Beaches on Byers Peninsula, Livingston Island in the South Shetland Islands, Antarctica and forming the west side of the entrance to Baba Tonka Cove. Dominated by Varadero Hill (116 m).

The point is named descriptively ('Boathouse Point') from being an area where icebergs get stranded.

== Location ==
The point is located at 62°36′26.9″S 61°04′40.7″W which is 6.46 km southeast of Essex Point and 1.19 km west-northwest of Villard Point (British mapping in 1968, detailed Spanish mapping in 1992, and Bulgarian mapping in 2005 and 2009).

== Maps ==
- Península Byers, Isla Livingston. Mapa topográfico a escala 1:25000. Madrid: Servicio Geográfico del Ejército, 1992.
- L.L. Ivanov et al. Antarctica: Livingston Island and Greenwich Island, South Shetland Islands. Scale 1:100000 topographic map. Sofia: Antarctic Place-names Commission of Bulgaria, 2005.
- L.L. Ivanov. Antarctica: Livingston Island and Greenwich, Robert, Snow and Smith Islands. Scale 1:120000 topographic map. Troyan: Manfred Wörner Foundation, 2009. ISBN 978-954-92032-6-4
