= Algan, Kohgiluyeh and Boyer-Ahmad =

Algen الگن
- village
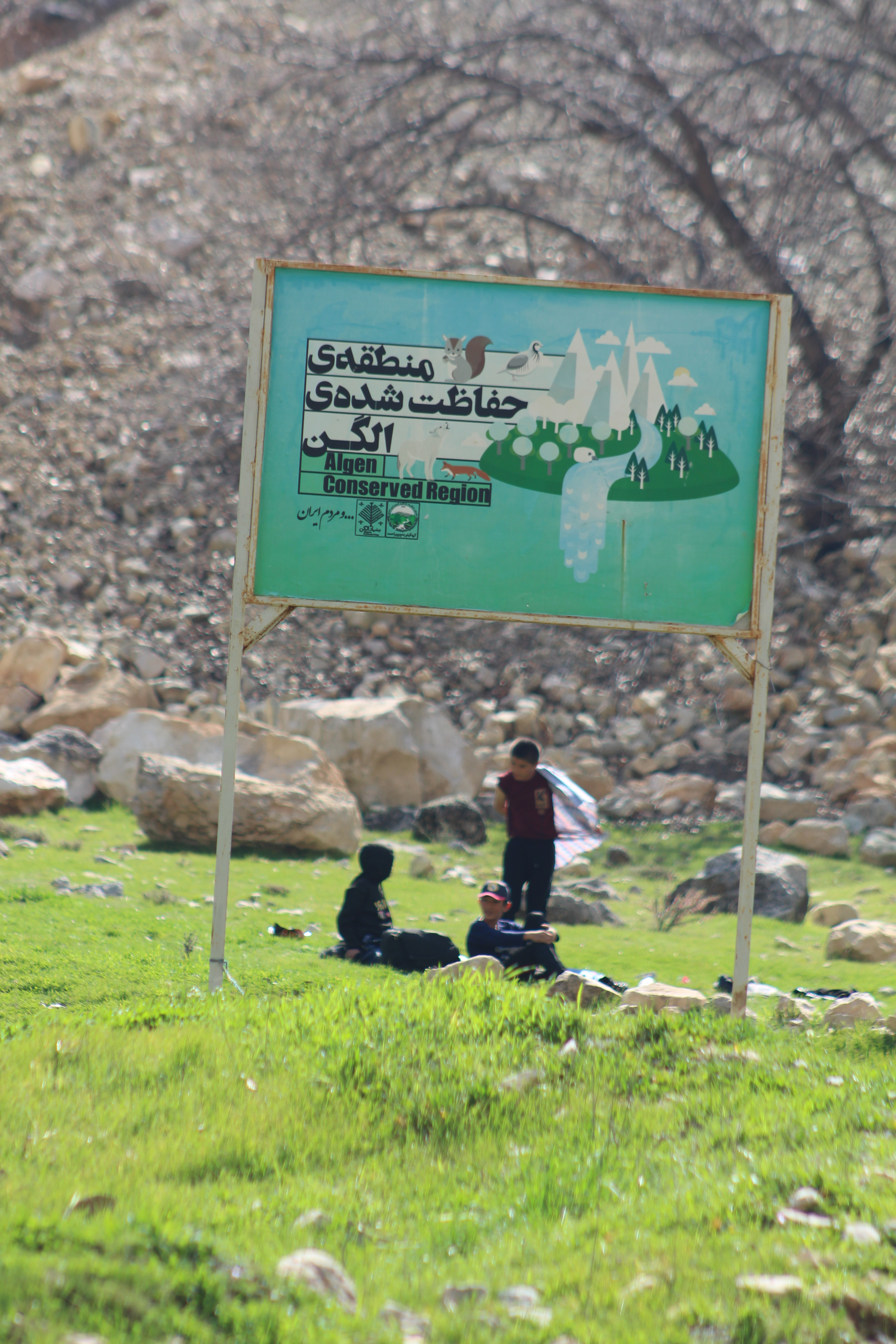

- Location within Iran
- Coordinates: 31°07′51″N 50°28′20″E
- Country: Iran
- Province: Kohgiluyeh and Boyer-Ahmad
- County: Kohgiluyeh
- Bakhsh: Charusa
- Rural District: Tayebi-ye Sarhadi-ye Sharqi

Population (2006)
  - Total: 526
- Time zone: UTC+3:30 (IRST)
  - Summer (DST): UTC+4:30 (IRDT)

Algen (Persian: الگن, also Romanized as Algen; also known as Aglen) is a village in Tayebi-ye Sarhadi-ye Sharqi Rural District, Charusa District, Kohgiluyeh County, Kohgiluyeh and Boyer-Ahmad Province, Iran. At the 2006 census, its population was 526, in 85 families.
