= Humble Point =

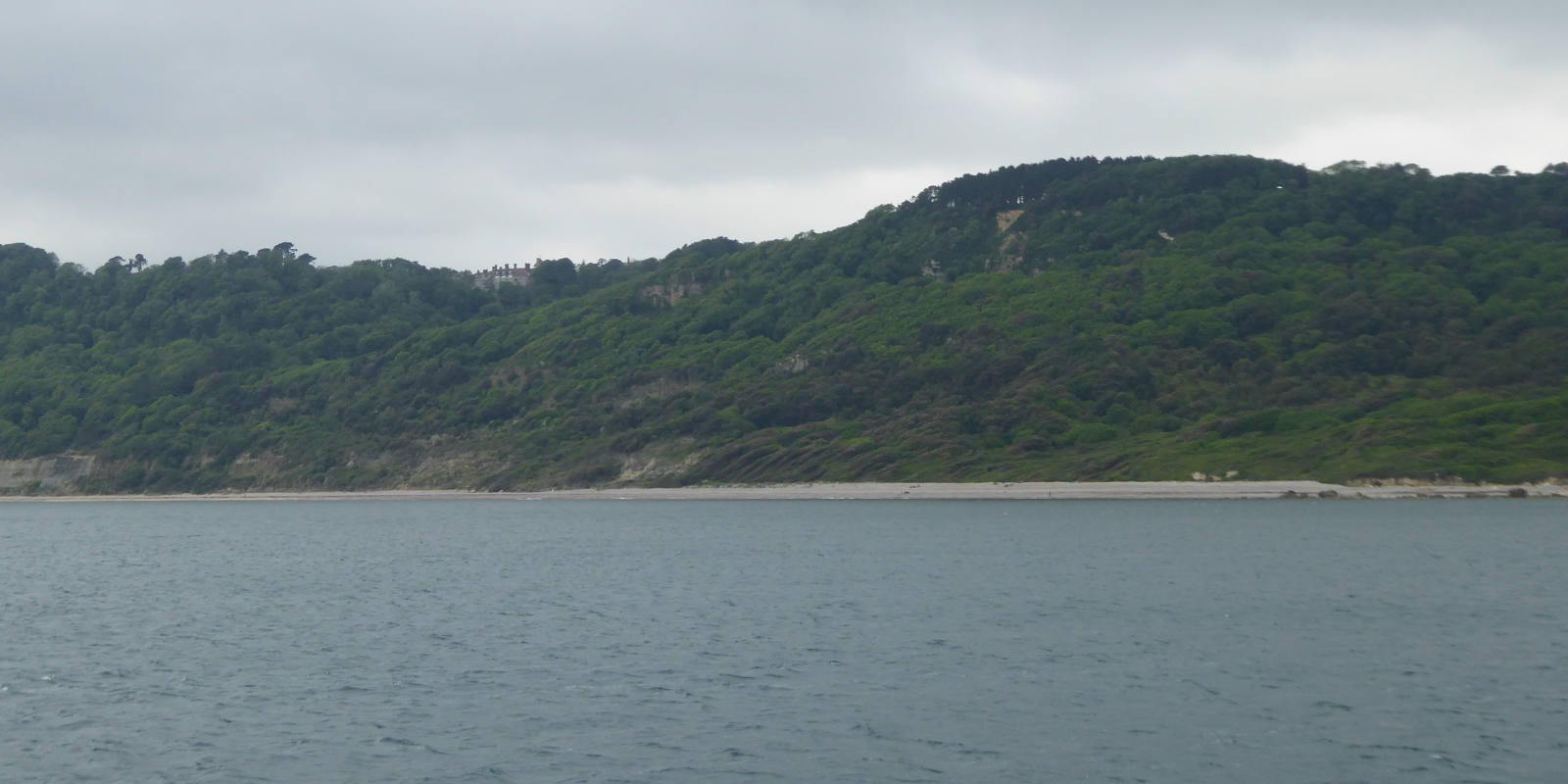
The western side of Humble Point

Humble Point (61°11′S 54°8′W) is a low point 5 nautical miles (9 km) southwest of Cape Lloyd on the west coast of Clarence Island in the South Shetland Islands. The feature is called "Punta Baja" (low point) on Argentine government charts of the 1950s, but that descriptive name is repetitive. The UK Antarctic Place-Names Committee recommended translation of "Punta Baja" to Humble Point in 1971, and that form has been approved to avoid duplication.
