= Midge Lake =

Lake in Antarctica

Location of Byers Peninsula on Livingston Island in the South Shetland Islands

Topographic map of Antarctic Specially Protected Area ASPA 126 Byers Peninsula

Topographic map of Livingston Island, Greenwich, Robert, Snow and Smith Islands

Midge Lake is the largest among numerous freshwater lakes on the ice-free Byers Peninsula, Livingston Island in the South Shetland Islands, Antarctica. The feature is arcuate in shape, extending 575 m in a southwest-northeast direction and 125 m wide, surmounted by Chester Cone on the southeast, and draining through a 2 km stream north-northeastwards into Baba Tonka Cove.

The lake's name derives from the chironomid midge Belgica antarctica, a rare and localized insect in the South Shetlands, the imagos of which are found beneath the surrounding rock debris in summer.

== Location ==
Midge Lake is centred at 62°37′49″S 61°05′42″W which is 860 m northwest of Chester Cone and 1.19 km southeast of President Hill (British mapping in 1968, detailed Spanish mapping in 1992, and Bulgarian mapping in 2005 and 2009).

== Maps ==
- Península Byers, Isla Livingston. Mapa topográfico a escala 1:25000. Madrid: Servicio Geográfico del Ejército, 1992.
- L. Ivanov et al. Antarctica: Livingston Island and Greenwich Island, South Shetland Islands. Scale 1:100000 topographic map. Sofia: Antarctic Place-names Commission of Bulgaria, 2005.
- L. Ivanov. Antarctica: Livingston Island and Greenwich, Robert, Snow and Smith Islands. Scale 1:120000 topographic map. Troyan: Manfred Wörner Foundation, 2009. ISBN 978-954-92032-6-4
- L. Ivanov. Antarctica: Livingston Island and Smith Island. Scale 1:100000 topographic map. Manfred Wörner Foundation, 2017. ISBN 978-619-90008-3-0
