= Cornwallis Island (South Shetland Islands) =

Island of Antarctica

- A map of the South Shetland Islands, Cornwallis is upper right

- Location within South Shetland Islands Location within Antarctica

Geography
- Location: Antarctica
- Coordinates: 61°04′S 54°28′W
- Archipelago: South Shetland Islands
- Length: 1.0 mi (1.6 km)

Administration
- Administered under the Antarctic Treaty System

Demographics
- Population: uninhabited

Cornwallis Island is an island 1 mile (1.6 km) long, which lies 5 miles (8 km) northeast of the east end of Elephant Island, in the South Shetland Islands.

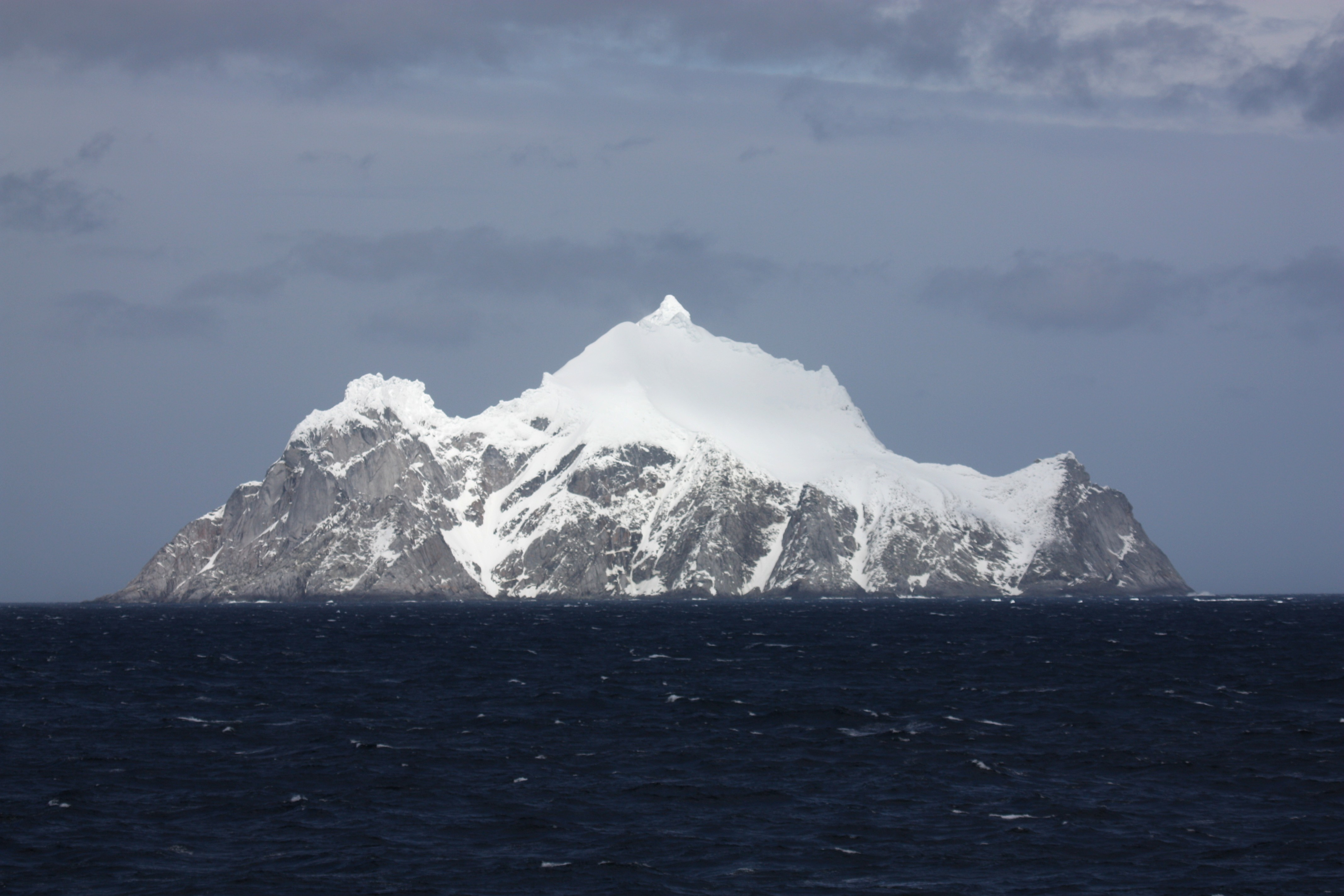
Cornwallis Island

== See also ==
- Composite Antarctic Gazetteer
- List of Antarctic islands south of 60° S
- Prince Charles Strait
- Scientific Committee on Antarctic Research
- Territorial claims in Antarctica
