= Start Point (Livingston Island) =

Point marking the northwest end of Byers Peninsula in the South Shetland Islands

Location of Byers Peninsula, Livingston Island in the South Shetland Islands.

Topographic map of Byers Peninsula featuring Antarctic Specially Protected Area ASPA 126 and its two restricted zones

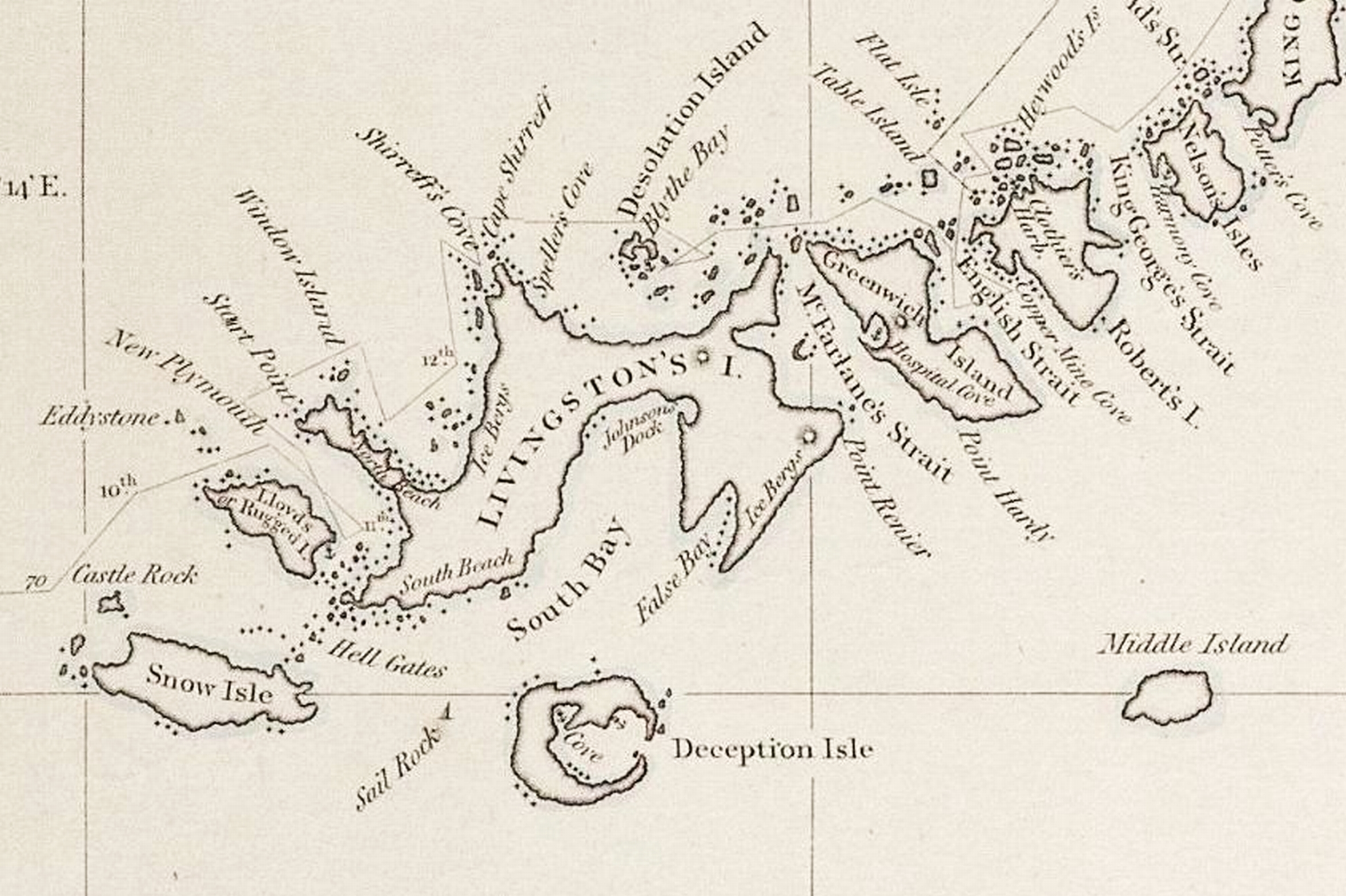
Fragment of George Powell's 1822 chart of the South Shetland Islands and South Orkney Islands featuring Start Point

Topographic map of Livingston Island.

Start Point is a point marking the northwest end of Byers Peninsula, Livingston Island in the South Shetland Islands, Antarctica and forming the southwest side of the entrance to Svishtov Cove and the northeast side of the entrance to the New Plymouth bay. Discovered by Edward Bransfield in January 1820, and so named by him because of its resemblance to a point on the south coast of England by the same name and because it was the place where his operations began.

The feature is part of the Antarctic Specially Protected Area ASPA 126 Byers Peninsula, situated in one of its restricted zones.

== Location ==
The point is located at 62°35′20″S 61°12′57.9″W which is 2.18 km southwest of Essex Point and 5.15 km northeast of Cape Sheffield (British mapping in 1820 and 1968, detailed Spanish mapping in 1992, and Bulgarian mapping in 2005 and 2009).

== Maps ==
- Chart of South Shetland including Coronation Island, &c. from the exploration of the sloop Dove in the years 1821 and 1822 by George Powell Commander of the same. Scale ca. 1:200000. London: Laurie, 1822.
- South Shetland Islands. Scale 1:200000 topographic map. DOS 610 Sheet W 62 60. Tolworth, UK, 1968.
- Isla Elefante a Isla Trinidad. Mapa hidrográfico a escala 1:500000 - 1:350000. Valparaíso: Instituto Hidrográfico de la Armada de Chile, 1971.
- Islas Shetland del Sur de Isla 25 de Mayo a Isla Livingston. Mapa hidrográfico a escala 1:200000. Buenos Aires: Servicio de Hidrografía Naval de la Armada, 1980.
- Península Byers, Isla Livingston. Mapa topográfico a escala 1:25000. Madrid: Servicio Geográfico del Ejército, 1992.
- L.L. Ivanov et al. Antarctica: Livingston Island and Greenwich Island, South Shetland Islands. Scale 1:100000 topographic map. Sofia: Antarctic Place-names Commission of Bulgaria, 2005.
- L.L. Ivanov. Antarctica: Livingston Island and Greenwich, Robert, Snow and Smith Islands. Scale 1:120000 topographic map. Troyan: Manfred Wörner Foundation, 2009. ISBN 978-954-92032-6-4
- Antarctic Digital Database (ADD). Scale 1:250000 topographic map of Antarctica. Scientific Committee on Antarctic Research (SCAR). Since 1993, regularly updated.
- L.L. Ivanov. Antarctica: Livingston Island and Smith Island. Scale 1:100000 topographic map. Manfred Wörner Foundation, 2017. ISBN 978-619-90008-3-0
