= Ray Promontory =

- Cape
- Topographic map of Livingston Island
- Interactive map of Ray Promontory
- Location: Antarctica

Location of Byers Peninsula, Livingston Island in the South Shetland Islands

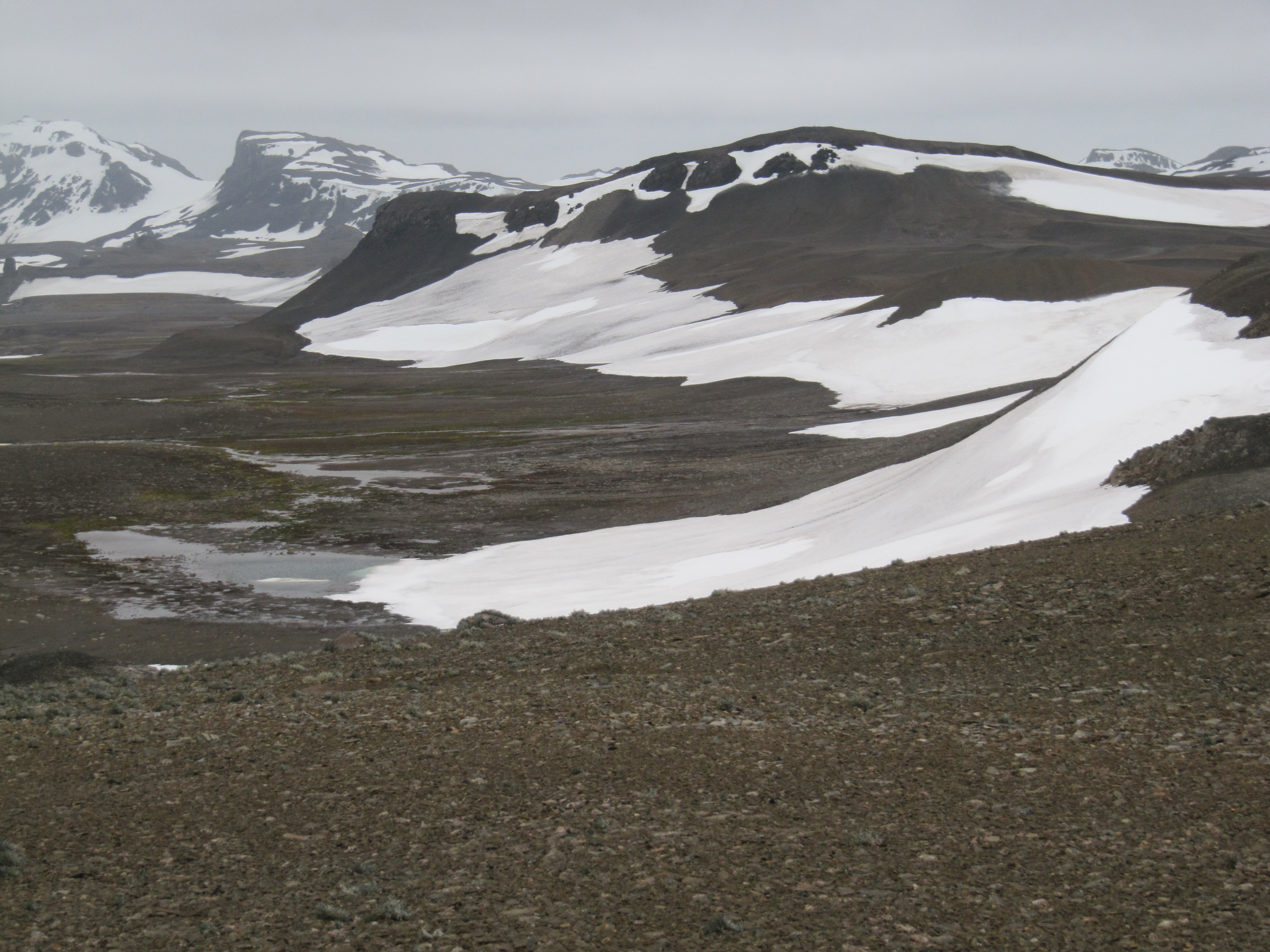
Dospey Heights on Ray Promontory from near Midge Lake on Byers Peninsula in Livingston Island, with Start Hill and Dulo Hill in the left background and Penca Hill in the right background

Map of Byers Peninsula featuring Antarctic Specially Protected Area ASPA 126 and its two restricted zones Ray Promontory and Ivanov Beach

Ray Promontory is a promontory, 7 km long and 2.8 km wide, between Barclay Bay and the New Plymouth sound, and forming the northwest part of Byers Peninsula, Livingston Island, in the South Shetland Islands, Antarctica, ending up in Start Point and Essex Point. The promontory's interior is mostly occupied by Dospey Heights.

The feature is part of the Antarctic Specially Protected Area ASPA 126 Byers Peninsula, forming in one of its two restricted zones.

The feature is named after the American Captain Nathaniel Ray, Master of the sealing schooner Harmony, which operated in the islands in 1820–21 .

== Location ==
The promontory is centered at 62°36′00″S 61°08′40″W (British mapping in 1968, detailed Spanish mapping in 1992, and Bulgarian mapping in 2005 and 2009).

== Maps ==
- Península Byers, Isla Livingston. Mapa topográfico a escala 1:25000. Madrid: Servicio Geográfico del Ejército, 1992. (Map image on p. 55 of the linked study)
- L.L. Ivanov et al. Antarctica: Livingston Island and Greenwich Island, South Shetland Islands. Scale 1:100000 topographic map. Sofia: Antarctic Place-names Commission of Bulgaria, 2005.
- L.L. Ivanov. Antarctica: Livingston Island and Greenwich, Robert, Snow and Smith Islands. Scale 1:120000 topographic map. Troyan: Manfred Wörner Foundation, 2009. ISBN 978-954-92032-6-4
- Antarctic Digital Database (ADD). Scale 1:250000 topographic map of Antarctica. Scientific Committee on Antarctic Research (SCAR). Since 1993, regularly upgraded and updated.
- L.L. Ivanov. Antarctica: Livingston Island and Smith Island. Scale 1:100000 topographic map. Manfred Wörner Foundation, 2017. ISBN 978-619-90008-3-0

== See also ==
- Rame Bluff, on the southwest side of Ray Promontory
