= Essex Point =

Point in the South Shetland Islands, Antarctica

Location of Byers Peninsula, Livingston Island in the South Shetland Islands.

Topographic map of Byers Peninsula featuring Antarctic Specially Protected Area ASPA 126 and its two restricted zones

Topographic map of Livingston Island and Smith Island

Essex Point is a point at the northwest end of Byers Peninsula, Livingston Island in the South Shetland Islands, Antarctica. It forms the west side of the entrance to Barclay Bay and the northeast side of the entrance to Svishtov Cove, and is surmounted by Drong Hill.

The feature is part of the Antarctic Specially Protected Area ASPA 126 Byers Peninsula, situated in one of its restricted zones.

It was named by the UK Antarctic Place-names Committee (UK-APC) in 1958 after the American sealing ship Essex (under Captain Chester), one of the fleet of American sealers from Stonington, CT, which visited the South Shetland Islands in 1820–21 and 1821–22.

== Location ==
The point is located at 62°34′33.9″S 61°11′02″W which is 2.18 km northeast of Start Point and 24.16 kn southwest of Cape Shirreff (Argentine mapping in 1954, British mapping in 1968, detailed Spanish mapping in 1992, and Bulgarian mapping in 2005, 2009 and 2017).

== Maps ==
- Chart of South Shetland including Coronation Island, &c. from the exploration of the sloop Dove in the years 1821 and 1822 by George Powell Commander of the same. Scale ca. 1:200000. London: Laurie, 1822.
- South Shetland Islands. Scale 1:200000 topographic map. DOS 610 Sheet W 62 60. Tolworth, UK, 1968.
- Isla Elefante a Isla Trinidad. Mapa hidrográfico a escala 1:500000 - 1:350000. Valparaíso: Instituto Hidrográfico de la Armada de Chile, 1971.
- Islas Shetland del Sur de Isla 25 de Mayo a Isla Livingston. Mapa hidrográfico a escala 1:200000. Buenos Aires: Servicio de Hidrografía Naval de la Armada, 1980.
- Península Byers, Isla Livingston. Mapa topográfico a escala 1:25000. Madrid: Servicio Geográfico del Ejército, 1992.
- L.L. Ivanov et al. Antarctica: Livingston Island and Greenwich Island, South Shetland Islands. Scale 1:100000 topographic map. Sofia: Antarctic Place-names Commission of Bulgaria, 2005.
- L.L. Ivanov. Antarctica: Livingston Island and Greenwich, Robert, Snow and Smith Islands. Scale 1:120000 topographic map. Troyan: Manfred Wörner Foundation, 2009. ISBN 978-954-92032-6-4
- Antarctic Digital Database (ADD). Scale 1:250000 topographic map of Antarctica. Scientific Committee on Antarctic Research (SCAR). Since 1993, regularly updated.
- L.L. Ivanov. Antarctica: Livingston Island and Smith Island. Scale 1:100000 topographic map. Manfred Wörner Foundation, 2017. ISBN 978-619-90008-3-0
