= Invisible Island =

Island in the Bay of Isles, South Georgia

Invisible Island (54°1′S 37°19′W) is a small, tussock-covered island lying close southeast of Crescent Island and Mollyhawk Island in the Bay of Isles, South Georgia. It was charted in 1912–13 by Robert Cushman Murphy, an American naturalist aboard the brig Daisy, and was probably named by Discovery Investigations personnel who surveyed the Bay of Isles in 1929–30.

A chain of rocks called the Hogs Mouth Rocks extend south from Invisible Island, also charted by Murphy, but probably named by Discovery Investigations personnel who surveyed the Bay of Isles in 1929–30.

== See also ==
- List of Antarctic and sub-Antarctic islands
