= Skua Island =

Island in the Bay of Isles, South Georgia

Location of Skua Island in the Bay of Isles

Skua Island (54°1′S 37°15′W) is an island immediately northeast of Prion Island in the entrance to the Bay of Isles, South Georgia. Charted in 1912-13 by Robert Cushman Murphy, American naturalist aboard the brig Daisy. Surveyed in 1929-30 by DI personnel and named in association with Albatross Island, Prion Island and other natural history names given in the Bay of Isles by Murphy in 1912–13.

Rescue Rock (54°0′S 37°14′W) is a submerged rock marked by breakers, 0.6 nautical miles (1.1 km) northeast of Skua Island. It was charted in 1930 by DI survey personnel. So named because a whale catcher passing near this rock sighted a flag on Skua Island, eventually leading to the rescue of the survey party at Camp Bay where their vessel had run aground.

== See also ==
- List of Antarctic and sub-Antarctic islands
