= Dot Island (South Georgia) =

Island in South Georgia and the South Sandwich Islands, United Kingdom

Dot Island in the sub-Antarctic (54°3′S 37°21′W) is a tiny island lying 0.6 nautical miles (1.1 km) west of Tern Island in the south part of the Bay of Isles, South Georgia. It was first charted by Robert Cushman Murphy in 1912–13 and surveyed in 1929–30 by Discovery Investigations personnel, who probably so named it because of its size and minute appearance when represented on charts.

== See also ==
- List of Antarctic and sub-Antarctic islands
