= Tern Island (South Georgia) =

Location of Tern Island in the Bay of Isles

Tern Island in the south part of the Bay of Isles, South Georgia (54°3′S 37°20′W) is a small, tussock-covered island lying 1.6 km (1 mile) south of Albatross Island and 10 km (6 miles) east of Dot Island.

It was first charted in 1912–13 by Robert Cushman Murphy, American naturalist aboard the brig Daisy. Surveyed in 1929–30 by DI personnel, who named it in association with Albatross Island, Prion Island and other natural history names given in the Bay of Isles by Murphy in 1912–13.

== See also ==
- List of Antarctic and sub-Antarctic islands
