= Mollyhawk Island =

Island in the Bay of Isles, South Georgia

Location of Mollyhawk Island within the Bay of Isles

Mollyhawk Island (54°1′S 37°19′W) is a small, tussock-covered island lying between Seaward Rock and Crescent Island in the northern part of the Bay of Isles, South Georgia. It was charted in 1912–13 by Robert Cushman Murphy, an American naturalist aboard the brig Daisy. The island was surveyed in 1929–30 by Discovery Investigations personnel and named in association with Albatross Island, Prion Island and other natural history names in the Bay of Isles given by Murphy, "mollyhawk" being a name for a type of young gull.

== See also ==
- List of Antarctic and sub-Antarctic islands
