= Mount Ashley =

Mountain in South Georgia

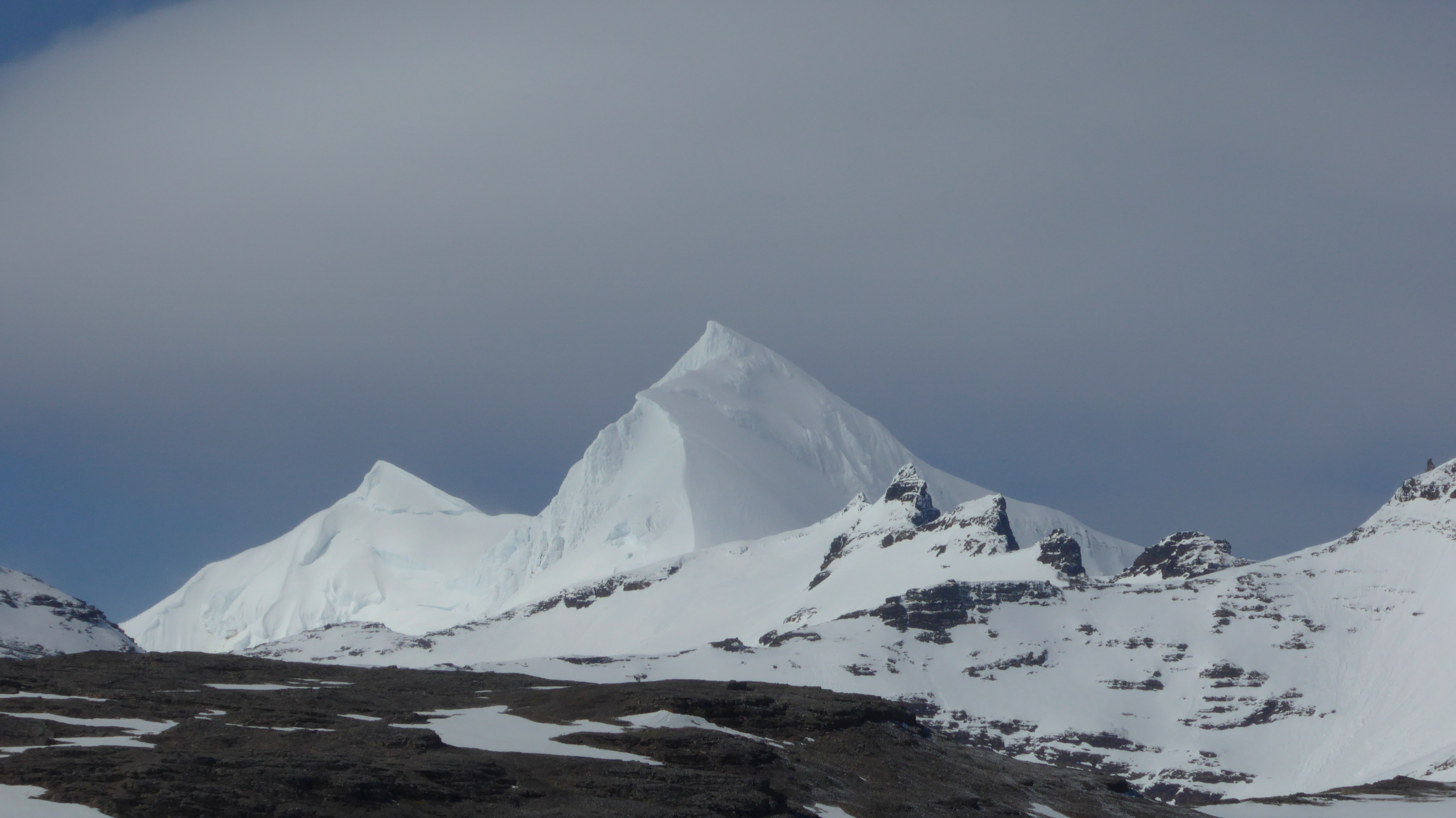
- Mount Ashley, South Georgia, viewed from Salisbury Plain. Photo by Roger Bilder

Highest point
- Elevation: 1,155 m (3,789 ft)
- Coordinates: 54.150°S 36.700°W

Geography
- Location: South Georgia

Mount Ashley (54°7′S 37°21′W) is a mountain, 1,155 metres (3,790 ft) high, standing south of the Bay of Isles, South Georgia, between the heads of Grace Glacier and Lucas Glacier. Salisbury Plain is nearby. It is named for Clifford Warren Ashley, an American artist, author, and whaling historian.

The name "Clifford Ashley Mountains" was used by Robert Cushman Murphy for a number of scattered mountains and ridges on the south side of the Bay of Isles, following his visit to South Georgia in 1912–13. The South Georgia Survey, 1955–56, reported that a group name for these features is unsuitable and an altered form of the name was applied to the highest of the mountains, Mount Ashley.

The first recorded ascent of Mount Ashley was in 2009 by members of the American Alpine Club.
