= Inner Lee Island =

Island in the United Kingdom

Inner Lee Island (54°2′S 37°16′W) is a small island 1.3 km (0.8 mi) north-northeast of Luck Point, lying in the Bay of Isles, South Georgia. This island was charted in 1912–13 by Robert Cushman Murphy, an American naturalist aboard the brig Daisy, who included it as one of two islands which he called the "Lee Islands". These islands were recharted in 1929–30 by Discovery Investigations personnel, who renamed this southwestern of the two, Inner Lee Island. The northeastern island is now known as Outer Lee Island.

== See also ==
- List of Antarctic and sub-Antarctic islands
