= Petrel Island (South Georgia) =

Island in South Georgia

Petrel Island (54°2′S 37°17′W) is an island 1.2 km (0.75 miles) southwest of Prion Island, lying in the Bay of Isles, South Georgia. First charted in 1912–13 by Robert Cushman Murphy, American naturalist aboard the brig Daisy. Recharted in 1929–30 by DI personnel, who so named it because of its association with Prion Island. Prions have been observed in these islands.

== See also ==
- List of Antarctic and sub-Antarctic islands
