= Tern Island =

Tern Island can also refer to:

- Tern Island (Hawaii), the main island in the atoll of French Frigate Shoals, in the Northwestern Hawaiian Islands
- Tern Island (Queensland), Australia
- Tern Island, South Georgia
- Tern Island Natural Area, a protected area of Bent County, Colorado, USA
- Tern Island in Pleasant Bay, Cape Cod, Massachusetts
- Siuraq, formerly Tern Island, Nunavut, Canada
