= Diomedea Island =

- Location within Antarctica

Geography
- Location: Antarctica
- Coordinates: 62°12′14″S 58°56′53″W

Administration
- Administered under the Antarctic Treaty System

Demographics
- Population: Uninhabited

Diomedea Island is a small island lying in Ardley Cove, Fildes Peninsula, King George Island, in the South Shetland Islands. The Soviet Antarctic Expedition called the feature "Ostrov Al'batros" or "Albatross Island" in 1968, but the English form duplicates a name in the Bay of Isles. To avoid confusion, the UK Antarctic Place-Names Committee recommended a new name in 1979, Diomedea being the generic name for several species of albatross.

== See also ==
- List of antarctic and sub-antarctic islands
