= Outer Lee Island =

Island in South Georgia

Outer Lee Island (54°2′S 37°14′W) is a small island 1.5 nautical miles (2.8 km) north-northwest of Bellingshausen Point, lying in the outer part of the Bay of Isles, South Georgia. This island was charted in 1912–13 by Robert Cushman Murphy, American naturalist aboard the brig Daisy, who included it as one of two islands which he called the Lee Islands. These islands were recharted in 1929–30 by DI personnel, who renamed this northeastern of the two, Outer Lee Island. The southwestern island is now known as Inner Lee Island.

== See also ==
- List of Antarctic and sub-Antarctic islands
