= Salisbury Plain, South Georgia =

Coastal plain in South Georgia

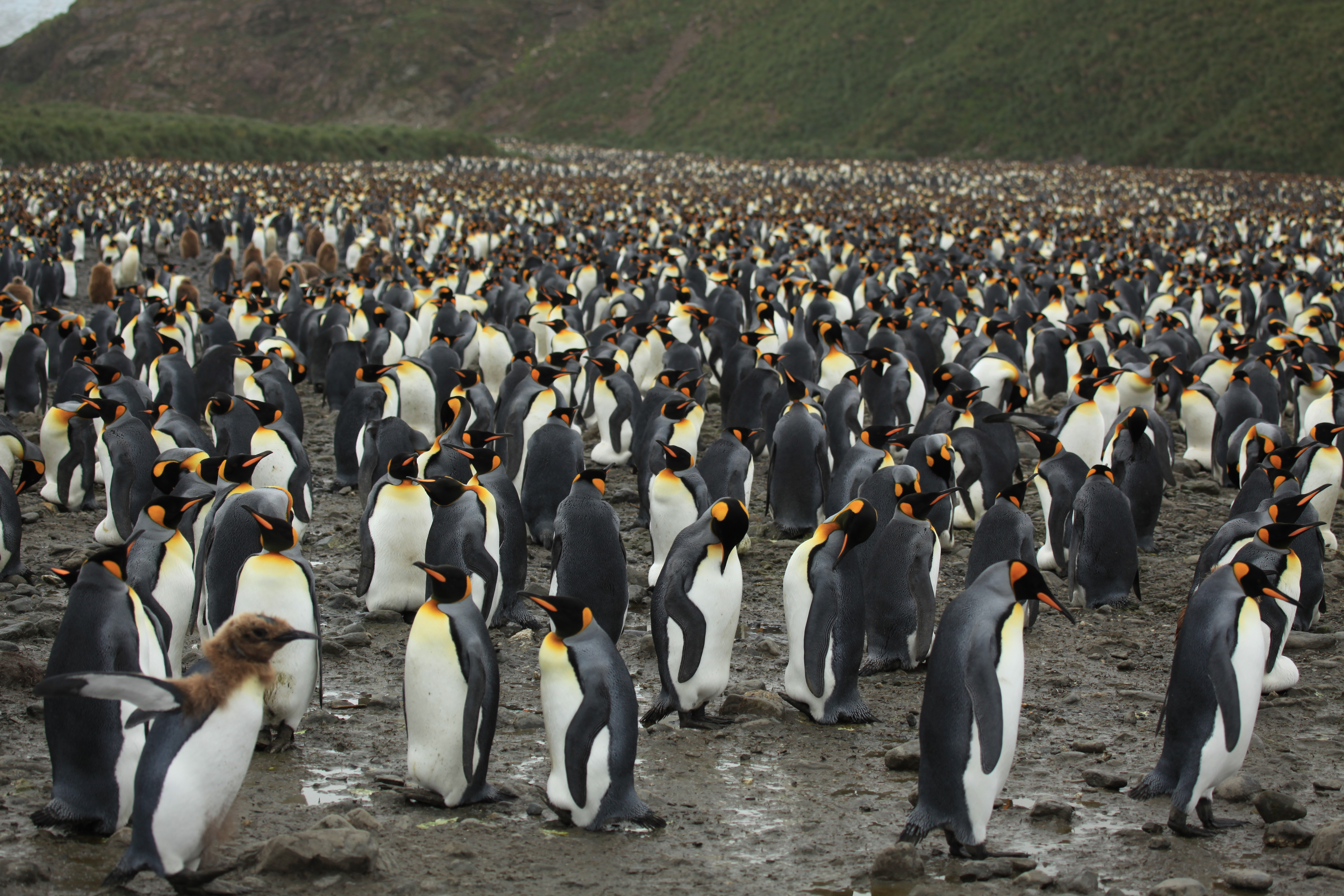
A colony of up to 60,000 King penguins on Salisbury Plain (Aptenodytes patagonicus).

Salisbury Plain (Spanish: Llanura de Salisbury) (54°3′S 37°21′W) is a broad coastal plain found with the Bay of Isles on the north coast of South Georgia. It lies between the mouths of Grace and Lucas glaciers on the southern coast of the bay, with Mount Ashley south of it. Best known as the breeding site for as many as 60,000 king penguins, its beaches are also covered with many southern elephant seals and Antarctic fur seals.

American ornithologist Robert Cushman Murphy made the first detailed study of the birds in the area in 1912–13. He named nearby Grace Glacier after his wife.

The name appears to have been first used on a 1931 British Admiralty chart.
