= Seaward Rock =

Rock in the Bay of Isles, South Georgia

Seaward Rock (54°0′S 37°19′W) is a rock close to the northeast of Mollyhawk Island, which is the northern and most seaward rock in a group of islands occupying the central part of the Bay of Isles, South Georgia.

The rock was first charted in 1912–13 by Robert Cushman Murphy, American naturalist aboard the brig Daisy. It was probably named by Discovery Investigations personnel who surveyed the Bay of Isles in 1929–30.
