= Outer Island =

Outer Island may refer to:

- Outer Island, Bermuda
- Outer islands of Mauritius
- Outer Islands (Seychelles)
- Outer Island (Connecticut), United States
- Outer Island (Wisconsin), United States

== See also ==
- Outer Barrier Islands
- Outer Brewster Island
- Outer Hebrides
- Outer Holm of Skaw
- Outer Lee Island
- Outer Sister Island
- Utö (disambiguation)
- Utøy
- Utøya
