= Pyramid Peak (South Georgia) =

Mountain in South Georgia

Pyramid Peak (54°00′S 37°23′W) is a peak, 475 metres (1,558 ft) high, surmounting Cape Buller at the west side of the entrance to the Bay of Isles, South Georgia Island. It was mapped in 1902 by the Swedish Antarctic Expedition and named descriptively "Die Pyramide."
