= Nirlirnaqtuuq =

Island in Nunavut, Canada

- Location within Nunavut Location within Canada

Geography
- Location: Foxe Basin
- Coordinates: 69°28′58″N 81°34′47″W
- Archipelago: Arctic Archipelago

Administration
- Canada
- Territory: Nunavut
- Region: Qikiqtaaluk

Demographics
- Population: Uninhabited

Nirlirnaqtuuq (ᓂᕐᓕᕐᓇᖅᑑᖅ formerly Neerlonakto Island (alternate: Nerdlernartoq,) is an irregularly shaped, extremely flat, uninhabited island in the Qikiqtaaluk Region, Nunavut, Canada. It is located in Foxe Basin with the mainland's Melville Peninsula is to the west and Baffin Island is to the north. The Inuit community of Igloolik is located 14 km (8.7 mi) southwest, on Igloo Island. Tern Island is 31.7 km (19.7 mi) to the east.
