= Morris Glacier (South Georgia) =

Glacier in Antarctica

- Location within South Georgia Island
- Location: South Georgia
- Coordinates: 54°5′S 37°14′W
- Thickness: unknown
- Terminus: Bay of Isles
- Status: unknown

Morris Glacier (54°5′S 37°14′W) is a glacier flowing north to the head of Sea Leopard Fjord in the Bay of Isles, South Georgia. it was charted in 1912–13 by American naturalist Robert Cushman Murphy, aboard the brig Daisy, who named it for Edward Lyman Morris, a botanist who was then head of the Department of Natural Science at the Brooklyn Museum.

== See also ==
- List of glaciers in the Antarctic
- Glaciology
