= Morris Glacier =

Morris Glacier may refer to:

- Morris Glacier (Ross Dependency)
- Morris Glacier (South Georgia)
