= Sky Rock =

Sky Rock (53°59′S 37°30′W) is a small rock, 3 m high, marking the southern extent of the Welcome Islands off the north coast of South Georgia. Charted and named by DI personnel in 1930.

== See also ==
- Whalers Passage
