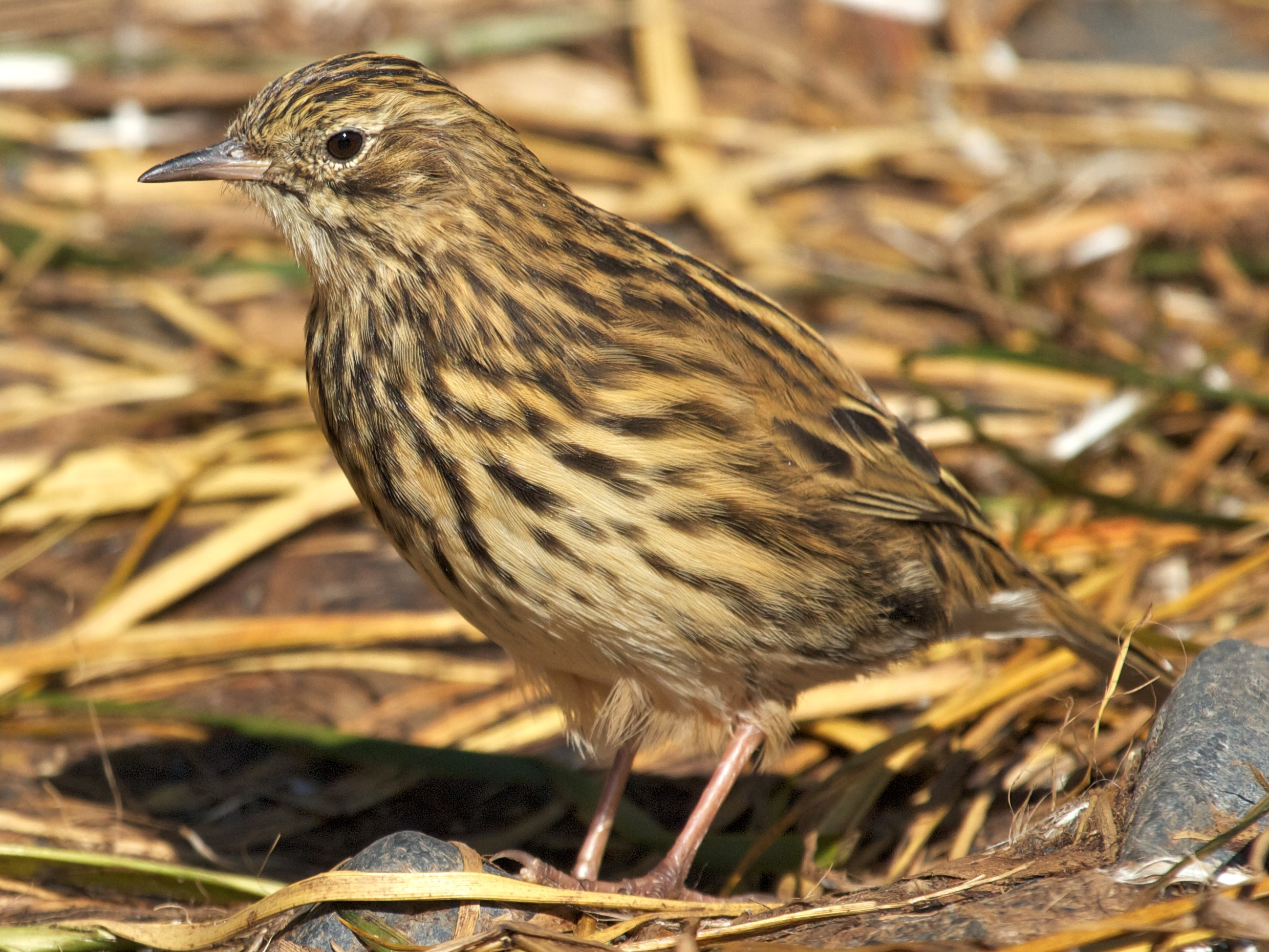
- On South Georgia, British overseas territory

Conservation status
- Least Concern (IUCN 3.1)

Scientific classification
- Kingdom: Animalia
- Phylum: Chordata
- Class: Aves
- Order: Passeriformes
- Family: Motacillidae
- Genus: Anthus
- Species: A. antarcticus

Binomial name
- Anthus antarcticus Cabanis, 1884

= South Georgia pipit =

Species of bird

The South Georgia pipit (Anthus antarcticus) is a sparrow-sized bird found only on the South Georgia archipelago off the Antarctic Peninsula. It is the only songbird in Antarctica, South Georgia's only passerine, and one of the few non-seabirds found in the region. It builds nests from dried grass, usually within tussac grass, and lays four eggs a year. It feeds on small insects and spiders, and beach debris.

== Taxonomy ==
The South Georgia pipit was formally described in 1884 by the German ornithologist Jean Cabanis based on a specimen collected on South Georgia. The specific epithet is derived from the Latin word antarcticus, meaning 'southern' or 'antarctic'. It is also known as the Antarctic pipit.

== Description ==
The South Georgia pipit is a small and stocky pipit, 17 cm (6.7 in) long and weighing 36 g (1.3 oz). The species has long legs and a long hindclaw and a short tail. Its upperparts are dark brown to blackish, with cream- to buff-colored margins on the feathers making it look heavily streaked. The underparts are whitish or buff in color with dark streaks.

== Conservation ==
It has been threatened by the human introduction of rats, mice, and reindeer to South Georgia, as well as environmental damage caused by humans. It has been chosen as the poster bird of the South Georgia Heritage Trust's Habitat Restoration (Rat Eradication) project, which started eradicating rats on South Georgia in 2011. The project's baiting phase ended in early 2015, and success was confirmed in 2018.

In 2000, the population was estimated to be 6000 to 8000 mature individuals. Prior to the restoration it was rare to see South Georgia pipits, most often on the rat-free Prion Island. Afterwards their numbers have increased noticeably and are much more often seen by visitors.
