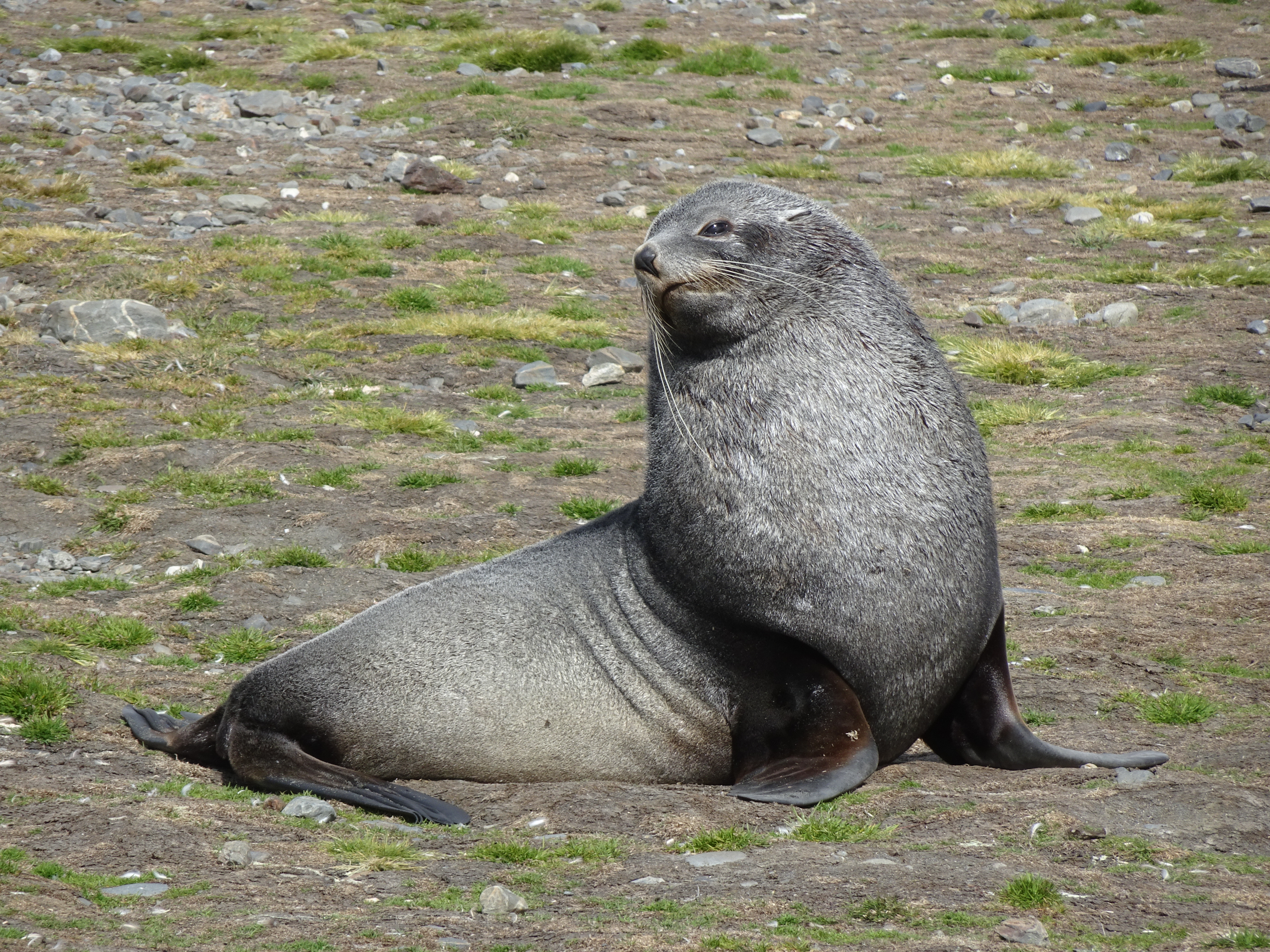
- Male Antarctic fur seal on South Georgia
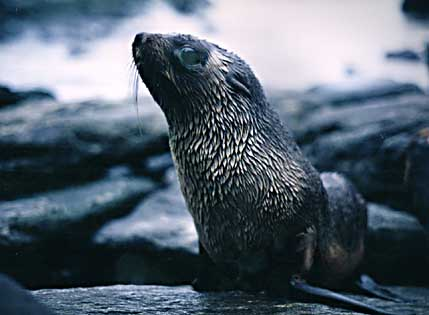

Conservation status
- Endangered (IUCN 3.1)
- CITES Appendix II

Scientific classification
- Kingdom: Animalia
- Phylum: Chordata
- Class: Mammalia
- Order: Carnivora
- Parvorder: Pinnipedia
- Family: Otariidae
- Genus: Arctocephalus
- Species: A. gazella

Binomial name
- Arctocephalus gazella Peters, 1875
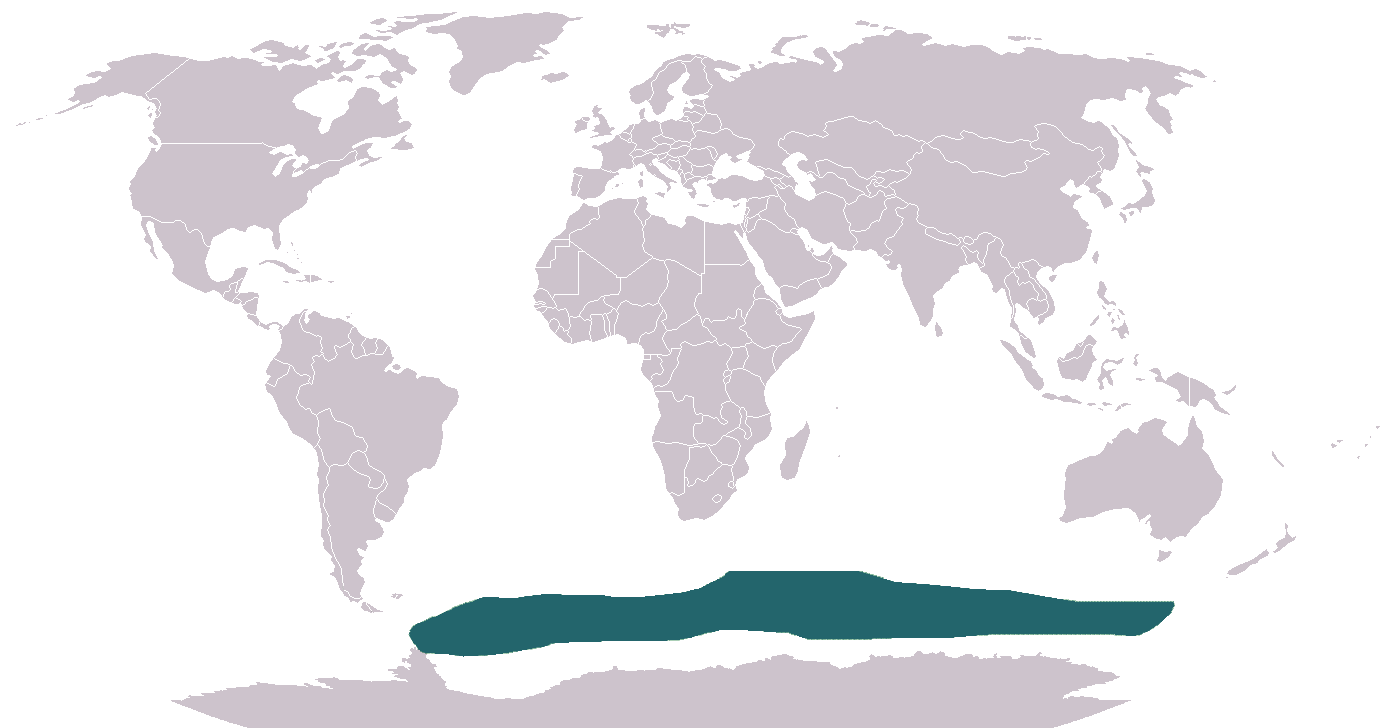
- Antarctic fur seal range

= Antarctic fur seal =

Species of semi-aquatic mammal

The Antarctic fur seal (Arctocephalus gazella) is one of eight seals in the genus Arctocephalus, and one of nine fur seals in the subfamily Arctocephalinae.

Despite what its name suggests, the Antarctic fur seal is mostly distributed in Subantarctic islands and its scientific name is thought to have come from the German vessel SMS Gazelle, which was the first to collect specimens of this species from the Kerguelen Islands.

== Taxonomy ==
The Antarctic fur seal is a member of the genus Arctocephalus. Recently, a proposal was made to reassign this species to the resurrected genus Arctophoca.

Antarctic fur seals may be confused with southern otariids that share their range, like Subantarctic (A. tropicalis), New Zealand (A. forsteri), and South American fur seals (A. australis), and the Juan Fernandez fur seal (A. phillippii), as well as the South American (Otaria flavescens) and New Zealand sea lions (Phocarctos hookeri). Genetic studies on population structure suggest that there are two genetically distinct regions: a western region including the islands of the Scotia Arc, Bouvet Island, and Marion Islands, and an eastern region, including Kerguelen and Macquarie Islands. Seals from the Crozet Islands and Heard Island are mixtures from both regions.

== Description ==
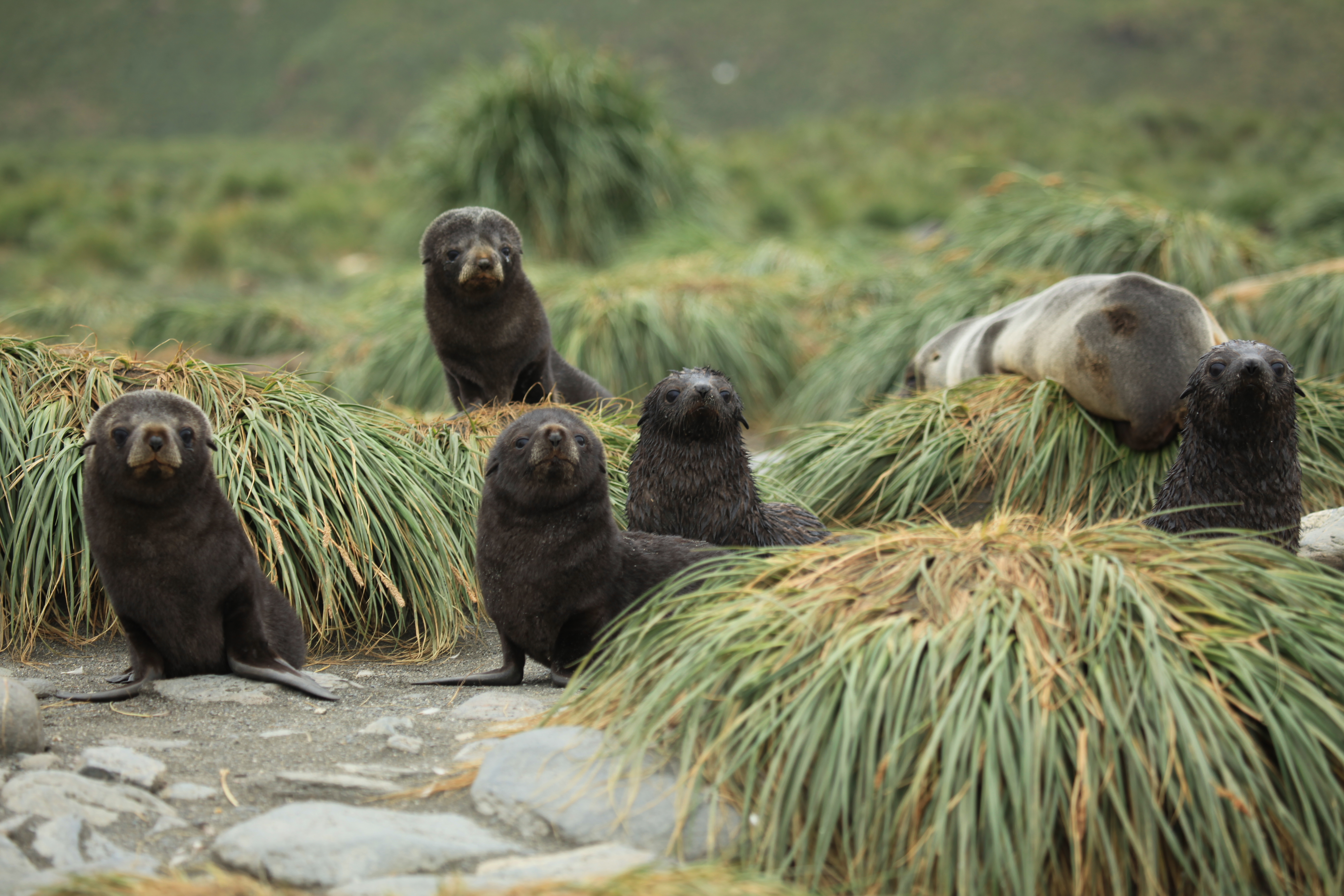
Antarctic fur seal pups on Salisbury Plain, South Georgia

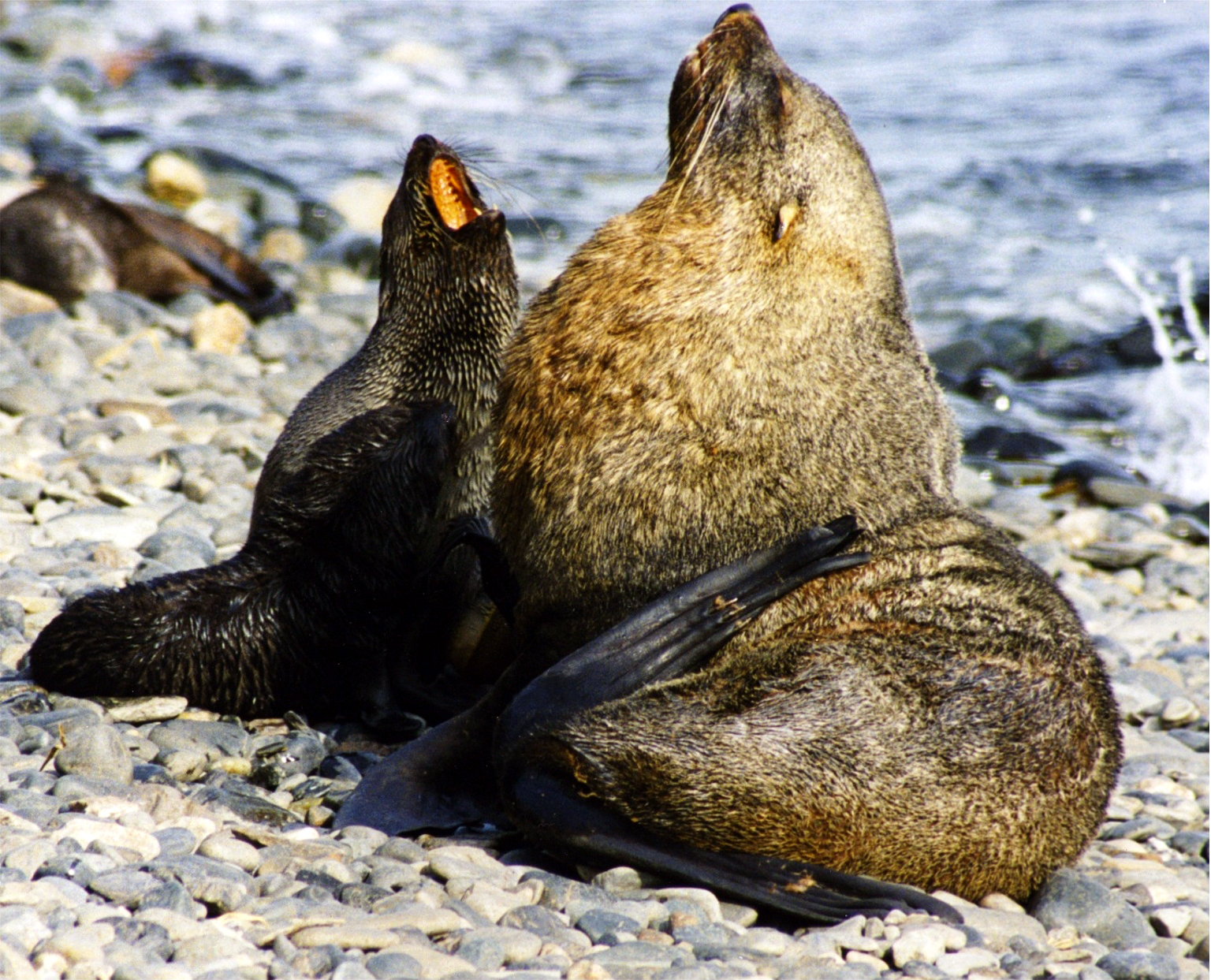
Antarctic Fur Seals (Male & Female) in South Georgia Island

The fur seal is a midsized pinniped with a relatively long neck and pointed muzzle compared with others in the family. The nose does not extend much past the mouth, the external ears are long, prominent, and naked at the tip. Adults have very long vibrissae, particularly males, up to 35 to 50 cm. The fore flippers are about one-third, and hind flippers slightly more than one-fourth of the total length.

Adult males are dark brown in colour. Females and juveniles tend to be paler, almost grey with lighter undersides. Colour patterns are highly variable, and scientists reported that some hybridization between Subantarctic and Antarctic fur seals has occurred. Pups are dark brown at birth, almost black in color. However, a very small number of partially leucistic Antarctic fur seals have been found.

Males are substantially larger than females. Males grow up to 2 m (6.5 ft) long and with a mean weight of 133 kg (293 lb). Females reach 1.4 m (4.6 ft) with a mean weight of 34 kg (74.9 lb). At birth, mean standard length is 67.4 cm (58–66) and mass is 5.9 kg (4.9–6.6) in males and 5.4 kg (4.8–5.9) in females.

Antarctic fur seals live up to 20 years with a maximum observed for female of 24.

== Distribution ==
The Antarctic fur seal is one of three fur seal species present in Antarctica and the subantarctic islands, along with the sub-Antarctic fur seal (Arctocephalus tropicalis) and New Zealand fur seal (Arctocephalus forsteri).

Antarctic fur seals are believed to be the most abundant species of fur seal. The largest congregation occurs on the island of South Georgia in the southern Atlantic Ocean, which holds approximately 95% of the global population. The current best estimate of the South Georgia population is between 4.5 and 6.2 million animals. Bouvet Island has the second largest population with 46,834 animals. However, there are regional differences in population trends: some colonies are increasing in size (e.g. Kerguelen Islands, McDonald Islands), some are stable (e.g. Macquarie Island, Heard Islands), and some are showing a decrease (e.g. Bouvet Island).

Antarctic fur seals have a circumpolar distribution and breed from 61° S to the Antarctic Convergence. Breeding colonies are found at South Georgia and the South Sandwich Islands, South Orkney Islands, South Shetland Islands and Bouvet Island in the Southern Atlantic Ocean; Marion Island, Crozet Islands, Kerguelen and Heard Island in the Southern Indian Ocean; and Macquarie Island in the Southern Pacific Ocean. During winter, Antarctic fur seals range widely from the Antarctic continent to the Falkland Islands, and southern Argentina reaching as far as the Mar del Plata and Gough Island.

== Behaviour ==
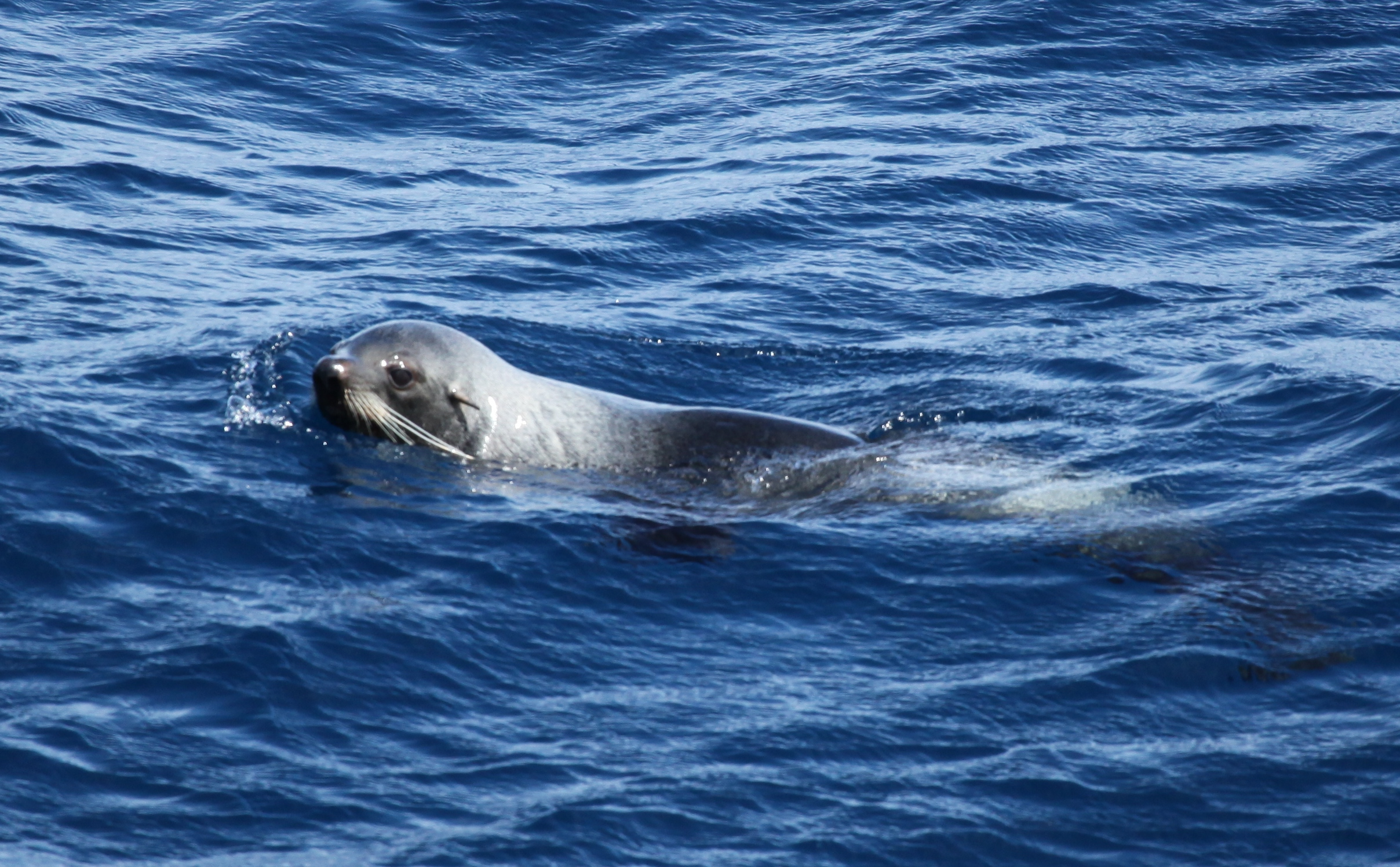
Antarctic fur seal swimming near Clarence Island

Antarctic fur seals are one of the better-studied Southern Ocean predators. However, the vast majority of information has been collected during summer breeding months. The breeding system of the Antarctic fur seal is polygynous, and dominant breeding males mate with as many as 20 females during a successful season. Males establish breeding grounds in October to early November. Females generally reach the colonies in December and give birth to a single pup several days later. Gestation lasts from 8 to 9 months and a high breeding synchrony has been observed across the species' range, concentrating 90% of pup births in a 10-day window. Pups are weaned at about four months old. Juveniles may then spend several years at sea before returning to begin their breeding cycles.

The ecology of Antarctic fur seals during the non-breeding winter is poorly understood. Adult and subadult males may form groups while moulting along the Antarctic Peninsula in late summer and early autumn. Adult females are gregarious but relatively asocial other than the strong bond they establish with their pups, although there are occasional aggressive encounters with nearby females or other pups and brief interactions with adult males to mate. These seals appear to be solitary when foraging and migrating.

The usual food source for individuals in the Atlantic Region is Antarctic krill (Euphausia superba); while in the Indian Ocean the diet is mostly based on fish and squid. The fish prey are principally myctophids, icefish, and Notothenids, although skates and rays are also consumed. Penguins are occasionally taken by Antarctic fur seal males. Seasonal differences in diet have been recorded across colonies, seasons and years. Female Antarctic fur seals can undertake wide-ranging foraging migrations during winter. Interannual differences appear to be related to differences in local oceanographic conditions.

== Diet ==
Antarctic fur seals feed primarily on krill, fish, and squid. Birds are eaten occasionally outside the breeding season. Nursing mothers near South Georgia are dependent on krill during the breeding season, therefore the availability of krill is important to the reproductive success of this animal. The colonies at Macquarie Island and the Kerguelen Islands rely more on a diet of fish and squid. Antarctic fur seals dive at night to feed.

== Population status ==
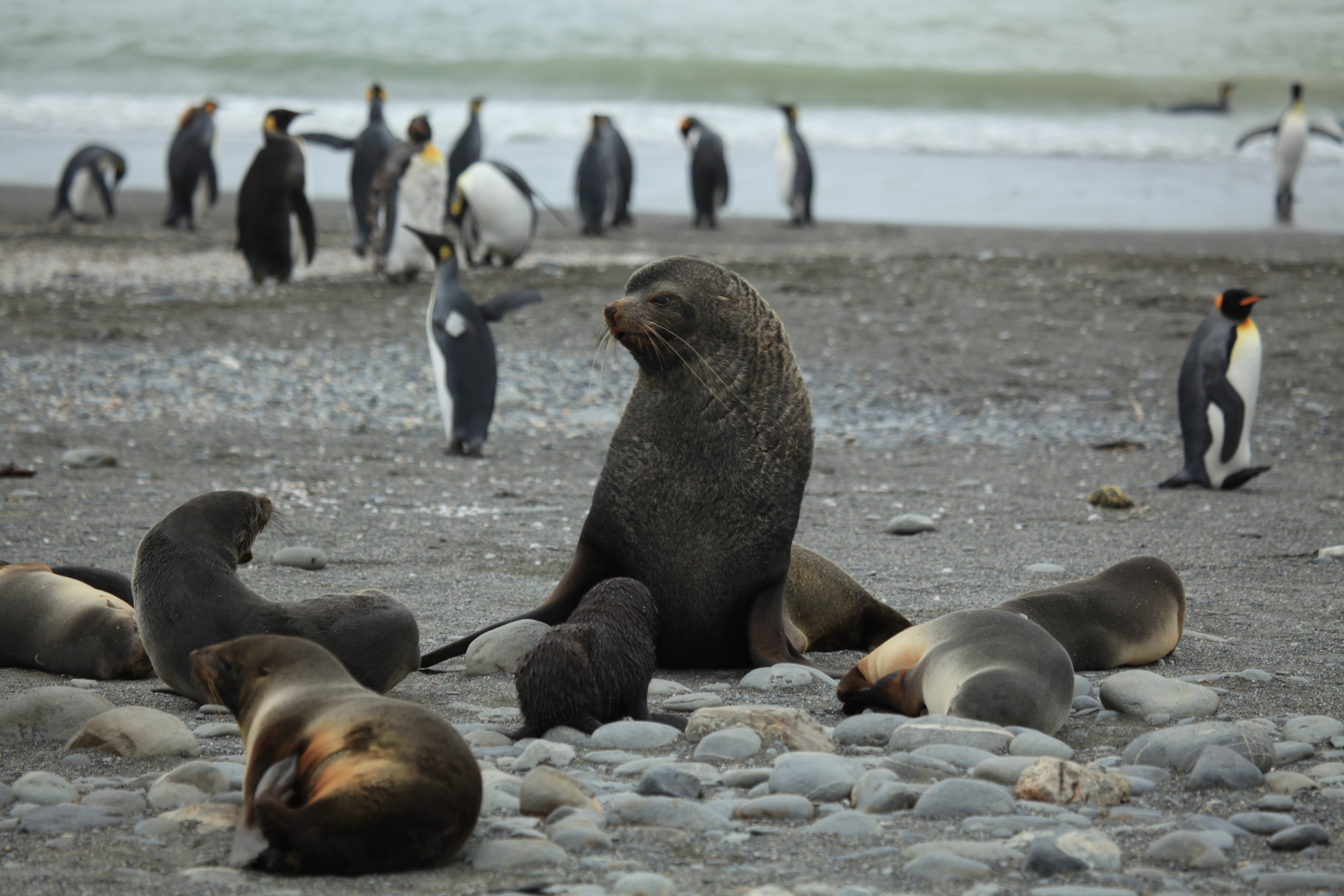
Antarctic fur seals and king penguins at Salisbury Plain, South Georgia

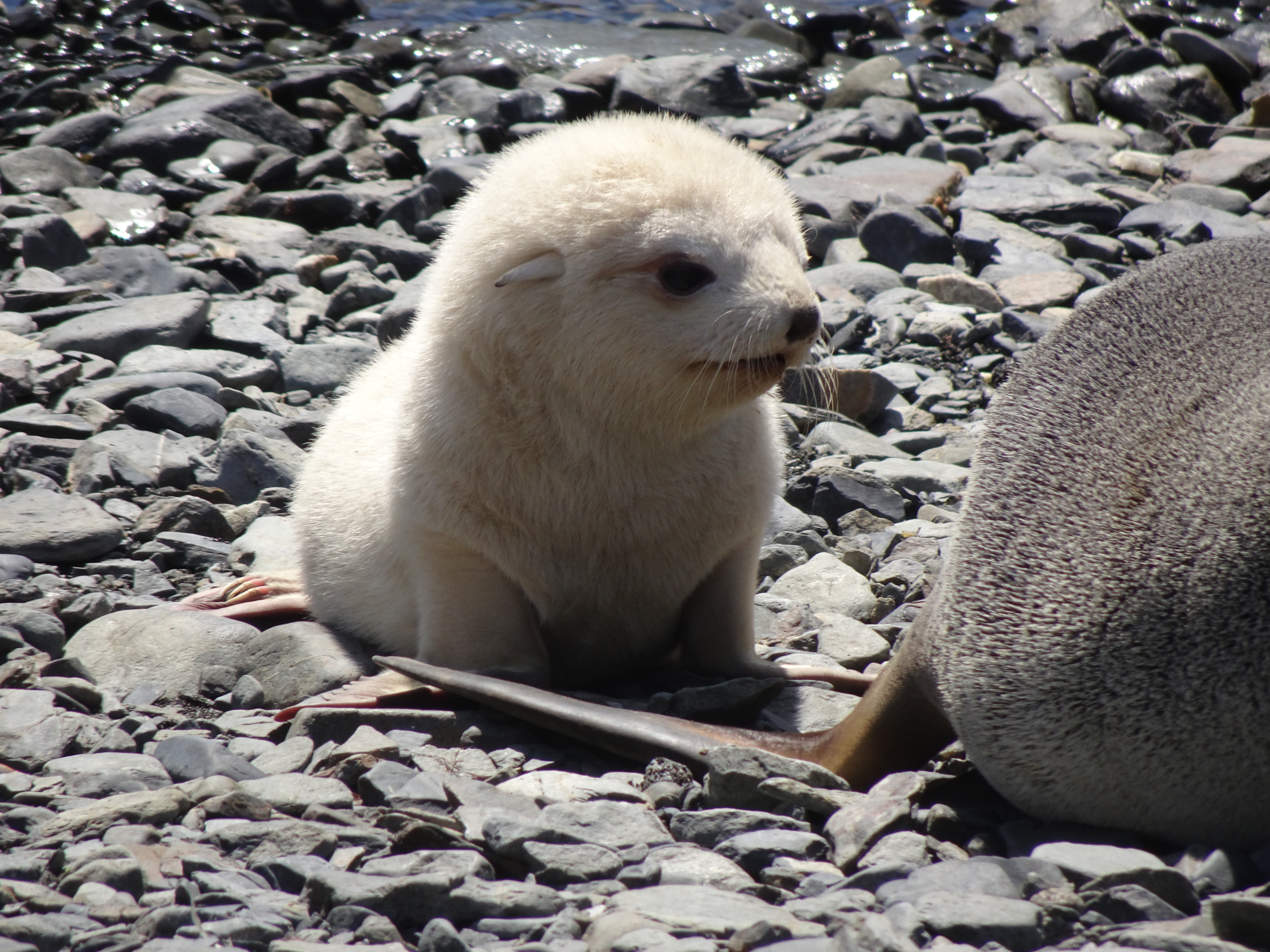
Leucistic fur seal pup in Grytviken, South Georgia

South Georgia islands, which hold approximately 95% of the global population, had a total population in 1999/2000 between 4.5 and 6.2 million. The South Georgia population reached carrying capacity fairly recently and may thus be spilling over into relatively nearby, lower density sites. However, the abundance of adult females is estimated to have declined by some 30% between 2003 and 2012, and by 24% since 1984 to around 550,000. The population trend according to the IUCN Red list is 'decreasing' and it has been suggested that this decline is due to the effects of global climate change on prey availability. In April 2026, IUCN moved the Antarctic fur seal from Least Concern to Endangered on the IUCN Red list, alongside emperor penguin, as its population has decreased by more than 50% from an estimated 2,187,000 mature seals in 1999 to 944,000 in 2025. The ongoing decline is due to climate change, as rising ocean temperatures and shrinking sea-ice are pushing krill to greater ocean depths in search of colder water, reducing the availability of food for seals.

== Threats ==
Historically the species were decimated by the sealing industry for its fur and its population was driven close to extinction by the 19th century. Since sealing operations ceased in the early 20th century, the species has recovered at different rates across its former geographic range.

Waters inhabited by Antarctic fur seals are exploited by few fisheries, but these may expand in their range in the future. A 1997 study at South Georgia indicated that several thousand Antarctic fur seals were entangled in man-made debris such as discarded fishing line, nets, packing bands and anything that can form a collar. Consequently, CCAMLR campaigned for compliance with MARPOL provisions relating to waste disposal at sea, and for cutting of any material jettisoned which could form collars to entangle seals. Subsequent monitoring of entangled fur seals confirmed that entanglement is still a persistent problem, but it has halved in recent years. Trawling activities developing around Macquarie Island may affect the prey base of the primarily fish-eating Antarctic fur seals that breed on those islands. Recent work indicates that there is significant overlap between foraging areas and fisheries activities, suggesting a potential for competition for prey resources may exist.

Leopard seals have been noted to take as many as a third of the Antarctic Fur Seal pups born at sites in the South Shetland Islands. Levels of predation may be high enough to cause a population decline at these sites.

As well as the effects of hunting and fishing, the numbers of humans visiting the Antarctic and sub-Antarctic each year for tourism and scientific expeditions have risen. This increase in visits has led to greater interaction between the local fauna and humans. With this greater interaction comes the risk of affecting the territoriality of seals especially during the mating season. This can also increase the possibility of 'exotic' injuries to humans. In 2015 a man was rescued from a South Georgia Island by British Forces after receiving a serious bite from a fur seal. Due to the remote location of where these injuries occur, this can lead to complications in getting people to a physician with the relevant experience in treating exotic animal bites. This issue is compounded by the complexity of fur seal behaviour and how serious a bite can be and the risk of transfer of diseases. The implication for Antarctic Fur Seals but this species is considered to be one of several pinnipeds at high risk of future disease outbreaks because of their tendency to congregate in large dense aggregations and the effect of environmental changes associated with global warming on the spread of diseases.

Fur seals are considered to be vulnerable to H5N1 bird flu, and a closely-related Long-nosed fur seal was the first recorded death of an Australian mammal from the disease in August 2026.

Finally, the 19th century population bottleneck led to reduced genetic diversity, leaving it again more vulnerable to disease and stresses of climate change. In particular, the Antarctic fur seal's primary prey base, krill, could be reduced as a result of ocean acidification, or the distribution could be altered by climate change.

== Conservation status ==
The conservation status of this species was classified as Least Concern until 2026, when the IUCN reclassified its status as Endangered.

The species is protected by the governments in whose waters it resides (Australia, South Africa, France) and by the Convention for the Conservation of Antarctic Seals in waters south of 60° S. The animal is also listed in Appendix 2 of CITES.
