= Murphy Wall =

Murphy Wall (54°5′S 37°24′W) is a geological feature on the isle of South Georgia consisting of a series of north–south trending peaks, and said to resemble a wall. The highest peak is 905 meters.

The feature is situated along the west side of Grace Glacier in the northern region of the South Georgia.

The geological feature was surveyed by the South Georgia Survey in the period 1951–57, and named by the United Kingdom Antarctic Place-Names Committee (UK-APC) in reference to Robert Cushman Murphy, American ornithologist who made observations and collections in the Bay of Isles in 1912-13 for the American Museum of Natural History, New York City.
