= Edward Lyman Morris =

American botanist

- Born: October 23, 1870; Monson, Massachusetts
- Died: September 14, 1913 (aged 42); Brooklyn, New York
- Education: Amherst College
- Scientific career
- Fields: Botany
- Author abbrev. (botany): E.Morris

Edward Lyman Morris (1870–1913) was an American botanist.

== Biography ==
After secondary education at Monson Academy, Morris enrolled at Amherst College in 1888 and received there a bachelor's degree in 1891. He then spent one year (1891–1892) at the Museum of the Worcester Natural History Society and completed one year (1892–1893) of graduate study at Harvard University. After two years as an assistant in the biological laboratory at Amherst College, he received there an M.A. in 1895. From 1895 to 1896 he was an instructor at Amherst College. From 1896 to 1907 he worked for the public school system of Washington DC, and for the last seven years of his employment there he was the head of the department of biology. From 1907 until his death in 1913 he was the curator of natural science at the Museum of the Brooklyn Institute of Arts and Sciences.

In 1898 he collected for the United States National Herbarium on the Florida Keys, and in 1900 was an assistant upon the staff of the United States Fish Commission in West Virginia. For four years he was a special plant expert of the Department of Agriculture, doing field work in Oregon, along the Great Lakes, and in Iowa.

He was a member of several learned societies and the Cosmos Club. He was a founding member and active participant in the Washington Biologists' Field Club.

Morris married twice. His first wife died in 1903. He married again in 1907 and upon his death was survived by his widow and a son.

== Selected publications ==
- "Some plants of West Virginia". Proc. Biol. Soc. Washington. 13: 171–182. 31 October 1900.
- "Botanizing in and around a lake". Plant World. 4: 109–110. June 1901.
- Morris, E. L. (1901). "North American Plantaginaceae—II". Bulletin of the Torrey Botanical Club. 28 (2): 112–122. doi:10.2307/2477887. JSTOR 2477887.
- "Abnormal Trilliums". Plant World. 6: 87–89. April 1903.
- "The bush morning-glory". Plant World. 7: 109–113. May 1904.
- Morris, E. L. (1909). "North American Plantaginaceae—III". Bulletin of the Torrey Botanical Club. 36 (9): 515–530. doi:10.2307/2479291. JSTOR 2479291.
- "Germination of cat-tail seeds". Torreya. 11 (9): 181–184. September 1911.
- "The possibilities of botanical exhibits". Proceedings of the American Association of Museums. 6: 105–108. 1912.

== Honors ==
=== Eponyms ===
- Morris Glacier

=== Academic honors ===
- 1911 — elected a Fellow of the American Association for the Advancement of Science
