= Whalers Passage =

Channel in South Georgia

- Location: South Georgia
- Coordinates: 53°59′S 37°29′W
- Type: Channel
- Islands: Welcome Islands, Sky Rock

Location
- Interactive map of Whalers Passage

Whalers Passage (53°59′S 37°29′W) is a narrow channel lying between the Welcome Islands and Sky Rock, off the north coast of South Georgia. The name appears to be first used on a 1931 British Admiralty chart.
