= Crescent Island =

Island in the Bay of Isles, South Georgia

Crescent Island (54°1′S 37°19′W) is a small, roughly crescent-shaped island lying close south of Mollyhawk Island in the Bay of Isles, South Georgia. It was roughly charted in 1912–13 by Robert Cushman Murphy. It was surveyed and named in 1929–30 by Discovery Investigations personnel.

== See also ==
- Temoe (Gambier Islands)
- List of Antarctic and sub-Antarctic islands
