= Welcome Islands =

Archipelago in South Georgia

- Interactive map of Welcome Islands

Geography
- Coordinates: 53°58′S 37°29′W
- Archipelago: South Georgia
- Highest elevation: 88 m (289 ft)

Administration
- United Kingdom

Demographics
- Population: Uninhabited

The Welcome Islands (Spanish: Islas Bienvenido) are a small, rocky archipelago to the north of the main island of South Georgia. They are to the east of Bird Island.

They are 6.4 km (4 mi) west-northwest of Cape Buller, off the north coast of South Georgia. These islands were discovered by Captain James Cook in 1775. The name dates back to at least 1912 and is now well established.

The highest point in the islands is 88 m (289 ft)

== See also ==
- Composite Antarctic Gazetteer
- List of antarctic and sub-antarctic islands
- List of Antarctic islands north of 60° S
- Whalers Passage
