= Siuraq =

Island in Nunavut, Canada

Siuraq Island
- Location within Nunavut Location within Canada

Geography
- Location: Northern Canada
- Coordinates: 69°32′51″N 80°49′34″W
- Archipelago: Arctic Archipelago

Administration
- Canada
- Territory: Nunavut
- Region: Qikiqtaaluk

Demographics
- Population: Uninhabited

Siuraq (Inuktitut syllabics: ᓯᐅᕋᖅ) formerly Tern Island is an island located in Nunavut's Qikiqtaaluk Region in the northern Canadian Arctic. It is situated in the Foxe Basin. The mainland's Melville Peninsula is to the west, Baffin Island is to the northwest, and Kapuiviit is to the northeast. The closest Inuit community, Igloolik, is approximately 43.3 km (26.9 mi) to the west.
