= Cape Buller =

Headland on the north coast of South Georgia

Coordinates: 53°59′S 37°22′W

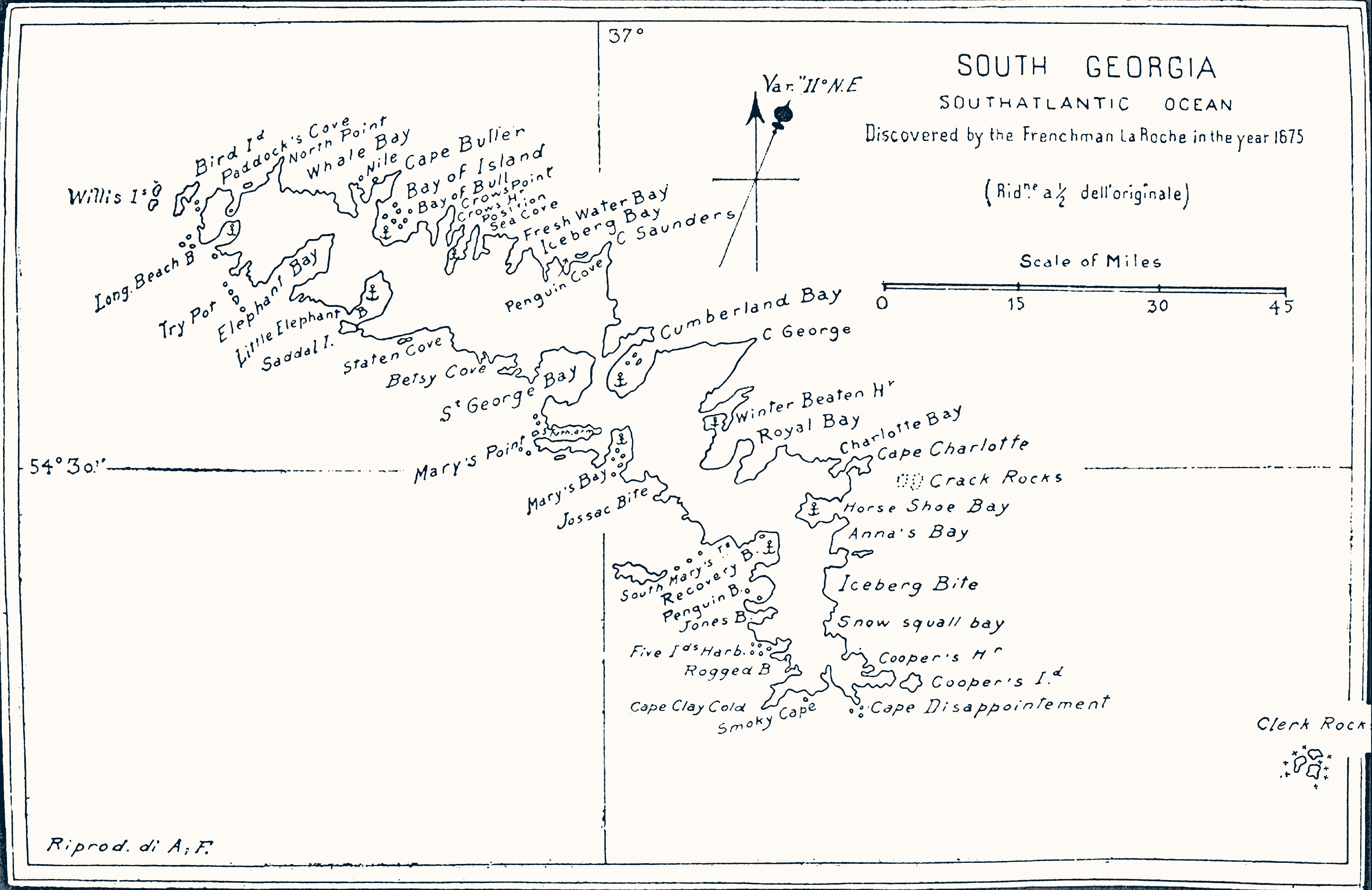
Pendleton's 1802 map showing Cape Buller

Cape Buller is a rugged headland forming the west side of the entrance to the Bay of Isles on the north coast of South Georgia. It was discovered and named in 1775 by a British expedition under James Cook.

Macdonald Cove sits just to the west of Cape Buller on the north coast of the island. The cove is 2.5 nautical miles (5 km) south-southeast of the Welcome Islands and has important fossil occurrences on its periphery. It was named by the UK Antarctic Place-Names Committee in 1982 after David I.M. Macdonald, a British Antarctic Survey geologist in charge of field work on South Georgia, 1975–76 and 1976–77.

Sitka Bay sits west of Macdonald Dove, 1 nautical mile (2 km) west of Cape Buller. The names Sitka Bay and Buller Bay have both appeared for this feature on maps for many years. Following a survey of South Georgia in 1951 and 1952, the South Georgia Survey reported that this feature is known locally as Sitka Bay, and the name is approved on that basis.
