= Albatross Island (South Georgia) =

Island in the Bay of Isles, South Georgia

- Interactive map of Albatross Island

Geography
- Location: South Atlantic Ocean
- Coordinates: 54°1′S 37°20′W
- Archipelago: South Georgia

Administration
- United Kingdom
- Essequibo Islands-West Demerara

Albatross Island is a small islet located 2 miles (3 km) southeast of Cape Buller in the Bay of Isles. It is part of South Georgia, a British Overseas Territory to the east of Falkland Islands. Charted in 1912–13 by American naturalist Robert Cushman Murphy aboard the brig Daisy, it was named for the observation of albatrosses on the island. The eastern headland of the island is called the Pricker. The island has been designated as a Specially Protected Area, and has been closed to visitors since 2004.

== Geography ==
Albatross Island is a small islet which forms part of South Georgia, a British Overseas Territory. It is located 2 miles (3 km) southeast of Cape Buller in the Bay of Isles, to the east of Falkland Islands. Charted in 1912–13 by American naturalist Robert Cushman Murphy aboard the brig Daisy, it was named the observation of albatrosses in the island. The eastern headland of the island is called the Pricker, a name which first appeared on a 1931 British Admiralty chart.

== Flora and fauna ==
The islet is small and rocky with coastal tussock vegetation suitable for seabird nesting. The bird population in South Georgia consists of 31 bird species including 25 seabirds, and three endemic subspecies. Wandering, black-browed, and grey-headed species of albatrosses breed here. However, studies in 2014-15 showed that albatross populations have declined by 18% over the previous decade and has been of international conservation concern. One of the causes for the declining populations have been attributed to illegal fishing outside the designated areas.

== Conservation ==
The island has been designated by the South Georgia Government as a Specially Protected Area, and has been closed to visitors since 2004, to protect vulnerable habitat from trampling. Eradication programs have been conducted to get rid of rats to enable breeding of seabirds. Covered by Agreement on the Conservation of Albatrosses and Petrels, three albatross species have been designated as "Priority Populations" for action plans targeting reducing bycatch during fishing and habitat protection. The island is uninhabited except for occasional research visits by South Georgia Heritage Trust and scientists for seabird monitoring. The British Antarctic Survey and South Georgia government funds and enforces mitigation techniques like bird control devices, line-setting protocols, and fisheries management.

== See also ==
- List of Antarctic and sub-Antarctic islands
