= Prion Island =

Island in the Bay of Isles, South Georgia

Coordinates: 54°1′S 37°15′W

Location of Prion Island in the Bay of Isles

Prion Island is an island 2.4 km (1.5 mi) north-northeast of Luck Point, lying in the Bay of Isles, South Georgia. It was charted in 1912–13 by Robert Cushman Murphy, American naturalist aboard the brig Daisy, and so named because he observed prions on the island. It has no permanent population due to lack of infrastructure.

The island has been designated as a Specially Protected Area by the South Georgia Government, due to its rat-free status and breeding wandering albatrosses. Access is by permit, in that the island must be specifically named on the visit application and permit. A boardwalk with two viewing platforms was built in February/March 2008 to prevent erosion of the access gully and trampling of prion burrows. Wandering Albatross population counts are conducted annually. Due to being rat-free, it is a breeding area for South Georgia pipits and burrowing petrels. Prion island has wildlife such as Giant Petrels, Gentoo penguins, and Southern elephant seals.

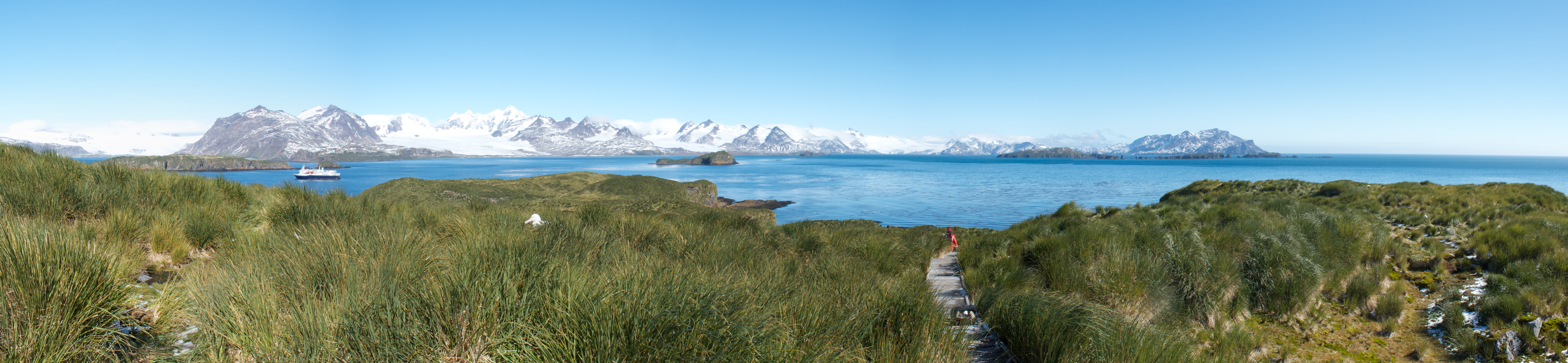
Prion Island panorama

== Access ==
Visits are restricted as described in the GSGSSI Information For Visitors document as follows:

- Closed between 20 November and 7 January (Inclusive), to prevent disturbance of breeding fur seals at the landing beach.
- A maximum of two visits per day
- Landing at the designated beach only and all visitors to stay on the boardwalk
- Commercial visits to maintain a 1:10 staff to passenger ratio
- Maximum 50 people ashore at any time
- A visit is not to exceed 5 hours
- Thorough biosecurity checks to be made before landing

== See also ==
- List of Antarctic and sub-Antarctic islands
- Google Street View website Retrieved Jan 2017
