= Bay of Isles =

Bay along the coast of South Georgia

Coordinates: 54°2′S 37°20′W

The Isles of the Bay of Isles

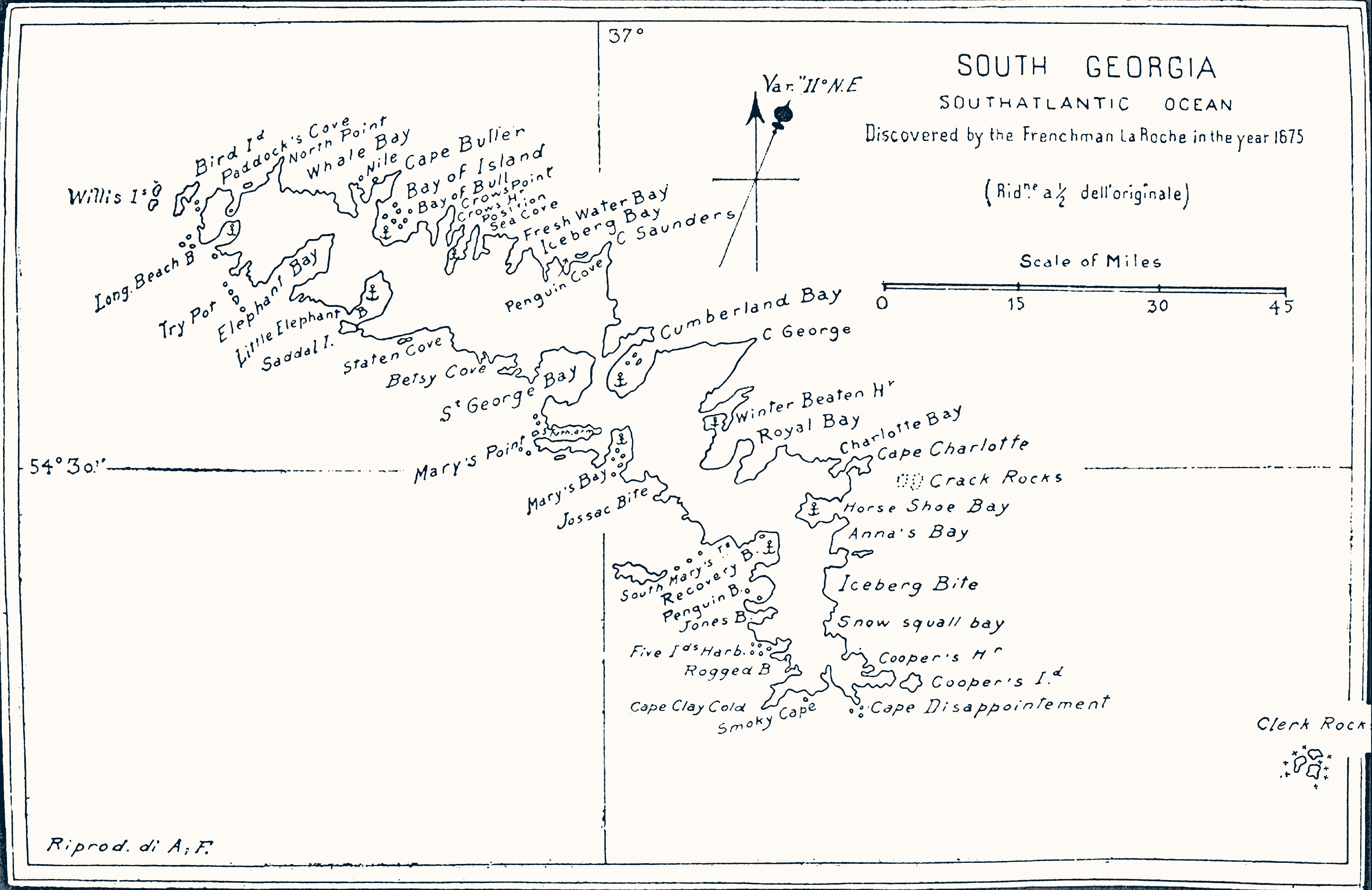
Pendleton's map lists it as the "Bay of Island"

The Bay of Isles is a bay 9 miles (14 km) wide and 3 miles (5 km) deep, lying between Cape Buller and Cape Wilson along the north coast of South Georgia. It was discovered in 1775 by a British expedition under James Cook and so named by him because numerous islands (at least 12) lie in the bay. Of South Georgia's 31 breeding bird species, 17 are found here.

== Named features ==
The features around the Bay of Isles have been charted and named by a number of Antarctic expeditions since 1775. The bay is wide, and has a complex coastline that includes many subsidiary bays, coves, inlets, and other features, many of which have named headlands and points between them.

The west coast of the Bay of Isles is roughly C-shaped. Its northernmost point is the rugged headland Cape Buller; Cleveland Rock sits nearby. Pyramid Peak rises over the cape. Just southeast of the cape sits Barlas Bank, a small submarine bank. At the top of the C-shape, Koppervik Cove indents the north coast of the west side of the bay, with Breakwater Point marking the cove's west edge.

Along the coast to the west are Sheathbill Bay, separated by a small cove from Rosita Harbour. Ram Head separates Rosita Harbour from Camp Bay to the south. In turn, Shag Point separates Camp Bay from Sunset Fjord, which forms the entirety of the southwest corner of the Bay of Isles. Just south of Shag Point within Sunset Fjord is Jock Point. Brunonia Glacier and Clayton Glacier both flow along Murphy Wall into Sunset Fjord.

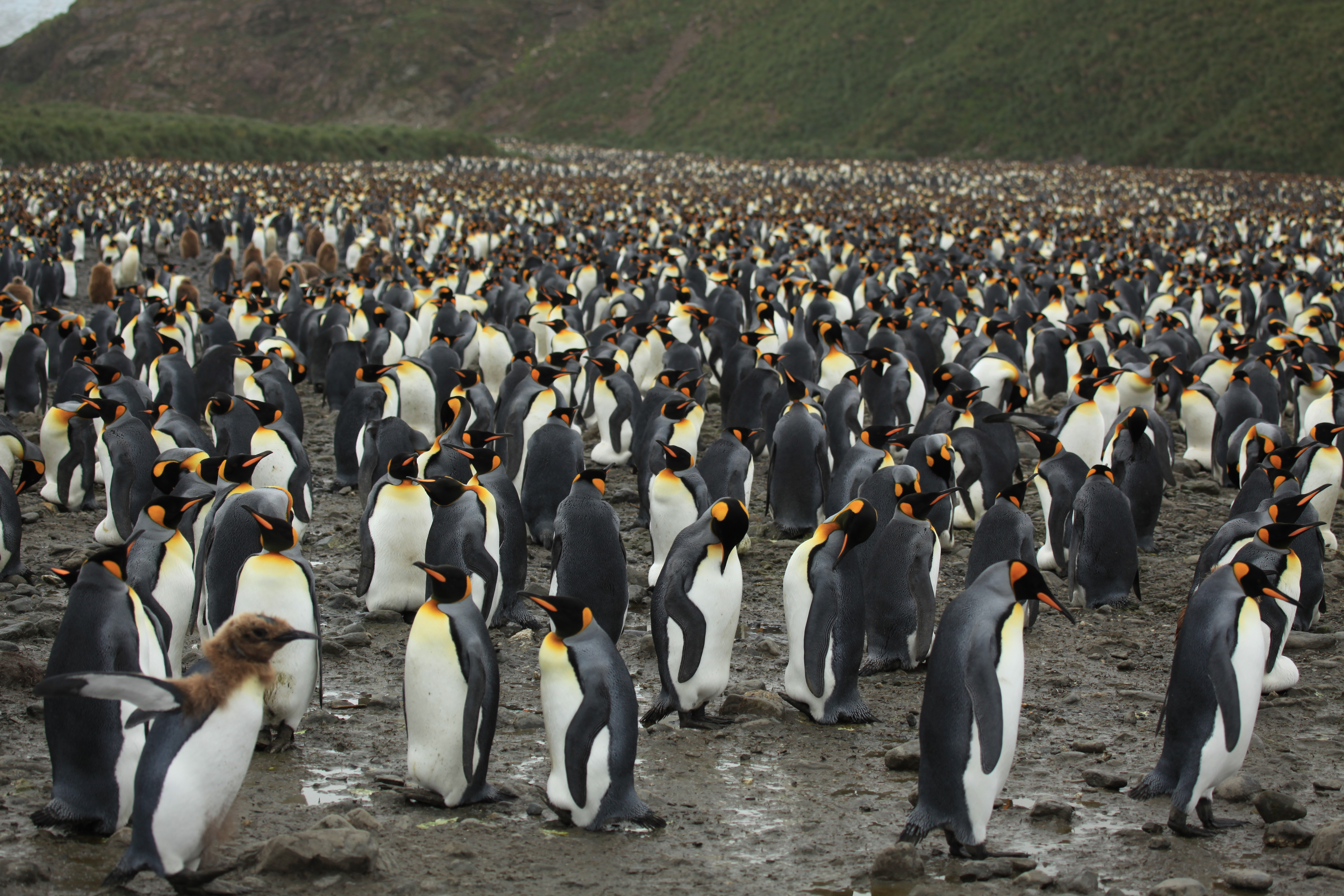
A colony of up to 60,000 King penguins (Aptenodytes patagonicus) on Salisbury Plain at Ample Bay.

Markham Point forms the west side of Ample Bay, which sits 2 nautical miles (4 km) east of Sunset Fjord, along the south coast of the Bay of Isles. Just inside Markham Point is Paul Beach, a shingle beach 0.55 nmi (1 km) long. It is tussock-covered at the higher levels, and backed by 35 m (115 ft) cliffs which extend eastward from Markham Point. East of the beach, Grace Glacier flows into Ample Bay, marking the west side of Salisbury Plain; Lucas Glacier marks the plain's east side.

Continuing east along the south coast of the bay, Luck Point forms the west side of the entrance to Sea Leapord Fjord, a large fjord 1.15 nmi (2.13 km) wide, bordered on the east side by Bellingshausen Point. Immediately east is Beckmann Fjord, whose easternmost side is marked by Daisy Point. Just off the entrance to Beckmann Fjord is Hecate Rock, a submerged rock with a least depth of 4.2 metres (14 ft). Austin Glacier flows northbound into Beckmann Fjord. Finally, the farthest east side of the Bay of Isles is marked by Cape Wilson.

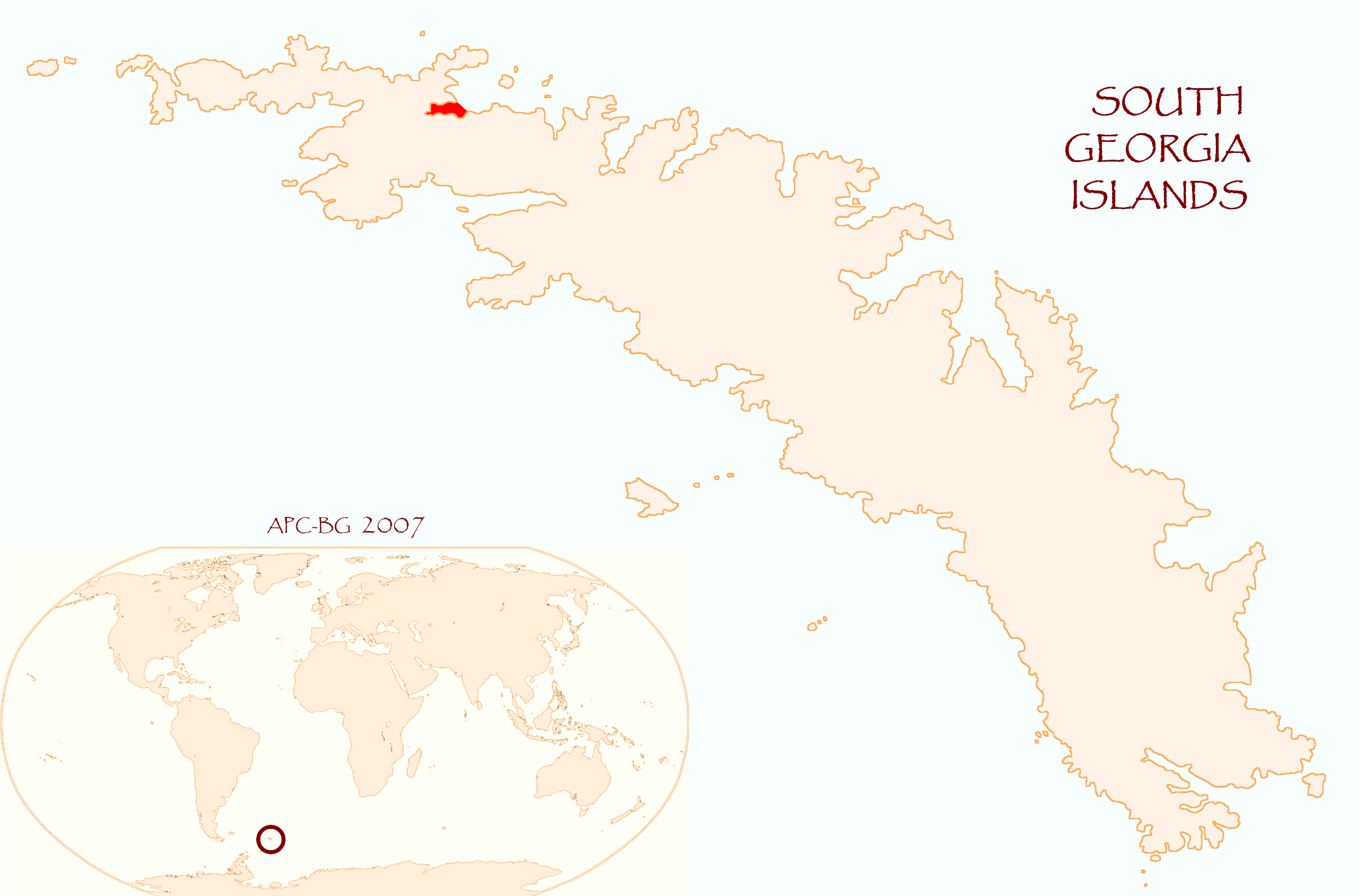
Sunset Fjord

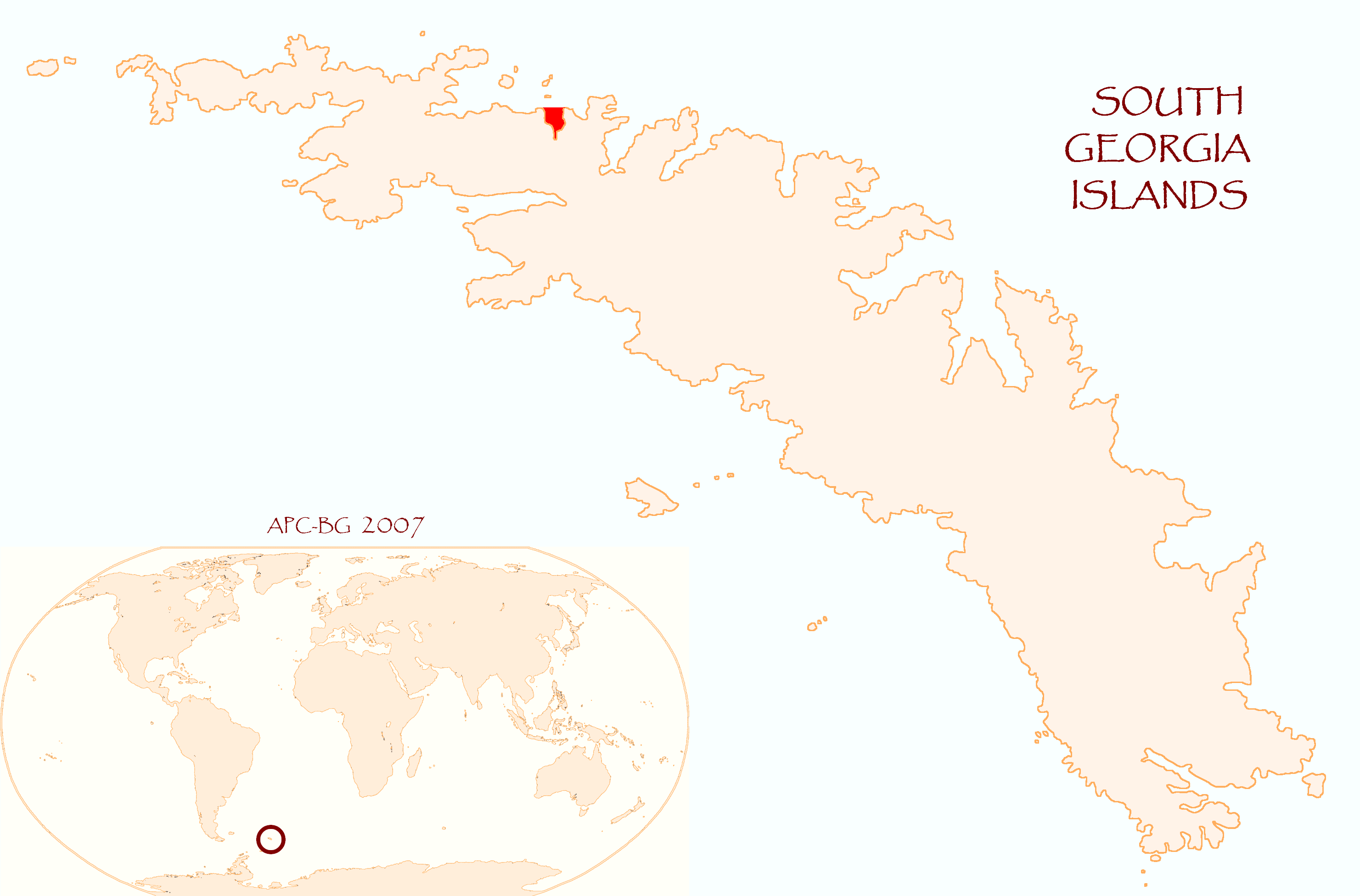
Sea Leapord Fjord

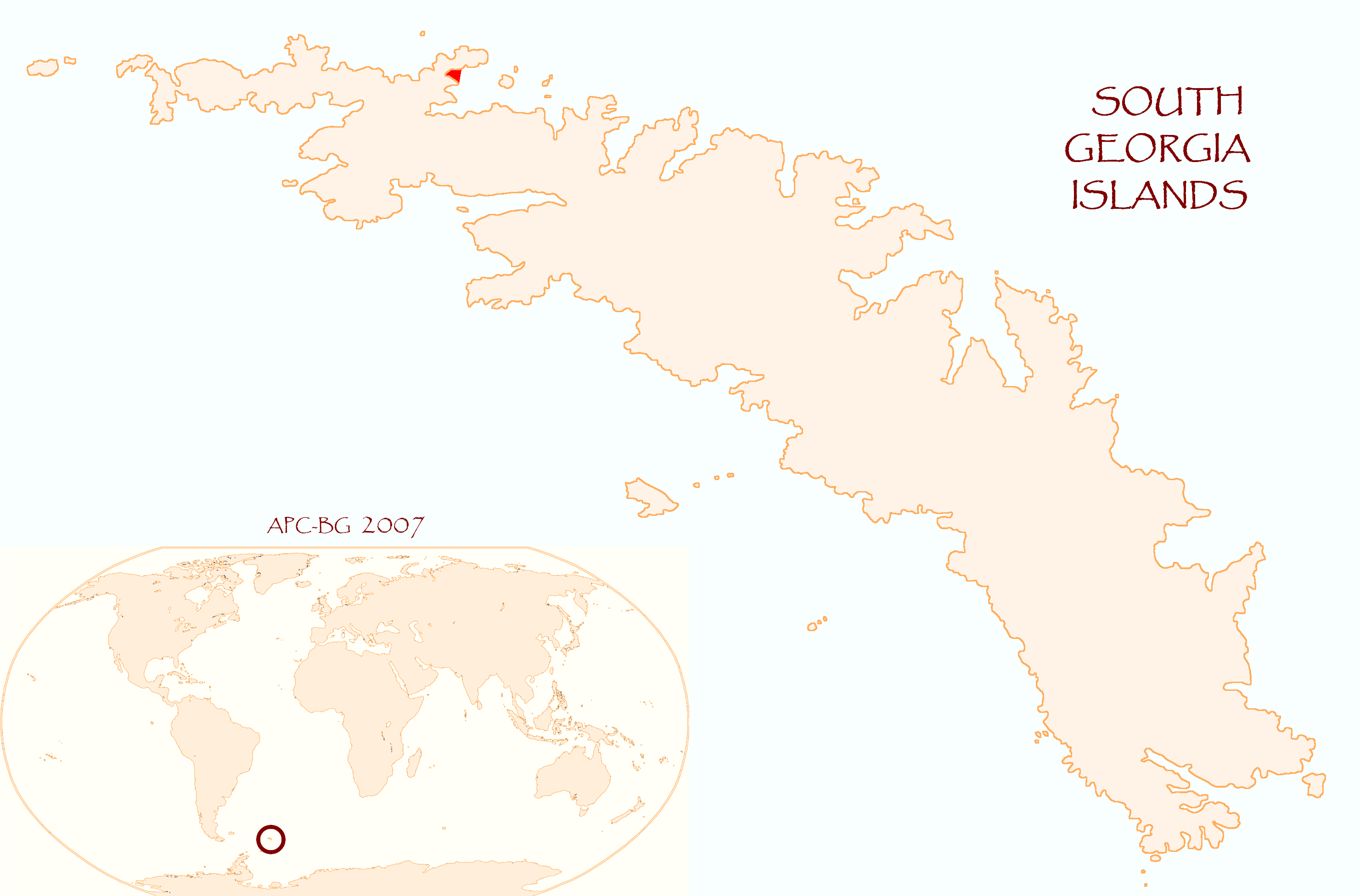
Rosita Harbour

=== Islands ===
The Bay of Isles is named for its numerous islands, many of which are named after local birds:

- Albatross Island (albatross)
- Crescent Island
- Invisible Island
- Mollyhawk Island (mollyhawk)
- Skua Island (skua)
- Petrel Island (petrel)
- Prion Island (prion)
- Tern Island (tern)

== Charting and naming of features ==
Cape Buller was discovered and named in 1775 by a British expedition under James Cook. Markham Point was named on a 1912 chart by J. Innes Wilson.

Beckmann Fjord, Bellingshausen Point, Brunonia Glacier, Cape Wilson, Grace Glacier, Lucas Glacier, Sea Leopard Fjord, and Sunset Fjord were charted in 1912-13 by Robert Cushman Murphy, who visited South Georgia in the brig Daisy. Beckmann Fjord was named for Captain Beckmann, master gunner of the whaler Don Ernesto, who lost his life in a whaling accident in December 1912. Bellingshausen Point was named for Admiral Thaddeus Bellingshausen. Murphy named Brunonia Glacier for his alma mater, Brown University, using a Latinized version of the name. Cape Wilson was named for American President Woodrow Wilson. Grace Glacier was named for Murphy's wife, Grace Barstow Murphy. He named Lucas Glacier for Frederic Augustus Lucas, then-director of the American Museum of Natural History. Sunset Fjord was named because he could see the sunset directly behind the fjord from his anchorage in the Bay of Isles.

Ample Bay, Barlas Bank, Camp Bay, Jock Point, and Luck Point were charted and named by Discovery Investigations (DI) personnel between 1928 and 1930. Ample Bay was first sketched but not named by Murphy. Barlas Bank was named after William Barlas, the British representative at Deception Island and the South Shetland Islands. Camp Bay was named for a temporary camp set up on its southern shore. Jock Point wa named after Petty Officer J. "Jock" Purvis, a member of the DI hydrographic survey team.

The name Koppervik was in use prior to 1930, probably by Norwegian whalers operating at South Georgia. The names Austin Glacier, Breakwater Point, Ram Head, and Shag Point first appear on a 1931 British Admiralty chart.

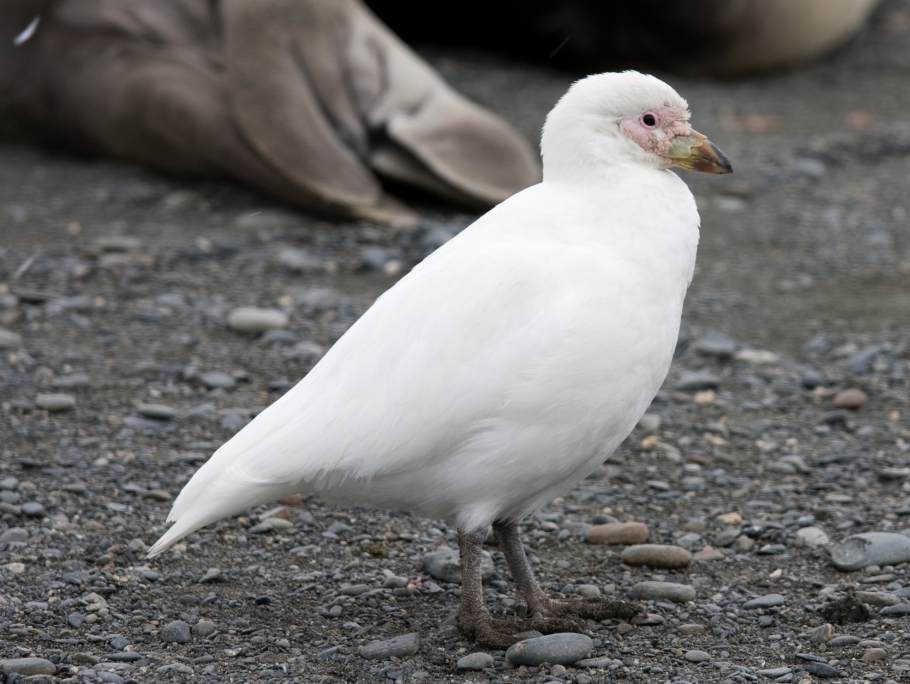
Snowy sheathbill, namesake bird of Sheathbill Bay.

The South Georgia Survey (SGS) of 1951-1957 has been responsible for selecting several names in and around the Bay of Isles. The SGS named Rosita Harbour after the company's whaling ship Rosita, which anchored in this bay, rejecting the alternate name Allardyce Harbour. In 1952, the SGS approved the name Daisy Point over Low Point, for the Daisy.

Two members of the Falkland Islands Dependencies Survey (FIDS) occupied Paul Beach for research from 1953 to 1954, and named the beach for the FIDS buoy-boat Southern Paul.

Cleveland Rock was charted by the SGS, and named by the UK Antarctic Place-Names Committee (UK-APC) in the 1980s for Benjamin D. Cleveland, captain of the Daisy. Clayton Glacier was named by UK-APC for geologist Roger A.S. Clayton of the British Antarctic Survey. Sheathbill Bay was named by UK-APC for the snowy sheathbills that live in the bay. Hecate Rock was named by UK-APC in 1984 after HMS Hecate (A137), which came very close to grounding on the rock during a hydrographic survey of the Bay of Isles in January–February, 1983.
