= Robert Cushman Murphy =

American ornithologist and museum curator

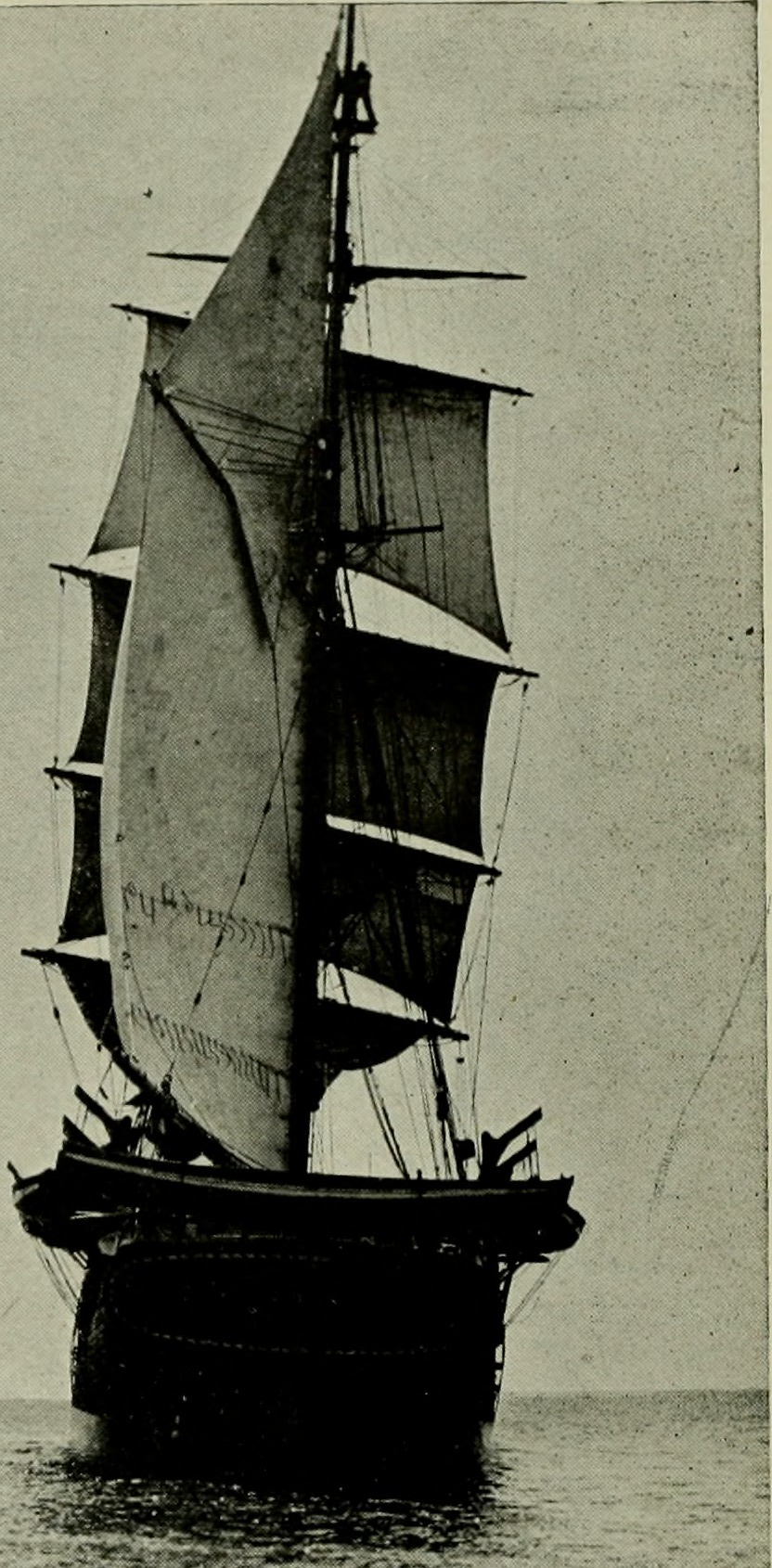
The whaling ship, Daisy, which Murphy traveled on to the Antarctic

Robert Cushman Murphy (April 29, 1887 – March 20, 1973) was an American ornithologist and Lamont Curator of birds at the American Museum of Natural History. He went on numerous oceanic expeditions and was an expert on marine birds, and wrote several major books on them. He described a species of petrel which is now known as Murphy's petrel. Mount Murphy in Antarctica and Murphy Wall in South Georgia are named after him.

== Life and work ==
Murphy was born in Brooklyn, New York, to Thomas D. Murphy and Augusta Cushman. Around 1906 Murphy assisted Frank Chapman at the American Museum of Natural History and read the proofs of Warblers of North America. He was an undergraduate at Brown University, where he graduated in 1911. He married Grace Emeline Barstow in 1911 whom he met as a student at Brown University. Grace persuaded Robert to take a position as naturalist aboard the whaling ship Daisy. After their wedding was advanced, the couple sailed to the Caribbean and then he set out to sea for more than a year. It was during this period that he wrote the notes that went into his 1947 book Logbook for Grace: Whaling Brig Daisy, 1912-1913 which gives an insight into life aboard the last of the whaling ships. He took a special interest in marine birds. He lived for a period in Brooklyn where the couple had three children. They moved to Westchester County in 1921. He explored the marine birds on islands off Peru and wrote about them in Bird Islands of Peru (1925). He took part in the Brewster-Sanford Expedition under Rollo H. Beck. In 1936 he wrote the two volume Oceanic Birds of South America which is considered a classic. He also helped plan the Whitney South Sea Expedition. In 1969 the family moved to Stony Brook. In 1951, Murphy led the expedition that rediscovered the Bermuda petrel, or cahow, a bird believed to have been extinct for 330 years. He wrote over 600 scientific articles apart from his books.

In 1936 Murphy was awarded the Daniel Giraud Elliot Medal of the National Academy of Sciences and in 1937, the Brewster medal of the AOU. Brown University conferred an honorary Sc.D. in 1941. He was elected a Corresponding Member of the Royal Australasian Ornithologists' Union in 1939 and the American Philosophical Society in 1946. He also received awards from the Explorers Club, the John Burroughs Association and the Geographic Society. He served as president of the American Ornithologists' Union from 1948 to 1950.

After Murphy's retirement to Old Field, New York, in 1957, he, along with other citizens of Long Island including Archibald Roosevelt, unsuccessfully sued to stop the spraying of DDT. Before he died, the Three Village Central School District named the Robert Cushman Murphy Junior High School in his honor. Murphy accompanied Arthur Vernay to the island of Inagua in 1956 to look at the flamingo colony there during which they were joined by Ian Fleming upon whom he would make an impression.

Murphy was an avid diarist, even maintaining duplicates of every check he wrote so as to help any future research. Nylon socks had just been introduced and he had even maintained notes on the number of times he had worn a pair. Most of his personal papers are archived at the American Philosophical Society in Philadelphia. Some of his personal papers are located at the State University of New York at Stony Brook.

Trachurus murphyi, the Chilean jack mackerel, is named in honor of Murphy who collected the type off Peru.
